= Jack Findlay =

Australian motorcycle racer

- Findlay in the 1970s working on a watercooled twin
- Nationality: Australian
Motorcycle racing career statistics
Grand Prix motorcycle racing
Active years	1958 - 1978
First race	1958 500cc German Grand Prix
Last race	1978 500cc West German Grand Prix
First win	1971 500cc Ulster Grand Prix
Last win	1977 500cc Austrian Grand Prix
Team	Suzuki
Championships	1975 - Formula 750
Starts / Wins / Podiums / Poles / F. laps / Points; 163 / 3 / 25 / 1 / 1 / 350

Cyril John Findlay (5 February 1935 – 19 May 2007) was an Australian professional Grand Prix motorcycle road racer. He is noted for having one of the longest racing careers in Grand Prix history spanning 20 years, as well as one of six riders (along with Ángel Nieto, Alex Barros, Loris Capirossi, Valentino Rossi and Aleix Espargaró) to race in Grand Prix motorcycle racing for 20 years or more. He competed at the highest level despite racing as a privateer - that is, not as a contracted member of a factory team - throughout most of his racing career.

== Motorcycle racing career ==
Findlay was born in Mooroopna, Victoria, 180 kilometres (110 mi) north of Melbourne. He began racing aged 15, two years under age, taking the name "Jack" so he could use the identification documents of his father, John 'Jock' Findlay, a Scottish immigrant to Australia. After leaving school, he worked as a trainee accountant at Commonwealth Bank until 1957.

Findlay moved to England in 1958 to race, got a job at the BSA factory in Birmingham, and joined the Grand Prix circuit with a 350cc Norton Manx. He competed in his first Isle of Man TT in 1959. He competed on the Grand Prix circuit from 1958 to 1978.

Findlay's best championship result was in 1968 when he rode a Matchless to finish second behind Giacomo Agostini in the 500cc class. In 1971 he won his first race for Suzuki at the Ulster Grand Prix. As well as marking Suzuki's first 500cc class victory, the victory was notable for being the first 500cc class win for a motorcycle powered by a two stroke engine. His greatest victory came in 1973 when he won the Isle of Man Senior TT after 15 years of trying.

Findlay competed in the inaugural Formula 750 European championship in 1973, winning the Swedish round at the Anderstorp Raceway along with a third place in Finland and a second place in Great Britain to finish the season ranked third in the championship behind Barry Sheene and John Dodds. He rode Suzuki TR500s in 1973 and 1974.

In 1974, Findlay was a member of the Suzuki factory racing team and helped develop the Suzuki RG 500, with Barry Sheene and Paul Smart. He once again finished in third place in the 1974 Formula 750 season, this time behind Dodds and Patrick Pons. In 1975, he defeated Sheene for the 1975 Formula 750 championship. An accident that fractured his skull curtailed his racing career, and he retired in 1978. A further high-speed accident in 1987 stopped him riding motorcycles.

Findlay married Dominique Monneret, the widow of Georges Monneret, and made his domestic base in France and has a son, Gregory Findlay. He was appointed Grand Prix technical director by the Fédération Internationale de Motocyclisme in 1992, retaining the post until he retired in 2001. He was assisted by his fluency in French and Italian. The French film director Jérôme Laperrousaz made a documentary movie about road racing called Continental Circus in 1972. It starred Findlay and Giacomo Agostini and featured a soundtrack by the psychedelic rock band Gong, including a song called "Blues for Findlay". The film poster's headline was "Jimi Hendrix avait sa guitare. Jack Findlay avait sa moto." ("Jimi Hendrix had his guitar. Jack Findlay had his bike.") A bronze statue of Findlay on a TT-winning Suzuki by Philip Mune was unveiled in July 2006, in a park in Mooroopna that was renamed the Jack Findlay Reserve.

== Motorcycle Grand Prix results ==
Points system from 1950 to 1968:

Position	1	2	3	4	5	6
Points	8	6	4	3	2	1

Points system from 1969 onwards:

Position	1	2	3	4	5	6	7	8	9	10
Points	15	12	10	8	6	5	4	3	2	1

(key) (Races in italics indicate fastest lap)

Year	Class	Team	1	2	3	4	5	6	7	8	9	10	11	12	13	Points	Rank	Wins
1958	500cc	Norton	IOM -	NED -	BEL -	GER; 12	SWE -	ULS -	NAT -							0	-	0
1959	350cc	Norton	FRA -	IOM; NC	GER -			SWE -	ULS -	NAT -						0	-	0
1959	500cc	Norton	FRA -	IOM; NC	GER -	NED -	BEL -		ULS -	NAT -						0	-	0
1960	500cc	Norton	FRA -	IOM -	NED; 11	BEL -	GER; 12	ULS; 13	NAT; 8							0	-	0
1961	500cc	Norton	GER -	FRA -	IOM; DNS	NED; DNS	BEL; 8	DDR; 5	ULS; 8	NAT; 6	SWE; NC	ARG -				3	20th	0
1962	350cc	Norton	IOM; NC	NED -		ULS -	DDR -	NAT -	FIN -							0	-	0
1962	500cc	Norton	IOM; NC	NED; 12	BEL; 5	ULS; NC	DDR; NC	NAT -	FIN -	ARG -						2	21st	0
1963	250cc	Mondial	ESP -	GER -	IOM; NC	NED -	BEL -	ULS; 5	DDR -		NAT -	ARG -	JPN -			2	18th	0
1963	500cc	Norton			IOM; NC	NED -	BEL; 9	ULS; NC	DDR; 5	FIN -	NAT; 2	ARG -				8	8th	0
1964	350cc	AJS				IOM; NC	NED -		GER -	DDR -	ULS -	FIN -	NAT -	JPN -		0	-	0
1964	500cc	Matchless	USA; NC	IOM; 13	NED -	BEL; 5	GER; 8	DDR -	ULS -	FIN; 9	NAT; 5					4	14th	0
1965	125cc	Yamaha	USA -	GER -	ESP; 8	FRA -	IOM -	NED -		DDR -	CZE -	ULS -	FIN -	NAT -	JPN -	0	-	0
1965	250cc	DMW	USA -	GER -	ESP -	FRA -	IOM; 10	NED -	BEL -	DDR -	CZE -	ULS -	FIN -	NAT -	JPN -	0	-	0
1965	350cc	AJS		GER -			IOM; NC	NED -		DDR -	CZE -	ULS -	FIN -	NAT -	JPN -	0	-	0
1965	500cc	Matchless	USA -	GER; 4			IOM; 10	NED; 11	BEL; 12	DDR; 11	CZE; 9	ULS; 4	FIN; 5	NAT; 8		8	7th	0
1966	50cc	Bridgestone	ESP -	GER -		NED -						IOM; NC	NAT -	JPN; 6		1	13th	0
1966	125cc	Bultaco	ESP -	GER -		NED -		DDR -	CZE -	FIN -	ULS -	IOM; NC	NAT -	JPN -		0	-	0
1966	250cc	Bultaco	ESP; 4	GER -	FRA -	NED -	BEL -	DDR -	CZE -	FIN; 4	ULS -	IOM; 5	NAT; 4	JPN; 4		14	7th	0
1966	500cc	Matchless		GER -		NED; 6	BEL; NC	DDR; 2	CZE; 4	FIN; 3	ULS; 4	IOM; 8	NAT; 3			20	3rd	0
1967	250cc	Bultaco	ESP -	GER; 4	FRA -	IOM -	NED -	BEL -	DDR -	CZE -	FIN -	ULS -	NAT -	CAN -	JPN -	3	14th	0
1967	500cc	Matchless		GER; 3		IOM; DNS	NED -	BEL; 4	DDR; 3	CZE; DNS	FIN -	ULS; 3	NAT; 9	CAN -		15	5th	0
1968	250cc	Bultaco	GER; 5	ESP -	IOM; NC	NED -	BEL -	DDR; 6	CZE -	FIN -	ULS -	NAT; 5				5	9th	0
1968	350cc	Aermacchi	GER -		IOM; 6	NED -		DDR -	CZE -		ULS -	NAT -				1	18th	0
1968	500cc	Matchless	GER; NC	ESP; 2	IOM; NC	NED; 2	BEL; 2	DDR; 3	CZE; 2	FIN; 2	ULS; 5	NAT; NC				34	2nd	0
1969	250cc	Yamaha	ESP -	GER -	FRA -	IOM; NC	NED -	BEL; 7	DDR -	CZE -	FIN -	ULS -	NAT -	YUG -		4	33rd	0
1969	350cc	Yamaha	ESP; 5	GER; 4		IOM; 3	NED; 5		DDR -	CZE -	FIN; 7	ULS -	NAT -	YUG -		34	6th	0
1969	500cc	Linto	ESP; NC	GER; 3	FRA; NC	IOM; NC										16	13th	0
1969	500cc	Aermacchi					NED; 5	BEL; NC	DDR; NC	CZE; DNS	FIN; NC	ULS; NC	NAT; DNF	YUG -		16	13th	0
1970	250cc	Yamaha	GER -	FRA -	YUG -	IOM; 14	NED -	BEL -	DDR -	CZE -	FIN -	ULS -	NAT -	ESP -		0	-	0
1970	350cc	Yamaha	GER -		YUG -	IOM; NC	NED -		DDR; 6	CZE; 7	FIN -	ULS -	NAT -	ESP -		9	20th	0
1970	500cc	Seeley	GER -	FRA; NC	YUG; 4	IOM; 4	NED; NC	BEL; NC	DDR; 12		FIN -	ULS; 4	NAT -	ESP -		24	8th	0
1971	250cc	Yamaha	AUT -	GER -	IOM; 13	NED -	BEL -	DDR -	CZE -	SWE -	FIN -	ULS -	NAT -	ESP -		0	-	0
1971	350cc	Yamaha	AUT -	GER -	IOM; NC	NED -		DDR -	TCH -	SWE -	FIN -	ULS -	NAT -	ESP; 6		5	32nd	0
1971	500cc	Suzuki	AUT; 4	GER; NC	IOM -	NED; NC	BEL; 3	DDR -		SWE; 10	FIN; 5	ULS; 1	NAT; 5	ESP; 6		50	5th	1
1972	350cc	Yamaha	GER -	FRA -	AUT -	NAT -	IOM; 4	YUG -	NED; 7		DDR -	CZE -	SWE; 6	FIN -	ESP -	41	9th	0
1972	500cc	Jada	GER; 7	FRA -	AUT -	NAT; NC	IOM; NC	YUG -	NED; 6	BEL; NC	DDR; 5	CZE; 2	SWE; NC	FIN -	ESP; 3	31	8th	0
1973	500cc	Suzuki	FRA; 10	AUT -	GER -	IOM; 1	YUG -	NED; 5	BEL; 3	CZE; 5	SWE -	FIN; NC	ESP -			38	5th	1
1974	500cc	Suzuki	FRA; 12	GER; NC	AUT; 4	NAT; 4	IOM; NC	NED; NC	BEL; 5	SWE; NC	FIN; 4	CZE; 7				34	5th	0
1975	500cc	Yamaha	FRA -	AUT; NC	GER; 10	NAT; NC	IOM -	NED; NC	BEL; 3	SWE; 9	FIN; 3	CZE -				23	10th	0
1976	350cc	Yamaha	FRA -	AUT -	NAT -	YUG -	IOM; 8	NED -			FIN -	CZE -	GER -	ESP -		3	32nd	0
1976	500cc	Suzuki	FRA -	AUT; 8	NAT; NC		IOM; NC	NED; 5	BEL; NC	SWE; 2	FIN; 7	CZE -	GER -			25	8th	0
1977	500cc	Suzuki	VEN -	AUT; 1	GER; 13	NAT; NC	FRA; NC	NED -	BEL; 9	SWE; 14	FIN; NC	CZE; NC	GBR; NC			17	16th	1
1978	500cc	Suzuki	VEN -	ESP -	AUT -	FRA -	NAT -	NED; NC	BEL; 15	SWE -	FIN -	GBR; NC	GER; 18			0	-	0
