= Bo Granath =

Swedish motorcycle racer (born 1939)

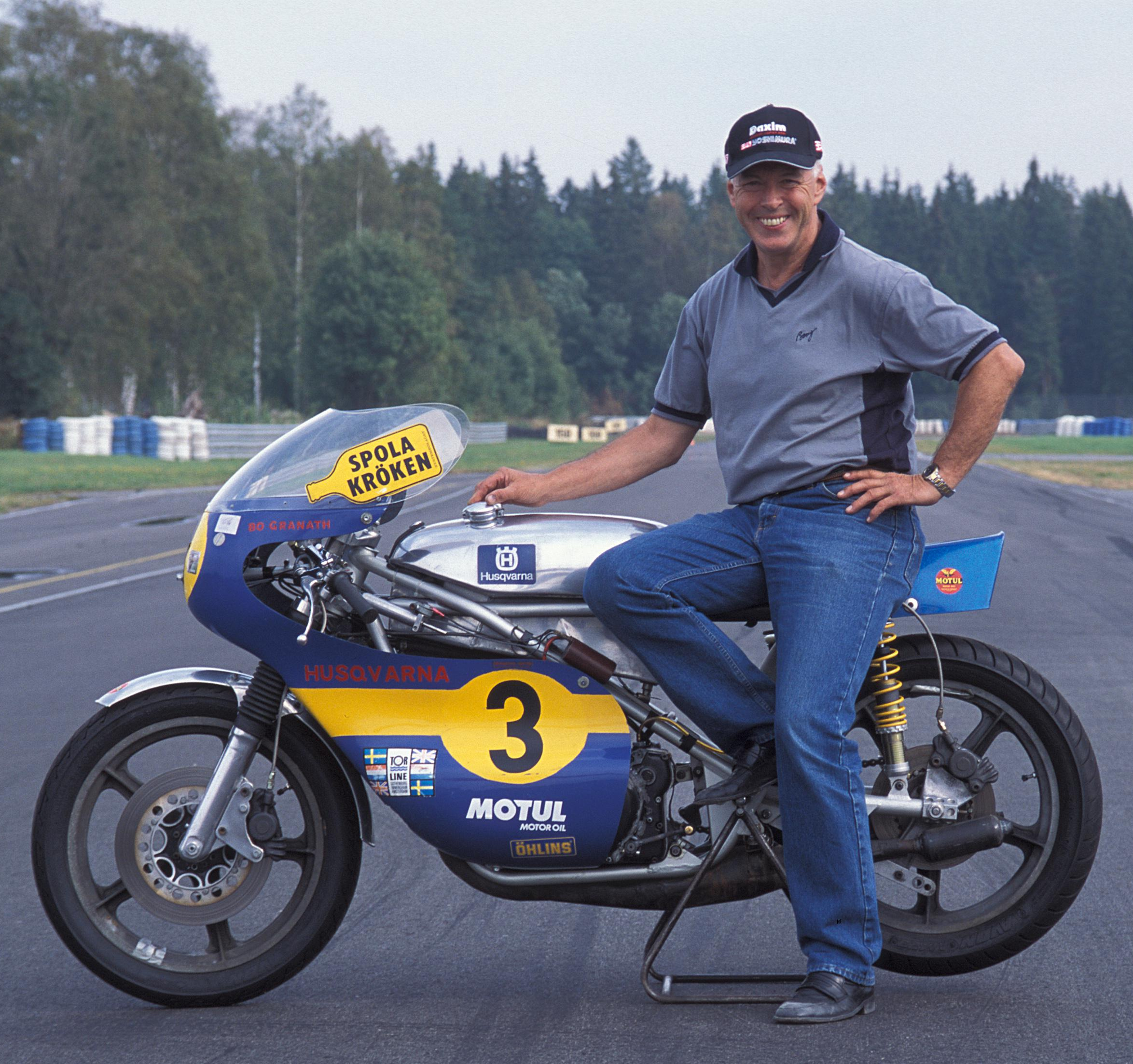
- Nationality: (Sweden) Swedish
- Born: November 21, 1939 (age 86); Stockholm, Sweden
Motorcycle racing career statistics
Grand Prix motorcycle racing
Active years	1967–1976
First race	1967 500cc Swedish Grand Prix
Last race	1976 500cc German Grand Prix
Team	Husqvarna
Championships	0
Starts / Wins / Podiums / Poles / F. laps / Points; 41 / 0 / 2 / 0 / 0 / 178

Bosse "Bo" Granath (Stockholm, 21 November 1939) is a Swedish former Grand Prix motorcycle road racer. His most successful competitive year was 1972, when he finished fifth in the 500cc world championship riding a Husqvarna motorcycle.

== Biography and career ==
Granath drove his first national race in 1960. In the winter, while doing military service, he bought a 500cc Norton Manx for the 1961 season. He had a junior license, but because there were so few junior drivers the seniors ride along. In Karlskoga he immediately became fourth behind three senior drivers, but with a lap behind. He also bought a 350cc Norton 40M for the second Swedish champion race. In Falkenberg, he finished fourth in both classes. In the Swedish championship, he was fifth in both classes. He applied for an international license to be allowed to start in the Grand Prix of Sweden.

1962 was a school year for Granath, with a lot of bad luck and poor results, but thanks to his international license he was able to start in many foreign races. He rode a number of international races in Belgium and the Netherlands, the Ulster Grand Prix and the East German Grand Prix, but his best result was 13th place on the Sachsenring.

In 1963, Granath bought a 350cc AJS 7R and a 500cc Matchless G50. These machines were found to be fast and reliable. He went to Britain to race at the Silverstone, Snetterton and Oulton Park circuits and was impressed by the speeds in the British races. In Oulton Park, some riders drove him on three laps, but he learned a lot and in August he went to Oulton again. In the meantime, he had also driven the Isle of Man TT for the first time. He experienced a perilous moment when a gas line broke at the Highlander. The gasoline came on the open primary chain, and the front of the AJS caught fire. Granath looked at a wall of fire but did not dare to jump off his engine at about 180 km/hour. He slid over the back of his saddle, set his feet on the road, and steered the machine by holding the saddle until he dared to drop. The AJS crashed into a wall at Glen Helen. Granath sustained severe burns on an arm and foot and took considerable time to recuperate.

In 1964, Granath won his first race, the 500cc race in Falkenberg, but he crashed hard in Oulton Park and got fear of still racing. As a result, he performed poorly throughout the season and his anxiety persisted until mid-1965. Only after the 1965 Isle of Man TT did his fears disappear, strangely enough, because he had learned to ride on two wheels at the TT. He now had an MZ RE 125 in addition to the AJS and the Matchless. In 1965, he managed to win his first Swedish championship titles: in the 125cc and 500cc classes. In 1966, he again became Swedish 125cc champion.

In 1967, Granath had a very good season. He became Swedish champion in three classes and scored his first World Championship points at the 500cc Finnish Grand Prix where he finished fourth in the pouring rain. He was almost third but got problems with his clutch so he had to let Billie Nelson pass. Two days before this race, Granath's first son Peter was born. Earlier in the season, he had finished seventh in the - also wet - Belgian Grand Prix, but in that time only the first six finishers received points. In this season, he also started riding Husqvarna's for the first time: in the 250cc class and the 350cc class came out with single-cylinders from the Swedish brand. The frames were built by Bertil Persson. He won almost all Swedish races with the 350cc machine.

In 1968, Granath asked the Husqvarna engineer Ruben Helmin to build a 500cc two-cylinder. This machine was ready by the end of the season and Granath won the last two Swedish races. He became Swedish champion in the 350cc class.

In 1969, Granath rode a fairly full Grand Prix season. For the 125cc race in the French Grand Prix, he even got a Yamaha YZ 623 prototype from Yamaha, with which he managed to take the lead in the race until he failed with a broken crankshaft. His air-cooled Husqvarna 500 two-cylinder engine was still very unreliable, and he only scored four World Championship points this year thanks to his seventh place in the 125cc Belgian Grand Prix.

For the 1970 season, Granath purchased two Yamahas for the 250 and 350cc classes. In his first 250cc race in France, he immediately became sixth, but also second Yamaha driver behind factory rider Rod Gould. He finished the season ranked ninth in the 250cc class. The Husqvarna was still not reliable, but it did bring him the Swedish title in the 500cc class.

The opening race of the 1971 season, the Austrian Grand Prix, went very well, with a fifth place in the 350cc class and a sixth place in the 250cc class. Granath finished seventh in the 350cc class. Also in the 500cc class, it went better now that the Husqvarna remained intact a little more often: he finished 15th. It was the season in which the 500cc two-stroke engines became stronger, but it was the Kawasaki H1R and Suzuki TR500 that set the tone. Giacomo Agostini was still supreme with his MV Agusta 500 Three. Granath scored the first World Championship points for Husqvarna in the 500cc class during the Dutch TT, in which he finished eighth behind.

A new 500cc engine appeared in 1972: riders discovered that a Yamaha TR3 was a good weapon to beat the 500cc machines due to its maneuverability and light weight. After the two MV Agustas of Agostini and Alberto Pagani, Bruno Kneubühler and Rodney Gould took third and fourth place in the championship with these machines. However, the Granath's Husqvarna was now very reliable. He even had to cross away from a few results and finished fifth in the world championship. In the Austrian and Swedish Grand Prix races, he achieved the only podium results of his career.

With the arrival of the factory Yamaha TZ500 and the König by Kim Newcombe, it was difficult in 1973 to score points in the 500cc class. Granath also often dropped out and scored only 12 points.

In 1974, the Husqvarna was definitely no longer fast enough to score points. Granath only dropped out once but remained scoreless. From that moment he started driving fewer and fewer Grand Prix races. Remarkably, he started in three classes in the 1975 Isle of Man TT, a race that in the meantime was boycotted by almost everyone because of the dangerous circuit. In the 1976 season, Bo Granath scored his last World Cup points: he finished ninth in the 350cc Yugoslavian Grand Prix. In 1977 he became Swedish champion in the 750cc class.
