= List of Grand Prix motorcycle racers: N =

Name	Seasons	World Championships	MotoGP Wins	500cc Wins	350cc Wins	Moto2 Wins	250cc Wins	Moto3 Wins	125cc Wins	80cc Wins	50cc Wins	MotoE Wins
(Japan) Tetsuta Nagashima	2013-2014, 2016-2022	0	0	0	0	1	0	0	0	0	0	0
(Japan) Takaaki Nakagami	2007-2009, 2011-2025	0	0	0	0	2	0	0	0	0	0	0
(Japan) Shinya Nakano	1998-2008	0	0	0	0	0	6	0	0	0	0	0
(Japan) Katsuyuki Nakasuga	2002-2004, 2011-2018	0	0	0	0	0	0	0	0	0	0	0
(Venezuela) Aldo Nannini	1977	0	0	0	0	0	6	0	0	0	0	0
(United Kingdom) Godfrey Nash	1968-1971	0	0	1	0	0	0	0	0	0	0	0
(Spain) Jorge Navarro	2012-2022, 2024-	0	0	0	0	0	0	2	0	0	0	0
(United Kingdom) Billie Nelson	1965, 1967-1974	0	0	0	0	0	0	0	0	0	0	0
(United Kingdom) John Newbold	1974-1980	0	0	1	0	0	0	0	0	0	0	0
(New Zealand) Kim Newcombe	1972-1973	0	0	1	0	0	0	0	0	0	0	0
(Spain) Angel Nieto	1964-1986	13; 50cc - 1969-1970, 1972, 1975-1977; 125cc - 1971-1972, 1979, 1981-1984	0	0	0	0	0	0	62	1	27	0
(Spain) Fonsi Nieto	1997-2004, 2007, 2010	0	0	0	0	0	5	0	0	0	0	0
(Spain) Pablo Nieto	1998-2008	0	0	0	0	0	0	0	1	0	0	0
(France) Erwan Nigon	2000-2005	0	0	0	0	0	0	0	0	0	0	0
(South Africa) Alan North	1975-1977, 1979-1983	0	0	0	1	0	0	0	1	0	0	0
(South Africa) Shane Norval	1998-2000	0	0	0	0	0	0	0	0	0	0	0
(Japan) Noriyasu Numata	1995-1999	0	0	0	0	0	0	0	0	0	0	0
(Finland) Pekka Nurmi	1973, 1975-1982	0	0	0	0	0	0	0	0	0	0	0
