= 1973 Isle of Man TT =

Annual motorcycle racing event

The 1973 Isle of Man TT motorcycle road races were held between 2-8 June 1973 on the 37-mile Snaefell Mountain Course. It was the fifth round of the 1973 FIM Motorcycle Grand Prix World Championship (now MotoGP). In 1973, most of the World Championship contenders were absent from the Isle of Man TT races with the exception of Jack Findlay and the sidecar contenders. The rest joined the reigning 500cc World Champion Giacomo Agostini in boycotting the Isle of Man TT event over safety concerns, despite extensive resurfacing of the circuit. The resurfacing of the circuit allowed an increasing number of competitors to surpass the prestigious 100 mph average lap time.

The racing began on Saturday, 2 June with Production Class racing that consisted of 750, 500 and 250cc machines as well as the 750cc Sidecar Class. Peter Williams led the 750 class on the John Player Norton by half a minute when a gearbox problem forced him to abandon the race allowing Tony Jefferies to take victory riding a Triumph Trident motorcycle known as Slippery Sam. The victory marked the third of five consecutive Isle of Man TT victories for Slippery Sam. Stan Woods (Suzuki) led the 500 class by half a minute, when on the last lap his engine began to misfire, allowing Bill Smith (Honda) to claim the victory. Charlie Williams (Yamaha) won the 250 class. 250 Class competitor John Clarke (Suzuki) was killed in an accident at Union Mills on the first lap. World Champion Klaus Enders and Ralf Engelhardt won the 750 Sidecar Class ahead of his BMW teammates Siegfried Schauzu and Wolfgang Kalauch in second place.

On Monday, 4 June, Charlie Williams rode a Yamaha TZ 250 to win the Lightweight TT while in the 500cc Sidecar TT, Enders set a new lap record and finished the race over 2 minutes ahead of his BMW teammate Schauzu. Tony Rutter won the Junior TT on 6 June in a class dominated by the newly released Yamaha TZ 350. 38-year-old Tommy Robb (Yamaha) won the Ultra-Lightweight TT later that same day, marking the first TT victory of his career which began at the 1958 Isle of Man TT.

The final events of the week were the Formula 750cc TT and the Senior TT held on Friday 8 June. After his abandonment earlier in the week, Peter Williams redeemed himself by setting the second fastest-ever lap of the mountain course at 107.27mph and won the Formula 750cc TT ahead of his John Player Norton teammate Mick Grant. Helmut Dähne scored an impressive ninth place riding a shaft driven BMW R75/5 better known for its long distance touring capabilities. The final race of the week was the Senior TT where 38-year-old veteran Jack Findlay rode a Suzuki TR500 to win the first TT race of his career after Mick Grant (Yamaha) crashed on an oil slick while leading the race at Ramsey Square on the third lap. Peter Williams rode an underpowered but agile single cylinder Matchless G50 prepared by Tom Arter to score an impressive second place result. Williams' average of 100.62 mph was 2.6 seconds quicker than Mike Hailwood's winning speed in 1961 on a Norton Manx, making them the only two competitors at that point in time to have averaged over 100 mph on a single cylinder machine in the Senior TT.

== World championship races ==
=== 1973 Isle of Man Lightweight TT 250cc final standings ===
Monday, 4 June 1973 – 4 Laps (150.92 Miles) Mountain Course.

Place	Rider	Machine	Speed	Time	Points
1	(United Kingdom) Charlie Williams	Yamaha TZ 250	100.05 mph	1.30.30.0	15
2	(United Kingdom) John Williams	Yamaha TZ 250	99.6 mph	1.30.54.6	12
3	(United Kingdom) Bill Rae	Yamaha TZ 250	98.86 mph	1.31.35.4	10
4	(United Kingdom) Derek Chatterton	Yamaha TZ 250	98.00 mph	1.32.23.0	8
5	(United Kingdom) Alex George	Yamaha TZ 250	97.94 mph	1.32.27.0	6
6	(United Kingdom) Tony Rutter	Yamaha TZ 250	97.57 mph	1.32.48.0	5
7	(United Kingdom) Phil Carpenter	Yamaha TZ 250	97.14 mph	1.33.12.8	4
8	(West Germany) Helmut Kassner	Yamaha TZ 250	96.73 mph	1.33.39.6	3
9	(United Kingdom) Tom Herron	Yamaha TZ 250	96.61 mph	1.33.43.4	2
10	(United Kingdom) Barry Randle	Yamaha TZ 250	96.05 mph	1.34.16.2	1

=== 1973 Isle of Man Sidecar 500cc TT final standings ===
Monday 4 June 1973 – 3 Laps (113.00 Miles) Mountain Course.

Place	Rider	Machine	Speed	Time	Points
1	(West Germany) Klaus Enders/Ralf Engelhardt	BMW	94.93 mph	1.11.32.4	15
2	(West Germany) Siegfried Schauzu/Wolfgang Kalauch	BMW	91.4 mph	1.14.18.2	12
3	(West Germany) Rolf Steinhausen/Karl Scheurer	König	89.84 mph	1.15.35.4	10
4	(Belgium) Michel Vanneste/Serge Vanneste	BMW	86.24 mph	1.18.44.6	8
5	(United Kingdom) Robin Williamson/Jack McPherson	BMW	85.05 mph	1.19.50.8	6
6	(United Kingdom) Roger Dutton/Tony Wright	BMW	83.68 mph	1.21.09.4	5
7	(United Kingdom) George O'Dell/N Boldison	BSA	79.82 mph	1.25.04.6	4
8	(United Kingdom) Dick Hawes/Eddie Kiff	Weslake	79.55 mph	1.25.22.0	3
9	(United Kingdom) Roy Woodhouse/Doug Woodhouse	Honda	77.95 mph	1.27.07.4	2
10	(United States) Martin Candy/Eddy Fletcher	BSA	77.73 mph	1.27.22.0	1

=== 1973 Isle of Man Junior TT 350cc final standings ===
Wednesday, 6 1973 – 5 Laps (188.65 Miles) Mountain Course.

Place	Rider	Machine	Speed	Time	Points
1	(United Kingdom) Tony Rutter	Yamaha TZ 350	101.99 mph	1.50.58.8	15
2	(United Kingdom) Ken Huggett	Yamaha TZ 350	100.58 mph	1.52.31.6	12
3	(United Kingdom) John Williams	Yamaha TZ 350	100.32 mph	1.52.49.4	10
4	(United Kingdom) Barry Randle	Yamaha TZ 350	100.011 mph	1.53.10.2	8
5	(United Kingdom) Phil Carpenter	Yamaha TZ 350	99.49 mph	1.53.45.8	6
6	(United Kingdom) Derek Chatterton	Yamaha TZ 350	98.77 mph	1.54.36.0	5
7	(United Kingdom) Alex George	Yamaha TZ 350	98.76 mph	1.54.36.2	4
8	(West Germany) Helmut Kassner	Yamaha TZ 350	96.74 mph	1.57.00.2	3
9	(United Kingdom) Tom Dickie	Yamaha TZ 350	96.68 mph	1.57.04.4	2
10	(United Kingdom) Paul Cott	Yamaha TZ 350	96.41 mph	1.57.24.2	1

=== 1973 Isle of Man Ultra-Lightweight TT 125cc final standings ===
Wednesday, 6 June 1973 – 3 Laps (113.19 Miles) Mountain Course.

Place	Rider	Machine	Speed	Time	Points
1	(United Kingdom) Tommy Robb	Yamaha TA125	88.44 mph	1.16.47.0	15
2	(Netherlands) Jan Kostwinder	Yamaha TA125	87.79 mph	1.17.21.6	12
3	(United Kingdom) Neil Tuxworth	Yamaha TA125	86.56 mph	1.18.27.2	10
4	(United Kingdom) Ivan Hodgkinson	Yamaha TA125	85.49 mph	1.19.26.0	8
5	(United Kingdom) Alan Jones	Maico RS-125	83.3 mph	1.21.31.6	6
6	(United Kingdom) Lindsay Porter	Yamaha TA125	82.54 mph	1.22.16.4	5
7	(United Kingdom) Clive Horton	Yamaha TA125	82.43 mph	1.22.23.2	4
8	(United Kingdom) Richard Stevens	Maico RS-125	82.03 mph	1.22.47.0	3
9	(United Kingdom) Bob Ware	Yamaha TA125	82.02 mph	1.22.48.0	2
10	(United Kingdom) John Kiddie	Honda CB125S	81.69 mph	1.23.07.6	1

=== 1973 Isle of Man Senior TT 500cc final standings ===
Friday 8 June 1973 – 6 Laps (226.38 Miles) Mountain Course.

Place	Rider	Machine	Speed	Time	Points
1	(Australia) Jack Findlay	Suzuki TR500	101.55 mph	2:13.45.2	15
2	(United Kingdom) Peter Williams	Matchless G50	100.62 mph	2:14.59.4	12
3	(United Kingdom) Charlie Sanby	Suzuki TR500	100.27 mph	2:15.27.6	10
4	(United Kingdom) Alex George	Yamaha TZ 350	98.73 mph	2:17.34.20	8
5	(United Kingdom) Roger Nicholls	Suzuki TR500	98.06 mph	2:18.30.20	6
6	(United Kingdom) David Hughes	Matchless G50	96.62 mph	2:20.34.20	5
7	(United Kingdom) Dudley P.Robinson	Suzuki TR500	95.96 mph	2:21.32.80	4
8	(United Kingdom) John Taylor	Suzuki TR500	94.79 mph	2:23.16.80	3
9	(United Kingdom) Selwyn Griffiths	Matchless G50	94.05 mph	2:24.25.20	2
10	(United Kingdom) Graham Bayley	Kawasaki H1R	94.04 mph	2:24.26.20	1

== Non-championship races ==
=== 1973 Isle of Man TT Production 750cc final standings ===
Saturday, 2 June 1973 – 3 Laps (113.00 Miles) Mountain Course.

Place	Rider	Machine	Speed	Time
1	(United Kingdom) Tony Jefferies	"Slippery Sam"	95.62 mph	1.34.41.6
2	(United Kingdom) John Williams	Triumph Trident	94.9 mph	1.35.24.8
3	(United Kingdom) David Dixon	Triumph Trident	91.56 mph	1.38.33.6
4	(West Germany) Helmut Dähne	BMW R90S	90.32 mph	1.40.14.8
5	(United Kingdom) Ernie Pitt	Triumph Trident	89.38 mph	1.41.57.8
6	(United Kingdom) Darryl Pendlebury	Triumph Trident	88.73 mph	1.42.03.0
7	(West Germany) Hans-Otto Butenuth	BMW R90S	87.65 mph	1.43.25.4
8	(United Kingdom) Hugh Evans	Honda CB750	87.27 mph	1.43.45.2
9	(United Kingdom) Roger Corbett	Triumph Trident	86.86 mph	1.44.14.6
10	(United Kingdom) Ken Huggett	Triumph Trident	84.94 mph	1.46.36.4

=== 1973 Isle of Man TT Production 500cc final standings ===
Saturday, 2 June 1973 – 3 Laps (113.00 Miles) Mountain Course.

Place	Rider	Machine	Speed	Time
1	(United Kingdom) Bill Smith	Honda CB500 Four	88.1 mph	1.42.47.0
2	(United Kingdom) Stan Woods	Suzuki T500	88.01 mph	1.42.55.2
3	(United Kingdom) Keith Martin	Kawasaki H1 Mach III	87.87 mph	1.43.02.8
4	(United Kingdom) Clive Brown	BSA B50	87.79 mph	1.43.14.8
5	(United Kingdom) Roger Bowler	Triumph Tiger 100	86.92 mph	1.44.10.2
6	(United Kingdom) Bill Milne	Kawasaki H1 Mach III	85.4 mph	1.46.01.8
7	(United Kingdom) Ray Knight	Triumph Tiger 100	83.05 mph	1.49.01.8
8	(United Kingdom) Nigel Rollason	BSA B50	83.05 mph	1.49.01.8
9	(United Kingdom) John Wilkinson	Suzuki T500	82.98 mph	1.49.02.0
10	(United Kingdom) Godfrey Benson	Suzuki T500	79.55 mph	1.53.49.4

=== 1973 Isle of Man TT Production 250cc final standings ===
Saturday, 2 June 1973 – 3 Laps (113.00 Miles) Mountain Course.

Place	Rider	Machine	Speed	Time
1	(United Kingdom) Charlie Williams	Yamaha RD250	81.76 mph	1.50.45.0
2	(United Kingdom) Eddie Roberts	Yamaha RD250	81.24 mph	1.51.22.0
3	(United Kingdom) Tommy Robb	Yamaha RD250	80.06 mph	1.53.05.8
4	(United Kingdom) Roger Hunter	Suzuki GT250	79.52 mph	1.53.52.2
5	(United Kingdom) Peter Courtney	Kawasaki S1 Mach I	79.05 mph	1.54.32.4
6	(United Kingdom) Phil Carpenter	Honda CB250	78.65 mph	1.55.08.0
7	(United Kingdom) Jim Curry	Honda CB250	78.09 mph	1.55.57.4
8	(United Kingdom) John Kiddie	Honda CB250	77.76 mph	1.56.26.2
9	(United Kingdom) Lindsay Porter	Suzuki GT250	75.54 mph	1.59.51.8
10	(United Kingdom) John Kidson	Honda CB250	75.28 mph	2.00.12.6

=== 1973 Isle of Man Sidecar 750cc TT final standings ===
Saturday, 2 June 1973 – 3 Laps (113.00 Miles) Mountain Course.

Place	Rider	Machine	Speed	Time
1	(West Germany) Klaus Enders/Ralf Engelhardt	BMW	93.01 mph	1.13.00.1
2	(West Germany) Siegfried Schauzu/Wolfgang Kalauch	BMW	91.72 mph	1.14.02.4
3	(United Kingdom) John Brandon/Cliff Holland	Honda	84.75 mph	1.20.08.0
4	(United Kingdom) Mick Boddice/Ken Williams	Kawasaki	84.54 mph	1.20.20.0
5	(United Kingdom) Bill Crook/Kenny Arthur	BSA	83.53 mph	1.21.18.0
6	(United Kingdom) Robin Williamson/Jack McPherson	BMW	83.08 mph	1.21.44.2
7	(United Kingdom) Dick Hawes/Eddie Kiff	Weslake	82.65 mph	1.22.09.8
8	(West Germany) Richard Wegener/Derek Jacobson	BMW	81.35 mph	1.23.29.0
9	(Belgium) Michel Vanneste/Serge Vanneste	BMW	81.24 mph	1.23.35.4
10	(United Kingdom) Mick Potter/Bernie Coverdale	BMW	80.62 mph	1.24.14.2

=== 1973 Isle of Man Formula 750 Classic final standings ===
Friday 8 June 1973 – 5 Laps (188.65 Miles) Mountain Course.

Place	Rider	Machine	Speed	Time
1	(United Kingdom) Peter Williams	John Player Norton	105.47 mph	1.47.19.2
2	(United Kingdom) Mick Grant	John Player Norton	102.56 mph	1.50.21.6
3	(United Kingdom) Tony Jefferies	Triumph Trident	102.04 mph	1.50.55.2
4	(United Kingdom) Charlie Williams	Yamaha TZ 350	102.03 mph	1.50.56.0
5	(United Kingdom) Stan Woods	Suzuki TR750	101.89 mph	1.51.05.2
6	(United Kingdom) Ken Huggett	Yamaha TZ 350	99.69 mph	1.53.32.4
7	(United Kingdom) Geoff Barry	Oakley-Seeley	99.41 mph	1.53.51.4
8	(United Kingdom) Paul Cott	Yamaha TZ 350	97.43 mph	1.56.10.4
9	(West Germany) Helmut Dähne	BMW R75/5	96.79 mph	1.56.56.4
10	(United Kingdom) Graham Bailey	Triumph Trident	96.61 mph	1.57.09.4
