= 1973 Grand Prix motorcycle racing season =

Sports season

1973 F.I.M. Grand Prix motorcycle racing season

Seasons
- ← 1972 1974 →

The 1973 Grand Prix motorcycle racing season was the 25th F.I.M. Road Racing World Championship season.

== Season summary ==
MV Agusta factory rider Phil Read won the first 500 Class World Championship of his career, denying his teammate, Giacomo Agostini, a chance at an eighth consecutive title. Read's victory made him the first competitor to win world championships in the 125 cc, 250 cc and 500 cc classes, a feat only matched by Valentino Rossi. However the season was marred by the deaths of Jarno Saarinen and Renzo Pasolini at the 250 cc Nations Grand Prix held at Monza. Saarinen had won the 1972 250 cc World Championship by one point over Pasolini and their deaths shocked the motorcycle racing community. The 500cc title runner-up, Kim Newcombe, also died while competing in a non-championship race at Silverstone late in the year. 1973 marked the first year that most of the top competitors joined Agostini in boycotting the Isle of Man TT event over safety concerns.

For the first time in years, MV Agusta's dominance of the 500 Class faced a strong challenge in 1973 from the Yamaha factory team. The Yamaha team fielded riders Jarno Saarinen and Hideo Kanaya aboard their new four-cylinder, two-stroke Yamaha YZR500 motorcycle. The MV Agusta team produced the new four cylinder MV Agusta 500 Four for Agostini and Read. Eric Offenstadt continued to campaign a Kawasaki H1R modified with a monocoque chassis of his own design. Suzuki supported rider Jack Findlay racing a Suzuki TR500. Kim Newcombe developed a motorcycle of his own design using a two-stroke outboard motor designed by Dieter König. Numerous privateer racers chose to compete using the Yamaha TZ350 motorcycle bored out to 352cc to make them legal for the 500cc class.

Saarinen demonstrated the new Yamaha's potential with victories in France and Austria to start the 1973 season. Agostini crashed in France while pursuing Saarinen and had to withdraw with mechanical issues in Austria. Read scored his first victory of the year at the third round in West Germany when Saarinen's drive chain broke while he was challenging Read for the lead. Yamaha and Saarinen were leading the World Championship when an accident at the 1973 Nations Grand Prix claimed the lives of Saarinen and Pasolini. The loss of Saarinen caused Yamaha to withdraw their team from the World Championship out of respect for their fallen rider.

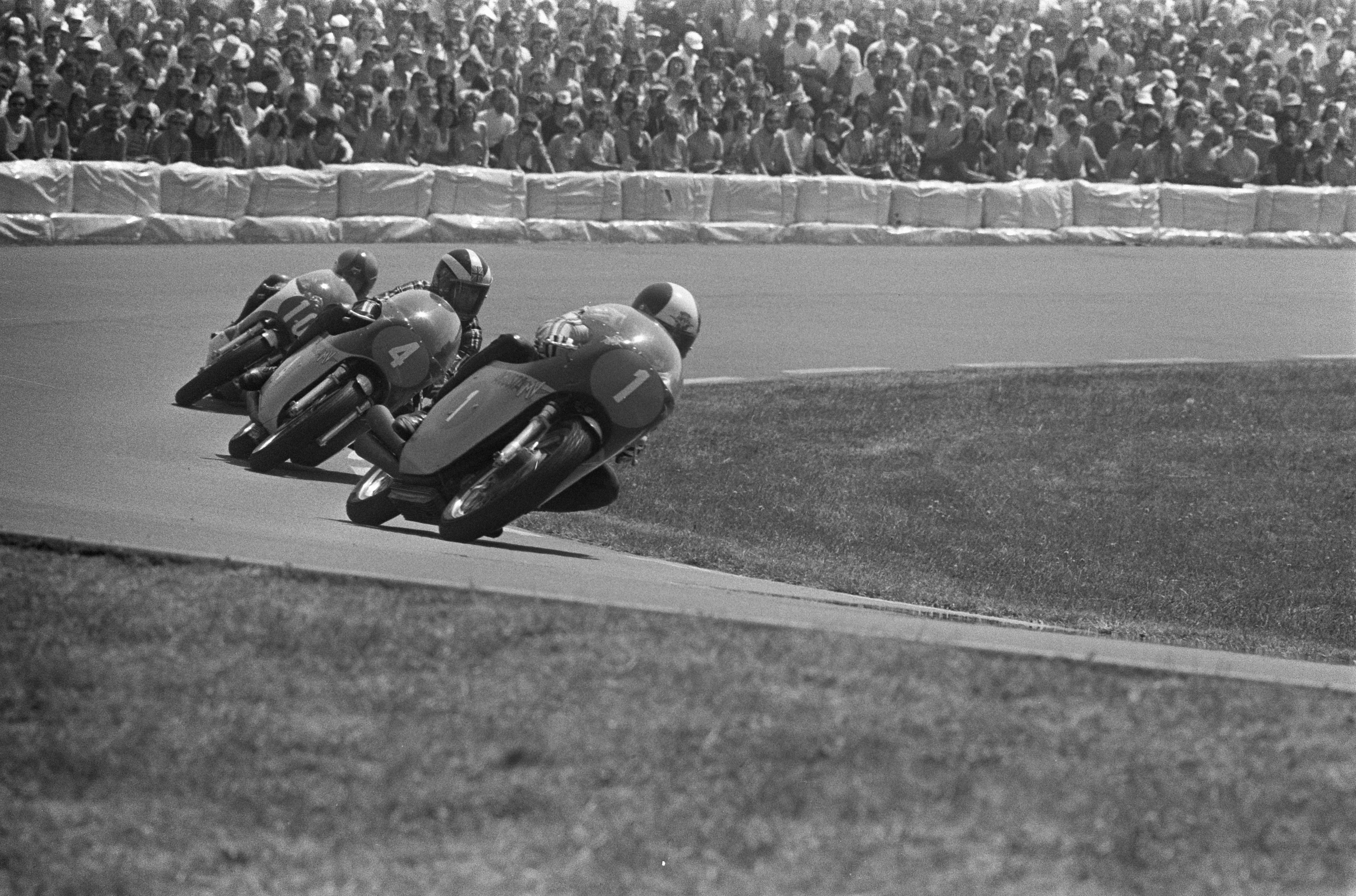
Giacomo Agostini (1) leads Phil Read (4) and Teuvo Länsivuori (10) during the 1973 350cc Dutch TT.

Most of the top contenders joined in Giacomo Agostini's boycott of the fifth round at the Isle of Man TT over safety conditions. Agostini's absence allowed 38-year-old Jack Findlay to win the first Isle of Man Senior TT of his career after 15 previous attempts. Against a field of more powerful, twin cylinder motorcycles, Peter Williams rode an obsolete, single cylinder Matchless G50 to an impressive second place behind Findlay. In the wake of the Monza tragedy, the MV Agusta, Suzuki and Harley-Davidson teams chose to sit out the Yugoslavian Grand Prix over safety conditions at the Opatija Circuit. Kim Newcombe won the Yugoslavian Grand Prix against a reduced field of competitors.

Agostini's mechanical issues along with the cancellation of the 500cc Nations Grand Prix after Saarinen's death and the subsequent boycotts of the Isle of Man TT and the Yugoslavian Grand Prix over unsafe conditions, meant that he did not score any points in the first seven races of the season. Meanwhile, his MV Agusta teammate Read proved to be less than willing to play a subordinate role to Agostini by scoring points at every opportunity, including a victory in Sweden where he relegated Agostini to second place.

Agostini took three victories in the final five races of the season; however, he was unable to overcome his early-season points deficit which allowed Read to claim his first 500 Class World Championship. Read's victory also marked the first time that a World Championship had been won by a motorcycle equipped with disc brakes. Newcombe finished the season strongly to climb to second place in the final championship points standings, five points ahead of Agostini in third place. Newcombe's result marked the third time in four years that a New Zealand rider finished second in the premier class – Ginger Molloy in 1970, Keith Turner in 1971 and Newcombe in 1973.

In the 350cc class, Agostini was able to win his sixth consecutive World Championship although he was no longer as dominant as in previous years. Yamaha introduced the Yamaha TZ350 which in subsequent seasons would become the dominant machine in the 350 class. Yamaha rider Teuvo Länsivuori used the new motorcycle to relegate Agostini to second place with victories in Czechoslovakia and Sweden. In the wake of the death of early championship points leader, Saarinen, Yamaha privateer Dieter Braun won the 250 cc World Championship ahead of Länsivuori.

Kent Andersson gave Yamaha another title in the 125cc class while, 38-year-old Tommy Robb (Yamaha) won the 1973 Ultra-Lightweight TT, marking the first TT victory of his career which began at the 1958 Isle of Man TT. After the Derbi factory withdrew from World Championships in 1972, Jan de Vries (Kreidler) dominated the 50cc class.

=== Monza tragedy ===
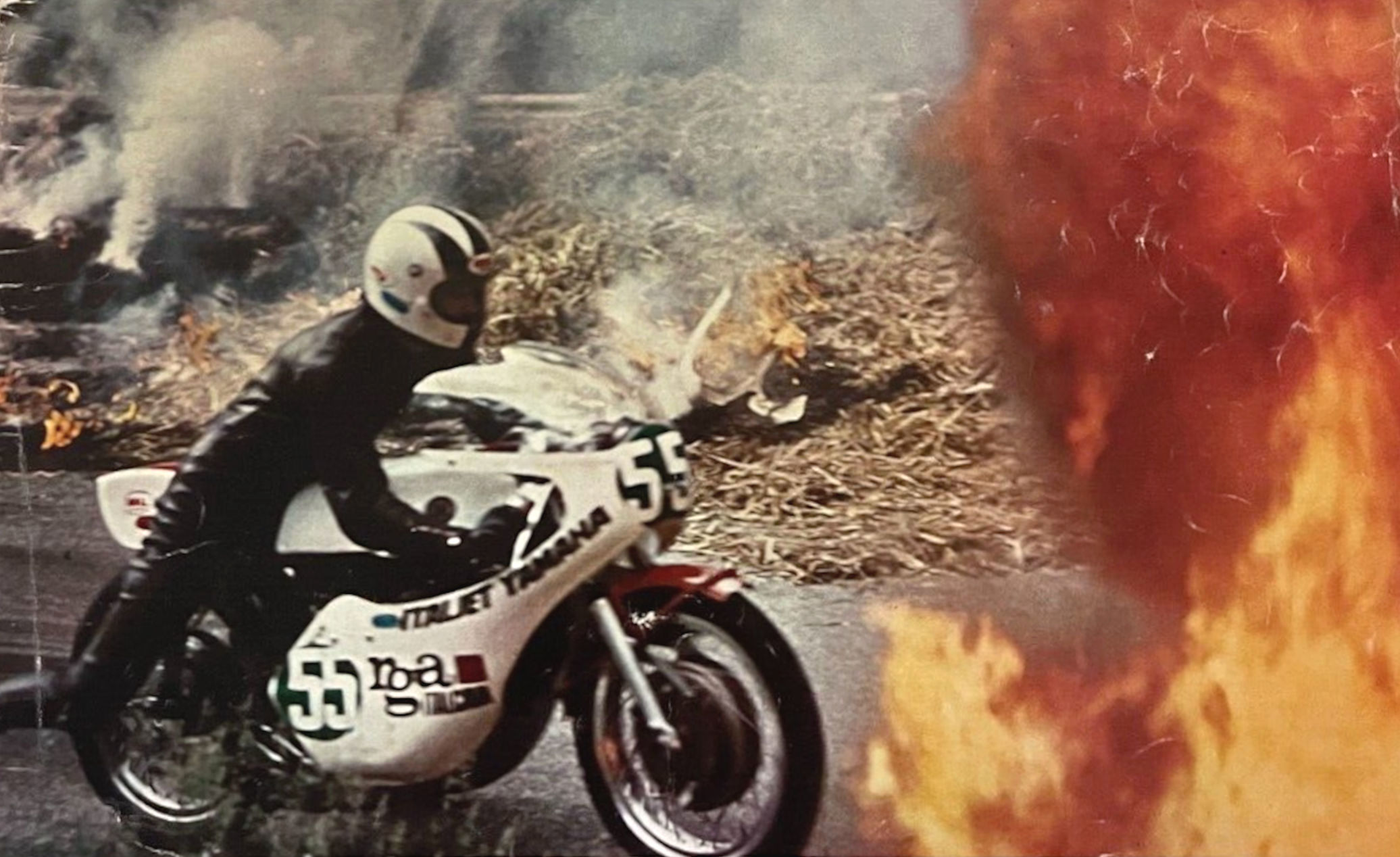
The 250cc race accident in Monza, where Pasolini and Saarinen died

When the Grand Prix season arrived at the Monza Circuit for the fourth round of the World Championship, Saarinen led both the 250 and 500 classes. The Monza Circuit, first opened in 1922, was fast and lined with steel barriers which left no room for error for motorcycle racers. The steel guardrails lining the circuit were installed as a result of demands by automobile racers following an accident which occurred during the 1961 Italian Grand Prix when racing driver Wolfgang von Trips and 15 spectators were killed. Most automobile racers believed steel barriers would improve safety for the racers and spectators, but they had the opposite effect for motorcyclists. When he arrived at Monza, Saarinen had complained about the guardrails, but no action was taken. Despite the installation of two new chicanes for cars during the previous year's Formula One season (placed before the Curva Grande and at Vialone) they were not used for motorcycle racing at Monza.

On the first lap of the 250cc race, tragedy struck when the second-placed rider, Pasolini's motorcycle lurched sideways and crashed into the guardrail, killing him instantly. Pasolini's motorcycle then bounced back onto the circuit and struck Saarinen on his head. The impact knocked off his helmet and he subsequently was hit by another motorbike sustaining fatal injuries. The crash caused a chain reaction accident in which more than 14 riders were involved including; Hideo Kanaya, Walter Villa, Victor Palomo, Fosco Giansanti, Börje Jansson and Chas Mortimer with several of them suffering serious injuries. The race was stopped and the following 500cc race was cancelled in the aftermath of the accident.

Over the years, the cause of the accident was the subject to significant controversy. The original cause of the crash was attributed to a thin layer of motor oil left on the track during the 350cc race when Walter Villa's Benelli began smoking and leaking oil on the penultimate lap. Race officials failed to clean the track prior to the 250cc race, and one rider, John Dodds, made his concerns known to authorities, only to meet with threats of ejection from the circuit by police. However, some articles have appeared showing photos of Pasolini's bike consistent with engine seizure, locking the rear wheel and causing the crash. Further the official inquiry into the accident, issued in September 1973 found that the cause of the accident was the seizure of the engine in the motorcycle of Renzo Pasolini.

The tragedy at Monza was a shock to the motorcycle racing community. Two of the sports best riders had been lost and the factory racing teams of Suzuki, MV Agusta, Harley Davidson, and Yamaha joined to demand safer conditions at race tracks. One month after the Nations Grand Prix, race teams took a stand and boycotted the Yugoslavian Grand Prix held at the Opatija street circuit due to dangerous track conditions.

The death of Gilberto Parlotti at the 1972 Isle of Man TT and the deaths of Saarinen and Pasolini in 1973 highlighted the need for improved safety standards for motorcycle racers. At the time, many motorcycle Grand Prix races were still being held on street circuits with hazards such as telephone poles and railroad crossings. Dedicated race tracks of the time were also dangerous for motorcycle racers due to the steel Armco trackside barriers preferred by car racers. Tensions over safety issues continued to simmer throughout the 1970s between the Grand Prix racers, race organizers and the FIM, as riders showed their increasing dissatisfaction with the safety standards and the way races were organized by boycotting several Grand Prix races.

== 1973 Grand Prix season calendar ==
Round	Date	Race	Location	50cc winner	125cc winner	250cc winner	350cc winner	500cc winner	Report
1	22 April	(France) French Grand Prix	Paul Ricard		(Sweden) Kent Andersson	(Finland) Jarno Saarinen	(Italy) Giacomo Agostini	(Finland) Jarno Saarinen	Report
2	6 May	(Austria) Austrian Grand Prix	Salzburgring		(Sweden) Kent Andersson	(Finland) Jarno Saarinen	(Hungary) János Drapál	(Finland) Jarno Saarinen	Report
3	13 May	(West Germany) West German Grand Prix	Hockenheimring	(Netherlands) Theo Timmer	(Sweden) Kent Andersson	(Finland) Jarno Saarinen	(Finland) Teuvo Länsivuori	(United Kingdom) Phil Read	Report
4	20 May	(Italy) Nations Grand Prix	Monza	(Netherlands) Jan de Vries	(Sweden) Kent Andersson	Race cancelled (Note: The 250cc race was stopped, following an accident on the first lap that resulted in the deaths of Jarno Saarinen and Renzo Pasolini. The race meeting was ultimately cancelled.)	(Italy) Giacomo Agostini	Race cancelled	Report
5	8 June	(United Kingdom) Isle of Man TT	Snaefell Mountain		(United Kingdom) Tommy Robb	(United Kingdom) Charlie Williams	(United Kingdom) Tony Rutter	(Australia) Jack Findlay	Report
6	17 June	(Socialist Federal Republic of Yugoslavia) Yugoslavian Grand Prix	Opatija	(Netherlands) Jan de Vries	(Sweden) Kent Andersson	(West Germany) Dieter Braun	(Hungary) János Drapál	(New Zealand) Kim Newcombe	Report
7	23 June	(Netherlands) Dutch TT	Assen	(Switzerland) Bruno Kneubühler	(Italy) Eugenio Lazzarini	(West Germany) Dieter Braun	(Italy) Giacomo Agostini	(United Kingdom) Phil Read	Report
8	1 July	(Belgium) Belgian Grand Prix	Spa	(Netherlands) Jan de Vries	(Netherlands) Jos Schurgers	(Finland) Teuvo Länsivuori		(Italy) Giacomo Agostini	Report
9	15 July	(Czechoslovakia) Czechoslovak Grand Prix	Brno		(Italy) Otello Buscherini	(West Germany) Dieter Braun	(Finland) Teuvo Länsivuori	(Italy) Giacomo Agostini	Report
10	21 July	(Sweden) Swedish Grand Prix	Anderstorp	(Netherlands) Jan de Vries	(Sweden) Börje Jansson	(West Germany) Dieter Braun	(Finland) Teuvo Länsivuori	(United Kingdom) Phil Read	Report
11	29 July	(Finland) Finnish Grand Prix	Imatra		(Italy) Otello Buscherini	(Finland) Teuvo Länsivuori	(Italy) Giacomo Agostini	(Italy) Giacomo Agostini	Report
12	23 September	(Spain) Spanish Grand Prix	Jarama	(Netherlands) Jan de Vries	(United Kingdom) Chas Mortimer	(Australia) John Dodds	(Brazil) Adu Celso	(United Kingdom) Phil Read	Report

Footnotes

== Final standings ==
=== Scoring system ===
Points were awarded to the top ten finishers in each race. Only the best of five results were counted in the Sidecars championship, while only the best of four results were counted in the 50cc championship. The best of seven results were counted in the 125cc championship while only the top six results were counted in the 250cc, 350cc and 500cc championships.

(key)

Position	1st	2nd	3rd	4th	5th	6th	7th	8th	9th	10th
Points	15	12	10	8	6	5	4	3	2	1

=== 500cc final standings ===
Place	Rider	Team	Machine	FRA (France)	AUT (Austria)	GER (Germany)	NAC (Italy)	MAN (United Kingdom)	YUG (Socialist Federal Republic of Yugoslavia)	HOL (Netherlands)	BEL (Belgium)	CZE (Czech Republic)	SWE (Sweden)	FIN (Finland)	ESP (Spain)	Pts
1	(United Kingdom) Phil Read	MV Agusta	MV500	2	Ret	1			DNS	1	2	2	1	2	1	84
2	(New Zealand) Kim Newcombe	König	König 500	5	3	Ret			1	2	4	Ret	3	4		63
3	(Italy) Giacomo Agostini	MV Agusta	MV500	Ret	Ret	Ret			DNS	Ret	1	1	2	1	Ret	57
4	(Switzerland) Werner Giger		TZ350	Ret	6	2			5	6	Ret	Ret	5	7	3	44
5	(Australia) Jack Findlay	Suzuki	TR500	10	Ret	Ret		1	Ret	5	3	5	Ret	Ret	Ret	38
6	(Switzerland) Bruno Kneubühler		TZ350	Ret	9	Ret					Ret	3	Ret	3	2	34
7	(Finland) Jarno Saarinen	Yamaha NV	YZR500	1	1	Ret										30
8	(Japan) Hideo Kanaya	Yamaha NV	YZR500	3	2	Ret										22
9	(West Germany) Ernst Hiller	König	König 500	19	Ret	3				Ret	7			6		19
9	(United Kingdom) Alex George	Hermetite Ltd	TZ350	Ret		9		4	6		11	14	Ret	Ret	7	19
9	(United Kingdom) Billie Nelson		TZ350	9	8	5			Ret	8	10	Ret	7	10	Ret	19
12	(France) Christian Bourgeois		TZ350	Ret						3	Ret	Ret	6	9	Ret	17
12	(France) Eric Offenstadt	Kawasaki-France	H1R-RW	7		Ret				9	Ret	4	Ret	8	Ret	17
14	(Italy) Guido Mandracci		TR500	6	4	Ret						Ret	Ret	Ret	Ret	15
15	(United Kingdom) Peter Williams	Tom Arter	Matchless G50					2								15
15	(United Kingdom) Steve Ellis		TZ350						2		Ret	Ret	Ret	Ret	Ret	14
15	(Sweden) Bo Granath		Husqvarna	12	7				Ret	Ret	14	8	Ret	13	6	13
18	(West Germany) Paul Eickelberg	König	König 500	Ret	Ret	Ret			14	Ret	6	Ret		5	Ret	10
19	(Italy) Gianfranco Bonera		TZ350						3				Ret		Ret	10
19	(Finland) Seppo Kangasniemi		TZ350	22					4	13			9	12		10
21	(Denmark) Børge Nielsen		TZ350		DSQ				Ret		Ret		4		10	9
21	(West Germany) Georg Pohlmann		TZ350			4				10						9
23	(France) Christian Léon	Kawasaki-France	H1R-RW	4												8
23	(Netherlands) Wil Hartog		TZ350							4						8
23	(United Kingdom) Chas Mortimer		TZ350	Ret								15	Ret	11	4	8
23	(Netherlands) Marcel Ankoné		TZ350								9				5	8
27	(Italy) Roberto Gallina		TZ350	Ret	5				Ret	Ret	Ret		Ret			6
27	(United Kingdom) Michel Rougerie	Aermacchi-Harley-Davidson	RR500	Ret						Ret	5					6
27	(United Kingdom) Roger Nichols	TWS-Suzuki	TR500					5								6
30	(West Germany) Reinhard Hiller	König	König 500	Ret	Ret	6				Ret	Ret					5
30	(United Kingdom) Dave Hughes	Tom Arter	Matchless G50					6								5
30	(Czech Republic) Bohumil Staša		TZ350									6			Ret	5
33	(Italy) Mario Lega		TZ350									7			Ret	4
33	(Switzerland) Gyula Marsovszky		TZ350	Ret	Ret				7	Ret	13			Ret	Ret	4
33	(United Kingdom) Donnie Robinson	Crooks-Suzuki	TR500					7								4
33	(West Germany) Peter Stocksiefen		TR500			7										4
33	(United Kingdom) Derek Chatterton		TZ350					Ret		7						4
33	(Netherlands) Peter van der Wal		TZ350								8	10			Ret	4
33	(Sweden) Sven Gunnarsson		H1R-RW	15	11	10			Ret		15	Ret	8	Ret	Ret	4
40	(France) Jean-François Baldé		TZ350	8												3
40	(United Kingdom) Derek Lee		TR500	18		13			8		16					3
40	(Sweden) Ivan Carlsson		TZ350						Ret	Ret			Ret		8	3
40	(West Germany) Udo Kochanski	König	König 500			8										3
40	(United Kingdom) John Taylor		Seeley TR500					8								3
45	(West Germany) Ted Jansen	König	König 500						9					Ret		2
45	(United Kingdom) Selwyn Griffiths	Ray Cowles Motorcycles	Matchless G50					9								2
45	(France) Jean Paul Boinet		H1R-RW												9	2
45	(West Germany) Lothar John		TR500			Ret				15	12	9			Ret	2
49	(United Kingdom) Graham Bailey		H1R-RW					10								1
49	(Sweden) Bo Brolin		TR500										10			1
49	(Austria) Hans Maxwald		Rotax	11	10	Ret						Ret			Ret	1
49	(Netherlands) Jerome Van Halter		TR500						10		18					1
-	(United Kingdom) Charlie Sanby		TR500					3								-
Place	Rider	Team	Machine	FRA (France)	AUT (Austria)	GER (Germany)	NAC (Italy)	MAN (United Kingdom)	YUG (Socialist Federal Republic of Yugoslavia)	HOL (Netherlands)	BEL (Belgium)	CZE (Czech Republic)	SWE (Sweden)	FIN (Finland)	ESP (Spain)	Pts
Sources: Notes: The 1973 500cc Nations Grand Prix was cancelled after the deaths of Saarinen and Pasolini in the 350 race. The major factory teams refused to participate in the Yugoslavian Grand Prix in a dispute over safety conditions at the Opatija Circuit. Charlie Sanby scored a third-place result at the 1973 Isle of Man Senior TT but is excluded from the FIM championship final standings, because he only held a domestic racing license rather than a full international Grand Prix license.

=== 1973 350 cc Roadracing World Championship final standings ===
Place	Rider	Number	Country	Machine	Points	Wins
1	(Italy) Giacomo Agostini	1	Italy	MV Agusta 350	84	4
2	(Finland) Teuvo Länsivuori	7	Finland	Yamaha TZ350	77	3
3	(United Kingdom) Phil Read	5	United Kingdom	MV Agusta 350	56	0
4	(Australia) John Dodds		Australia	Yamaha TZ350	49	0
5	(United Kingdom) Billie Nelson		United Kingdom	Yamaha TZ350	38	0
6	(Sweden) Kent Andersson		Sweden	Yamaha TZ350	38	0
7	(Brazil) Adu Celso-Santos		Brazil	Yamaha TZ350	33	1
8	(West Germany) Dieter Braun	8	West Germany	Yamaha TZ350	33	0
9	(Hungary) János Drapál		Hungary	Yamaha TZ350	30	2
10	(Finland) Pentti Korhonen		Finland	Yamaha TZ350	25	0

=== 1973 250 cc Roadracing World Championship final standings ===
Place	Rider	Number	Country	Machine	Points	Wins
1	(West Germany) Dieter Braun		West Germany	Yamaha TZ250	80	4
2	(Finland) Teuvo Länsivuori	5	Finland	Yamaha TZ250	64	2
3	(Australia) John Dodds	6	Australia	Yamaha TZ250	58	1
4	(Finland) Jarno Saarinen	1	Finland	Yamaha TZ250	45	3
5	(France) Michel Rougerie		France	Aermacchi-Harley-Davidson RR250	45	0
6	(United Kingdom) Chas Mortimer		United Kingdom	Yamaha TZ250	40	0
7	(Japan) Hideo Kanaya	11	Japan	Yamaha TZ250	36	0
8	(Italy) Roberto Gallina		Italy	Yamaha TZ250	32	0
9	(Switzerland) Bruno Kneubühler		Switzerland	Yamaha TZ250	28	0
10	(Italy) Silvio Grassetti	4	Italy	Yamaha TZ250	21	0

=== 1973 125 cc Roadracing World Championship final standings ===
Place	Rider	Number	Country	Machine	Points	Wins
1	(Sweden) Kent Andersson	2	Sweden	Yamaha TA125	99	5
2	(United Kingdom) Chas Mortimer		United Kingdom	Yamaha TA125	75	1
3	(Netherlands) Jos Schurgers	9	Netherlands	Bridgestone	70	1
4	(Sweden) Börje Jansson	4	Sweden	Maico	64	1
5	(Italy) Eugenio Lazzarini		Italy	Maico	59	1
6	(Italy) Otello Buscherini		Italy	Malanca	51	2
7	(Spain) Angel Nieto		Spain	Morbidelli	46	0
8	(West Germany) Rolf Minhoff	4	West Germany	Maico	42	0
9	(Finland) Matti Salonen		Finland	Yamaha TA125	32	0
10	(Finland) Pentti Salonen		Finland	Yamaha TA125	28	0

=== 1973 50 cc Roadracing World Championship final standings ===
Place	Rider	Number	Country	Machine	Points	Wins
1	(Netherlands) Jan de Vries	2	Netherlands	Kreidler	60	5
2	(Switzerland) Bruno Kneubühler		Switzerland	Kreidler	51	1
3	(Netherlands) Theo Timmer	3	Netherlands	Jamathi	47	1
4	(West Germany) Gerhard Thurow		West Germany	Kreidler	36	0
5	(Netherlands) Henk van Kessel		Netherlands	Kreidler	27	0
6	(West Germany) Herbert Rittberger		West Germany	Kreidler	22	0
7	(Switzerland) Ulrich Graf		Switzerland	Kreidler	21	0
8	(Netherlands) Jan Huberts	8	Netherlands	Kreidler	21	0
9	(West Germany) Rudolf Kunz	9	West Germany	Kreidler	14	0
10	(West Germany) Wolfgang Gedlich		West Germany	Kreidler	13	0
