= Bridgestone (motorcycle) =

Brand of motorcycles produced by the Japanese tire manufacturer between 1952 and 1970

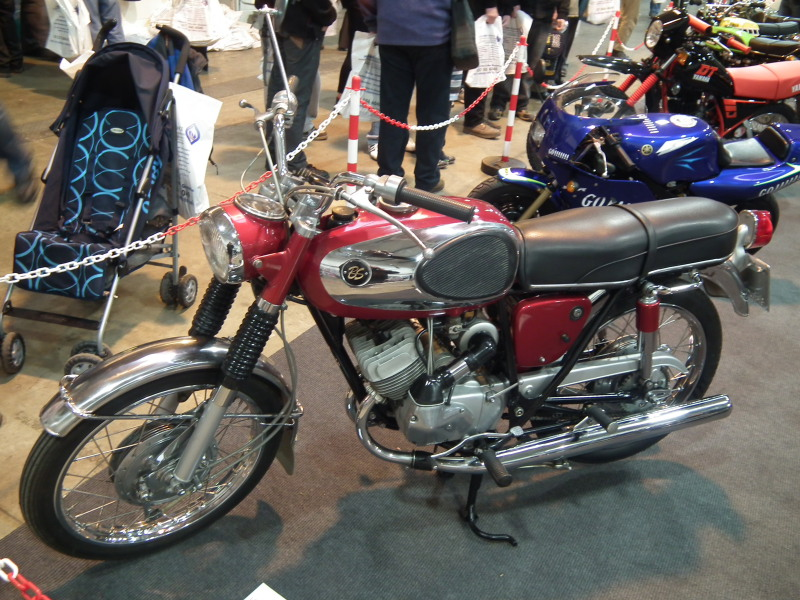
- Bridgestone motorcycle
- Trade name: BS
- Industry: Motorcycle manufacturer
- Founded: 1952
- Defunct: 1970
- Headquarters: Kyobashi, Tokyo, Japan

Bridgestone motorcycles were a division of the Bridgestone Tire Co. of Kyōbashi, Tokyo, Japan that produced mopeds and motorcycles from 1952 to 1970. Initially producing power assisted bicycles, the division moved on to producing mopeds and then motorcycles. The motorcycles were technologically advanced and powered by two-stroke engines. The high technical specification resulted in the machines being more expensive compared to other manufacturers models. Production was stopped in 1970 to protect the supply of tyres to other manufacturers.

== History ==
In 1946 the tyre manufacturer Bridgestone started to produce bicycles and in 1949 the Bridgestone Cycle Company was formed. In 1950 an agreement was formed with Fuji Seimitsu Jogyo (Fuji Precision Engineering Company - now part of Nissan) to supply auxiliary engines for these bicycles. Initially the engines were supplied separately but from 1952 Bridgestone produced a bicycle fitted with the engine, the BS21 Bambi. The 26 cc engine was mounted above the rear wheel and was inverted. The rear wheel was driven by a friction drive on the tyre. 38 cc BS-31 and 49 cc BS-41 were later added.

In 1958 the first motorcycles were produced. The initial model, BS Champion, had a pressed-steel frame and was powered by a fan-cooled 50-cc two-stroke engine.

Most of the production was exported to the USA. The US importer was Rockford Motors in Rockford, Illinois. Bridgestone tyre suppliers to the "big four" (Honda, Suzuki, Yamaha and Kawasaki), and following pressure from those companies, Bridgestone agreed not to compete with them in the home market.

In the early 1960s, the Japanese motorcycle industry took a downturn. Bridgestone's core business of tyre manufacture kept the company secure and they took on engineers from Lilac and Tohatsu when those companies stopped motorcycle production. These engineers were responsible for a new range of motorcycle, initially with the 90 cc BS-90 in 1965. This was followed by the BS-50 and BS-175 in 1965 and the BS-350 in 1967. These machines were powered by state of the art disc valve two strokes which Tohatsu had previously been involved in.

=== Closure ===
The advanced technical specification resulted in high production costs and a resulting high retail price. The 350 GTR sold in some areas at about the same price as the 650 cc Triumph Bonneville. The high price caused the motorcycles to sell in smaller quantities than other Japanese motorcycles. The other Japanese motorcycle companies again pressured Bridgestone, this time to either supply them tyres or to manufacture motorcycles but not both. In order to protect its interests supplying tyres to other manufacturers, Bridgestone pulled out of motorcycle manufacturing in 1970. The factory space was converted to tyre production.

The remaining stock of motorcycles and some spares were sold to Rockford Motors in the US who continued to sell the machines until stocks ran out. Some machines were sent unpainted and finished in the US.

Tooling and manufacturing rights for the 60cc and 100cc machines were sold to BS Tailung in Taiwan. Tailung manufactured the engines and mounted them in their own cycle parts to make trail and mini-bikes. These were sold to Rockford who marketed them as the Chibi, Taka and Tora. Production ceased in 1975.

== Models ==
=== 50 cc models ===
The first "real" Bridgestone was introduced in 1958; the 50 cc Champion. The model had a pressed steel frame, a shrouded, fan-cooled two-stroke engine with a 3 speed gearbox. The model was updated in 1962 and designated the Champion-III. From 1963 these were imported into the United States by the Rockford company. The Champion was marketed as Bridgestone Super 7 in the US, and was available with an electric starter. and a step-through model, the Homer, was introduced.

A new 50 cc model was introduced in 1965. Introduced at the same time as the 90 cc model, it also used rotary disc-valve induction. Gearbox was now a four speed item and telescopic forks were fitted. It was designated the 50+ Sport. A step through version was also introduced which had a 3 speed gearbox and automatic clutch.

=== 60 cc models ===
An enlarged version of the 50 cc model was introduced in 1966. Engine output was 5.8 bhp compared to 4.2 bhp from the 50 cc.

=== 90 cc models ===
The engineers Bridgestone employed that had previously worked for Tohatsu brought a lot of knowledge about fast two-strokes from Tohatsu's racing activities. In 1965 a new 90cc model was produced. The single cylinder two-stroke engine was fitted with a rotary valve and produced 7.8 bhp. The frame was made from pressed steel and telescopic forks fitted. A variant with a high level exhaust, the Mountaineer, was also produced.

=== 100 cc models ===
Introduced in 1967, the 100+ Sport was an overbored version of the 90 cc model giving 10% more power. A limited edition 100+ Racer was available, which had a tuned engine with hand polished ports and s special carburettor.

The model later gained a tubular frame and was available in road trim, as the 100 G/P-7, and as a street scrambler trim with s high level exhaust as the 100 TMX-7.

=== 177 cc Dual Twin ===
The 177 cc Dual Twin was introduced in 1965. The engine was virtually a doubling up of the 90cc engine. The engine used rotary valves to control the inlet with the carburettors mounted by the ends of the crankshaft. This configuration required the generator to be positioned above the engine behind the cylinders. Cylinder bores were chrome-plated. This was the first Bridgestone model to use the "oil injection" system. Instead of the oil being mixed with the petrol as was normal for two-strokes of that time, oil was stored in a separate tank and pumped into the engine.

The name "Dual Twin" derives from the gearbox. In normal use the gearbox was 4 speed "rotary" item. Changing up from 4th gear brought the gearbox back to neutral. A second lever, the "Sport-Shift", could be used to convert the gearbox to a conventional 5 speed gearbox (without the ability to change from top gear to neutral).

A "street scrambler" version was available with high level exhausts. This variant was designated the 175 Hurricane.

A limited edition 175+ Racer was produced in 1967. This model had a tuned engine, including modified disc valves and hand-polished ports.

=== 200 Mach II ===
Bridgestone unveiled a prototype 200 cc cafe racer at the 1966 Tokyo Motor Show. The engine was based on the 177cc Dual Twin, overbored to 198 cc. The prototype was never put into production, but the following year the engine was put into the Dual Twin running gear to create the 200 Mach II. This was available as the RS (Road Sport) and SS (Street Scrambler) models.

=== 350 GTR and 350 GTO ===
Introduced in 1967, the 350 GTR was powered by an air-cooled, 345 cc (21.1 cu in), two-stroke, straight-twin engine, which produced 37 hp (27.6 kW; 37.5 PS) at 7,500 rpm. The engine used the rotary disc-valve induction system, two of these disc valves were used (one per cylinder), and a 26 mm Mikuni carburettor was bolted to each one. The six-speed gearbox was also a plus point, as was the ability for the 350 GTR's riders to use either their left foot or their right foot to change gear; the gear lever and rear brake pedals could be swapped around in order to allow this. However, the gearbox did cause issues for some riders, as neutral was located in an unusual place; at the top of the gearbox, as most motorcycles placed this gear between first and second. Chassis-wise, the 350 GTR was fairly conventional, as it used a steel twin-cradle frame, gaitered front forks with twin shock absorbers at the rear, 19" wheels and drum brakes.

The GTO model was introduced as a variant in 1967 and was fitted with high level exhausts.

== Road racing ==
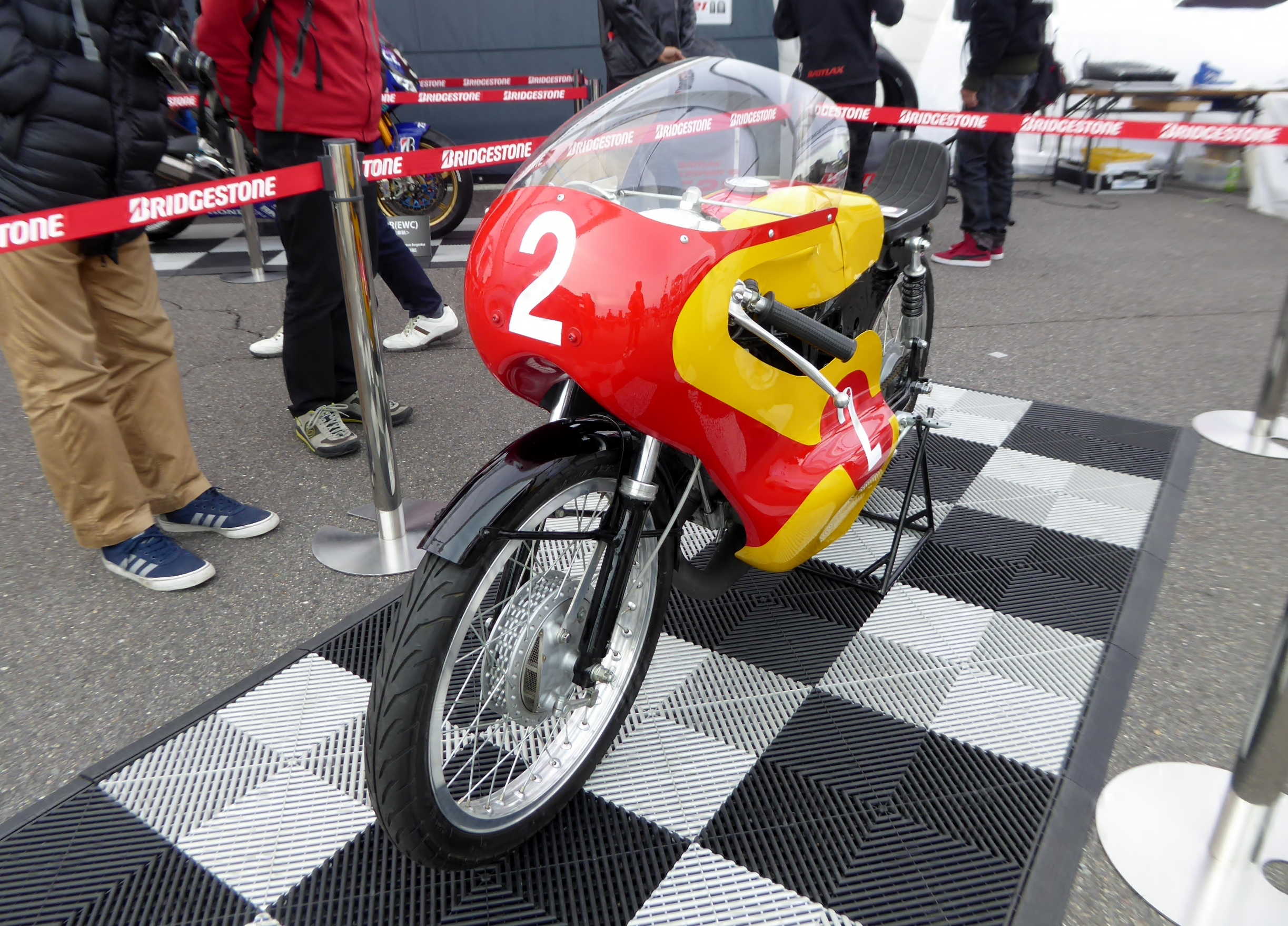
Bridgestone 90 cc racing motorcycle

To gain publicity for their motorcycles, Bridgestone's management decided to set a road racing programme with their machines. A race shop was set up, some of the engineers had previously been employed in Tohatsu's racing department.

The racing shop built a 50 cc racer based on Tohatsu's 50cc twin-cylinder racer. Knowing the weaknesses of the Tohatsu machine, the new engine was designed to overcome these issues. The main problem was overheating, so water-cooling was used for the cylinders and heads. A race kit was also developed for the 90 cc production engine.

The racers were first tried at the new Fisco circuit (now Fuji Speedway) in March 1966. The machines won both the 50 cc and 90 cc novice races and also the 50 cc experts race. The next outing was at the non-championship Malaysian GP at Easter that year. Six 50 cc machines were entered, riders included former Suzuki riders Isao Morishita and Mitsuo Itoh. Good results in Malaysia encouraged the team to try some of the European GPs. The team arrived in Britain to participate in the 1966 Isle of Man TT, but the event was postponed due to a seamen's strike. By this time the machines could rev to 18,000 rpm and were fitted with 10 speed gearboxes.

At the Dutch TT at Assen, 3 machines were entered. Riders were Morishita, Tommy Robb and Steve Murray, with Jack Findlay as reserve. In the race the machines were no match for the Hondas and Suzukis, Morishita finished 6th, Findlay (who had substituted for Robb) 8th and Murray crashed out. At the final race of the season at Fisco Honda withdrew over concerns about the circuit's safety. Suzuki dominated the race and the Bridgestones of Robb, Findlay and Morishita finished 5th, 6th and 7th. Although the factory had previously intended to compete in the 1967 season, the lack of success led the factory to withdraw from racing.

In 1969, Wynn Richards, in conjunction with Rob Todd (known for his tuning of BSA Bantams), produced a limited batch of "Altair" racers, which were powered by a highly tuned 350 GTR engine. The engines produced 60 bhp.

In the early 1970s, the top two-stroke tuners were based in the Netherlands. Race-prepared 177 Dual Twin machines, sleeved down to 125 cc, were raced by Dutchmen Jos Schurgers and Henk van Kessel from 1972 to 1975. They had some success, the best season being 1973 when Schurgers won the Belgian GP and finished 3rd in the championship. Schurgers later fitted overbored cylinders and heads from a water-cooled 50 cc Kreidler.

== Bibliography ==
- Brown, Roland (2007). "1967 Bridgestone 350 GTR - Classic Japanese Motorcycles". Motorcycle Classics. No. March/April.
- Carroll, John (1997). The motorcycle : a definitive history : a comprehensive chronicle of motorcycles throughtout [sic] the world. New York, N.Y.: Smithmark. ISBN 978-0-8317-6292-6.
- Tragatsch, Erwin (1977). The complete illustrated encyclopedia of the world's motorcycles. New York: Holt, Rinehart and Winston. ISBN 978-0-03-019296-8.
- Walker, Mick (2002). Mick Walker's Japanese grand prix racing motorcycles. Tyne & Wear: Redline Books. ISBN 978-0-9531311-8-1.
- Walker, Mick (2004). Japanese Production Racing Motorcycles. Redline Books. ISBN 978-0-9544357-0-7.
- Weeks, Graham (1996). "Bridgestone Cycle Company - A Potted History". bridgestone.skew.org.
- Williams, Greg (July 2015). "Language Barrier: The 1971 Bridgestone Mach II SS". Motorcycle Classics.
