= Jan de Vries (motorcyclist) =

Dutch motorcycle racer (1944–2021)

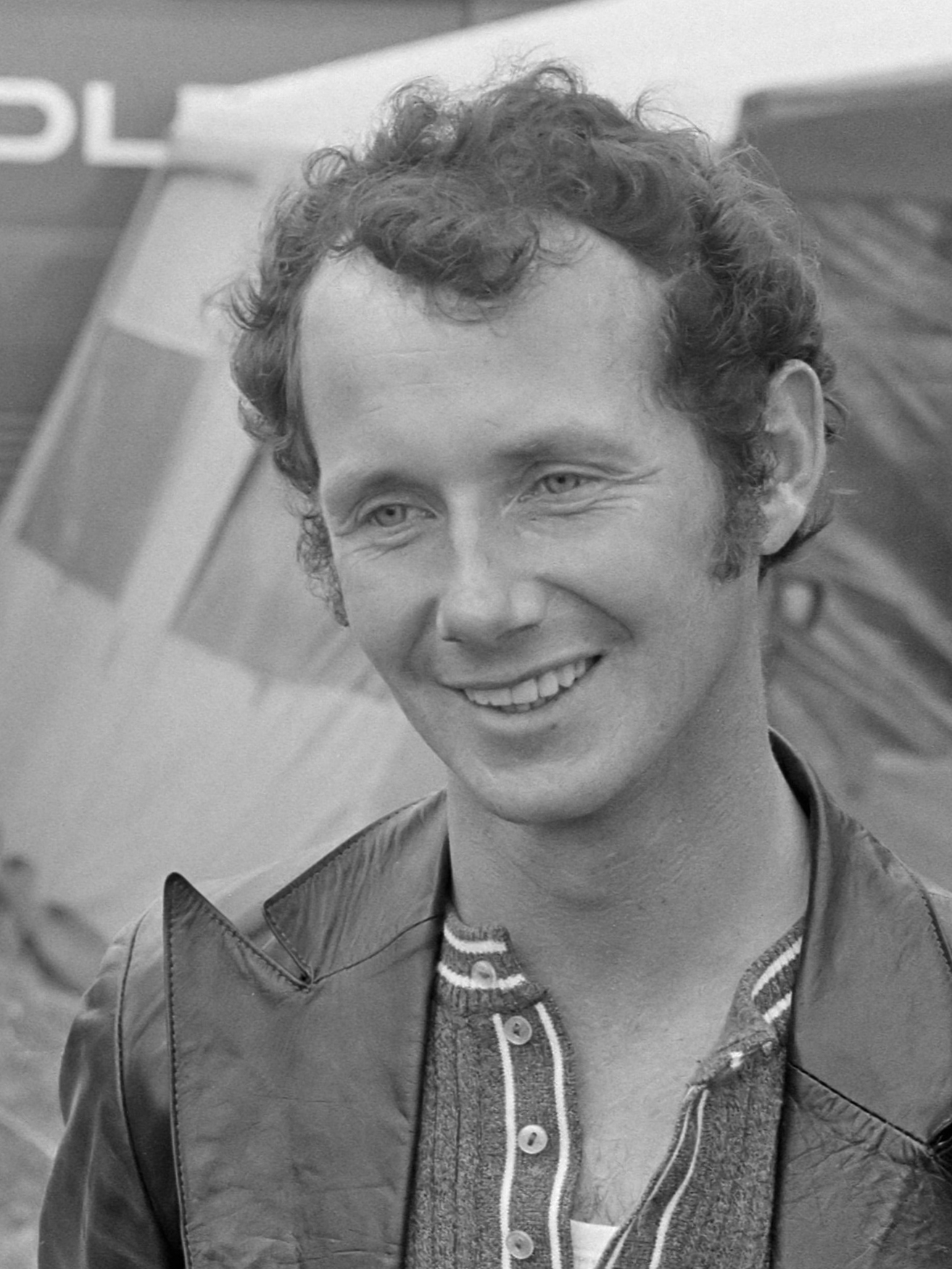
- Jan de Vries in 1971
- Nationality: Dutch
- Born: 5 January 1944; Sint Jacobiparochie, Netherlands
- Died: 14 January 2021 (aged 77); Purmerend, Netherlands
Motorcycle racing career statistics
Grand Prix motorcycle racing
Active years	1968–1973
First race	1968 50cc Dutch TT
Last race	1973 50cc Spanish Grand Prix
First win	1970 50cc Nations Grand Prix
Last win	1973 50cc Spanish Grand Prix
Team(s)	Kreidler, MZ
Championships	50cc - 1971, 1973
Starts / Wins / Podiums / Poles / F. laps / Points; 36 / 14 / 27 / 0 / 13 / 332

Jan de Vries (5 January 1944 – 14 January 2021) was a Dutch Grand Prix motorcycle road racer.

== Career ==
In 1971, de Vries became the first Dutchman to win a F.I.M. world championship when he claimed the 50 cc title. In 1973, he won another 50 cc world championship.

De Vries lost the 1972 world championship to Angel Nieto by the narrowest of margins. The two riders ended the season tied with 69 points and three victories apiece. The championship was decided on aggregate times, with Nieto given the title by mere seconds.

== Gallery ==
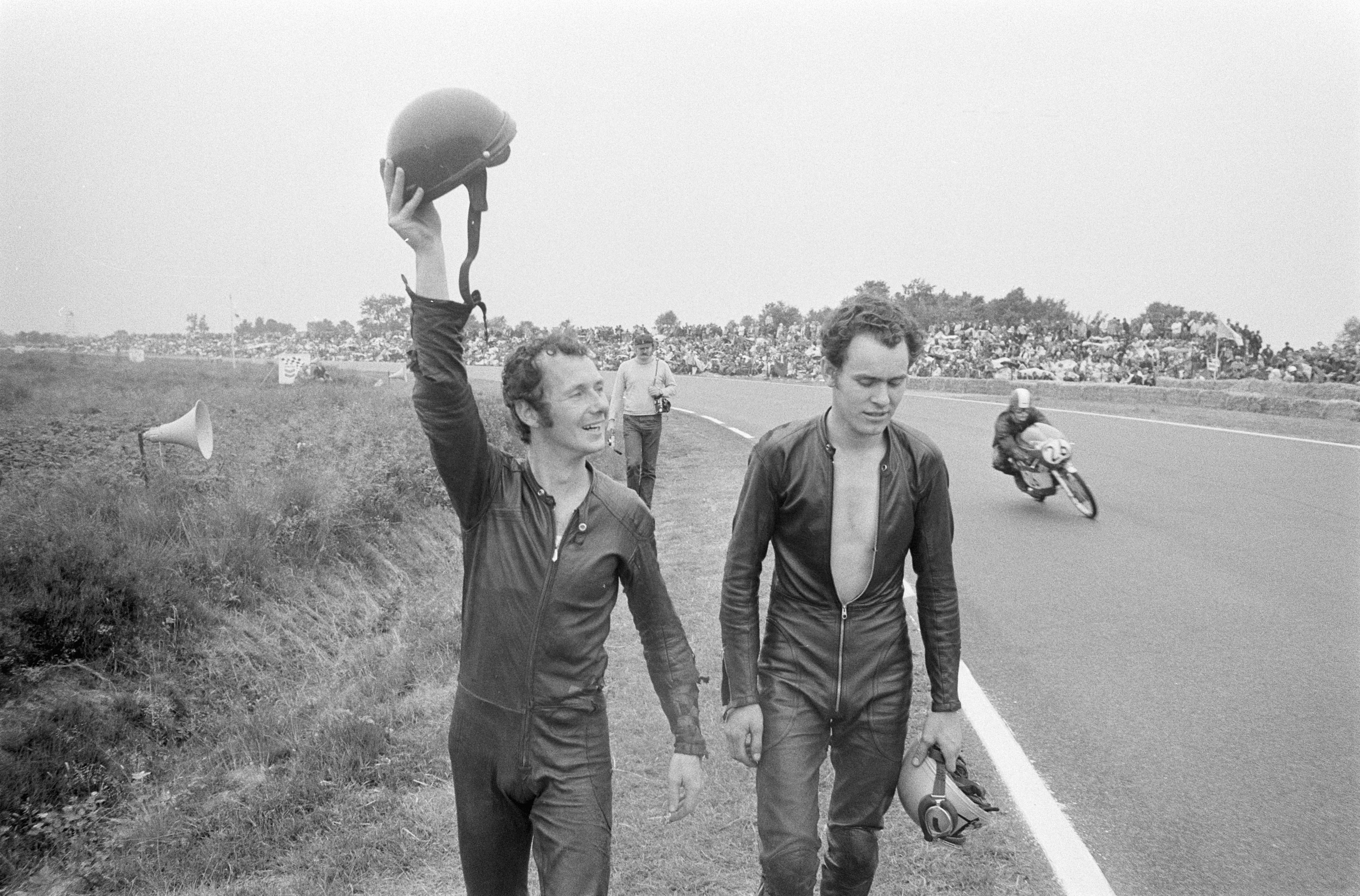
Jan de Vries after a crash in Assen in 1971, to the right is Henk van Kessel.

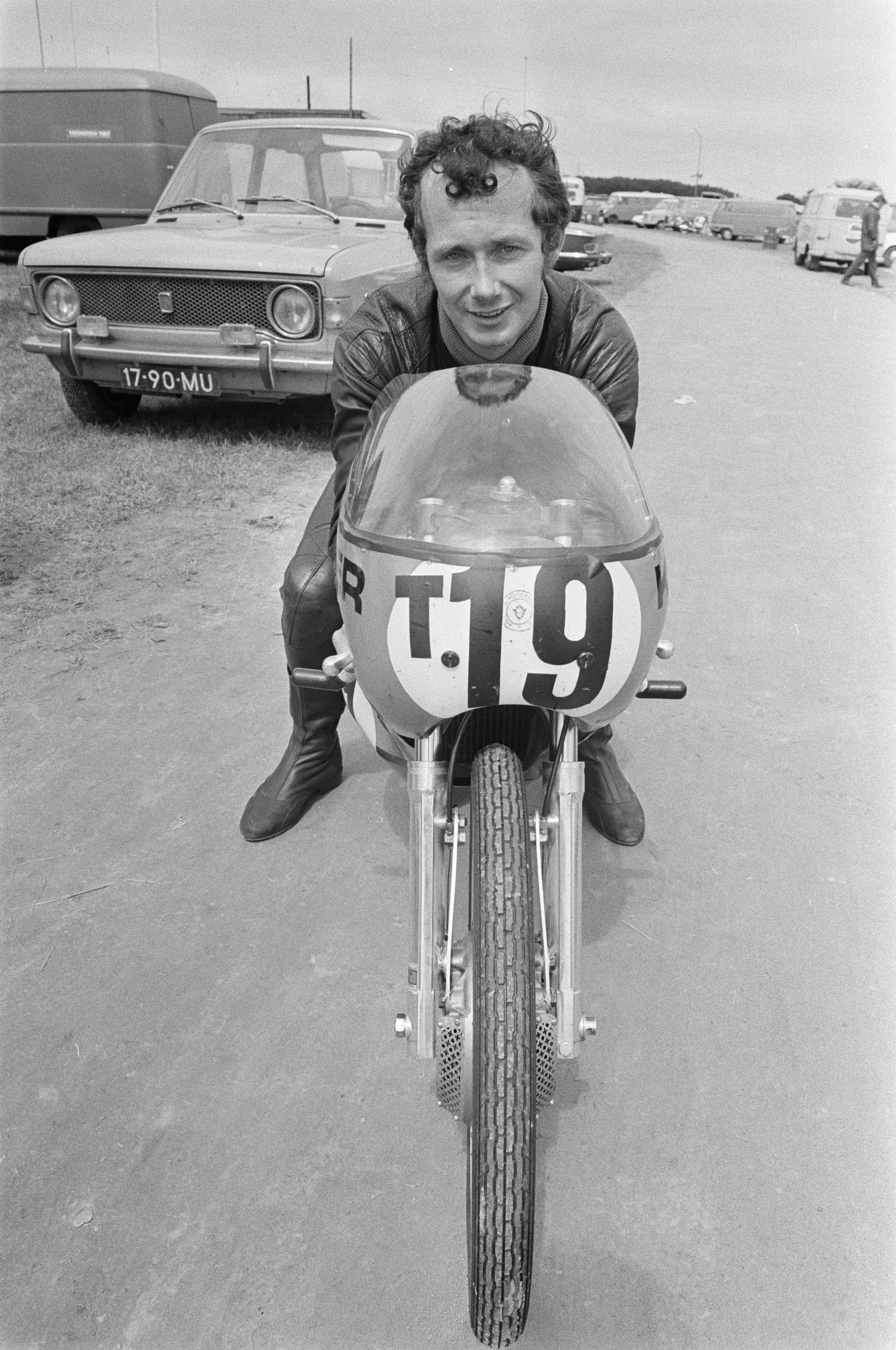
Jan de Vries on his 50cc racer 1971.

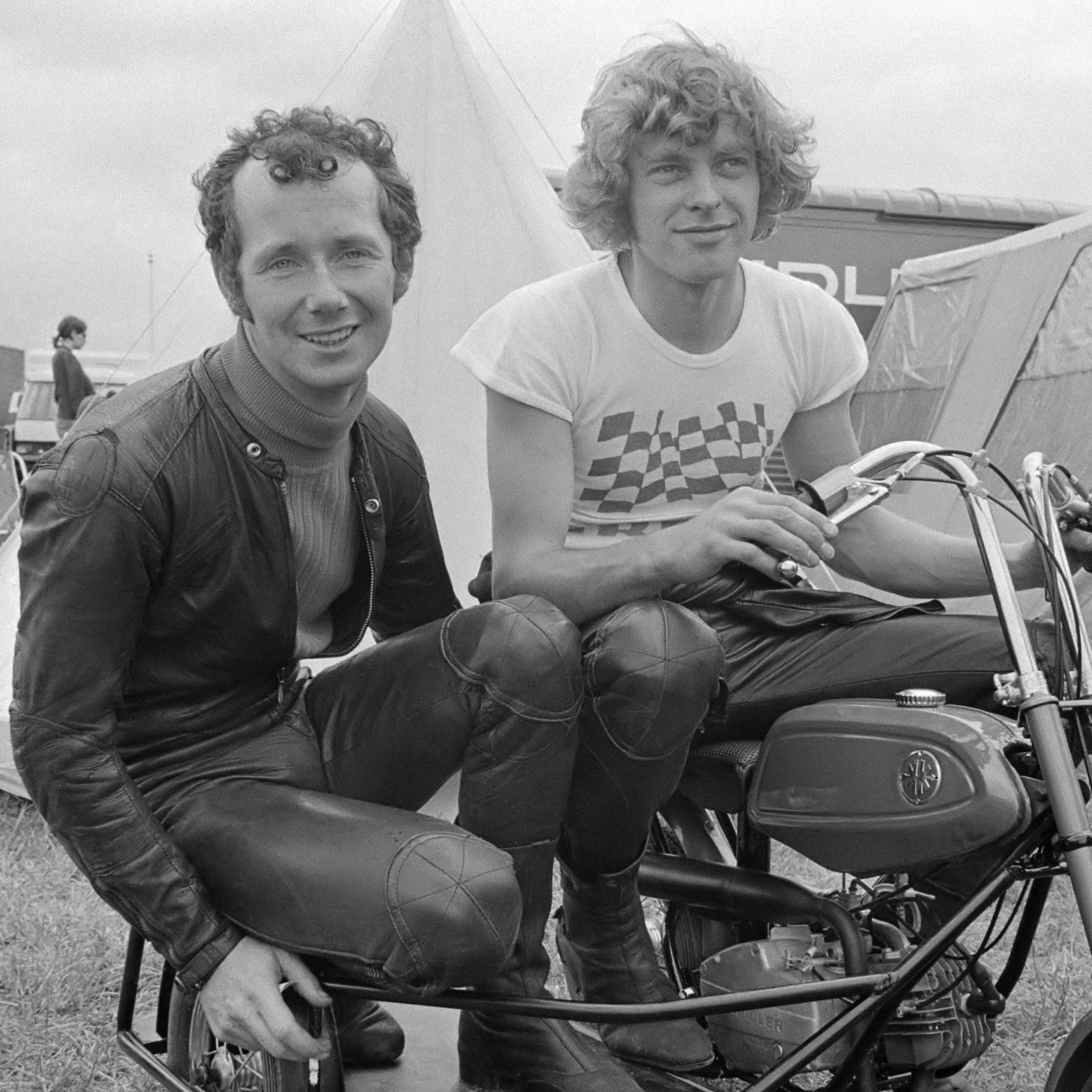
Jan de Vries and Jos Schurgers 1971.

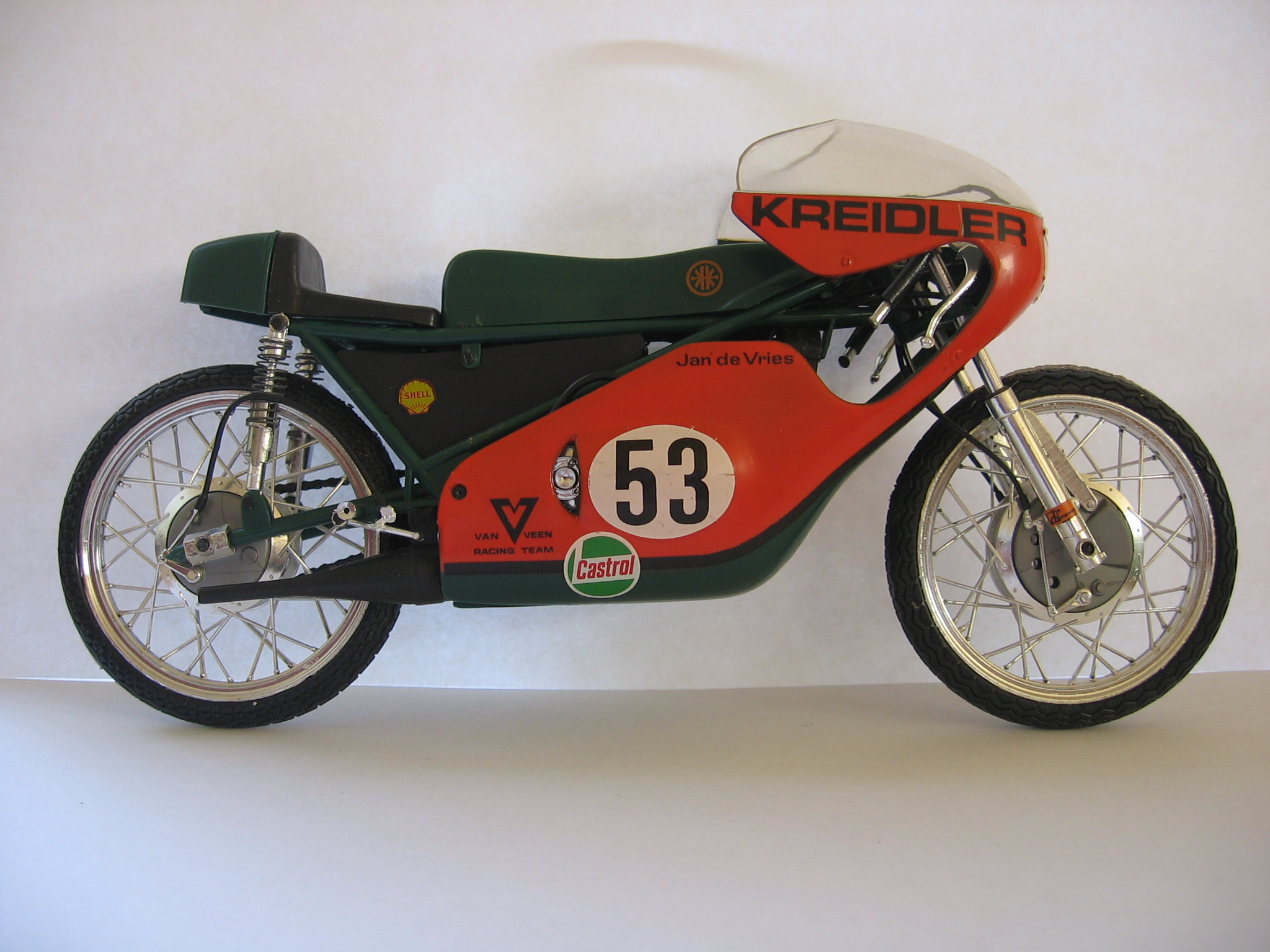
Kreidler 50cc racer.
