= Jos Schurgers =

Dutch motorcycle racer

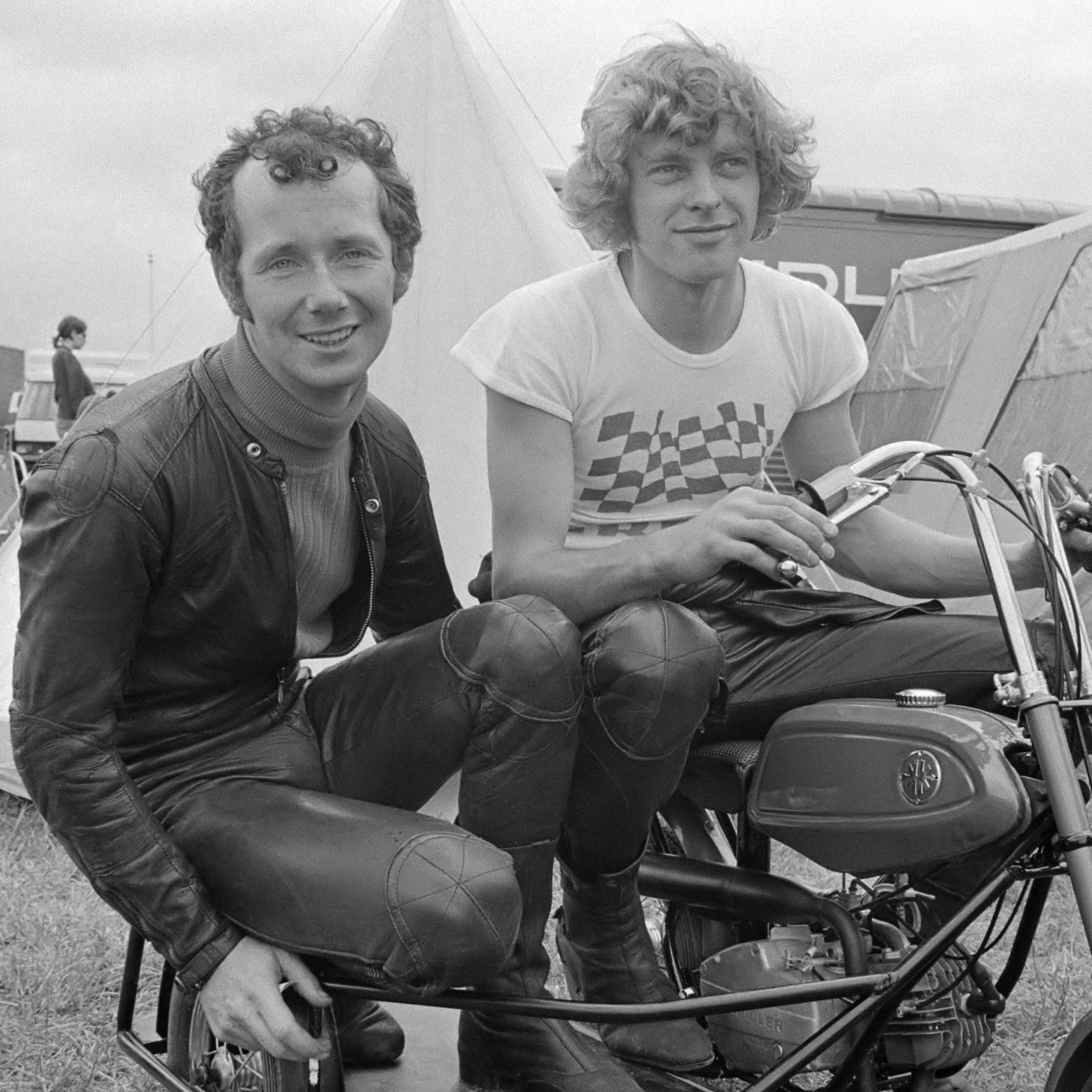
- Jan de Vries and Jos Schurgers 1971.
- Nationality: Dutch
Motorcycle racing career statistics
Grand Prix motorcycle racing
Active years	1968 - 1975
First race	1968 50cc Dutch TT
Last race	1975 125cc Dutch TT
First win	1973 125cc Belgian Grand Prix
Last win	1973 125cc Belgian Grand Prix
Team(s)	Kreidler, Bridgestone
Championships	0
Starts / Wins / Podiums / Poles / F. laps / Points; 25 / 1 / 11 / 0 / 0 / 195

Jos Schurgers (born 18 February 1947, Haarlem) is a former Grand Prix motorcycle road racer from the Netherlands. He had his best years in 1971 when he finished the 50cc season in third place behind Jan de Vries and Angel Nieto, and in 1973 when he won the 125cc race in the Belgian Grand Prix and finished the 125cc season again in third place, this time to Kent Andersson and Chas Mortimer.
