= Adu Celso =

Brazilian motorcycle racer

Adu Celso-Santos
- Nationality: (Brazil) Brazilian
Motorcycle racing career statistics
Grand Prix motorcycle racing
Active years	1972 - 1975
First race	1972 350cc French Grand Prix
Last race	1975 500cc West German Grand Prix
First win	1973 350cc Spanish Grand Prix
Last win	1973 350cc Spanish Grand Prix
Starts / Wins / Podiums / Poles / F. laps / Points; 15 / 1 / 3 / 0 / 0 / 137

Adu Celso-Santos (born Eduardo Celso Santos, 7 August 1945 - 6 February 2005) was a Brazilian professional motorcycle road racer. He was the first Brazilian to compete in Grand Prix motorcycle racing.

Celso-Santos was popular on the Grand Prix circuit during first half of the 1970s. He raced from 1972 to the 1975 season before returning to Brazil.

In the 1973 Grand Prix season, Celso-Santos gained his only victory in a race counting for world championship points when he won the 350cc class at the Spanish Grand Prix held at the Jarama Circuit.

== Motorcycle Grand Prix results ==
Points system from 1969 onwards:

**Position**	1	2	3	4	5	6	7	8	9	10
**Points**	15	12	10	8	6	5	4	3	2	1

(key) (Races in bold indicate pole position; races in italics indicate fastest lap)

Year	Class	Team	1	2	3	4	5	6	7	8	9	10	11	12	Points	Rank	Wins
1972	350cc	Yamaha	GER -	FRA; 7	AUT -	NAT -	IOM -	YUG -	NED; 4	DDR -	CZE -	SWE -	FIN -	ESP; 4	12	14th	0
1973	250cc	Yamaha	FRA -	AUT -	GER; 4		IOM -	YUG; 6	NED; 6	BEL -	CZE -	SWE; 3	FIN -	ESP -	20	12th	0
1973	350cc	Yamaha	FRA; 10	AUT -	GER -	NAT -	IOM -	YUG; 5	NED; 7		CZE; 10	SWE; 5	FIN -	ESP; 1	33	7th	1
1974	350cc	Yamaha	FRA -	GER -	AUT -	NAT; 9	IOM -	NED -	SWE -	FIN -	YUG -	ESP -			2	45th	0
1975	350cc	Yamaha	FRA -	ESP; 9	AUT; 3	GER -	NAT -	IOM -	NED -	BEL -	SWE -	FIN -	CZE -	YUG -	12	18th	0
1975	500cc	Yamaha	FRA -	ESP -	AUT -	GER; 9	NAT -	IOM -	NED -	BEL -	SWE -	FIN -	CZE -	YUG -	2	41st	0
