= Kim Newcombe =

New Zealand motorcycle racer

- Nationality: New Zealander
- Born: 2 January 1944; Nelson, New Zealand
- Died: 14 August 1973 (aged 29); Oxford, Oxfordshire, England
Motorcycle racing career statistics
Grand Prix motorcycle racing
Active years	1972 – 1973
First race	1972 500cc West German Grand Prix
Last race	1973 500cc Finnish Grand Prix
First win	1973 500cc Yugoslavian Grand Prix
Last win	1973 500cc Yugoslavian Grand Prix
Team	König
Starts / Wins / Podiums / Poles / F. laps / Points; 11 / 1 / 6 / 0 / 1 / 90

Kim Newcombe (2 January 1944 – 14 August 1973), was a Grand Prix motorcycle road racer from New Zealand.

== Biography ==
Born in Nelson, Newcombe grew up in Auckland, then moved to Australia (first Brisbane, then Melbourne) in 1963, and subsequently moved to Europe in 1968. He competed in the 500cc Grand Prix World Championship finishing second to Phil Read in the 1973 season.

Along with fellow racer, John Dodds, Newcombe developed a motorcycle using a two-stroke outboard motor designed by Dieter König. He and the König were the first to challenge the dominance of the MV Agustas after the departure of Honda from Grand Prix competition at the end of the 1967 season. In contrast to his main competitors, Newcombe was credited with the distinction of developing, building, maintaining, and riding the König machine in competition.

On 11 August 1973, Newcombe was seriously injured at a non-championship event at Silverstone at Stowe Corner. The day before the race Newcombe did his usual walk around to familiarize himself with the track. He noticed that one particular corner, Stowe, had a dip in the surface right before a sharp turn facing a wall of wooden beams. Concerned for rider safety he approached Vernon Cooper, clerk of the course, about placing hay bales in front of the wall. Cooper was incensed. He angrily rebuffed Newcombe and threatened him with expulsion from the series if he had the audacity to complain again.

The next day, 11 August, Newcombe led the race for six laps before hitting the dip at Stowe, running wide off the track, and striking the wall. Unconscious, he was treated on site before being transferred to a local hospital. Later in the day Cooper suggested maybe they should put some bales in front of the wall at Stowe after all.

Newcombe never regained consciousness and was declared brain dead on 14 August. Janeen gave permission for him to be taken off life support and his organs donated. He was 29 years old, and he posthumously took second place in the 1973 500cc Grand Prix, beating Agostini and finishing behind Phil Read.

Newcombe was survived by his wife Janeen who was supporting him on tour, and their son Mark (aged four at the time).

Newcombe's story was the subject of the award-winning 2006 documentary Love, Speed and Loss directed by Justin Pemberton.

== Grand Prix motorcycle racing results ==
**Position**	1	2	3	4	5	6	7	8	9	10
**Points**	15	12	10	8	6	5	4	3	2	1

(key) (Races in bold indicate pole position; races in italics indicate fastest lap)

Year	Class	Team	1	2	3	4	5	6	7	8	9	10	11	12	13	Points	Rank	Wins
1972	500cc	König	GER; 3	FRA; 10	AUT -	NAT -	IOM -	YUG -	NED -	BEL -	DDR; 3	CZE -	SWE; 5	FIN -	ESP -	27	10th	0
1973	500cc	König	FRA; 5	AUT; 3	GER -	IOM -	YUG; 1	NED; 2	BEL; 4	CZE -	SWE; 3	FIN; 4	ESP -			63	**2nd**	1
