= Yamaha TA125 =

Yamaha TA 125
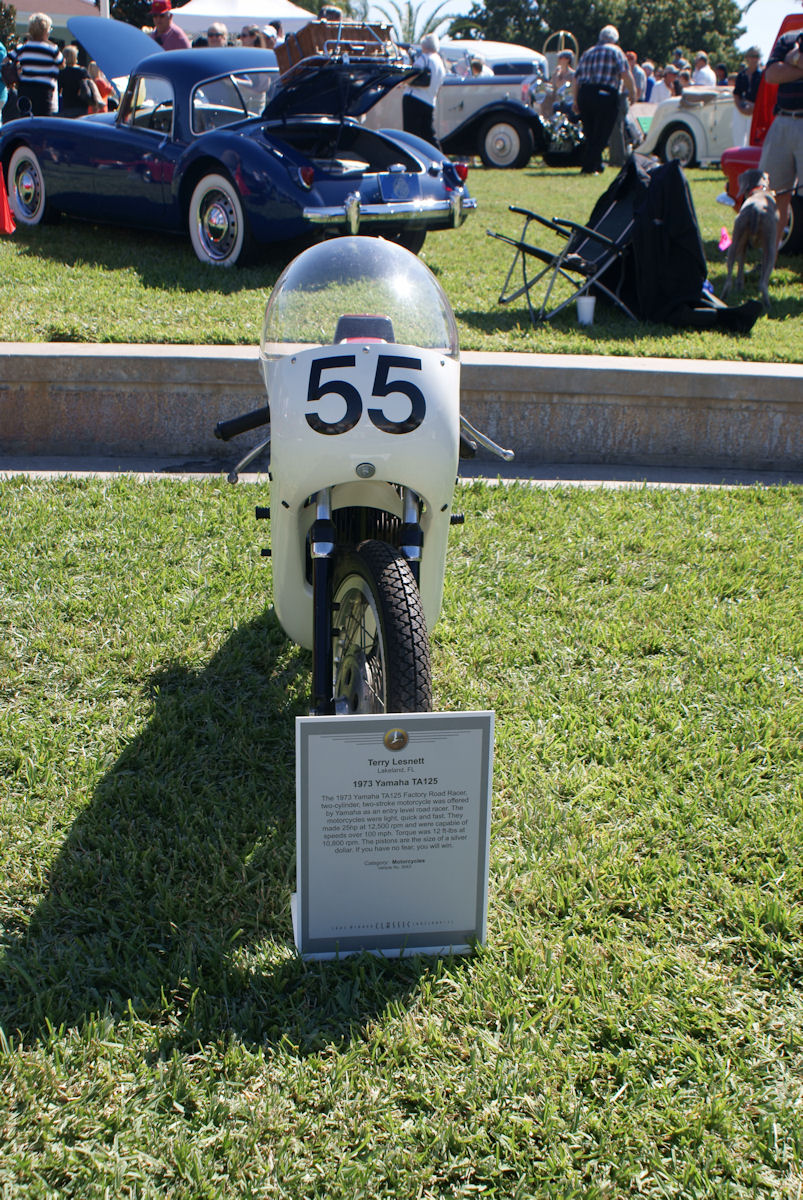
- Manufacturer: Yamaha
- Production: 1973-1975
- Class: Grand Prix motorcycle racing
- Engine: 124 cc, 2-cylinder, 2-stroke
- Power: 24 bhp (18 kW) @ 12,750 rpm
- Transmission: 5-speed
- Suspension: Twin-shock
- Brakes: Drum brakes
- Tires: 18"
- Dimensions: L: 1,790 mm (70 in); W: 520 mm (20 in)
- Weight: 81 kg (179 lb) (dry)
- Fuel capacity: 13.6 L (830 cu in)

The Yamaha TA 125 was a production racing motorcycle produced by the Yamaha Motor Company from 1973 to 1975. The motorcycle was powered by a two stroke 125 cc engine, and was Yamaha's first 125cc production racer.

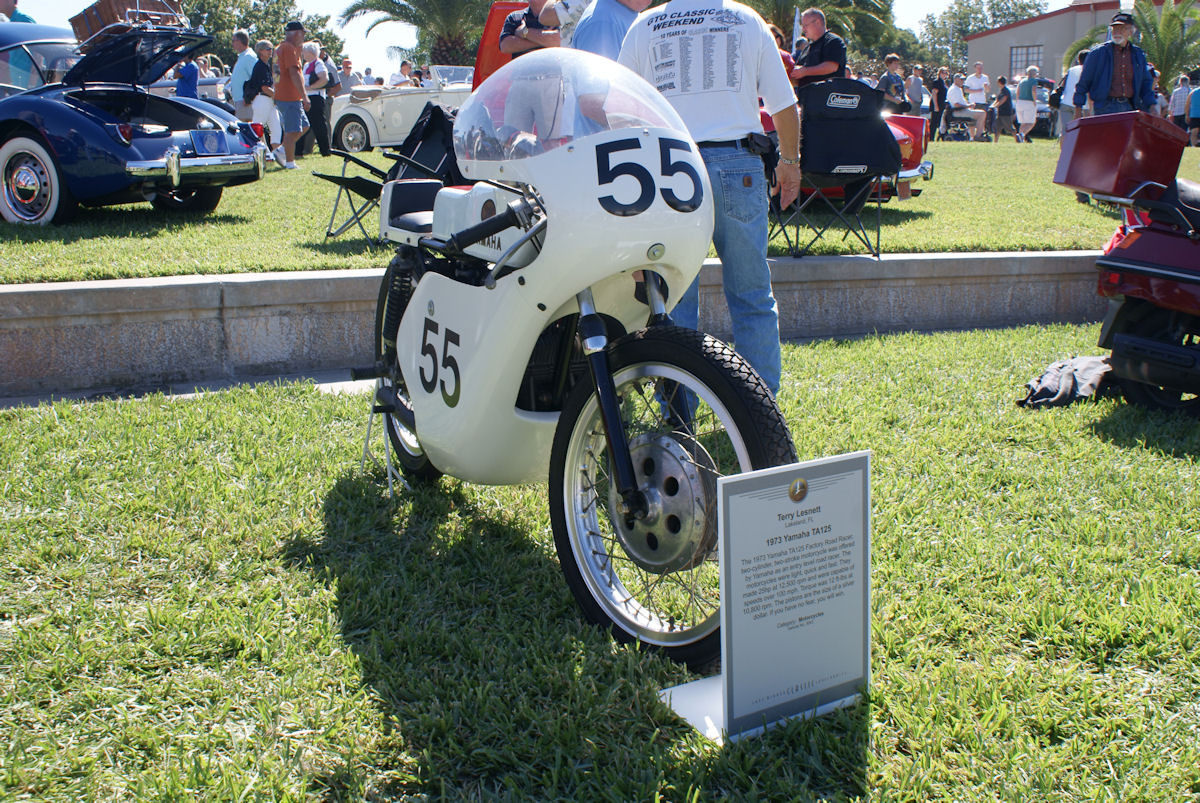
1973 Yamaha TA 125 front

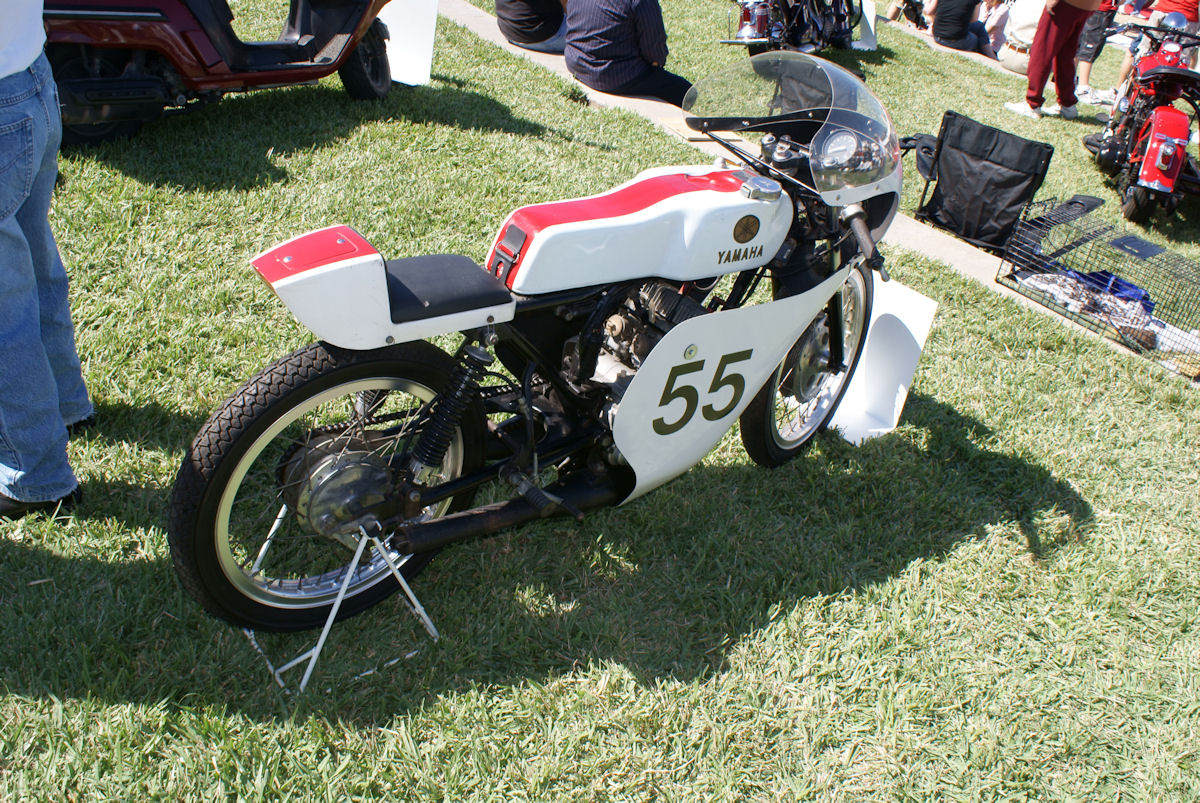
1973 Yamaha TA 125 rear
