= Spanish motorcycle Grand Prix =

Motorcycle race held in Spain

Spanish Grand Prix

Grand Prix motorcycle racing
- Venue: Circuito de Jerez – Ángel Nieto (1987, 1989–present); Circuito del Jarama (1969, 1971, 1973, 1975, 1977–1986, 1988); Montjuïc Circuit (1951–1955, 1961–1968, 1970, 1972, 1974, 1976)
- First race: 1950
- Most wins (rider): Ángel Nieto (11)
- Most wins (manufacturer): Honda (50)

The Spanish motorcycle Grand Prix is a motorcycling event that is part of the FIM Grand Prix motorcycle racing season that takes place at Circuito de Jerez – Ángel Nieto outside Jerez de la Frontera in Andalusia. In addition to this event, three other World Championship motorcycling events take place in Spain as of the 2026 season: the Catalan motorcycle Grand Prix, the Aragon motorcycle Grand Prix and the Valencian Community motorcycle Grand Prix, in the autonomous communities of Catalonia, Aragon and Valencia respectively.

== Official names and sponsors ==
- 1950–1951, 1954–1955, 1972–1981, 1985–1986, 1990–1991, 1994: Gran Premio de España (no official sponsor)
- 1982: Gran Premio Banco Atlántico
- 1983: Marlboro Gran Premio de España de Motociclismo
- 1984, 1987: Marlboro Gran Premio de España
- 1988: Gran Premio Marlboro de España
- 1989: Marlboro Gran Premio de España de Motociclismo
- 1992: Gran Premio Ducados de España
- 1993: Gran Premio de España Ducados
- 1995: Gran Premio de España MX Onda
- 1996–1997: Gran Premio Lucky Strike de España
- 1998–2005: Gran Premio Marlboro de España
- 2006: Gran Premio betandwin.com de España
- 2007–2009: Gran Premio bwin.com de España
- 2010–2015: Gran Premio bwin de España
- 2016–2022: Gran Premio Red Bull de España
- 2023: Gran Premio MotoGP Guru by Gryfyn de España
- 2024: Gran Premio Estrella Galicia 0,0 de España
- 2025–present: Estrella Galicia 0,0 Grand Prix of Spain

== Formerly used circuits and layouts ==
Original layout of Jerez, used in 1987, 1989–1991

Jarama, used in 1969, 1971, 1973, 1975, 1977–1986, 1988

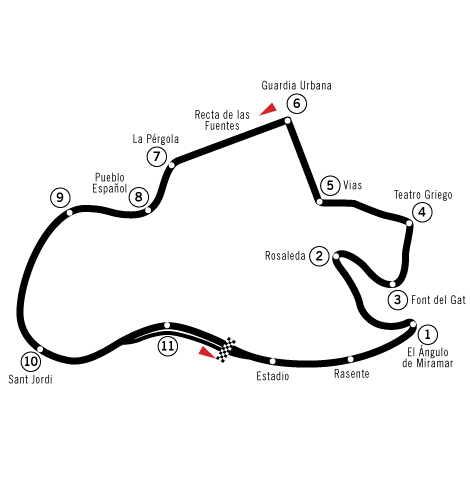
Montjuich, used in 1953–1955, 1961–1968, 1970, 1972, 1974, 1976

== Winners ==
=== Multiple winners (riders) ===
# Wins	Rider	Wins	
# Wins	Rider	Category	Years won
11	(Spain) Ángel Nieto	125cc	1970, 1971, 1979, 1981, 1982, 1983, 1984
11	(Spain) Ángel Nieto	50cc	1972, 1975, 1976, 1977
9	(Italy) Valentino Rossi	MotoGP	2002, 2003, 2005, 2007, 2009, 2016
9	(Italy) Valentino Rossi	500cc	2001
9	(Italy) Valentino Rossi	250cc	1999
9	(Italy) Valentino Rossi	125cc	1997
5	(West Germany) Hans-Georg Anscheidt	50cc	1962, 1963, 1964, 1967, 1968
5	(Italy) Eugenio Lazzarini	125cc	1978
5	(Italy) Eugenio Lazzarini	50cc	1978, 1979, 1980, 1983
5	(Italy) Pier Paolo Bianchi	125cc	1976, 1977, 1980, 1985
5	(Italy) Pier Paolo Bianchi	80cc	1984
5	(Spain) Jorge Martínez	125cc	1988, 1990
5	(Spain) Jorge Martínez	80cc	1985, 1986, 1987
5	(Spain) Jorge Lorenzo	MotoGP	2010, 2011, 2015
5	(Spain) Jorge Lorenzo	250cc	2006, 2007
4	(Switzerland) Luigi Taveri	125cc	1955, 1963, 1964
4	(Switzerland) Luigi Taveri	50cc	1966
4	(United Kingdom) Phil Read	500cc	1973
4	(United Kingdom) Phil Read	250cc	1965, 1967, 1968
4	(Italy) Giacomo Agostini	500cc	1968, 1969
4	(Italy) Giacomo Agostini	350cc	1969, 1975
4	(South Africa) Kork Ballington	350cc	1976, 1979
4	(South Africa) Kork Ballington	250cc	1979, 1980
4	(Australia) Mick Doohan	500cc	1991, 1992, 1994, 1996
4	(Spain) Àlex Crivillé	500cc	1997, 1998, 1999
4	(Spain) Àlex Crivillé	125cc	1989
4	(Spain) Dani Pedrosa	MotoGP	2008, 2013, 2017
4	(Spain) Dani Pedrosa	250cc	2005
3	(Italy) Tarquinio Provini	250cc	1963, 1964
3	(Italy) Tarquinio Provini	125cc	1954
3	(United States) Kenny Roberts	500cc	1979, 1980, 1982
3	(Venezuela) Carlos Lavado	250cc	1982, 1985, 1986
3	(Australia) Wayne Gardner	500cc	1986, 1987, 1990
3	(Japan) Kazuto Sakata	125cc	1993, 1994, 1998
3	(Germany) Ralf Waldmann	250cc	1997, 2000
3	(Germany) Ralf Waldmann	125cc	1992
3	(Spain) Marc Márquez	MotoGP	2014, 2018, 2019
3	(Italy) Francesco Bagnaia	MotoGP	2022, 2023, 2024
3	(Spain) Álex Márquez	MotoGP	2025, 2026
3	(Spain) Álex Márquez	Moto2	2017
2	(United Kingdom) Fergus Anderson	500cc	1953
2	(United Kingdom) Fergus Anderson	350cc	1954
2	(New Zealand) Hugh Anderson	125cc	1965
2	(New Zealand) Hugh Anderson	50cc	1965
2	(United Kingdom) Bill Ivy	125cc	1966, 1967
2	(Spain) Salvador Cañellas	125cc	1968
2	(Spain) Salvador Cañellas	50cc	1970
2	(Italy) Angelo Bergamonti	500cc	1970
2	(Italy) Angelo Bergamonti	350cc	1970
2	(Sweden) Kent Andersson	250cc	1970
2	(Sweden) Kent Andersson	125cc	1972
2	(United Kingdom) Chas Mortimer	500cc	1972
2	(United Kingdom) Chas Mortimer	125cc	1973
2	(Netherlands) Jan de Vries	50cc	1971, 1973
2	(Australia) John Dodds	250cc	1973, 1974
2	(United States) Freddie Spencer	500cc	1983, 1985
2	(Italy) Fausto Gresini	125cc	1986, 1987
2	(Switzerland) Stefan Dörflinger	80cc	1982, 1988
2	(Spain) Sito Pons	250cc	1984, 1988
2	(United States) Eddie Lawson	500cc	1984, 1989
2	(Japan) Tetsuya Harada	250cc	1993, 1995
2	(Japan) Haruchika Aoki	125cc	1995, 1996
2	(Japan) Masao Azuma	125cc	1999, 2001
2	(Italy) Lucio Cecchinello	125cc	2002, 2003
2	(Italy) Marco Simoncelli	125cc	2004, 2005
2	(Italy) Loris Capirossi	MotoGP	2006
2	(Italy) Loris Capirossi	250cc	1998
2	(Spain) Toni Elías	Moto2	2010
2	(Spain) Toni Elías	250cc	2003
2	(Spain) Pol Espargaró	Moto2	2012
2	(Spain) Pol Espargaró	125cc	2010
2	(Finland) Mika Kallio	Moto2	2014
2	(Finland) Mika Kallio	250cc	2008
2	(Italy) Romano Fenati	Moto3	2012, 2014
2	(Italy) Lorenzo Baldassarri	Moto2	2018, 2019
2	(United Kingdom) Sam Lowes	Moto2	2016, 2023

=== Multiple winners (manufacturers) ===
# Wins	Manufacturer	Wins	
# Wins	Manufacturer	Category	Years won
50	(Japan) Honda	MotoGP	2002, 2003, 2004, 2008, 2012, 2013, 2014, 2017, 2018, 2019
50	(Japan) Honda	500cc	1983, 1985, 1986, 1987, 1989, 1990, 1991, 1992, 1994, 1995, 1996, 1997, 1998, 1999, 2001
50	(Japan) Honda	250cc	1962, 1966, 1988, 1991, 1997, 2001, 2004, 2005, 2009
50	(Japan) Honda	Moto3	2015, 2017, 2019
50	(Japan) Honda	125cc	1961, 1962, 1963, 1964, 1991, 1992, 1993, 1995, 1996, 1999, 2000, 2001
50	(Japan) Honda	50cc	1966
41	(Japan) Yamaha	MotoGP	2005, 2007, 2009, 2010, 2011, 2015, 2016, 2020
41	(Japan) Yamaha	500cc	1972, 1979, 1980, 1982, 1984, 1988
41	(Japan) Yamaha	350cc	1971, 1972, 1973, 1974, 1975, 1976, 1977
41	(Japan) Yamaha	250cc	1965, 1967, 1968, 1970, 1971, 1973, 1974, 1977, 1982, 1985, 1986, 1987, 1989, 1990, 1993, 1995
41	(Japan) Yamaha	125cc	1966, 1967, 1972, 1973
22	(Italy) Aprilia	250cc	1992, 1994, 1996, 1998, 1999, 2000, 2002, 2003, 2006, 2007
22	(Italy) Aprilia	125cc	1994, 1997, 1998, 2002, 2003, 2004, 2005, 2006, 2007, 2008, 2009, 2011
14	(Germany) Kalex	Moto2	2012, 2013, 2014, 2015, 2016, 2017, 2018, 2019, 2020, 2021, 2022, 2023, 2025, 2026
11	(Italy) MV Agusta	500cc	1952, 1954, 1968, 1969, 1970, 1973
11	(Italy) MV Agusta	350cc	1969, 1970
11	(Italy) MV Agusta	250cc	1961
11	(Italy) MV Agusta	125cc	1953, 1955
10	(Austria) KTM	250cc	2008
10	(Austria) KTM	Moto3	2013, 2014, 2016, 2018, 2020, 2021, 2023, 2025, 2026
10	(Spain) Derbi	125cc	1970, 1971, 1974, 1988, 2010
10	(Spain) Derbi	80cc	1985, 1986, 1987
10	(Spain) Derbi	50cc	1970, 1972
10	(West Germany) Kreidler	50cc	1962, 1963, 1964, 1969, 1971, 1973, 1975, 1978, 1979, 1982
8	(Japan) Suzuki	500cc	1978, 1993, 2000
8	(Japan) Suzuki	125cc	1965, 1969
8	(Japan) Suzuki	50cc	1965, 1967, 1968
7	(Japan) Kawasaki	500cc	1971
7	(Japan) Kawasaki	350cc	1979
7	(Japan) Kawasaki	250cc	1978, 1979, 1980, 1981, 1983
7	(Italy) Ducati	MotoGP	2006, 2021, 2022, 2023, 2024, 2025, 2026
6	(Italy) Morbidelli	125cc	1975, 1976, 1977, 1978, 1980, 1986
6	(Italy) Garelli	125cc	1982, 1983, 1984, 1986, 1987
6	(Italy) Garelli	50cc	1983
4	(Spain) Bultaco	125cc	1968
4	(Spain) Bultaco	50cc	1976, 1977, 1981
3	(Italy) Moto Guzzi	500cc	1953
3	(Italy) Moto Guzzi	350cc	1954
3	(Italy) Moto Guzzi	250cc	1953
3	(Spain) JJ Cobas	250cc	1984
3	(Spain) JJ Cobas	125cc	1989, 1990
2	(Italy) Mondial	125cc	1951, 1954
2	(Italy) Gilera	500cc	1951, 1955
2	(Italy) Morini	250cc	1963
2	(Italy) Morini	125cc	1952
2	(United States) Harley-Davidson	250cc	1975, 1976
2	(Italy) Minarelli	125cc	1979, 1981
2	(West Germany) Krauser	80cc	1988, 1989

=== By year ===
A pink background indicates an event that was not part of the Grand Prix motorcycle racing championship.

Year	Track	Moto3		Moto2		MotoGP		Report
Year	Track	Rider	Manufacturer	Rider	Manufacturer	Rider	Manufacturer	Report
2026	Jerez	(Spain) Máximo Quiles	KTM	(Australia) Senna Agius	Kalex	(Spain) Álex Márquez	Ducati	Report
2025	Jerez	(Spain) José Antonio Rueda	KTM	(Spain) Manuel González	Kalex	(Spain) Álex Márquez	Ducati	Report
2024	Jerez	(Netherlands) Collin Veijer	Husqvarna	(Spain) Fermín Aldeguer	Boscoscuro	(Italy) Francesco Bagnaia	Ducati	Report
2023	Jerez	(Spain) Iván Ortolá	KTM	(United Kingdom) Sam Lowes	Kalex	(Italy) Francesco Bagnaia	Ducati	Report

Year	Track	MotoE				Moto3		Moto2		MotoGP		Report
Year	Track	Race 1		Race 2		Moto3		Moto2		MotoGP		Report
Year	Track	Rider	Manufacturer	Rider	Manufacturer	Rider	Manufacturer	Rider	Manufacturer	Rider	Manufacturer	Report
2022	Jerez	(Brazil) Eric Granado	Energica	(Brazil) Eric Granado	Energica	(Spain) Izan Guevara	GasGas	(Japan) Ai Ogura	Kalex	(Italy) Francesco Bagnaia	Ducati	Report
2021	Jerez	(Italy) Alessandro Zaccone	Energica	—N/a		(Spain) Pedro Acosta	KTM	(Italy) Fabio Di Giannantonio	Kalex	(Australia) Jack Miller	Ducati	Report
2020	Jerez	(Brazil) Eric Granado	Energica	—N/a		(Spain) Albert Arenas	KTM	(Italy) Luca Marini	Kalex	(France) Fabio Quartararo	Yamaha	Report

Year	Track	Moto3		Moto2		MotoGP		Report
Year	Track	Rider	Manufacturer	Rider	Manufacturer	Rider	Manufacturer	Report
2019	Jerez	(Italy) Niccolò Antonelli	Honda	(Italy) Lorenzo Baldassarri	Kalex	(Spain) Marc Márquez	Honda	Report
2018	Jerez	(Germany) Philipp Öttl	KTM	(Italy) Lorenzo Baldassarri	Kalex	(Spain) Marc Márquez	Honda	Report
2017	Jerez	(Spain) Arón Canet	Honda	(Spain) Álex Márquez	Kalex	(Spain) Dani Pedrosa	Honda	Report
2016	Jerez	(South Africa) Brad Binder	KTM	(United Kingdom) Sam Lowes	Kalex	(Italy) Valentino Rossi	Yamaha	Report
2015	Jerez	(United Kingdom) Danny Kent	Honda	(Germany) Jonas Folger	Kalex	(Spain) Jorge Lorenzo	Yamaha	Report
2014	Jerez	(Italy) Romano Fenati	KTM	(Finland) Mika Kallio	Kalex	(Spain) Marc Márquez	Honda	Report
2013	Jerez	(Spain) Maverick Viñales	KTM	(Spain) Esteve Rabat	Kalex	(Spain) Dani Pedrosa	Honda	Report
2012	Jerez	(Italy) Romano Fenati	FTR Honda	(Spain) Pol Espargaró	Kalex	(Australia) Casey Stoner	Honda	Report
Year	Track	125cc		Moto2		MotoGP		Report
Year	Track	Rider	Manufacturer	Rider	Manufacturer	Rider	Manufacturer	Report
2011	Jerez	(Spain) Nicolás Terol	Aprilia	(Italy) Andrea Iannone	Suter	(Spain) Jorge Lorenzo	Yamaha	Report
2010	Jerez	(Spain) Pol Espargaró	Derbi	(Spain) Toni Elías	Moriwaki	(Spain) Jorge Lorenzo	Yamaha	Report
Year	Track	125cc		250cc		MotoGP		Report
Year	Track	Rider	Manufacturer	Rider	Manufacturer	Rider	Manufacturer	Report
2009	Jerez	(United Kingdom) Bradley Smith	Aprilia	(Japan) Hiroshi Aoyama	Honda	(Italy) Valentino Rossi	Yamaha	Report
2008	Jerez	(Italy) Simone Corsi	Aprilia	(Finland) Mika Kallio	KTM	(Spain) Dani Pedrosa	Honda	Report
2007	Jerez	(Hungary) Gábor Talmácsi	Aprilia	(Spain) Jorge Lorenzo	Aprilia	(Italy) Valentino Rossi	Yamaha	Report
2006	Jerez	(Spain) Álvaro Bautista	Aprilia	(Spain) Jorge Lorenzo	Aprilia	(Italy) Loris Capirossi	Ducati	Report
2005	Jerez	(Italy) Marco Simoncelli	Aprilia	(Spain) Daniel Pedrosa	Honda	(Italy) Valentino Rossi	Yamaha	Report
2004	Jerez	(Italy) Marco Simoncelli	Aprilia	(Italy) Roberto Rolfo	Honda	(Spain) Sete Gibernau	Honda	Report
2003	Jerez	(Italy) Lucio Cecchinello	Aprilia	(Spain) Toni Elías	Aprilia	(Italy) Valentino Rossi	Honda	Report
2002	Jerez	(Italy) Lucio Cecchinello	Aprilia	(Spain) Fonsi Nieto	Aprilia	(Italy) Valentino Rossi	Honda	Report
Year	Track	125cc		250cc		500cc		Report
Year	Track	Rider	Manufacturer	Rider	Manufacturer	Rider	Manufacturer	Report
2001	Jerez	(Japan) Masao Azuma	Honda	(Japan) Daijiro Kato	Honda	(Italy) Valentino Rossi	Honda	Report
2000	Jerez	(Spain) Emilio Alzamora	Honda	(Germany) Ralf Waldmann	Aprilia	(United States) Kenny Roberts Jr.	Suzuki	Report
1999	Jerez	(Japan) Masao Azuma	Honda	(Italy) Valentino Rossi	Aprilia	(Spain) Àlex Crivillé	Honda	Report
1998	Jerez	(Japan) Kazuto Sakata	Aprilia	(Italy) Loris Capirossi	Aprilia	(Spain) Àlex Crivillé	Honda	Report
1997	Jerez	(Italy) Valentino Rossi	Aprilia	(Germany) Ralf Waldmann	Honda	(Spain) Àlex Crivillé	Honda	Report
1996	Jerez	(Japan) Haruchika Aoki	Honda	(Italy) Max Biaggi	Aprilia	(Australia) Mick Doohan	Honda	Report
1995	Jerez	(Japan) Haruchika Aoki	Honda	(Japan) Tetsuya Harada	Yamaha	(Spain) Alberto Puig	Honda	Report
1994	Jerez	(Japan) Kazuto Sakata	Aprilia	(France) Jean-Philippe Ruggia	Aprilia	(Australia) Mick Doohan	Honda	Report
1993	Jerez	(Japan) Kazuto Sakata	Honda	(Japan) Tetsuya Harada	Yamaha	(United States) Kevin Schwantz	Suzuki	Report
1992	Jerez	(Germany) Ralf Waldmann	Honda	(Italy) Loris Reggiani	Aprilia	(Australia) Mick Doohan	Honda	Report
1991	Jerez	(Japan) Noboru Ueda	Honda	(Germany) Helmut Bradl	Honda	(Australia) Mick Doohan	Honda	Report
1990	Jerez	(Spain) Jorge Martínez	JJ Cobas	(United States) John Kocinski	Yamaha	(Australia) Wayne Gardner	Honda	Report

Year	Track	80cc		125cc		250cc		500cc		Report
Year	Track	Rider	Manufacturer	Rider	Manufacturer	Rider	Manufacturer	Rider	Manufacturer	Report
1989	Jerez	(Spain) Herri Torrontegui	Krauser	(Spain) Àlex Crivillé	JJ Cobas	(Italy) Luca Cadalora	Yamaha	(United States) Eddie Lawson	Honda	Report
1988	Jarama	(Switzerland) Stefan Dörflinger	Krauser	(Spain) Jorge Martínez	Derbi	(Spain) Sito Pons	Honda	(Australia) Kevin Magee	Yamaha	Report
1987	Jerez	(Spain) Jorge Martínez	Derbi	(Italy) Fausto Gresini	Garelli	(West Germany) Martin Wimmer	Yamaha	(Australia) Wayne Gardner	Honda	Report
1986	Jarama	(Spain) Jorge Martínez	Derbi	(Italy) Fausto Gresini	Garelli	(Venezuela) Carlos Lavado	Yamaha	(Australia) Wayne Gardner	Honda	Report
1985	Jarama	(Spain) Jorge Martínez	Derbi	(Italy) Pier Paolo Bianchi	Morbidelli	(Venezuela) Carlos Lavado	Yamaha	(United States) Freddie Spencer	Honda	Report
1984	Jarama	(Italy) Pier Paolo Bianchi	Huvo-Casal	(Spain) Ángel Nieto	Garelli	(Spain) Sito Pons	JJ Cobas	(United States) Eddie Lawson	Yamaha	Report
Year	Track	50cc		125cc		250cc		500cc		Report
Year	Track	Rider	Manufacturer	Rider	Manufacturer	Rider	Manufacturer	Rider	Manufacturer	Report
1983	Jarama	(Italy) Eugenio Lazzarini	Garelli	(Spain) Ángel Nieto	Garelli	(France) Hervé Guilleux	Kawasaki	(United States) Freddie Spencer	Honda	Report

Year	Track	50cc		125cc		250cc		350cc		500cc		Report
Year	Track	Rider	Manufacturer	Rider	Manufacturer	Rider	Manufacturer	Rider	Manufacturer	Rider	Manufacturer	Report
1982	Jarama	(Switzerland) Stefan Dörflinger	Kreidler	(Spain) Ángel Nieto	Garelli	(Venezuela) Carlos Lavado	Yamaha			(United States) Kenny Roberts	Yamaha	Report
1981	Jarama	(Spain) Ricardo Tormo	Bultaco	(Spain) Ángel Nieto	Minarelli	(West Germany) Anton Mang	Kawasaki					Report
1980	Jarama	(Italy) Eugenio Lazzarini	Iprem	(Italy) Pier Paolo Bianchi	Morbidelli	(South Africa) Kork Ballington	Kawasaki			(United States) Kenny Roberts	Yamaha	Report
1979	Jarama	(Italy) Eugenio Lazzarini	Kreidler	(Spain) Ángel Nieto	Minarelli	(South Africa) Kork Ballington	Kawasaki	(South Africa) Kork Ballington	Kawasaki	(United States) Kenny Roberts	Yamaha	Report
1978	Jarama	(Italy) Eugenio Lazzarini	Kreidler	(Italy) Eugenio Lazzarini	Morbidelli	(Australia) Gregg Hansford	Kawasaki			(United States) Pat Hennen	Suzuki	Report
1977	Jarama	(Spain) Ángel Nieto	Bultaco	(Italy) Pier Paolo Bianchi	Morbidelli	(Japan) Takazumi Katayama	Yamaha	(France) Michel Rougerie	Yamaha			Report
1976	Montjuich	(Spain) Ángel Nieto	Bultaco	(Italy) Pier Paolo Bianchi	Morbidelli	(Italy) Gianfranco Bonera	Harley-Davidson	(South Africa) Kork Ballington	Yamaha			Report
1975	Jarama	(Spain) Ángel Nieto	Kreidler	(Italy) Paolo Pileri	Morbidelli	(Italy) Walter Villa	Harley-Davidson	(Italy) Giacomo Agostini	Yamaha			Report
1974	Montjuich	(Netherlands) Henk van Kessel	Van Veen Kreidler	(Spain) Benjamin Grau	Derbi	(Australia) John Dodds	Yamaha	(Spain) Víctor Palomo	Yamaha			Report
1973	Jarama	(Netherlands) Jan de Vries	Kreidler	(United Kingdom) Chas Mortimer	Yamaha	(Australia) John Dodds	Yamaha	(Brazil) Adu Celso-Santos	Yamaha	(United Kingdom) Phil Read	MV Agusta	Report
1972	Montjuich	(Spain) Ángel Nieto	Derbi	(Sweden) Kent Andersson	Yamaha	(Italy) Renzo Pasolini	Aermacchi	(Switzerland) Bruno Kneubühler	Yamaha	(United Kingdom) Chas Mortimer	Yamaha	Report
1971	Jarama	(Netherlands) Jan de Vries	Kreidler	(Spain) Ángel Nieto	Derbi	(Finland) Jarno Saarinen	Yamaha	(Finland) Teuvo Länsivuori	Yamaha	(United Kingdom) Dave Simmonds	Kawasaki	Report
1970	Montjuich	(Spain) Salvador Cañellas	Derbi	(Spain) Ángel Nieto	Derbi	(Sweden) Kent Andersson	Yamaha	(Italy) Angelo Bergamonti	MV Agusta	(Italy) Angelo Bergamonti	MV Agusta	Report
1969	Jarama	(Netherlands) Aalt Toersen	Kreidler	(Netherlands) Cees van Dongen	Suzuki	(Spain) Santiago Herrero	Ossa	(Italy) Giacomo Agostini	MV Agusta	(Italy) Giacomo Agostini	MV Agusta	Report
1968	Montjuich	(West Germany) Hans-Georg Anscheidt	Suzuki	(Spain) Salvador Cañellas	Bultaco	(United Kingdom) Phil Read	Yamaha			(Italy) Giacomo Agostini	MV Agusta	Report
1967	Montjuich	(West Germany) Hans-Georg Anscheidt	Suzuki	(United Kingdom) Bill Ivy	Yamaha	(United Kingdom) Phil Read	Yamaha					Report
1966	Montjuich	(Switzerland) Luigi Taveri	Honda	(United Kingdom) Bill Ivy	Yamaha	(United Kingdom) Mike Hailwood	Honda					Report
1965	Montjuich	(New Zealand) Hugh Anderson	Suzuki	(New Zealand) Hugh Anderson	Suzuki	(United Kingdom) Phil Read	Yamaha					Report
1964	Montjuich	(West Germany) Hans-Georg Anscheidt	Kreidler	(Switzerland) Luigi Taveri	Honda	(Italy) Tarquinio Provini	Benelli					Report
1963	Montjuich	(West Germany) Hans-Georg Anscheidt	Kreidler	(Switzerland) Luigi Taveri	Honda	(Italy) Tarquinio Provini	Morini					Report
1962	Montjuich	(West Germany) Hans-Georg Anscheidt	Kreidler	(Japan) Kunimitsu Takahashi	Honda	(Federation of Rhodesia and Nyasaland) Jim Redman	Honda					Report
Year	Track			125cc		250cc		350cc		500cc		Report
Year	Track			Rider	Manufacturer	Rider	Manufacturer	Rider	Manufacturer	Rider	Manufacturer	Report
1961	Montjuich			(Australia) Tom Phillis	Honda	(Federation of Rhodesia and Nyasaland) Gary Hocking	MV Agusta					Report
1955	Montjuich			(Switzerland) Luigi Taveri	MV Agusta					(Republic of Ireland) Reg Armstrong	Gilera	Report
1954	Montjuich			(Italy) Tarquinio Provini	Mondial			(United Kingdom) Fergus Anderson	Moto Guzzi	(United Kingdom) Dickie Dale	MV Agusta	Report
1953	Montjuich			(Italy) Angelo Copeta	MV Agusta	(Italy) Enrico Lorenzetti	Moto Guzzi			(United Kingdom) Fergus Anderson	Moto Guzzi	Report
1952	Montjuich			(Italy) Emilio Mendogni	Morini					(United Kingdom) Leslie Graham	MV Agusta	Report
1951	Montjuich			(Italy) Guido Leoni	Mondial			(United Kingdom) Tommy Wood	Velocette	(Italy) Umberto Masetti	Gilera	Report
1950	Montjuich			(Italy) Nello Pagani				(United Kingdom) Tommy Wood		(Italy) Nello Pagani		Report
