= Suzuki TR500 =

- Manufacturer: Suzuki
- Production: 1969–1973
- Successor: Suzuki RG 500
- Engine: 493 cc (30.1 cu in) two-stroke air-cooled parallel-twin
- Bore / stroke: 70 mm × 64 mm (2.8 in × 2.5 in)
- Top speed: 237–253 km/h (147–157 mph)
- Power: 63.5–73 hp (47.4–54.4 kW; 64.4–74.0 PS)
- Transmission: 5-speed, chain final drive
- Weight: 135 kg (298 lb) (dry)

Suzuki TR500 was a Japanese road racing motorcycle manufactured by Suzuki which first edition was seen in 1968 with Frank Perris as rider, and then competed in the 500cc class of Grand Prix motorcycle racing from 1969 to 1973.
