= List of Grand Prix motorcycle racers: L =

Name	Seasons	World Championships	MotoGP Wins	500cc Wins	350cc Wins	Moto2 Wins	250cc Wins	Moto3 Wins	125cc Wins	80cc Wins	50cc Wins	MotoE Wins
(Netherlands) Gijs Lagervey	1950	0	0	0	0	0	0	0	0	0	0	0
(Italy) Fabrizio Lai	2001-2008	0	0	0	0	0	0	0	0	0	0	0
(Finland) Teuvo Länsivuori	1969-1978	0	0	1	5	0	2	0	0	0	0	0
(Venezuela) Carlos Lavado	1978-1992	2 250cc - 1983, 1986	0	0	2	0	17	0	0	0	0	0
(United States) Eddie Lawson	1983-1992	4 500cc - 1984, 1986, 1988-1989	0	31	0	0	0	0	0	0	0	0
(Republic of Ireland) Eddie Laycock	1988-1992	0	0	0	0	0	0	0	0	0	0	0
(Italy) Eugenio Lazzarini	1969-1984	3 50cc - 1979-1980 125cc - 1978	0	0	0	0	0	0	9	0	18	0
(Spain) Iker Lecuona	2016-2021, 2023	0	0	0	0	0	0	0	0	0	0	0
(Italy) Gianni Leoni	1949-1951	0	0	0	0	0	0	0	3	0	0	0
(Italy) Guido Leoni	1949, 1951	0	0	0	0	0	0	0	1	0	0	0
(Italy) Libero Liberati	1952-1953, 1955-1957, 1959	1 500cc - 1957	0	4	2	0	0	0	0	0	0	0
(United Kingdom) Dan Linfoot	2005-2007	0	0	0	0	0	0	0	0	0	0	0
(Netherlands) Joey Litjens	2005-2008	0	0	0	0	0	0	0	0	0	0	0
(Italy) Roberto Locatelli	1994-2009	1 125cc - 2000	0	0	0	0	0	0	9	0	0	0
(United Kingdom) Johnny Lockett	1949-1951	0	0	0	0	0	0	0	0	0	0	0
(United Kingdom) Bill Lomas	1950-1952, 1954-1956	2 350cc - 1955-1956	0	1	7	0	1	0	0	0	0	0
(Italy) Dino Lombardi	2006-2008	0	0	0	0	0	0	0	0	0	0	0
(Spain) Alonso López	2018-	0	0	0	0	4	0	0	0	0	0	0
(Italy) Enrico Lorenzetti	1949-1957	1 250cc - 1952	0	0	2	0	5	0	0	0	0	0
(Spain) Jorge Lorenzo	2002-2019	5 250cc - 2006-2007 MotoGP - 2010, 2012, 2015	47	0	0	0	17	0	4	0	0	0
(United Kingdom) Sam Lowes	2014-2023	0	0	0	0	10	0	0	0	0	0	0
(Italy) Marco Lucchinelli	1975-1986	1 500cc - 1981	0	6	0	0	0	0	0	0	0	0
(Italy) Luca Lunetta	2022-	0	0	0	0	0	0	0	0	0	0	0
(Switzerland) Thomas Lüthi	2002-2021	1 125cc - 2005	0	0	0	12	0	0	5	0	0	0
(Republic of Ireland) Ernie Lyons	1949	0	0	0	0	0	0	0	0	0	0	0
