= List of Grand Prix motorcycle racers: A =

Name	Seasons	World Championships	MotoGP Wins	500cc Wins	350cc Wins	Moto2 Wins	250cc Wins	Moto3 Wins	125cc Wins	80cc Wins	50cc Wins	MotoE Wins
(Japan) Norick Abe	1994-2004	0	0	3	0	0	0	0	0	0	0	0
(Germany) Hubert Abold	1984, 1986-1989	0	0	0	0	0	0	0	0	0	0	0
(Czech Republic) Karel Abraham	2005-2019	0	0	0	0	1	0	0	0	0	0	0
(Italy) Leonardo Abruzzo	2025	0	0	0	0	0	0	0	0	0	0	0
(Spain) Pedro Acosta	2021-	2 Moto3 - 2021; Moto2 - 2023	1	0	0	10	0	6	0	0	0	0
(United Kingdom) Brian Adams	1970	0	0	0	0	0	0	0	0	0	0	0
(Indonesia) Fadillah Arbi Aditama	2023-2025	0	0	0	0	0	0	0	0	0	0	0
(Switzerland) Dominique Aegerter	2006-2022	1 MotoE - 2022	0	0	0	1	0	0	0	0	0	5
(Denmark) Kenni Aggerholm	2006	0	0	0	0	0	0	0	0	0	0	0
(Australia) Senna Agius	2022-	0	0	0	0	4	0	0	0	0	0	0
(Italy) Duilio Agostini	1953-1955	0	0	0	1	0	0	0	0	0	0	0
(Italy) Felice Agostini	1975, 1978	0	0	0	0	0	0	0	0	0	0	0
(Italy) Giacomo Agostini	1964-1977	15; 500cc - 1966-1972, 1975; 350cc - 1968-1974	0	68	54	0	0	0	0	0	0	0
(India) KY Ahamed	2023	0	0	0	0	0	0	0	0	0	0	0
(Australia) Jack Ahearn	1954-1955, 1963-1966	0	0	1	0	0	0	0	0	0	0	0
(Indonesia) Mario Aji	2021-	0	0	0	0	0	0	0	0	0	0	0
(Finland) Niklas Ajo	2010-2015	0	0	0	0	0	0	0	0	0	0	0
(Japan) Mitsuo Akamatsu	1967	0	0	0	0	0	0	0	0	0	0	0
(Japan) Takashi Akita	1998	0	0	0	0	0	0	0	0	0	0	0
(Japan) Kousuke Akiyoshi	2006-2008, 2010-2011, 2015	0	0	0	0	0	0	0	0	0	0	0
(Italy) Raffaele Alberti	1950-1951	0	0	0	0	0	0	0	0	0	0	0
(Switzerland) Josef Albisser	1953	0	0	0	0	0	0	0	0	0	0	0
(Spain) Jeremy Alcoba	2018-2024	0	0	0	0	0	0	0	0	0	0	0
(Spain) Marc Alcoba	2022	0	0	0	0	0	0	0	0	0	0	0
(Spain) Fermin Aldeguer	2021-	0	1	0	0	8	0	0	0	0	0	0
(Italy) Pierluigi Aldrovandi	1982-1983	0	0	0	0	0	0	0	0	0	0	0
(Venezuela) Alejandro Aleman	1978	0	0	0	0	0	0	0	0	0	0	0
(Venezuela) Eduardo Aleman	1977-1978, 1982	0	0	0	0	0	0	0	0	0	0	0
(Spain) Jaime Alguersuari, Sr.	1973, 1975	0	0	0	0	0	0	0	0	0	0	0
(France) Julien Allemand	1998-2000	0	0	0	0	0	0	0	0	0	0	0
(United States) Dick Allen	1964	0	0	0	0	0	0	0	0	0	0	0
(South Africa) Rudy Allison	1954	0	0	0	0	0	0	0	0	0	0	0
(Spain) David Almansa	2022-	0	0	0	0	0	0	4	0	0	0	0
(Colombia) David Alonso	2021-	1 Moto3 - 2024	0	0	0	3	0	18	0	0	0	0
(Germany) Florian Alt	2013, 2015	0	0	0	0	0	0	0	0	0	0	0
(Spain) Pedro Alvarez	1968	0	0	0	0	0	0	0	0	0	0	0
(Spain) Luis Alvaro	1989, 1991	0	0	0	0	0	0	0	0	0	0	0
(Spain) Emilio Alzamora	1994-2003	1; 125cc - 1999	0	0	0	0	0	0	4	0	0	0
(Qatar) Nasser Al Malki	2011-2012, 2017	0	0	0	0	0	0	0	0	0	0	0
(Qatar) Mashel Al Naimi	2010-2011, 2014	0	0	0	0	0	0	0	0	0	0	0
(Qatar) Hamad Al-Sahouti	2024	0	0	0	0	0	0	0	0	0	0	0
(Qatar) Saeed Al Sulaiti	2017	0	0	0	0	0	0	0	0	0	0	0
(Japan) Kunihiro Amano	1994	0	0	0	0	0	0	0	0	0	0	0
(Germany) Luca Amato	2012-2013	0	0	0	0	0	0	0	0	0	0	0
(Spain) Daniel Amatriain	1988-1989	0	0	0	0	0	0	0	0	0	0	0
(Italy) Dario Ambrosini	1949-1951	1; 250cc - 1950	0	0	0	0	5	0	0	0	0	0
(Rhodesia) Ray Amm	1952-1954	0	0	3	4	0	0	0	0	0	0	0
(Italy) Luigi Ancona	1993, 1995-1996	0	0	0	0	0	0	0	0	0	0	0
(United Kingdom) Bob Anderson	1958-1960	0	0	0	0	0	0	0	0	0	0	0
(United Kingdom) Chris Anderson	1963, 1966	0	0	0	0	0	0	0	0	0	0	0
(United Kingdom) Fergus Anderson	1949-1951	2; 350cc - 1953, 1954	0	2	7	0	3	0	0	0	0	0
(New Zealand) Hugh Anderson	1960-1966	4; 125cc - 1963, 1965; 50cc - 1963-1964	0	0	0	0	0	0	16	0	8	0
(New Zealand) John Anderson	1958	0	0	0	0	0	0	0	0	0	0	0
(United Kingdom) Syl Anderton	1949-1952	0	0	0	0	0	0	0	0	0	0	0
(Sweden) Kent Andersson	1966, 1968-1975	2; 125cc - 1973-1974	0	0	0	0	4	0	14	0	0	0
(Italy) Alessandro Andreozzi	2011-2012	0	0	0	0	0	0	0	0	0	0	0
(Republic of Ireland) George Andrews	1950, 1957	0	0	0	0	0	0	0	0	0	0	0
(Italy) Luigi Anelli	1970, 1972	0	0	0	0	0	0	0	0	0	0	0
(San Marino) Alex de Angelis	1999-2015, 2017, 2019-2020	0	0	0	0	3	1	0	0	0	0	0
(San Marino) William de Angelis	1999-2001	0	0	0	0	0	0	0	0	0	0	0
(Netherlands) Marcel Ankone	1972-1973, 1975-1976	0	0	0	0	0	0	0	0	0	0	0
(West Germany) Hans-Georg Anscheidt	1962-1968	3; 50cc - 1966-1968	0	0	0	0	0	0	0	0	14	0
(Italy) Niccolò Antonelli	2012-2022	0	0	0	0	0	0	4	0	0	0	0
(Italy) Alessandro Antonello	1996	0	0	0	0	0	0	0	0	0	0	0
(Malaysia) Azroy Anuar	2022-2023	0	0	0	0	0	0	0	0	0	0	0
(Japan) Haruchika Aoki	1993-1999, 2001-2002	2; 125cc - 1995-1996	0	0	0	0	0	0	9	0	0	0
(Japan) Nobuatsu Aoki	1990-2000, 2002-2005, 2007-2008	0	0	0	0	0	1	0	0	0	0	0
(Japan) Takuma Aoki	1993-1995, 1997	0	0	0	0	0	0	0	0	0	0	0
(Japan) Hiroshi Aoyama	2000-2017	1; 250cc - 2009	0	0	0	0	9	0	0	0	0	0
(Japan) Shuhei Aoyama	2001-2002, 2004, 2006-2007, 2009	0	0	0	0	0	0	0	0	0	0	0
(Netherlands) Bram Appelo	2006	0	0	0	0	0	0	0	0	0	0	0
(France) Andre Luc Appietto	1969-1970, 1973	0	0	0	0	0	0	0	0	0	0	0
(United Kingdom) Robin Appleyard	1988-1990	0	0	0	0	0	0	0	0	0	0	0
(Japan) Junya Arai	1989	0	0	0	0	0	0	0	0	0	0	0
(Japan) Toshiyuki Arakaki	1991-1993, 1995-1996	0	0	0	0	0	0	0	0	0	0	0
(Spain) Fernando Aranda	1951	0	0	0	0	0	0	0	0	0	0	0
(Japan) Takeishi Araoka	1972	0	0	0	0	0	0	0	0	0	0	0
(Spain) Adrian Araujo	2000-2001	0	0	0	0	0	0	0	0	0	0	0
(Italy) Tony Arbolino	2017-	0	0	0	0	6	0	3	0	0	0	0
(United Kingdom) Jake Archer	2017-2018	0	0	0	0	0	0	0	0	0	0	0
(Switzerland) Gilbert Argo	1969	0	0	0	0	0	0	0	0	0	0	0
(Spain) Daniel Arcas	2008-2009	0	0	0	0	0	0	0	0	0	0	0
(France) Christophe Arciero	2013	0	0	0	0	0	0	0	0	0	0	0
(Spain) Albert Arenas	2014, 2016-2025	1 Moto3 - 2020	0	0	0	0	0	6	0	0	0	0
(Cuba) Manuel Arias	1975	0	0	0	0	0	0	0	0	0	0	0
(United Kingdom) Ken Armstrong	1970	0	0	0	0	0	0	0	0	0	0	0
(Republic of Ireland) Reg Armstrong	1949-1956	0	0	4	1	0	2	0	0	0	0	0
(Italy) Arciso Artesiani	1949-1951	0	0	0	0	0	0	0	0	0	0	0
(Spain) Xavier Artigas	2019, 2021-2024	0	0	0	0	0	0	1	0	0	0	0
(Italy) Sandro Artusi	1956	0	0	0	0	0	0	0	0	0	0	0
(Spain) Javier Arumi	1988-1989	0	0	0	0	0	0	0	0	0	0	0
(Japan) Sadao Asami	1978-1981	0	0	0	0	0	0	0	0	0	0	0
(Italy) Giuseppe Ascareggi	1980-1985, 1987-1989	0	0	0	0	0	0	0	0	0	0	0
(Germany) Franz Aschenbrenner	2005-2006	0	0	0	0	0	0	0	0	0	0	0
(United Kingdom) Stuart Aspin	1969	0	0	0	0	0	0	0	0	0	0	0
(Thailand) Nakarin Atiratphuvapat	2017-2018, 2025	0	0	0	0	0	0	0	0	0	0	0
(Australia) Len Atlee	1966	0	0	0	0	0	0	0	0	0	0	0
(France) Pierre Audry	1975-1976	0	0	0	0	0	0	0	0	0	0	0
(Austria) Karl Auer	1969-1972, 1974-1977	0	0	0	0	0	0	0	0	0	0	0
(Austria) August Auinger	1978-1989	0	0	0	0	0	0	0	5	0	0	0
(France) Jean Auréal	1969-1970	0	0	0	0	0	0	0	1	0	0	0
(Austria) Josef Autengruber	1958	0	0	0	0	0	0	0	0	0	0	0
(New Zealand) Stu Avant	1976, 1981-1982	0	0	0	0	0	0	0	0	0	0	0
(United Kingdom) Rex Avery	1961-1962, 1964-1965, 1967	0	0	0	0	0	0	0	0	0	0	0
(Malaysia) Helmi Azman	2023-2024	0	0	0	0	0	0	0	0	0	0	0
(Malaysia) Syarifuddin Azman	2021-2023	0	0	0	0	0	0	0	0	0	0	0
(Malaysia) Hafiq Azmi	2013-2014, 2016	0	0	0	0	0	0	0	0	0	0	0
(Japan) Masao Azuma	1996-2003	0	0	0	0	0	0	0	10	0	0	0
