= List of Grand Prix motorcycle racers: H =

Name	Seasons	World Championships	MotoGP Wins	500cc Wins	350cc Wins	Moto2 Wins	250cc Wins	Moto3 Wins	125cc Wins	80cc Wins	50cc Wins	MotoE Wins
(Germany) Werner Haas	1952-1954	3; 250cc - 1953,1954; 125cc - 1953	0	0	0	0	7	0	4	0	0	0
(Socialist Federal Republic of Yugoslavia) Silvo Habat	1985, 1987-1988	0	0	0	0	0	0	0	0	0	0	0
(Algeria) Larbi Habbiche	1973	0	0	0	0	0	0	0	0	0	0	0
(United Kingdom) Ron Hackett	1972	0	0	0	0	0	0	0	0	0	0	0
(Japan) Taiga Hada	2021-2023, 2025	0	0	0	0	0	0	0	0	0	0	0
(Germany) Gerhard Haeberle	1988	0	0	0	0	0	0	0	0	0	0	0
(Switzerland) Bernard Haenggeli	1987-1995	0	0	0	0	0	0	0	0	0	0	0
(Germany) Philipp Hafeneger	1999,2001	0	0	0	0	0	0	0	0	0	0	0
(Japan) Kensuke Haga	1996-1997	0	0	0	0	0	0	0	0	0	0	0
(Japan) Noriyuki Haga	1998, 2001, 2003	0	0	0	0	0	0	0	0	0	0	0
(Germany) Josef Hage	1978-1982	0	0	0	0	0	0	0	0	0	0	0
(Germany) Andreas Hahn	2000-2001	0	0	0	0	0	0	0	0	0	0	0
(Germany) Richard Haidegger	2001	0	0	0	0	0	0	0	0	0	0	0
(United Kingdom) Mike Hailwood	1958-1967	9; 500cc - 1962-1965; 350cc - 1966-1967; 250cc - 1961, 1966-1967	0	37	16	0	21	0	2	0	0	0
(United States) Mike Hale	1999	0	0	0	0	0	0	0	0	0	0	0
(Czech Republic) Karel Hanika	2014-2017	0	0	0	0	0	0	0	0	0	0	0
(Australia) Ross Hannan	1969	0	0	0	0	0	0	0	0	0	0	0
(Sweden) Osmo Hansen	1969	0	0	0	0	0	0	0	0	0	0	0
(Australia) Gregg Hansford	1978-1981	0	0	0	6	0	4	0	0	0	0	0
(Germany) Kevin Hanus	2010-2015	0	0	0	0	0	0	0	0	0	0	0
(Japan) Tetsuya Harada	1990-2002	1; 250cc - 1993	0	0	0	0	17	0	0	0	0	0
(United Kingdom) John Hartle	1955-1960, 1963-1964, 1967-1968	0	0	3	1	0	1	0	0	0	0	0
(Netherlands) Wil Hartog	1973, 1975-1981	0	0	5	0	0	0	0	0	0	0	0
(Japan) Sho Hasegawa	2019	0	0	0	0	0	0	0	0	0	0	0
(United Kingdom) Gary Haslam	2000	0	0	0	0	0	0	0	0	0	0	0
(United Kingdom) Leon Haslam	1998-2002	0	0	0	0	0	0	0	0	0	0	0
(United Kingdom) Ron Haslam	1982-1993	0	0	0	0	0	0	0	0	0	0	0
(Norway) Bjorn Hasli	1975	0	0	0	0	0	0	0	0	0	0	0
(Japan) Yasumasa Hatakeyama	1996-2000	0	0	0	0	0	0	0	0	0	0	0
(United Kingdom) Mike Hawthorne	1967-1972	0	0	0	0	0	0	0	0	0	0	0
(United States) Nicky Hayden	2003-2008	1 MotoGP - 2006	3	0	0	0	0	0	0	0	0	0
(United Kingdom) James Haydon	1992-1996, 2004	0	0	0	0	0	0	0	0	0	0	0
(United Kingdom) Luke Hedger	2015	0	0	0	0	0	0	0	0	0	0	0
(Germany) Dirk Heidolf	1997-2007	0	0	0	0	0	0	0	0	0	0	0
(Germany) Franz Heller	1977-1978	0	0	0	0	0	0	0	0	0	0	0
(New Zealand) John Hempleman	1955-1960	0	0	0	0	0	0	0	0	0	0	0
(United States) Pat Hennen	1976-1978	0	0	3	0	0	0	0	0	0	0	0
(Spain) Manuel Hernández	2004-2008	0	0	0	0	0	0	0	0	0	0	0
(Colombia) Yonny Hernandez	2010-2017, 2021	0	0	0	0	0	0	0	0	0	0	0
(Spain) María Herrera	2013-2025	0	0	0	0	0	0	0	0	0	0	0
(Spain) Santiago Herrero	1968-1970	0	0	0	0	0	4	0	0	0	0	0
(Spain) Manuel Herreros	1984-1991	1; 80cc - 1989	0	0	0	0	0	0	0	2	0	0
(United States) Josh Herrin	2014	0	0	0	0	0	0	0	0	0	0	0
(United Kingdom) Tom Herron	1971, 1973-1979	0	0	1	0	0	1	0	0	0	0	0
(United Kingdom) Wilfred Herron	1974-1979	0	0	0	0	0	0	0	0	0	0	0
(Germany) Manfred Herweh	1980-1989	0	0	0	1	0	5	0	0	0	0	0
(Japan) Sanadori Hikita	1992, 1995	0	0	0	0	0	0	0	0	0	0	0
(Germany) Ernst Hiller	1956-1958, 1971, 1970-1973	0	0	0	0	0	0	0	0	0	0	0
(Australia) Eric Hinton	1957-1969	0	0	0	0	0	0	0	0	0	0	0
(Australia) Harry Hinton	1949-1951	0	0	0	0	0	0	0	0	0	0	0
(Japan) Osamu Hiwatashi	1986-1991	0	0	0	0	0	0	0	0	0	0	0
(Federation of Rhodesia and Nyasaland) Gary Hocking	1958-1962	2; 500cc - 1961; 350cc - 1961	0	8	6	0	5	0	0	0	0	0
(Germany) Alex Hofmann	1997-2007	0	0	0	0	0	0	0	0	0	0	0
(Switzerland) Andreas Hofmann	1981-1983	0	0	0	0	0	0	0	0	0	0	0
(United Kingdom) Neil Hodgson	1992-1995, 2004	0	0	0	0	0	0	0	0	0	0	0
(Germany) Hernan Holder	1987-1988	0	0	0	0	0	0	0	0	0	0	0
(Spain) Daniel Holgado	2021-	0	0	0	0	4	0	4	0	0	0	0
(Belgium) Francis Hollebecq	1975	0	0	0	0	0	0	0	0	0	0	0
(Japan) Toshihiko Honma	1988-1995, 1999	0	0	0	0	0	0	0	0	0	0	0
(Australia) Joshua Hook	2010-2011, 2015, 2019-2020	0	0	0	0	0	0	0	0	0	0	0
(United States) John Hopkins	2002-2008, 2011	0	0	0	0	0	0	0	0	0	0	0
(Germany) Karl Hoppe	1959, 1961, 1967-1970	0	0	0	0	0	0	0	0	0	0	0
(United Kingdom) David Horton	1989-1991, 1998	0	0	0	0	0	0	0	0	0	0	0
(Romania) Jacopo Hosciuc	2025	0	0	0	0	0	0	0	0	0	0	0
(Germany) Alois Huber	1959	0	0	0	0	0	0	0	0	0	0	0
(Germany) Klaus Huber	1958, 1969-1972	0	0	0	0	0	0	0	0	0	0	0
(South Africa) Brett Hudson	1984	0	0	0	0	0	0	0	0	0	0	0
(Spain) Adrián Huertas	2025-	0	0	0	0	0	0	0	0	0	0	0
(United Kingdom) Keith Huewen	1979-1985	0	0	0	0	0	0	0	0	0	0	0
(Czech Republic) Jaroslav Huleš	1993-2003	0	0	0	0	0	0	0	0	0	0	0
(Finland) Eero Hyvärinen	1975-1986	0	0	0	0	0	0	0	0	0	0	0
