= Harry Hinton (motorcyclist) =

Australian motorcycle racer

- Nationality: (Australia) Australian
Motorcycle racing career statistics
Grand Prix motorcycle racing
Active years	1949 - 1951
First race	1949 Isle of Man 350cc Junior TT
Last race	1951 Isle of Man 350cc Junior TT
Championships	0
Starts / Wins / Podiums / Poles / F. laps / Points; 8 / 0 / 1 / N/A / N/A / 5

Harry Hinton (1909–1978) was an Australian former Grand Prix motorcycle road racer. He was born 31 JUL 1909 Birmingham. His best season was in 1950 when he finished ninth in the 500cc world championship. Hinton was the first Australian to score points in the premier 500cc division. After being injured in a crash at the 1951 Isle of Man Junior TT, Hinton left the European racing circuit, but continued to race in his native Australia. He died in 1978, at the age of 67.

== Motorcycle Grand Prix results ==
1949 point system

Position	1	2	3	4	5	Fastest lap
Points	10	8	7	6	5	1

Points system from 1950 to 1968

Position	1	2	3	4	5	6
Points	8	6	4	3	2	1

5 best results were counted up until 1955.

(key) (Races in italics indicate fastest lap)

Year	Class	Team	1	2	3	4	5	6	7	8	Points	Rank	Wins
1949	350cc	Norton	IOM; 15	SUI -	NED; 10	BEL -	ULS; 7				0	-	0
1949	500cc	Norton	IOM; 9	SUI -	NED; 8	BEL -	ULS -	NAT -			0	-	0
1950	350cc	Norton	IOM; 10	BEL; 11	NED; 6	SUI; 7	ULS; 3	NAT; 3			9	6th	0
1950	500cc	Norton	IOM; 10	BEL; 6	NED; 3	SUI -	ULS -	NAT -			5	9th	0
1951	350cc	Norton	ESP -	SUI -	IOM; NC	BEL -	NED -	FRA -	ULS -	NAT -	0	-	0
