= Nello Pagani =

Italian motorcycle racer and racing driver (1911–2003)

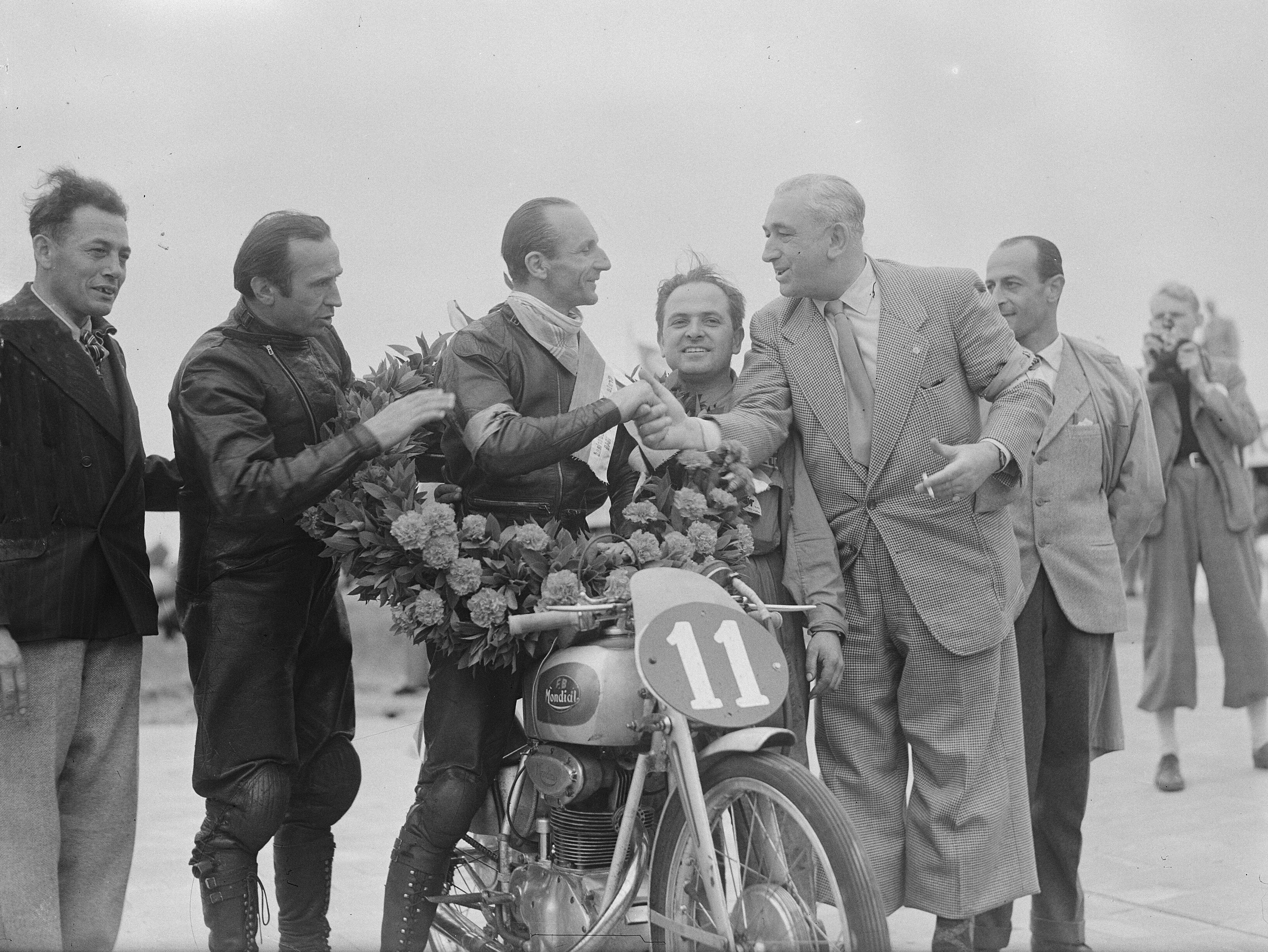
- Pagani at the 1949 Dutch TT
- Nationality: (Italy) Italian
- Born: 11 October 1911; Milan, Italy
- Died: 19 October 2003 (aged 92); Bresso, Lombardy, Italy
Motorcycle racing career statistics
Grand Prix motorcycle racing
Active years	1949 – 1955
First race	1949 125cc Swiss Grand Prix
Last race	1955 500cc Spanish Grand Prix
First win	1949 125cc Swiss Grand Prix
Last win	1949 500cc Nations Grand Prix
Team(s)	Gilera, Mondial, MV Agusta
Championships	1949 - 125cc
Starts / Wins / Podiums / Poles / F. laps / Points; 22 / 4 / 11 / N/A / 4 / 93

Nello Pagani
Formula One World Championship career
- Active years: 1950
- Team: Scuderia Achille Varzi (Maserati)
- Entries: 1
- Championships: 0
- Wins: 0
- Podiums: 0
- Career points: 0
- Pole positions: 0
- Fastest laps: 0
- First entry: 1950 Swiss Grand Prix

Cirillo Pagani (11 October 1911 – 19 October 2003), nicknamed "Nello", was an Italian Grand Prix motorcycle road racer and Formula One driver. He was born in Milan, Lombardy, and died in Bresso.

Pagani was known for his long career, spanning from 1928 to 1955, and for becoming the first 125cc World Champion in the inaugural 1949 campaign. He almost became a double Champion in that first year of the World Championship series. In the 500cc class, he was officially runner-up. The series was run over six rounds with a rider's best three scores counting towards the championship. Englishman Les Graham on an AJS was Pagani's main rival. Although Pagani scored more overall points than Graham, he lost the championship with two wins and a third place as his scores that counted, whilst Graham had two wins and a second.

Pagani's car racing exploits resulted in wins at the Pau Grand Prix in 1947 and 1948, before his single Formula One World Championship Grand Prix, on 4 June 1950, in the 1950 Swiss Grand Prix at Bremgarten. He finished seventh and scored no championship points. He also finished fourth in the Modena Grand Prix that year, driving a Simca-Gordini.

In 1952, Pagani finished second in class in the Mille Miglia, driving an OSCA but was more involved with motorcycle racing and became the manager of the MV Agusta team.

Pagani was the father of Alberto Pagani, who was also a racing motorcyclist.

== Motorcycle Grand Prix results ==
1949 point system:

Position	1	2	3	4	5	Fastest lap
Points	10	8	7	6	5	1

Points system from 1950 to 1968:

Position	1	2	3	4	5	6
Points	8	6	4	3	2	1

5 best results were counted up until 1955.

(key) (Races in italics indicate fastest lap)

Year	Class	Team	1	2	3	4	5	6	7	8	9	Points	Rank	Wins
1949	125cc	Mondial		SUI; 1	NED; 1			NAT; 5				27	1st	2
1949	500cc	Gilera	IOM	SUI; 4	NED; 1	BEL; 5	ULS; 3	NAT; 1				29	2nd	2
1950	500cc	Gilera	IOM	BEL; 2	NED; 2	SUI	ULS	NAT				12	4th	0
1951	125cc	Mondial	ESP		IOM; 4		NED		ULS	NAT		3	10th	0
1951	500cc	Gilera	ESP	SUI	IOM	BEL; 5	NED	FRA; 3	ULS	NAT; 3		10	5th	0
1952	500cc	Gilera	SUI; 4	IOM	NED; 6	BEL; 6	GER	ULS	NAT; 3	ESP; 4		12	8th	0
1953	500cc	Gilera	IOM	NED	BEL	GER	FRA	ULS	SUI	NAT	ESP; 5	2	15th	0
1954	500cc	MV Agusta	FRA	IOM	ULS	BEL	NED	GER	SUI	NAT	ESP; 3	4	13th	0
1955	500cc	MV Agusta	ESP; 5	FRA	IOM	GER	BEL	NED	ULS	NAT		2	20th	0

== Complete Formula One World Championship results ==
(key)

Year	Entrant	Chassis	Engine	1	2	3	4	5	6	7	WDC	Points
1950	Scuderia Achille Varzi	Maserati 4CLT/48	Maserati Straight-4	GBR	MON	500	SUI; 7	BEL	FRA	ITA	NC	0
