= Sante Geminiani =

Italian motorcycle racer (1919–1951)

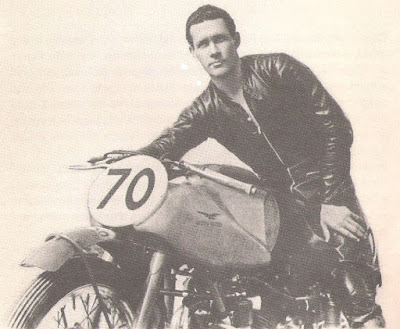
- Nationality: Italian
Motorcycle racing career statistics
Grand Prix motorcycle racing
Active years	1949–1951
First race	1949 500cc Nations Grand Prix
Last race	1951 500cc French Grand Prix
Team	Moto Guzzi
Starts / Wins / Podiums / Poles / F. laps / Points; 7 / 0 / 1 / 0 / 0 / 4

Sante Geminiani (4 September 1919 - 15 August 1951) was an Italian Grand Prix motorcycle road racer.

Born in Lugo in the Emilia-Romagna, Geminiani began his professional Grand Prix racing career in 1949 riding for the Moto Guzzi factory racing team. Gemiani finished in third place behind the dominant Gilera factory teammates, Geoff Duke and Alfredo Milani in the 1951 Belgian Grand Prix held at the Spa-Francorchamps Circuit. Geminiani was killed on August 15, 1951, after colliding with his Moto Guzzi teammate, Gianni Leoni, during practice for the Ulster Grand Prix held at the Clady Circuit in Northern Ireland.

== Career statistics ==
=== By season ===
Season	Class	Motorcycle	Race	Win	Podium	Pole	FLap	Pts	Plcd
1951	500cc	Moto Guzzi	1	0	1	0	0	4	13th
Total			1	0	1	0	0	4	
