= Fergus Anderson =

British motorcycle racer

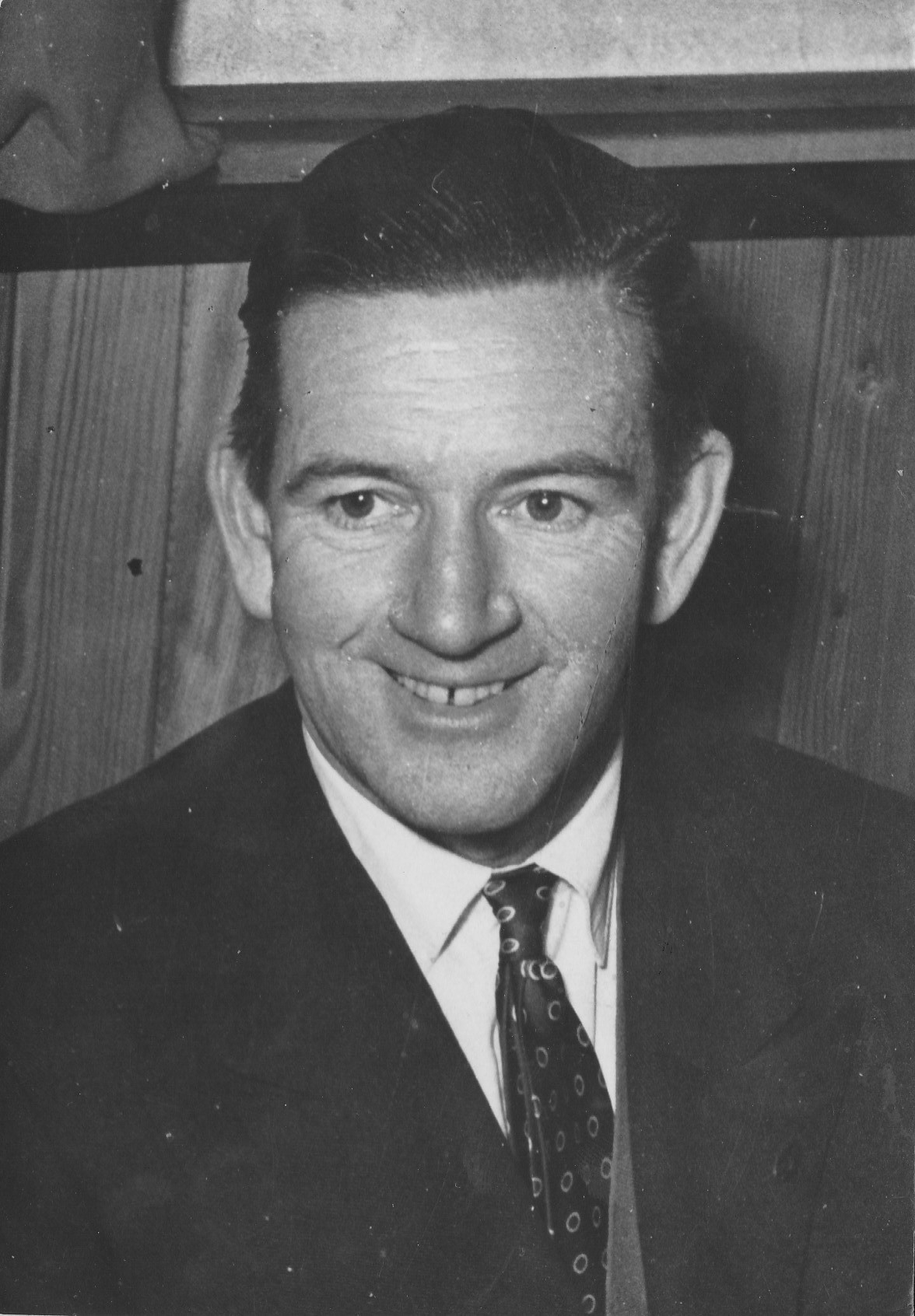
- Anderson in 1954
- Nationality: British
- Born: 9 February 1909; Croydon, Surrey, England, United Kingdom
- Died: 6 May 1956 (aged 47); Floreffe, Belgium
Motorcycle racing career statistics
Grand Prix motorcycle racing
Active years	1949 – 1954
First race	1949 250 cc Swiss Grand Prix
Last race	1954 350 cc Spanish Grand Prix
First win	1951 500 cc Swiss Grand Prix
Last win	1954 350 cc Spanish Grand Prix
Team	Moto Guzzi
Championships	350 cc – 1953, 1954
Starts / Wins / Podiums / Poles / F. laps / Points; 26 / 12 / 24 / 0 / 11
Isle of Man TT career
TTs contested	5 (1939, 1951 – 1954)
TT wins	2
First TT win	1952 Lightweight TT
Last TT win	1953 Lightweight TT
TT podiums	3

Fergus Kenrick Anderson (9 February 1909 – 6 May 1956) was a British professional motorcycle racer who competed in world championship road racing competitions from 1932 to 1956. He was one of the first British competitors to make his living racing motorcycles on the European continent, most prominently as a member of the Moto Guzzi factory racing team where he was a two-time Grand Prix World Champion.

== Motorcycle racing career ==
Anderson was born in Croydon, Surrey on 9 February 1909, the son of a Scottish naval architect. He was educated at Berkhamsted School, and as a young boy often attended motor races at the Brooklands Circuit. He purchased his first motorcycle in 1923, a Douglas, before he joined the Royal Navy in 1926.

Anderson competed in his first motorcycle race in 1927 at the age of 18, riding a Levis motorcycle borrowed from his sister without her knowledge. He then purchased a 500cc Cotton-Blackburne motorcycle which he used for Motorcycle speedway racing. Anderson was awarded a Brooklands Gold Star badge for having lapped the Brooklands circuit at over 100 mph (160 km/h) on a Grindlay Peerless motorcycle powered by a J.A.P. engine.

Fluent in four languages, Anderson enjoyed foreign travel and spent the 1930s competing in road racing events on the European continent riding a variety of motorcycles including; Rudge, Velocette, Excelsior, Norton and DKW. As well as being an accomplished golfer and sailor, he also worked for a short period as a writer for The Motor Cycle magazine.

Anderson entered his first major international motorcycle competition at the 1932 Spanish Grand Prix. In 1937 Anderson entered his first Isle of Man TT race, competing in both the Junior and Senior TT races aboard DKW motorcycles. He retired from the Junior race and placed 28th in the Senior TT.

After the outbreak of the Second World War, Anderson rejoined the Royal Navy where he served with the Small Vessels Pool, helping to ferry vessels from port to port along the British coastline. His name appears on the Nazis' "most wanted" list drawn up prior to their intended invasion of Britain (published online as "Hitler's Black Book" by Forces War Records).

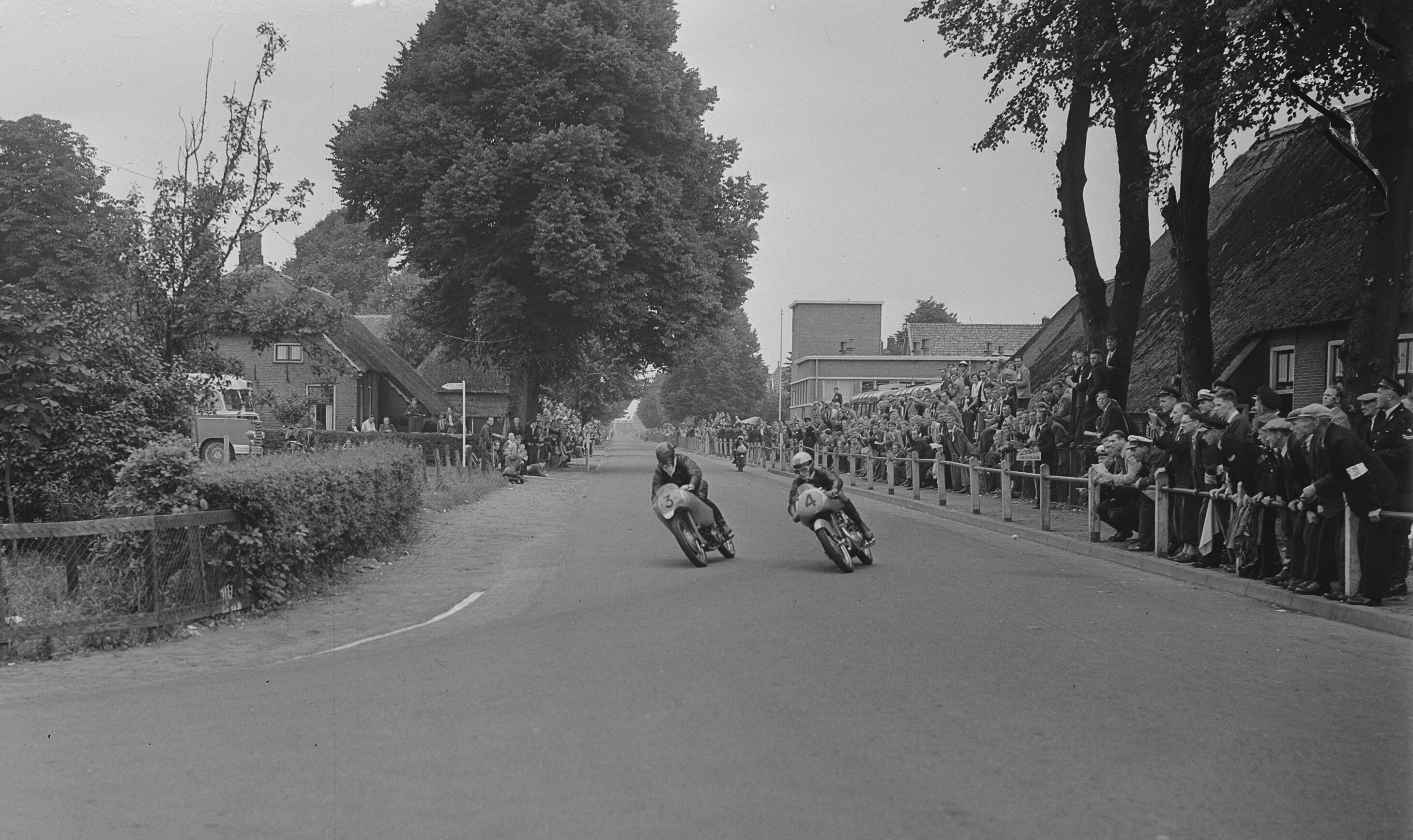
Anderson (3) racing with Werner Haas (4) during the 1953 250cc Dutch TT.

After the war, Anderson eagerly returned to motorcycle racing, winning 73 races in 1947. The 1947 350 cc Swiss Grand Prix was designated to be a one-race 350 cc European road racing championship. Anderson claimed the title by winning the race riding his privately funded Velocette KTT Mk VIII.

In 1949, the Fédération Internationale de Motocyclisme (FIM) organized motorcycle road racing into a World Championship series. Anderson finished in third place behind Bruno Ruffo (Moto Guzzi) and Dario Ambrosini (Benelli) at the 1949 250 cc Swiss Grand Prix, and finished the season ranked eighth in the inaugural 250 cc World Championship.

Anderson also competed in an automobile racing, driving a HWM Alta GP car in a non-championship Formula Two race at the Nürburgring circuit on 20 August 1950, but retired after five laps with a differential failure. The following weekend he entered the 1950 BRDC International Trophy run to Formula One regulations held at the Silverstone Circuit. Anderson faced off against a field of world-class competitors such as World Drivers' Champions Nino Farina and Juan Manuel Fangio, however he was forced to abandon the race after 28 laps with a transmission failure.

Anderson signed a contract with the Moto Guzzi factory racing team in 1950, and 10 September, he placed second to Ambrosini at the 250 cc Nations Grand Prix held at the Monza Circuit. In 1951, he won his first Grand Prix for the Moto Guzzi team in the 500 cc class at the Swiss Grand Prix. At the 1952 Isle of Man TT, he set new race (83.82 mph) and lap records (84.82 mph) to win the 250 cc Lightweight TT with his Moto Guzzi teammates Enrico Lorenzetti and Syd Lawton finishing in second and third places. He ended the 1952 250 cc World Championship in second place, four points behind Lorenzetti.

In 1953, Anderson repeated his victory in the Lightweight TT at the 1953 Isle of Man TT. His positive race results increased his influence with the Moto Guzzi factory, and he successfully convinced the management to build a 350 cc bike, initially of 320 cc but later a full 350. With the larger motorcycle, he won the Belgian, French and Swiss Grand Prix races to claim the 1953 350 cc World Championship. He placed fourth in the 1953 250 cc World Championship, and claimed his second 500 cc victory with a win at the season-ending 1953 Spanish Grand Prix, albeit in the absence of newly crowned 500 cc World Champion Geoff Duke, who didn't compete after having won the title at the previous round at Monza.

On 25 April 1954, Anderson won the prestigious, pre-season Mettet Grand Prix invitational race. He successfully defended his 350 cc World Championship in 1954 with four Grand Prix victories out of nine races. His 350 cc world championship wins for the Italian marque were the first by a non-British motorcycle manufacturer. Anderson became the oldest competitor in FIM history to win a Grand Prix race when, he won the 1953 Spanish Grand Prix at the age of 44 years and 273 days.

Anderson won his second consecutive Mettet Grand Prix on 1 May 1955, however withdrew from the World Championships after his criticism of the FIM's organization provoked them to cancel his racing license. He became Moto Guzzi's race team manager, but quit over a dispute over having a freer hand at running the team. He returned to racing and was offered a ride by the BMW factory. He died on 6 May 1956 at the age of 47, after being thrown from his motorcycle during a race in Floreffe, Belgium. Anderson was buried at the cemetery nearest the site of his accident in Namur, Belgium.

== Motorcycle Grand Prix results ==
1949 point system

Position	1	2	3	4	5	Fastest lap
Points	10	8	7	6	5	1

Points system from 1950 to 1968

Position	1	2	3	4	5	6
Points	8	6	4	3	2	1

5 best results were counted up until 1955.

(key) (Races in italics indicate fastest lap)

Year	Class	Team	1	2	3	4	5	6	7	8	9	Points	Rank	Wins
1949	250cc	Moto Guzzi	IOM -	SUI; 3	ULS -	NAT -						8	8th	0
1950	250cc	Moto Guzzi	IOM -	SUI -	ULS -	NAT; 2						6	3rd	0
1951	250cc	Moto Guzzi	ESP -	SUI -	IOM; NC	BEL -	NED -	FRA; 4	ULS -	NAT -		3	8th	0
1951	500cc	Moto Guzzi	ESP -	SUI; 1	IOM -	BEL -	NED -	FRA -	ULS -	NAT -		8	7th	1
1952	250cc	Moto Guzzi	SUI; 1	IOM; 1	NED; 3	GER -	ULS -	NAT; 3				24	2nd	2
1953	250cc	Moto Guzzi	IOM; 1	NED; 2		GER -		ULS; 3	SUI; 3	NAT -	ESP; 3	22	4th	1
1953	350cc	Moto Guzzi	IOM; 3	NED -	BEL; 1		FRA; 1	ULS -	SUI; 1	NAT; 2	ESP -	34	1st	3
1953	500cc	Moto Guzzi	IOM -	NED -	BEL -	GER -	FRA -	ULS -	SUI -	NAT -	ESP; 1	8	9th	1
1954	250cc	Moto Guzzi	FRA -	IOM; 5	ULS -		NED -	GER -	SUI -	NAT -		2	15th	0
1954	350cc	Moto Guzzi	FRA -	IOM; NC	ULS -	BEL; 2	NED; 1	GER -	SUI; 1	NAT; 1	ESP; 1	38	1st	4
1954	500cc	Moto Guzzi	FRA -	IOM; NC	ULS -	BEL -	NED; 2	GER; 5	SUI -	NAT -	ESP -	8	7th	0
