= Montjuïc Circuit =

Former street circuit located on the Montjuïc mountain in Barcelona, Catalonia, Spain

- Temporary Street Circuit (1933–1950, 1953–1986)
- Location: Montjuïc, Barcelona, Catalonia, Spain
- Coordinates: 41°21′59″N 2°09′06″E
- Opened: 1933
- Closed: 1986
- Major events: Montjuïc 24 Hours (1955–1986); FIM EWC (1960–1982); Grand Prix motorcycle racing Spanish motorcycle Grand Prix (1951–1955, 1961–1968, 1970, 1972, 1974, 1976); Formula One; Spanish Grand Prix (1969, 1971, 1973, 1975); European Formula Two Championship (1970, 1974); Sidecar World Championship (1951–1952, 1955, 1961–1967); Grand Prix motor racing Penya Rhin Grand Prix (1933–1936); Formula 750 (1973)

Temporary Street Circuit (1933–1950, 1953–1986)
- Length: 3.791 km (2.356 mi)
- Turns: 12
- Race lap record: 1:23.800 ( (Sweden) Ronnie Peterson, Lotus 72E, 1973, F1)

Temporary Street Circuit (1952)
- Length: 4.205 km (2.613 mi)
- Race lap record: 2:33.570 ( (Italy) Umberto Masetti, Gilera 500 Saturno "Piuma", 1952, 500cc)

Temporary Street Circuit (1951)
- Length: 6.033 km (3.749 mi)
- Race lap record: 3:45.000 ( (Italy) Enrico Lorenzetti, Moto Guzzi 500 Bicilindrica, 1951, 500cc)

The Montjuïc Circuit was a street circuit located on the Montjuïc mountain in Barcelona, Catalonia, Spain. The circuit was also the venue for the Spanish motorcycle Grand Prix twelve times between 1951 and 1976. The circuit hosted four Formula One Grand Prix races on non consecutive years between 1969 and 1975. The final Formula One Grand Prix it hosted was notable for both a fatal crash that led to Formula One abandoning the venue and for being the only occasion to date, that a female driver has scored World Championship points.

== History ==
By 1908 international motorsport was conducted at the Circuit Baix Penedès with the Copa Catalunya. In 1923 the first Great automobile Prize of Spain in the permanent Autódromo de Sitges-Terramar was run near Barcelona. In 1932 a race was held on a street circuit with the start in the Montjuïc Park, wooded parkland on a hill above the city's harbour. The course of the 1933 east circuit of that race became the Montjuïc Circuit proper, holding the Penya Rhin Grand Prix.

In 1968, Montjuïc was selected as the venue for the Spanish Grand Prix, which had been held at the Circuito del Jarama in Madrid, with the inaugural Grand Prix being held there on 4 May 1969. The variable character of the anticlockwise course (with one half slow and the other very fast) made setting the cars up correctly a challenge.

The 1975 Spanish Grand Prix was marked by tragedy. Many drivers felt that the circuit was unsafe, and two-time world champion Emerson Fittipaldi withdrew in protest before the start of the race. On lap 26 the Embassy Hill-Lola car of Rolf Stommelen left the track, killing five people. The race was subsequently stopped before half distance and half points awarded, with Jochen Mass being recorded as the winner. Lella Lombardi became the first and only female driver to score world championship points, taking 0.5 points for 6th place. Formula One never returned to the circuit after the accident.

The circuit of Montjuïc was also the scene of the 24 hours of Montjuïc, a motorcycle endurance race from 1960 to 1982.

The area where the circuit was located is now part of Anella Olímpica, where many Venues of the 1992 Summer Olympics are now located.

In 2004, the city council of Barcelona decided to mark the layout of the old circuit.

On 13–14 October 2007 the circuit was used for the Martini Legends, to honour the 75th anniversary of the circuit. Signalling the return of Formula One cars to Montjuïc, Emerson Fittipaldi (re-)appeared in his Lotus 72, and Marc Gené drove a contemporary Ferrari.

== Lap records ==
The fastest official race lap records at the Montjuïc Circuit are listed as:

Category	Time	Driver	Vehicle	Event
Temporary Street Circuit: 3.791 km (2.356 mi) (1933–1950, 1953–1986)
Formula One	1:23.800	Ronnie Peterson	Lotus 72E	1973 Spanish Grand Prix
Formula Two	1:25.580	Hans-Joachim Stuck	March 742	1974 Montjuïc F2 round
Group 5	1:29.800	Gérard Larrousse	Lola T292	1973 Montjuïc European Sportscar Championship round
Group 6	1:35.600	Jorge de Bagration	Porsche 908/02	1969 12 Hours of Montjuïc
350cc	1:42.300	Franco Uncini	Yamaha TZ 350	1976 Spanish motorcycle Grand Prix
250cc	1:43.000	Walter Villa	Harley-Davidson RR250	1976 Spanish motorcycle Grand Prix
125cc	1:48.800	Pier Paolo Bianchi	Morbidelli 125	1976 Spanish motorcycle Grand Prix
500cc	1:49.850	Angelo Bergamonti	MV Agusta 500 Three	1970 Spanish motorcycle Grand Prix
GP	1:56.000	Tazio Nuvolari	Alfa Romeo 12C-36	1936 Penya Rhin Grand Prix
50cc	1:57.000	Ángel Nieto	Bultaco TSS 50	1976 Spanish motorcycle Grand Prix
Temporary Street Circuit: 4.205 km (2.613 mi) (1952)
500cc	2:33.570	Umberto Masetti	Gilera 500 Saturno "Piuma"	1952 Spanish motorcycle Grand Prix
125cc	2:39.980	Emilio Mendogni	Moto Morini 125 GP	1952 Spanish motorcycle Grand Prix
Temporary Street Circuit: 6.033 km (3.749 mi) (1951)
500cc	3:45.000	Enrico Lorenzetti	Moto Guzzi 500 Bicilindrica	1951 Spanish motorcycle Grand Prix
350cc	3:47.000	Tommy Wood	Velocette 350 GP	1951 Spanish motorcycle Grand Prix
125cc	4:04.980	Carlo Ubbiali	Mondial 125SS	1951 Spanish motorcycle Grand Prix
