= Eric Oliver =

British motorcycle racer

- Oliver at the Vintage Motor Cycle Club's Founder's Day rally, race meeting and parade gathering, 27 April 1969
- Nationality: British
- Born: 13 April 1911
- Died: 1 March 1980 (aged 68)
Motorcycle racing career statistics
Grand Prix motorcycle racing
Active years	1949 - 1960
First race	1949 Isle of Man TT
Last race	1960 Isle of Man TT
First win	1949 Swiss Grand Prix
Last win	1954 Belgian Grand Prix
Team(s)	Norton, Velocette
Championships	4 (1949, 1950, 1951, 1953)
Starts / Wins / Podiums / Poles / F. laps / Points; / 17 / 19 / / / 160 (162)
Isle of Man TT career
TTs contested	14 (1937 - 1960)
TT wins	1
First TT win	1954 Sidecar TT
Last TT win	1954 Sidecar TT
TT podiums	1

Eric Staines Oliver (13 April 1911 – 1 March 1980) was an English motorcycle racer best remembered as four-time FIM Sidecar World Champion, riding a Norton. His passenger in 1949 was Denis Jenkinson. He is also remembered for his innovation, being the first sidecar competitor to use a dustbin fairing, rear suspension and the first to adopt a semi-kneeling riding position.

Oliver was also an accomplished solo racer and continued to ride a 350 Grand Prix bike while racing a sidecar.

Oliver made a surprising appearance in the 1958 Isle of Man Sidecar TT race on a standard Norton Dominator 88 with a Watsonian "Monaco" road sidecar with Mrs Pat Wise in the sidecar, finishing tenth ahead of many specialised race machines. Oliver's last TT appearance was in the 1960 with passenger Stan Dibben but they had a bad crash in practice with Oliver breaking his back in two places and Dibben was nearly decapitated. Both men decided to retire from racing after this.

Oliver later switched to car racing with a Lotus Elan and on 1 January 1955 opened a motorcycle dealership in Staines, later selling Reliant cars.

== World Championship results ==
**Position**	1	2	3	4	5	6
**Points**	8	6	4	3	2	1

(key) (Races in bold indicate pole position; races in italics indicate fastest lap. An empty black cell indicates that the class did not compete at that particular championship round.)

Year	Class	Motorcycle	1	2	3	4	5	6	7	8	9	Rank	Points
1949			IOM	SUI	NED	BEL	ULS	NAT					
1949	500 cc	Norton	Ret									—	0
1949	350 cc	Velocette	21			7						—	0
1949	Sidecar (with Denis Jenkinson)	Norton		1		1		5				**1st**	**28**
1950			IOM	BEL	NED	SUI	ULS	NAT					
1950	350 cc	Velocette						14				—	0
1950	Sidecar (with Lorenzo Dobelli)	Norton		1		1		1				**1st**	**24**
1951			ESP	SUI	IOM	BEL	NED	FRA	ULS	NAT			
1951	Sidecar (with Lorenzo Dobelli)	Norton	1	5		1		1		2		**1st**	**30 (32)**
1952			SUI	IOM	NED	BEL	GER	ULS	NAT	ESP			
1952	Sidecar (with Stanley Price)	Norton				1						5th	16
1952	Sidecar (with Lorenzo Dobelli)	Norton								1		5th	16
1953			IOM	NED	BEL	GER	FRA	ULS	SUI	NAT	ESP		
1953	Sidecar (with Stanley Dibben)	Norton			1		1		1	1		**1st**	**32**
1954			FRA	IOM	ULS	BEL	NED	GER	SUI	NAT	ESP		
1954	Sidecar (with Les Nutt)	Norton		1	1	1			5			**2nd**	**26**
1955			ESP	FRA	IOM	GER	BEL	NED	ULS	NAT			
1955	Sidecar (with Eric Bliss)	Norton	3		Ret		13					10th	4
1958			IOM	NED	BEL	GER	SWE	ULS	NAT				
1958	Sidecar (with Pat Wise)	Norton	10									—	0

Sporting positions
Preceded by None	World Sidecar Champion with Denis Jenkinson (1949); 1949-1951; With: Lorenzo Dobelli (1950-1951)	Succeeded by Cyril Smith with Bob Clements and Les Nutt
Preceded by Cyril Smith with Bob Clements and Les Nutt	World Sidecar Champion with Stanley Dibben; 1953	Succeeded by Wilhelm Noll with Fritz Cron
