= 1951 Swiss motorcycle Grand Prix =

(Switzerland) 1951 Swiss Grand Prix
Race details
- Race 3 of 8 races in the 1951 Grand Prix motorcycle racing season
- Date: 27 May 1951
- Location: Circuit Bremgarten
- Course: Permanent racing facility; 7.280 km (4.524 mi)

500cc
- Rider
Fastest lap
Rider	(United Kingdom) Geoff Duke	Norton
Time	3:02.0	
Podium
First	(United Kingdom) Fergus Anderson	Moto Guzzi
Second	(Republic of Ireland) Reg Armstrong	AJS
Third	(Italy) Enrico Lorenzetti	Moto Guzzi

350cc
- Rider
Fastest lap
Rider	(Republic of Ireland) Reg Armstrong	AJS
Time	3:11.9	
Podium
First	(United Kingdom) Leslie Graham	Velocette
Second	(United Kingdom) Cecil Sandford	Velocette
Third	(Republic of Ireland) Reg Armstrong	AJS

250cc
- Rider
Fastest lap
Rider	(Italy) Dario Ambrosini	Benelli
Time	3:29.9	
Podium
First	(Italy) Dario Ambrosini	Benelli
Second	(Italy) Bruno Ruffo	Moto Guzzi
Third	(Italy) Gianni Leoni	Moto Guzzi

Sidecar (B2A)
- Rider
Fastest lap
Rider	(United Kingdom) Eric Oliver	Norton
Time	3:38.9	
Podium
First	(Italy) Ercole Frigerio	Gilera
Second	(Italy) Albino Milani	Gilera
Third	(Italy) Ernesto Merlo	Gilera

The 1951 Swiss motorcycle Grand Prix was the second race of the 1951 Grand Prix motorcycle racing season. It took place on 27 May 1951 at the Bremgarten circuit.

== 500 cc classification ==
Pos	Rider	Manufacturer	Laps	Time	Points
1	(United Kingdom) Fergus Anderson	Moto Guzzi	28	1:34:44.2	8
2	(Republic of Ireland) Reg Armstrong	AJS	28	+1:47.9	6
3	(Italy) Enrico Lorenzetti	Moto Guzzi	28	+2:07.5	4
4	(Italy) Carlo Bandirola	MV Agusta			3
5	(Switzerland) Benoît Musy	Moto Guzzi			2
6	(Switzerland) Willy Lips	Norton			1
7	(West Germany) Hans Baltisberger	Norton			
8	(Switzerland) Max Forster	Gilera			
9	(Finland) Väinö Hollming	Moto Guzzi			
10	(United Kingdom) Sid Mason	Norton			
11	(United Kingdom) Tommy Wood	Norton			
12	(Austria) Alexander Mayer	Norton			

== 350 cc classification ==
Pos	Rider	Manufacturer	Laps	Time	Points
1	(United Kingdom) Leslie Graham	Velocette	22	1:10:48.5	8
2	(United Kingdom) Cecil Sandford	Velocette	22	+1:18.6	6
3	(Republic of Ireland) Reg Armstrong	AJS	22	+1:48.6	4
4	(Switzerland) Paul Fuhrer	Velocette			3
5	(United Kingdom) Sid Mason	Velocette			2
6	(Austria) Leonhardt Faßl	AJS			1
7	(West Germany) Hans Baltisberger	AJS			
8	(West Germany) Werner Mazanec	AJS			
9	(Switzerland) Herbert Laederach	AJS			
10	(Switzerland) Edmund Laederach	Norton			
11	(Finland) Väinö Hollming	Velocette			
12	(Austria) Helmut Volzwinkler	Norton			
13	(Switzerland) Heinrich Stamm	Velocette			
14	(United Kingdom) Denis Jenkinson	Norton			

== 250 cc classification ==
Pos	Rider	Manufacturer	Laps	Time	Points
1	(Italy) Dario Ambrosini	Benelli	18	1:05:32.1	8
2	(Italy) Bruno Ruffo	Moto Guzzi	18	+1:10.8	6
3	(Italy) Gianni Leoni	Moto Guzzi	18	+3:00.3	4
4	(Switzerland) Benoît Musy	Moto Guzzi			3
5	(United Kingdom) Cecil Sandford	Velocette			2
6	(Italy) Nino Grieco	Parilla			1
7	(Switzerland) H. Steffan	Parilla			
8	(Italy) Alano Montanari	Moto Guzzi			
9	(Switzerland) Hans Haldemann	Parilla			
10	(Italy) Carlo Bellotti	Moto Guzzi			
11	R. Thiery	Monet-Goyon			
12	(West Germany) Heinrich Thorn-Prikker	Moto Guzzi			

== Sidecar classification ==
Pos	Rider	Passenger	Manufacturer	Laps	Time	Points
1	(Italy) Ercole Frigerio	(Italy) Ezio Ricotti	Gilera	16	1:01:27.6	8
2	(Italy) Albino Milani	(Italy) Giuseppe Pizzocri	Gilera	16	+2:03.6	6
3	(Italy) Ernesto Merlo	(Italy) Dino Magri	Gilera	16	+2:56.4	4
4	(Belgium) Marcel Masuy	(United Kingdom) Denis Jenkinson	Norton			3
5	(United Kingdom) Eric Oliver	(Italy) Lorenzo Dobelli	Norton			2
6	(Italy) Giovanni Carru	(Italy) Carlo Musso	Carru			1
7	(Switzerland) Jakob Keller	(Switzerland) Gianfranco Zanzi	Eigenbau			
8	(Italy) Luigi Marcelli	?	Gilera			
9	(Switzerland) Henri Meuwly	?	Gilera			
10	(Switzerland) Heinrich Stamm	?	Norton			
11	(Italy) Renato Prati	(Italy) Marino Saguato	Moto Guzzi			
12	(Germany) F. Vaasen	?	Norton			
13	(Italy) Carlo Vittone	(Italy) ?	Carru			

Previous race: 1951 Spanish Grand Prix	FIM Grand Prix World Championship; 1951 season	Next race: 1951 Isle of Man TT
Previous race: 1950 Swiss Grand Prix	Swiss motorcycle Grand Prix	Next race: 1952 Swiss Grand Prix
