= Silvo Habat =

Slovenian motorcyclist

- Nationality: Slovenian
- Born: Trzin, Slovenia
Motorcycle racing career statistics
Grand Prix motorcycle racing
Active years	1987 – 1988
First race	1987 500cc German Grand Prix
Last race	1988 500cc Czechoslovak Grand Prix
Team	FE-GO
1988 championship position	0
Starts / Wins / Podiums / Poles / F. laps / Points; ? / 0 / 0 / 0 / 0 / 0

Silvo Habat is a Slovenian former professional Grand Prix motorcycle road racer.

Between 1984 and 1986, Habat won three 250cc national championships in the former Yugoslavia and became the first Yugoslav rider to win the highest award of the Yugoslavia in the 250cc class: the Zlata čelada (Gold Helmet). In 1987, he became the only Slovenian or ex-Yugoslav rider to compete in the 500cc world championships. Motor was bought by the Dutch competitor Boet van Dulmen. His best result was a 14th place in the World Championship race at Le Mans. That year, he performed well in the European Championships in Donnington and finished 11th place.

In 1988, Habat bought a brand new Honda RS500, and raced in world and European Championships. At the Grand Prix of Yugoslavia in Grobnik, Habat put Yugoslav race track record, which amounted to 1.36.0 min. In the race for the European Championship in Misano, he finished in sixth place. In August 1988, he participated in an international race in Schleiz (DDR), where he defeated almost all the competition for more than one lap and set an absolute race track record. His name is still engraved on the memorial stone that stands in the middle of the city Schleiz.

After the 1988 season, Habat retired from competition, but came out of retirement in 1991 when he bought an old Yamaha 250cc and began again to compete in the Slovenian national championships and international championships. He again conquered the highest places, and was twice vice-champion of Slovenia. He also had top three finishes in races in Austria, the Czech Republic and Germany. In 1993, he bought a Kawasaki ZXR750 and raced for two seasons in the Slovenian Superbike championship, finishing in second place in both seasons. Habat retired for good after the 1994 season.

== See also ==
- 1988 Czechoslovak motorcycle Grand Prix
- 1988 Yugoslavian motorcycle Grand Prix
- List of Grand Prix motorcycle racers: H
