= Ernie Lyons =

Irish motorcycle racer

- Lyons pictured when competing in an Irish international scramble event during 1966, wearing a rugby-type shirt, then standard apparel for competitors in Moto Cross events
- Nationality: Irish
- Born: 5 March 1914; Ireland
- Died: 7 February 2014 (aged 99); Kill, County Kildare, Ireland

Ernest William Lyons (5 March 1914 – 7 February 2014) was a motorcycle racer from Ireland who entered selected Grands Prix. He and Triumph factory employee Fred Clarke modified Triumph Tiger 100s for some races, with Lyons winning the 1946 Manx Grand Prix.

Their race bike's engine used lightweight aluminium components from a Triumph stationary-engine used for various wartime needs during World War II, including use on Halifax bombers for generator sets, and was also ridden by David Whitworth.

Lyons' winning motorcycle would become the prototype for the Triumph Grand Prix in 1948.

After road racing, Lyons was active as a competitive moto crosser.

Lyons died in February 2014 aged 99 at a nursing home in Kill, County Kildare, Ireland.

== Career statistics ==
=== By season ===
| Season | Class | Motorcycle | Race | Win | Podium | Pole | FLap | Pts | Plcd |
|---|---|---|---|---|---|---|---|---|---|
| 1949 | 350cc | Velocette | 1 | 0 | 1 | 0 | 0 | 8 | 7th |
| 1949 | 500cc | Velocette | 1 | 0 | 1 | 0 | 0 | 7 | 8th |
| Total | | | 2 | 0 | 2 | 0 | 0 | 15 | |
