= Alfredo Milani =

Italian motorcycle racer (1924–2017)

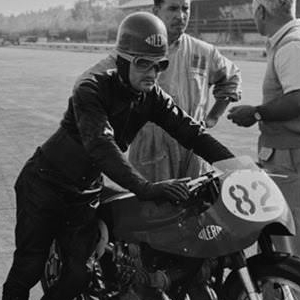
- Alfredo Milani in 1951
- Nationality: Italian
- Born: 6 January 1924; Garbagnate Milanese, Italy
- Died: 30 November 2017 (aged 93)
Motorcycle racing career statistics
Grand Prix motorcycle racing
Active years	1950 – 1951, 1953 – 1957
First race	1950 500cc Nations Grand Prix
Last race	1957 250cc Nations Grand Prix
First win	1951 500cc French Grand Prix
Last win	1953 500cc Belgian Grand Prix
Team	Gilera
Starts / Wins / Podiums / Poles / F. laps / Points; 14 / 3 / 9 / 0 / 3 / 85

Alfredo Milani (6 January 1924 – 30 November 2017) was an Italian Grand Prix motorcycle road racer. His best year was in 1951 when he won two Grand Prix races and finished second to Geoff Duke in the 500cc world championship. Milani rode for the Gilera factory for his entire career.
