= 1951 Spanish motorcycle Grand Prix =

(Spain) 1951 Spanish Grand Prix
Race details
- Race 1 of 8 races in the 1951 Grand Prix motorcycle racing season
- Date: 8 April 1951
- Location: Montjuïc circuit
- Course: Permanent racing facility; 6.033 km (3.749 mi)

500cc
- Rider
Fastest lap
Rider	(Italy) Enrico Lorenzetti	Moto Guzzi
Time	3:45	
Podium
First	(Italy) Umberto Masetti	Gilera
Second	(United Kingdom) Tommy Wood	Norton
Third	(Italy) Arciso Artesiani	MV Agusta

350cc
- Rider
Fastest lap
Rider	(United Kingdom) Tommy Wood	Velocette
Time	3:47	
Podium
First	(United Kingdom) Tommy Wood	Velocette
Second	(United Kingdom) Leslie Graham	Velocette
Third	(United Kingdom) Bill Petch	AJS

125cc
- Rider
Fastest lap
Rider	(Italy) Carlo Ubbiali	Mondial
Time	4:04.0	
Podium
First	(Italy) Guido Leoni	Mondial
Second	(Italy) Carlo Ubbiali	Mondial
Third	(Italy) Vincenzo Zanzi	Moto Morini

Sidecar (B2A)
- Rider
Fastest lap
Rider	(United Kingdom) Eric Oliver	Norton
Time	4:21	
Podium
First	(United Kingdom) Eric Oliver	Norton
Second	(Italy) Ercole Frigerio	Gilera
Third	(Italy) Albino Milani	Gilera

The 1951 Spanish motorcycle Grand Prix was the first round of the 1951 Grand Prix motorcycle racing season. It took place on 8 April 1951 at the Montjuïc circuit.

== 500 cc classification ==
Pos	Rider	Manufacturer	Laps	Time	Points
1	(Italy) Umberto Masetti	Gilera	34	2:10:56.2	8
2	(United Kingdom) Tommy Wood	Norton	34	+1:00.8	6
3	(Italy) Arciso Artesiani	MV Agusta			4
4	(Spain) Roger Montané	Norton			3
5	(Italy) Carlo Bandirola	MV Agusta			2
6	(Spain) Ernesto Vidal	Gilera			1

== 350 cc classification ==
Pos	Rider	Manufacturer	Laps	Time	Points
1	(United Kingdom) Tommy Wood	Velocette	25	1:36:21.7	8
2	(United Kingdom) Leslie Graham	Velocette	25	+2:30.0	6
3	(United Kingdom) Bill Petch	AJS			4
4	(Spain) Fernando Aranda	Moto Guzzi			3
5	(Belgium) Jack Raffeld	AJS			2
6	(Gibraltar) John Grace	AJS			1
7	(United Kingdom) Bob Matthews	Velocette			
8	(Spain) Antonio Creus	AJS			
9	(Spain) Juan Buira	AJS			
10	(United Kingdom) Len Parry	Velocette			
11	(Spain) Alfredo Flores	Velocette			
12	J. Gomar	AJS			

== 125cc classification ==
Pos	Rider	Manufacturer	Laps	Time/Retired	Points
1	(Italy) Guido Leoni	Mondial	17	1:11:21.8	8
2	(Italy) Carlo Ubbiali	Mondial	17	+4.6	6
3	(Italy) Vincenzo Zanzi	Moto Morini	17	+9.0	4
4	(Italy) Raffaele Alberti	Mondial	17	+1:50.2	3
5	(Spain) Juan Soler Bultó	Montesa	17	+3:00.7	2
6	(Spain) Arturo Elizalde	Montesa	17	+3:40.4	1
7	(Netherlands) Dick Renooy	Eysink			
8	(Netherlands) Toon van Zutphen	Eysink			
9	(Netherlands) Tonnie Heinemann	Eysink			
10	(Spain) "Setroc"	MV Agusta			
11	(Switzerland) Gianfranco Zanzi	Mondial			
12	(France) Jacques Vaque	MV Agusta			
21 starters, 12 finishers

== Sidecar classification ==
Pos	Rider	Passenger	Manufacturer	Laps	Time	Points
1	(United Kingdom) Eric Oliver	(Italy) Lorenzo Dobelli	Norton	17	1:16:03.1	8
2	(Italy) Ercole Frigerio	(Italy) Ezio Ricotti	Gilera	17	+2:04.1	6
3	(Italy) Albino Milani	(Italy) Giuseppe Pizzocri	Gilera	17	+2:27.5	4
4	(Italy) Giovanni Carru	(Italy) Carlo Musso	Carru			3
5	(Austria) Siegfried Vogel	(Austria) Leo Vinatzer	BMW			2
6	(Belgium) Marcel Masuy	(United Kingdom) Denis Jenkinson	Norton			1
7	(Italy) Renato Prati	(Italy) Marino Saguato	Moto Guzzi			

Previous race: 1950 Nations Grand Prix	FIM Grand Prix World Championship; 1951 season	Next race: 1951 Swiss Grand Prix
Previous race: 1950 Spanish Grand Prix	Spanish Grand Prix	Next race: 1952 Spanish Grand Prix
