= 1953 Grand Prix motorcycle racing season =

Sports season

1953 F.I.M. Grand Prix motorcycle racing season

Seasons
- ← 1952 1954 →

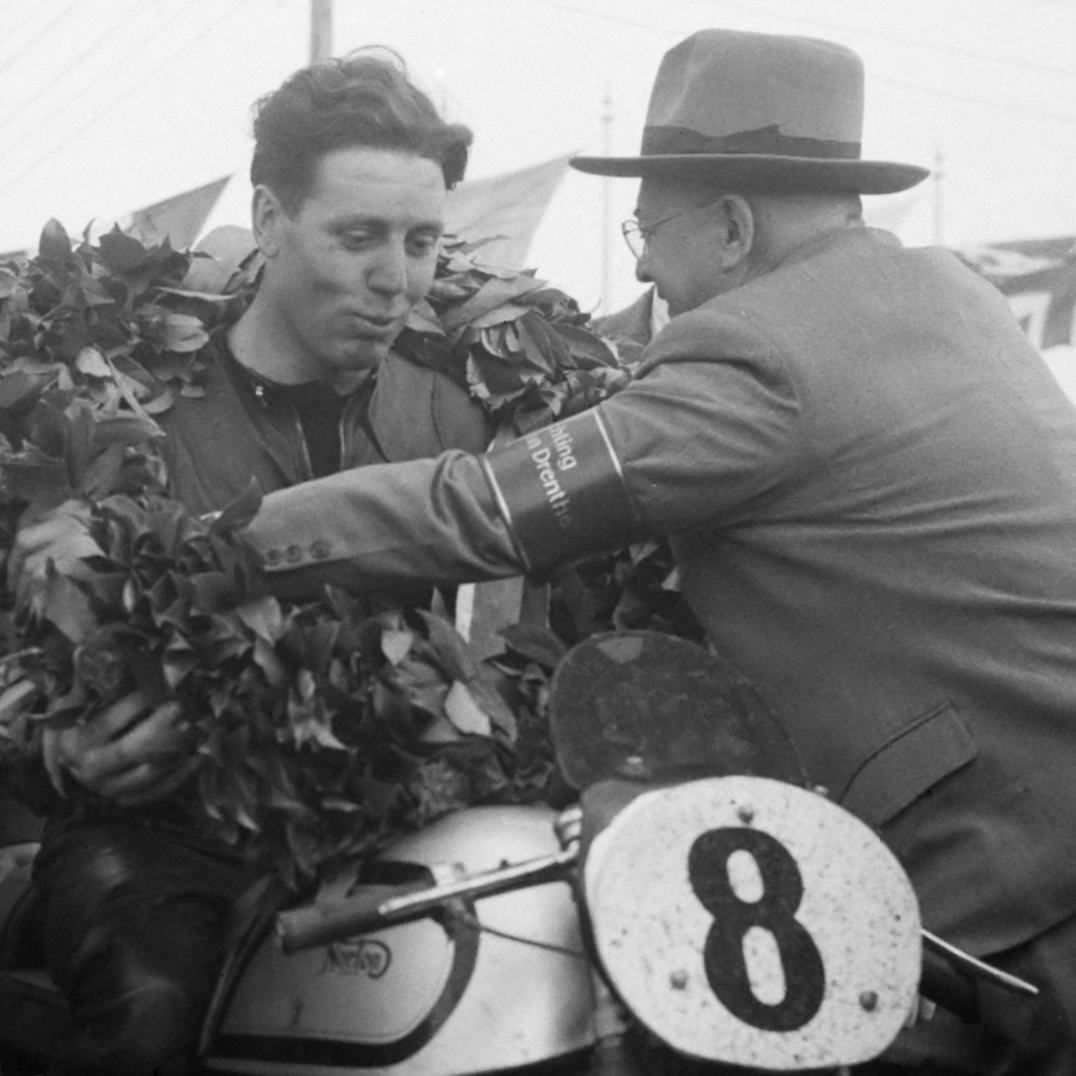
Geoff Duke (pictured in 1951) won his second 500cc World Championship title in 1953.

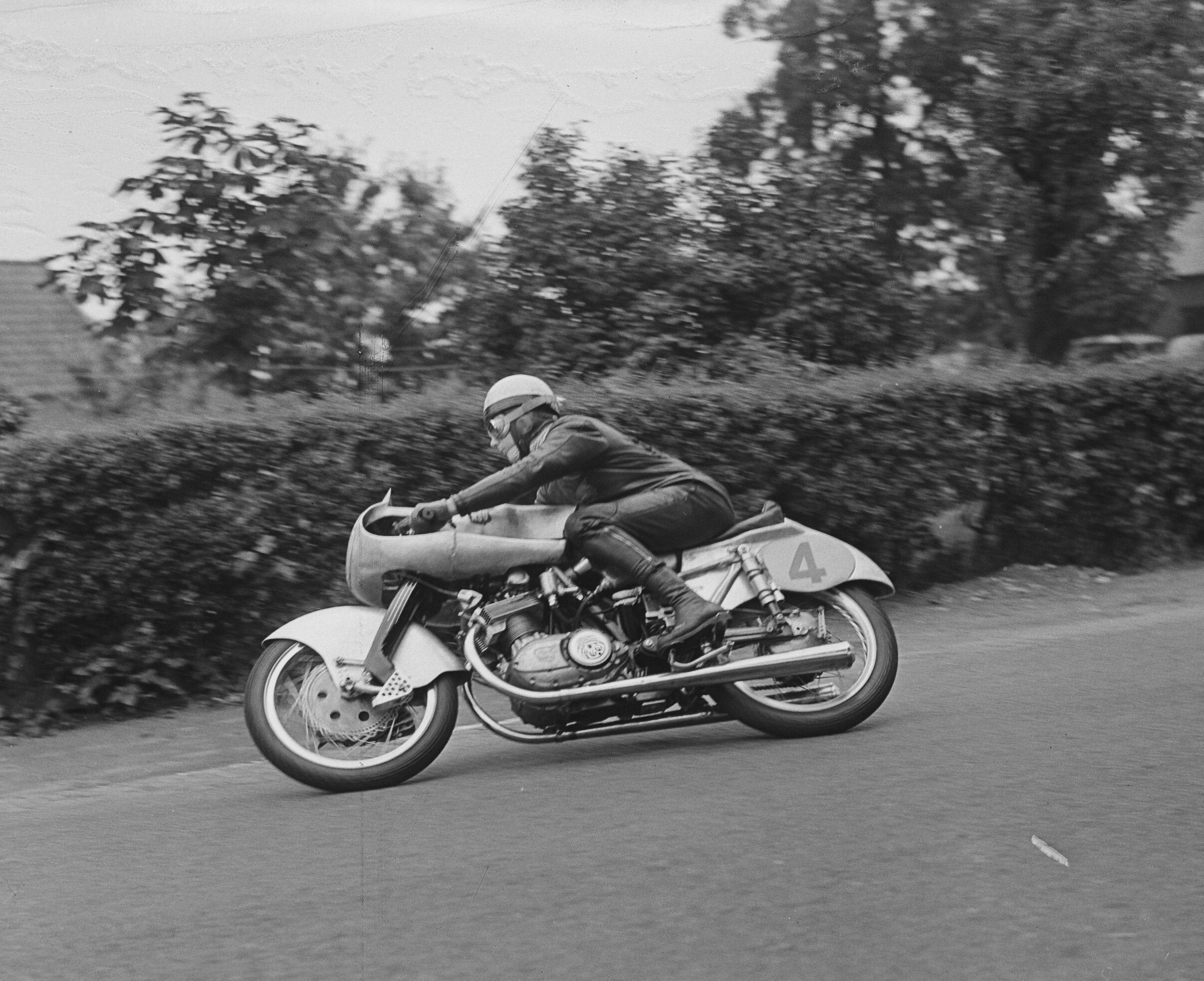
Werner Haas, the 1953 125cc and 250cc World Champion.

The 1953 Grand Prix motorcycle racing season was the fifth F.I.M. Road Racing World Championship Grand Prix season. The season consisted of nine Grand Prix races in five classes: 500cc, 350cc, 250cc, 125cc and Sidecars 500cc. It began on 12 June, with Isle of Man TT and ended with Spanish Grand Prix on 4 October.

== 1953 Grand Prix season calendar ==
Round	Date	Grand Prix	Circuit	125cc winner	250cc winner	350cc winner	500cc winner	Sidecars 500cc winner	Report
1	12 June	Isle of Man TT	Snaefell Mountain	(United Kingdom) Leslie Graham	(United Kingdom) Fergus Anderson	(Southern Rhodesia) Ray Amm	(Southern Rhodesia) Ray Amm		Report
2	27 June	(Netherlands) Dutch TT	Assen	(West Germany) Werner Haas	(West Germany) Werner Haas	(Italy) Enrico Lorenzetti	(United Kingdom) Geoff Duke		Report
3	5 July	(Belgium) Belgian Grand Prix	Spa-Francorchamps			(United Kingdom) Fergus Anderson	(Italy) Alfredo Milani	(United Kingdom) Oliver / Dibben	Report
4	19 July	(West Germany) German Grand Prix	Schottenring	(Italy) Carlo Ubbiali	(West Germany) Werner Haas	(Italy) Carlo Bandirola †	(West Germany) Walter Zeller †		Report
5	2 August	(France) French Grand Prix	Rouen-Les-Essarts			(United Kingdom) Fergus Anderson	(United Kingdom) Geoff Duke	(United Kingdom) Oliver / Dibben	Report
6	15 August	(Northern Ireland) Ulster Grand Prix	Dundrod	(West Germany) Werner Haas	(Republic of Ireland) Reg Armstrong	(New Zealand) Ken Mudford	(Australia) Ken Kavanagh	(United Kingdom) Smith / Nutt	Report
7	23 August	(Switzerland) Swiss Grand Prix	Bremgarten		(Republic of Ireland) Reg Armstrong	(United Kingdom) Fergus Anderson	(United Kingdom) Geoff Duke	(United Kingdom) Oliver / Dibben	Report
8	6 September	(Italy) Nations Grand Prix	Monza	(West Germany) Werner Haas	(Italy) Enrico Lorenzetti	(Italy) Enrico Lorenzetti	(United Kingdom) Geoff Duke	(United Kingdom) Oliver / Dibben	Report
9	4 October	(Spain) Spanish Grand Prix	Montjuïc	(Italy) Angelo Copeta	(Italy) Enrico Lorenzetti		(United Kingdom) Fergus Anderson		Report

† After pronouncing the track unsafe before practice had begun, all the factory teams withdrew from the 350cc and 500cc classes in the proposed German Grand Prix. The event continued, but with the agreement that these two classes were only counted as an ordinary international event.

== Standings ==
=== Scoring system ===
Points were awarded to the top six finishers in each race. Only the four best races counted in the Sidecars, 125cc and 250cc, while in the 350cc and 500cc championships, the five best results were counted.

Position	1st	2nd	3rd	4th	5th	6th
Points	8	6	4	3	2	1

=== 500cc final standings ===
Pos	Rider	Machine	MAN (United Kingdom)	HOL (Netherlands)	BEL (Belgium)	FRA (France)	ULS (Ulster)	SUI (Switzerland)	NAC (Italy)	ESP (Spain)	Pts
1	(United Kingdom) Geoff Duke	Gilera	Ret	1	Ret	**1**	2	1	1	DNS	**38**
2	(Republic of Ireland) Reg Armstrong	Gilera	3	2	3	2	4	3	4	Ret	**24** (30)
3	(Italy) Alfredo Milani	Gilera	Ret	Ret	1	3	Ret	2			**18**
4	(Australia) Ken Kavanagh	Norton / Moto Guzzi	Ret	3	4	4	1	Ret		Ret	**18**
5	(Southern Rhodesia) Ray Amm	Norton	**1**	Ret	2	DNS					**14**
6	(United Kingdom) Jack Brett	Norton	2	5	8	6	3	Ret			**13**
7	(United Kingdom) Dickie Dale	Gilera	Ret	Ret	6	8		7	2	3	**11**
8	(Italy) Giuseppe Colnago	Gilera		4	Ret	5		4		4	**11**
9	(United Kingdom) Fergus Anderson	Moto Guzzi		Ret	7				Ret	1	**8**
10	(New Zealand) Rod Coleman	AJS / Norton	4	Ret	5	7	7	5		Ret	**7**
11	(Italy) Carlo Bandirola	MV Agusta	Ret						Ret	2	**6**
12	(Italy) Libero Liberati	Gilera							3	Ret	**4**
13	(United Kingdom) Bill Doran	AJS	5	6	11						**3**
14	(United Kingdom) Derek Farrant	Matchless / AJS	Ret				5	6			**3**
15	(Italy) Nello Pagani	Gilera						9	7	5	**2**
16	(United Kingdom) Cecil Sandford	MV Agusta							5	Ret	**2**
17	(New Zealand) Ken Mudford	Norton	Ret	Ret	14		6			Ret	**1**
18	(United Kingdom) Tommy Wood	Norton			Ret	Ret				6	**1**
19	(Germany) Hermann Paul Müller	Horex / MV Agusta						Ret	6		**1**
20	(United Kingdom) Peter Davey	Norton	6								**1**
21	(Germany) Walter Zeller	BMW	Ret	7				8	Ret		**0**
22	(Spain) Javier de Ortueta	Norton								7	**0**
=	(United Kingdom) Ted Frend	Norton	7								**0**
24	(United Kingdom) Robin Sherry	AJS	8	Ret	Ret						**0**
25	(Netherlands) Piet Bakker	Norton		8							**0**
=	(Northern Ireland) Louis Carter	Norton					8				**0**
=	(Spain) Antonio Creus	Norton								8	**0**
=	(Italy) Bruno Francisi	MV Agusta							8	DNS	**0**
29	(Belgium) Auguste Goffin	Norton			10	Ret				9	**0**
=	(United Kingdom) Harry Pearce	Matchless	9		Ret		10				**0**
31	(France) Pierre Monneret	AJS / Gilera				12			9	Ret	**0**
32	(United Kingdom) Charlie Salt	BSA	16				9				**0**
33	(France) Pierre Cherrier	Norton				9					**0**
=	(Belgium) Léon Martin	Gilera			9						**0**
35	(United Kingdom) John Storr	Norton			Ret			Ret	10		**0**
36	(Germany) Hans Baltisberger	BMW						10		Ret	**0**
=	(Gibraltar) John Grace	Norton	10							Ret	**0**
38	(United Kingdom) Robin Fitton	Norton				10					**0**
=	(Spain) Alfredo Flores	Norton								10	**0**
=	(United Kingdom) Geoff Read	Norton		10							**0**
41	(Australia) Keith Bryen	Norton	Ret	11	18						**0**
42	(Australia) Laurie Boulter	Norton	11								**0**
=	(United Kingdom) Leslie Dear	Norton					11				**0**
=	(Italy) Enrico Galante	Norton							11		**0**
=	(United Kingdom) Sidney Mason	Norton				11					**0**
=	(Netherlands) Heer Meyer	BMW						11			**0**
=	(Germany) Heinz Thorn-Prikker	Moto Guzzi								11	**0**
48	(New Zealand) Leo Simpson	Matchless / AJS	Ret	Ret	12	Ret			Ret		**0**
49	(Switzerland) Jost Albisser	Norton				Ret		12	Ret		**0**
50	(Italy) Felice Benasedo	Moto Guzzi							12		**0**
=	(United Kingdom) Ken Harwood	AJS					12				**0**
=	(United Kingdom) Frank Norris	Norton	12								**0**
=	(Netherlands) Priem Rozenberg	Matchless		12							**0**
=	(Germany) Siegfried Wünsche	DKW								12	**0**
55	(United Kingdom) Arthur Wheeler	Matchless	Ret	Ret	13		15				**0**
56	(United Kingdom) Jack Bailey	Norton	20				13				**0**
57	(United Kingdom) Joe Glazebrook	Norton	22							13	**0**
58	(Netherlands) Lodweijk Simons	Matchless		13	Ret						**0**
59	(Switzerland) B. Botta	Norton						13			**0**
=	(Italy) Lodovico Facchinelli	Gilera							13		**0**
=	(United Kingdom) Eric Houseley	Norton	13								**0**
62	(New Zealand) Ray Laurent	Norton	15	9					14		**0**
63	(Northern Ireland) Malcolm Templeton	Matchless	14				Ret				**0**
=	(United Kingdom) Leonard Williams	Norton	Ret				14				**0**
65	(Switzerland) Florian Camathias	BMW						14		DNS	**0**
66	(Australia) Keith Campbell	Norton			15					DNS	**0**
=	(United Kingdom) Arthur Feen	Norton						15			**0**
=	(Italy) Antonio Ronchei	Gilera							15		**0**
69	(Northern Ireland) Charlie Gray	AJS	27				16				**0**
70	(Belgium) Roger Laurent	Norton			16						**0**
=	(Switzerland) Henri Vidonne	Norton					16				**0**
71	(United Kingdom) Sparky Campbell	Norton	Ret	Ret			17				**0**
72	(Belgium) Charles Bruguiere	Norton		Ret	17						**0**
73	(United Kingdom) Eric Pantlin	Norton	17								**0**
=	(East Germany) Karl Rührschneck	Norton						17			**0**
75	(United States) Nick Nicholson	Norton	18								**0**
=	(United Kingdom) Ernie Oliver	Norton					18				**0**
77	(United Kingdom) Bill Beevers	Norton	19								**0**
=	(United Kingdom) Reg MacDonald	AJS					19				**0**
=	(Belgium) Andrè Wuyts	Norton			19						**0**
80	(United Kingdom) Jimmy Hayes	AJS					20				**0**
81	(United Kingdom) Ken Swallow	AJS / Norton	Ret				21				0
82	(United Kingdom) Les Dear	Norton	21								0
83	(Dominion of Ceylon) Rally Dean	Norton	Ret	Ret			22				**0**
84	(Australia) George Scott	AJS	23	Ret							**0**
85	(United Kingdom) Robert Browne	AJS					23				**0**
86	(Dominion of Ceylon) Zachary Dean	Norton	35	Ret			24				**0**
87	(Northern Ireland) Peter Carter	Matchless	24								**0**
88	(South Africa) Ray Travers	Norton	25								**0**
=	(United Kingdom) Stanley Williamson	Norton					25				**0**
90	(United Kingdom) Fred Pusey	Norton					26				**0**
=	(United Kingdom) Roy Walker	Norton	26								**0**
92	(United Kingdom) Jackie Joseph Wood	Norton					27				**0**
93	(United Kingdom) Eric Hardy	AJS	28								**0**
94	(United Kingdom) Kel Prince	AJS	29								**0**
95	(United Kingdom) Sid Franklen	AJS	30								**0**
96	(United Kingdom) Luis Gilbert	AJS	31								**0**
97	(United Kingdom) Llewelyn Ranson	AJS	32								**0**
98	(United Kingdom) John Fisher	AJS	33								**0**
99	(United Kingdom) Bob McDonald	AJS	34								**0**
100	(United Kingdom) Jack Harding	Norton	36								**0**
–	(Australia) Tony McAlpine	Norton	Ret	Ret	Ret				Ret		0
–	(United Kingdom) Harold Clark	Matchless / Norton	Ret	Ret						Ret	0
–	(Italy) Enrico Lorenzetti	Moto Guzzi		Ret	Ret					Ret	0
–	(New Zealand) Peter Murphy	Matchless	Ret	Ret	Ret						**0**
–	(Australia) Ernie Ring	Matchless / AJS	Ret	Ret	Ret						**0**
–	(Germany) Friedel Schön	Horex		Ret	Ret	Ret					**0**
–	(New Zealand) Barry Stormont	Norton	Ret	Ret					Ret		**0**
–	(Germany) Fritz Kläger	Horex			Ret					Ret	**0**
–	(France) Georges Monneret	Gilera / Matchless				Ret			Ret		**0**
–	(United Kingdom) Humphrey Ranson	Norton		Ret	Ret						**0**
–	(Switzerland) Barde	Norton						Ret			**0**
–	(United Kingdom) Syd Barnett	Norton	Ret								**0**
–	(United Kingdom) Ernie Barrett	Phoenix-JAP	Ret								**0**
–	(Belgium) Francis Basso	Norton			Ret						**0**
–	(Switzerland) Carletto Bellotti	Norton						Ret			**0**
–	(United Kingdom) George Brown	Norton	Ret								**0**
–	(France) Georges Burgaff	Norton				Ret					**0**
–	(United Kingdom) John Clark	AJS	Ret								**0**
–	(United Kingdom) John Cooper	Matchless	Ret								**0**
–	(United Kingdom) Archie Fenn	Norton	Ret								**0**
–	(Italy) Giulio Galbiati	Moto Guzzi							Ret		**0**
–	(Italy) Martino Giani	MV Agusta						DNS	Ret		**0**
–	(United Kingdom) Leslie Graham	MV Agusta	Ret								**0**
–	(Italy) Francesco Guglielminetti	Norton							Ret		**0**
–	(United Kingdom) William Hall	Norton							Ret		**0**
–	(United Kingdom) Phil Heath	Matchless								Ret	**0**
–	(Canada) Robert Herbert	Triumph	Ret								**0**
–	(Germany) August Hobl	DKW								Ret	**0**
–	(Germany) Karl Hofmann	DKW								Ret	**0**
–	(Sweden) Kuno Johansson	Triumph	Ret								**0**
–	(United Kingdom) Cyril Julian	Norton	Ret								**0**
–	(Germany) Rudolf Knees	Norton		Ret							**0**
–	(United Kingdom) Dick Knox	Norton					Ret				**0**
–	(United Kingdom) Gordon Laing	Norton			Ret						**0**
–	(United Kingdom) George Leigh	Norton	Ret								**0**
–	(Italy) Umberto Masetti	Gilera		Ret							**0**
–	(Northern Ireland) Bob Matthews	Norton		Ret							**0**
–	(Austria) Alexander Mayer	Norton						Ret		DNS	**0**
–	(United Kingdom) Tommy McEwan	Matchless	Ret								**0**
–	(United Kingdom) Bob McIntyre	Matchless					Ret				**0**
–	(United Kingdom) John McKay	Triumph	Ret								**0**
–	(United Kingdom) George Morgan	Norton		Ret							**0**
–	(Northern Ireland) Mike O'Rourke	Matchless	Ret								**0**
–	(United Kingdom) Fred Passmore	Norton	Ret								**0**
–	(Belgium) Jacques Raffeld	Norton			Ret						**0**
–	(United Kingdom) Bob Rowbottom	AJS	Ret								**0**
–	(United Kingdom) Ron Rudge	Norton	Ret								**0**
–	(United Kingdom) Simon Sandys-Winsch	Norton		Ret							**0**
–	(Germany) Roland Schnell	Horex							Ret		**0**
–	(Italy) Emilio Soprani	Gilera								Ret	**0**
–	(Denmark) Sven Sørensen	Norton	Ret								**0**
–	(United Kingdom) Leo Starr	Norton	Ret								**0**
–	(Netherlands) Henk Steman	Matchless		Ret							**0**
–	(Belgium) Edouard Texidor	Norton			Ret						**0**
–	(Northern Ireland) Harry Turner	Norton					Ret				**0**
–	(Australia) Geoff Walker	Norton	Ret								**0**
–	(Australia) Sid Willis	Norton							Ret		**0**
–	(United Kingdom) Vic Willoughby	Norton	Ret								**0**
–	(Italy) Tito Forconi	MV Agusta								DNS	**0**
–	(Spain) Juan Leal	Norton								DNS	**0**
–	(United Kingdom) Albert Moule	Norton	DNS								**0**
–	(United Kingdom) Leonard Parry	DKW								DNS	**0**
–	(United Kingdom) Bill Petch	Norton								DNS	**0**
Pos	Rider	Bike	MAN (United Kingdom)	HOL (Netherlands)	BEL (Belgium)	FRA (France)	ULS (Ulster)	SUI (Switzerland)	NAC (Italy)	ESP (Spain)	Pts

Colour	Result
Gold	Winner
Silver	Second place
Bronze	Third place
Green	Points classification
Blue	Non-points classification
Blue	Non-classified finish (NC)
Purple	Retired, not classified (Ret)
Red	Did not qualify (DNQ)
Red	Did not pre-qualify (DNPQ)
Black	Disqualified (DSQ)
White	Did not start (DNS)
White	Withdrew (WD)
White	Race cancelled (C)
Blank	Did not practice (DNP)
Blank	Did not arrive (DNA)
Blank	Excluded (EX)

**Bold** – Pole
Italics – Fastest Lap

=== 350cc Standings ===
Place	Rider	Number	Country	Machine	Points	Wins
1	(United Kingdom) Fergus Anderson		United Kingdom	Moto Guzzi	34	3
2	(Italy) Enrico Lorenzetti		Italy	Moto Guzzi	26	2
3	(Southern Rhodesia) Ray Amm		Southern Rhodesia	Norton	18	1
4	(Australia) Ken Kavanagh		Australia	Norton	18	0
5	(United Kingdom) Jack Brett		United Kingdom	Norton	12	0
6	(New Zealand) Rod Coleman		New Zealand	AJS	9	0
7	(New Zealand) Ken Mudford		New Zealand	Norton	8	1
8	(Scotland) Bob McIntyre		United Kingdom	AJS	6	0
=	(France) Pierre Monneret		France	AJS	6	0
10	(Italy) Duilio Agostini		Italy	Moto Guzzi	4	0
11	(West Germany) August Hobl		Germany	DKW	3	0
=	(Switzerland) Josef Albisser		Switzerland	Norton	3	0
=	(United Kingdom) Harry Pearce		United Kingdom	Velocette	3	0
14	(United Kingdom) Bill Doran		United Kingdom	AJS	3	0
=	(United Kingdom) Derek Farrant		United Kingdom	AJS	3	0
16	(United Kingdom) Tommy Wood		United Kingdom	Norton	2	0
=	(Austria) Ernie Ring		Austria	AJS	2	0
=	(New Zealand) Leo Simpson		New Zealand	AJS	2	0
=	(United Kingdom) Malcolm Templeton		United Kingdom	AJS	2	0
20	(West Germany) Karl Hofmann		Germany	DKW	1	0
=	(New Zealand) Ray Laurent		New Zealand	Norton	1	0
=	(United Kingdom) Ken Harwood		United Kingdom	AJS	1	0
=	(Australia) Tony McAlpine		Australia	Norton	1	0

=== 250cc Standings ===
Place	Rider	Number	Country	Machine	Points	Wins
1	(West Germany) Werner Haas		Germany	NSU	28	2
2	(United Kingdom) Reg Armstrong		United Kingdom	NSU	23	2
3	(Italy) Enrico Lorenzetti		Italy	Moto Guzzi	22	2
4	(United Kingdom) Fergus Anderson		United Kingdom	Moto Guzzi	22	1
5	(Italy) Alano Montanari		Italy	Moto Guzzi	19	0
6	(Australia) Ken Kavanagh		Australia	Moto Guzzi	6	0
7	(West Germany) Siegfried Wünsche		Germany	DKW	6	0
8	(West Germany) August Hobl		Germany	DKW	6	0
9	(West Germany) Otto Daiker		Germany	NSU	6	0
10	(United Kingdom) Arthur Wheeler		United Kingdom	Moto Guzzi	4	0
11	(West Germany) Walter Reichert		Germany	NSU	3	0
12	(United Kingdom) Tommy Wood		United Kingdom	Moto Guzzi	3	0
13	(West Germany) Wolfgang Brandt		Germany	NSU	2	0
=	(Australia) Sid Willis		Australia	Velocette	2	0
15	(Italy) Umberto Masetti		Italy	NSU	1	0
=	(Austria) Rupert Hollaus		Austria	Moto Guzzi	1	0

=== 125cc ===
==== Riders' standings ====
Pos.	Rider	Bike	MAN (United Kingdom)	NED (Netherlands)	GER (Germany)	ULS (Ulster)	NAT (Italy)	ESP (Spain)	Pts
1	(West Germany) Werner Haas	NSU	2	1**^{F}**	2**^{F}**	1**^{F}**	1**^{F}**		30 (36)
2	(United Kingdom) Cecil Sandford	MV Agusta	3	3		2		2	20
3	(Italy) Carlo Ubbiali	MV Agusta		2	1		3	NC**^{F}**	18
4	(Italy) Angelo Copeta	MV Agusta	4		4		4	1	17
5	(United Kingdom) Leslie Graham	MV Agusta	1**^{F}**						8
6	(West Germany) Otto Daiker	NSU			3	4			7
7	(Italy) Emilio Mendogni	Morini					2		6
8	(West Germany) Wolfgang Brandt	NSU					5	4	5
9	(United Kingdom) Reg Armstrong	NSU			3				4
9	(Austria) Rupert Hollaus	NSU						3	4
11	(Italy) Luigi Zinzani	Morini		4					3
12	(United Kingdom) Arnold Jones	MV Agusta	5						2
12	(Netherlands) Drikus Veer	Morini		5					2
12	(West Germany) Walter Reichert	NSU			5				2
12	(Italy) Tito Forconi	MV Agusta				5			2
12	(Spain) Marcelo Cama	Montesa						5	2
17	(United Kingdom) Bill Webster	MV Agusta	6						1
17	(Netherlands) Lo Simons	MV Agusta		6					1
17	(West Germany) Karl Lottes	MV Agusta			6				1
17	(United Kingdom) Fron Purslow	MV Agusta				6			1
17	(Italy) Paolo Campanelli	MV Agusta					6		1
17	(West Germany) Georg Braun	Mondial						6	1
Pos.	Rider	Bike	MAN (United Kingdom)	NED (Netherlands)	GER (Germany)	ULS (Ulster)	NAT (Italy)	ESP (Spain)	Pts

Race key
Colour	Result
Gold	Winner
Silver	2nd place
Bronze	3rd place
Green	Points finish
Blue	Non-points finish
Blue	Non-classified finish (NC)
Purple	Retired (Ret)
Red	Did not qualify (DNQ)
Black	Disqualified (DSQ)
White	Did not start (DNS)
White	Withdrew (WD)
White	Race cancelled (C)
Blank	Did not practice (DNP)
Blank	Excluded (EX)
Blank	Did not arrive (DNA)
Blank	Did not enter (empty cell)
Annotation	Meaning
P	Pole position
F	Fastest lap
Rider key
Colour	Meaning
Light blue	Rookie rider

==== Constructors' standings ====
Each constructor is awarded the same number of points as their best placed rider in each race.

As MV Agusta and NSU had equal number of points, identical ranks obtained in all races, and equal number of races in which they classified, their finishing time in each of the six races was added up. MV Agusta's total time is 36.1 seconds quicker than NSU's total time, and was declared the constructors' champion.

Pos.	Constructor	MAN (United Kingdom)	NED (Netherlands)	GER (Germany)	ULS (Ulster)	NAT (Italy)	ESP (Spain)	Pts
1	(Italy) MV Agusta	1	2	1	2	3	1	30 (40)
4	(West Germany) NSU	2	1	2	1	1	3	30 (40)
3	(Italy) Morini		4			2		9
4	(Spain) Montesa						5	2
5	(Italy) Mondial		6				6	2
Pos.	Constructor	MAN (United Kingdom)	NED (Netherlands)	GER (Germany)	ULS (Ulster)	NAT (Italy)	ESP (Spain)	Pts
