= Gianni Leoni =

Italian motorcycle racer (1915–1951)

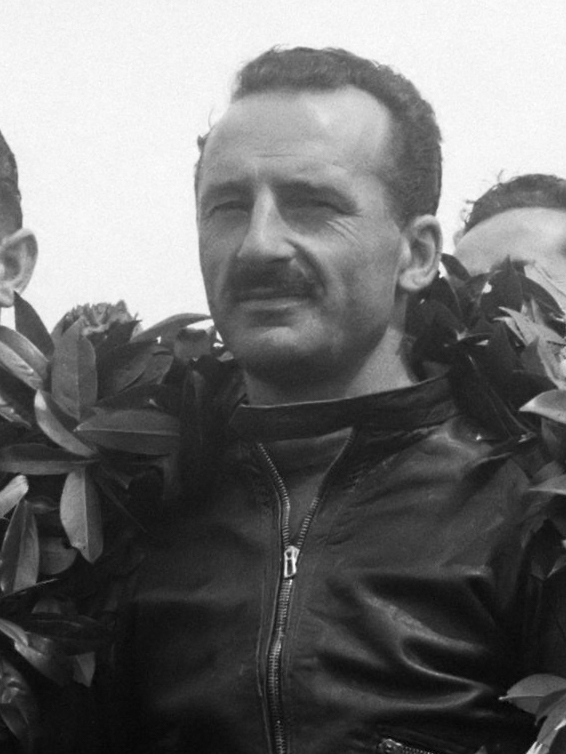
- Gianni Leoni (1951)
- Nationality: Italian
Motorcycle racing career statistics
Grand Prix motorcycle racing
Active years	1949 - 1951
First race	1949 125cc Nations Grand Prix
Last race	1951 250cc French Grand Prix
First win	1949 125cc Nations Grand Prix
Last win	1951 125cc Dutch TT
Team(s)	Moto Guzzi, Mondial
Starts / Wins / Podiums / Poles / F. laps / Points; 9 / 3 / 8 / 0 / 1 / 61

Gianni Leoni (1 March 1915 - 15 August 1951) was an Italian Grand Prix motorcycle road racer from Como. His best years were in 1950 when he finished second to Bruno Ruffo in the 125cc world championship and in the 1951 season, when he again finished in second place, this time to Carlo Ubbiali. Leoni was the winner of the first Nations Grand Prix in the inaugural 1949 Grand Prix motorcycle racing season. He was killed while competing in the 1951 Ulster Grand Prix after colliding with his team-mate Sante Geminiani, who also died in this incident.
