= Guido Leoni =

Italian motorcycle racer (1915–1951)

- Nationality: Italian
Motorcycle racing career statistics
Grand Prix motorcycle racing
Active years	1949, 1951
First race	1949 500cc Swiss Grand Prix
Last race	1951 125cc Spanish Grand Prix
First win	1951 125cc Spanish Grand Prix
Last win	1951 125cc Spanish Grand Prix
Team	Mondial
Starts / Wins / Podiums / Poles / F. laps / Points; 3 / 1 / 1 / N/A / N/A / 8

Guido Leoni (July 14, 1915 - May 6, 1951) was an Italian Grand Prix motorcycle road racer. He won the 1951 125cc Spanish Grand Prix riding for the Mondial factory racing team. One month later, while competing in a race in Ferrara, Leoni was involved in a multiple-bike accident and was killed. He was posthumously awarded fifth place in the 1951 125cc world championship.
