= Enrico Lorenzetti =

Italian motorcycle racer (1911–1989)

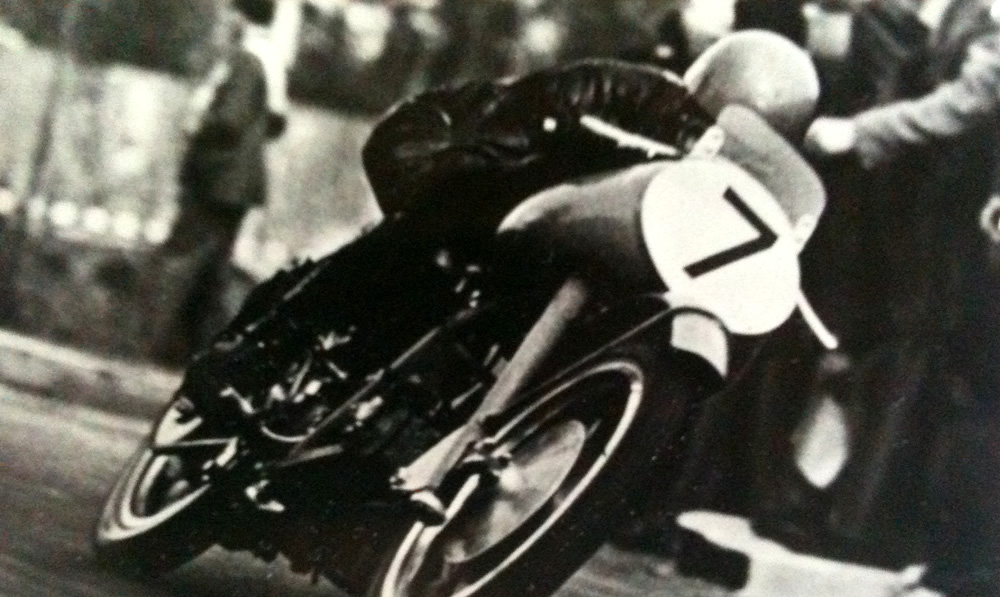
- Lorenzetti on a 250 cc Moto Guzzi.
- Nationality: Italian
Motorcycle racing career statistics
Grand Prix motorcycle racing
| Active years | 1949 - 1957 |
| First race | 1949 250cc Belgian Grand Prix |
| Last race | 1957 250cc Nations Grand Prix |
| First win | 1951 250cc Nations Grand Prix |
| Last win | 1953 250cc Spanish Grand Prix |
| Team | Moto Guzzi |
| Championships | 250cc - 1952 |
Starts / Wins / Podiums / Poles / F. laps / Points; 28 / 7 / 21 / N/A / 4 / 141

Enrico Lorenzetti (4 January 1911 – 8 August 1989) was an Italian professional Grand Prix motorcycle road racer who competed in the 1940s and 1950s.

Lorenzetti competed in the 1949 season riding a 500 cc Moto Guzzi and finished eighth overall with seven points behind Johnny Lockett. On 30 April 1950, he won the prestigious, pre-season Mettet Grand Prix invitational race. In 1952, he won the 250 cc World Championship for Moto Guzzi.

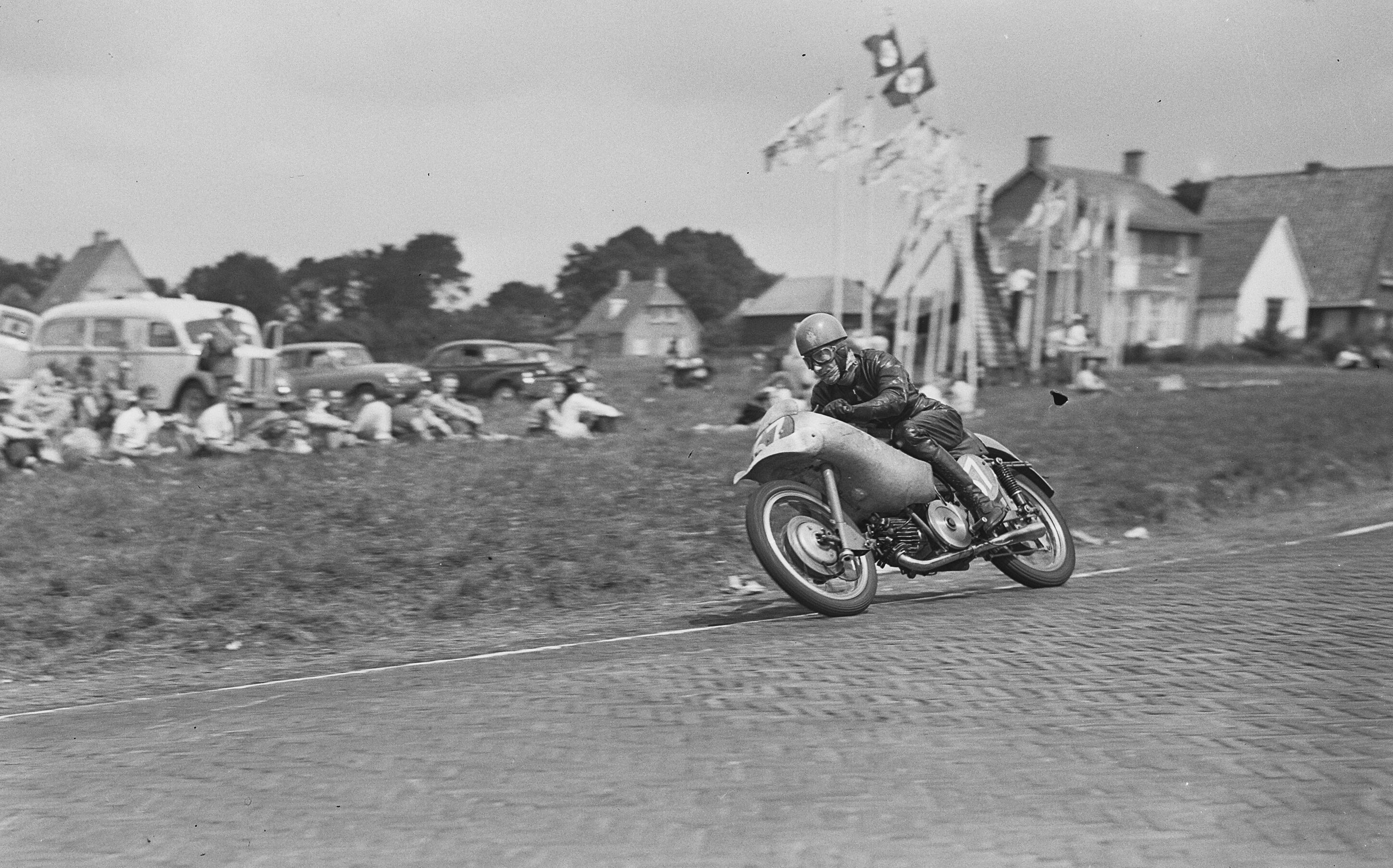
Lorenzetti en route to victory at the 1953 350cc Dutch TT.

== Motorcycle Grand Prix results ==
1949 point system:

| Position | 1 | 2 | 3 | 4 | 5 | Fastest lap |
| Points | 10 | 8 | 7 | 6 | 5 | 1 |

Points system from 1950 to 1968:

| Position | 1 | 2 | 3 | 4 | 5 | 6 |
| Points | 8 | 6 | 4 | 3 | 2 | 1 |

(Races in italics indicate fastest lap)

| Year | Class | Team | 1 | 2 | 3 | 4 | 5 | 6 | 7 | 8 | 9 | Points | Rank | Wins |
|---|---|---|---|---|---|---|---|---|---|---|---|---|---|---|
| 1949 | 500cc | Moto Guzzi | IOM - | SUI - | NED - | BEL; 3 | ULS - | NAT - | | | | 7 | 8th | 0 |
| 1951 | 250cc | Moto Guzzi | | SUI - | IOM; 3 | | | FRA - | ULS - | NAT; 1 | | 12 | 4th | 1 |
| 1951 | 500cc | Moto Guzzi | ESP - | SUI; 3 | IOM - | BEL; 3 | NED - | FRA - | ULS - | NAT - | | 8 | 8th | 0 |
| 1952 | 250cc | Moto Guzzi | SUI; 2 | IOM; 2 | NED; 1 | GER - | ULS; 2 | NAT; 1 | ESP - | | | 28 | 1st | 2 |
| 1953 | 250cc | Moto Guzzi | IOM - | NED; 4 | | GER - | | ULS; 4 | SUI; 4 | NAT; 1 | ESP; 1 | 22 | 4th | 2 |
| 1953 | 350cc | Moto Guzzi | IOM - | NED; 1 | BEL; 2 | | FRA; 3 | ULS - | SUI - | NAT; 1 | ESP - | 26 | 2nd | 2 |
| 1954 | 350cc | Moto Guzzi | FRA - | IOM - | ULS - | BEL; 4 | NED; 2 | GER - | SUI - | NAT; 2 | ESP; 8 | 15 | 5th | 0 |
| 1955 | 250cc | Moto Guzzi | | IOM - | GER - | | NED; 4 | ULS - | NAT - | | | 3 | 12th | 0 |
| 1955 | 350cc | Moto Guzzi | FRA - | IOM - | GER - | BEL - | NED - | ULS - | NAT; 4 | | | 3 | 12th | 0 |
| 1956 | 250cc | Moto Guzzi | IOM - | NED; 3 | BEL - | GER - | ULS - | NAT; 2 | | | | 10 | 3rd | 0 |
| 1957 | 250cc | Moto Guzzi | GER; 4 | IOM - | NED - | BEL - | ULS - | NAT; 3 | | | | 7 | 9th | 0 |
