= Tommy Wood (motorcyclist) =

British motorcycle racer

- Nationality: British
Motorcycle racing career statistics
Grand Prix motorcycle racing
Active years	1949, 1951, 1953 – 1954
First race	1949 350cc Swiss Grand Prix
Last race	1954 500cc Spanish Grand Prix
First win	1951 350cc Spanish Grand Prix
Last win	1951 Isle of Man 250cc Lightweight TT
Team	Moto Guzzi
Championships	0
Starts / Wins / Podiums / Poles / F. laps / Points; 16 / 2 / 6 / 0 / 2

Tommy Wood (17 February 1912 – 21 January 2003) was a British Grand Prix motorcycle road racer. He competed in his first Manx Grand Prix in 1937. His best season was in 1951, when he won two races, including the 1951 Isle of Man Lightweight TT, and finished second to Bruno Ruffo in the 250cc world championship.
