= 1951 Grand Prix motorcycle racing season =

Sports season

1951 F.I.M. Grand Prix motorcycle racing season

Seasons
- ← 1950 1952 →

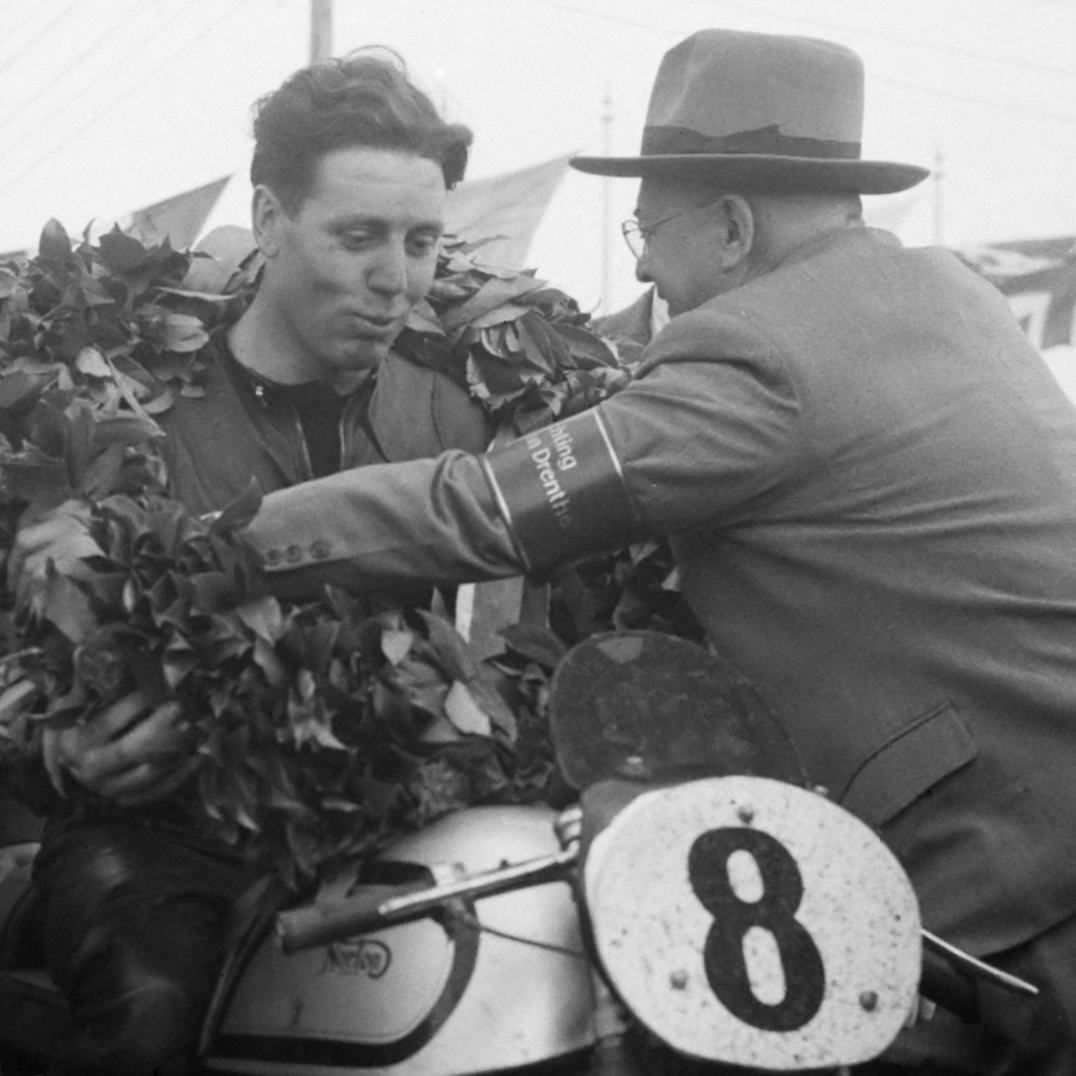
Geoff Duke, the 1951 350cc and 500cc World Champion.

The 1951 Grand Prix motorcycle racing season was the third F.I.M. Road Racing World Championship Grand Prix season. The season consisted of eight Grand Prix races in five classes: 500cc, 350cc, 250cc, 125cc and Sidecars 500cc. It began on 8 April, with Spanish Grand Prix and ended with Nations Grand Prix on 9 September. As of 2026, this is the most recent season the premier class was won by a non-Japanese or non-Italian constructor.

== 1951 Grand Prix season calendar ==
| Round | Date | Grand Prix | Circuit | 125cc winner | 250cc winner | 350cc winner | 500cc winner | Sidecars 500cc winner | Report |
|---|---|---|---|---|---|---|---|---|---|
| 1 | 8 April | (Spain) Spanish Grand Prix | Montjuïc | (Italy) Guido Leoni | | (United Kingdom) Tommy Wood | (Italy) Umberto Masetti | (United Kingdom) (Italy) Oliver / Dobelli | Report |
| 2 | 27 May | (Switzerland) Swiss Grand Prix | Bremgarten | | (Italy) Dario Ambrosini | (United Kingdom) Leslie Graham | (Scotland) Fergus Anderson | (Italy) Frigerio / Ricotti | Report |
| 3 | 8 June | Isle of Man TT | Snaefell Mountain | (Northern Ireland) Cromie McCandless | (United Kingdom) Tommy Wood | (United Kingdom) Geoff Duke | (United Kingdom) Geoff Duke | | Report |
| 4 | 1 July | (Belgium) Belgian Grand Prix | Spa-Francorchamps | | | (United Kingdom) Geoff Duke | (United Kingdom) Geoff Duke | (United Kingdom) (Italy) Oliver / Dobelli | Report |
| 5 | 7 July | (Netherlands) Dutch TT | Assen | (Italy) Gianni Leoni | | (United Kingdom) Bill Doran | (United Kingdom) Geoff Duke | | Report |
| 6 | 14 July | (France) French Grand Prix | Albi | | (Italy) Bruno Ruffo | (United Kingdom) Geoff Duke | (Italy) Alfredo Milani | (United Kingdom) (Italy) Oliver / Dobelli | Report |
| 7 | 18 August | (Northern Ireland) Ulster Grand Prix | Clady | (Northern Ireland) Cromie McCandless † | (Italy) Bruno Ruffo | (United Kingdom) Geoff Duke | (United Kingdom) Geoff Duke | | Report |
| 8 | 9 September | (Italy) Nations Grand Prix | Monza | (Italy) Carlo Ubbiali | (Italy) Enrico Lorenzetti | (United Kingdom) Geoff Duke | (Italy) Alfredo Milani | (Italy) Milani / Pizzocri | Report |

† The race saw only four competitors and was not counted as a round of the World Championship.

== Standings ==
=== Scoring system ===
Points were awarded to the top six finishers in each race. Only the best three races counted in the Sidecars, 125cc and 250cc, while in the 350cc and 500cc championships, the best five results counted.

| Position | 1st | 2nd | 3rd | 4th | 5th | 6th |
|---|---|---|---|---|---|---|
| Points | 8 | 6 | 4 | 3 | 2 | 1 |

==== 500cc final standings ====
| Pos | Rider | Machine | ESP (Spain) | SUI (Switzerland) | MAN (United Kingdom) | BEL (Belgium) | HOL (Netherlands) | FRA (France) | ULS (Ulster) | NAC (Italy) | Pts |
|---|---|---|---|---|---|---|---|---|---|---|---|
| 1 | (United Kingdom) Geoff Duke | Norton | | Ret | 1 | 1 | 1 | 5 | 1 | 4 | **35** |
| 2 | (Italy) Alfredo Milani | Gilera | Ret | Ret | | 2 | 2 | 1 | 4 | 1 | **31** |
| 3 | (Italy) Umberto Masetti | Gilera | 1 | | | 9 | **Ret** | **4** | 3 | 2 | **21** |
| 4 | (United Kingdom) Bill Doran | AJS | | | 2 | **Ret** | Ret | 2 | 6 | 6 | **14** |
| 5 | (Italy) Nello Pagani | Gilera | Ret | Ret | | 5 | 10 | 3 | 8 | 3 | **10** |
| 6 | (Republic of Ireland) Reg Armstrong | AJS | | 2 | Ret | 4 | | Ret | Ret | | **9** |
| 7 | (Scotland) Fergus Anderson | Moto Guzzi | Ret | 1 | | Ret | Ret | 7 | | | **8** |
| 8 | (Italy) Enrico Lorenzetti | Norton / Moto Guzzi | **Ret** | 3 | | 8 | 3 | 9 | | Ret | **8** |
| 9 | (United Kingdom) Tommy Wood | Norton | 2 | 11 | 14 | | | 16 | | | **6** |
| 10 | (Australia) Ken Kavanagh | Norton | | | Ret | | | | 2 | Ret | **6** |
| 11 | (United Kingdom) Johnny Lockett | Norton | | | Ret | 6 | 4 | 10 | 5 | 11 | **6** |
| 12 | (Italy) Carlo Bandirola | MV Agusta | 5 | 4 | | Ret | Ret | | | 9 | **5** |
| 13 | (Italy) Sante Geminiani | Moto Guzzi | Ret | Ret | | 3 | Ret | 13 | | | **4** |
| 14 | (Italy) Arciso Artesiani | MV Agusta | 3 | Ret | | | Ret | | | Ret | **4** |
| = | (Northern Ireland) Cromie McCandless | Norton | | | 3 | | | | | | **4** |
| 16 | (Isle of Man) Tommy McEwans | Norton | | | 4 | | | | | | **3** |
| = | (Spain) Roger Montané | Norton | 4 | | | | | | | | **3** |
| 18 | (United Kingdom) Jack Brett | Norton | | | | 7 | 5 | 6 | Ret | 8 | **3** |
| 19 | (Italy) Bruno Ruffo | Moto Guzzi | | | | | Ret | | | 5 | **2** |
| 20 | (Republic of Ireland) Manliff Barrington | Norton | | | 5 | | | | | | **2** |
| = | (Switzerland) Benoit Musy | Moto Guzzi | | 5 | | | | | | | **2** |
| 22 | (New Zealand) Len Perry | Norton | | | 9 | 12 | 6 | Ret | | | **1** |
| 23 | (Switzerland) Willy Lips | Norton | | 6 | | | | | | | **1** |
| = | (United Kingdom) Ashley Len Parry | Norton | | | 6 | | | | | | **1** |
| = | (Spain) Ernesto Vidal | Gilera | 6 | | | | | | | | **1** |
| 26 | (United Kingdom) Arthur Wheeler | Norton | | | Ret | | 7 | 14 | 11 | Ret | **0** |
| 27 | (Germany) Hans Baltisberger | Norton | | 7 | | | | | | | **0** |
| = | (United Kingdom) Eric Briggs | Norton | | | 7 | | | | | | **0** |
| = | (Northern Ireland) Louis Carter | Norton | | | | | | | 7 | | **0** |
| = | (Italy) Libero Liberati | Gilera | | | | | | | | 7 | **0** |
| 31 | (United Kingdom) Albert Moule | Norton | | | 8 | | | | 9 | | **0** |
| 32 | (United Kingdom) Bill Petch | AJS/ Norton | Ret | | | | Ret | 8 | Ret | 15 | 0 |
| 33 | (Netherlands) Lous van Riswijk | Triumph | | | | Ret | 8 | | | | 0 |
| 34 | (Switzerland) Massimo Forster | Gilera | | 8 | | | | | | | **0** |
| 35 | (Finland) Väinö Hollming | Norton / Moto Guzzi | | 9 | | Ret | | | | | **0** |
| 36 | (Netherlands) Cees Fokke-Bosch | Norton | | | | | 9 | | | | **0** |
| 37 | (New Zealand) Rod Coleman | Norton / AJS | | | Ret | 10 | | 11 | Ret | Ret | **0** |
| 38 | (United Kingdom) Sidney Mason | Norton | | 10 | | Ret | | | | | **0** |
| 39 | (United Kingdom) Ken Armstrong | Norton | | | | | | | | 10 | **0** |
| = | (Northern Ireland) Phil Carter | Norton | | | | | | | 10 | | **0** |
| = | (United Kingdom) Les Dear | Norton | | | 10 | | | | | | **0** |
| 42 | (Southern Rhodesia) Ray Amm | Norton | | | **28** | 11 | 11 | 12 | | 12 | **0** |
| 43 | (United Kingdom) Guy Newman | Norton | | | 11 | | | | | | **0** |
| 44 | (United Kingdom) Jack Bailey | Norton | | | Ret | | | | 12 | | **0** |
| = | (United Kingdom) Roy Evans | Norton / AJS | | | 12 | | | | Ret | | **0** |
| 46 | (Switzerland) Alexandre Mayer | Norton | | 12 | | | | | | | **0** |
| 47 | (United Kingdom) Harold Grindley | Norton | | | Ret | | | | 13 | | **0** |
| 48 | (Italy) Dante Bianchi | Moto Guzzi | | | | | | | | 13 | **0** |
| = | (United Kingdom) Dennis Lashmar | Norton | | | 13 | | | | | | **0** |
| 50 | (Northern Ireland) Maurice Acheson | AJS | | | | | | | 14 | | **0** |
| = | (Italy) Giuseppe Colnago | Gilera | | | | | | | | 14 | **0** |
| = | (Belgium) Auguste Goffin | Norton | | | | 14 | | | | | **0** |
| 53 | (United Kingdom) Bill Hall | Velocette | | | Ret | | | | 15 | | **0** |
| 54 | (France) Jean Behra | Moto Guzzi | | | | | | 15 | | | **0** |
| = | (Belgium) León Martin | Gilera | | | | 15 | | | | | **0** |
| = | (United Kingdom) Roy Walker | Velocette | | | 15 | | | | | | **0** |
| 57 | (Italy) Giulie Galbiati | Moto Guzzi | Ret | | | 17 | | Ret | | 16 | **0** |
| 58 | (Italy) Felice Benasedo | Moto Guzzi | Ret | | 31 | 16 | Ret | | | Ret | **0** |
| 59 | (United Kingdom) Robert Ferguson | AJS | | | | | | | 16 | | **0** |
| = | (United Kingdom) Sid Franklen | AJS | | | 16 | | | | | | **0** |
| 61 | (United Kingdom) Ernie Barrett | AJS | | | Ret | | | 17 | | | **0** |
| 62 | (United Kingdom) Syl Anderton | Norton | | | 17 | | | | | | **0** |
| = | (Italy) Lodovico Facchinelli | Gilera | | | | | | | | 17 | **0** |
| = | (United Kingdom) Jack Harding | AJS | | | | | | | 17 | | **0** |
| 65 | (France) Georges Houel | Gilera | Ret | | | | | 18 | | | **0** |
| 66 | (Northern Ireland) Charlie Gray | AJS | | | 18 | | | | | | **0** |
| = | (Northern Ireland) George Brockerton | Bitza | | | | | | | 18 | | **0** |
| = | (Belgium) Jaak Delsing | Triumph | | | | 18 | | | | | **0** |
| 69 | (United Kingdom) Leo Starr | AJS | | | 27 | | | | 19 | | **0** |
| 70 | (United Kingdom) Ernie Thomas | Velocette / Norton | | Ret | | 19 | | | | Ret | 0 |
| 71 | (Scotland) George Paterson | AJS | | | 19 | | | | | | **0** |
| 72 | (Denmark) Sven Sørensen | Norton | | | 20 | | | | | | **0** |
| = | (Belgium) Albert Vertriest | Triumph | | | | 20 | | | | | **0** |
| 74 | (Sweden) Evert Carlsson | Norton | | | | 21 | | | | | **0** |
| = | (United States) Ronald Pike | BSA | | | 21 | | | | | | **0** |
| 76 | (United Kingdom) Ray Petty | Norton | | | 22 | | | | | | **0** |
| 77 | (United Kingdom) Arnold Jones | Norton | | | 23 | | | | | | **0** |
| 78 | (United Kingdom) Achie Fenn | Norton | | | 24 | | | | | | **0** |
| 79 | (United Kingdom) Jim Kentish | AJS | | | 25 | | | | | | **0** |
| 80 | (United Kingdom) Humphrey Ranson | AJS / Norton | | | 26 | | | | | Ret | 0 |
| 81 | (Canada) Eddie Stidolph | Norton | | | 29 | | | | | | **0** |
| 82 | (United Kingdom) Max Klein | AJS | | | 30 | | | | | | **0** |
| 83 | (United Kingdom) Leslie Harris | Norton | | | 32 | | | | | Ret | **0** |
| 84 | (United Kingdom) Ernie Braine | Norton | | | 33 | | | | | | **0** |
| 85 | (United Kingdom) John Fisher | Velocette | | | 34 | | | | | | **0** |
| 86 | (United Kingdom) Joe Chapman | Rudge-Whitworth | | | 35 | | | | | | **0** |
| 87 | (United Kingdom) Bill Maddrick | Velocette | | | 36 | | | | | | **0** |
| 88 | (United Kingdom) J. Gunn | Norton | | | 37 | | | | | | **0** |
| 89 | (Northern Ireland) Bob McDonald | AJS | | | 38 | | | | | | **0** |
| 90 | (United Kingdom) Bill Beevers | AJS / Norton | Ret | | 39 | | | | | | 0 |
| – | (United Kingdom) Leslie Graham | MV Agusta / Norton | Ret | Ret | Ret | Ret | Ret | Ret | | Ret | 0 |
| – | (Italy) Bruno Bertacchini | MV Agusta | Ret | Ret | | | Ret | | | Ret | 0 |
| – | (Northern Ireland) Bob Matthews | Norton | Ret | Ret | | Ret | | | | Ret | **0** |
| – | (United Kingdom) Eric Oliver | Norton | Ret | | | Ret | | Ret | | Ret | **0** |
| – | (United Kingdom) Mick Featherstone | AJS | | | Ret | Ret | | | | | **0** |
| – | (United Kingdom) Charlie Salt | BSA / Velocette | | | Ret | | | | Ret | | **0** |
| – | (Belgium) Edouard Texidor | Norton | | | | Ret | | | | Ret | **0** |
| – | (Spain) Javier de Ortueta | Norton | DNS | | Ret | | | | | | **0** |
| – | (Spain) Fernando Aranda | Moto Guzzi | Ret | | | | | | | | **0** |
| – | (Belgium) Raymond Becquevort | AJS | Ret | | | | | | | | **0** |
| – | (Italy) Gaetano Biondelli | Gilera | | | Ret | | | | | | **0** |
| – | (United Kingdom) Charlie Brett | Norton | | | Ret | | | | | | **0** |
| – | (United Kingdom) Charlie Bruguiere | AJS | | | Ret | | | | | | **0** |
| – | (Switzerland) Florian Camathias | BMW | | Ret | | | | | | | **0** |
| – | (United Kingdom) Bernard Carter | Triumph | | | Ret | | | | | | **0** |
| – | (Northern Ireland) Phil Carter | Norton | | | Ret | | | | | | **0** |
| – | (France) Jacques Collot | Norton | | | | | | Ret | | | **0** |
| – | (Belgium) Eugéne Cordang | Triumph | | | | Ret | | | | | **0** |
| – | (Switzerland) Georges Cordey | Norton | | Ret | | | | | | | **0** |
| – | (Belgium) Firmin Dauwe | Norton | | | | Ret | | | | | **0** |
| – | (Belgium) Julien Deronne | Norton | Ret | | | | | | | | **0** |
| – | (France) Jacques Drion | Norton | | | | | | | | Ret | **0** |
| – | (Belgium) Roger Ergé | Norton | | | | Ret | | | | | **0** |
| – | (United Kingdom) Lennart Fenning | Norton | | | Ret | | | | | | **0** |
| – | (Italy) Tito Forconi | Gilera | | | | | | | | Ret | **0** |
| – | (United Kingdom) Frank Fry | Norton | | | Ret | | | | | | **0** |
| – | (Switzerland) Werner Gerber | Norton | Ret | | | | | | | | **0** |
| – | (Italy) Francesco Guglielminetti | Gilera | | | | | | | | Ret | **0** |
| – | (United Kingdom) Eric Hardy | Norton | | | Ret | | | | | | **0** |
| – | (United Kingdom) Philip Heath | Vincent | | | | | Ret | | | | **0** |
| – | (United Kingdom) Johnny Hodgkin | Vincent | | | Ret | | | | | | **0** |
| – | (United Kingdom) Chris Horn | Norton | | | Ret | | | | | | **0** |
| – | (United Kingdom) Sid Lawton | AJS | | | Ret | | | | | | **0** |
| – | (United Kingdom) George Leigh | Norton | | | Ret | | | | | | **0** |
| – | (Italy) Guido Leoni | Moto Guzzi | Ret | | | | | | | | **0** |
| – | (Republic of Ireland) Harry Lindsay | Norton | | | Ret | | | | | | **0** |
| – | (United Kingdom) Maurice Lockwood | AJS | | | Ret | | | | | | **0** |
| – | (Australia) Tony McAlpine | Gilera | | | Ret | | | | | | **0** |
| – | (United Kingdom) Reg McDonald | Velocette | | | Ret | | | | | | **0** |
| – | (United Kingdom) Stan Miller | Norton | | | Ret | | | | | | **0** |
| – | (France) Georges Monneret | Norton | | | | | | Ret | | | **0** |
| – | (United Kingdom) George Morgan | Velocette | | | Ret | | | | | | **0** |
| – | (New Zealand) Ken Mudford | AJS | | | Ret | | | | | | **0** |
| – | (United Kingdom) Alan Mullee | Norton | | | Ret | | | | | | **0** |
| – | (United Kingdom) Bill Mundy | Norton | | | Ret | | | | | | **0** |
| – | (United Kingdom) Arthur Pollitt | Norton | | | Ret | | | | | | **0** |
| – | (United Kingdom) Brian Purslow | BSA | | | | | | | Ret | | **0** |
| – | (Belgium) Jacques Raffeld | AJS | Ret | | | | | | | | **0** |
| – | (Republic of Ireland) Michael Roche | Triumph | | | | | | | Ret | | **0** |
| – | (Italy) Elio Scopigno | Moto Guzzi | | Ret | | | | | | | **0** |
| – | (United Kingdom) Oliver Scott | Norton | | | Ret | | | | | | **0** |
| – | (United Kingdom) Ralf Seymour | Velocette | | | Ret | | | | | | **0** |
| – | (United Kingdom) Cyril Stevens | Triumph | | | Ret | | | | | | **0** |
| – | (Switzerland) Heinrich Stamm | Gilera | Ret | | | | | | | | **0** |
| – | (United Kingdom) Jack Varlow | AJS | | | Ret | | | | | | **0** |
| – | (United Kingdom) Ernest Walker | Norton | | | Ret | | | | | | **0** |
| – | (United Kingdom) Leonard Williams | Velocette | | | Ret | | | | | | **0** |
| Pos | Rider | Bike | ESP (Spain) | SUI (Switzerland) | MAN (United Kingdom) | BEL (Belgium) | HOL (Netherlands) | FRA (France) | ULS (Ulster) | NAC (Italy) | Pts |

| Colour | Result |
|---|---|
| Gold | Winner |
| Silver | Second place |
| Bronze | Third place |
| Green | Points classification |
| Blue | Non-points classification |
| Blue | Non-classified finish (NC) |
| Purple | Retired, not classified (Ret) |
| Red | Did not qualify (DNQ) |
| Red | Did not pre-qualify (DNPQ) |
| Black | Disqualified (DSQ) |
| White | Did not start (DNS) |
| White | Withdrew (WD) |
| White | Race cancelled (C) |
| Blank | Did not practice (DNP) |
| Blank | Did not arrive (DNA) |
| Blank | Excluded (EX) |

**Bold** – Pole
Italics – Fastest Lap

==== Constructors' 500cc World Championship ====
| Pos | Constructor | Pts |
|---|---|---|
| 1 | (United Kingdom) Norton | **38** (44) |
| 2 | (Italy) Gilera | **36** (40) |
| 3 | (United Kingdom) AJS | **21** (23) |
| 4 | (Italy) Moto Guzzi | **18** |
| 5 | (Italy) MV Agusta | **7** |
| – | (Germany) BMW | **0** |
| – | (United Kingdom) BSA | **0** |
| – | (United Kingdom) Rudge-Whitworth | **0** |
| – | (United Kingdom) Triumph | **0** |
| – | (United Kingdom) Velocette | **0** |
| – | (United Kingdom) Vincent | **0** |

=== 350cc Standings ===
| Place | Rider | Number | Country | Machine | Points | Wins |
|---|---|---|---|---|---|---|
| 1 | (United Kingdom) Geoff Duke | | United Kingdom | Norton | 40 | 5 |
| 2 | (United Kingdom) Bill Doran | | United Kingdom | AJS | 19 | 1 |
| 3 | (United Kingdom) John Lockett | | United Kingdom | Norton | 19 | 0 |
| 4 | (Australia) Ken Kavanagh | | Australia | Norton | 16 | 0 |
| 5 | (United Kingdom) Jack Brett | | United Kingdom | Norton | 15 | 0 |
| 6 | (United Kingdom) Leslie Graham | | United Kingdom | Velocette | 14 | 1 |
| 7 | (Republic of Ireland) Reg Armstrong | | Ireland | AJS | 11 | 0 |
| 8 | (United Kingdom) Bill Petch | | United Kingdom | AJS | 10 | 0 |
| 9 | (United Kingdom) Cecil Sandford | | United Kingdom | Velocette | 9 | 0 |
| 10 | (United Kingdom) Tommy Wood | | United Kingdom | Velocette | 8 | 1 |
| 11 | (United Kingdom) Bill Lomas | | United Kingdom | Velocette | 6 | 0 |
| 12 | (New Zealand) Rod Coleman | | New Zealand | AJS | 5 | 0 |
| 13 | (United Kingdom) Mick Featherstone | | United Kingdom | AJS | 4 | 0 |
| 14 | (Spain) Fernando Aranda | | Spain | Velocette | 3 | 0 |
| = | (Switzerland) Paul Fuhrer | | Switzerland | Velocette | 3 | 0 |
| 16 | (United Kingdom) Sid Mason | | United Kingdom | Velocette | 2 | 0 |
| = | (Belgium) Jack Raffeld | | Belgium | Velocette | 2 | 0 |
| = | (United Kingdom) Simon Sandys-Winsch | | United Kingdom | Velocette | 2 | 0 |
| 19 | (Gibraltar) Johnny Grace | | Gibraltar | Norton | 1 | 0 |
| = | (Republic of Ireland) Bob Matthews | | Ireland | Velocette | 1 | 0 |
| = | (United Kingdom) Bob Foster | | United Kingdom | Velocette | 1 | 0 |
| = | (Austria) Leonhardt Faßl | | Austria | AJS | 1 | 0 |

=== 250cc Standings ===
| Place | Rider | Number | Country | Machine | Points | Wins |
|---|---|---|---|---|---|---|
| 1 | (Italy) Bruno Ruffo | | Italy | Moto Guzzi | 22 | 2 |
| 2 | (United Kingdom) Tommy Wood | | United Kingdom | Moto Guzzi | 18 | 1 |
| 3 | (Italy) Dario Ambrosini | | Italy | Benelli | 14 | 1 |
| 4 | (Italy) Enrico Lorenzetti | | Italy | Moto Guzzi | 12 | 1 |
| 5 | (Italy) Gianni Leoni | | Italy | Moto Guzzi | 10 | 0 |
| 6 | (United Kingdom) Maurice Cann | | United Kingdom | Moto Guzzi | 6 | 0 |
| = | (United Kingdom) Arthur Wheeler | | United Kingdom | Velocette | 6 | 0 |
| 8 | (United Kingdom) Fergus Anderson | | United Kingdom | Moto Guzzi | 3 | 0 |
| = | (United Kingdom) Wilf Hutt | | United Kingdom | Moto Guzzi | 3 | 0 |
| = | (Italy) Alano Montanari | | Italy | Moto Guzzi | 3 | 0 |
| = | (Switzerland) Benoit Musy | | Switzerland | Moto Guzzi | 3 | 0 |
| 12 | (United Kingdom) Bill Lomas | | United Kingdom | Velocette | 2 | 0 |
| = | (United Kingdom) Cecil Sandford | | United Kingdom | Velocette | 2 | 0 |
| = | (United Kingdom) Douglas Beasley | | United Kingdom | Velocette | 2 | 0 |
| = | (Italy) Bruno Francisci | | Italy | Moto Guzzi | 2 | 0 |
| 16 | (United Kingdom) Fron Purslow | | United Kingdom | Norton | 1 | 0 |
| = | (Republic of Ireland) Norman Blemings | | Ireland | Excelsior | 1 | 0 |
| = | (Switzerland) Werner Gerber | | Switzerland | Moto Guzzi | 1 | 0 |
| = | (Italy) Nino Grieco | | Italy | Parilla | 1 | 0 |
| = | (Italy) Guido Paciocca | | Italy | Moto Guzzi | 1 | 0 |

=== 125cc ===
==== Riders' standings ====
| Pos. | Rider | Bike | ESP (Spain) | MAN (United Kingdom) | NED (Netherlands) | NAT (Italy) | Pts |
|---|---|---|---|---|---|---|---|
| 1 | (Italy) Carlo Ubbiali | Mondial | 2**^{F}** | 2 | | 1**^{F}** | 20 |
| 2 | (Italy) Gianni Leoni | Mondial | | 3 | 1**^{F}** | | 12 |
| 3 | (United Kingdom) Cromie McCandless | Mondial | | 1**^{F}** | | 4 | 11 |
| 4 | (Italy) Luigi Zinzani | Morini | | | 2 | 3 | 10 |
| 5 | (Italy) Guido Leoni | Mondial | 1 | | | | 8 |
| 6 | (Italy) Vittorio Zanzi | Morini | 3 | | 4 | | 7 |
| 7 | (Italy) Romolo Ferri | Mondial | | | | 2 | 6 |
| 8 | (United Kingdom) Leslie Graham | MV Agusta | | | 3 | | 4 |
| 9 | (Spain) Juan Bultó | Montesa | 5 | 5 | | | 4 |
| 10 | (Italy) Raffaele Alberti | Mondial | 4 | | | | 3 |
| 10 | (Italy) Nello Pagani | Mondial | | 4 | | | 3 |
| 12 | (Italy) Franco Bertoni | MV Agusta | | | 5 | | 2 |
| 12 | (Italy) Otello Spadoni | Mondial | | | | 5 | 2 |
| 14 | (Spain) José Antonio Elizalde | Mondial | 6 | | | | 1 |
| 14 | (Spain) José Maria Llobet | Montesa | | 6 | | | 1 |
| 14 | (Italy) Emilio Mendogni | Morini | | | 6 | | 1 |
| 14 | (Italy) Giuseppe Matucci | MV Agusta | | | | 6 | 1 |
| Pos. | Rider | Bike | ESP (Spain) | MAN (United Kingdom) | NED (Netherlands) | NAT (Italy) | Pts |

Race key
| Colour | Result |
|---|---|
| Gold | Winner |
| Silver | 2nd place |
| Bronze | 3rd place |
| Green | Points finish |
| Blue | Non-points finish |
| Blue | Non-classified finish (NC) |
| Purple | Retired (Ret) |
| Red | Did not qualify (DNQ) |
| Black | Disqualified (DSQ) |
| White | Did not start (DNS) |
| White | Withdrew (WD) |
| White | Race cancelled (C) |
| Blank | Did not practice (DNP) |
| Blank | Excluded (EX) |
| Blank | Did not arrive (DNA) |
| Blank | Did not enter (empty cell) |
| Annotation | Meaning |
| P | Pole position |
| F | Fastest lap |
Rider key
| Colour | Meaning |
| Light blue | Rookie rider |

==== Constructors' standings ====
Each constructor is awarded the same number of points as their best placed rider in each race.

| Pos. | Constructor | ESP (Spain) | MAN (United Kingdom) | NED (Netherlands) | NAT (Italy) | Pts |
|---|---|---|---|---|---|---|
| 1 | (Italy) Mondial | 1 | 1 | 1 | 1 | 24 (32) |
| 2 | (Italy) Morini | 3 | | 2 | 3 | 14 |
| 3 | (Italy) MV Agusta | | | 3 | 6 | 5 |
| 4 | (Spain) Montesa | 5 | 5 | | | 4 |
| Pos. | Constructor | ESP (Spain) | MAN (United Kingdom) | NED (Netherlands) | NAT (Italy) | Pts |
