= Jarno Saarinen =

Finnish motorcycle racer (1945–1973)

- Nationality: Finnish
- Born: 11 December 1945; Turku, Finland
- Died: 20 May 1973 (aged 27); Autodromo Nazionale Monza, Italy
Motorcycle racing career statistics
Grand Prix motorcycle racing
Active years	1968, 1970 – 1973
First race	1968 125cc Finnish Grand Prix
Last race	1973 250cc Nations Grand Prix
First win	1971 350cc Czechoslovak Grand Prix
Last win	1973 250cc West German Grand Prix
Team	Yamaha
Championships	250cc – 1972
Starts / Wins / Podiums / Poles / F. laps / Points; 46 / 15 / 32 / N/A / 15

Jarno Karl Keimo Saarinen (11 December 1945 – 20 May 1973) was a Finnish professional Motorcycle racer. He competed in the FIM Grand Prix motorcycle racing world championships from 1968 to 1971 as Yamaha privateer, before receiving the Yamaha factory's full support in 1972 and 1973. In the early 1970s, he was considered one of the most promising and talented motorcycle road racers of his era until he was killed during the 1973 Nations Grand Prix in Italy. Saarinen's death led to increased demands for better safety conditions for motorcycle racers competing in the world championships. He remains the only Finn to have won a solo motorcycle road racing world championship. Saarinen was inducted into the F.I.M. MotoGP Hall of Fame in 2009.

== Motorcycle racing career ==
Saarinen was born and raised in Turku, South-West Finland. At the age of 15, he worked as apprentice and test-rider for Tunturi-Puch, motorcycle factory in Turku where mopeds and motorcycles were assembled under licence from the Austrian Puch manufacturer. Saarinen made his racing debut in an ice race at Ylone in 1961, finishing in second place. He and his close friend Teuvo Länsivuori participated in ice racing and grasstrack racing as well as road racing.

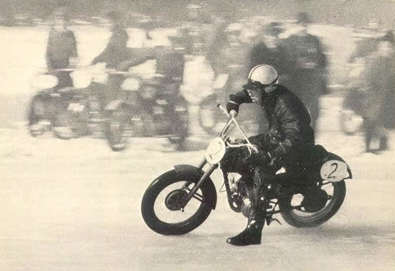
Saarinen during an ice racing competition in 1963

In 1965, Saarinen won the 250cc Finnish ice racing national championship ahead of Länsivuori, Martti Pesonen, and future 500cc Motocross World Champion, Heikki Mikkola. Saarinen was also an accomplished motorcycle speedway racer. On 4 August 1968, he made his Grand Prix debut at Imatra, riding a 125cc Puch to an 11th place in the Finnish Grand Prix, in which he was lapped three times by world champions Phil Read and Bill Ivy. In 1969, he won the 125cc and 250cc Finnish motorcycle road racing national championships while acting as his own mechanic.

Saarinen was noted for his distinctive riding style in which he kept his chest just above the motorcycle's fuel tank, and for the way he negotiated curves by shifting his body towards the inside of a turn while extending his knee out. His riding style, and the way he made his rear tyre slide in the turns influenced future world champion, Kenny Roberts, when he witnessed Saarinen during a race at the Ontario Motor Speedway in 1972. Saarinen rode at the Ontario Champion Sparkplugs Classic in 1972, aboard a privately entered ex-works Al Godin Yamaha 350cc. Saarinen was also noted for the peculiar way in which he angled his handlebars in an almost vertical position.

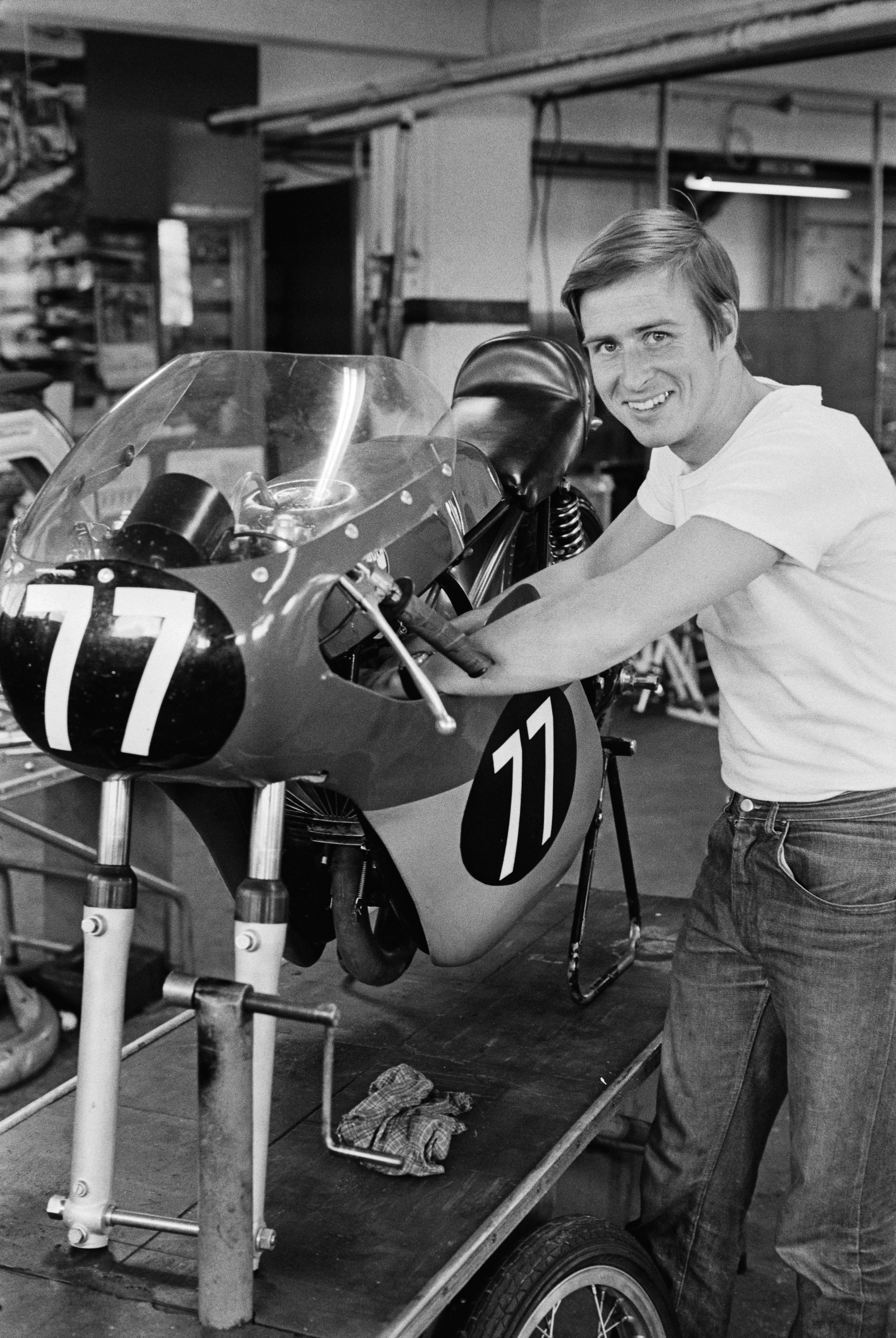
Jarno Saarinen with his motorcycle in 1970

Saarinen competed in his first full year in the 1970 250cc championship while continuing to act as his own mechanic. He convinced three bank managers to fund his racing career under the mistaken belief that they were financing his education. He finished the season in fourth place despite missing the final three rounds of the championship to complete his education by graduating as an engineer from the Turku Technical Institute.

In 1971, Giacomo Agostini was the reigning three-time 350cc world champion riding for MV Agusta however, Saarinen served notice by winning his first 350cc Grand Prix race in Czechoslovakia after Agostini's motorcycle had a mechanical failure. He then finished second to Agostini in the Finnish Grand Prix before winning the Nations Grand Prix in Italy. Saarinen competed in both 250cc and 350cc classes in 1971, finishing third in 250cc World Championship and second to Agostini in the 350cc class.

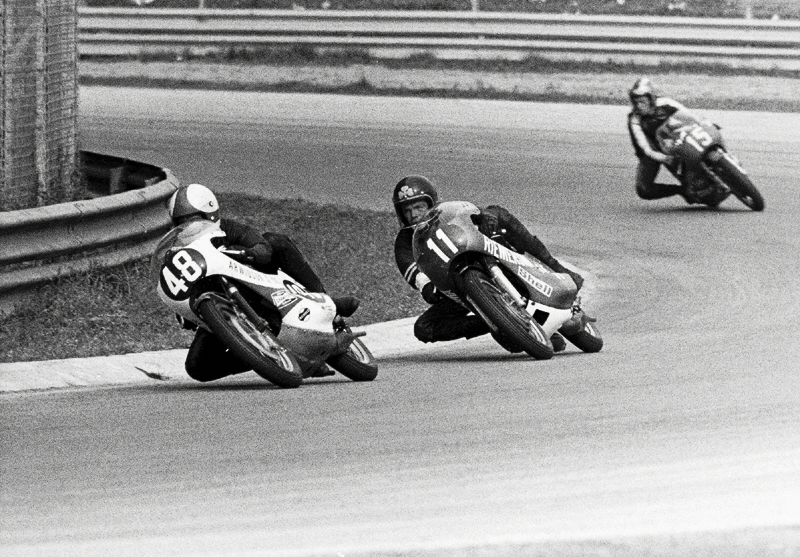
Jarno Saarinen (48) at 1971 Nations Grand Prix

The title fight in the 1971 50cc World Championship between the Derbi and Kreidler factories was so heated, that the Kreidler team hired Saarinen and Barry Sheene in support of their rider, Jan de Vries, while the Derbi team hired Gilberto Parlotti to support Ángel Nieto. At the season-ending Spanish Grand Prix, Saarinen placed second behind de Vries, helping the Kreidler team secure the 50cc World Championship for de Vries.

Saarinen's success didn't go unnoticed as the Yamaha factory contracted him to ride their 350cc factory YZ634 motorcycles for the 1972 season. Saarinen was also riding a 250cc Yamaha TD3 production racer supplied by the Finnish Yamaha Importer, Arwidson Oy. The 1972 250cc World Championship began with four different race-winners, (Hideo Kanaya, Phil Read, Börje Jansson, and Renzo Pasolini), however Saarinen led Pasolini in the championship points race due to his consistent results. His meticulous preparation of his motorcycle saw him score points in every race, including three podium finishes, while his rivals failed to capitalize. The Yamaha factory recalled Kanaya back to Japan for testing duties after the second Grand Prix in France, while Read and Jansson failed to score points.

After the Yugoslavian Grand Prix on June 18, the Yamaha factory gave Saarinen the factory 250cc Yamaha YZ635 that had been assigned to Barry Sheene, after the British rider had been sidelined by a broken collar bone during practice for the Nations Grand Prix and had complained about the motorcycle's performance. Saarinen rewarded Yamaha's faith in him by winning four of the last six Grand Prix races to clinch the 250cc World Championship, after a season-long battle with Renzo Pasolini and Rod Gould.

Saarinen finished second in the 1972 350cc World Championship, giving defending champion Giacomo Agostini a strong challenge by winning three races, including a victory at the German Grand Prix held at the daunting Nürburgring race track, where Saarinen inflicted Agostini his first defeat in a head-to-head race since the 1967 Canadian Grand Prix. He also scored a double victory at the Czechoslovak Grand Prix with victories in both the 250cc and 350cc classes. The threat from Saarinen's performance was so strong that the previously dominant MV Agusta factory was forced to produce a new 350cc motorcycle for Agostini and to hire Phil Read as his teammate for the remainder of the season. After the world championship season ended, Saarinen traveled to Great Britain where he won an astonishing nine wins in as many races, including the Race of the Year invitational held at Mallory Park.

At the end of the season, Saarinen was contacted by the Benelli factory about the possibility of riding 350cc and 500cc Benellis in the 1973 world championships. After a secret test ride at Modena, he rode Benellis to victories over Agostini in the 350cc and 500cc races at the Pesaro street circuit. However, in February 1973 the Yamaha factory announced they would enter a factory team in the 250cc and 500cc classes in 1973, with Saarinen as their top rider, alongside Hideo Kanaya to compete on the newly developed YZR250 and YZR500. The factory team also meant that he was provided with mechanics for his motorcycles, freeing him to concentrate on racing. With Saarinen signed to a contract, and a new 4-cylinder 2-stroke YZR500 0W20, Yamaha was finally ready to challenge MV Agusta's sixteen-year reign in the 500cc class with a competitive package.

Saarinen started the 1973 season competing in the season-opening Daytona 200, riding a Yamaha TZ 350 production racer against much larger 750cc motorcycles from the Kawasaki and Suzuki factory racing teams. The Kawasaki team fielded a total of six factory riders aboard its potent 750cc Kawasaki H2R, including former Daytona winner Gary Nixon and Yvon Duhamel, while the Suzuki team had four riders, with New Zealand Champion Geoff Perry and Don Emde as its top riders aboard the Suzuki TR750. As the race began, the Kawasakis and Suzuki teams took the lead, but one by one Saarinen's competitors began to abandon the race, either from crashes or mechanical failures. Saarinen patiently waited until taking the race lead on lap 32 and held on to take the victory ahead of Yamaha teammate Kel Carruthers. Saarinen became the first European rider to win the Daytona 200, which at the time, was considered one of the most prestigious motorcycle races in the world.

Saarinen returned to Europe where, against an impressive field of competitors, he claimed a victory at the prestigious Imola 200 round of the inaugural Formula 750 European championship in 1973, once again defeating competitors on larger motorcycles with the TZ 350.

Saarinen jumped to an early lead in the 1973 world championships by scoring a double victory at the season-opening French Grand Prix. He won the 250cc race more than 27 seconds ahead of his teammate Kanaya, and then beat Read by 16 seconds to win the 500cc race, where Agostini crashed while trying to follow the Finn. He followed this with another double victory at the Austrian Grand Prix held at the fast Salzburgring circuit, 13 seconds and 25 seconds ahead of Kanaya. He continued his winning streak by winning the 250cc German Grand Prix, more than 21 seconds ahead of his teammate but then failed to finish the 500cc race when his chain broke while he was dicing with Read for the win.

== Death ==
Saarinen arrived at the Nations Grand Prix leading both the 250cc and 500cc championships. The Monza Circuit, first opened in 1922, was fast and lined with steel barriers which left no room for error for motorcycle racers. The steel guardrails lining the circuit were installed as a result of demands by automobile racers following an accident which occurred during the 1961 Italian Grand Prix when racing driver Wolfgang von Trips and 15 spectators were killed. Most auto racers believed steel barriers would improve safety for auto racers and spectators, but they had the opposite effect for motorcyclists. When he arrived at Monza, Saarinen had complained about the guardrails, but no action was taken. Despite the installation of two new chicanes for cars during the previous year's Formula One season (placed before the Curva Grande and at Vialone) they were not used for motorcycle racing at Monza.

On the first lap of the 250cc race, tragedy struck when the second-placed rider, Renzo Pasolini's motorcycle lurched sideways and crashed into the guardrail, killing him instantly. Pasolini's motorcycle then bounced back onto the circuit and struck Saarinen on his head. The impact knocked off his helmet and he subsequently was hit by another motorbike sustaining fatal injuries. The crash caused a chain reaction accident in which more than 14 riders were involved including; Hideo Kanaya, Walter Villa, Victor Palomo, Fosco Giansanti, Börje Jansson and Chas Mortimer with several of them suffering serious injuries. The race was stopped and the following 500cc race was cancelled in the aftermath of the accident.

Over the years, the cause of the accident was the subject to significant controversy. The original cause of the crash was attributed to a thin layer of motor oil left on the track during the 350cc race when Walter Villa's Benelli began smoking and leaking oil on the penultimate lap. Race officials failed to clean the track prior to the 250cc race, and one rider, John Dodds, made his concerns known to authorities, only to meet with threats of ejection from the circuit by police. However, some articles have appeared showing photos of Pasolini's bike consistent with engine seizure, locking the rear wheel and causing the crash. Further the official inquiry into the accident, issued in September 1973 found that the cause of the accident was the seizure of the engine in the motorcycle of Renzo Pasolini.

== Legacy ==
The tragedy at Monza was a shock to the motorcycle racing community. Two of the sports best riders had been lost and the factory racing teams of Suzuki, MV Agusta, Harley Davidson, and Yamaha joined to demand safer conditions at race tracks. Only 40 days later, three riders in an Italian Juniors race were killed in the same turn. One month after the Nations Grand Prix, race teams took a stand and boycotted the Yugoslavian Grand Prix held at the Opatija street circuit in what is now Croatia due to dangerous track conditions. The Yamaha factory went further by withdrawing from racing for the rest of the year to honor Saarinen's memory.

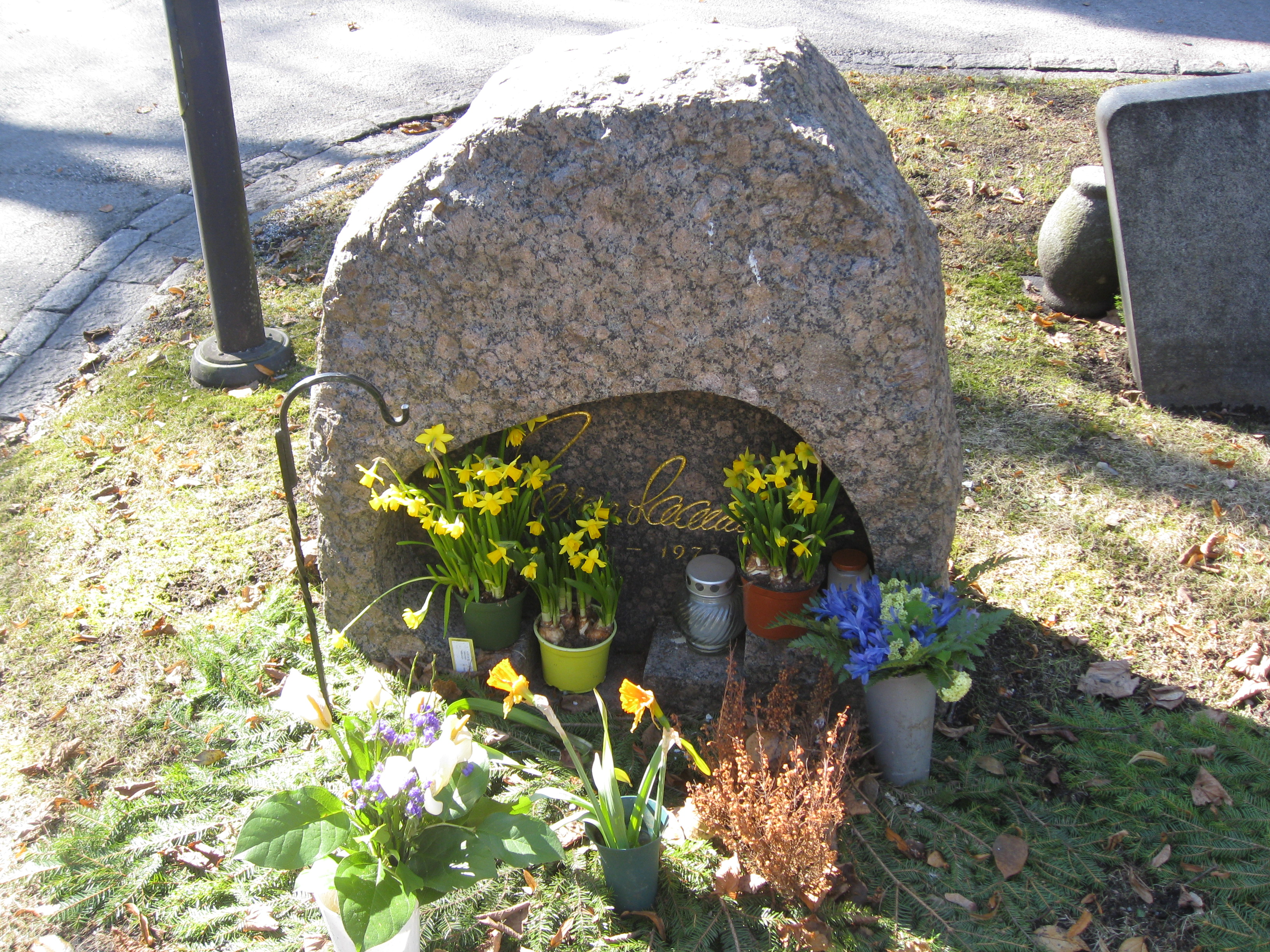
Jarno Saarinen's grave in Turku, Finland.

The death of Gilberto Parlotti at the 1972 Isle of Man TT and the deaths of Saarinen and Pasolini in 1973 highlighted the need for improved safety standards for motorcycle racers. At the time, many motorcycle Grand Prix races were still being held on street circuits with hazards such as telephone poles and railroad crossings. Dedicated race tracks of the time were also dangerous for motorcycle racers due to the steel Armco trackside barriers preferred by car racers. Tensions over safety issues continued to simmer throughout the 1970s between the Grand Prix racers, race organizers and the FIM, as riders showed their increasing dissatisfaction with the safety standards and the way races were organized by boycotting several Grand Prix races.

The situation reached a breaking point in 1979 when, the reigning 500cc world champion Kenny Roberts and journalist Barry Coleman attempted to break the FIM hegemony by organizing many of the top racers to begin the process of establishing a rival motorcycle championship called the World Series. Although the competing series failed to take off due to difficulties in securing enough venues, it forced the FIM to take the riders' demands seriously and make changes regarding their safety. During the 1979 FIM Congress, new rules were passed increasing prize money substantially and in subsequent years, stricter safety regulations were imposed on race organizers. In the following years, dangerous racing circuits were removed from the Grand Prix schedule. Race circuits began replacing the steel guardrails that lined the tracks and creating safe run-off areas. This would mark the beginning of an era of increased professionalism and improving safety standards in the sport. The current MotoGP and World Superbike championships are held at closed-course circuits. Monza has three slow chicanes on the circuit, but is not present on either calendar. The last street circuit in MotoGP was in 1990. Fatal crashes have still occurred in the 21st century, but at a much reduced rate compared to TT racing.

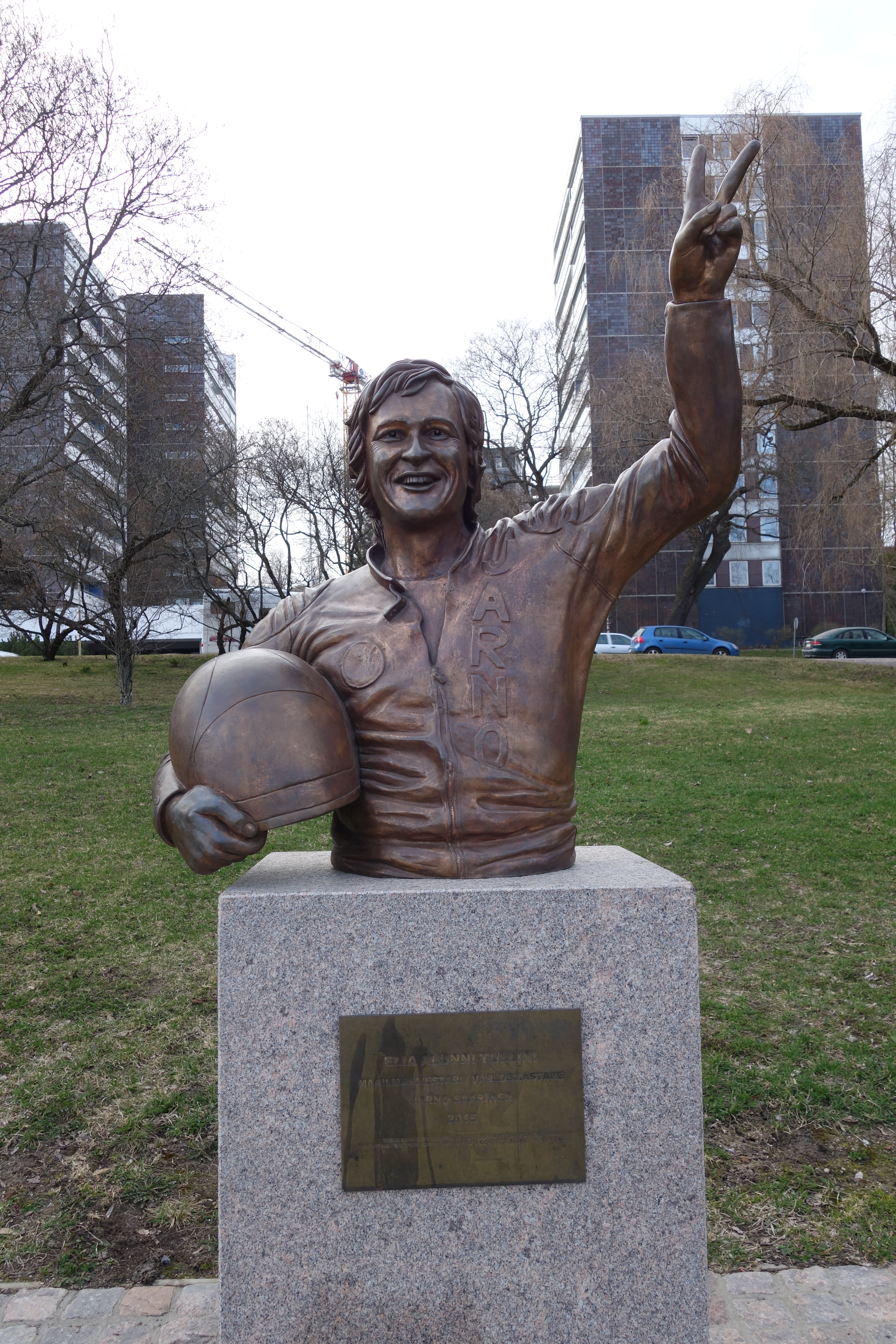
Jarno Saarinen Statue in Turku, Finland

The Ruissalo People's Park in Turku has a road named after Saarinen. The street in front of the Italian motorcycle manufacturer Benelli's factory in Pesaro is named Via Jarno Saarinen. The name Jarno became very popular in Italy in the 1970s, one well-known bearer being former Formula-1 driver Jarno Trulli. In 2009, the F.I.M. inducted Saarinen into the MotoGP Hall of Fame.

There is still an active Saarinen fan club in Italy, and on 7 June 2014, the fan club promoted the opening of Jarno Saarinen Park in Petrignano, Assisi, Italy. In August 2016, a bronze statue of Saarinen was unveiled in the park, and in July 2017, a duplicate of the statue was also revealed at Turku's Aurajoki Beach in Barker Park. Saarinen remains the only Finn to have won a motorcycle road racing world championship, winning 15 Grands Prix during his career. Saarinen was also a six time Finnish road racing national champion.

== Motorcycle Grand Prix results ==
**Position**	1	2	3	4	5	6	7	8	9	10
**Points**	15	12	10	8	6	5	4	3	2	1

(key) (Races in bold indicate pole position; races in italics indicate fastest lap)

Year	Class	Team	Machine	1	2	3	4	5	6	7	8	9	10	11	12	13	Points	Rank	Wins
1970	250cc	Private-Yamaha	TD-2	GER; 6	FRA; 4	YUG; 4	IOM -	NED; 3	BEL; 4	DDR; 4	TCH; 3	FIN; DNF	ULS -	NAT -	ESP -		57	4th	0
1971	50 cc	Van Veen	Kreidler	AUT -	GER -		NED -	BEL -	DDR -	TCH -	SWE -			NAT; 6	ESP; 2		17	12th	0
1971	250cc	Arwidson Team	TD-3	AUT; 8	GER -	IOM -	NED; DNF	BEL -	DDR; 5	TCH; 3	SWE; 3	FIN; 6	ULS; 2	NAT; 5	ESP; 1		64	**3rd**	1
1971	350cc	Arwidson Team	TR-2B	AUT; 6	GER; 5	IOM -	NED -		DDR -	TCH; 1	SWE; 3	FIN; 2	ULS; DNF	NAT; 1	ESP -		63	**2nd**	2
1972	250cc	Arwidson Team	TD-3 / YZ635	GER; 3	FRA; 4	AUT; 2	NAT; 3	IOM -	YUG; DNF	NED; 3	BEL; 1	DDR; 1	TCH; 1	SWE; 2	FIN; 1	ESP -	94	**1st**	4
1972	350cc	Arwidson Team	YZ634	GER; 1	FRA; 1	AUT; 4	NAT; 3	IOM -	YUG; DNF	NED; 2		DDR; DNF	TCH; 1	SWE; 3	FIN; 2	ESP -	89	**2nd**	3
1973	250cc	Yamaha-Japan	YZR250 0W17	FRA; 1	AUT; 1	GER; 1	NAT; DNF	IOM -	-	-	-	-	-	-	-	-	45	4th	3
1973	500cc	Yamaha-Japan	YZR500 0W20	FRA; 1	AUT; 1	GER; DNF	NAT -	IOM -	-	-	-	-	-	-	-	-	30	7th	2
