= Werner Pfirter =

- Nationality: (Switzerland) Swiss
- Born: 19 December 1946; Pratteln, Switzerland
- Died: 24 September 1973 (aged 26); Lérida, Spain
Motorcycle racing career statistics
Grand Prix motorcycle racing
Active years	1970 - 1973
First race	1970 Isle of Man 250cc Lightweight TT
Last race	1973 250cc Spanish Grand Prix
Starts / Wins / Podiums / Poles / F. laps / Points; 24 / 0 / 2 / 0 / 0 / 124

Werner Pfirter (19 December 1946 – 24 September 1973) was a Swiss professional Grand Prix motorcycle road racer.

Born in Pratteln, Pfirter's most successful year was in 1971 when he finished in sixth place in the 350cc world championship. Pfirter was killed in a road accident near Lleida, Spain in 1973 while driving home from the Spanish Grand Prix.

== Grand Prix motorcycle racing results ==
**Position**	1	2	3	4	5	6	7	8	9	10
**Points**	15	12	10	8	6	5	4	3	2	1

(key) (Races in bold indicate pole position; races in italics indicate fastest lap)

Year	Class	Team	1	2	3	4	5	6	7	8	9	10	11	12	13	Points	Rank	Wins
1970	250cc	Yamaha	GER -	FRA -	YUG -	IOM; 22	NED -	BEL -	DDR -	CZE -	FIN -	ULS -	NAT -	ESP -		0	-	0
1970	350cc	Yamaha	GER -		YUG -	IOM; 38	NED -		DDR -	CZE -	FIN -	ULS -	NAT -	ESP -		0	-	0
1971	250cc	Yamaha	AUT -	GER -	IOM; 15	NED -	BEL -	DDR; 10	CZE -	SWE -	FIN -	ULS -	NAT -	ESP; 4		9	20th	0
1971	350cc	Yamaha	AUT; 2	GER; 6	IOM; 11	NED -		DDR; 5	CZE -	SWE -	FIN -	ULS -	NAT -	ESP; 3		33	6th	0
1972	250cc	Yamaha	GER; 8	FRA; 5	AUT; 6	NAT -	IOM; 5	YUG -	NED -	BEL -	DDR -	CZE; 9	SWE -	FIN -	ESP; 5	28	10th	0
1972	350cc	Yamaha	GER; 9	FRA -	AUT; 8	NAT; 10	IOM -	YUG -	NED -		DDR -	CZE; 5	SWE -	FIN -	ESP; 7	17	10th	0
1973	250cc	Yamaha	FRA -	AUT -	GER -		IOM -	YUG; 8	NED -	BEL; 8	CZE -	SWE -	FIN; 5	ESP; 4		20	13th	0
1973	350cc	Yamaha	FRA; 4	AUT -	GER -	NAT; 6	IOM -	YUG; 7	NED -		CZE -	SWE -	FIN -	ESP -		17	12th	0
