= Charlie Williams (motorcyclist) =

British motorcycle racer

- Nationality: British
Motorcycle racing career statistics
Grand Prix motorcycle racing
Active years	1972 – 1976, 1980 – 1981
First race	1972 125cc Isle of Man Ultra-Lightweight TT
Last race	1981 350cc British Grand Prix
First win	1973 250cc Isle of Man Lightweight TT
Last win	1975 350cc Isle of Man Junior TT
Championships	0
Starts / Wins / Podiums / Poles / F. laps / Points; 11 / 3 / 5 / 0 / 2 / 133

Charlie Williams (born in Kelsall, Cheshire) is a former Grand Prix motorcycle road racer. His best season was in 1974 when he finished in tenth place in the 500cc world championship on a Yamaha motorcycle. Williams was a nine-time winner at the Isle of Man TT races, although only three of those victories counted towards the world championship. In 1980, he won the Formula II Class of the Formula TT world championship.

Since racing, Williams has remained a TT personality presenting the breakfast show every week day on Radio TT as well as joining the team for trackside commentary. He owns and has taken an active role in running the Chester store Everything But Bikes since retiring from TT racing.

== Motorcycle Grand Prix results ==
**Position**	1	2	3	4	5	6	7	8	9	10
**Points**	15	12	10	8	6	5	4	3	2	1

(key) (Races in bold indicate pole position)

Year	Class	Team	1	2	3	4	5	6	7	8	9	10	11	12	13	Points	Rank	Wins
1972	125cc	Yamaha	GER -	FRA -	AUT -	NAT -	IOM; 2	YUG -	NED -	BEL -	DDR -	TCH -	SWE -	FIN -	ESP -	12	15th	0
1972	250cc	Yamaha	GER -	FRA -	AUT -	NAT -	IOM; 4	YUG -	NED -	BEL -	DDR -	TCH -	SWE -	FIN -	ESP -	8	20th	0
1972	350cc	Yamaha	GER -	FRA -	AUT -	NAT -	IOM; NC	YUG -	NED -		DDR -	CZE -	SWE -	FIN -	ESP -	0	–	0
1972	500cc	Yamaha	GER -	FRA -	AUT -	NAT -	IOM; 6	YUG -	NED -	BEL -	DDR -	TCH -	SWE -	FIN -	ESP -	5	29th	0
1973	125cc	Yamaha	FRA -	AUT -	GER -	NAT -	IOM; NC	YUG -	NED -	BEL -	CZE -	SWE -	FIN -	ESP -		0	–	0
1973	250cc	Yamaha	FRA -	AUT -	GER -		IOM; 1	YUG -	NED -	BEL -	TCH -	SWE -	FIN -	ESP -		15	16th	1
1973	350cc	Yamaha	FRA -	AUT -	GER -	NAT -	IOM; NC	YUG -	NED -		CZE -	SWE -	FIN -	ESP -		0	–	0
1973	500cc	Yamaha	FRA -	AUT -	GER -		IOM; NC	YUG -	NED -	BEL -	CZE -	SWE -	FIN -	ESP -		0	–	0
1974	250cc	Yamaha		GER -		NAT -	IOM; 1	NED -	BEL -	SWE -	FIN -	TCH -	YUG -	ESP -		15	12th	1
1974	350cc	Yamaha	FRA -	GER -	AUT -	NAT -	IOM; NC	NED -		SWE -	FIN -		YUG -	ESP -		0	–	0
1974	500cc	Yamaha	FRA -	GER -	AUT -	NAT -	IOM; 2	NED; 5	BEL -	SWE -	FIN -	TCH -				18	10th	0
1975	250cc	Yamaha	FRA -	ESP -		GER -	NAT -		IOM; NC	NED -	BEL -	SWE -	FIN -	CZE -	YUG -	0	–	0
1975	350cc	Yamaha	FRA -	ESP -		GER -	NAT -		IOM; 1	NED -	BEL -	SWE -	FIN -	TCH -	YUG -	15	14th	1
1975	500cc	Yamaha	FRA -		AUT -	GER -	NAT -		IOM; 7	NED -	BEL -	SWE -	FIN -	TCH -		4	28th	0
1976	250cc	Yamaha	FRA -		NAT -	YUG -	IOM; NC	NED -	BEL -	SWE -	FIN -	CZE -	GER -	ESP -		0	–	0
1976	350cc	Yamaha	FRA -	AUT -	NAT -	YUG -	IOM; NC	NED -			FIN -	CZE -	GER -	ESP -		0	–	0
1976	500cc	Yamaha	FRA -	AUT -	NAT -		IOM; NC	NED -	BEL -	SWE -	FIN -	CZE -	GER -			0	–	0
1980	250cc	Yamaha	NAT -	ESP -	FRA -	YUG -	NED -	BEL -	FIN -	GBR; 9	CZE -	GER -				2	30th	0
1981	350cc	Yamaha	ARG -	AUT -	GER -	NAT -	YUG -	NED -	GBR; 5	CZE -						6	20th	0

Sporting positions
Preceded by Alan Jackson jr.	TT Formula Two World Champion; 1980	Succeeded by Tony Rutter
