= 1972 Grand Prix motorcycle racing season =

Sports season

1972 F.I.M. Grand Prix motorcycle racing season

Seasons
- ← 1971 1973 →

The 1972 Grand Prix motorcycle racing season was the 24th F.I.M. Road Racing World Championship Grand Prix season. The season consisted of twelve Grand Prix races in six classes: 500cc, 350cc, 250cc, 125cc, 50cc and Sidecars 500cc. It began on 30 April, with West German Grand Prix and ended with Spanish Grand Prix on 23 September.

== Season summary ==
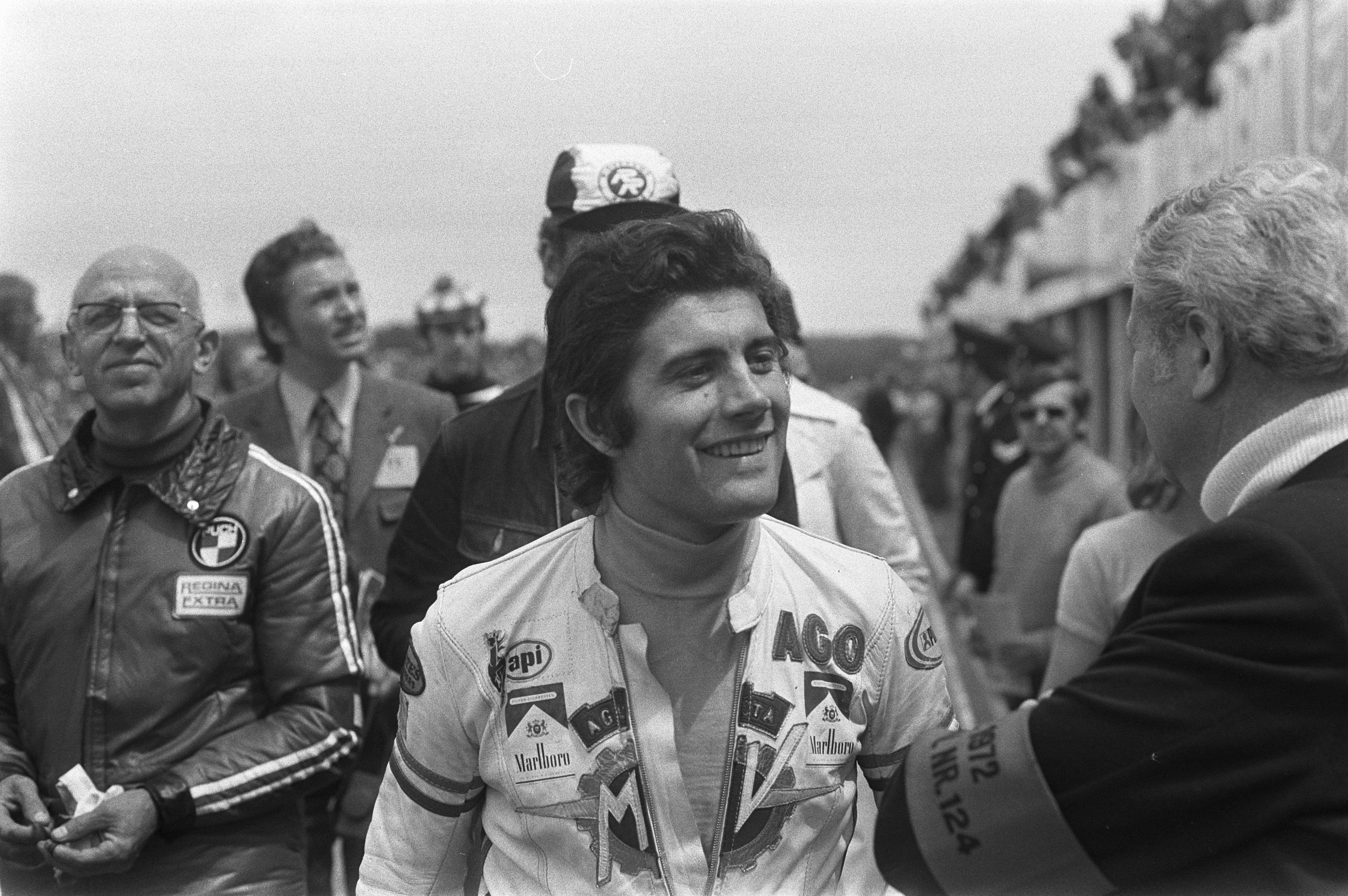
Giacomo Agostini at the 1972 Dutch TT.

Giacomo Agostini's reign as the 500cc World Champion continued in 1972 with the MV Agusta rider winning his seventh consecutive title by claiming a record 11 victories in the 13-round series. His record stood until 1997 when Mick Doohan won twelve races. Agostini's MV Agusta teammate, Alberto Pagani finished second to Agostini in most of the rounds. By 1972, MV Agusta was the last major manufacturer to compete in the FIM World Championships using four-stroke motorcycles, as advancements in two-stroke engine technology by Japanese manufacturers were becoming evident. Kawasaki returned to the World Championships, providing machines for Dave Simmonds and Eric Offenstadt. The Yamaha factory won its first-ever 500cc Grand Prix race at the season ending Spanish Grand Prix at Jarama when Chas Mortimer won the race after Agostini sat out the event after already winning the championship,

Giacomo Agostini (1) in action during the 1972 350cc Dutch TT.

The 350 class proved to be more of a challenge for Agostini where he faced strong opposition from Yamaha rider, Jarno Saarinen. At the season-opening German Grand Prix held at the daunting Nürburgring race track, Saarinen defeated Agostini for the first time in a head-to-head race. It also marked the first time that Agostini had lost a race since the 1967 Canadian Grand Prix. Saarinen also won the 350cc French Grand Prix and scored a double victory at the Czechoslovak Grand Prix with victories in both the 250cc and 350cc classes. Agostini would eventually prevail to clinch the 350 title with six victories however, the threat from Saarinen's two stroke Yamaha was so strong that the previously dominant MV Agusta factory was forced to produce a new 350cc motorcycle for Agostini.

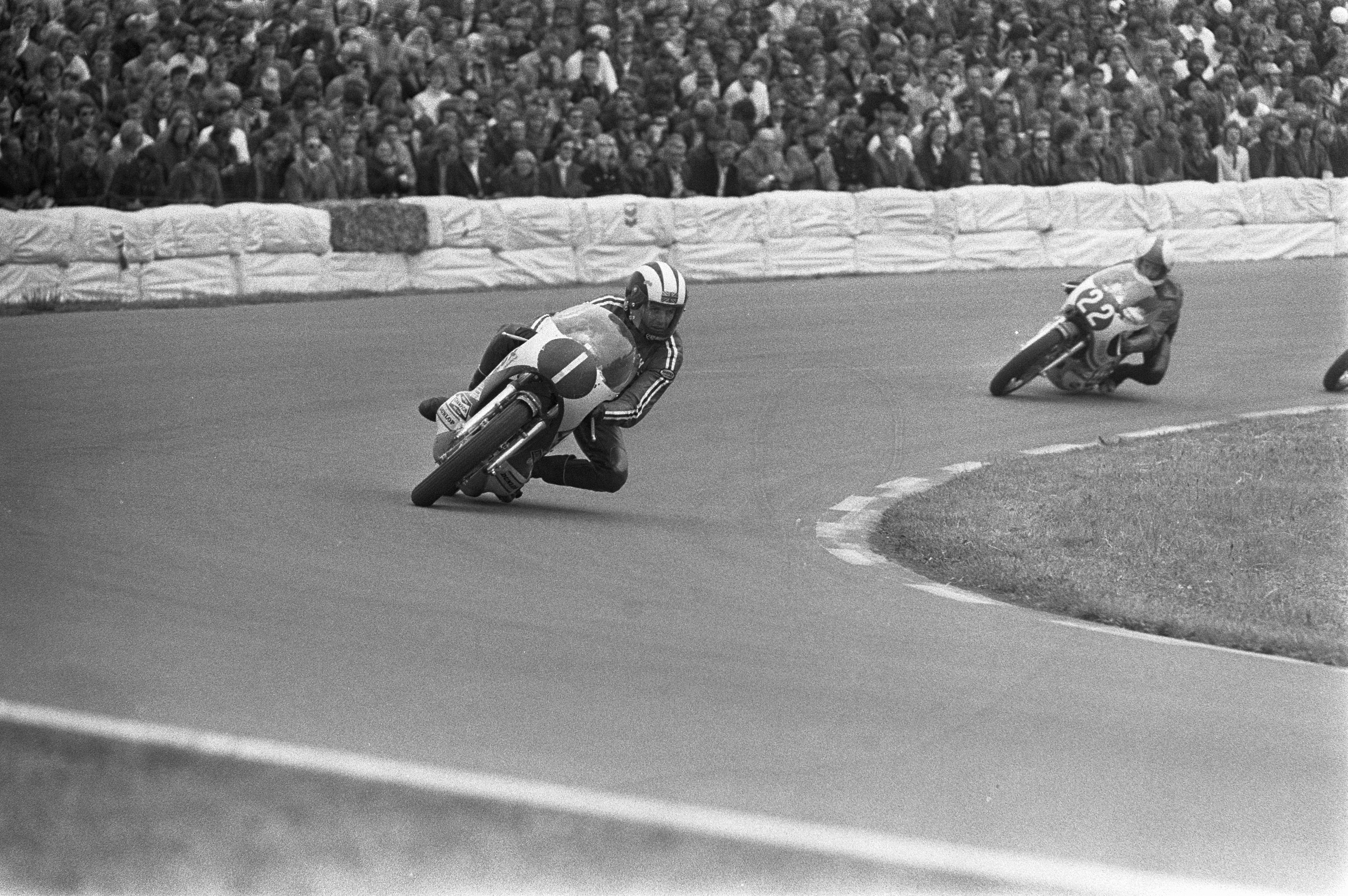
Phil Read (1) leads Jarno Saarinen (22) during the 1972 250cc Dutch TT.

The 1972 250cc World Championship began with four different race-winners, (Hideo Kanaya (Yamaha), Phil Read (Yamaha), Börje Jansson (Maico), and Renzo Pasolini (Aermacchi), however Saarinen led Pasolini in the championship points race due to his consistent results. After Barry Sheene was injured at the 250cc Nations Grand Prix, his specially made, factory-supported Yamaha YZ635 was given to Saarinen. Saarinen rode the special Yamaha to win four of the last six Grand Prix races to clinch the 250cc World Championship by a single point over Pasolini. Angel Nieto claimed a double, winning the 125cc and 50cc championships for Derbi before the Spanish factory announced its withdrawal from Grand Prix racing.

This would be the final season for the East German Grand Prix as a championship race, as SED officials, troubled by fans singing Das Lied der Deutschen (the West German national anthem) after Dieter Braun's victory the previous season, limited entries to only Eastern Bloc nations beginning in 1973. On 23 October 1972, Dave Simmonds was killed in a fire caused by an exploding gas cylinder in a caravan owned by fellow racer Jack Findlay while attending a non-championship motorcycle race at Rungis near Paris.

=== Agostini's Isle of Man TT boycott ===
When Gilberto Parlotti died in an accident while competing in the 1972 Isle of Man TT, Agostini announced he would never again compete in the event, as he considered the 37.73-mile circuit unsafe for world championship competition. At the time, the Isle of Man TT was the most prestigious race on the international motorcycle racing calendar, and his stature as the reigning World Champion gave the announcement an immense impact on the sport.

Agostini's decision to boycott the event had far-reaching consequences for the TT and would lead to a walk-out of the top Grand Prix stars, many of whom resorted to severe criticism of the organisation and safety at the event, with people such as Phil Read in the vanguard of the critics. In response, the FIM decided that the Isle of Man TT would be withdrawn from the World Championship calendar after the 1976 races. The British round of the FIM championship was held at Silverstone Circuit on the mainland from 1977 onwards. Agostini maintained that he did not object to the event itself, but that he only opposed riders being contractually required to enter such a dangerous race as part of a World Championship campaign.

== 1972 Grand Prix season calendar ==
Round	Date	Grand Prix	Circuit	50cc winner	125cc winner	250cc winner	350cc winner	500cc winner	Sidecars 500cc winner	Report
1	30 April	(West Germany) German Grand Prix	Nürburgring Nordschleife	(Netherlands) Jan de Vries	(Italy) Gilberto Parlotti	(Japan) Hideo Kanaya	(Finland) Jarno Saarinen	(Italy) Giacomo Agostini	(Germany) Schauzu / Kalauch	Report
2	7 May	(France) French Grand Prix	Charade		(Italy) Gilberto Parlotti	(United Kingdom) Phil Read	(Finland) Jarno Saarinen	(Italy) Giacomo Agostini	(Germany) Luthringshauser / Cusnik	Report
3	14 May	(Austria) Austrian Grand Prix	Salzburgring		(Spain) Angel Nieto	(Sweden) Börje Jansson	(Italy) Giacomo Agostini	(Italy) Giacomo Agostini	(Germany) Enders / Engelhardt	Report
4	21 May	(Italy) Nations Grand Prix	Imola	(Netherlands) Jan de Vries	(Spain) Angel Nieto	(Italy) Renzo Pasolini	(Italy) Giacomo Agostini	(Italy) Giacomo Agostini		Report
5	9 June	Isle of Man TT	Snaefell Mountain		(United Kingdom) Chas Mortimer	(United Kingdom) Phil Read	(Italy) Giacomo Agostini	(Italy) Giacomo Agostini	(Germany) Schauzu / Kalauch	Report
6	18 June	(Socialist Federal Republic of Yugoslavia) Yugoslavian Grand Prix	Opatija	(Netherlands) Jan Bruins	(Sweden) Kent Andersson	(Italy) Renzo Pasolini	(Hungary) János Drapál	(Italy) Alberto Pagani		Report
7	24 June	(Netherlands) Dutch TT	Assen	(Spain) Angel Nieto	(Spain) Angel Nieto	(United Kingdom) Rodney Gould	(Italy) Giacomo Agostini	(Italy) Giacomo Agostini	(Germany) Enders / Engelhardt	Report
8	2 July	(Belgium) Belgian Grand Prix	Spa-Francorchamps	(Spain) Angel Nieto	(Spain) Angel Nieto	(Finland) Jarno Saarinen		(Italy) Giacomo Agostini	(Germany) Enders / Engelhardt	Report
9	9 July	(East Germany) Grand Prix of the DRG	Sachsenring	(Netherlands) Theo Timmer	(Sweden) Börje Jansson	(Finland) Jarno Saarinen	(United Kingdom) Phil Read	(Italy) Giacomo Agostini		Report
10	16 July	(Czechoslovakia) Czechoslovak Grand Prix	Brno		(Sweden) Börje Jansson	(Finland) Jarno Saarinen	(Finland) Jarno Saarinen	(Italy) Giacomo Agostini	(Germany) Enders / Engelhardt	Report
11	23 July	(Sweden) Swedish Grand Prix	Anderstorp	(Netherlands) Jan de Vries	(Spain) Angel Nieto	(United Kingdom) Rodney Gould	(Italy) Giacomo Agostini	(Italy) Giacomo Agostini		Report
12	30 July	(Finland) Finnish Grand Prix	Imatra		(Sweden) Kent Andersson	(Finland) Jarno Saarinen	(Italy) Giacomo Agostini	(Italy) Giacomo Agostini	(United Kingdom) Vincent / Casey	Report
13	23 September	(Spain) Spanish Grand Prix	Montjuïc	(Spain) Angel Nieto	(Sweden) Kent Andersson	(Italy) Renzo Pasolini	(Switzerland) Bruno Kneubühler	(United Kingdom) Chas Mortimer		Report

== Final standings ==
=== Scoring system ===
Points were awarded to the top ten finishers in each race. Only the best of five races were counted on 50cc and Sidecars championships, while in the 125cc, 250cc, 350cc and 500cc championships, the best of seven races were counted.

Position	1st	2nd	3rd	4th	5th	6th	7th	8th	9th	10th
Points	15	12	10	8	6	5	4	3	2	1

==== 500cc final standings ====
Pos	Rider	Machine	GER (Germany)	FRA (France)	AUT (Austria)	NAC (Italy)	MAN (Isle of Man)	YUG (Socialist Federal Republic of Yugoslavia)	HOL (Netherlands)	BEL (Belgium)	DDR (East Germany)	TCH (Czechoslovakia)	SWE (Sweden)	FIN (Finland)	ESP (Spain)	Pts
1	(Italy) Giacomo Agostini	MV Agusta	1	1	1	1	1	Ret	1	1	1	1	1	**1**		**105** (165)
2	(Italy) Alberto Pagani	MV Agusta	2			2	2	1	2	2				2		**87**
3	(Switzerland) Bruno Kneubühler	Yamaha	11	4	8	5		Ret	3		4	3	7	Ret	**4**	**54** (57)
4	(United Kingdom) Rodney Gould	Yamaha								3	2	4	2	3		**52**
5	(Sweden) Bo Granath	Husqvarna	6	6	3	Ret		5	Ret	5	6	7	3	12	Ret	**47** (51)
6	(United Kingdom) Chas Mortimer	Yamaha						2	5	Ret	5	Ret	8	Ret	1	**42**
7	(United Kingdom) Dave Simmonds	Kawasaki	4	Ret					4	Ret			4	5	2	**42**
8	(Australia) Jack Findlay	Jada-Suzuki	7	Ret		Ret	Ret	Ret	6	Ret	Ret	2	Ret	Ret	3	**31**
9	(United Kingdom) Billie Nelson	Honda / Yamaha / Paton	8	7		Ret		Ret	9	8		5	9	4	6	**31** (33)
10	(New Zealand) Kim Newcombe	König	3	10					12	Ret	3	Ret	5	Ret		**27**
11	(Italy) Guido Mandracci	Suzuki		8	2	Ret		4	10	Ret						**24**
12	(France) Christian Bourgeois	Yamaha	Ret	2	5				Ret	9						**20**
13	(Netherlands) Rob Bron	Suzuki	Ret	3	4			Ret								**18**
14	(Sweden) Sven-Olof Gunnarsson	Kawasaki	12	Ret				Ret			Ret	6	6	Ret	5	**16**
15	(United Kingdom) Jerry Lancaster	Yamaha / Suzuki	15	Ret		Ret		9	7	7			11	7		**14**
16	(Germany) Paul Eickleberg	König	30					3	8				Ret	Ret		**13**
17	(United Kingdom) Mick Grant	Kawasaki					3									**10**
17	(Italy) Bruno Spaggiari	Ducati				3										**10**
19	(Italy) Gianpiero Zubani	Kawasaki			6	Ret		7								**9**
20	(Italy) Sergio Baroncini	Ducati			9	7		8				14				**9**
21	(Germany) Lothar John	Yamaha / Suzuki	10			8			11	10		8	18	10		**9**
22	(United Kingdom) Kevin Cowley	Seeley-Matchless					4									**8**
22	(Japan) Hideo Kanaya	Yamaha International								4						**8**
22	(United Kingdom) Paul Smart	Ducati				4										**8**
25	(Netherlands) Piet Van der Wal	Kawasaki							Ret	13	8				7	**7**
26	(Germany) Ernst Hiller	König / Kawasaki	5						Ret	Ret						**6**
26	(France) André Pogolotti	Suzuki		5		Ret									Ret	**6**
26	(United Kingdom) Derek Chatterton	Yamaha					5									**6**
29	(France) Eric Offenstadt	Kawasaki / Yamaha	Ret	Ret	Ret	Ret		Ret	Ret	6	Ret	Ret				**5**
29	(Scotland) Charlie Dobson	Kawasaki	Ret					6					Ret	Ret		**5**
29	(Germany) Klaus Huber	Kawasaki	Ret			6										**5**
29	(Finland) Pentti Korhonen	Yamaha												6		**5**
29	(United Kingdom) Charlie Williams	Yamaha					6									**5**
34	(Sweden) Kurt-Ivan Carlsson	Yamaha	14	9	Ret				13	12	Ret	10		Ret	9	**5**
35	(Austria) Alois Maxwald	Rotax			Ret						7	11				**4**
35	(Italy) Silvano Bertarelli	Kawasaki / Paton			7	Ret										**4**
35	(Wales) Selwyn Griffiths	Matchless					7									**4**
38	(United Kingdom) Derek Lee	Suzuki	Ret			Ret								8	Ret	**3**
38	(United Kingdom) Clive Brown	Suzuki					8									**3**
38	(Italy) Getulio Marcaccini	Aermacchi													8	**3**
38	(United Kingdom) Paul Cott	Seeley					8									**3**
42	(Italy) Carlo Marelli	Paton / Kawasaki			10	9										**3**
43	(Hungary) Arpád Juhos	Metisse-Matchless / Aermacchi									9	15				**2**
43	(Japan) Ken Araoka	Kawasaki	9	Ret	Ret	Ret										**2**
43	(Sweden) Johnny Bengtsson	Husqvarna-Proto											Ret	9		**2**
43	(Finland) Seppo Kangasniemi	Yamaha										9				**2**
47	(Italy) Roberto Gallina	Paton			Ret	Ret		10							Ret	**1**
47	(United Kingdom) Maurice Hawthorne	Kawasaki	Ret					Ret							10	**1**
47	(Austria) Josef Özelt	Matchless									10	Ret				**1**
47	(Sweden) Ulf Nilsson	Suzuki											10			**1**
47	(United Kingdom) Charlie Sanby	Suzuki					10									**1**
52	(United Kingdom) Ron Chandler	Kawasaki		13					Ret	11						**0**
53	(Finland) Kai Kuparinen	Suzuki / Kawasaki						Ret	Ret		Ret		19	11		**0**
54	(Germany) Ted Janssen	Suzuki	27										Ret		11	**0**
55	(Austria) Michael Schmid	Yamaha	28								11	Ret				**0**
56	(Australia) Terry Dennehy	Honda			Ret			11					Ret			**0**
57	(Italy) Giordano Mongardi	Ducati			11	Ret										**0**
58	(France) Christian Léon	Kawasaki		11												**0**
58	(Northern Ireland) Billy McCosh	Suzuki					11									**0**
60	(Switzerland) Gyula Marsovszky	Linto	Ret	Ret		Ret			Ret		Ret	12			Ret	**0**
61	(United Kingdom) Steve Ellis	Yamaha	Ret	12					Ret	Ret			Ret	Ret		**0**
62	(Sweden) Morgan Radberg	Monark										Ret	12			**0**
63	(Uruguay) Gustavo Cerdeña	Suzuki						12								**0**
63	(United Kingdom) John Hughes	Matchless			12											**0**
63	(United Kingdom) Stan Woods	Suzuki					12									**0**
66	(Switzerland) Heinz Schmid	Suzuki	18		Ret		Ret					13				**0**
67	(New Zealand) Keith Turner	Suzuki	13	Ret		Ret		Ret	Ret	Ret	Ret	Ret	Ret	Ret		**0**
68	(Switzerland) Jean Campiche	Linto	Ret					13		Ret						**0**
69	(Sweden) Agne Carlsson	Husqvarna											13			**0**
69	(United Kingdom) Jeff Wade	Yamaha					13									**0**
71	(Finland) Kaarlo Koivuniemi	Kawasaki	20	14								16	16	Ret		**0**
72	(Sweden) Börge Andersson	Honda	23										14			**0**
73	(Belgium) Guy Cooremans	Kawasaki								14						**0**
73	(United Kingdom) Roger Nichols	Suzuki					14									**0**
75	(United Kingdom) George Fogarty	Cunningham-Suzuki					15									**0**
75	(France) Jean-Paul Passet	Kawasaki		15												**0**
75	(Belgium) Jerôme van Haeltert	Kawasaki								15						**0**
75	(Sweden) Sture Wass	Kawasaki											15			**0**
79	(Germany) Hans-Otto Butenuth	BMW	Ret	16												**0**
79	(Switzerland) Walter Rüngg	Aermacchi	16		Ret											**0**
81	(Northern Ireland) Garry Mateer	Norton					16									**0**
82	(Austria) Werner Bergold	Kawasaki			Ret							17				**0**
83	(United Kingdom) Pete Elmore	Petty-Norton					17									**0**
83	(France) Jacques Roca	Suzuki		17												**0**
83	(Germany) Hans-Jürgen Rothbrust	Yamaha	17													**0**
83	(Denmark) Claus Tarum	Honda											17			**0**
87	(Finland) Anssi Resko	Kawasaki										18		Ret		**0**
88	(United Kingdom) Tom Dickie	Cowles-Matchless					18									**0**
89	(Germany) Horst Dzierzawa	Yamaha	19												Ret	**0**
90	(United Kingdom) Brian Lee	Aermacchi					19									**0**
91	(Sweden) Arne Andersson	Suzuki											20			**0**
92	(United Kingdom) Ken Tilley	Norton					20									**0**
93	(Germany) Kurt-Harald Florin	König	21	Ret					Ret				Ret	Ret		**0**
94	(United Kingdom) Roger Bowler	Mularny					21									**0**
95	(Switzerland) Werner Giger	Kawasaki	22	Ret												**0**
96	(United Kingdom) Raymond Ashcroft	Yamaha					22									**0**
97	(United Kingdom) Hugh Evans	Kawasaki					23									**0**
98	(Germany) Udo Kochanski	BMW	24													**0**
98	(United Kingdom) Grahan Penny	Honda					24									**0**
100	(Germany) Willi Bertsch	Kawasaki	25						Ret							**0**
101	(United Kingdom) Ken Kay	Seeley					25									**0**
102	(Sweden) Sten-Gunnar Jansson	Kawasaki	26													**0**
102	(Isle of Man) Fred Walton	Velocette-Metisse					26									**0**
104	(United Kingdom) Ron Baylie	Triumph					27									**0**
105	(United Kingdom) Walter Dawson	Yamaha					28									**0**
106	(Germany) Otto Labitzke	Honda	29													**0**
106	(United Kingdom) Chris Neve	Seeley					29									**0**
108	(United Kingdom) Tom Loughridge	Crooks-Suzuki					30									**0**
109	(Northern Ireland) Abe Alexander	Seeley					31									**0**
110	(United Kingdom) Jim Ashton	Seeley					32									**0**
111	(United Kingdom) Tom Waterer	Norton					33									**0**
112	(United Kingdom) Ernie Johnson	Suzuki					34									**0**
113	(United Kingdom) Geoff Barry	Oakley-Seeley					35									**0**
–	(Austria) Karl Auer	Kawasaki	Ret		Ret	Ret					Ret	Ret	Ret	Ret		**0**
–	(United States) Cliff Carr	Kawasaki	Ret	Ret		Ret										**0**
–	(France) André-Luc Appietto	Kawasaki		Ret	Ret					Ret						**0**
–	(United Kingdom) Godfrey Nash	Honda	Ret		Ret				Ret							**0**
–	(Czechoslovakia) Bohumil Staša	ČZ			Ret	Ret						Ret				**0**
–	(France) Gérard Debrock	Kawasaki		Ret						Ret						**0**
–	(Netherlands) Wil Hartog	Riemanoc-Yamaha	Ret						Ret							**0**
–	(Finland) Kari Lahtinen	Yamaha											Ret	Ret		**0**
–	(United Kingdom) Bob Biscardine	Norton					Ret									**0**
–	(United Kingdom) Jeff Boniface	Kettle-Norton					Ret									**0**
–	(Austria) Hans Braumandl	Rotax									Ret					**0**
–	(Australia) Peter Breingan	Honda	Ret													**0**
–	(Northern Ireland) Robert Browne	Norton					Ret									**0**
–	(Italy) Paolo Campanelli	Kawasaki				Ret										**0**
–	(United Kingdom) Doug Cash	Norton					Ret									**0**
–	(France) Gérard Chamard	Kawasaki		Ret												**0**
–	(France) Gérard Chaperon	Seeley			Ret											**0**
–	(United Kingdom) Eric Clark	Seeley											Ret			**0**
–	(Australia) John Dodds	Yamaha								Ret						**0**
–	(United Kingdom) Derek Filler	Seeley					Ret									**0**
–	(United Kingdom) Dave Foulkes	Norton					Ret									**0**
–	(Germany) Rudolf Fröhling	Honda	Ret													**0**
–	(United Kingdom) Bill Fulton	Stafford-Matchless					Ret									**0**
–	(United Kingdom) Roger Fursman	Seeley					Ret									**0**
–	(Scotland) Alex George	Kawasaki													Ret	**0**
–	(Canada) Andreas Georgeades	Honda / ASG	Ret													**0**
–	(United Kingdom) Roger Graham	Cowles-Matchless					Ret									**0**
–	(United Kingdom) Don Grant	Norton					Ret									**0**
–	(United Kingdom) Terry Grotefeld	Yamaha					Ret									**0**
–	(France) René Guilli	Kawasaki												Ret		**0**
–	(Northern Ireland) Billie Guthrie	Yamaha					Ret									**0**
–	(United Kingdom) David Harris	Yamaha		Ret												**0**
–	(United Kingdom) Don Harris	Yamaha					Ret									**0**
–	(United Kingdom) Keith Heckles	Norton					Ret									**0**
–	(Finland) Ari Heikkilä	AMC-Sachs												Ret		**0**
–	(United Kingdom) Bill Henderson	Seeley-Yamaha					Ret									**0**
–	(Germany) Gerhard Heukerott	Benelli	Ret													**0**
–	(United Kingdom) Ivan Hodgkinson	Granby-Suzuki					Ret									**0**
–	(Germany) Ewald Hüttlin	Kawasaki	Ret													**0**
–	(United Kingdom) Tony Jefferies	Suzuki					Ret									**0**
–	(Germany) Walter Kaletsch	Yamaha	Ret													**0**
–	(United Kingdom) Brian Kemp	Suzuki		Ret												**0**
–	(United Kingdom) Ray Knight	Hughes-Triumph					Ret									**0**
–	(United Kingdom) David Knowles	Matchless-Metisse					Ret									**0**
–	(Czechoslovakia) Jiří Král	ČZ										Ret				**0**
–	(United Kingdom) Alan Lawton	Norton					Ret									**0**
–	(Italy) Mario Lega	Ducati										Ret				**0**
–	(Finland) Pentti Lehtelä	Yamaha												Ret		**0**
–	(Italy) Giuseppe Mandolini	Aermacchi													Ret	**0**
–	(Germany) Hans-Josef Martinek	ČZ	Ret													**0**
–	(United Kingdom) Malcom Moffatt	Seeley					Ret									**0**
–	(United Kingdom) Brian Moses	Norton					Ret									**0**
–	(United Kingdom) Steve Moynihan	Norton					Ret									**0**
–	(South Africa) Garth Neveling	Norton					Ret									**0**
–	(Sweden) Lars Pahlsson	Suzuki											Ret			**0**
–	(Italy) Giovanni Perrone	Kawasaki				Ret										**0**
–	(United Kingdom) Norman Price	Mularny-Norton					Ret									**0**
–	(Czechoslovakia) Eman Quirenz	Jawa										Ret				**0**
–	(Northern Ireland) Robert Ramsey	Matchless					Ret									**0**
–	(United Kingdom) Phil Read	Yamaha		Ret												**0**
–	(Northern Ireland) Dudley Robinson	Padgett-Kawasaki					Ret									**0**
–	(United Kingdom) Nigel Rollason	Yamaha					Ret									**0**
–	(France) Roger Ruiz	Honda		Ret												**0**
–	(Sweden) Claes-Göran Samuelsson	Suzuki											Ret			**0**
–	(United Kingdom) Barry Smith	Kawasaki					Ret									**0**
–	(United Kingdom) John Stanley	Seeley					Ret									**0**
–	(Germany) Wolfgang Stephan	Honda	Ret													**0**
–	(Germany) Peter Stocksiefen	Honda	Ret													**0**
–	(Sweden) Anders Sundberg	Kawasaki											Ret			**0**
–	(United Kingdom) Roger Sutcliffe	Suzuki					Ret									**0**
–	(Northern Ireland) Brian Taggart	Norton					Ret									**0**
–	(France) Thierry Tchernine	Yamaha								Ret						**0**
–	(Germany) Jupp Tröblinger	König	Ret													**0**
–	(United Kingdom) Dennis Trollope	Yamaha					Ret									**0**
–	(Netherlands) Mike van Aken	König											Ret			**0**
–	(United Kingdom) Brian Warburton	Yamaha					Ret									**0**
–	(United Kingdom) Peter Williams	Arter Matchless					Ret									**0**
–	(United Kingdom) John Williams	Arter Matchless					Ret									**0**
–	(Italy) Benedetto Zambotti	Kawasaki				Ret										**0**
Pos	Rider	Bike	GER (Germany)	FRA (France)	AUT (Austria)	NAC (Italy)	MAN (Isle of Man)	YUG (Socialist Federal Republic of Yugoslavia)	HOL (Netherlands)	BEL (Belgium)	DDR (East Germany)	TCH (Czechoslovakia)	SWE (Sweden)	FIN (Finland)	ESP (Spain)	Pts
Sources: Notes: Clive Brown and Paul Cott set equal times in the 1972 Isle of Man Senior TT and tie for eighth place.

Colour	Result
Gold	Winner
Silver	Second place
Bronze	Third place
Green	Points classification
Blue	Non-points classification
Blue	Non-classified finish (NC)
Purple	Retired, not classified (Ret)
Red	Did not qualify (DNQ)
Red	Did not pre-qualify (DNPQ)
Black	Disqualified (DSQ)
White	Did not start (DNS)
White	Withdrew (WD)
White	Race cancelled (C)
Blank	Did not practice (DNP)
Blank	Did not arrive (DNA)
Blank	Excluded (EX)

**Bold** – Pole
Italics – Fastest Lap

=== 1972 350 cc Roadracing World Championship final standings ===
Place	Rider	Number	Country	Machine	Points	Wins
1	(Italy) Giacomo Agostini	1	Italy	MV Agusta	102	6
2	(Finland) Jarno Saarinen	2	Finland	Yamaha	89	3
3	(Italy) Renzo Pasolini		Italy	Aermacchi	78	0
4	(West Germany) Dieter Braun		West Germany	Yamaha	54	0
5	(United Kingdom) Phil Read	16	United Kingdom	MV Agusta	51	1
6	(Switzerland) Bruno Kneubühler		Switzerland	Yamaha	45	1
7	(Finland) Teuvo Lansivuori	10	Finland	Yamaha	42	0
7	(Hungary) János Drapál		Hungary	Yamaha	42	1
9	(Japan) Hideo Kanaya		Japan	Yamaha	41	0
10	(Australia) Jack Findlay	32	Australia	Yamaha	41	0

=== 1972 250 cc Roadracing World Championship final standings ===
Place	Rider	Number	Country	Machine	Points	Wins
1	(Finland) Jarno Saarinen	3	Finland	Yamaha	94	4
2	(Italy) Renzo Pasolini	28	Italy	Aermacchi	93	3
3	(United Kingdom) Rodney Gould	2	United Kingdom	Yamaha	88	2
4	(United Kingdom) Phil Read	1	United Kingdom	Yamaha	58	2
5	(Finland) Teuvo Lansivuori	22	Finland	Yamaha	46	0
6	(Australia) John Dodds	4	Australia	Yamaha	42	0
7	(Sweden) Kent Andersson	14	Sweden	Yamaha	39	0
8	(Sweden) Börje Jansson		Sweden	Maico	36	1
9	(Italy) Silvio Grassetti	7	Italy	MZ	30	0
10	(Switzerland) Werner Pfirter	20	Switzerland	Yamaha	28	0

=== 1972 125 cc Roadracing World Championship final standings ===
Place	Rider	Number	Country	Machine	Points	Wins
1	(Spain) Angel Nieto	1	Spain	Derbi	97	5
2	(Sweden) Kent Andersson	9	Sweden	Yamaha	87	3
3	(United Kingdom) Chas Mortimer	5	United Kingdom	Yamaha	87	1
4	(Sweden) Börje Jansson	3	Sweden	Maico	78	1
5	(Italy) Gilberto Parlotti	8	Italy	Morbidelli	52	2
6	(United Kingdom) Dave Simmonds	6	United Kingdom	Kawasaki	44	0
7	(Austria) Harald Bartol		Austria	Suzuki	37	0
8	(West Germany) Dieter Braun	4	West Germany	Maico	25	0
9	(Netherlands) Jos Schurgers		Netherlands	Bridgestone	23	0
10	(East Germany) Bernd Köhlar	23	East Germany	MZ	23	0

=== 1972 50 cc Roadracing World Championship final standings ===
Place	Rider	Number	Country	Machine	Points	Wins
1	(Spain) Angel Nieto	2	Spain	Derbi	69	3
2	(Netherlands) Jan de Vries	1	Netherlands	Kreidler	69	3
3	(Netherlands) Theo Timmer		Netherlands	Jamathi	50	1
4	(Netherlands) Jan Bruins	10	Netherlands	Kreidler	39	1
5	(Italy) Otello Buscherini		Italy	Malanca	32	0
6	(Austria) Hans Hummel		Austria	Kreidler	26	0
7	(Austria) Harald Bartol		Austria	Kreidler	26	0
8	(Netherlands) Jan Huberts		Netherlands	Kreidler	25	0
9	(West Germany) Rudolf Kunz	4	West Germany	Kreidler	17	0
10	(Spain) Benjamin Grau		Spain	Derbi	12	0
