= Jan Bruins =

Dutch motorcycle racer (1940–1997)

- Nationality: Dutch
Motorcycle racing career statistics
Grand Prix motorcycle racing
Active years	1970 - 1975
First race	1970 50cc Dutch TT
Last race	1975 50cc West German Grand Prix
First win	1972 50cc Yugoslavian Grand Prix
Last win	1972 50cc Yugoslavian Grand Prix
Team	Kreidler
Championships	0
Starts / Wins / Podiums / Poles / F. laps / Points; 15 / 1 / 3 / 0 / 0 / 97

Jan Bruins (27 May 1940, in Deventer – 16 April 1997) was a former Grand Prix motorcycle road racer from the Netherlands. He had his best year in 1972 when he won the 50cc Yugoslavian Grand Prix, and finished the season in fourth place.
