= Gilberto Parlotti =

Italian motorcycle racer

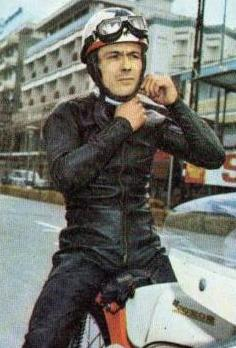
- Nationality: Italian
Motorcycle racing career statistics
Grand Prix motorcycle racing
Active years	1969–1972
First race	1969 50cc Spanish Grand Prix
Last race	1972 125cc Isle of Man TT
First win	1970 125cc Czechoslovak Grand Prix
Last win	1972 125cc French Grand Prix
Team(s)	Benelli, Derbi, Ducati, Morbidelli, Morini, Tomos
Starts / Wins / Podiums / Poles / F. laps / Points; 19 / 4 / 12 / N/A / 8 / 186

Gilberto Parlotti (17 September 1940 – 9 June 1972) was an Italian professional motorcycle racer competing in the FIM World Championship between 1969 and 1972. He competed for the Benelli, Derbi, Morbidelli and Tomos factories.

== Life ==
Parlotti was born in Zero Branco, Treviso, Italy. After winning the first two 125cc races of the 1972 Grand Prix motorcycle racing season in West Germany and France, Parlotti decided to race at the 1972 Isle of Man TT Races to take advantage of his main championship rival Angel Nieto's absence from the Isle of Man Mountain Course.

While lying in first place on the second lap during the 1972 125cc Ultra-Lightweight TT race held in heavy rain, Parlotti crashed his 125cc Morbidelli motorcycle at the Verandah section on the A18 Mountain Road and died from his injuries.

The death of Parlotti helped bring about the end of the Isle of Man TT Races as a world championship event. After his death, his close friend Giacomo Agostini announced he would never again race at the Isle of Man TT Races because he considered it too unsafe to be a part of the FIM World Motorcycle Championship calendar. At the time, the Isle of Man TT was the most prestigious race on the world championship calendar. Other top riders joined his boycott of the event and by 1976, the event was dropped from the Grand Prix championship schedule. From 1973 any weather conditions that would not allow a rescue helicopter to take-off would lead to the race start being delayed or cancelled at any Isle of Man TT Race.

== Motorcycle Grand Prix results ==
Points system from 1969 to 1987:

**Position**	1	2	3	4	5	6	7	8	9	10
**Points**	15	12	10	8	6	5	4	3	2	1

(key) (Races in bold indicate pole position; races in italics indicate fastest lap)

Year	Class	Team	1	2	3	4	5	6	7	8	9	10	11	12	13	Points	Rank	Wins
1969	50cc	Tomos	ESP; 4	GER; 5	FRA; 4	IOM -	NED; 8	BEL; 16	DDR; 9	TCH; 7	FIN -	ULS -	NAT -	YUG -		31	6th	0
1969	250cc	Benelli	ESP -	GER -	FRA -	IOM -	NED -	BEL -	DDR -	TCH -	FIN -	ULS -	NAT -	YUG; 2		12	15th	0
1970	50cc	Tomos	GER; 3	FRA; Ret	YUG -	IOM -	NED; 6	BEL -	DDR -		FIN -	ULS -	NAT -	ESP -		15	9th	0
1970	125cc	Morbidelli	GER -		YUG -	IOM -	NED -		DDR -	TCH; 1	FIN -	ULS -	NAT; Ret	ESP -		15	11th	1
1971	50cc	Derbi	AUT -	GER -	IOM -	NED -	BEL -	DDR -		SWE -	FIN; 2	ULS -	NAT; 3	ESP; Ret		22	8th	0
1971	125cc	Morbidelli	AUT; 2	GER; 2	IOM -	NED; Ret	BEL; Ret	DDR; Ret	TCH; Ret	SWE; DNQ	FIN -	ULS -	NAT; 1	ESP; Ret		39	8th	1
1972	125cc	Morbidelli	GER; 1	FRA; 1	AUT; 2	NAT; 3	IOM; Ret	YUG -	NED -	BEL -	DDR -	TCH -	SWE -	FIN -	ESP -	52	5th	2
