= Börje Jansson =

Swedish motorcycle racer

- Nationality: (Sweden) Swedish
- Born: 10 November 1942 (age 84); Örebro, Sweden
Motorcycle racing career statistics
Grand Prix motorcycle racing
Active years	1969 - 1973
First race	1969 250cc Spanish Grand Prix
Last race	1973 125cc Spanish Grand Prix
First win	1972 250cc Austrian Grand Prix
Last win	1973 125cc Swedish Grand Prix
Team	Maico
Championships	0
Starts / Wins / Podiums / Poles / F. laps / Points; 61 / 4 / 25 / 0 / 0 / 382

Börje Jansson (born 10 November 1942) is a former Grand Prix motorcycle road racer from Sweden. His best years were in 1971 and 1972, when he finished third in the 125cc world championship riding for the Maico factory racing team. He won the 1972 125cc East German Grand Prix, marking the first Grand Prix road racing victory for the German motorcycle manufacturer. Jansson won four Grand Prix races in his career. Jansson is the only rider in history to win a Grand Prix riding the Derbi 250 twin (1972 Austrian Grand Prix at the Salzburgring), out of only two races with the Spanish machine.

== Grand Prix motorcycle racing results ==
Points system from 1969 onwards:

**Position**	1	2	3	4	5	6	7	8	9	10
**Points**	15	12	10	8	6	5	4	3	2	1

(key) (Races in bold indicate pole position; races in italics indicate fastest lap)

Year	Class	Team	1	2	3	4	5	6	7	8	9	10	11	12	13	Points	Rank	Wins
1969	125cc	Maico	ESP -	GER; 9	FRA -	IOM -	NED -	BEL -	DDR; 9	CZE -	FIN -		NAT -	YUG -		4	40th	0
1969	250cc	Yamaha	ESP; 3	GER -	FRA; 10	IOM -	NED; 8	BEL -	DDR; 6	CZE -	FIN; 3	ULS -	NAT; 4	YUG; 4		45	5th	0
1970	125cc	Maico	GER -	FRA; 2	YUG; 4	IOM; 2	NED; 6	BEL; 3	DDR; 3	CZE; 5	FIN -		NAT -	ESP; 3		62	3rd	0
1970	250cc	Yamaha	GER -	FRA -	YUG; 5	IOM; 8	NED; 7	BEL; 3	DDR; 9	CZE -	FIN; 4	ULS -	NAT -	ESP; 10		34	5th	0
1971	125cc	Maico	AUT -	GER -	IOM; 2	NED; 3	BEL -	DDR; 3	CZE; 2	SWE; 2	FIN -		NAT; 4	ESP -		64	3rd	0
1971	250cc	Yamaha	AUT -	GER -	IOM; 9	NED -	BEL -	DDR -	CZE -	SWE; 8	FIN; 8	ULS -	NAT; 10	ESP -		9	21st	0
1972	50cc	Jamathi	GER; 3			NAT -		YUG -	NED -	BEL -	DDR -		SWE -		ESP -	10	12th	0
1972	125cc	Maico	GER; 3	FRA; 3	AUT; 4	NAT; 4	IOM -	YUG -	NED; 2	BEL; 4	DDR; 1	CZE; 1	SWE; 4	FIN -	ESP; 5	78	4th	2
1972	250cc	Derbi	GER -	FRA; 10	AUT; 1	NAT -	IOM -	YUG -	NED -							36	8th	1
1972	250cc	Maico								BEL; 6					ESP; 8	36	8th	1
1972	250cc	Yamaha									DDR -	CZE; 6	SWE; 10	FIN; 5		36	8th	1
1973	125cc	Maico	FRA; 2	AUT; 2	GER; 6	NAT -	IOM -	YUG; 1	NED -	BEL -	CZE -	SWE; 1	FIN; 3	ESP; 3		64	4th	1
1973	250cc	Yamaha	FRA; 5	AUT; 8	GER; 5		IOM -	YUG -	NED -	BEL -	CZE -	SWE; 8	FIN -	ESP -		12	18th	0
