= Czech motorcycle Grand Prix =

Motorcycle race held in the Czech Republic

Coordinates: 49°12′11″N 16°27′42″E

Czech Grand Prix

Grand Prix motorcycle racing
- Venue: Creditas Autodrom Brno (1965–1982, 1987–1991, 1993–2020, 2025–present)
- First race: 1965
- Most wins (rider): Giacomo Agostini, Max Biaggi, Valentino Rossi (7)
- Most wins (manufacturer): Honda (43)

The Czech motorcycle Grand Prix is a motorcycling event that is part of the Grand Prix motorcycle racing season. Before 1993, the race was known as the Czechoslovak motorcycle Grand Prix, while from 1993 to 2020, the race was known as the Czech Republic motorcycle Grand Prix. Since 1965, the race was a part of world Grand Prix series (between 1983 and 1986 race was held as a part of European Grand Prix series only).

Since 1987 the race was held on the newly built Brno Circuit, the historical track led through the streets of western parts of Brno and neighboring villages, such as Bosonohy and Žebětín. It was the most prestigious motor race in the country. Brno has also held the most motorcycle championship rounds in the sport's history after the TT Circuit Assen.

The event was not held between 2021 and 2024, but returned in the 2025 MotoGP World Championship season.

== Official names and sponsors ==
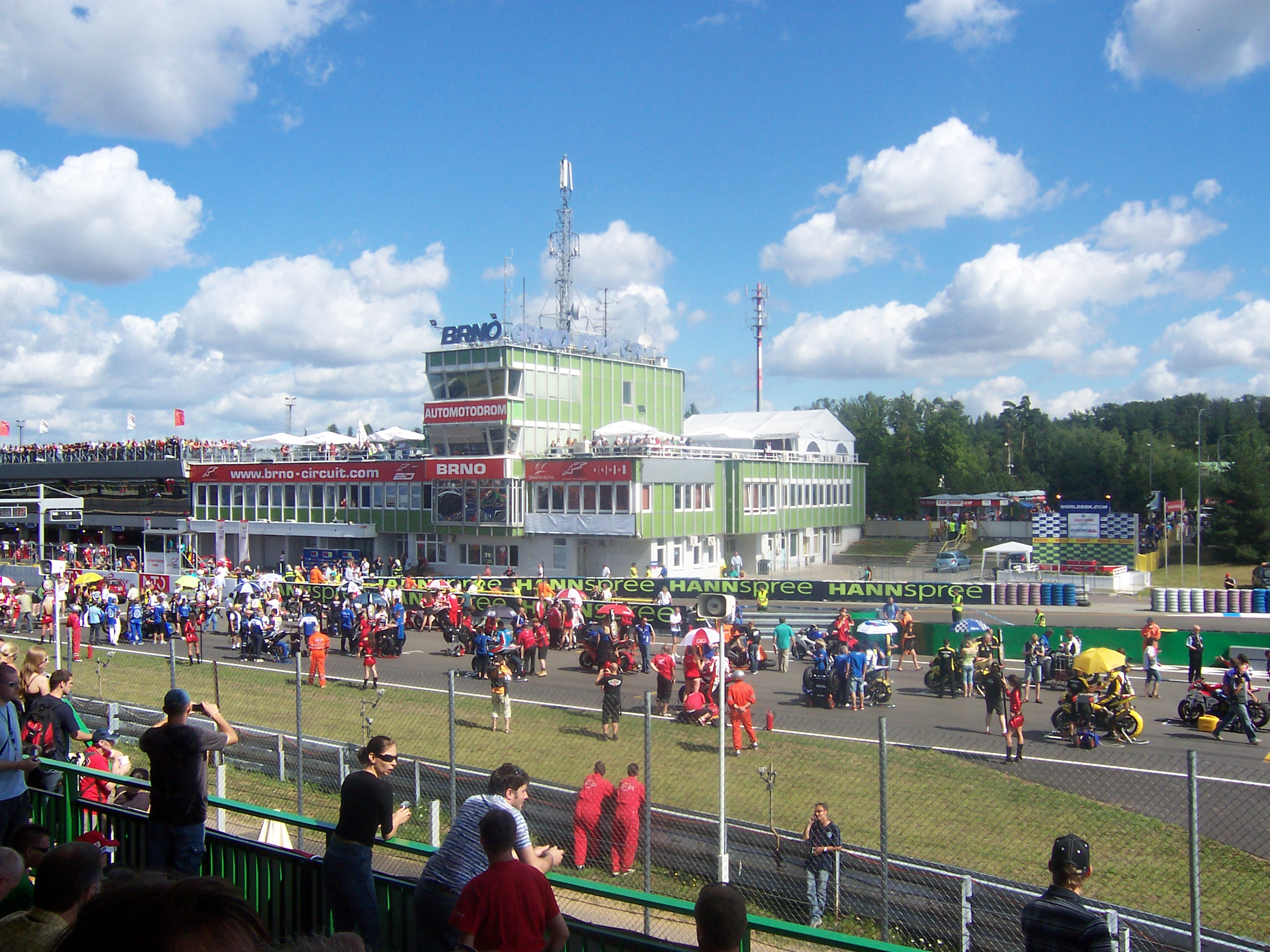
Starting grid on the Brno Circuit

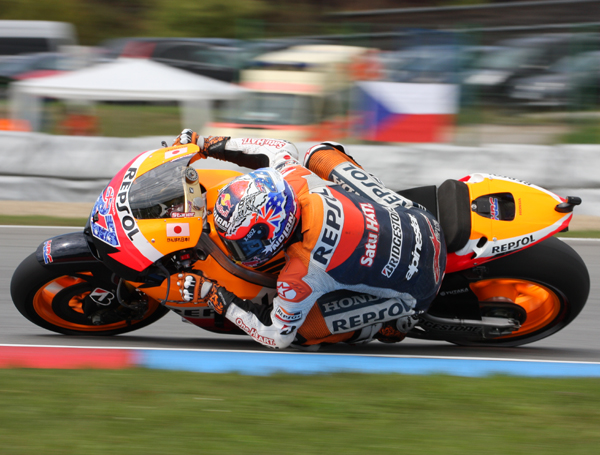
Casey Stoner at MotoGP Brno

- 1965–1966, 1970–1971: Velká Cena ČSSR (no official sponsor)
- 1968–1969: Velká Cena Ceskoslovenska (no official sponsor)
- 1972–1982: Grand Prix ČSSR (no official sponsor)
- 1987–1989: Grand Prix ČSSR-Brno (no official sponsor)
- 1990–1991: Grand Prix ČSFR-Brno (no official sponsor)
- 1993–1999: Grand Prix České republiky (no official sponsor)
- 2000–2006: Gauloises Grand Prix České republiky
- 2007–2011: Cardion AB Grand Prix České republiky
- 2012–2015: bwin Grand Prix České republiky
- 2016: HJC Helmets Grand Prix České republiky
- 2017–2020: Monster Energy Grand Prix České republiky
- 2025: Tissot Grand Prix of Czechia
- 2026: Monster Energy Grand Prix of Czechia

== Winners ==
=== Multiple winners (riders) ===
# Wins	Rider	Wins	
# Wins	Rider	Category	Years won
7	(Italy) Giacomo Agostini	500cc	1968, 1969, 1972, 1973
7	(Italy) Giacomo Agostini	350cc	1968, 1969, 1970
7	(Italy) Max Biaggi	MotoGP	2002
7	(Italy) Max Biaggi	500cc	1998, 2000
7	(Italy) Max Biaggi	250cc	1994, 1995, 1996, 1997
7	(Italy) Valentino Rossi	MotoGP	2003, 2005, 2008, 2009
7	(Italy) Valentino Rossi	500cc	2001
7	(Italy) Valentino Rossi	250cc	1999
7	(Italy) Valentino Rossi	125cc	1996
6	(United Kingdom) Mike Hailwood	500cc	1965, 1966, 1967
6	(United Kingdom) Mike Hailwood	350cc	1966, 1967
6	(United Kingdom) Mike Hailwood	250cc	1966
6	(United Kingdom) Phil Read	500cc	1974, 1975
6	(United Kingdom) Phil Read	250cc	1965, 1967, 1968
6	(United Kingdom) Phil Read	125cc	1968
6	(Spain) Marc Márquez	MotoGP	2013, 2017, 2019, 2025, 2026
6	(Spain) Marc Márquez	Moto2	2012
5	(Germany) Anton Mang	350cc	1980, 1981
5	(Germany) Anton Mang	250cc	1980, 1981, 1987
5	(Spain) Jorge Lorenzo	MotoGP	2010, 2015
5	(Spain) Jorge Lorenzo	250cc	2006, 2007
5	(Spain) Jorge Lorenzo	125cc	2004
4	(South Africa) Kork Ballington	350cc	1978, 1979
4	(South Africa) Kork Ballington	250cc	1978, 1979
4	(Spain) Dani Pedrosa	MotoGP	2012, 2014
4	(Spain) Dani Pedrosa	250cc	2005
4	(Spain) Dani Pedrosa	125cc	2003
3	(Finland) Jarno Saarinen	350cc	1971, 1972
3	(Finland) Jarno Saarinen	250cc	1972
3	(Italy) Walter Villa	350cc	1976
3	(Italy) Walter Villa	250cc	1974, 1976
3	(United States) Wayne Rainey	500cc	1990, 1991, 1993
3	(Japan) Kazuto Sakata	125cc	1993, 1994, 1995
3	(Italy) Marco Melandri	250cc	2002
3	(Italy) Marco Melandri	125cc	1998, 1999
2	(Italy) Otello Buscherini	350cc	1975
2	(Italy) Otello Buscherini	125cc	1973
2	(Venezuela) Johnny Cecotto	500cc	1977
2	(Venezuela) Johnny Cecotto	350cc	1977
2	(France) Guy Bertin	125cc	1979, 1980
2	(Australia) Wayne Gardner	500cc	1987, 1988
2	(Spain) Jorge Martínez	125cc	1988
2	(Spain) Jorge Martínez	80cc	1988
2	(Spain) Àlex Crivillé	500cc	1996
2	(Spain) Àlex Crivillé	125cc	1989
2	(Australia) Mick Doohan	500cc	1994, 1997
2	(Japan) Tetsuya Harada	250cc	1998, 2001
2	(Spain) Toni Elías	Moto2	2010
2	(Spain) Toni Elías	125cc	2001
2	(Spain) Nicolás Terol	125cc	2009, 2010
2	(Australia) Casey Stoner	MotoGP	2007, 2011
2	(Germany) Jonas Folger	Moto2	2016
2	(Germany) Jonas Folger	Moto3	2012
2	(Switzerland) Thomas Lüthi	Moto2	2017
2	(Switzerland) Thomas Lüthi	125cc	2005

=== Multiple winners (manufacturers) ===
# Wins	Manufacturer	Wins	
# Wins	Manufacturer	Category	Years won
43	(Japan) Honda	MotoGP	2003, 2004, 2011, 2012, 2013, 2014, 2016, 2017, 2019
43	(Japan) Honda	500cc	1966, 1967, 1987, 1988, 1994, 1996, 1997, 1998, 1999, 2001
43	(Japan) Honda	350cc	1965, 1966, 1967
43	(Japan) Honda	250cc	1966, 1987, 1989, 1990, 1991, 1997, 2005
43	(Japan) Honda	Moto3	2014, 2015, 2017, 2018, 2020
43	(Japan) Honda	125cc	1966, 1990, 1993, 1997, 1998, 1999, 2001, 2003, 2005
31	(Japan) Yamaha	MotoGP	2002, 2005, 2008, 2009, 2010, 2015
31	(Japan) Yamaha	500cc	1977, 1990, 1991, 1993, 1995, 2000
31	(Japan) Yamaha	350cc	1971, 1972, 1973
31	(Japan) Yamaha	250cc	1965, 1967, 1968, 1970, 1971, 1972, 1973, 1975, 1977, 1982, 1988, 2000
31	(Japan) Yamaha	125cc	1967, 1968, 1974, 1975
25	(Italy) Aprilia	250cc	1993, 1994, 1995, 1996, 1998, 1999, 2001, 2002, 2003, 2004, 2006, 2007, 2008
25	(Italy) Aprilia	125cc	1991, 1994, 1995, 1996, 2000, 2002, 2006, 2007, 2008, 2009, 2010, 2011
10	(Italy) MV Agusta	500cc	1965, 1968, 1969, 1972, 1973, 1974, 1975
10	(Italy) MV Agusta	350cc	1968, 1969, 1970
9	(Japan) Kawasaki	350cc	1978, 1979, 1980, 1981
9	(Japan) Kawasaki	250cc	1978, 1979, 1980, 1981
9	(Japan) Kawasaki	125cc	1969
9	(Germany) Kalex	Moto2	2013, 2014, 2015, 2016, 2017, 2019, 2020, 2025, 2026
6	(Austria) KTM	MotoGP	2020
6	(Austria) KTM	Moto2	2018
6	(Austria) KTM	Moto3	2013, 2019, 2025, 2026
5	(United States) Harley-Davidson	350cc	1976
5	(United States) Harley-Davidson	250cc	1974, 1975, 1976, 1977
5	(Italy) Ducati	MotoGP	2006, 2007, 2018, 2025, 2026
4	(Spain) Derbi	125cc	1971, 1988, 2004
4	(Spain) Derbi	80cc	1988
3	(Japan) Suzuki	500cc	1976, 1989
3	(Japan) Suzuki	125cc	1965
2	(Netherlands) Jamathi	50cc	1969, 1970
2	(France) Motobécane	125cc	1979, 1980
2	(Spain) Bultaco	50cc	1978, 1981
2	(Italy) Garelli	125cc	1982, 1987
2	(West Germany) Krauser	80cc	1987, 1989
2	(Switzerland) Suter	Moto2	2011, 2012

=== Winners of the Czech motorcycle Grand Prix ===
Year	Track	Moto3		Moto2		MotoGP		Report
Year	Track	Rider	Manufacturer	Rider	Manufacturer	Rider	Manufacturer	Report
2026	Brno	(Malaysia) Hakim Danish	KTM	(Spain) Iván Ortolá	Kalex	(Spain) Marc Márquez	Ducati	Report
2025	Brno	(Spain) José Antonio Rueda	KTM	(United States) Joe Roberts	Kalex	(Spain) Marc Márquez	Ducati	Report
2020	Brno	(Italy) Dennis Foggia	Honda	(Italy) Enea Bastianini	Kalex	(South Africa) Brad Binder	KTM	Report
2019	Brno	(Spain) Arón Canet	KTM	(Spain) Álex Márquez	Kalex	(Spain) Marc Márquez	Honda	Report
2018	Brno	(Italy) Fabio Di Giannantonio	Honda	(Portugal) Miguel Oliveira	KTM	(Italy) Andrea Dovizioso	Ducati	Report
2017	Brno	(Spain) Joan Mir	Honda	(Switzerland) Thomas Lüthi	Kalex	(Spain) Marc Márquez	Honda	Report
2016	Brno	(United Kingdom) John McPhee	Peugeot	(Germany) Jonas Folger	Kalex	(United Kingdom) Cal Crutchlow	Honda	Report
2015	Brno	(Italy) Niccolò Antonelli	Honda	(France) Johann Zarco	Kalex	(Spain) Jorge Lorenzo	Yamaha	Report
2014	Brno	(France) Alexis Masbou	Honda	(Spain) Esteve Rabat	Kalex	(Spain) Dani Pedrosa	Honda	Report
2013	Brno	(Spain) Luis Salom	KTM	(Finland) Mika Kallio	Kalex	(Spain) Marc Márquez	Honda	Report
2012	Brno	(Germany) Jonas Folger	Kalex KTM	(Spain) Marc Márquez	Suter	(Spain) Dani Pedrosa	Honda	Report
Year	Track	125cc		Moto2		MotoGP		Report
Year	Track	Rider	Manufacturer	Rider	Manufacturer	Rider	Manufacturer	Report
2011	Brno	(Germany) Sandro Cortese	Aprilia	(Italy) Andrea Iannone	Suter	(Australia) Casey Stoner	Honda	Report
2010	Brno	(Spain) Nicolás Terol	Aprilia	(Spain) Toni Elías	Moriwaki	(Spain) Jorge Lorenzo	Yamaha	Report
Year	Track	125cc		250cc		MotoGP		Report
Year	Track	Rider	Manufacturer	Rider	Manufacturer	Rider	Manufacturer	Report
2009	Brno	(Spain) Nicolás Terol	Aprilia	(Italy) Marco Simoncelli	Gilera	(Italy) Valentino Rossi	Yamaha	Report
2008	Brno	(Germany) Stefan Bradl	Aprilia	(Spain) Alex Debón	Aprilia	(Italy) Valentino Rossi	Yamaha	Report
2007	Brno	(Spain) Héctor Faubel	Aprilia	(Spain) Jorge Lorenzo	Aprilia	(Australia) Casey Stoner	Ducati	Report
2006	Brno	(Spain) Álvaro Bautista	Aprilia	(Spain) Jorge Lorenzo	Aprilia	(Italy) Loris Capirossi	Ducati	Report
2005	Brno	(Switzerland) Thomas Lüthi	Honda	(Spain) Daniel Pedrosa	Honda	(Italy) Valentino Rossi	Yamaha	Report
2004	Brno	(Spain) Jorge Lorenzo	Derbi	(Argentina) Sebastián Porto	Aprilia	(Spain) Sete Gibernau	Honda	Report
2003	Brno	(Spain) Daniel Pedrosa	Honda	(France) Randy de Puniet	Aprilia	(Italy) Valentino Rossi	Honda	Report
2002	Brno	(Italy) Lucio Cecchinello	Aprilia	(Italy) Marco Melandri	Aprilia	(Italy) Max Biaggi	Yamaha	Report
Year	Track	125cc		250cc		500cc		Report
Year	Track	Rider	Manufacturer	Rider	Manufacturer	Rider	Manufacturer	Report
2001	Brno	(Spain) Toni Elías	Honda	(Japan) Tetsuya Harada	Aprilia	(Italy) Valentino Rossi	Honda	Report
2000	Brno	(Italy) Roberto Locatelli	Aprilia	(Japan) Shinya Nakano	Yamaha	(Italy) Max Biaggi	Yamaha	Report
1999	Brno	(Italy) Marco Melandri	Honda	(Italy) Valentino Rossi	Aprilia	(Japan) Tadayuki Okada	Honda	Report
1998	Brno	(Italy) Marco Melandri	Honda	(Japan) Tetsuya Harada	Aprilia	(Italy) Max Biaggi	Honda	Report
1997	Brno	(Japan) Noboru Ueda	Honda	(Italy) Max Biaggi	Honda	(Australia) Mick Doohan	Honda	Report
1996	Brno	(Italy) Valentino Rossi	Aprilia	(Italy) Max Biaggi	Aprilia	(Spain) Àlex Crivillé	Honda	Report
1995	Brno	(Japan) Kazuto Sakata	Aprilia	(Italy) Max Biaggi	Aprilia	(Italy) Luca Cadalora	Yamaha	Report
1994	Brno	(Japan) Kazuto Sakata	Aprilia	(Italy) Max Biaggi	Aprilia	(Australia) Mick Doohan	Honda	Report
1993	Brno	(Japan) Kazuto Sakata	Honda	(Italy) Loris Reggiani	Aprilia	(United States) Wayne Rainey	Yamaha	Report

=== Winners of the Czechoslovak motorcycle Grand Prix ===
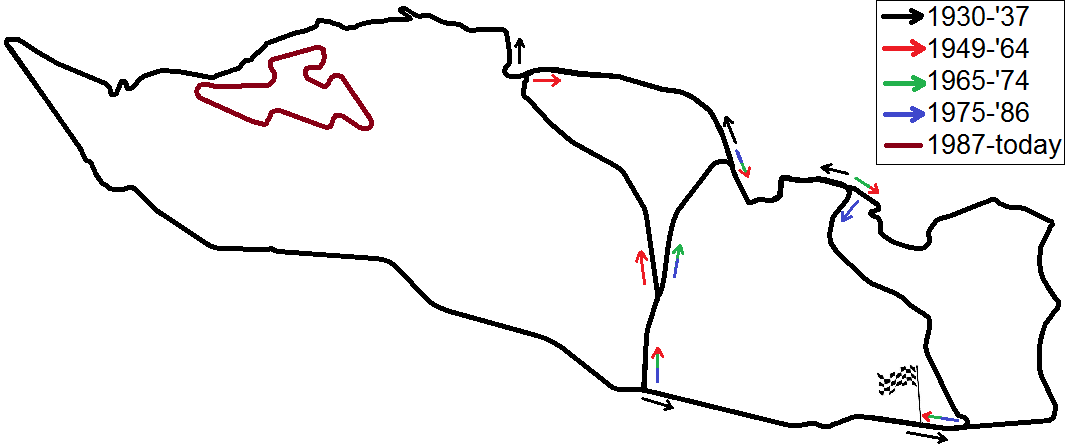
All layouts of the Masaryk Circuit (Brno Circuit) between 1930 and today combined

A pink background indicates an event that was not part of the Grand Prix motorcycle racing championship.

Year	Track	125cc		250cc		500cc		Report
Year	Track	Rider	Manufacturer	Rider	Manufacturer	Rider	Manufacturer	Report
1991	Brno	(Italy) Alessandro Gramigni	Aprilia	(Germany) Helmut Bradl	Honda	(United States) Wayne Rainey	Yamaha	Report
1990	Brno	(Netherlands) Hans Spaan	Honda	(Spain) Carlos Cardús	Honda	(United States) Wayne Rainey	Yamaha	Report

Year	Track	80cc		125cc		250cc		500cc		Report
Year	Track	Rider	Manufacturer	Rider	Manufacturer	Rider	Manufacturer	Rider	Manufacturer	Report
1989	Brno	(Spain) Herri Torrontegui	Krauser	(Spain) Àlex Crivillé	JJ Cobas	(West Germany) Reinhold Roth	Honda	(United States) Kevin Schwantz	Suzuki	Report
1988	Brno	(Spain) Jorge Martínez	Derbi	(Spain) Jorge Martínez	Derbi	(Spain) Joan Garriga	Yamaha	(Australia) Wayne Gardner	Honda	Report
1987	Brno	(Switzerland) Stefan Dörflinger	Krauser	(Italy) Fausto Gresini	Garelli	(West Germany) Anton Mang	Honda	(Australia) Wayne Gardner	Honda	Report
1986	Brno	(Italy) Bruno Casanova				(Austria) Hans Lindner				Report
1985	Brno			(France) Paul Bordes		(Italy) Massimo Matteoni				Report
1984	Brno							(Italy) Massimo Messere		Report
Year	Track	50cc		125cc		250cc		500cc		Report
Year	Track	Rider	Manufacturer	Rider	Manufacturer	Rider	Manufacturer	Rider	Manufacturer	Report
1983	Brno							(West Germany) Gustav Reiner		Report

Year	Track	50cc		125cc		250cc		350cc		500cc		Report
Year	Track	Rider	Manufacturer	Rider	Manufacturer	Rider	Manufacturer	Rider	Manufacturer	Rider	Manufacturer	Report
1982	Brno			(Italy) Eugenio Lazzarini	Garelli	(Venezuela) Carlos Lavado	Yamaha	(Belgium) Didier de Radiguès	Chevallier			Report
1981	Brno	(Netherlands) Theo Timmer	Bultaco			(West Germany) Anton Mang	Kawasaki	(West Germany) Anton Mang	Kawasaki			Report
1980	Brno			(France) Guy Bertin	Motobécane	(West Germany) Anton Mang	Kawasaki	(West Germany) Anton Mang	Kawasaki			Report
1979	Brno			(France) Guy Bertin	Motobécane	(South Africa) Kork Ballington	Kawasaki	(South Africa) Kork Ballington	Kawasaki			Report
1978	Brno	(Spain) Ricardo Tormo	Bultaco			(South Africa) Kork Ballington	Kawasaki	(South Africa) Kork Ballington	Kawasaki			Report
1977	Brno					(Italy) Franco Uncini	Harley-Davidson	(Venezuela) Johnny Cecotto	Yamaha	(Venezuela) Johnny Cecotto	Yamaha	Report
1976	Brno					(Italy) Walter Villa	Harley-Davidson	(Italy) Walter Villa	Harley-Davidson	(United Kingdom) John Newbold	Suzuki	Report
1975	Brno			(Sweden) Leif Gustafsson	Yamaha	(France) Michel Rougerie	Harley-Davidson	(Italy) Otello Buscherini	Yamaha	(United Kingdom) Phil Read	MV Agusta	Report
1974	Brno	(Netherlands) Henk van Kessel	Van Veen Kreidler	(Sweden) Kent Andersson	Yamaha	(Italy) Walter Villa	Harley-Davidson			(United Kingdom) Phil Read	MV Agusta	Report
1973	Brno			(Italy) Otello Buscherini	Malanca	(West Germany) Dieter Braun	Yamaha	(Finland) Teuvo Länsivuori	Yamaha	(Italy) Giacomo Agostini	MV Agusta	Report
1972	Brno			(Sweden) Börje Jansson	Maico	(Finland) Jarno Saarinen	Yamaha	(Finland) Jarno Saarinen	Yamaha	(Italy) Giacomo Agostini	MV Agusta	Report
1971	Brno	(United Kingdom) Barry Sheene	Kreidler	(Spain) Ángel Nieto	Derbi	(Hungary) János Drapál	Yamaha	(Finland) Jarno Saarinen	Yamaha			Report
1970	Brno	(Netherlands) Aalt Toersen	Jamathi	(Italy) Gilberto Parlotti	Morbidelli	(Australia) Kel Carruthers	Yamaha	(Italy) Giacomo Agostini	MV Agusta			Report
1969	Brno	(Netherlands) Paul Lodewijkx	Jamathi	(United Kingdom) Dave Simmonds	Kawasaki	(Italy) Renzo Pasolini	Benelli	(Italy) Giacomo Agostini	MV Agusta	(Italy) Giacomo Agostini	MV Agusta	Report
1968	Brno			(United Kingdom) Phil Read	Yamaha	(United Kingdom) Phil Read	Yamaha	(Italy) Giacomo Agostini	MV Agusta	(Italy) Giacomo Agostini	MV Agusta	Report
1967	Brno			(United Kingdom) Bill Ivy	Yamaha	(United Kingdom) Phil Read	Yamaha	(United Kingdom) Mike Hailwood	Honda	(United Kingdom) Mike Hailwood	Honda	Report
1966	Brno			(Switzerland) Luigi Taveri	Honda	(United Kingdom) Mike Hailwood	Honda	(United Kingdom) Mike Hailwood	Honda	(United Kingdom) Mike Hailwood	Honda	Report
1965	Brno			(United Kingdom) Frank Perris	Suzuki	(United Kingdom) Phil Read	Yamaha	(Rhodesia) Jim Redman	Honda	(United Kingdom) Mike Hailwood	MV Agusta	Report
1964	Brno			(Switzerland) Luigi Taveri		(East Germany) Heinz Rosner		(Czechoslovakia) Stanislav Malina				Report
1963	Brno			(Switzerland) Luigi Taveri		(Czechoslovakia) Stanislav Malina		(Czechoslovakia) Gustav Havel		(Czechoslovakia) Gustav Havel		Report
1962	Brno					(Czechoslovakia) Stanislav Malina		(Federation of Rhodesia and Nyasaland) Jim Redman		(Czechoslovakia) František Šťastný		Report
Year	Track			125cc		250cc		350cc		500cc		Report
1961	Brno			(Federation of Rhodesia and Nyasaland) Jim Redman		(Federation of Rhodesia and Nyasaland) Jim Redman		(Czechoslovakia) František Šťastný		(Austria) Rudolf Thalhammer		Report
1960	Brno			(East Germany) Ernst Degner		(Czechoslovakia) František Šťastný		(Czechoslovakia) František Šťastný		(Federation of Rhodesia and Nyasaland) Gary Hocking		Report
1959	Brno			(East Germany) Ernst Degner		(Czechoslovakia) František Srna		(Czechoslovakia) František Šťastný		(Australia) Eric Hinton		Report
1958	Brno			(East Germany) Ernst Degner		(Czechoslovakia) František Bartoš		(Czechoslovakia) František Šťastný		(United Kingdom) Dickie Dale		Report
1957	Brno			(East Germany) Ernst Degner		(West Germany) Helmut Hallmeier		(West Germany) Helmut Hallmeier		(Austria) Gerold Klinger		Report
1956	Brno			(Czechoslovakia) František Bartoš		(West Germany) Horst Kassner		(Czechoslovakia) František Šťastný		(Austria) Gerold Klinger		Report
1955	Brno			(Czechoslovakia) Václav Parus		(West Germany) Horst Kassner		(West Germany) Hans Baltisberger		(Australia) Keith Campbell		Report
1954	Brno			(Czechoslovakia) František Bartoš		(Czechoslovakia) František Šťastný		(Austria) Leonhard Faßl		(Czechoslovakia) Gustav Havel		Report
1952	Brno			(West Germany) Bernhard Petruschke		(Czechoslovakia) František Bartoš		(Czechoslovakia) František Bartoš		(Czechoslovakia) Antonín Vitvar		Report
1951	Brno									(Czechoslovakia) Antonín Vitvar		Report
1950	Brno					(Czechoslovakia) Josef Vejvoda		(Czechoslovakia) Antonín Vitvar		(Czechoslovakia) Antonín Vitvar		Report
1947	Prague					(United Kingdom) Fergus Anderson		(United Kingdom) Fergus Anderson		(United Kingdom) Ted Frost		Report
