= Malanca =

- Industry: Motorcycle
- Founded: 1956 in Bologna, Italy
- Founder: Mario Malanca
- Defunct: 1986
- Key people: Marco Malanca (CEO) 1978-86

Malanca was an Italian motorcycle maker. The company's founder, Mario Malanca, started the venture by building mechanical parts and hubs for motorcycle wheels before producing his first complete motorcycle in 1956.

The company found success in Italy, then eventually went on to produce bikes for Asia and America. Initially its engines were supplied by Franco Morini. Then, in 1960, Malanca built a new factory and started producing its own. In 1973 Mario presented the first 125cc twin cylinder Malanca at the Paris Motor Show.

In 1978 Mario's son, Marco Malanca, was appointed CEO; by this time the company was officially known as Malanca Motors SpA. After his appointment, production focused mainly on 125cc models.

After the peak of moped sales in Italy in 1980 and its eventual decline, Malanca moved on to larger-engined bikes. The company struggled, however, as it had spent much of its time and resources on the 125cc scooters as well as on research for, and development of, the smaller 50cc-engined bikes for both racing and regular sales. The company eventually folded in 1986.

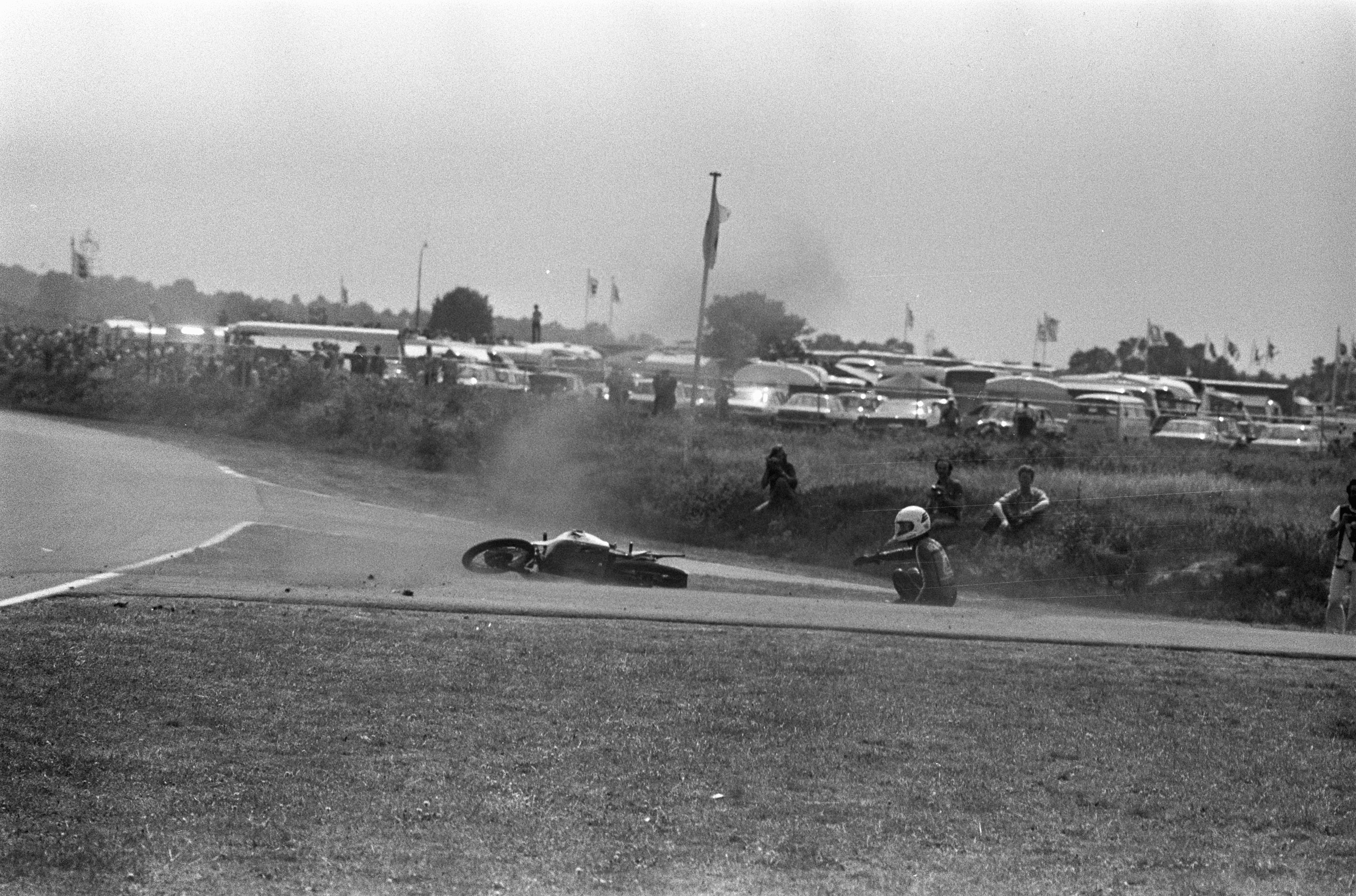
Otello Buscherini racing a 125 in 1973

== Racing history ==
Malanca made their racing debut in 1968 with riders Walter Villa and Otello Buscherini winning six championships in the 50cc and 60cc classes. Buscherini also won twice in the 125 GP and died whilst competing for Malanca in the 1976 Nations motorcycle Grand Prix. After the death of their champion racer Malanca withdrew from competitions appearing only twice more, once in 1978 with the JPS (John Player Special) colours and again in 1985 in the 250GP with Stefano Caracchi, with little success.

== Models produced ==
=== Mopeds (incomplete) ===
- Testa Rossa

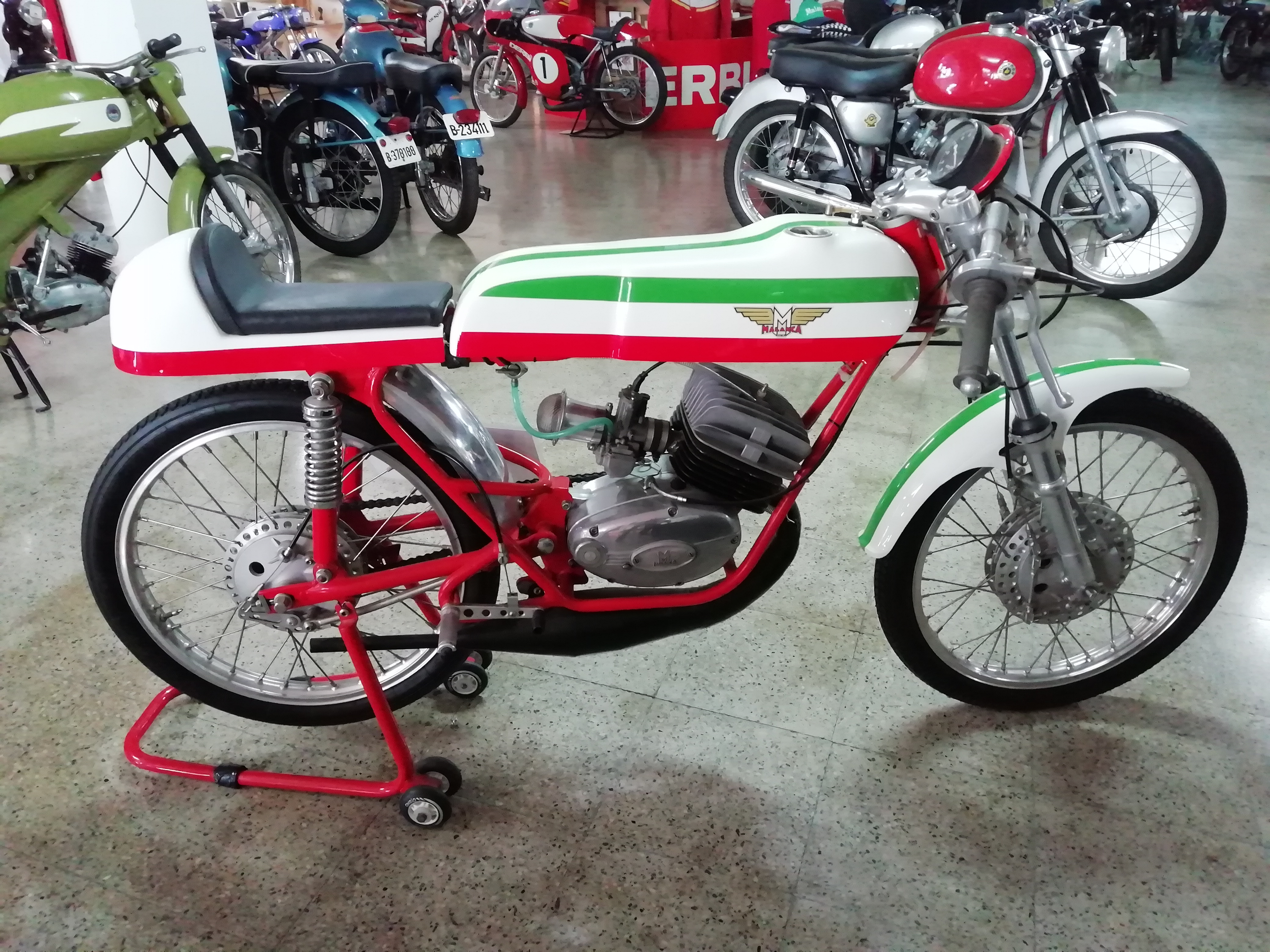
1971 Malanca Testa Rossa 50cc

=== Motorcycles (incomplete) ===
- 75 Mario
- 125 E2C Sport
- 125 Mark Enduro
- Cocaine 125
- E2C 150
- E2CS
- GT180
- OB One
- OB One Racing.

=== Scooters ===
Vispetta
