= 1972 Isle of Man TT =

Annual motorcycle racing event

The 1972 Isle of Man TT motorcycle races were held between 5–9 June 1972. It was the fifth round of the FIM Motorcycle Grand Prix World Championship (now MotoGP).

A fatal accident this year led, some years later, to the end of the Isle of Man TT as a FIM championship race. The Ultra-Lightweight race was held on the last day of the event in heavy rain, and Gilberto Parlotti crashed fatally at the Verandah section of the circuit 29 miles into his second lap; the Italian rider was 31 years old. After the death of Parlotti, his friend, Giacomo Agostini, an Italian MV Agusta rider, 9-time TT winner and a ten time 350cc and 500cc world champion, announced that he would never return to the Isle of Man to race. He considered the course too dangerous for international competition. As the years went on more top riders joined Agostini's boycott and in 1976 it was announced that the TT would be removed from the championship calendar. The British round of the FIM championship was held at Silverstone Circuit on the mainland from 1977 onwards.

In the last race of the 1972 event, Agostini won his 10th TT - the most for a non-British rider.

== 1972 Isle of Man Junior TT 350cc final standings ==
Monday 5 June 1972 – 5 Laps (188.65 Miles) Mountain Course.

Place	Rider	Number	Country	Machine	Speed	Time	Points
1	(Italy) Giacomo Agostini	3	Italy	MV Agusta	102.03 mph	1:50.56.8	15
2	(United Kingdom) Tony Rutter	16	United Kingdom	Yamaha	98.13 mph	1:55.21.4	12
3	(United Kingdom) Mick Grant	27	United Kingdom	Yamaha	97.57 mph	1:56.01.0	10
4	(Australia) Jack Findlay	4	Australia	Yamaha	97.41 mph	1:53.13.0	8
5	(United Kingdom) Derek Chatterton	6	United Kingdom	Yamaha	95.65 mph	1:58.21.4	6
6	(Wales) Selwyn Griffiths	49	United Kingdom	Yamaha	94.16 mph	2:00.13.8	5
7	(United Kingdom) Mick Chatterton	17	United Kingdom	Yamaha	92.98 mph	2:01.45.2	4
8	(Hungary) László Szabó	23	Hungary	Yamaha	90.52 mph	2:05.03.80	3
9	(United Kingdom) Bill Rae	85	United Kingdom	Yamaha	90.51 mph	2:05.04.80	2
10	(United Kingdom) B.Lee	53	United Kingdom	Yamaha	89.85 mph	2:05.59.6	1

== 1972 Isle of Man Sidecar 500cc TT final standings ==
Monday 5 June 1972 – 3 Laps (113.00 Miles) Mountain Course.

Place	Rider	Number	Country	Machine	Speed	Time	Points
1	(West Germany) Siegfried Schauzu/Wolfgang Kalauch	5	West Germany	BMW	91.85 mph	1:13.57.2	15
2	(West Germany) Heinz Luthringshauser/J.Cusnik	7	West Germany	BMW	91.70 mph	1:14.04.6	12
3	(United Kingdom) Gerry Boret/Nick Boret	29	United Kingdom	Konig	84.43 mph	1:20.27.4	10
4	(West Germany) W.Klenk/N.Scheerer	20	West Germany	BMW	83.62 mph	1:21.31.8	8
5	(United Kingdom) Barry Dungworth/R.W.Turrington	10	United Kingdom	BMW	82.32 mph	1:22.30.6	6
6	(United Kingdom) Roy Hanks/J.P.Mann	6	United Kingdom	BSA	80.07 mph	1:24.49.6	5
7	(United Kingdom) R.Woodhouse/D.Woodhouse	45	United Kingdom	BSA	79.83 mph	1.25.05.40	4
8	(United Kingdom) Roger Dutton/Tony Wright	26	United Kingdom	BMW	79.63 mph	1.25.18.0	3
9	(United Kingdom) George O'Dell/Bill Boldison	32	United Kingdom	BSA	79.60 mph	1.25.20.2	2
10	(United Kingdom) J.Barker/A.Macfadzean	27	United Kingdom	BSA	79.52 mph	1.25.28.2	1

== 1972 Isle of Man Lightweight TT 250cc final standings ==
Wednesday 7 June 1972 – 4 Laps (150.92 Miles) Mountain Course.

Place	Rider	Number	Country	Machine	Speed	Time	Points
1	(United Kingdom) Phil Read	9	United Kingdom	Yamaha	99.68 mph	1:30.51.2	15
2	(United Kingdom) Rod Gould	4	United Kingdom	Yamaha	98.09 mph	1:32.19.6	12
3	(United Kingdom) John Williams		United Kingdom	Yamaha	97.09 mph	1:33.16.4	10
4	(United Kingdom) Charlie Williams	25	United Kingdom	Yamaha	95.98 mph	1:34.24.1	8
5	(Switzerland) Werner Pfirter	20	Switzerland	Yamaha	95.93 mph	1:34.24.2	6
6	(United Kingdom) Bill Henderson	35	United Kingdom	Yamaha	95.26 mph	1:35.04.4	5
7	(United Kingdom) Derek Chatterton	1	United Kingdom	Yamaha	95.13 mph	1:35.12.20	4
8	(United Kingdom) Dudley P.Robinson	18	United Kingdom	Yamaha	94.88 mph	1:35.27.4	3
9	(United Kingdom) Barry Randle	10	United Kingdom	Yamaha	94.84 mph	1:35.29.8	2
10	(United Kingdom) B.Rae	54	United Kingdom	Yamaha	92.86 mph	1:37.31.8	1

== 1972 Isle of Man Ultra-Lightweight TT 125cc final standings ==
Friday 9 June 1972 – 3 Laps (113.00 Miles) Mountain Course.

Place	Rider	Number	Country	Machine	Speed	Time	Points
1	(United Kingdom) Chas Mortimer	1	United Kingdom	Yamaha	87.49 mph	1:17.38.2	15
2	(United Kingdom) Charlie Williams	28	United Kingdom	Yamaha	80.49 mph	1:24.23.0	12
3	(United Kingdom) Billy Rae	15	United Kingdom	Maico	79.29 mph	1:25.39.8	10
4	(United Kingdom) Lindsay Porter	9	United Kingdom	Honda	78.63 mph	1:26.30.0	8
5	(United Kingdom) Ron Hackett	17	United Kingdom	Honda	76.55 mph	1:28.44.0	6
6	(United Kingdom) Ralph Watts	18	United Kingdom	Honda	76.40 mph	1:28.54.0	5
7	(United Kingdom) Fred Launchbury	19	United Kingdom	Maico	75.75 mph	1:29.40.60	4
8	(United Kingdom) Leigh Notman	44	United Kingdom	Yamaha	75.74 mph	1:29.41.40	3
9	(United Kingdom) A.Morris	45	United Kingdom	Yamaha	75.70 mph	1:29.43.60	2
10	(United Kingdom) M.Evans	43	United Kingdom	Yamaha	75.23 mph	1:30.17.40	1

== 1972 Isle of Man Senior TT 500cc final standings ==
Friday 9 June 1972 – 6 Laps (236.38 Miles) Mountain Course.

Place	Rider	Number	Country	Machine	Speed	Time	Points
1	(Italy) Giacomo Agostini	8	Italy	MV Agusta	104.02 mph	2:10.34.4	15
2	(Italy) Alberto Pagani	3	Italy	MV Agusta	98.13 mph	2:18.25.8	12
3	(United Kingdom) Mick Grant	14	United Kingdom	Kawasaki	97.03 mph	2:20.00.0	10
4	(United Kingdom) Kevin Cowley	81	United Kingdom	Seeley	96.10 mph	2:21.21.6	8
5	(United Kingdom) Derek Chatterton	16	United Kingdom	Yamaha	95.80 mph	2:21.48.2	6
6	(United Kingdom) Charlie Williams	49	United Kingdom	Yamaha	94.52 mph	2:23.43.8	5
7	(Wales) Selwyn Griffiths	21	United Kingdom	Matchless	93.66 mph	2:25.02.0	4
8	(United Kingdom) Clive Brown		United Kingdom	Suzuki	93.58 mph	2:25.09.40	3
8	(United Kingdom) Paul Cott	34	United Kingdom	Seeley	93.58 mph	2:25.09.40	3
10	(United Kingdom) Charlie Sanby	12	United Kingdom	Suzuki	93.33 mph	2:26.41.2	1

== Non-championship races ==
=== 1972 Isle of Man Production 750 cc TT final standings ===
Saturday 3 June 1972 – 4 Laps (150.92 Miles) Mountain Course.

Rank	Rider	Team	Speed	Time
1	(United Kingdom) Ray Pickrell	Triumph	100.01 mph	1.30.34.0
2	(United Kingdom) Peter Williams	Norton	96.53 mph	1.33.48.8
3	(United Kingdom) David Nixon	Triumph	94.04 mph	1.36.18.4
4	(West Germany) Helmut Dahne	BMW	92.3 mph	1.38.07.2
5	(United Kingdom) Martyn Ashwood	Norton	92.08 mph	1.38.21.0
6	(United Kingdom) Alistair Copeland	Triumph	90.99 mph	1.39.32.0
7	(United Kingdom) Walter Baxter	Norton	89.31 mph	1.41.24.2
8	(United Kingdom) Doug Lunn	Honda	88.82 mph	1.41.57.6
9	(United Kingdom) T Waterer	Norton	88.21 mph	1.42.40.0
10	(United Kingdom) R Baylie	Honda	87.78 mph	1.43.10.2

=== 1972 Isle of Man Production 500 cc TT final standings ===
Saturday 3 June 1972 – 4 Laps (150.92 Miles) Mountain Course.

Rank	Rider	Team	Speed	Time
1	(United Kingdom) Stan Woods	Suzuki	92.2 mph	1.38.13.8
2	(United Kingdom) Roger Bowler	Triumph	92.09 mph	1.38.20.6
3	(United Kingdom) Barry Smith	Honda	91.16 mph	1.39.20.6
4	(United Kingdom) Ray Knight	Triumph	89.91 mph	1.40.43.8
5	(United Kingdom) Hugh Evans	Kawasaki	89.63 mph	1.41.02.8
6	(United Kingdom) Graham Penny	Honda	88.29 mph	1.42.34.6
7	(United Kingdom) Bill Milne	Kawasaki	88 mph	1.42.54.6
8	(United Kingdom) Tom Loughridge	Suzuki	87.25 mph	1.43.48.2
9	(United Kingdom) Roy Boughey	Honda	85.07 mph	1.46.27.0
10	(United Kingdom) Raymond Ashcroft	Honda	84.58 mph	1.47.05.4

=== 1972 Isle of Man Production 250 cc TT final standings ===
Saturday 3 June 1972 – 4 Laps (150.92 Miles) Mountain Course.

Rank	Rider	Team	Speed	Time
1	(United Kingdom) John Williams	Honda	85.32 mph	1.46.08.8
2	(United Kingdom) Charlie Williams	Yamaha	84.06 mph	1.47.50.2
3	(United Kingdom) Eddie Roberts	Suzuki	83.34 mph	1.48.56.4
4	(United Kingdom) Dave Arnold	Ducati	82.75 mph	1.49.26.8
5	(United Kingdom) Neil Tuxworth	Suzuki	82.72 mph	1.49.29.2
6	(United Kingdom) Jim Evans	Yamaha	79.6 mph	1.53.46.2
7	(United Kingdom) Victor Soussan	Suzuki	79.23 mph	1.54.18.6
8	(United Kingdom) John Kiddie	Honda	78.34 mph	1.55.36.2
9	(United Kingdom) Charles Garner	Honda	76.58 mph	1.58.15.8
10	(United Kingdom) Leigh Notman	Yamaha	76.34 mph	1.58.38.0

=== 1972 Isle of Man Sidecar 750cc TT final standings ===
Saturday 3 June 1972 – 3 Laps (113.00 Miles) Mountain Course.

Place	Rider	Number	Country	Machine	Speed	Time
1	(West Germany) Siegfried Schauzu/Wolfgang Kalauch	4	West Germany	BMW	90.97 mph	1.14.40.0
2	(United Kingdom) A J Sansum/Chris Emmins	10	United Kingdom	Triumph	87.76 mph	1.17.24.0
3	(United Kingdom) J.Barker/A.Macfadzean	31	United Kingdom	BSA	86.32 mph	1.18.41.6
4	(United Kingdom) John Brandon & Cliff Holland	28	United Kingdom	Honda	84.99 mph	1.19.55.2
5	(West Germany) Richard Wegener & A Heinrichs	5	West Germany	BMW	84.88 mph	1.20.24.0
6	(United Kingdom) Roy Hanks/J.P.Mann	2	United Kingdom	BSA	84.36 mph	1.20.31.2
7	(United Kingdom) Mick Horsepole/G J Horspole	21	United Kingdom	BSA	84.22 mph	1.20.39.2
8	(United Kingdom) R.Woodhouse/D.Woodhouse	12	United Kingdom	Honda	81.93 mph	1.22.54.2
9	(United Kingdom) Robin Williamson/Dave Smith	9	United Kingdom	Triumph	81.65 mph	1.23.11.8
10	(United Kingdom) Trevor Ireson/M B Smith	27	United Kingdom	Triumph	81.31 mph	1.23.32.6

=== 1972 Isle of Man Formula 750 cc TT final standings ===
Monday 5 June 1972 – 5 Laps (188.65 Miles) Mountain Course.

Rank	Rider	Team	Speed	Time
1	(United Kingdom) Ray Pickrell	Triumph	104.23 mph	1.48.36.0
2	(United Kingdom) Tony Jefferies	Triumph	103.46 mph	1.49.24.8
3	(Australia) Jack Findlay	Suzuki	98.33 mph	1.55.07.4
4	(United Kingdom) David Nixon	Triumph	96.12 mph	1.57.46.4
5	(United Kingdom) Charlie Williams	Yamaha	95.99 mph	1.57.56.8
6	(United Kingdom) Bob Steele	Norton	95.31 mph	1.58.46.2
7	(United Kingdom) John Williams	Honda	95.1 mph	1.59.02.0
8	(United Kingdom) Roger Nicholls	Suzuki	94.85 mph	1.59.21.0
9	(United Kingdom) Dennis Trollope	Triumph	93.53 mph	2.01.02.6
10	(United Kingdom) Clive Brown	Suzuki	93.11 mph	2.01.35.2
