= Austrian motorcycle Grand Prix =

Motorcycling event held in Austria

Austrian Grand Prix

Grand Prix motorcycle racing
- Venue: Red Bull Ring (1996–1997, 2016–present); Salzburgring (1971–1979, 1981–1991, 1993–1994)
- First race: 1971
- Most wins (rider): Giacomo Agostini, Ángel Nieto (6)
- Most wins (manufacturer): Honda (24)

The Austrian motorcycle Grand Prix is a motorcycling event that is part of the FIM Grand Prix motorcycle racing season from 1971 to 1997, and then again from 2016 onwards. The event is due to take place at the Red Bull Ring until at least 2030.

== History ==
The inaugural Austrian grand prix was held in 1971 at the Salzburgring, where it stayed until 1994. In 1995, the Austrian GP was taken off the calendar because the Salzburgring was deemed too dangerous for racing., but would return in 1996 on the then-called Österreichring. In 1997, the Österreichring became the A1-Ring, named after the Austrian mobile network operator A1.

For the 1998 season, the Austrian round was scrapped, mainly due to the low number of spectators who visited the races.

After a 19-year absence, the Austrian Grand Prix returned in 2016 and currently takes place at the Red Bull Ring in Spielberg. The layout was changed, and a chicane was added before the 2022 race.

== Track gallery ==
The Salzburgring, used from 1971 to 1994.

The Grand Prix layout of the A1/Red Bull Ring, used in 1996–1997, and 2016–2021.

== Official names and sponsors ==
- 1971, 1986–1991: Großer Preis von Österreich (no official sponsor)
- 1972: Grosser Preis von Österreich (no official sponsor)
- 1973–1977: Austrian Grand Prix/Grosser Preis von Österreich (no official sponsor)
- 1978–1979, 1981–1985: Austrian Grand Prix/Großer Preis von Österreich (no official sponsor)
- 1993: Austrian Grand Prix (no official sponsor)
- 1994: Grand Prix Austria (no official sponsor)
- 1996: HB Motorrad Grand Prix Austria
- 1997, 2024: Motorrad Grand Prix von Österreich (no official sponsor)
- 2016–2017: NeroGiardini Motorrad Grand Prix von Österreich
- 2018: Eyetime Motorrad Grand Prix von Österreich
- 2019–2020: myWorld Motorrad Grand Prix von Österreich
- 2021: Bitci Motorrad Grand Prix von Österreich
- 2022–2023: CryptoData Motorrad Grand Prix von Österreich
- 2025: bwin Grand Prix of Austria
- 2026: Qatar Airways Grand Prix of Austria

== Winners ==
=== Multiple winners (riders) ===
# Wins	Rider	Wins	
# Wins	Rider	Category	Years won
6	(Italy) Giacomo Agostini	500cc	1971, 1972, 1974
6	(Italy) Giacomo Agostini	350cc	1971, 1972, 1974
6	(Spain) Ángel Nieto	125cc	1971, 1972, 1979, 1981, 1982, 1983
4	(Spain) Jorge Martínez	125cc	1988, 1990
4	(Spain) Jorge Martínez	80cc	1986, 1987
4	(Italy) Francesco Bagnaia	MotoGP	2022, 2023, 2024
4	(Italy) Francesco Bagnaia	Moto2	2018
3	(United States) Kenny Roberts	500cc	1978, 1979, 1983
3	(United States) Eddie Lawson	500cc	1984, 1986, 1988
3	(Italy) Fausto Gresini	125cc	1985, 1987, 1991
3	(United States) Kevin Schwantz	500cc	1989, 1990, 1993
3	(Australia) Mick Doohan	500cc	1991, 1994, 1997
3	(Italy) Andrea Dovizioso	MotoGP	2017, 2019, 2020
2	(Finland) Jarno Saarinen	500cc	1973
2	(Finland) Jarno Saarinen	250cc	1973
2	(Sweden) Kent Andersson	125cc	1973, 1974
2	(Japan) Hideo Kanaya	500cc	1975
2	(Japan) Hideo Kanaya	350cc	1975
2	(Italy) Eugenio Lazzarini	125cc	1977, 1978
2	(South Africa) Kork Ballington	350cc	1978, 1979
2	(United States) Freddie Spencer	500cc	1985
2	(United States) Freddie Spencer	250cc	1985
2	(Italy) Luca Cadalora	250cc	1990
2	(Italy) Luca Cadalora	125cc	1986
2	(Spain) Joan Mir	Moto3	2016, 2017
2	(South Africa) Brad Binder	MotoGP	2021
2	(South Africa) Brad Binder	Moto2	2019
2	(Italy) Mattia Casadei	MotoE	2023 Race 1, 2023 Race 2
2	(Italy) Celestino Vietti	Moto2	2023, 2024
2	(Italy) Matteo Ferrari	MotoE	2025 Race 1, 2025 Race 2

=== Multiple winners (manufacturers) ===
# Wins	Manufacturer	Wins	
# Wins	Manufacturer	Category	Years won
24	(Japan) Honda	500cc	1985, 1986, 1987, 1991, 1994, 1996, 1997
24	(Japan) Honda	250cc	1985, 1987, 1988, 1989, 1991, 1993, 1994, 1996, 1997
24	(Japan) Honda	Moto3	2017, 2019
24	(Japan) Honda	125cc	1989, 1991, 1993, 1994, 1996, 1997
19	(Japan) Yamaha	500cc	1973, 1974, 1975, 1978, 1979, 1983, 1984, 1988
19	(Japan) Yamaha	350cc	1973, 1974, 1975, 1976, 1981
19	(Japan) Yamaha	250cc	1973, 1984, 1986, 1990
19	(Japan) Yamaha	125cc	1973, 1974
15	(Italy) Ducati	MotoGP	2016, 2017, 2018, 2019, 2020, 2022, 2023, 2024, 2025
15	(Italy) Ducati	MotoE	2023 Race 1, 2023 Race 2, 2024 Race 1, 2024 Race 2, 2025 Race 1, 2025 Race 2
9	(Germany) Kalex	Moto2	2016, 2017, 2018, 2020, 2021, 2022, 2023, 2024, 2025
9	(Austria) KTM	MotoGP	2021, 2026
9	(Austria) KTM	Moto2	2019
9	(Austria) KTM	Moto3	2016, 2018, 2020, 2023, 2025, 2026
7	(Spain) Derbi	250cc	1972
7	(Spain) Derbi	125cc	1971, 1972, 1988, 1990
7	(Spain) Derbi	80cc	1986, 1987
7	(Japan) Suzuki	500cc	1976, 1977, 1981, 1982, 1989, 1990, 1993
5	(Italy) Garelli	125cc	1982, 1983, 1985, 1986, 1987
4	(Italy) MV Agusta	500cc	1971, 1972
4	(Italy) MV Agusta	350cc	1971, 1972
4	(Italy) Morbidelli	125cc	1975, 1976, 1977, 1978
2	(Japan) Kawasaki	350cc	1978, 1979
2	(Italy) Minarelli	125cc	1979, 1981

=== By year ===
A pink background indicates an event that was not part of the Grand Prix motorcycle racing championship.

Year	Track	Moto3		Moto2		MotoGP		Report
Year	Track	Rider	Manufacturer	Rider	Manufacturer	Rider	Manufacturer	Report
2026	Spielberg	(Spain) Máximo Quiles	KTM	(Spain) Izan Guevara	Boscoscuro	(Spain) Pedro Acosta	KTM	Report

Year	Track	MotoE				Moto3		Moto2		MotoGP		Report
Year	Track	Race 1		Race 2		Moto3		Moto2		MotoGP		Report
Year	Track	Rider	Manufacturer	Rider	Manufacturer	Rider	Manufacturer	Rider	Manufacturer	Rider	Manufacturer	Report
2025	Spielberg	(Italy) Matteo Ferrari	Ducati	(Italy) Matteo Ferrari	Ducati	(Spain) Ángel Piqueras	KTM	(Brazil) Diogo Moreira	Kalex	(Spain) Marc Márquez	Ducati	Report
2024	Spielberg	(Spain) Óscar Gutiérrez	Ducati	(Spain) Héctor Garzó	Ducati	(Colombia) David Alonso	CFMoto	(Italy) Celestino Vietti	Kalex	(Italy) Francesco Bagnaia	Ducati	Report
2023	Spielberg	(Italy) Mattia Casadei	Ducati	(Italy) Mattia Casadei	Ducati	(Turkey) Deniz Öncü	KTM	(Italy) Celestino Vietti	Kalex	(Italy) Francesco Bagnaia	Ducati	Report
2022	Spielberg	(Brazil) Eric Granado	Energica	(Brazil) Eric Granado	Energica	(Japan) Ayumu Sasaki	Husqvarna	(Japan) Ai Ogura	Kalex	(Italy) Francesco Bagnaia	Ducati	Report
2021	Spielberg	(Germany) Lukas Tulovic	Energica	—N/a		(Spain) Sergio García	GasGas	(Spain) Raúl Fernández	Kalex	(South Africa) Brad Binder	KTM	Report
2020	Spielberg	Cancelled due to COVID-19 concerns		—N/a		(Spain) Albert Arenas	KTM	(Spain) Jorge Martín	Kalex	(Italy) Andrea Dovizioso	Ducati	Report
2019	Spielberg	(France) Mike Di Meglio	Energica	—N/a		(Italy) Romano Fenati	Honda	(South Africa) Brad Binder	KTM	(Italy) Andrea Dovizioso	Ducati	Report

Year	Track	Moto3		Moto2		MotoGP		Report
Year	Track	Rider	Manufacturer	Rider	Manufacturer	Rider	Manufacturer	Report
2018	Spielberg	(Italy) Marco Bezzecchi	KTM	(Italy) Francesco Bagnaia	Kalex	(Spain) Jorge Lorenzo	Ducati	Report
2017	Spielberg	(Spain) Joan Mir	Honda	(Italy) Franco Morbidelli	Kalex	(Italy) Andrea Dovizioso	Ducati	Report
2016	Spielberg	(Spain) Joan Mir	KTM	(France) Johann Zarco	Kalex	(Italy) Andrea Iannone	Ducati	Report
Year	Track	125cc		250cc		500cc		Report
Year	Track	Rider	Manufacturer	Rider	Manufacturer	Rider	Manufacturer	Report
1997	Spielberg	(Japan) Noboru Ueda	Honda	(France) Olivier Jacque	Honda	(Australia) Mick Doohan	Honda	Report
1996	Spielberg	(Italy) Ivan Goi	Honda	(Germany) Ralf Waldmann	Honda	(Spain) Àlex Crivillé	Honda	Report
1994	Salzburgring	(Germany) Dirk Raudies	Honda	(Italy) Loris Capirossi	Honda	(Australia) Mick Doohan	Honda	Report
1993	Salzburgring	(Japan) Takeshi Tsujimura	Honda	(Italy) Doriano Romboni	Honda	(United States) Kevin Schwantz	Suzuki	Report
1991	Salzburgring	(Italy) Fausto Gresini	Honda	(Germany) Helmut Bradl	Honda	(Australia) Mick Doohan	Honda	Report
1990	Salzburgring	(Spain) Jorge Martínez	Derbi	(Italy) Luca Cadalora	Yamaha	(United States) Kevin Schwantz	Suzuki	Report

Year	Track	80cc		125cc		250cc		500cc		Report
Year	Track	Rider	Manufacturer	Rider	Manufacturer	Rider	Manufacturer	Rider	Manufacturer	Report
1989	Salzburgring			(Netherlands) Hans Spaan	Honda	(Spain) Sito Pons	Honda	(United States) Kevin Schwantz	Suzuki	Report
1988	Salzburgring			(Spain) Jorge Martínez	Derbi	(Switzerland) Jacques Cornu	Honda	(United States) Eddie Lawson	Yamaha	Report
1987	Salzburgring	(Spain) Jorge Martínez	Derbi	(Italy) Fausto Gresini	Garelli	(West Germany) Anton Mang	Honda	(Australia) Wayne Gardner	Honda	Report
1986	Salzburgring	(Spain) Jorge Martínez	Derbi	(Italy) Luca Cadalora	Garelli	(Venezuela) Carlos Lavado	Yamaha	(United States) Eddie Lawson	Honda	Report
1985	Salzburgring			(Italy) Fausto Gresini	Garelli	(United States) Freddie Spencer	Honda	(United States) Freddie Spencer	Honda	Report
1984	Salzburgring	(Switzerland) Stefan Dörflinger	Zündapp			(France) Christian Sarron	Yamaha	(United States) Eddie Lawson	Yamaha	Report
Year	Track	50cc		125cc		250cc		500cc		Report
Year	Track	Rider	Manufacturer	Rider	Manufacturer	Rider	Manufacturer	Rider	Manufacturer	Report
1983	Salzburgring			(Spain) Ángel Nieto	Garelli	(West Germany) Manfred Herweh	Real-Rotax	(United States) Kenny Roberts	Yamaha	Report

Year	Track	50cc		125cc		250cc		350cc		500cc		Report
Year	Track	Rider	Manufacturer	Rider	Manufacturer	Rider	Manufacturer	Rider	Manufacturer	Rider	Manufacturer	Report
1982	Salzburgring			(Spain) Ángel Nieto	Garelli			(France) Éric Saul	Chevallier-Yamaha	(Italy) Franco Uncini	Suzuki	Report
1981	Salzburgring			(Spain) Ángel Nieto	Minarelli			(France) Patrick Fernandez	Yamaha	(United States) Randy Mamola	Suzuki	Report
1979	Salzburgring			(Spain) Ángel Nieto	Minarelli			(South Africa) Kork Ballington	Kawasaki	(United States) Kenny Roberts	Yamaha	Report
1978	Salzburgring			(Italy) Eugenio Lazzarini	Morbidelli			(South Africa) Kork Ballington	Kawasaki	(United States) Kenny Roberts	Yamaha	Report
1977	Salzburgring			(Italy) Eugenio Lazzarini	Morbidelli			Race cancelled (Note: The 1977 350cc race was cancelled after a crash that led to the death of Hans Stadelmann.)		(Australia) Jack Findlay	Suzuki	Report
1976	Salzburgring			(Italy) Pier Paolo Bianchi	Morbidelli			(Venezuela) Johnny Cecotto	Yamaha	(United Kingdom) Barry Sheene	Suzuki	Report
1975	Salzburgring			(Italy) Paolo Pileri	Morbidelli			(Japan) Hideo Kanaya	Yamaha	(Japan) Hideo Kanaya	Yamaha	Report
1974	Salzburgring			(Sweden) Kent Andersson	Yamaha			(Italy) Giacomo Agostini	Yamaha	(Italy) Giacomo Agostini	Yamaha	Report
1973	Salzburgring			(Sweden) Kent Andersson	Yamaha	(Finland) Jarno Saarinen	Yamaha	(Hungary) János Drapál	Yamaha	(Finland) Jarno Saarinen	Yamaha	Report
1972	Salzburgring			(Spain) Ángel Nieto	Derbi	(Sweden) Börje Jansson	Derbi	(Italy) Giacomo Agostini	MV Agusta	(Italy) Giacomo Agostini	MV Agusta	Report
1971	Salzburgring	(Netherlands) Jan de Vries	Kreidler	(Spain) Ángel Nieto	Derbi	(Italy) Silvio Grassetti	MZ	(Italy) Giacomo Agostini	MV Agusta	(Italy) Giacomo Agostini	MV Agusta	Report

Footnotes
