= List of Grand Prix motorcycle racers: B =

Name	Seasons	World Championships	MotoGP Wins	500cc Wins	350cc Wins	Moto2 Wins	250cc Wins	Moto3 Wins	125cc Wins	80cc Wins	50cc Wins	MotoE Wins
(Sweden) Lennart Bäckström	1980-1981	0	0	0	0	0	0	0	0	0	0	0
(Malaysia) Farid Badrul	2011	0	0	0	0	0	0	0	0	0	0	0
(Belgium) Chris Baert	1981	0	0	0	0	0	0	0	0	0	0	0
(Italy) Francesco Bagnaia	2013-	3 Moto2 - 2018; MotoGP - 2022-2023	31	0	0	8	0	2	0	0	0	0
(United Kingdom) Graham Bailey	1973	0	0	0	0	0	0	0	0	0	0	0
(United States) Steve Baker	1977-1978	0	0	0	0	0	0	0	0	0	0	0
(Czechoslovakia) Peter Balaz	1975, 1979	0	0	0	0	0	0	0	0	0	0	0
(Italy) Romolo Balbi	1989-1991	0	0	0	0	0	0	0	0	0	0	0
(Italy) Lorenzo Baldassarri	2013-2021, 2023, 2025	0	0	0	0	5	0	0	0	0	0	0
(France) Jean-François Baldé	1973, 1975-1988	0	0	0	3	0	2	0	0	0	0	0
(Germany) Mike Baldinger	1998	0	0	0	0	0	0	0	0	0	0	0
(Italy) Alex Baldolini	2000, 2002-2011	0	0	0	0	0	0	0	0	0	0	0
(United States) Mike Baldwin	1979, 1985-1988	0	0	0	0	0	0	0	0	0	0	0
(United Kingdom) Brian Ball	1968	0	0	0	0	0	0	0	0	0	0	0
(Italy) Andrea Ballerini	1995-1996, 1998, 2001-2006	0	0	0	0	0	0	0	1	0	0	0
(South Africa) Kork Ballington	1976-1982	4; 350cc - 1978-1979; 250cc - 1978-1979	0	0	14	0	17	0	0	0	0	0
(Germany) Hans Baltisberger	1952, 1954-1956	0	0	0	0	0	0	0	0	0	0	0
(Belgium) Barry Baltus	2020-	0	0	0	0	0	0	0	0	0	0	0
(Italy) Carlo Bandirola	1950-1956, 1958	0	0	0	0	0	0	0	0	0	0	0
(France) Alain Barbaroux	1965	0	0	0	0	0	0	0	0	0	0	0
(Spain) Héctor Barberá	2002-2018	0	0	0	0	0	4	0	6	0	0	0
(France) Robin Barbosa	2010	0	0	0	0	0	0	0	0	0	0	0
(Italy) Fabio Barchitta	1988	0	0	0	0	0	0	0	0	0	0	0
(United Kingdom) Alan Barnett	1969-1971	0	0	0	0	0	0	0	0	0	0	0
(Italy) Lorenzo Baroni	2005-2006	0	0	0	0	0	0	0	0	0	0	0
(Spain) Santiago Barragan	2006-2007	0	0	0	0	0	0	0	0	0	0	0
(Venezuela) Jose Barresi	1990-1991	0	0	0	0	0	0	0	0	0	0	0
(Republic of Ireland) Manliff Barrington	1949, 1951	0	0	0	0	0	1	0	0	0	0	0
(Brazil) Alex Barros	1986-1987, 1989-2005	0	3	4	0	0	0	0	0	0	0	0
(United Kingdom) Geoff Barry	1974-1975	0	0	0	0	0	0	0	0	0	0	0
(Germany) Hans Bartl	1955-1956	0	0	0	0	0	0	0	0	0	0	0
(Austria) Harald Bartol	1970-1980	0	0	0	0	0	0	0	0	0	0	0
(Italy) Elia Bartolini	2019, 2021-2022	0	0	0	0	0	0	0	0	0	0	0
(United Kingdom) Darren Barton	1995-1997	0	0	0	0	0	0	0	0	0	0	0
(Australia) Matt Barton	2015-2016	0	0	0	0	0	0	0	0	0	0	0
(Czechoslovakia) František Bartoš	1956-1957	0	0	0	0	0	0	0	0	0	0	0
(East Germany) Günter Bartusch	1968-1971	0	0	0	0	0	0	0	0	0	0	0
(Italy) Axel Bassani	2017	0	0	0	0	0	0	0	0	0	0	0
(Italy) Enea Bastianini	2014-	1 Moto2 - 2020	7	0	0	3	0	3	0	0	0	0
(France) Eric Bataille	2000-2004	0	0	0	0	0	0	0	0	0	0	0
(Italy) Franco Battaini	1996-2006, 2012	0	0	0	0	0	0	0	0	0	0	0
(Germany) Gerhard Bauer	1981-1983	0	0	0	0	0	0	0	0	0	0	0
(Austria) Martin Bauer	2013	0	0	0	0	0	0	0	0	0	0	0
(Austria) Manfred Baumann	1993	0	0	0	0	0	0	0	0	0	0	0
(Portugal) Sérgio Batista	2007	0	0	0	0	0	0	0	0	0	0	0
(Spain) Alvaro Bautista	2002-2018, 2023	1; 125cc - 2006	0	0	0	0	8	0	8	0	0	0
(Italy) Lenfranco Baviera	1954	0	0	0	0	0	0	0	0	0	0	0
(Germany) Richard Bay	1985, 1987	0	0	0	0	0	0	0	0	0	0	0
(France) Jean-Michel Bayle	1992-1999, 2002	0	0	0	0	0	0	0	0	0	0	0
(France) Jean-Pierre Bayle	1956	0	0	0	0	0	0	0	0	0	0	0
(United Kingdom) Len Bayliss	1950	0	0	0	0	0	0	0	0	0	0	0
(Australia) Troy Bayliss	1997, 2003-2006	0	1	0	0	0	0	0	0	0	0	0
(France) Loris Baz	2015-2018	0	0	0	0	0	0	0	0	0	0	0
(United States) J.D. Beach	2011	0	0	0	0	0	0	0	0	0	0	0
(Rhodesia) Bruce Beale	1964-1966	0	0	0	0	0	0	0	0	0	0	0
(United Kingdom) Douglas Beasley	1949, 1951	0	0	0	0	0	0	0	0	0	0	0
(Australia) Daryl Beattie	1989-1990, 1992-1997	0	0	3	0	0	0	0	0	0	0	0
(United States) Cameron Beaubier	2009, 2021-2022	0	0	0	0	0	0	0	0	0	0	0
(Italy) Leandro Beccheroni	1978, 1982, 1984	0	0	0	0	0	0	0	0	0	0	0
(Germany) Hans Becker	1988-1989, 1991	0	0	0	0	0	0	0	0	0	0	0
(Germany) Marcel Becker	2009	0	0	0	0	0	0	0	0	0	0	0
(United Kingdom) Alex Bedford	1982, 1984, 1988-1989	0	0	0	0	0	0	0	0	0	0	0
(Germany) Günter Beer	1957-1960, 1962, 1965-1966	0	0	0	0	0	0	0	0	0	0	0
(United Kingdom) Connor Behan	2008	0	0	0	0	0	0	0	0	0	0	0
(Germany) Albert Beirle	1964	0	0	0	0	0	0	0	0	0	0	0
(Netherlands) Ronald Beitler	2007	0	0	0	0	0	0	0	0	0	0	0
(Venezuela) Carlos Bellon	1977	0	0	0	0	0	0	0	0	0	0	0
(Republic of Ireland) Artie Bell	1949-1950	0	0	0	0	0	0	0	0	0	0	0
(Italy) Carlo Bellotti	1950	0	0	0	0	0	0	0	0	0	0	0
(France) Jean-Pierre Beltoise	1962-1964	0	0	0	0	0	0	0	0	0	0	0
(Italy) Felice Benasedo	1950	0	0	0	0	0	0	0	0	0	0	0
(Germany) Gert Bender	1971-1981	0	0	0	0	0	0	0	0	0	0	0
(Netherlands) Bo Bendsneyder	2016-2024	0	0	0	0	0	0	0	0	0	0	0
(Sweden) Ingemar Bengtsson	1974	0	0	0	0	0	0	0	0	0	0	0
(Sweden) Johnny Bengtsson	1971-1972, 1975	0	0	0	0	0	0	0	0	0	0	0
(France) Morgan Berchet	2010	0	0	0	0	0	0	0	0	0	0	0
(Italy) Angelo Bergamonti	1967-1970	0	0	1	1	0	0	0	0	0	0	0
(Austria) Werner Bergold	1969	0	0	0	0	0	0	0	0	0	0	0
(Belgium) Jacques Bernard	1987-1989	0	0	0	0	0	0	0	0	0	0	0
(Italy) Luca Bernardi	2025	0	0	0	0	0	0	0	0	0	0	0
(Socialist Federal Republic of Yugoslavia) Adrian Bernetic	1969, 1972-1973, 1977	0	0	0	0	0	0	0	0	0	0	0
(Germany) Manfred Bernsee	1970	0	0	0	0	0	0	0	0	0	0	0
(Italy) Bruno Bertacchini	1949	0	0	0	0	0	0	0	0	0	0	0
(Italy) Silvano Bertarelli	1968-1970, 1972	0	0	0	0	0	0	0	0	0	0	0
(Italy) Matteo Bertelle	2021-	0	0	0	0	0	0	0	0	0	0	0
(Switzerland) Albert Bertholet	1971-1972	0	0	0	0	0	0	0	0	0	0	0
(France) Guy Bertin	1977-1988	0	0	0	0	0	0	0	0	6	0	0
(Italy) Franco Bertoni	1949, 1951, 1954	0	0	0	0	0	0	0	0	0	0	0
(Spain) Juan Bertran	1954	0	0	0	0	0	0	0	0	0	0	0
(Germany) Willi Bertsch	1954	0	0	0	0	0	0	0	0	0	0	0
(United Kingdom) Paul Berwick	1970-1971	0	0	0	0	0	0	0	0	0	0	0
(Netherlands) Kees Besseling	1985	0	0	0	0	0	0	0	0	0	0	0
(Italy) Marco Bezzecchi	2015-	0	12	0	0	3	0	3	0	0	0	0
(Italy) Federico Biaggi	2007	0	0	0	0	0	0	0	0	0	0	0
(Italy) Max Biaggi	1991-2005	4; 250cc - 1994-1997	5	8	0	0	29	0	0	0	0	0
(Italy) Pier Paolo Bianchi	1973-1988	3; 125cc - 1976-1977, 1980	0	0	0	0	0	0	24	3	0	0
(Italy) Stefano Bianco	2000, 2002-2004, 2007-2008	0	0	0	0	0	0	0	0	0	0	0
(Poland) Piotr Biesiekirski	2020-2022	0	0	0	0	0	0	0	0	0	0	0
(Netherlands) Pepijn Bijsterbosch	2009-2010	0	0	0	0	0	0	0	0	0	0	0
(Republic of Ireland) Wilf Billington	1950	0	0	0	0	0	0	0	0	0	0	0
(South Africa) Brad Binder	2011-	1 Moto3 - 2016	2	0	0	8	0	7	0	0	0	0
(South Africa) Darryn Binder	2015-2025	0	0	0	0	0	0	1	0	0	0	0
(East Germany) Hartmut Bischoff	1966-1972	0	0	0	0	0	0	0	0	0	0	0
(Uruguay) Gastone Biscia	1963, 1965	0	0	0	0	0	0	0	0	0	0	0
(United Kingdom) Norman Black	1966	0	0	0	0	0	0	0	0	0	0	0
(Australia) Kenny Blake	1978-1979	0	0	0	0	0	0	0	0	0	0	0
(United Kingdom) John Blanchard	1966-1967	0	0	0	0	0	0	0	0	0	0	0
(Spain) Ramiro Blanco	1966	0	0	0	0	0	0	0	0	0	0	0
(Switzerland) Rolf Blatter	1973-1982	0	0	0	0	0	0	0	0	0	0	0
(Republic of Ireland) Norman Blemings	1951	0	0	0	0	0	0	0	0	0	0	0
(Czechoslovakia) František Bartoš	1965-1966	0	0	0	0	0	0	0	0	0	0	0
(Netherlands) Loek Bodelier	1994-1996	0	0	0	0	0	0	0	0	0	0	0
(Netherlands) Jorel Boerboom	2015	0	0	0	0	0	0	0	0	0	0	0
(Netherlands) Jarno Boesveld	2001	0	0	0	0	0	0	0	0	0	0	0
(France) Jean-Paul Boinet	1973-1974	0	0	0	0	0	0	0	0	0	0	0
(Czechoslovakia) Karel Bojer	1969-1970	0	0	0	0	0	0	0	0	0	0	0
(Spain) Juan Bolart	1985-1987	0	0	0	0	0	0	0	0	0	0	0
(Germany) Gerhard Böll	1980	0	0	0	0	0	0	0	0	0	0	0
(France) Jacques Bolle	1980-1984	0	0	0	0	0	1	0	0	0	0	0
(France) Pierre Bolle	1981-1982, 1985-1986	0	0	0	0	0	0	0	0	0	0	0
(Netherlands) Maurice Bolwerk	1997	0	0	0	0	0	0	0	0	0	0	0
(Italy) Giovanni Bonati	2010	0	0	0	0	0	0	0	0	0	0	0
(Italy) Gianfranco Bonera	1973-1979	0	0	1	0	0	1	0	0	0	0	0
(France) Bruno Bonhuil	1986-1989, 1992-1995	0	0	0	0	0	0	0	0	0	0	0
(Spain) Ismael Bonilla	1996-2001	0	0	0	0	0	0	0	0	0	0	0
(United States) Steve Bonsey	2007-2009	0	0	0	0	0	0	0	0	0	0	0
(United Kingdom) Tom Booth-Amos	2017, 2019	0	0	0	0	0	0	0	0	0	0	0
(France) Paul Bordes	1979, 1983-1989	0	0	0	0	0	0	0	0	0	0	0
(Spain) Juan Bordons	1967, 1969-1971, 1973	0	0	0	0	0	0	0	0	0	0	0
(Italy) Andrea Borgonovo	1990	0	0	0	0	0	0	0	0	0	0	0
(Soviet Union) Eduard Borisenko	1972	0	0	0	0	0	0	0	0	0	0	0
(Spain) Juan Borja	1992-1999	0	0	0	0	0	0	0	0	0	0	0
(Italy) Sergio Boroncini	1972	0	0	0	0	0	0	0	0	0	0	0
(Italy) Gino Borsoi	1996-2004	0	0	0	0	0	0	0	0	0	0	0
(Italy) Luca Boscoscuro	1995-2001	0	0	0	0	0	0	0	0	0	0	0
(Italy) Gimmi Bosio	1991	0	0	0	0	0	0	0	0	0	0	0
(Netherlands) Juup Bosman	1975, 1977	0	0	0	0	0	0	0	0	0	0	0
(Switzerland) Adrian Bosshard	1992-1996	0	0	0	0	0	0	0	0	0	0	0
(United States) Ben Bostrom	2011	0	0	0	0	0	0	0	0	0	0	0
(United States) Eric Bostrom	?	0	0	0	0	0	0	0	0	0	0	0
(France) Christian Boudinot	1986-1988, 1994, 1996	0	0	0	0	0	0	0	0	0	0	0
(United Kingdom) Roy Boughey	1964	0	0	0	0	0	0	0	0	0	0	0
(France) Dennis Boulom	1977	0	0	0	0	0	0	0	0	0	0	0
(France) Enzo Boulom	2016	0	0	0	0	0	0	0	0	0	0	0
(France) Christian Bourgeois	1970, 1972-1974, 1976	0	0	0	0	0	0	0	0	0	0	0
(France) Philippe Bouzanne	1975-1977	0	0	0	0	0	0	0	0	0	0	0
(United Kingdom) Ellis Boyce	1962	0	0	0	0	0	0	0	0	0	0	0
(Germany) Helmut Bradl	1986-1993	0	0	0	0	0	5	0	0	0	0	0
(Germany) Stefan Bradl	2005-2016, 2018-2024	1 Moto2 - 2011	0	0	0	5	0	0	2	0	0	0
(Italy) Umberto Braga	1949-1950	0	0	0	0	0	0	0	0	0	0	0
(Switzerland) Stefan Brägger	1988-1989	0	0	0	0	0	0	0	0	0	0	0
(Switzerland) Vincent Braillard	2002, 2005-2006	0	0	0	0	0	0	0	0	0	0	0
(Italy) Ernesto Brambilla	1959, 1961	0	0	0	0	0	0	0	0	0	0	0
(Germany) Wolfgang Brand	1953, 1955	0	0	0	0	0	0	0	0	0	0	0
(Italy) Alessanro Brannetti	1999-2002, 2006	0	0	0	0	0	0	0	0	0	0	0
(Germany) Reiner Bratenstein	1973	0	0	0	0	0	0	0	0	0	0	0
(Austria) Hans Braumandl	1975	0	0	0	0	0	0	0	0	0	0	0
(Germany) Dieter Braun	1968-1976	2; 250cc - 1973; 125cc - 1970	0	0	1	0	7	0	6	0	0	0
(Germany) Georg Braun	1953-1954	0	0	0	0	0	0	0	0	0	0	0
(East Germany) Walter Brehme	1958, 1961	0	0	0	0	0	0	0	0	0	0	0
(United Kingdom) Jack Brett	1951-1957	0	0	2	0	0	0	0	0	0	0	0
(Italy) Domenico Brigaglia	1982, 1984-1990	0	0	0	0	0	0	0	1	0	0	0
(Cuba) Aramis Brito	1971-1972	0	0	0	0	0	0	0	0	0	0	0
(Italy) Massimo Broccoli	1982, 1984, 1988-1989	0	0	0	0	0	0	0	0	0	0	0
(Sweden) Bo Brolin	1973	0	0	0	0	0	0	0	0	0	0	0
(Netherlands) Rob Bron	1970-1973, 1976	0	0	0	0	0	0	0	0	0	0	0
(France) Alain Bronec	1989, 1991	0	0	0	0	0	0	0	0	0	0	0
(Australia) Bob Brown	1955-1960	0	0	0	0	0	0	0	0	0	0	0
(United Kingdom) Clive Brown	1972	0	0	0	0	0	0	0	0	0	0	0
(United Kingdom) Deane Brown	2010	0	0	0	0	0	0	0	0	0	0	0
(United States) Douglas Brown	1964	0	0	0	0	0	0	0	0	0	0	0
(United Kingdom) George Brown	1952	0	0	0	0	0	0	0	0	0	0	0
(Netherlands) Jan Bruins	1970-1975	0	0	0	0	0	0	0	0	0	1	0
(Switzerland) Hans-Rudi Brüngger	1971	0	0	0	0	0	0	0	0	0	0	0
(United Kingdom) Ralph Bryans	1963-1967	1; 50cc - 1965	0	0	1	0	2	0	0	0	7	0
(Australia) Keith Bryen	1956-1957	0	0	0	0	0	0	0	0	0	0	0
(Thailand) Tatchakorn Buasri	2023-2025	0	0	0	0	0	0	0	0	0	0	0
(New Zealand) Cormac Buchanan	2025-	0	0	0	0	0	0	0	0	0	0	0
(United Kingdom) Simon Buckmaster	1989, 1991	0	0	0	0	0	0	0	0	0	0	0
(Italy) Gianfranco Buffarello	1972	0	0	0	0	0	0	0	0	0	0	0
(Switzerland) Maurice Büla	1956	0	0	0	0	0	0	0	0	0	0	0
(Italy) Davide Bulega	1993-1998	0	0	0	0	0	0	0	0	0	0	0
(Italy) Nicolò Bulega	2015-2021, 2025	0	0	0	0	0	0	0	0	0	0	0
(France) Louis Bulle	2015	0	0	0	0	0	0	0	0	0	0	0
(Netherlands) Theo Bult	1970-1971	0	0	0	0	0	0	0	0	0	0	0
(Spain) Juan-Soler Bulto	1951	0	0	0	0	0	0	0	0	0	0	0
(United States) Steve Bunckner	1965	0	0	0	0	0	0	0	0	0	0	0
(Italy) Giovanni Burlando	1967	0	0	0	0	0	0	0	0	0	0	0
(United Kingdom) Frank Burman	1952	0	0	0	0	0	0	0	0	0	0	0
(South Africa) Ian Burne	1965	0	0	0	0	0	0	0	0	0	0	0
(United Kingdom) Roger Burnett	1984-1989	0	0	0	0	0	0	0	0	0	0	0
(United Kingdom) Arthur Burton	1950	0	0	0	0	0	0	0	0	0	0	0
(Italy) Otello Buscherini	1970-1976	0	0	0	1	0	0	0	2	0	0	0
(Spain) Jose-Maria Busquet	1962-1965, 1967	0	0	0	0	0	0	0	0	0	0	0
(United Kingdom) Rex Butcher	1968	0	0	0	0	0	0	0	0	0	0	0
(Germany) Hans-Otto Butenuth	1970-1971	0	0	0	0	0	0	0	0	0	0	0
(Germany) Hans-Jörg Butz	1990	0	0	0	0	0	0	0	0	0	0	0
(United Kingdom) Shane Byrne	2004-2005	0	0	0	0	0	0	0	0	0	0	0
(South Africa) Paul Brady	1995-2005	0	0	0	0	0	0	0	0	0	0	0
