= List of 500cc/MotoGP riders who set a fastest lap =

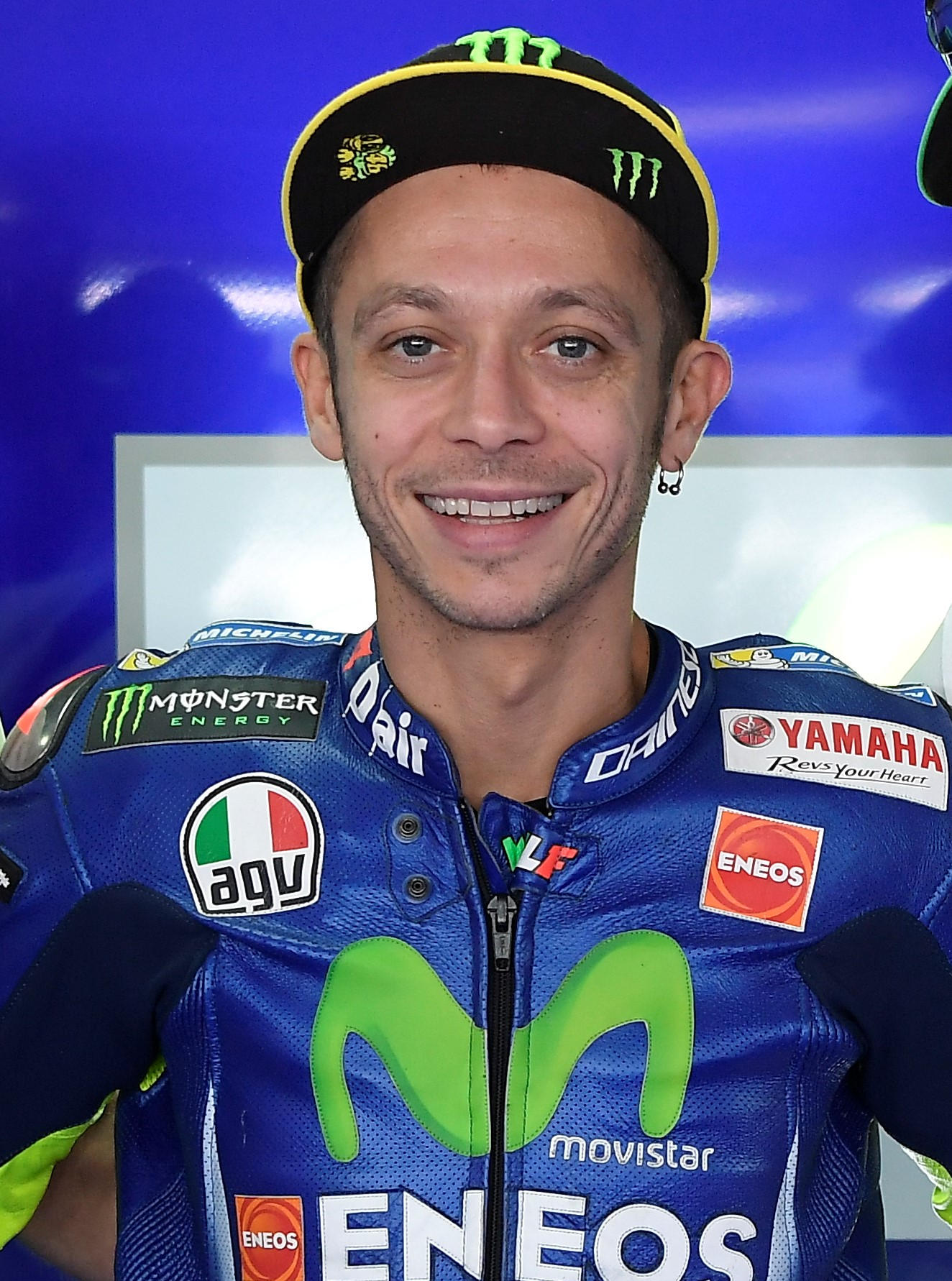
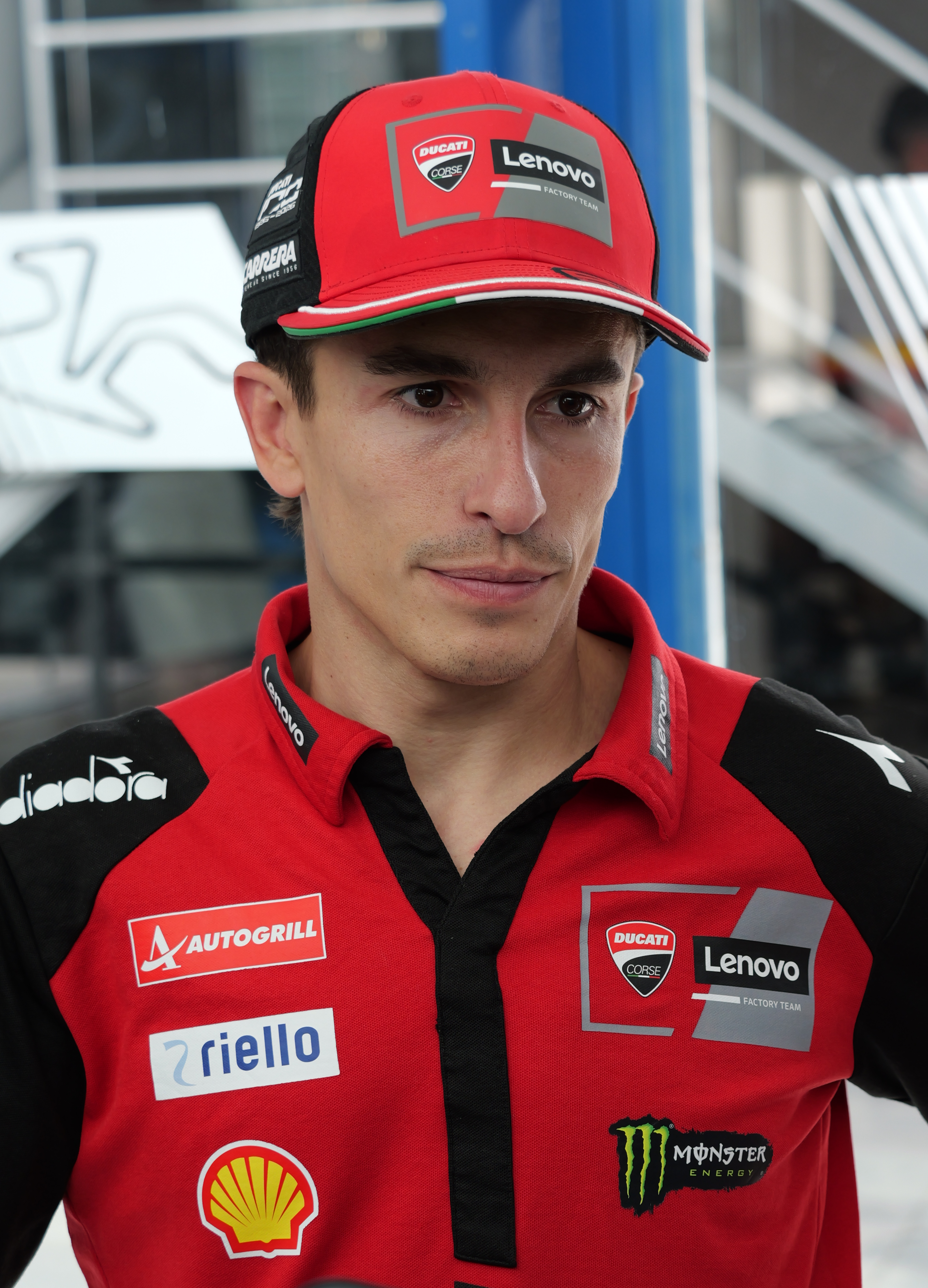
Valentino Rossi and Marc Márquez are tied for the most race fastest laps recorded in the premier 500cc/MotoGP class, with 76 each.

Grand Prix motorcycle racing is the premier championship of motorcycle road racing, which has been divided into three classes: MotoGP, Moto2, and Moto3. Former classes that have been discontinued include 350cc, 250cc, 125cc, 50cc/80cc, MotoE, and Sidecar. The premier class is MotoGP, which was formerly known as the 500cc class. The Grand Prix Road-Racing World Championship was established in 1949 by the sport's governing body, the Fédération Internationale de Motocyclisme (FIM), and is the oldest motorsport world championship in existence.

Valentino Rossi and Marc Márquez are tied for the most race fastest laps recorded in the premier 500cc/MotoGP class, with 76 each. Giacomo Agostini is third with 70 fastest laps.

== By rider ==
As of the 2026 MotoGP Portuguese Grand Prix

Key
*	MotoGP/500cc World Champion
†	Grand Prix World Champion
**Bold**	Rider has competed in the 2026 MotoGP season

Grand Prix motorcycle racing fastest lap runners
Rank	Country	Rider	Fastest laps	Seasons active in MotoGP/500cc	First fastest lap	Last fastest lap
1	ITA	Valentino Rossi*	76	2000–2021	2000 500cc South African Grand Prix	2019 MotoGP Malaysian Grand Prix
1	ESP	**Marc Márquez***	76	2013–	2013 MotoGP Qatar Grand Prix	2026 MotoGP Qatar Grand Prix
3	ITA	Giacomo Agostini*	70	1965–1977	1965 500cc Finnish Grand Prix	1977 500cc French Grand Prix
4	AUS	Mick Doohan*	46	1989–1999	1990 500cc Spanish Grand Prix	1999 500cc Japanese Grand Prix
5	ESP	Dani Pedrosa†	44	2006–2018; 2021; 2023–2024	2006 MotoGP Chinese Grand Prix	2017 MotoGP Aragon Grand Prix
6	UK	Mike Hailwood*	37	1958–1967	1962 500cc Dutch TT	1967 500cc Canadian Grand Prix
7	ESP	Jorge Lorenzo*	30	2008–2019	2008 MotoGP Portuguese Grand Prix	2018 MotoGP Czech Republic Grand Prix
8	AUS	Casey Stoner*	29	2006–2012	2007 MotoGP Qatar Grand Prix	2012 MotoGP Australian Grand Prix
9	USA	Kevin Schwantz*	26	1986–1995	1988 500cc Japanese Grand Prix	1994 500cc British Grand Prix
10	USA	Kenny Roberts*	24	1978–1983	1978 500cc Spanish Grand Prix	1983 500cc San Marino Grand Prix
11	USA	Wayne Rainey*	22	1988–1993	1989 500cc Yugoslavian Grand Prix	1993 500cc Czech Republic Grand Prix
11	ITA	**Francesco Bagnaia***	22	2019–	2020 MotoGP San Marino Grand Prix	2026 MotoGP Italian Grand Prix
13	UK	Geoff Duke*	21	1950–1959	1950 500cc Isle of Man TT	1958 500cc Swedish Grand Prix
13	USA	Eddie Lawson*	21	1983–1992	1984 500cc Spanish Grand Prix	1989 500cc Brazilian Grand Prix
15	UK	John Surtees*	20	1952; 1954–1960	1956 500cc Isle of Man TT	1960 500cc Nations Grand Prix
16	AUS	Wayne Gardner*	19	1983–1992	1985 500cc Dutch TT	1992 500cc South African Grand Prix
17	UK	Barry Sheene*	18	1974–1984	1975 500cc Dutch TT	1984 500cc South African Grand Prix
17	USA	Freddie Spencer*	18	1980–1987; 1989; 1993	1982 500cc Nations Grand Prix	1985 500cc Swedish Grand Prix
19	ESP	Àlex Crivillé*	14	1992–2001	1995 500cc Dutch TT	2000 500cc Valencian Grand Prix
19	BRA	Alex Barros	14	1990–2005; 2007	1992 500cc Hungarian Grand Prix	2005 MotoGP Chinese Grand Prix
19	ITA	Max Biaggi†	14	1998–2005	1998 500cc Japanese Grand Prix	2005 MotoGP Italian Grand Prix
22	FRA	**Fabio Quartararo***	13	2019–	2019 MotoGP Qatar Grand Prix	2022 MotoGP German Grand Prix
23	USA	Randy Mamola	12	1979–1990; 1992	1980 500cc Dutch TT	1987 500cc San Marino Grand Prix
23	ESP	**Maverick Viñales**†	12	2015–	2016 MotoGP Catalan Grand Prix	2024 MotoGP Grand Prix of the Americas
25	ITA	Andrea Dovizioso†	11	2008–2022	2010 MotoGP Catalan Grand Prix	2019 MotoGP Austrian Grand Prix
25	FRA	**Johann Zarco**†	11	2017–	2017 MotoGP Qatar Grand Prix	2023 MotoGP Japanese Grand Prix
27	RAN	Gary Hocking*	10	1958–1959; 1961–1962	1961 500cc West German Grand Prix	1962 500cc Isle of Man TT
27	ITA	Loris Capirossi†	10	1995–1996; 2000–2011	2000 500cc Italian Grand Prix	2006 MotoGP Valencian Grand Prix
27	ITA	**Enea Bastianini**†	10	2021–	2021 MotoGP San Marino Grand Prix	2026 MotoGP Japanese Grand Prix
27	ITA	**Marco Bezzecchi**	10	2022–	2023 MotoGP Argentine Grand Prix	2026 MotoGP Portuguese Grand Prix
31	ITA	Marco Lucchinelli*	9	1975–1986	1976 500cc French Grand Prix	1982 500cc Austrian Grand Prix
31	USA	Kenny Roberts Jr.*	9	1996–2007	1999 500cc French Grand Prix	2006 MotoGP Portuguese Grand Prix
33	ESP	Sete Gibernau	8	1997–2006; 2009	1999 500cc Catalan Grand Prix	2005 MotoGP German Grand Prix
33	ESP	**Álex Márquez**†	8	2020–	2023 MotoGP Italian Grand Prix	2026 MotoGP Spanish Grand Prix
35	JPN	Tadayuki Okada	7	1996–2000; 2008	1996 500cc Malaysian Grand Prix	2000 500cc German Grand Prix
35	USA	Nicky Hayden*	7	2003–2016	2005 MotoGP Malaysian Grand Prix	2011 MotoGP British Grand Prix
35	ESP	**Álex Rins**	7	2017–	2018 MotoGP Malaysian Grand Prix	2023 MotoGP Grand Prix of the Americas
38	UK	Leslie Graham*	6	1949–1953	1949 500cc Isle of Man TT	1952 500cc Nations Grand Prix
38	FRA	Christian Sarron†	6	1979; 1981; 1985–1990	1985 500cc German Grand Prix	1989 500cc Swedish Grand Prix
38	ITA	Luca Cadalora†	6	1989; 1993–2000	1993 500cc British Grand Prix	1996 500cc Spanish Grand Prix
38	ESP	**Jorge Martín***	6	2021–	2022 MotoGP Austrian Grand Prix	2024 MotoGP Japanese Grand Prix
42	FIN	Teuvo Länsivuori	5	1974–1978	1974 500cc Swedish Grand Prix	1976 500cc Czechoslovak Grand Prix
42	ESP	Carlos Checa	5	1995–2007; 2010	1995 500cc European Grand Prix	2002 MotoGP Rio de Janeiro Grand Prix
42	ESP	**Aleix Espargaró**	5	2009–2010; 2012–2026	2022 MotoGP Argentine Grand Prix	2024 MotoGP British Grand Prix
42	ESP	**Pedro Acosta**†	5	2024–	2024 MotoGP Qatar Grand Prix	2026 MotoGP Malaysian Grand Prix
46	VEN	Johnny Cecotto†	4	1976–1980	1977 500cc Finnish Grand Prix	1978 500cc Finnish Grand Prix
46	USA	John Kocinski†	4	1989; 1991–1994; 1998–1999	1991 500cc Japanese Grand Prix	1994 500cc United States Grand Prix
46	UK	**Cal Crutchlow**	4	2011–2023; 2026	2012 MotoGP Spanish Grand Prix	2016 MotoGP Australian Grand Prix
46	ZAF	**Brad Binder**†	4	2020–	2020 MotoGP Czech Republic Grand Prix	2023 MotoGP Valencian Grand Prix
50	ITA	Alfredo Milani	3	1950–1957	1951 500cc French Grand Prix	1951 500cc Belgian Grand Prix
50	SRA	Ray Amm	3	1951–1954	1953 500cc Isle of Man TT	1954 500cc Isle of Man TT
50	AUS	Ken Kavanagh	3	1951–1955; 1959	1953 500cc Ulster Grand Prix	1954 500cc Spanish Grand Prix
50	UK	Bob McIntyre	3	1954–1961	1957 500cc German Grand Prix	1961 500cc Isle of Man TT
50	FIN	Jarno Saarinen†	3	1973	1973 500cc French Grand Prix	1973 500cc West German Grand Prix
50	UK	Phil Read*	3	1961–1964; 1971; 1973–1976	1964 500cc Ulster Grand Prix	1974 500cc Belgian Grand Prix
50	ITA	Virginio Ferrari	3	1976–1985	1978 500cc German Grand Prix	1979 500cc French Grand Prix
50	JPN	Tohru Ukawa	3	2001–2005	2001 500cc Japanese Grand Prix	2002 MotoGP Italian Grand Prix
50	USA	Colin Edwards	3	2003–2014	2004 MotoGP British Grand Prix	2005 MotoGP United States Grand Prix
50	ITA	Marco Melandri†	3	2003–2010; 2015	2005 MotoGP Australian Grand Prix	2005 MotoGP Valencian Grand Prix
50	ESP	Toni Elías†	3	2005–2009; 2011–2012; 2015	2006 MotoGP Turkish Grand Prix	2007 MotoGP Japanese Grand Prix
50	ITA	Andrea Iannone	3	2013–2019; 2024	2015 MotoGP Grand Prix of the Americas	2016 MotoGP Austrian Grand Prix
50	AUS	**Jack Miller**	3	2015–	2019 MotoGP Italian Grand Prix	2022 MotoGP Japanese Grand Prix
50	ITA	**Fabio Di Giannantonio**	3	2022–	2024 MotoGP Thailand Grand Prix	2026 MotoGP Czech Republic Grand Prix
64	ITA	Nello Pagani†	2	1949–1955	1949 500cc Dutch TT	1949 500cc Nations Grand Prix
64	ITA	Carlo Bandirola	2	1950–1956; 1958	1950 500cc Swiss Grand Prix	1950 500cc Nations Grand Prix
64	UK	Fergus Anderson†	2	1951; 1953–1954	1951 500cc Swiss Grand Prix	1953 500cc Spanish Grand Prix
64	UK	Bill Lomas†	2	1952; 1954–1956	1955 500cc Ulster Grand Prix	1956 500cc Ulster Grand Prix
64	ITA	Remo Venturi	2	1958–1960; 1962; 1964	1960 500cc Dutch TT	1962 500cc Nations Grand Prix
64	ARG	Benedicto Caldarella	2	1962–1964	1962 500cc Argentine Grand Prix	1964 500cc Nations Grand Prix
64	ITA	Gianfranco Bonera	2	1973–1975; 1977–1978; 1980	1974 500cc Austrian Grand Prix	1974 500cc Czechoslovak Grand Prix
64	UK	Mick Grant	2	1970; 1972–1976; 1979; 1984	1973 500cc Isle of Man TT	1975 500cc Isle of Man TT
64	UK	John Williams	2	1968–1978	1976 500cc Isle of Man TT	1976 500cc Belgian Grand Prix
64	NED	Wil Hartog	2	1972–1973; 1975–1981	1979 500cc Swedish Grand Prix	1980 500cc Finnish Grand Prix
64	JPN	Takazumi Katayama†	2	1976–1985	1982 500cc San Marino Grand Prix	1983 500cc German Grand Prix
64	BEL	Didier de Radiguès	2	1983–1988; 1991	1983 500cc Austrian Grand Prix	1984 500cc Austrian Grand Prix
64	NZL	Simon Crafar	2	1993; 1998–1999	1998 500cc British Grand Prix	1998 500cc Australian Grand Prix
64	JPN	Makoto Tamada	2	2003–2007	2004 MotoGP Rio de Janeiro Grand Prix	2004 MotoGP Japanese Grand Prix
64	USA	John Hopkins	2	2002–2008; 2011	2007 MotoGP French Grand Prix	2007 MotoGP Catalan Grand Prix
64	GER	**Jonas Folger**	2	2017; 2023; 2026	2017 MotoGP Catalan Grand Prix	2017 MotoGP German Grand Prix
64	ITA	Danilo Petrucci	2	2012–2023	2016 MotoGP Dutch TT	2018 MotoGP Italian Grand Prix
64	PRT	Miguel Oliveira	2	2019–2025	2020 MotoGP Portuguese Grand Prix	2021 MotoGP German Grand Prix
64	ITA	**Franco Morbidelli**†	2	2018–	2020 MotoGP Teruel Grand Prix	2025 MotoGP Italian Grand Prix
64	JPN	**Ai Ogura**	2	2025–	2026 MotoGP United States Grand Prix	2026 MotoGP Dutch TT
64	ESP	**Raúl Fernández**	2	2022–	2025 MotoGP Valencian Grand Prix	2026 MotoGP British Grand Prix
64	ESP	**Fermín Aldeguer**	2	2025–	2025 MotoGP Indonesian Grand Prix	2026 MotoGP San Marino Grand Prix
86	ITA	Arciso Artesiani	1	1949–1951	1949 500cc Belgian Grand Prix	1949 500cc Belgian Grand Prix
86	ITA	Enrico Lorenzetti†	1	1949; 1951	1951 500cc Spanish Grand Prix	1951 500cc Spanish Grand Prix
86	ITA	Umberto Masetti*	1	1950–1952; 1954–1958	1951 500cc Dutch TT	1951 500cc Dutch TT
86	UK	Jack Brett	1	1949–1957; 1959–1960	1952 500cc Swiss Grand Prix	1952 500cc Swiss Grand Prix
86	IRL	Reg Armstrong	1	1949–1956	1953 500cc French Grand Prix	1953 500cc French Grand Prix
86	NZL	Rod Coleman	1	1951–1954	1953 500cc Swiss Grand Prix	1953 500cc Swiss Grand Prix
86	UK	Dickie Dale	1	1950; 1953–1960	1953 500cc Nations Grand Prix	1953 500cc Nations Grand Prix
86	FRA	Pierre Monneret	1	1953–1956	1954 500cc French Grand Prix	1954 500cc French Grand Prix
86	AUS	Keith Campbell	1	1954; 1957–1958	1957 500cc Belgian Grand Prix	1957 500cc Belgian Grand Prix
86	ITA	Libero Liberati*	1	1952–1953; 1955–1957	1957 500cc Nations Grand Prix	1957 500cc Nations Grand Prix
86	ARG	Eduardo Salatino	1	1961–1962	1961 500cc Argentine Grand Prix	1961 500cc Argentine Grand Prix
86	UK	John Hartle	1	1955–1956; 1958–1960; 1963–1964; 1967–1968	1963 500cc Dutch TT	1963 500cc Dutch TT
86	CAN	Mike Duff	1	1961–1967	1964 500cc Finnish Grand Prix	1964 500cc Finnish Grand Prix
86	ZAF	Paddy Driver	1	1958–1965	1965 500cc Ulster Grand Prix	1965 500cc Ulster Grand Prix
86	RAN	Jim Redman†	1	1959–1960; 1966	1966 500cc West German Grand Prix	1966 500cc West German Grand Prix
86	UK	John Findlay	1	1969	1969 500cc Ulster Grand Prix	1969 500cc Ulster Grand Prix
86	AUS	John Dodds	1	1966–1971	1969 500cc Nations Grand Prix	1969 500cc Nations Grand Prix
86	UK	Godfrey Nash	1	1968–1971	1969 500cc Yugoslavian Grand Prix	1969 500cc Yugoslavian Grand Prix
86	ITA	Angelo Bergamonti	1	1967–1970	1970 500cc Spanish Grand Prix	1970 500cc Spanish Grand Prix
86	SWE	Ivan Carlsson	1	1971–1973	1971 500cc Spanish Grand Prix	1971 500cc Spanish Grand Prix
86	UK	Chas Mortimer	1	1972–1976	1972 500cc Spanish Grand Prix	1972 500cc Spanish Grand Prix
86	NZL	Kim Newcombe	1	1972–1973	1973 500cc Yugoslavian Grand Prix	1973 500cc Yugoslavian Grand Prix
86	GER	Edmund Czihak	1	1974	1974 500cc German Grand Prix	1974 500cc German Grand Prix
86	UK	Charlie Williams	1	1972–1976	1974 500cc Isle of Man TT	1974 500cc Isle of Man TT
86	JPN	Hideo Kanaya	1	1972–1973; 1975	1975 500cc French Grand Prix	1975 500cc French Grand Prix
86	UK	John Newbold	1	1975–1980	1976 500cc Finnish Grand Prix	1976 500cc Finnish Grand Prix
86	NED	Marcel Ankoné	1	1973; 1975–1976	1976 500cc German Grand Prix	1976 500cc German Grand Prix
86	AUS	Jack Findlay	1	1958–1978	1977 500cc Austrian Grand Prix	1977 500cc Austrian Grand Prix
86	UK	Steve Parrish	1	1977–1985	1977 500cc British Grand Prix	1977 500cc British Grand Prix
86	FRA	Michel Rougerie	1	1973–1980	1978 500cc Belgian Grand Prix	1978 500cc Belgian Grand Prix
86	AUS	Kenny Blake	1	1978–1979	1979 500cc Belgian Grand Prix	1979 500cc Belgian Grand Prix
86	NED	Jack Middelburg	1	1977–1983	1979 500cc Finnish Grand Prix	1979 500cc Finnish Grand Prix
86	ZAF	Kork Ballington†	1	1980–1982	1981 500cc Dutch TT	1981 500cc Dutch TT
86	SUI	Michel Frutschi	1	1975–1983	1982 500cc French Grand Prix	1982 500cc French Grand Prix
86	ITA	Franco Uncini*	1	1979–1985	1982 500cc Yugoslavian Grand Prix	1982 500cc Yugoslavian Grand Prix
86	NZL	Graeme Crosby	1	1980–1982	1982 500cc British Grand Prix	1982 500cc British Grand Prix
86	USA	Mike Baldwin	1	1979; 1981; 1985–1988	1986 500cc Nations Grand Prix	1986 500cc Nations Grand Prix
86	JPN	Tadahiko Taira	1	1984–1985; 1987–1991	1987 500cc British Grand Prix	1987 500cc British Grand Prix
86	AUS	Kevin Magee	1	1987–1991; 1993	1988 500cc Spanish Grand Prix	1988 500cc Spanish Grand Prix
86	ITA	Pierfrancesco Chili	1	1986–1990; 1995	1989 500cc Australian Grand Prix	1989 500cc Australian Grand Prix
86	ESP	Joan Garriga	1	1986; 1990–1993	1992 500cc Dutch TT	1992 500cc Dutch TT
86	JPN	Shinichi Ito	1	1988–1996; 1999; 2002; 2005; 2007; 2011	1994 500cc Czech Republic Grand Prix	1994 500cc Czech Republic Grand Prix
86	ESP	Alberto Puig	1	1994–1997	1995 500cc Spanish Grand Prix	1995 500cc Spanish Grand Prix
86	AUS	Daryl Beattie	1	1992–1997	1995 500cc Argentine Grand Prix	1995 500cc Argentine Grand Prix
86	JPN	Norifumi Abe	1	1994–2004	1996 500cc Japanese Grand Prix	1996 500cc Japanese Grand Prix
86	USA	Scott Russell	1	1995–1996	1996 500cc British Grand Prix	1996 500cc British Grand Prix
86	AUS	Garry McCoy	1	1998–2004; 2006	2000 500cc British Grand Prix	2000 500cc British Grand Prix
86	JPN	Shinya Nakano	1	2001–2008	2001 500cc German Grand Prix	2001 500cc German Grand Prix
86	JPN	Daijiro Kato†	1	2002–2003	2002 MotoGP Czech Republic Grand Prix	2002 MotoGP Czech Republic Grand Prix
86	JPN	Noriyuki Haga	1	1998; 2001; 2003	2003 MotoGP French Grand Prix	2003 MotoGP French Grand Prix
86	AUS	Chris Vermeulen	1	2005–2009; 2012	2007 MotoGP Turkish Grand Prix	2007 MotoGP Turkish Grand Prix
86	USA	Ben Spies	1	2008–2013	2011 MotoGP Dutch TT	2011 MotoGP Dutch TT
86	ESP	Álvaro Bautista†	1	2010–2018; 2023	2014 MotoGP Qatar Grand Prix	2014 MotoGP Qatar Grand Prix
86	UK	Scott Redding	1	2014–2018	2017 MotoGP Dutch TT	2017 MotoGP Dutch TT
86	ESP	**Pol Espargaró**†	1	2014–2026	2020 MotoGP Styrian Grand Prix	2020 MotoGP Styrian Grand Prix
86	ESP	**Joan Mir***	1	2019–	2021 MotoGP Styrian Grand Prix	2021 MotoGP Styrian Grand Prix
86	ITA	**Luca Marini**	1	2021–	2022 MotoGP Aragon Grand Prix	2022 MotoGP Aragon Grand Prix

== By nationality ==
As of the 2026 MotoGP Portuguese Grand Prix

Rank	Country	Fastest laps	Rider(s)
1	Italy	273	29
2	Spain	232	20
3	United States	151	14
4	United Kingdom	130	22
5	Australia	108	13
6	France	32	5
7	Japan	23	12
8	Rhodesia	14	3
8	Brazil	14	1
10	Finland	8	2
11	South Africa	6	3
12	New Zealand	5	4
13	Venezuela	4	1
13	Netherlands	4	3
15	Argentina	3	2
15	Germany	3	2
17	Belgium	2	1
17	Portugal	2	1
19	Ireland	1	1
19	Canada	1	1
19	Sweden	1	1
19	Switzerland	1	1
