= Ivan Carlsson =

Swedish motorcycle racer

Kurt-Ivan Carlsson
- Nationality: (Sweden) Swedish
Motorcycle racing career statistics
Grand Prix motorcycle racing
Active years	1971 - 1973, 1975 - 1977, 1979
First race	1971 350cc Austrian Grand Prix
Last race	1977
Championships	0
Starts / Wins / Podiums / Poles / F. laps / Points; 19 / 0 / 1 / 0 / 0 / 113

Kurt-Ivan Carlsson was a former Grand Prix motorcycle road racer from Sweden. His best year was in 1971, when he finished third in the 350cc world championship.
