= Theo Bult =

Dutch motorcycle racer

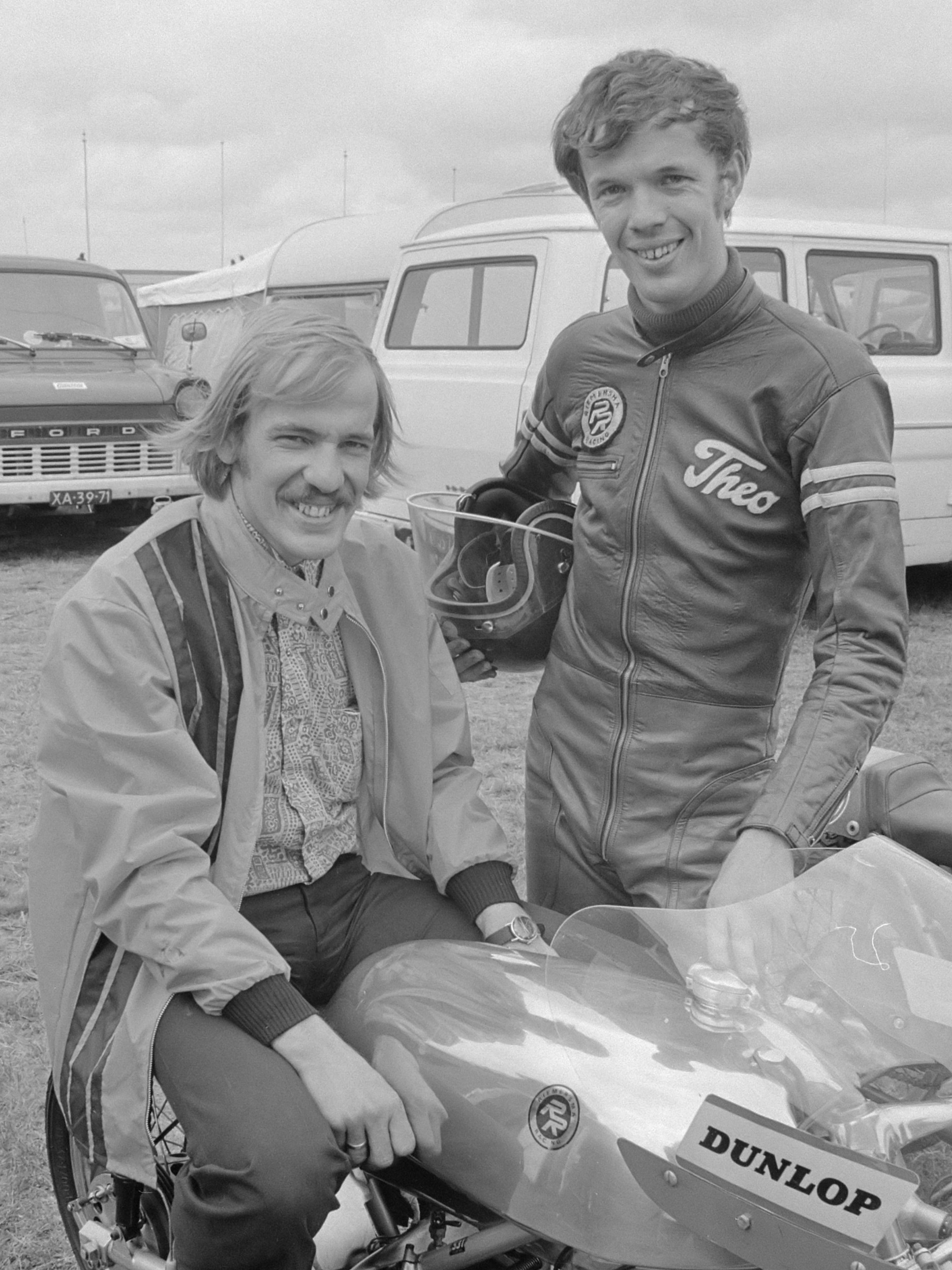
- Rob Bron and Theo Bult (r.) (1971)
- Nationality: Dutch
- Born: Lonneker, Netherlands
Motorcycle racing career statistics
Grand Prix motorcycle racing
| Active years | 1970–1971 |
| First race | 1970 250cc Dutch TT |
| Last race | 1971 350cc Czechoslovak Grand Prix |
Starts / Wins / Podiums / Poles / F. laps / Points; 12 / 0 / 3 / 0 / 0 / 76

Theo Bult is a Dutch former Grand Prix motorcycle road racer. He had his best year in 1971 when he finished the season in fourth place in the 350cc world championship.

== Motorcycle Grand Prix results ==
Points system from 1950 to 1968:

| **Position** | 1 | 2 | 3 | 4 | 5 | 6 |
| **Points** | 8 | 6 | 4 | 3 | 2 | 1 |

Points system from 1969 onwards:

| **Position** | 1 | 2 | 3 | 4 | 5 | 6 | 7 | 8 | 9 | 10 |
| **Points** | 15 | 12 | 10 | 8 | 6 | 5 | 4 | 3 | 2 | 1 |

(key) (Races in bold indicate pole position; races in italics indicate fastest lap)

| Year | Class | Team | 1 | 2 | 3 | 4 | 5 | 6 | 7 | 8 | 9 | 10 | 11 | 12 | Points | Rank |
|---|---|---|---|---|---|---|---|---|---|---|---|---|---|---|---|---|
| 1970 | 250cc | Yamaha | GER | FRA | YUG | IOM | NED; 8 | BEL | DDR; 7 | CZE; 4 | FIN | ULS | NAT | ESP | 15 | 16th |
| 1970 | 350cc | Yamaha | GER | | YUG | IOM | NED | DDR | CZE; 8 | FIN | ULS | NAT | ESP | | 3 | 32nd |
| 1971 | 250cc | Yamaha | AUT | GER; 8 | IOM | NED; 2 | BEL; 8 | DDR | CZE | SWE | FIN | ULS | NAT; 7 | ESP | 22 | 10th |
| 1971 | 350cc | Yamaha | AUT | GER; 4 | IOM | NED; 3 | | DDR; 4 | CZE; 3 | SWE | FIN | ULS | NAT | ESP | 36 | 4th |
