= 2018 MotoGP World Championship =

70th running of the MotoGP World Championship

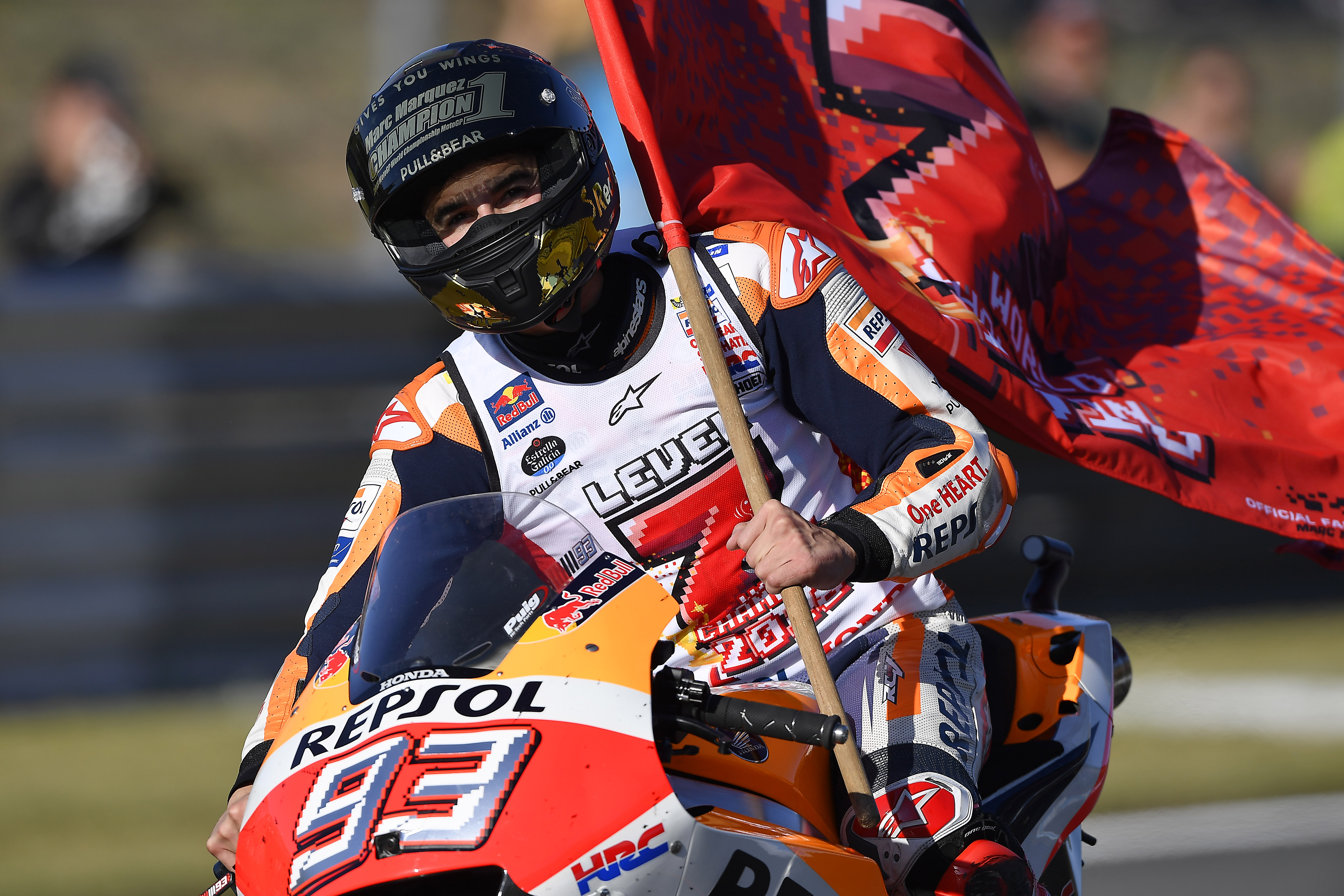
Marc Márquez was the 2018 MotoGP World Riders' Champion.

The 2018 FIM MotoGP World Championship was the premier class of the 70th Fédération Internationale de Motocyclisme (FIM) Road Racing World Championship season, the highest level of competition in motorcycle road racing. Marc Márquez entered the season as the reigning champion, with Repsol Honda Team being the reigning team champions and Honda the reigning constructors' champions.

Originally scheduled for 19 races, the season was reduced by one Grand Prix due to the cancellation of the 26 August Silverstone event due to unsafe track conditions involving standing water after a rider vote.

Marc Márquez clinched the championship trophy on 21 October 2018 after sixteen rounds, winning three consecutive races during spring, another three consecutive races during autumn and nine overall. Andrea Dovizioso finished in second and Valentino Rossi ended up in third, the former with four wins, while Rossi did not record a race win. Jorge Lorenzo with three wins and a win apiece for Cal Crutchlow and Maverick Viñales were the other race winners. Yamaha suffered their worst winless streak in their history with no wins for 25 races, which lasted from the 2017 German Grand Prix until Viñales won the Australian Grand Prix. KTM got their first podium finish at the Valencian Grand Prix with Pol Espargaró, finishing in third.

== Teams and riders ==
Team	Constructor	Motorcycle	No.	Rider	Rounds
(Italy) Aprilia Racing Team Gresini	Aprilia	RS-GP	41	(Spain) Aleix Espargaró	All
(Italy) Aprilia Racing Team Gresini	Aprilia	RS-GP	45	(United Kingdom) Scott Redding	All
(Italy) Ducati Team	Ducati	Desmosedici GP18	04	(Italy) Andrea Dovizioso	All
(Italy) Ducati Team	Ducati	Desmosedici GP18	99	(Spain) Jorge Lorenzo	1–16, 18–19 (Note: Jorge Lorenzo competed in the two Friday practice sessions during round 18, before being replaced by Michele Pirro.)
(Italy) Ducati Team	Ducati	Desmosedici GP18	19	(Spain) Álvaro Bautista	17
(Italy) Ducati Team	Ducati	Desmosedici GP18	51	(Italy) Michele Pirro	18
(Italy) Ducati Team	Ducati	Desmosedici GP18	51	(Italy) Michele Pirro	6, 13, 19
(Italy) Alma Pramac Racing	Ducati	Desmosedici GP18	9	(Italy) Danilo Petrucci	All
(Italy) Alma Pramac Racing	Ducati	Desmosedici GP17	43	(Australia) Jack Miller	All
(Spain) Ángel Nieto Team	Ducati	Desmosedici GP17	19	(Spain) Álvaro Bautista	1–16, 18–19
(Spain) Ángel Nieto Team	Ducati	Desmosedici GP17	17	(Czech Republic) Karel Abraham	17
(Spain) Ángel Nieto Team	Ducati	Desmosedici GP16	17	(Czech Republic) Karel Abraham	1–16, 18–19
(Spain) Ángel Nieto Team	Ducati	Desmosedici GP16	7	(Australia) Mike Jones	17
(Spain) Reale Avintia Racing	Ducati	Desmosedici GP17	53	(Spain) Tito Rabat	1–12
(Spain) Reale Avintia Racing	Ducati	Desmosedici GP17	10	(Belgium) Xavier Siméon	13–19
(Spain) Reale Avintia Racing	Ducati	Desmosedici GP16	10	(Belgium) Xavier Siméon	1–12
(Spain) Reale Avintia Racing	Ducati	Desmosedici GP16	23	(France) Christophe Ponsson	13
(Spain) Reale Avintia Racing	Ducati	Desmosedici GP16	81	(Spain) Jordi Torres	14–19
(Belgium) EG 0,0 Marc VDS	Honda	RC213V	12	(Switzerland) Thomas Lüthi	All
(Belgium) EG 0,0 Marc VDS	Honda	RC213V	21	(Italy) Franco Morbidelli	All (Note: Franco Morbidelli competed in the first Friday practice session during round 9, before being replaced by Stefan Bradl.)
(Belgium) EG 0,0 Marc VDS	Honda	RC213V	6	(Germany) Stefan Bradl	9
(Monaco) LCR Honda Idemitsu (Monaco) LCR Honda Castrol	Honda	RC213V	30	(Japan) Takaaki Nakagami	All
(Monaco) LCR Honda Idemitsu (Monaco) LCR Honda Castrol	Honda	RC213V	35	(United Kingdom) Cal Crutchlow	1–17
(Monaco) LCR Honda Idemitsu (Monaco) LCR Honda Castrol	Honda	RC213V	6	(Germany) Stefan Bradl	18–19
(Japan) Repsol Honda Team	Honda	RC213V	26	(Spain) Dani Pedrosa	All
(Japan) Repsol Honda Team	Honda	RC213V	93	(Spain) Marc Márquez	All
(Japan) HRC Honda Team	Honda	RC213V	6	(Germany) Stefan Bradl	10, 13
(Austria) Red Bull KTM Factory Racing	KTM	RC16	38	(United Kingdom) Bradley Smith	All
(Austria) Red Bull KTM Factory Racing	KTM	RC16	44	(Spain) Pol Espargaró	1–10, 13–19
(Austria) Red Bull KTM Factory Racing	KTM	RC16	76	(France) Loris Baz	12
(Austria) Red Bull KTM Factory Racing	KTM	RC16	36	(Finland) Mika Kallio	4, 7, 9
(Japan) Team Suzuki Ecstar	Suzuki	GSX-RR	29	(Italy) Andrea Iannone	All
(Japan) Team Suzuki Ecstar	Suzuki	GSX-RR	42	(Spain) Álex Rins	All
(Japan) Team Suzuki Ecstar	Suzuki	GSX-RR	50	(France) Sylvain Guintoli	7, 10, 16
(France) Monster Yamaha Tech 3	Yamaha	YZR-M1	5	(France) Johann Zarco	All
(France) Monster Yamaha Tech 3	Yamaha	YZR-M1	55	(Malaysia) Hafizh Syahrin	All
(Japan) Movistar Yamaha MotoGP	Yamaha	YZR-M1	25	(Spain) Maverick Viñales	All
(Japan) Movistar Yamaha MotoGP	Yamaha	YZR-M1	46	(Italy) Valentino Rossi	All
(Japan) Yamalube Yamaha Factory Racing	Yamaha	YZR-M1	89	(Japan) Katsuyuki Nakasuga	16

Key
Regular rider
Replacement rider
Wildcard rider

All teams used series-specified Michelin tyres.

=== Team changes ===
- LCR Honda expanded to enter a second bike for the first time since 2015.
- Aspar Team raced under the name of "Ángel Nieto Team" from 2018 in honor of the late Ángel Nieto.

=== Rider changes ===
- Sam Lowes was released from his contract with Aprilia Racing Team Gresini one year before it expired. Lowes returned to the Moto2 category.
- Thomas Lüthi moved up to MotoGP, making his début with EG 0,0 Marc VDS after competing in the intermediate class for eleven seasons.
- 2017 Moto2 champion Franco Morbidelli was promoted to MotoGP, making his début with EG 0,0 Marc VDS.
- Tito Rabat returned to Reale Avintia Racing, after leaving EG 0,0 Marc VDS. He was partnered by Xavier Siméon who moved up to the premier class. Rabat previously competed with Avintia Racing under the name By Queroseno Racing (BQR) between the 2005 125cc and the 2011 Moto2 seasons.
- Takaaki Nakagami moved up to MotoGP with LCR Honda.
- Scott Redding left Pramac Racing at the end of the 2017 season to join Aprilia Racing Team Gresini. His place was taken by Jack Miller.
- Loris Baz left MotoGP and returned to Superbike World Championship. During mid-season, Baz replaced injured Pol Espargaró at Red Bull KTM Factory Racing for British GP.
- Héctor Barberá returned to the intermediate class, Moto2, after leaving Reale Avintia Racing. Barberá has completed eight seasons in the premier class.
- Jonas Folger, who was on the provisional entry list, withdrew from the 2018 season to focus on recovery from illness. Hafizh Syahrin moved up to MotoGP to fill his spot in Monster Yamaha Tech 3. He became the first Malaysian rider to compete in the sport's premier class.

==== Mid-season changes ====
- Randy de Puniet returned to MotoGP as the KTM test rider, replacing Mika Kallio who suffered a knee injury during German Grand Prix for the remainder of the season.
- Tito Rabat got injured after the British Grand Prix, so he was replaced by Christophe Ponsson for the San Marino Grand Prix. Jordi Torres also replacing him since Aragon Grand Prix onwards.
- Álvaro Bautista replaced Jorge Lorenzo at the Australian Grand Prix due to injuries sustained at the Thailand Grand Prix, with Mike Jones to take Bautista's place.

== Calendar ==
The following Grands Prix took place in 2018:

Round	Date	Grand Prix	Circuit
1	18 March (Note: Night race)	Grand Prix of Qatar	Lusail International Circuit, Lusail
2	8 April	Gran Premio Motul de la República Argentina	Autódromo Termas de Río Hondo, Termas de Río Hondo
3	22 April	(United States) Red Bull Grand Prix of the Americas	Circuit of the Americas, Austin
4	6 May	(Spain) Gran Premio Red Bull de España	Circuito de Jerez, Jerez de la Frontera
5	20 May	HJC Helmets Grand Prix de France	Bugatti Circuit, Le Mans
6	3 June	(Italy) Gran Premio d'Italia Oakley	Mugello Circuit, Scarperia e San Piero
7	17 June	(Catalonia) Gran Premi Monster Energy de Catalunya	Circuit de Barcelona-Catalunya, Montmeló
8	1 July	(Netherlands) Motul TT Assen	TT Circuit Assen, Assen
9	15 July	(Germany) Pramac Motorrad Grand Prix Deutschland	Sachsenring, Hohenstein-Ernstthal
10	5 August	(Czech Republic) Monster Energy Grand Prix České republiky	Brno Circuit, Brno
11	12 August	(Austria) Eyetime Motorrad Grand Prix von Österreich	Red Bull Ring, Spielberg
12	26 August	(United Kingdom) GoPro British Grand Prix	Silverstone Circuit, Silverstone
13	9 September	Gran Premio Octo di San Marino e della Riviera di Rimini	Misano World Circuit, Misano Adriatico
14	23 September	(Aragon) Gran Premio Movistar de Aragón	MotorLand Aragón, Alcañiz
15	7 October	PTT Thailand Grand Prix	Buriram International Circuit, Buriram
16	21 October	Motul Grand Prix of Japan	Motegi Circuit, Motegi
17	28 October	(Australia) Michelin Australian Motorcycle Grand Prix	Phillip Island Grand Prix Circuit, Phillip Island
18	4 November	Shell Malaysia Motorcycle Grand Prix	Sepang International Circuit, Sepang
19	18 November	(Valencian Community) Gran Premio Motul de la Comunitat Valenciana	Circuit Ricardo Tormo, Valencia

=== Calendar changes ===
Comparison between the configuration of the Circuit de Barcelona-Catalunya used in 2016 and 2017 (top), and the layout used starting 2018 (bottom).
- The British Grand Prix was scheduled to move from Silverstone to the new Circuit of Wales, but construction on the new track has not commenced. The two circuits reached a deal that will see Silverstone with an option to host the 2018 race. In the end, the British Grand Prix saw all three races being cancelled due to dangerous track conditions on race day, and was not re-arranged.
- The Thailand Grand Prix is a new addition to the calendar, with the race scheduled for 7 October.
- The Catalan Grand Prix used a new configuration of the Circuit de Barcelona-Catalunya, wherein the previous set of corners of turns 13, 14 and 15 were combined into a sweeping right corner. The new layout was previously used in Formula 1 from 2004 to 2006.

== Results and standings ==
=== Grands Prix ===
Round	Grand Prix	Pole position	Fastest lap	Winning rider	Winning team	Winning constructor	Report
1	Qatar motorcycle Grand Prix	(France) Johann Zarco	(Italy) Andrea Dovizioso	(Italy) Andrea Dovizioso	(Italy) Ducati Team	(Italy) Ducati	Report
2	(Argentina) Argentine Republic motorcycle Grand Prix	(Australia) Jack Miller	(Spain) Marc Márquez	(United Kingdom) Cal Crutchlow	(Monaco) LCR Honda Castrol	(Japan) Honda	Report
3	(United States) Motorcycle Grand Prix of the Americas	(Spain) Marc Márquez (Note: Márquez was given a 3-place grid penalty for a riding infringement during qualifying but retains the pole position credit despite starting the race from 4th position. Maverick Viñales started the race from the first grid slot.)	(Spain) Marc Márquez	(Spain) Marc Márquez	(Japan) Repsol Honda Team	(Japan) Honda	Report
4	(Spain) Spanish motorcycle Grand Prix	(United Kingdom) Cal Crutchlow	(Spain) Marc Márquez	(Spain) Marc Márquez	(Japan) Repsol Honda Team	(Japan) Honda	Report
5	(France) French motorcycle Grand Prix	(France) Johann Zarco	(Spain) Marc Márquez	(Spain) Marc Márquez	(Japan) Repsol Honda Team	(Japan) Honda	Report
6	(Italy) Italian motorcycle Grand Prix	(Italy) Valentino Rossi	(Italy) Danilo Petrucci	(Spain) Jorge Lorenzo	(Italy) Ducati Team	(Italy) Ducati	Report
7	(Catalonia) Catalan motorcycle Grand Prix	(Spain) Jorge Lorenzo	(Spain) Jorge Lorenzo	(Spain) Jorge Lorenzo	(Italy) Ducati Team	(Italy) Ducati	Report
8	(Netherlands) Dutch TT	(Spain) Marc Márquez	(Spain) Maverick Viñales	(Spain) Marc Márquez	(Japan) Repsol Honda Team	(Japan) Honda	Report
9	(Germany) German motorcycle Grand Prix	(Spain) Marc Márquez	(Spain) Marc Márquez	(Spain) Marc Márquez	(Japan) Repsol Honda Team	(Japan) Honda	Report
10	Czech Republic motorcycle Grand Prix	(Italy) Andrea Dovizioso	(Spain) Jorge Lorenzo	(Italy) Andrea Dovizioso	(Italy) Ducati Team	(Italy) Ducati	Report
11	(Austria) Austrian motorcycle Grand Prix	(Spain) Marc Márquez	(Italy) Andrea Dovizioso	(Spain) Jorge Lorenzo	(Italy) Ducati Team	(Italy) Ducati	Report
12	(United Kingdom) British motorcycle Grand Prix	(Spain) Jorge Lorenzo	Race cancelled (Note: All racing at Silverstone was cancelled due to sustained heavy rain and unsafe track conditions.)				Report
13	San Marino and Rimini Riviera motorcycle Grand Prix	(Spain) Jorge Lorenzo	(Italy) Andrea Dovizioso	(Italy) Andrea Dovizioso	(Italy) Ducati Team	(Italy) Ducati	Report
14	Aragon motorcycle Grand Prix	(Spain) Jorge Lorenzo	(Italy) Andrea Dovizioso	(Spain) Marc Márquez	(Japan) Repsol Honda Team	(Japan) Honda	Report
15	Thailand motorcycle Grand Prix	(Spain) Marc Márquez	(Spain) Marc Márquez	(Spain) Marc Márquez	(Japan) Repsol Honda Team	(Japan) Honda	Report
16	(Japan) Japanese motorcycle Grand Prix	(Italy) Andrea Dovizioso	(Spain) Marc Márquez	(Spain) Marc Márquez	(Japan) Repsol Honda Team	(Japan) Honda	Report
17	(Australia) Australian motorcycle Grand Prix	(Spain) Marc Márquez	(Spain) Maverick Viñales	(Spain) Maverick Viñales	(Japan) Movistar Yamaha MotoGP	(Japan) Yamaha	Report
18	(Malaysia) Malaysian motorcycle Grand Prix	(Spain) Marc Márquez (Note: Márquez was given a 6-place grid penalty for a riding infringement during qualifying but retains the pole position credit despite starting the race from 7th position. Johann Zarco started the race from the first grid slot.)	(Spain) Álex Rins	(Spain) Marc Márquez	(Japan) Repsol Honda Team	(Japan) Honda	Report
19	Valencian Community motorcycle Grand Prix	(Spain) Maverick Viñales	(Italy) Andrea Dovizioso	(Italy) Andrea Dovizioso	(Italy) Ducati Team	(Italy) Ducati	Report

=== Riders' standings ===
Scoring system

Points were awarded to the top fifteen finishers. A rider had to finish the race to earn points.

Position	1st	2nd	3rd	4th	5th	6th	7th	8th	9th	10th	11th	12th	13th	14th	15th
Points	25	20	16	13	11	10	9	8	7	6	5	4	3	2	1

Pos.	Rider	Bike	Team	QAT (Qatar)	ARG (Argentina)	AME (United States)	SPA (Spain)	FRA (France)	ITA (Italy)	CAT (Catalonia)	NED (Netherlands)	GER (Germany)	CZE (Czech Republic)	AUT (Austria)	GBR (United Kingdom)	RSM (San Marino)	ARA (Aragon)	THA (Thailand)	JPN (Japan)	AUS (Australia)	MAL (Malaysia)	VAL (Valencian Community)	Pts
1	(Spain) Marc Márquez	Honda	Repsol Honda Team	2	18^{F}	1^{P F}	1^{F}	1^{F}	16	2	1^{P}	1^{P F}	3	2^{P}	C	2	1	1^{P F}	1^{F}	Ret^{P}	1^{P}	Ret	321
2	(Italy) Andrea Dovizioso	Ducati	Ducati Team	1^{F}	6	5	Ret	Ret	2	Ret	4	7	1^{P}	3^{F}	C	1^{F}	2^{F}	2	18^{P}	3	6	1^{F}	245
3	(Italy) Valentino Rossi	Yamaha	Movistar Yamaha MotoGP	3	19	4	5	3	3^{P}	3	5	2	4	6	C	7	8	4	4	6	18	13	198
4	(Spain) Maverick Viñales	Yamaha	Movistar Yamaha MotoGP	6	5	2	7	7	8	6	3^{F}	3	Ret	12	C	5	10	3	7	1^{F}	4	Ret^{P}	193
5	(Spain) Álex Rins	Suzuki	Team Suzuki Ecstar	Ret	3	Ret	Ret	10	5	Ret	2	Ret	11	8	C	4	4	6	3	5	2^{F}	2	169
6	(France) Johann Zarco	Yamaha	Monster Yamaha Tech 3	8^{P}	2	6	2	Ret^{P}	10	7	8	9	7	9	C	10	14	5	6	Ret	3	7	158
7	(United Kingdom) Cal Crutchlow	Honda	LCR Honda Castrol	4	1	19	Ret^{P}	8	6	4	6	Ret	5	4	C	3	Ret	7	2	DNS			148
8	(Italy) Danilo Petrucci	Ducati	Alma Pramac Racing	5	10	12	4	2	7^{F}	8	Ret	4	6	5	C	11	7	9	9	12	9	Ret	144
9	(Spain) Jorge Lorenzo	Ducati	Ducati Team	Ret	15	11	Ret	6	1	1^{P F}	7	6	2^{F}	1	C^{P}	17^{P}	Ret^{P}	DNS	DNS		WD	12	134
10	(Italy) Andrea Iannone	Suzuki	Team Suzuki Ecstar	9	8	3	3	Ret	4	10	11	12	10	13	C	8	3	11	Ret	2	Ret	Ret	133
11	(Spain) Dani Pedrosa	Honda	Repsol Honda Team	7	Ret	7	Ret	5	Ret	5	15	8	8	7	C	6	5	Ret	8	Ret	5	5	117
12	(Spain) Álvaro Bautista	Ducati	Ángel Nieto Team	13	16	15	8	Ret	9	9	9	5	9	10	C	9	Ret	8	5		7	Ret	105
12	(Spain) Álvaro Bautista	Ducati	Ducati Team																	4			105
13	(Australia) Jack Miller	Ducati	Alma Pramac Racing	10	4^{P}	9	6	4	Ret	Ret	10	14	12	18	C	18	9	10	Ret	7	8	Ret	91
14	(Spain) Pol Espargaró	KTM	Red Bull KTM Factory Racing	Ret	11	13	11	11	11	11	12	Ret	DNS			Ret	DNS	21	13	Ret	Ret	3	51
15	(Italy) Franco Morbidelli	Honda	EG 0,0 Marc VDS	12	14	21	9	13	15	14	DNS	WD	13	19	C	12	11	14	11	8	12	Ret	50
16	(Malaysia) Hafizh Syahrin	Yamaha	Monster Yamaha Tech 3	14	9	Ret	16	12	12	Ret	18	11	14	16	C	19	18	12	10	Ret	10	10	46
17	(Spain) Aleix Espargaró	Aprilia	Aprilia Racing Team Gresini	19	Ret	10	Ret	9	Ret	Ret	13	DNS	15	17	C	14	6	13	Ret	9	11	Ret	44
18	(United Kingdom) Bradley Smith	KTM	Red Bull KTM Factory Racing	18	Ret	16	13	14	14	Ret	17	10	Ret	14	C	16	13	15	12	10	15	8	38
19	(Spain) Tito Rabat	Ducati	Reale Avintia Racing	11	7	8	14	Ret	13	Ret	16	13	Ret	11	C								35
20	(Japan) Takaaki Nakagami	Honda	LCR Honda Idemitsu	17	13	14	12	15	18	Ret	19	Ret	17	15	C	13	12	22	15	14	14	6	33
21	(United Kingdom) Scott Redding	Aprilia	Aprilia Racing Team Gresini	20	12	17	15	Ret	Ret	12	14	15	Ret	20	C	21	16	16	19	13	19	11	20
22	(Italy) Michele Pirro	Ducati	Ducati Team						DNS							15					Ret	4	14
23	(Czech Republic) Karel Abraham	Ducati	Ángel Nieto Team	15	20	Ret	18	17	Ret	13	Ret	18	18	21	C	20	15	17	Ret	11	Ret	14	12
24	(Germany) Stefan Bradl	Honda	EG 0,0 Marc VDS									16											10
24	(Germany) Stefan Bradl	Honda	HRC Honda Team										Ret			Ret							10
24	(Germany) Stefan Bradl	Honda	LCR Honda Castrol																		13	9	10
25	(Finland) Mika Kallio	KTM	Red Bull KTM Factory Racing				10			Ret		DNS											6
26	(Japan) Katsuyuki Nakasuga	Yamaha	Yamalube Yamaha Factory Racing																14				2
27	(Belgium) Xavier Siméon	Ducati	Reale Avintia Racing	21	21	20	17	18	17	Ret	Ret	19	20	Ret	C	Ret	19	18	16	15	17	DNS	1
28	(Spain) Jordi Torres	Ducati	Reale Avintia Racing														20	19	17	17	DNS	15	1
29	(Switzerland) Thomas Lüthi	Honda	EG 0,0 Marc VDS	16	17	18	Ret	16	Ret	Ret	20	17	16	22	C	22	17	20	20	16	16	Ret	0
30	(Australia) Mike Jones	Ducati	Ángel Nieto Team																	18			0
31	(France) Sylvain Guintoli	Suzuki	Team Suzuki Ecstar							Ret			19						21				0
32	(France) Christophe Ponsson	Ducati	Reale Avintia Racing													23							0
	(France) Loris Baz	KTM	Red Bull KTM Factory Racing												C								0
Pos.	Rider	Bike	Team	QAT (Qatar)	ARG (Argentina)	AME (United States)	SPA (Spain)	FRA (France)	ITA (Italy)	CAT (Catalonia)	NED (Netherlands)	GER (Germany)	CZE (Czech Republic)	AUT (Austria)	GBR (United Kingdom)	RSM (San Marino)	ARA (Aragon)	THA (Thailand)	JPN (Japan)	AUS (Australia)	MAL (Malaysia)	VAL (Valencian Community)	Pts

Race key
Colour	Result
Gold	Winner
Silver	2nd place
Bronze	3rd place
Green	Points finish
Blue	Non-points finish
Blue	Non-classified finish (NC)
Purple	Retired (Ret)
Red	Did not qualify (DNQ)
Black	Disqualified (DSQ)
White	Did not start (DNS)
White	Withdrew (WD)
White	Race cancelled (C)
Blank	Did not practice (DNP)
Blank	Excluded (EX)
Blank	Did not arrive (DNA)
Blank	Did not enter (empty cell)
Annotation	Meaning
P	Pole position
F	Fastest lap
Rider key
Colour	Meaning
Light blue	Rookie rider

=== Constructors' standings ===
Each constructor received the same number of points as their best placed rider in each race.

Pos.	Constructor	QAT (Qatar)	ARG (Argentina)	AME (United States)	SPA (Spain)	FRA (France)	ITA (Italy)	CAT (Catalonia)	NED (Netherlands)	GER (Germany)	CZE (Czech Republic)	AUT (Austria)	GBR (United Kingdom)	RSM (San Marino)	ARA (Aragon)	THA (Thailand)	JPN (Japan)	AUS (Australia)	MAL (Malaysia)	VAL (Valencian Community)	Pts
1	(Japan) Honda	2	1	1	1	1	6	2	1	1	3	2	C	2	1	1	1	8	1	5	375
2	(Italy) Ducati	1	4	5	4	2	1	1	4	4	1	1	C	1	2	2	5	3	6	1	335
3	(Japan) Yamaha	3	2	2	2	3	3	3	3	2	4	6	C	5	8	3	4	1	3	7	281
4	(Japan) Suzuki	9	3	3	3	10	4	10	2	12	10	8	C	4	3	6	3	2	2	2	233
5	(Austria) KTM	18	11	13	10	11	11	11	12	10	Ret	14	C	16	13	15	12	10	15	3	72
6	(Italy) Aprilia	19	12	10	15	9	Ret	12	13	15	15	17	C	14	6	13	19	9	11	11	59
Pos.	Constructor	QAT (Qatar)	ARG (Argentina)	AME (United States)	SPA (Spain)	FRA (France)	ITA (Italy)	CAT (Catalonia)	NED (Netherlands)	GER (Germany)	CZE (Czech Republic)	AUT (Austria)	GBR (United Kingdom)	RSM (San Marino)	ARA (Aragon)	THA (Thailand)	JPN (Japan)	AUS (Australia)	MAL (Malaysia)	VAL (Valencian Community)	Pts

=== Teams' standings ===
The teams' standings were based on results obtained by regular and substitute riders; wild-card entries were ineligible.

Pos.	Team	Bike No.	QAT (Qatar)	ARG (Argentina)	AME (United States)	SPA (Spain)	FRA (France)	ITA (Italy)	CAT (Catalonia)	NED (Netherlands)	GER (Germany)	CZE (Czech Republic)	AUT (Austria)	GBR (United Kingdom)	RSM (San Marino)	ARA (Aragon)	THA (Thailand)	JPN (Japan)	AUS (Australia)	MAL (Malaysia)	VAL (Valencian Community)	Pts
1	(Japan) Repsol Honda Team	26	7	Ret	7	Ret	5	Ret	5	15	8	8	7	C	6	5	Ret	8	Ret	5	5	451
1	(Japan) Repsol Honda Team	93	2	18^{F}	1^{P F}	1^{F}	1^{F}	16	2	1^{P}	1^{P F}	3	2^{P}	C	2	1	1^{P F}	1^{F}	Ret^{P}	1^{P}	Ret	451
2	(Italy) Ducati Team	04	1^{F}	6	5	Ret	Ret	2	Ret	4	7	1^{P}	3^{F}	C	1^{F}	2^{F}	2	18^{P}	3	6	1^{F}	392
2	(Italy) Ducati Team	19																	4			392
2	(Italy) Ducati Team	51																		Ret		392
2	(Italy) Ducati Team	99	Ret	15	11	Ret	6	1	1^{P F}	7	6	2^{F}	1	C^{P}	17^{P}	Ret^{P}	DNS	DNS		WD	12	392
3	(Japan) Movistar Yamaha MotoGP	25	6	5	2	7	7	8	6	3^{F}	3	Ret	12	C	5	10	3	7	1^{F}	4	Ret^{P}	391
3	(Japan) Movistar Yamaha MotoGP	46	3	19	4	5	3	3^{P}	3	5	2	4	6	C	7	8	4	4	6	18	13	391
4	(Japan) Team Suzuki Ecstar	29	9	8	3	3	Ret	4	10	11	12	10	13	C	8	3	11	Ret	2	Ret	Ret	302
4	(Japan) Team Suzuki Ecstar	42	Ret	3	Ret	Ret	10	5	Ret	2	Ret	11	8	C	4	4	6	3	5	2^{F}	2	302
5	(Italy) Alma Pramac Racing	9	5	10	12	4	2	7^{F}	8	Ret	4	6	5	C	11	7	9	9	12	9	Ret	235
5	(Italy) Alma Pramac Racing	43	10	4^{P}	9	6	4	Ret	Ret	10	14	12	18	C	18	9	10	Ret	7	8	Ret	235
6	(France) Monster Yamaha Tech 3	5	8^{P}	2	6	2	Ret^{P}	10	7	8	9	7	9	C	10	14	5	6	Ret	3	7	204
6	(France) Monster Yamaha Tech 3	55	14	9	Ret	16	12	12	Ret	18	11	14	16	C	19	18	12	10	Ret	10	10	204
7	(Monaco) LCR Honda	6																		13	9	191
7	(Monaco) LCR Honda	30	17	13	14	12	15	18	Ret	19	Ret	17	15	C	13	12	22	15	14	14	6	191
7	(Monaco) LCR Honda	35	4	1	19	Ret^{P}	8	6	4	6	Ret	5	4	C	3	Ret	7	2	DNS			191
8	(Spain) Ángel Nieto Team	7																	18			104
8	(Spain) Ángel Nieto Team	17	15	20	Ret	18	17	Ret	13	Ret	18	18	21	C	20	15	17	Ret	11	Ret	14	104
8	(Spain) Ángel Nieto Team	19	13	16	15	8	Ret	9	9	9	5	9	10	C	9	Ret	8	5		7	Ret	104
9	(Austria) Red Bull KTM Factory Racing	38	18	Ret	16	13	14	14	Ret	17	10	Ret	14	C	16	13	15	12	10	15	8	89
9	(Austria) Red Bull KTM Factory Racing	44	Ret	11	13	11	11	11	11	12	Ret	DNS			Ret	DNS	21	13	Ret	Ret	3	89
9	(Austria) Red Bull KTM Factory Racing	76												C								89
10	(Italy) Aprilia Racing Team Gresini	41	19	Ret	10	Ret	9	Ret	Ret	13	DNS	15	17	C	14	6	13	Ret	9	11	Ret	64
10	(Italy) Aprilia Racing Team Gresini	45	20	12	17	15	Ret	Ret	12	14	15	Ret	20	C	21	16	16	19	13	19	11	64
11	(Belgium) EG 0,0 Marc VDS	6									16											50
11	(Belgium) EG 0,0 Marc VDS	12	16	17	18	Ret	16	Ret	Ret	20	17	16	22	C	22	17	20	20	16	16	Ret	50
11	(Belgium) EG 0,0 Marc VDS	21	12	14	21	9	13	15	14	DNS	WD	13	19	C	12	11	14	11	8	12	Ret	50
12	(Spain) Reale Avintia Racing	10	21	21	20	17	18	17	Ret	Ret	19	20	Ret	C	Ret	19	18	16	15	17	DNS	37
12	(Spain) Reale Avintia Racing	23													23							37
12	(Spain) Reale Avintia Racing	53	11	7	8	14	Ret	13	Ret	16	13	Ret	11	C								37
12	(Spain) Reale Avintia Racing	81														20	19	17	17	DNS	15	37
Pos.	Team	Bike No.	QAT (Qatar)	ARG (Argentina)	AME (United States)	SPA (Spain)	FRA (France)	ITA (Italy)	CAT (Catalonia)	NED (Netherlands)	GER (Germany)	CZE (Czech Republic)	AUT (Austria)	GBR (United Kingdom)	RSM (San Marino)	ARA (Aragon)	THA (Thailand)	JPN (Japan)	AUS (Australia)	MAL (Malaysia)	VAL (Valencian Community)	Pts
