= 1976 Finnish motorcycle Grand Prix =

(Finland) 1976 Finnish Grand Prix
Race details
- Race 9 of 12 races in the 1976 Grand Prix motorcycle racing season
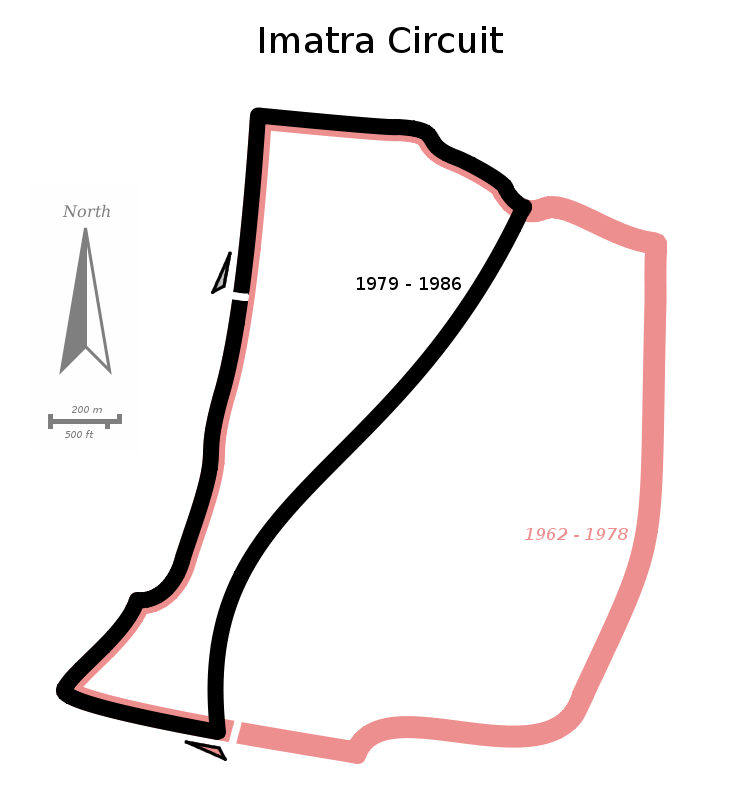
- Date: 1 August 1976
- Official name: Imatranajo
- Location: Imatra Circuit
- Course: Permanent racing facility; 6.030 km (3.747 mi)

500cc
Pole position
Rider	(Italy) Giacomo Agostini	Suzuki
Time	2:19.500	
Fastest lap
Rider	(United Kingdom) John Newbold	Suzuki
Time	2:15.200	
Podium
First	(United States) Pat Hennen	Suzuki
Second	(Finland) Teuvo Länsivuori	Suzuki
Third	(Switzerland) Philippe Coulon	Suzuki

350cc
Pole position
Rider	(Italy) Walter Villa	Harley-Davidson
Time	2:21.600	
Fastest lap
Rider	(Australia) John Dodds	Yamaha
Time	2:19.700	
Podium
First	(Italy) Walter Villa	Harley-Davidson
Second	(West Germany) Dieter Braun	Yamaha
Third	(United Kingdom) Tom Herron	Yamaha

250cc
Pole position
Rider	(Italy) Walter Villa	Harley-Davidson
Time	2:24.700	
Fastest lap
Rider	(Italy) Gianfranco Bonera	Harley-Davidson
Time	2:24.300	
Podium
First	(Italy) Walter Villa	Harley-Davidson
Second	(Japan) Takazumi Katayama	Yamaha
Third	(Italy) Gianfranco Bonera	Harley-Davidson

125cc
Pole position
Rider	(Italy) Pierpaolo Bianchi	Morbidelli
Time	2:32.800	
Fastest lap
Rider	(Italy) Pierpaolo Bianchi	Morbidelli
Time	2:32.200	
Podium
First	(Italy) Pierpaolo Bianchi	Morbidelli
Second	(West Germany) Gert Bender	Bender
Third	(Netherlands) Henk van Kessel	AGV Condor

50cc
Pole position
Rider	(Spain) Ángel Nieto	Bultaco
Time	2:52.700	
Fastest lap
Rider	(Belgium) Julien van Zeebroeck	Kreidler
Time	2:59.900	
Podium
First	(Belgium) Julien van Zeebroeck	Kreidler
Second	(Switzerland) Ulrich Graf	Kreidler
Third	(Italy) Eugenio Lazzarini	Morbidelli

The 1976 Finnish motorcycle Grand Prix was the ninth round of the 1976 Grand Prix motorcycle racing season. It took place on 1 August 1976 at the Imatra circuit. Pat Hennen won the race to become the first American to win a motorcycle Grand Prix.

== 500cc classification ==
Pos.	No.	Rider	Team	Manufacturer	Time/Retired	Points
1	28	(United States) Pat Hennen	Colemans	Suzuki	48'27.000	15
2	2	(Finland) Teuvo Länsivuori	Life Racing Team	Suzuki	+23.000	12
3	22	(Switzerland) Philippe Coulon		Suzuki	+33.400	10
4	6	(United Kingdom) John Newbold	Texaco Heron Team Suzuki	Suzuki	+33.800	8
5	30	(Italy) Marco Lucchinelli	Gallina Corse	Suzuki	+34.500	6
6	10	(West Germany) Dieter Braun		Suzuki	+50.800	5
7	5	(Australia) Jack Findlay	Jack Findlay Racing	Suzuki	+1'13.500	4
8	21	(France) Christian Estrosi		Suzuki	+1'58.600	3
9	18	(Finland) Pekka Nurmi		Yamaha	+1 lap	2
10	9	(Austria) Karl Auer	Racing Team NO	Yamaha	+1 lap	1
11	16	(France) Bernard Fau		Yamaha	+1 lap	
12	41	(Netherlands) Rob Bron		Yamaha	+1 lap	
13	31	(Denmark) Børge Nielsen		Yamaha	+1 lap	
14	36	(Finland) Kimmo Kopra		Yamaha	+2 laps	
15	44	(Sweden) Bo Granath		Yamaha	+11 laps	
Ret	11	(Italy) Giacomo Agostini	Team API Marlboro	Suzuki	Brakes	
Ret	11	(United Kingdom) Wilf Herron		Suzuki	Retired	
Ret	??	(Sweden) Johnny Bengtsson	Stigefetts Motor	Suzuki	Retired	
Ret	??	(France) Etienne Geeraerd		Yamaha	Retired	
Ret	??	(Finland) Risto Makinen		Yamaha	Retired	
Ret	??	(Sweden) Johnny Bengtsson	Stigefetts Motor	Suzuki	Retired	
Ret	28	(Italy) Virginio Ferrari	Gallina Corse	Suzuki	Retired	
Ret	32	(New Zealand) Stuart Avant	Colemans	Suzuki	Accident	
Ret	8	(United Kingdom) Alex George	Hermetite Racing International	Yamaha	Accident	
Ret	43	(Netherlands) Boet van Dulmen	Laponder Racing	Yamaha	Retired	
Ret	27	(Netherlands) Marcel Ankoné	Nimag Suzuki	Suzuki	Brakes	
Ret	11	(United Kingdom) Chas Mortimer		Suzuki	Retired	
Ret	??	(Finland) Ari Heikkila		Yamaha	Retired	
Ret	44	(Brazil) Edmar Ferreira	Goias Swaep Motor	Yamaha	Retired	
Ret	11	(United Kingdom) Charlie Dobson		Yamaha	Retired	
Ret	17	(Japan) Takazumi Katayama	Takazumi Katayama Sarome Team	Yamaha	Retired	

== 350 cc classification ==
Pos	No.	Rider	Manufacturer	Laps	Time	Grid	Points
1	19	(Italy) Walter Villa	Harley-Davidson	20	47:49.1	1	15
2	4	(Germany) Dieter Braun	Morbidelli	20	+26.2	2	12
3	8	(United Kingdom) Tom Herron	Yamaha	20	+27.0	6	10
4	6	(United Kingdom) Chas Mortimer	Yamaha	20	+29.6	3	8
5	16	(Switzerland) Bruno Kneubühler	Yamaha	20	+39.0		6
6	7	(France) Gérard Choukroun	Yamaha	20	+39.8		5
7	31	(South Africa) Jon Ekerold	Yamaha	20	+42.0		4
8	9	(Spain) Víctor Palomo	Yamaha	20	+43.4		3
9	21	(Australia) John Dodds	Yamaha	20	+43.8		2
10	27	(France) Patrick Fernandez	Yamaha	20	+57.7		1
11	17	(France) Jean-François Baldé	Yamaha	20	+1:01.5		
12	14	(France) Olivier Chevallier	Yamaha	20	+1:13.6		
13	29	(Netherlands) Marcel Ankoné	Yamaha	20	+1:16.9		
14	15	(Austria) Karl Auer	Yamaha	20	+1:34.4		
15	33	(Finland) Pekka Nurmi	Yamaha	20	+1:43.3		
16	37	(Finland) Timo Marala	Yamaha	19	+1 lap		
Ret		(Italy) Gianfranco Bonera	Harley-Davidson			4	
Ret		(Finland) Pentti Korhonen	Yamaha			5	
21 starters in total

== 250 cc classification ==
Pos	No.	Rider	Manufacturer	Laps	Time	Grid	Points
1	1	(Italy) Walter Villa	Harley-Davidson	19	46:45.4	1	15
2	25	(Japan) Takazumi Katayama	Yamaha	19	+33.9	4	12
3	21	(Italy) Gianfranco Bonera	Harley-Davidson	19	+43.8	2	10
4	14	(Finland) Pentti Korhonen	Yamaha	19	+44.2	3	8
5	10	(United Kingdom) Tom Herron	Yamaha	19	+49.1		6
6	2	(Germany) Dieter Braun	Yamaha	19	+51.5	5	5
7	12	(Australia) John Dodds	Yamaha	19	+1:21.8		4
8	27	(France) Patrick Fernandez	Yamaha	19	+1:35.5		3
9	32	(France) Jean-François Baldé	Yamaha	19	+1:43.3		2
10	19	(Netherlands) Henk van Kessel	Yamaha	19	+1:55.5		1
11	17	(France) Olivier Chevallier	Yamaha	19	+1:55.8		
12	41	(Belgium) Etienne Geeraerd	Yamaha	19	+2:19.6		
13	28	(Japan) Ken Nemoto	Yamaha	18	+1 lap		
14	40	(South Africa) Jon Ekerold	Yamaha	18	+1 lap		
15	29	(Czechoslovakia) Peter Baláž	Yamaha	18	+1 lap		
Ret		(Sweden) Leif Gustafsson	Yamaha			6	
21 starters in total

== 125 cc classification ==
Pos	No.	Rider	Manufacturer	Laps	Time	Grid	Points
1	2	(Italy) Pierpaolo Bianchi	Morbidelli	18	46:27.8	1	15
2	14	(Germany) Gert Bender	Bender	18	+53.5	4	12
3	4	(Netherlands) Henk van Kessel	AGV Condor	18	+54.5		10
4	29	(France) Jean-Louis Guignabodet	Morbidelli	18	+1:11.3	5	8
5	1	(Italy) Paolo Pileri	Morbidelli	18	+1:17.7	3	6
6	22	(Switzerland) Stefan Dörflinger	Morbidelli	18	+1:44.8	6	5
7	26	(Germany) Anton Mang	Morbidelli	18	+1:47.7		4
8	18	(Sweden) Per-Edward Carlson	Morbidelli	18	+2:14.2		3
9	11	(Finland) Matti Kinnunen	Morbidelli	18	+2:15.7		2
10	3	(Italy) Eugenio Lazzarini	Morbidelli	18	+2:36.9		1
11	21	(Belgium) Julien van Zeebroeck	Morbidelli	18	+2:37.3		
12	12	(Sweden) Hans Hallberg	Yamaha	17	+1 lap		
13	16	(Switzerland) Xaver Tschannen	Maico	17	+1 lap		
14	7	(Switzerland) Hans Müller	Yamaha	17	+1 lap		
15	19	(Austria) Hans Hummel	Yamaha	17	+1 lap		
16	31	(Sweden) Per Zachrisson	Yamaha	17	+1 lap		
17	35	(Finland) Matti Mäkilä	Yamaha	17	+1 lap		
18	37	(Finland) Jaakko Koskinen	Yamaha	17	+1 lap		
19	9	(Germany) Peter Frohnmeyer	DRS	16	+2 laps		
Ret		(Spain) Ángel Nieto	Bultaco			2	
20 starters in total

== 50 cc classification ==
Pos	No.	Rider	Manufacturer	Laps	Time	Grid	Points
1	3	(Belgium) Julien van Zeebroeck	Kreidler	11	33:44.2	3	15
2	12	(Switzerland) Ulrich Graf	Kreidler	11	+6.7	4	12
3	2	(Italy) Eugenio Lazzarini	Morbidelli	11	+32.8	2	10
4	5	(Germany) Herbert Rittberger	Kreidler	11	+1:00.7	6	8
5	8	(Austria) Hans Hummel	Kreidler	11	+1:30.2		6
6	10	(Netherlands) Theo Timmer	Kreidler	11	+1:33.3		5
7	17	(Switzerland) Rolf Blatter	Kreidler	11	+1:34.9		4
8	15	(Netherlands) Cees van Dongen	Kreidler	11	+2:09.6		3
9	14	(Netherlands) Gerrit Strikker	Kreidler	11	+2:14.9		2
10	20	(Germany) Günter Schirnhofer	Kreidler	11	+2:17.8		1
11	16	(Netherlands) Juup Bosman	Kreidler	11	+2:30.4		1
12	11	(Italy) Aldo Pero	Kreidler	11	+2:36.5		
13	12	(France) Jean-Louis Guignabodet	ABF	11	+2:39.5		
14	19	(Germany) Ingo Emmerich	Kreidler	11	+3:03.0		
15	18	(Sweden) Robert Laver	Kreidler	10	+1 lap		
16	29	(France) Pierre Audry	ABF	10	+1 lap		
17	27	(Sweden) Oscar Ekstrand	Delta	10	+1 lap		
Ret		(Spain) Ángel Nieto	Bultaco			1	
Ret		(Switzerland) Stefan Dörflinger	Kreidler			5	
21 starters in total

Previous race: 1976 Swedish Grand Prix	FIM Grand Prix World Championship; 1976 season	Next race: 1976 Czechoslovak Grand Prix
Previous race: 1975 Finnish Grand Prix	Finnish Grand Prix	Next race: 1977 Finnish Grand Prix
