= Rob Bron =

Dutch motorcycle racer

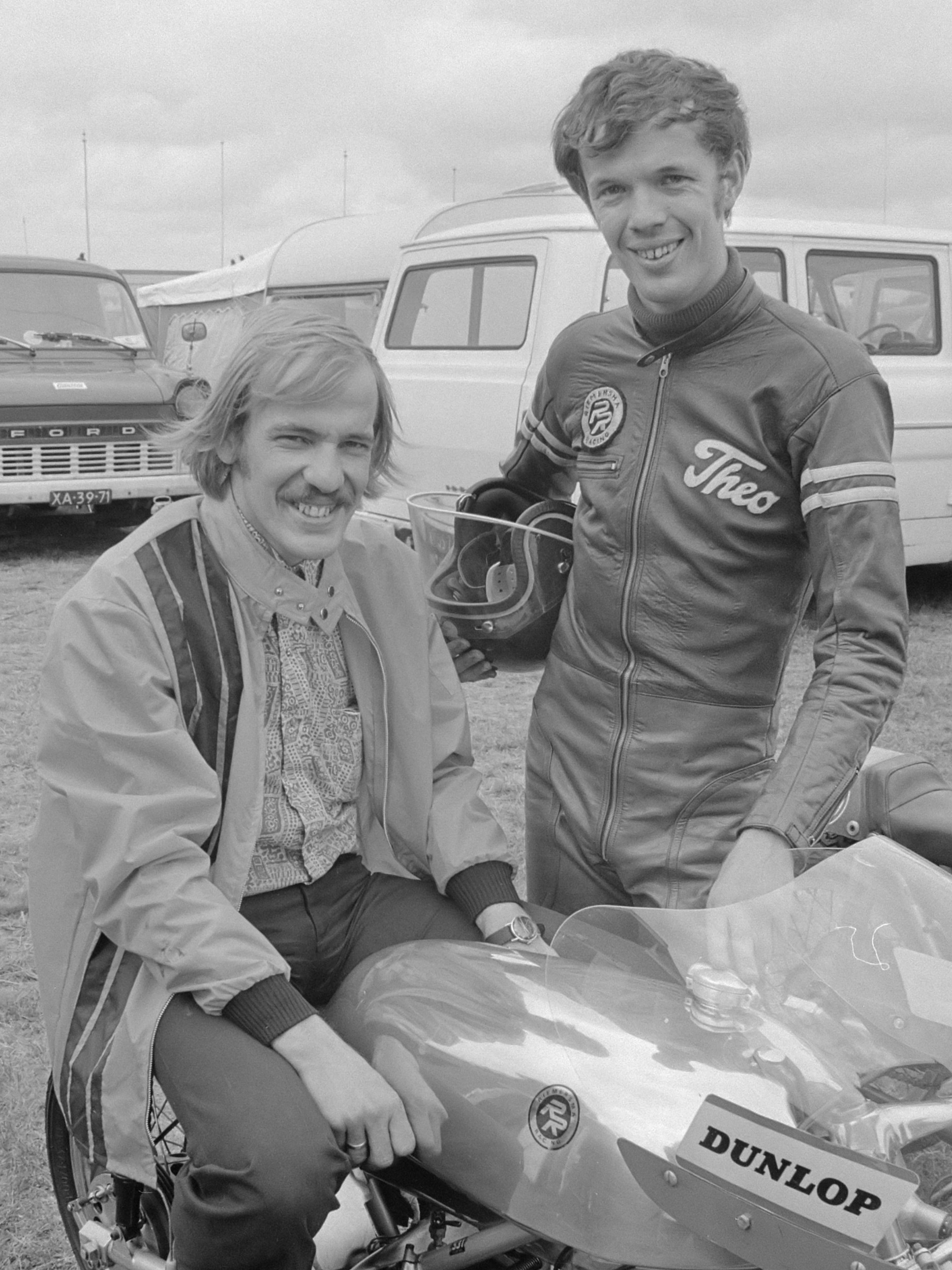
- Rob Bron (l) and Theo Bult (1971)
- Nationality: Dutch
- Born: 16 May 1945; Amsterdam, Netherlands
- Died: 5 October 2009 (aged 64)
Motorcycle racing career statistics
Grand Prix motorcycle racing
Active years	1970 – 1973, 1976
First race	1970 50cc Dutch TT
Last race	1976 500cc Dutch TT
Team	Bron team
Championships	0
Starts / Wins / Podiums / Poles / F. laps / Points; 12 / 0 / 5 / 0 / 0 / 89

Rob Bron (16 May 1945 – 5 October 2009) was a Grand Prix motorcycle road racer from the Netherlands. He had his best year in 1971 when he finished in third place in the 500cc world championship behind Giacomo Agostini and Keith Turner. Bron died on October 5, 2009.

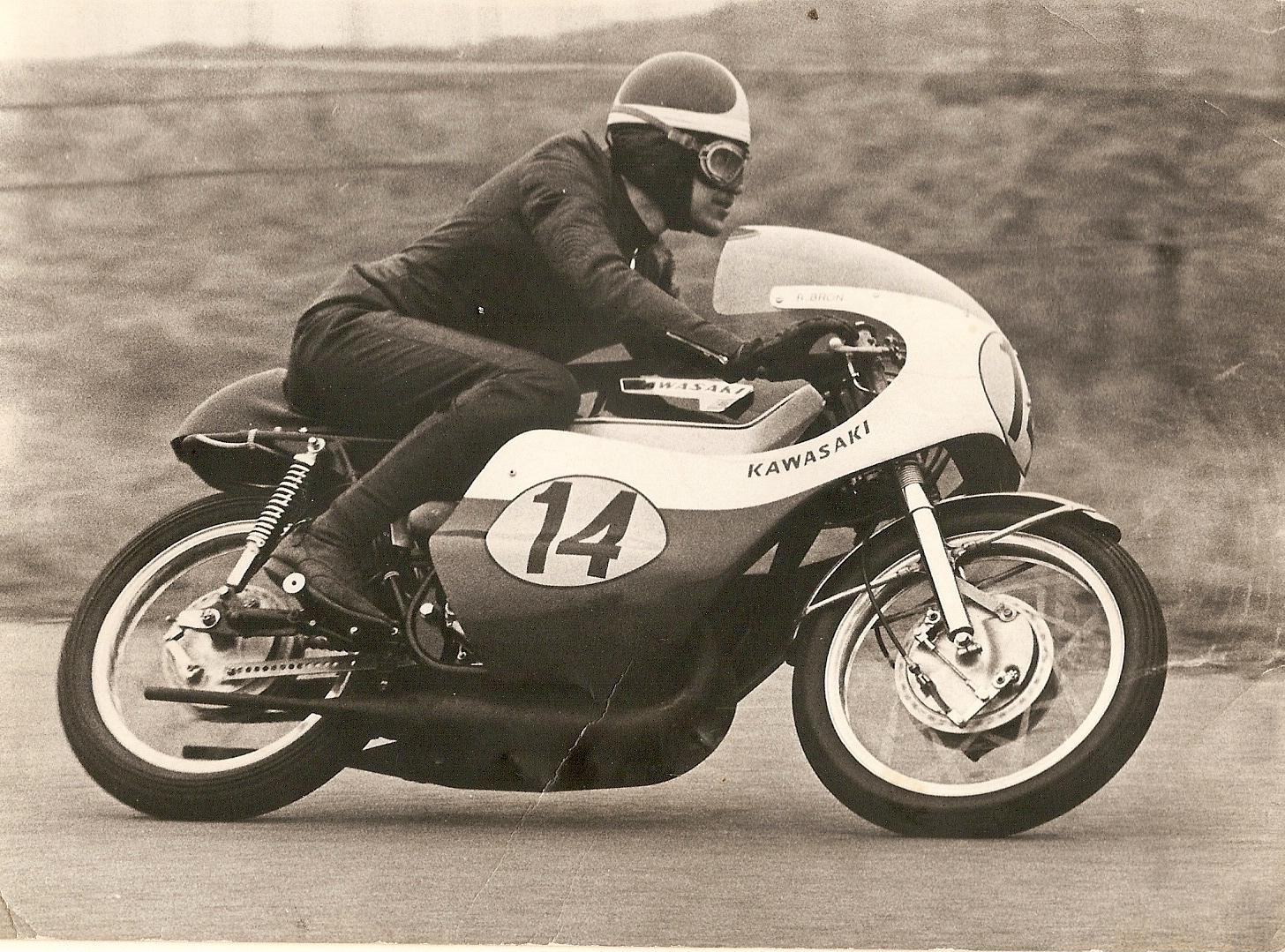
Rob Bron competing at the Zandvoort Circuit

== Career statistics ==
=== Grand Prix motorcycle racing ===
==== Races by year ====
(key) (Races in bold indicate pole position) (Races in italics indicate fastest lap)

Year	Class	Bike	1	2	3	4	5	6	7	8	9	10	11	12	13	Pos.	Pts
1970	50cc	Kreidler	GER	FRA	YUG	NED; 8	BEL	DDR	CZE	ULS	NAT	SPA				26th	3
1970	500cc	Suzuki	GER	FRA	YUG	IOM	NED; 6	BEL	DDR	FIN	ULS	NAT	SPA			32nd	5
1971	500cc	Suzuki	AUT	GER; 2	IOM	NED; 2	BEL; 4	DDR; 8	SWE; Ret	FIN; 3	ULS; 2	NAT	SPA			3rd	57
1972	500cc	Suzuki	GER; Ret	FRA; 3	AUT; 4	NAT	IOM	YUG; Ret	NED; DNS	BEL	DDR	CZE	SWE	FIN	SPA	13th	18
1973	250cc	Yamaha	FRA	AUT	GER	IOM	YUG	NED; 8	BEL; 14	CZE	SWE	FIN	SPA			35th	3
1973	350cc	Yamaha	FRA; 20	AUT	GER	NAT; Ret	IOM	YUG	NED; Ret	CZE	SWE	FIN	SPA			NC	0
1973	500cc	Suzuki	FRA	AUT	GER; 14	IOM	YUG	NED	BEL	CZE	SWE	FIN	SPA			NC	0
1974	350cc	Yamaha	FRA; Ret	GER	AUT	NAT	IOM	NED; Ret	SWE	FIN	YUG	SPA				NC	0
1974	500cc	Yamaha	FRA; Ret	GER	AUT; Ret	NAT	IOM	NED; DNQ	BEL	SWE	FIN	CZE				NC	0
1975	350cc	Yamaha	FRA	SPA	AUT	GER	NAT	IOM	NED; Ret	FIN	CZE	YUG				NC	0
1975	500cc	Suzuki	FRA	AUT	GER	NAT	IOM	NED; 13	BEL	SWE	FIN	CZE				NC	0
1976	350cc	Yamaha	FRA	AUT	NAT	YUG	IOM	NED; DNQ	FIN	CZE	GER	SPA				NC	0
1976	500cc	Yamaha	FRA	AUT	NAT	IOM	NED; 8	BEL	SWE	FIN; 12	CZE	GER				34th	3
1977	350cc	Yamaha	VEN	GER	NAT	SPA	FRA	YUG	NED; 19	SWE	FIN	CZE	GBR			NC	0
1977	500cc	Suzuki	VEN	AUT	GER	NAT	FRA	NED; DNQ	BEL	SWE	FIN	CZE	GBR			NC	0
