= 1971 Grand Prix motorcycle racing season =

Sports season

1971 F.I.M. Grand Prix motorcycle racing season

Seasons
- ← 1970 1972 →

The 1971 Grand Prix motorcycle racing season was the 23rd F.I.M. Road Racing World Championship Grand Prix season. The season consisted of twelve Grand Prix races in six classes: 500cc, 350cc, 250cc, 125cc, 50cc and Sidecars 500cc. It began on 9 May, with Austrian Grand Prix and ended with Spanish Grand Prix on 26 September.

== Season summary ==
Giacomo Agostini claimed his tenth world championship in 1971, passing Carlo Ubbiali and Mike Hailwood as the all time championship leader. However, after the death of Count Domenico Agusta in February 1971, MV Agusta's focus turned to the aviation industry. The Count's passion for motorcycle racing had been the driving force behind the MV Agusta team, and without his presence, the racing team's importance within the company began to wither.

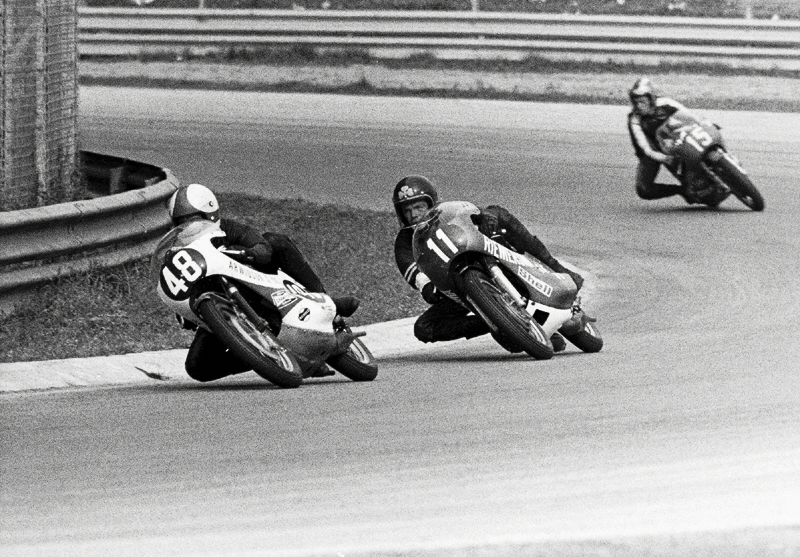
Jarno Saarinen (48) at 1971 Nations Grand Prix

Angel Nieto challenged for the 50cc and 125cc titles however, a crash in the final 50cc race handed the title to Dutchman Jan de Vries. Nieto was able to claim the 125 crown over a young Barry Sheene. Phil Read captured the 250 championship on a private Yamaha-powered Eric Cheney-designed chassis, after falling out with the Yamaha factory. The 1971 250cc East German Grand Prix was notable for the incident that occurred after the race victory by West German rider Dieter Braun. As Das Lied der Deutschen (the West German national anthem), was being played during the winner's ceremony, the East German crowd began singing the words to the anthem. The SED officials reacted by making the East German Grand Prix open only to Eastern Bloc competitors beginning in 1973.

Agostini's record setting winning streak ended at the 1971 Isle of Man TT when his MV Agusta broke down on the first lap of the Junior TT. From the beginning of the 1968 season to the 1971 Isle of Man TT, Agostini won every single race he contested in the 350cc and 500cc classes. By that point, he had won 58 consecutive races, including 26 in the 350cc class and 32 in the 500cc class. Agostini won the 350 title for the fourth year in a row but a newcomer served notice when young Finn, Jarno Saarinen, won his first Grand Prix at the Czechoslovak round then won again in Italy as Yamaha continued to close the performance gap to the dominant MV Agusta team.

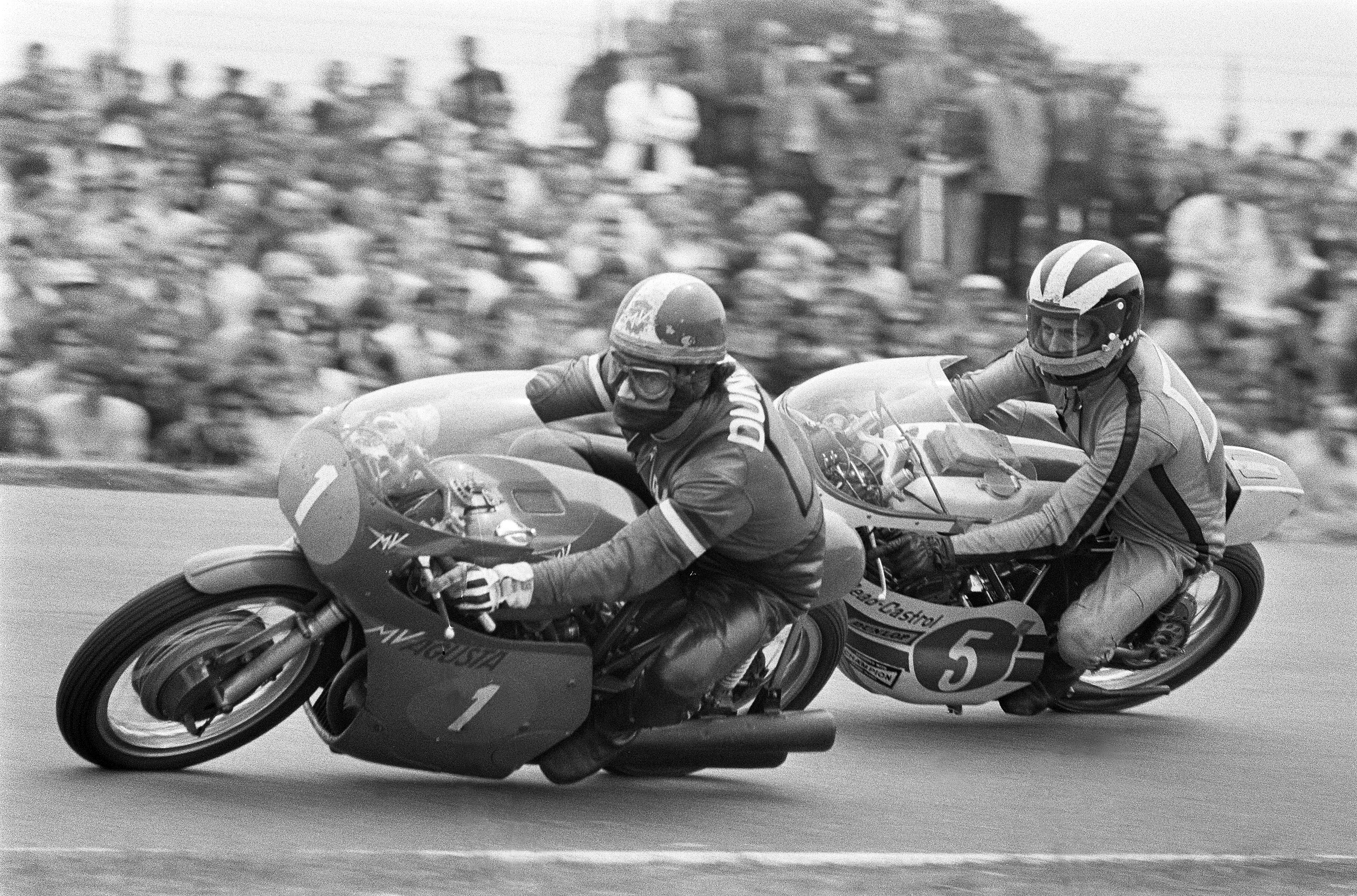
Giacomo Agostini (1) and Phil Read (5) in action during the 1971 350cc Dutch TT.

Agostini had things his way in the 500cc class, winning the first eight rounds of the eleven race series against minimal factory-sponsored opposition. For the second consecutive year a New Zealand rider finished second in the premier class – Ginger Molloy in 1970 and Keith Turner in 1971. Jack Findlay's victory at the 1971 Ulster Grand Prix not only marked the first victory for a Suzuki motorcycle in the premier 500cc class, but also the first-ever 500cc class victory for a motorcycle powered by a two stroke engine. Kawasaki won their first 500cc class victory at the season ending Spanish Grand Prix at Jarama when Dave Simmonds won the race after Agostini sat out the event after already winning the championship. The inaugural Austrian Grand Prix was held at the new high-speed Salzburgring.

== 1971 Grand Prix season calendar ==
Round	Date	Grand Prix	Circuit	50cc winner	125cc winner	250cc winner	350cc winner	500cc winner	Sidecars 500cc winner	Report
1	9 May	(Austria) Austrian Grand Prix	Salzburgring	(Netherlands) Jan de Vries	(Spain) Angel Nieto	(Italy) Silvio Grassetti	(Italy) Giacomo Agostini	(Italy) Giacomo Agostini	(Germany) Butscher / Huber	Report
2	16 May	(West Germany) West German Grand Prix	Hockenheimring	(Netherlands) Jan de Vries	(United Kingdom) Dave Simmonds	(United Kingdom) Phil Read	(Italy) Giacomo Agostini	(Italy) Giacomo Agostini	(Germany) Auerbacher / Hahn	Report
3	12 June	Isle of Man TT	Snaefell Mountain		(United Kingdom) Chas Mortimer	(United Kingdom) Phil Read	(United Kingdom) Tony Jefferies	(Italy) Giacomo Agostini	(Germany) Schauzu / Kalauch	Report
4	26 June	(Netherlands) Dutch TT	Assen	(Spain) Angel Nieto	(Spain) Angel Nieto	(United Kingdom) Phil Read	(Italy) Giacomo Agostini	(Italy) Giacomo Agostini	(Germany) Owesle / Kremer	Report
5	4 July	(Belgium) Belgian Grand Prix	Spa-Francorchamps	(Netherlands) Jan de Vries	(United Kingdom) Barry Sheene	(Italy) Silvio Grassetti		(Italy) Giacomo Agostini	(Germany) Schauzu / Kalauch	Report
6	11 July	(East Germany) East German Grand Prix	Sachsenring	(Spain) Angel Nieto	(Spain) Angel Nieto	(West Germany) Dieter Braun	(Italy) Giacomo Agostini	(Italy) Giacomo Agostini		Report
7	18 July	(Czechoslovakia) Czechoslovak Grand Prix	Brno	(United Kingdom) Barry Sheene	(Spain) Angel Nieto	(Hungary) János Drapál	(Finland) Jarno Saarinen		(Germany) Schauzu / Kalauch	Report
8	25 July	(Sweden) Swedish Grand Prix	Anderstorp	(Spain) Angel Nieto	(United Kingdom) Barry Sheene	(United Kingdom) Rodney Gould	(Italy) Giacomo Agostini	(Italy) Giacomo Agostini		Report
9	1 August	(Finland) Finnish Grand Prix	Imatra		(United Kingdom) Barry Sheene	(United Kingdom) Rodney Gould	(Italy) Giacomo Agostini	(Italy) Giacomo Agostini	(Germany) (United Kingdom) Owesle / Rutterford	Report
10	14 August	(Northern Ireland) Ulster Grand Prix	Dundrod			(Northern Ireland) Ray McCullough	(United Kingdom) Peter Williams	(Australia) Jack Findlay	(Germany) (United Kingdom) Owesle / Rutterford	Report
11	12 September	(Italy) Nations Grand Prix	Monza	(Netherlands) Jan de Vries	(Italy) Gilberto Parlotti	(Switzerland) Gyula Marsovsky	(Finland) Jarno Saarinen	(Italy) Alberto Pagani		Report
12	26 September	(Spain) Spanish Grand Prix	Jarama	(Netherlands) Jan de Vries	(Spain) Angel Nieto	(Finland) Jarno Saarinen	(Finland) Teuvo Länsivuori	(United Kingdom) Dave Simmonds		Report

== Final standings ==
=== Scoring system ===
Points were awarded to the top ten finishers in each race. Only the best of six races were counted on 50cc, 125cc, 350cc and 500cc championships, best of seven in 250cc, while in the Sidecars, the best of five races were counted.

Position	1st	2nd	3rd	4th	5th	6th	7th	8th	9th	10th
Points	15	12	10	8	6	5	4	3	2	1

==== 500cc final standings ====
Pos	Rider	Machine	AUT (Austria)	GER (Germany)	MAN (Isle of Man)	HOL (Netherlands)	BEL (Belgium)	DDR (East Germany)	SWE (Sweden)	FIN (Finland)	ULS (Northern Ireland)	NAC (Italy)	ESP (Spain)	Pts
1	(Italy) Giacomo Agostini	MV Agusta	1	1	1	1	1	1	1	1		Ret		**90** (120)
2	(New Zealand) Keith Turner	Coleman-Suzuki	2	Ret	7	4	Ret	2	2	4	Ret	6	5	**58** (67)
3	(Netherlands) Rob Bron	Suzuki		2		2	4	8	Ret	3	2			**57**
4	(United Kingdom) Dave Simmonds	Kawasaki		Ret		3	Ret		6	2		3	1	**52**
5	(Australia) Jack Findlay	Suzuki / Jawa	4	Ret		Ret	3		10	5	1	5	6	**50** (51)
6	(France) Eric Offenstadt	Kawasaki	3	Ret		Ret	2	Ret	Ret	Ret	Ret		3	**32**
7	(Northern Ireland) Tommy Robb	Hurst-Seeley / Matchless		6	15	7	Ret		3	9	3			**31**
8	(Italy) Alberto Pagani	Linto / MV Agusta	7	5	Ret	Ret	Ret		Ret	7		1		**29**
9	(Finland) Kaarlo Koivuniemi	Seeley-Matchless						5	5	Ret			2	**24**
10	(United Kingdom) Ron Chandler	Kawasaki		3		Ret	5		Ret		8	Ret		**19**
11	(United Kingdom) Frank Perris	Suzuki / Seeley / Linto			3		7		Ret	Ret		Ret		**14**
12	(Germany) Lothar John	Yamaha	5	Ret		12	Ret	Ret	Ret	8		7		**13**
13	(Italy) Gianpiero Zubani	Kawasaki	Ret									2		**12**
14	(United Kingdom) Peter Williams	Arter-Matchless			2									**12**
15	(Sweden) Bo Granath	Husqvarna				8	Ret	Ret	8	Ret	6	10	Ret	**12**
16	(United Kingdom) Billie Nelson	Paton	6			6	10							**11**
17	(Germany) Ernst Hiller	Kawasaki	Ret	11		Ret	Ret	3						**10**
18	(United Kingdom) Maurice Hawthorne	Kawasaki	Ret	4		Ret	Ret	Ret		Ret		Ret	Ret	**8**
19	(Switzerland) Hans-Rudolf Brünger	Bultaco						4					Ret	**8**
20	(Spain) Benjamin Grau	Bultaco											4	**8**
=	(Wales) Selwyn Griffiths	Cowles-Matchless			4									**8**
=	(Sweden) Ulfe Nilsson	Seeley-Matchless							4					**8**
=	(United Kingdom) Phil Read	Ducati										4		**8**
=	(United Kingdom) Percy Tait	Seeley-Matchless									4			**8**
25	(Sweden) Ivan Carlsson	Yamaha	Ret	Ret		11	6	Ret	Ret			Ret	9	**7**
26	(United Kingdom) Jim Curry	Seeley-Matchless		Ret		5	Ret							**6**
27	(Northern Ireland) Gerry Mateer	Norton			Ret						5			**6**
=	(United Kingdom) Gordon Pantall	Padgett-Kawasaki			5						Ret			**6**
29	(Austria) Karl Auer	Matchless	Ret	Ret				6				Ret		**5**
30	(Finland) Matti Salonen	Yamaha						Ret	Ret	6				**5**
31	(United Kingdom) Roger Sutcliffe	Matchless			6									**5**
32	(Germany) Hans-Otto Butenuth	BMW		7	10	Ret				Ret				**5**
33	(Netherlands) Piet Van der Wal	Kawasaki				Ret	9	Ret				8		**5**
34	(Australia) Peter Jones	Suzuki			19				Ret				7	**4**
35	(Switzerland) Jean Campiche	Honda						7				Ret		**4**
36	(Northern Ireland) Tom Herron	Seeley									7			**4**
=	(Sweden) Morgan Radberg	Monark							7					**4**
38	(Germany) Kurt-Willy Bertsch	BMW		8										**3**
=	(Spain) Joan Bordons	Bultaco											8	**3**
=	(United Kingdom) Jerry Lancaster	Yamaha					8							**3**
=	(United Kingdom) Charlie Sanby	Seeley-Matchless			8									**3**
42	(Germany) Paul Eickelberg	Yamaha				9				10		Ret		**3**
43	(Sweden) Johnny Bengtsson	Kawasaki							9	Ret				**2**
=	(Finland) Pentti Lehtelä	Yamaha						9		Ret				**2**
45	(United Kingdom) Tom Dickie	Cowles-Matchless			9									**2**
=	(Germany) Horst Dzierzawa	Yamaha		9										**2**
=	(Italy) Giuseppe Mongardi	Ducati										9		**2**
=	(Northern Ireland) Donnie Robinson	Padgett-Yamaha									9			**2**
49	(Australia) John Dodds	König	Ret	10		Ret	Ret	Ret	Ret		Ret	Ret		**1**
50	(Italy) Emanuele Maugliani	Seeley-Matchless											10	**1**
=	(Netherlands) Rob Noorlander	Norton				10								**1**
=	(United Kingdom) Stan Woods	Norton									10			**1**
53	(United Kingdom) Brian Moses	Norton			11						16			**0**
54	(United Kingdom) Charlie Dobson	Seeley		Ret					Ret	Ret	11			**0**
55	(Austria) Werner Bergold	Kawasaki	Ret	11				Ret						**0**
56	(Algeria) Larbi Habbiche	Yamaha											11	**0**
57	(United Kingdom) Robert Graham	Norton			Ret						12			**0**
58	(United Kingdom) Norman Price	Norton			12									**0**
59	(United Kingdom) Alan Lawton	Norton			13						13			**0**
60	(Germany) Rolf Rott	Kawasaki		13										**0**
61	(United Kingdom) Derek Lee	Matchless									14			**0**
=	(United Kingdom) Roger Nichols	Matchless			14									**0**
63	(Northern Ireland) Roy Reid	Seeley			32						15			**0**
64	(United Kingdom) Roy Bisbey	Norton			16									**0**
65	(United Kingdom) Geoff Barry	Oakley-Matchless / Seeley			17						Ret			**0**
66	(United Kingdom) Brian Scully	Scott									17			**0**
67	(Northern Ireland) Bob Ramsey	Seeley									18			**0**
=	(United Kingdom) Jeff Wade	Tickle Manx Norton			18									**0**
69	(United Kingdom) Chris Neve	Seeley			30						19			**0**
70	(United Kingdom) Don Harris	Norton			20									**0**
71	(United Kingdom) Dave Foulkes	Norton			21									**0**
72	(United Kingdom) Jeff Boniface	Norton			22									**0**
73	(United Kingdom) Brian Edwards	Norton			23									**0**
74	(United Kingdom) Fred Walton	Velocette-Metisse			24									**0**
75	(United Kingdom) Len Williams	Aermacchi			25									**0**
76	(United Kingdom) Tom Loughridge	Suzuki			26									**0**
77	(United Kingdom) Gordon Daniels	TWS Suzuki			27									**0**
78	(United Kingdom) Jim Ashton	Seeley			28									**0**
79	(United Kingdom) John Stanley	Seeley			29									**0**
80	(United Kingdom) Trevor Armstrong	Norton			31									**0**
–	(Switzerland) Gyula Marsovszky	Linto	Ret	Ret		Ret	Ret	Ret	Ret	Ret	Ret	Ret		**0**
–	(Netherlands) Theo Louwes	Kawasaki	Ret	Ret		Ret	Ret	Ret						**0**
–	(Finland) Hannu Kuparinen	Suzuki	Ret			Ret		Ret		Ret				**0**
–	(United Kingdom) Martin Carney	Kawasaki		Ret			Ret	Ret			Ret			**0**
–	(France) Cristian Ravel	Kawasaki	Ret	Ret		Ret	Ret							**0**
–	(United Kingdom) Alan Barnett	Aermacchi			Ret	Ret	Ret							**0**
–	(Italy) Silvano Bertarelli	Kawasaki	Ret	Ret								Ret		**0**
–	(Germany) Karl Hoppe	König	Ret			Ret		Ret						**0**
–	(Sweden) Börje Andersson	Honda							Ret	Ret				**0**
–	(United Kingdom) Vincent Duckett	Seeley			Ret						Ret			**0**
–	(Italy) Roberto Gallina	Paton	Ret									Ret		**0**
–	(United Kingdom) Steve Ellis	Yamaha				Ret			Ret					**0**
–	(Sweden) Sven-Olov Gunnarsson	Kawasaki						Ret		Ret				**0**
–	(United Kingdom) Tony Jefferies	Arter-Matchless			Ret						Ret			**0**
–	(Finland) Kai Kuparinen	Suzuki						Ret		Ret				**0**
–	(Northern Ireland) Billy McCosh	Seeley			Ret						Ret			**0**
–	(New Zealand) Ginger Molloy	Kawasaki	Ret	Ret										**0**
–	(Denmark) Borge Nielsen	Honda							Ret	Ret				**0**
–	(United Kingdom) Bill Smith	Seeley / Kawasaki			Ret						Ret			**0**
–	(United Kingdom) John Williams	Arter-Matchless			Ret						Ret			**0**
–	(United Kingdom) Brian Adams	Norton			Ret						Ret			**0**
–	(Northern Ireland) Abe Alexander	Seeley									Ret			**0**
–	(United Kingdom) Tony Anderson	Matchless			Ret									**0**
–	(United Kingdom) Martin Ashwood	Quaife Metisse			Ret									**0**
–	(Italy) Sergio Baroncini	Ducati										Ret		**0**
–	(Sweden) Jöram Blom	Seeley							Ret					**0**
–	(Austria) Hans Braumandl	Matchless	Ret											**0**
–	(United Kingdom) Clive Brown	Norton			Ret									**0**
–	(Italy) Paolo Campanelli	Kawasaki										Ret		**0**
–	(United Kingdom) Alistair Copeland	Norton			Ret									**0**
–	(United Kingdom) Walter Dawson	Norton			Ret									**0**
–	(Australia) Terry Dennehy	Honda				Ret								**0**
–	(United Kingdom) Derek Filler	Seeley			Ret									**0**
–	(United Kingdom) George Fogarty	Cunningham-Suzuki			Ret									**0**
–	(United Kingdom) Bill Fulton	Stafford-Matchless			Ret									**0**
–	(United Kingdom) Denis Gallagher	Seeley									Ret			**0**
–	(United Kingdom) Alex George	Kawasaki			Ret									**0**
–	(United Kingdom) Peter Gibson	Seeley			Ret									**0**
–	(United Kingdom) Tony Godfrey	Tickle Manx Norton			Ret									**0**
–	(Northern Ireland) Campbell Gorman	Seeley									Ret			**0**
–	(United Kingdom) Don Grant	Norton			Ret									**0**
–	(United Kingdom) Terry Grotefeld	Padgett-Yamaha			Ret									**0**
–	(Northern Ireland) Billie Guthrie	Yamaha									Ret			**0**
–	(Finland) Osmo Hansen	Linto								Ret				**0**
–	(Norway) Morten Hauger	Honda							Ret					**0**
–	(Northern Ireland) Harris Healey	Norton									Ret			**0**
–	(United Kingdom) Bob Health	BSA			Ret									**0**
–	(United Kingdom) Keith Heckles	Norton			Ret									**0**
–	(Finland) Ari Heikkilä	Matchless								Ret				**0**
–	(United Kingdom) John Hughes	Yamaha			Ret									**0**
–	(Germany) Albert Hund	Honda		Ret										**0**
–	(Germany) Ted Janssen	Suzuki		Ret										**0**
–	(United Kingdom) Malcolm Jefery	Norton			Ret									**0**
–	(Sweden) Lasse Johansson	HM							Ret					**0**
–	(Hungary) Arpad Juhos	Aermacchi						Ret						**0**
–	(Republic of Ireland) Austin Kinsella	Matchless									Ret			**0**
–	(United Kingdom) Ray Knight	Hughes-Triumph			Ret									**0**
–	(Germany) Udo Kochanski	BMW		Ret										**0**
–	(Germany) Otto Labitzke	BMW			Ret									**0**
–	(Germany) Horst Lahfeld	König		Ret										**0**
–	(Italy) Vasco Loro	Yamaha										Ret		**0**
–	(Austria) Alois Maxwald	Linto	Ret											**0**
–	(Northern Ireland) Ray McCullough	Seeley									Ret			**0**
–	(Northern Ireland) Ian McGregor	Norton									Ret			**0**
–	(Northern Ireland) Stephen Murray	Seeley									Ret			**0**
–	(United Kingdom) Godfrey Nash	Honda							Ret					**0**
–	(Finland) Oiva Papunen	Kawasaki							Ret					**0**
–	(Finland) Anssi Resko	Suzuki								Ret				**0**
–	(Switzerland) Walter Rungg	Aermacchi				Ret								**0**
–	(Sweden) Hasse Rutgersson	HRS							Ret					**0**
–	(Germany) Reinhard Scholtis	Kawasaki		Ret										**0**
–	(Germany) Alfred Schwander	Suzuki		Ret										**0**
–	(Italy) Bruno Spaggiari	Ducati										Ret		**0**
–	(Sweden) Bo Strandell	Linto							Ret					**0**
–	(Denmark) Claus Tarum	Honda							Ret					**0**
–	(United Kingdom) Ken Tilley	Norton			Ret									**0**
–	(Germany) Jupp Tröblinger	König		Ret										**0**
–	(United Kingdom) Dennis Trollope	Seeley			Ret									**0**
–	(Australia) Brian Walsh	Norton			Ret									**0**
–	(United Kingdom) Carl Ward	Norton			Ret									**0**
–	(Austria) Manfred Weingartner	Matchless	Ret											**0**
–	(Austria) Max Wiener	Aermacchi	Ret											**0**
–	(United Kingdom) Louis With	Kawasaki							Ret					**0**
–	(United Kingdom) Ray Wittich	Saunders-Norton			Ret									**0**
–	(Italy) Benedetto Zambotti	Kawasaki										Ret		**0**
Pos	Rider	Bke	AUT (Austria)	GER (Germany)	MAN (Isle of Man)	HOL (Netherlands)	BEL (Belgium)	DDR (East Germany)	SWE (Sweden)	FIN (Finland)	ULS (Northern Ireland)	NAC (Italy)	ESP (Spain)	Pts

Colour	Result
Gold	Winner
Silver	Second place
Bronze	Third place
Green	Points classification
Blue	Non-points classification
Blue	Non-classified finish (NC)
Purple	Retired, not classified (Ret)
Red	Did not qualify (DNQ)
Red	Did not pre-qualify (DNPQ)
Black	Disqualified (DSQ)
White	Did not start (DNS)
White	Withdrew (WD)
White	Race cancelled (C)
Blank	Did not practice (DNP)
Blank	Did not arrive (DNA)
Blank	Excluded (EX)

**Bold** – Pole
Italics – Fastest Lap

=== 1971 350 cc Roadracing World Championship final standings ===
Place	Rider	Number	Country	Machine	Points	Wins
1	(Italy) Giacomo Agostini	1	Italy	MV Agusta	90	6
2	(Finland) Jarno Saarinen		Finland	Yamaha	63	2
3	(Sweden) Ivan Carlsson		Sweden	Yamaha	39	0
4	(Netherlands) Theo Bult		Netherlands	Yamaha	36	0
5	(United Kingdom) Paul Smart		United Kingdom	Yamaha	34	0
6	(Switzerland) Werner Pfirter		Switzerland	Yamaha	33	0
7	(Sweden) Bo Granath	10	Sweden	Yamaha	30	0
7	(Hungary) László Szabó		Hungary	Yamaha	29	0
9	(United Kingdom) Tony Jefferies		United Kingdom	Yamaha	25	1
10	(Finland) Teuvo Lansivuori		Finland	Yamaha	25	1

=== 1971 250 cc Roadracing World Championship final standings ===
Place	Rider	Number	Country	Machine	Points	Wins
1	(United Kingdom) Phil Read		United Kingdom	Yamaha	73	3
2	(United Kingdom) Rodney Gould	1	United Kingdom	Yamaha	68	2
3	(Finland) Jarno Saarinen	4	Finland	Yamaha	64	1
4	(Australia) John Dodds		Australia	Yamaha	59	0
5	(West Germany) Dieter Braun		West Germany	Yamaha	58	1
6	(Switzerland) Gyula Marsovsky	7	Switzerland	Yamaha	57	1
7	(Italy) Silvio Grassetti	10	Italy	MZ	43	2
8	(United Kingdom) Chas Mortimer	6	United Kingdom	Yamaha	42	0
9	(Hungary) János Drapál		Hungary	Yamaha	26	1
10	(Netherlands) Theo Bult	20	Netherlands	Yamaha	22	0

=== 1971 125 cc Roadracing World Championship final standings ===
Place	Rider	Number	Country	Machine	Points	Wins
1	(Spain) Angel Nieto	1	Spain	Derbi	87	5
2	(United Kingdom) Barry Sheene		United Kingdom	Suzuki	79	3
3	(Sweden) Börje Jansson	3	Sweden	Maico	64	0
4	(West Germany) Dieter Braun		West Germany	Maico	54	0
5	(United Kingdom) Chas Mortimer		United Kingdom	Yamaha	48	1
6	(United Kingdom) Dave Simmonds	4	United Kingdom	Kawasaki	48	1
7	(West Germany) Gert Bender		West Germany	Maico	41	0
8	(Italy) Gilberto Parlotti		Italy	Morbidelli	39	1
9	(Sweden) Kent Andersson		Sweden	Yamaha	30	0
10	(East Germany) Jurgen Lenk		East Germany	MZ	27	0

=== 1971 50 cc Roadracing World Championship final standings ===
Place	Rider	Number	Country	Machine	Points	Wins
1	(Netherlands) Jan De Vries	5	Netherlands	Kreidler	75	5
2	(Spain) Angel Nieto	1	Spain	Derbi	69	3
3	(Netherlands) Jos Schurgers	6	Netherlands	Kreidler	42	0
4	(Netherlands) Herman Meyers	10	Netherlands	Jamathi	41	0
5	(West Germany) Rudolf Kunz		West Germany	Kreidler	36	0
6	(Netherlands) Aalt Toersen		Netherlands	Jamathi	24	0
7	(United Kingdom) Barry Sheene		United Kingdom	Kreidler	23	1
8	(Italy) Gilberto Parlotti	9	Italy	Derbi	22	0
9	(Spain) Federico van der Hoeven		Netherlands	Derbi	22	0
10	(Netherlands) Jan Bruins		Netherlands	Kreidler	19	0
