= Frascoli =

Frascoli is an Italian surname. Notable people with the surname include:

- Rodolfo Frascoli, Italian motorcycle designer
- Sergio Frascoli (born 1936), Italian footballer
