= Motorcycle industry in China =

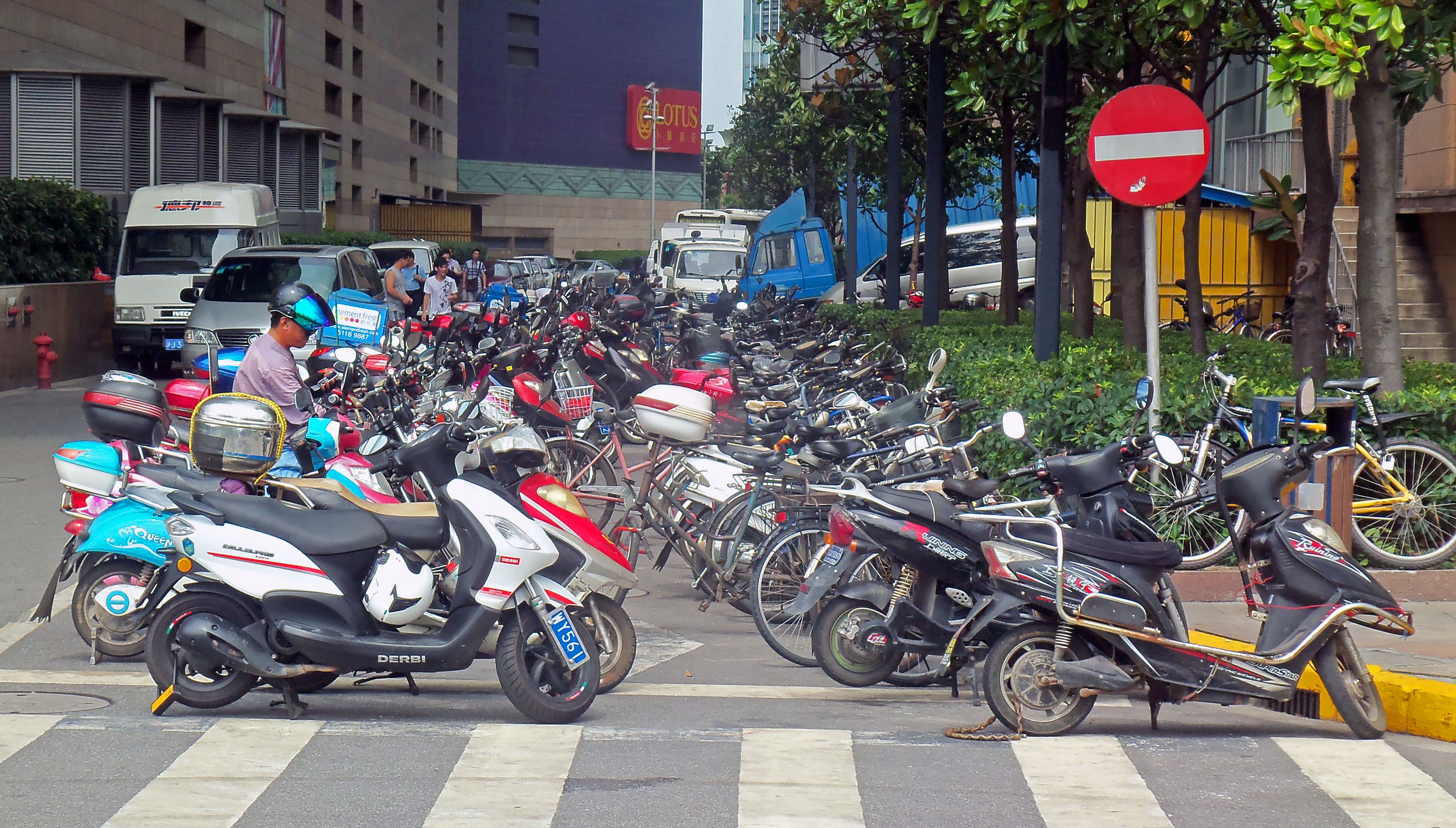
Motorcycles parked in Lujiazui

The motorcycle industry of the People's Republic of China is the second largest in the world after India with a motorcycle output of 17 million in 2019 this is down from 22,891,700 in 2013, when 39.75% of the total production was exported. China also produces auto rickshaws, all-terrain vehicles, and motorcycle components and accessories in great numbers.

In 2013 the total revenue of the Chinese motorcycle industry increased by 3.24% year on year to RMB 112,621 million; including a year-on-year profit increase of 20.24% to RMB 3,322 million. This profit increase was mainly attributed to technical improvement and higher added value on motorcycles despite the sales volume decreases suffered during industrial transformation in recent years.

== History ==
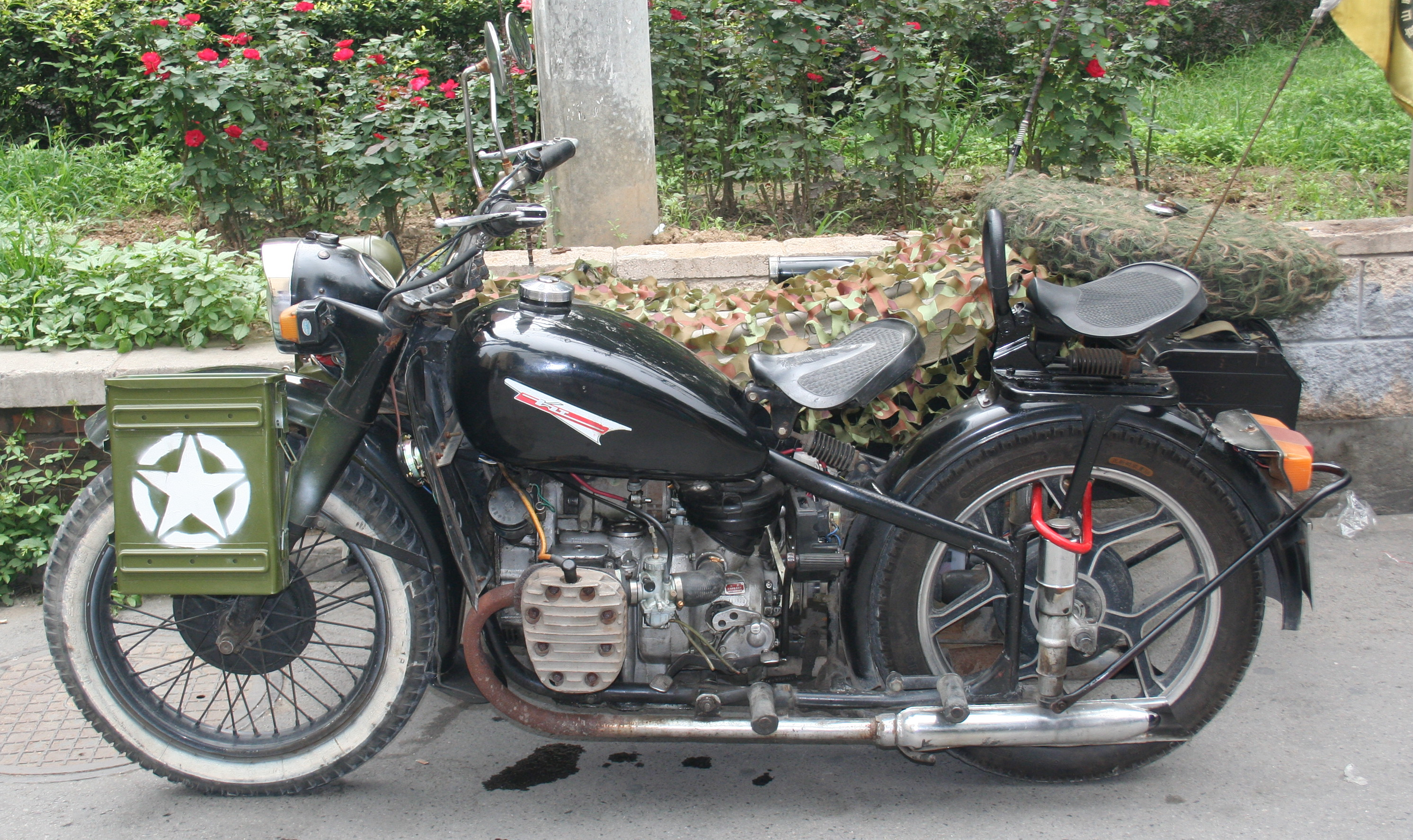
PLA motorcycle in Beijing in 2005

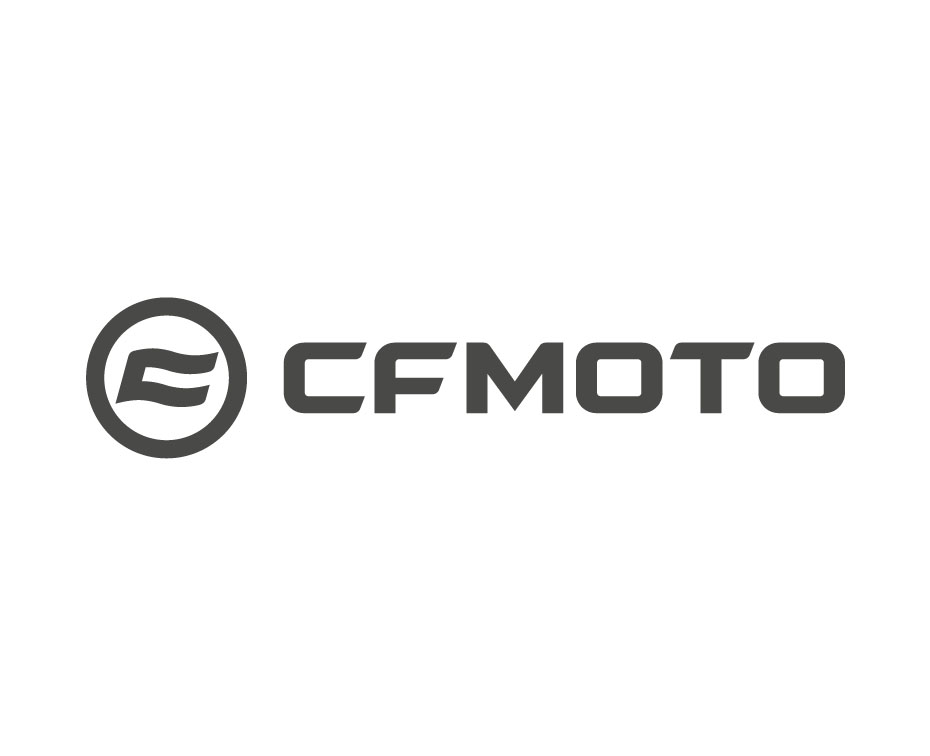
CFMoto

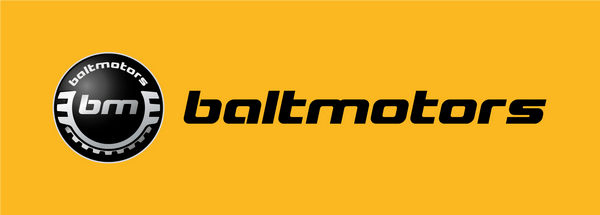
Baltmotors

Motorcycle manufacture in China first began in 1951, when the People's Liberation Army began producing a 500cc motorcycle to meet the country's military requirements during the Korean War. It was developed on the lines of the K500, a German model used in World War II. Before the end of the 1970s, motorcycles produced in China were used mainly by the military services, the major exception being the Beijing Motorcycle Factory, which from 1958 onwards produced motorcycles for the general public that were based on the German pre war BMW R71 and Russian Ural and Dnepr models. In 1979, in Chongqing city, military munitions factory China Jialing Industrial Company began to independently manufacture motorcycles for civilian use, ushering in the modern era of Chinese motorcycle production. In 2000, the Chinese industry took over as the biggest motorcycle producer in the world, a position that it has maintained.

== Geography of the industry ==
China's motorcycle manufacturing industry is centred on 3 main regions- Guangdong and Zhejiang provinces and Chongqing city in the Chongqing municipality (the biggest centre of motorcycle production in the world).

== Domestic industry ==
China's domestic motorcycle market has suffered a downturn in recent years due to the banning of motorcycles in many Chinese urban centres. China's domestic motorcycle sales reached a high of around 19,000,000 units in 2009 and then suffered gradual decreases for 4 consecutive years. In 2013, the market decreased by 5.73% from 2012 to 13,880,000 units, 26.94% less than 2009. Domestic sales decreased due to ban on motorcycles in urban centres, the national economic transformation and the rural market downturn. In Chinese rural areas, motorcycles are used for a variety of purposes, including personal transportation, passenger vehicles, and cargo transportation. Improved living standard in these areas in recent years has led to the replacement of motorcycles with mini-cars and e-bikes.

== Export industry ==
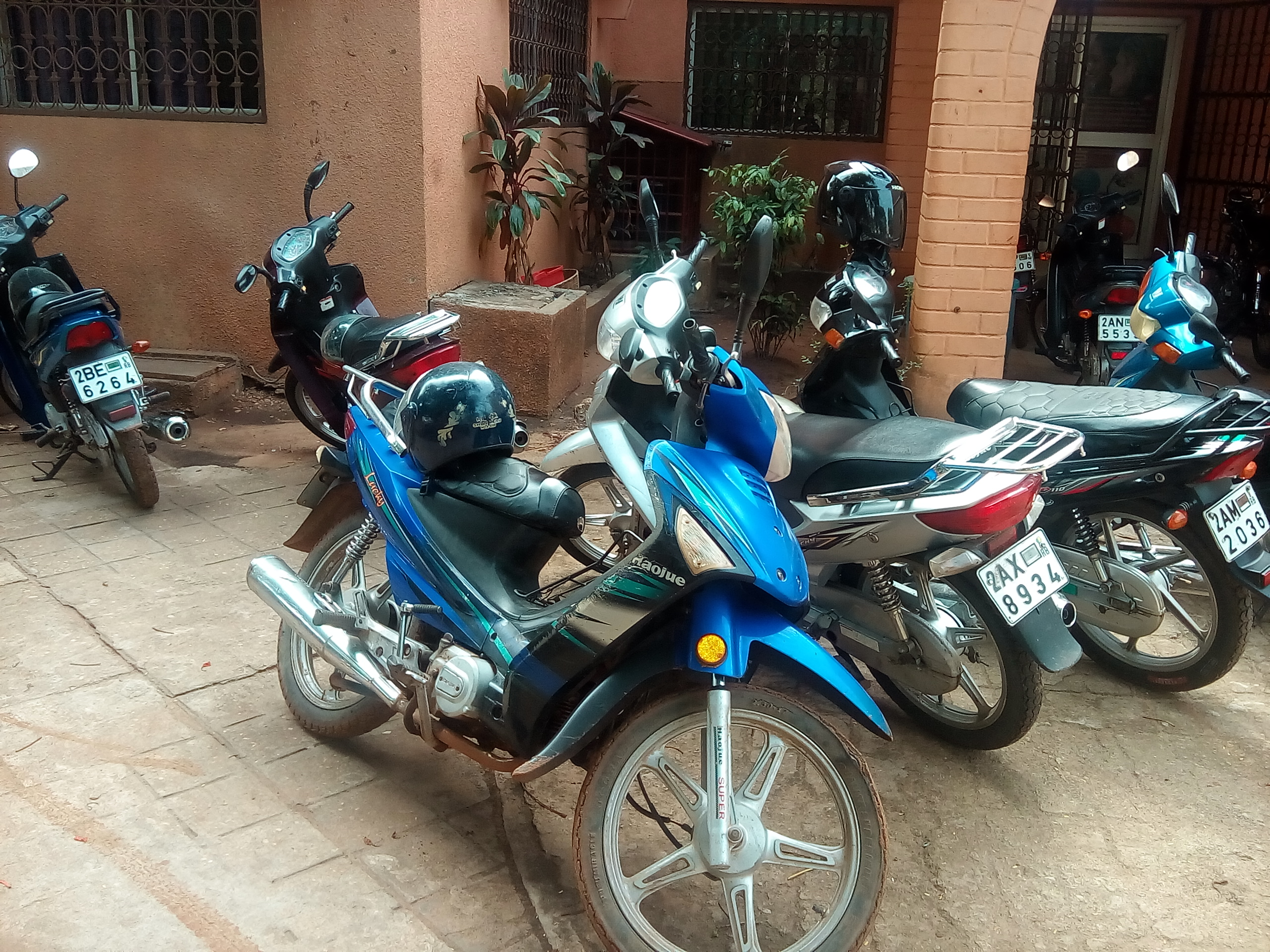
Haojue motorcycle in Africa (2020)

During the first 11 months of 2013 China exported 9,128,400 motorcycles totaling RMB 4,865 million at an average price of US$532.92 to 198 countries and regions. Export to Asia, Middle East, Africa, and Latin America accounted for 87.57% of the total export volume, with Myanmar, Nigeria, Argentina, Venezuela, Philippines, Togo, Mexico, Russia, Angola, Saudi Arabia, and Colombia topping the export destination list. A total of 4,639,600 motorcycles were exported to these top 10 countries, accounting for 50.83% of total export.

Global demand for Chinese motorcycles has taken a hit over the past couple of years, with various political and financial crises in many markets seriously disrupting the ability for manufacturers to profitably get their motorcycles to the end consumers. Both the financial problems in Argentina and the political problems in Egypt are examples of markets recently becoming completely unavailable to manufacturers.

== Parts and accessories ==
China is also a leading producer of motorcycle parts and accessories. In 2013, motorcycle engine export saw a year-on-year increase of 0.87% to 26,191,300 units.

== Manufacturers ==
China has more than 200 individual companies producing motorcycles nationally. China's leading motorcycle manufacturers include Jiangmen Dachangjiang Group (subsidiary of Haojue Holdings brand), Lifan, Loncin, Zongshen, Jialing, Jianshe, Qianjiang (who sold motorcycle with Keeway, QJmotor, Benelli and MBP Moto brands), Haojin, Shineray, Bashan, Jonway, Wuxi Futong.

== Joint ventures ==
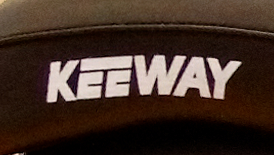
Keeway, a subsidiary of Qianjiang Group

Several Chinese motorcycle companies cooperate in joint ventures with foreign motorcycle manufacturers including Loncin (BMW), Zongshen (Piaggio and Norton Motorcycle Company), Qingqi (Suzuki, Hyosung, and Peugeot), Jianshe (Yamaha), Haojue (Suzuki), Qianjiang (owners of Benelli), Jialing (Honda), Znen (owners of Moto Morini), Shineray Group (owners of SWM Motors). These joint ventures are different in every case, and range from research, development and production ventures through to distribution, sales and marketing joint ventures.

Chinese manufacturers have also partnered with European design houses to produce unique new models. CFMOTO works with Austrian designers Kiska to develop their new motorcycles. KTM and CFMOTO have had a joint venture since 2011.

Shineray recently leased Husqvarna's factory in Biandronno, Italy and acquired the rights to produce several of their models under the resurrected SWM brand. Shineray will also use the leases to produce models under their SWM brand, which will be imported to China.

Zhongneng Vehicle Group acquired in 2018 Italian brand Moto Morini

== Key industry figures ==
- Li Bin - is the chairman of CAAM (China Association of Automobile manufacturers) motorcycle section.
- David McMullan - is the International Magazine Editor of ChinaMotor magazine (also known as Mega Chinamotor), Chinese motorcycle trade exhibition organiser (including the China International Motorcycle Trade Exhibition (CIMAmotor)) and industry consultant for the Chinese motorcycle industry.
- Yin Mingshan - the founder of Lifan Group
- Zuo Zongshen - the founder and owner of Zongshen motorcycles.
- Wang Min- Chairman of the China Chamber of Commerce (motorcycles)

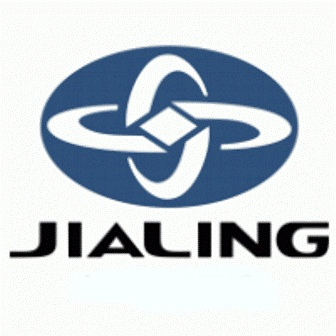
Jialing

== See also ==
- List of motorcycle manufacturers
- Automotive industry in China

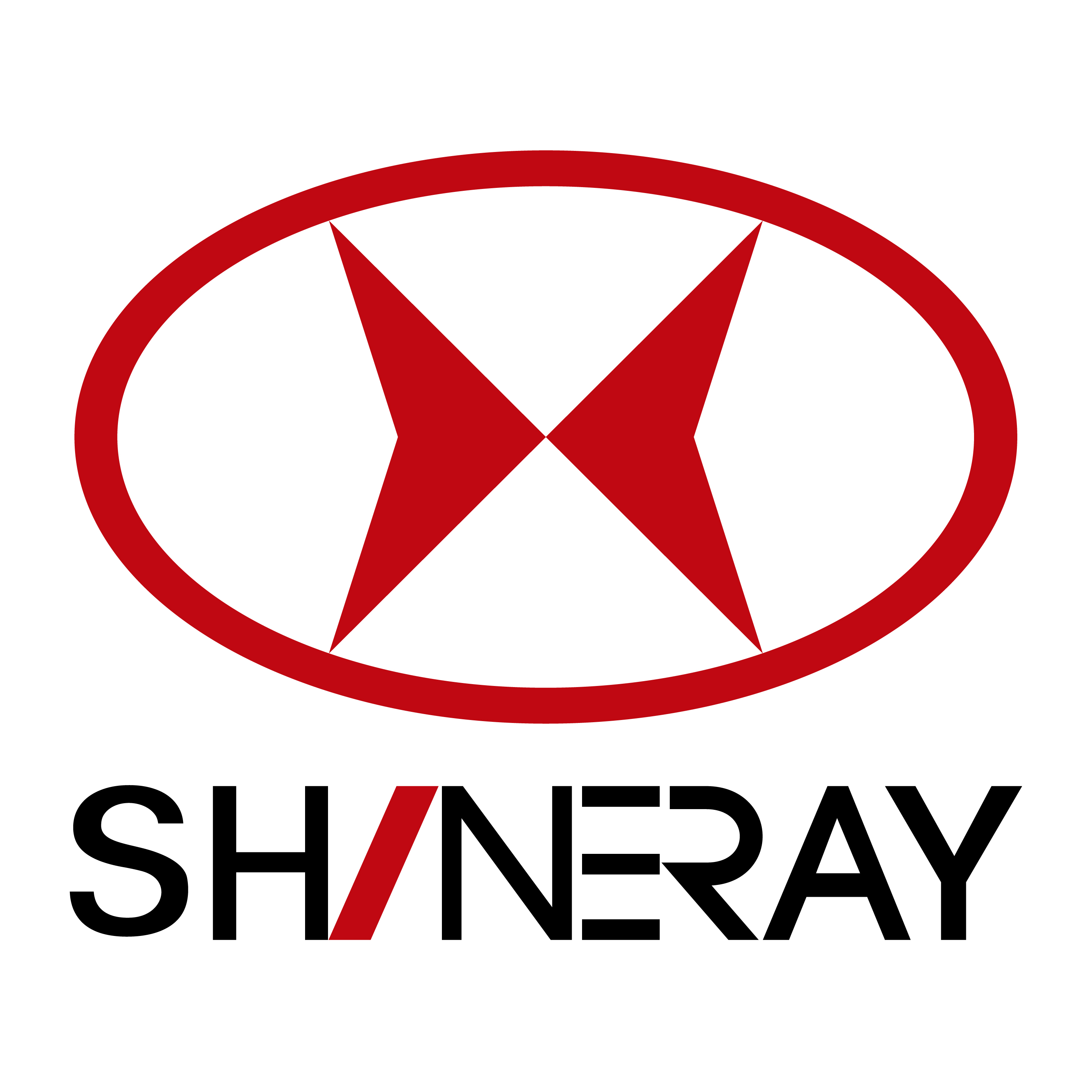
shineray
