= Moto Morini X-Cape =

Adventure bike

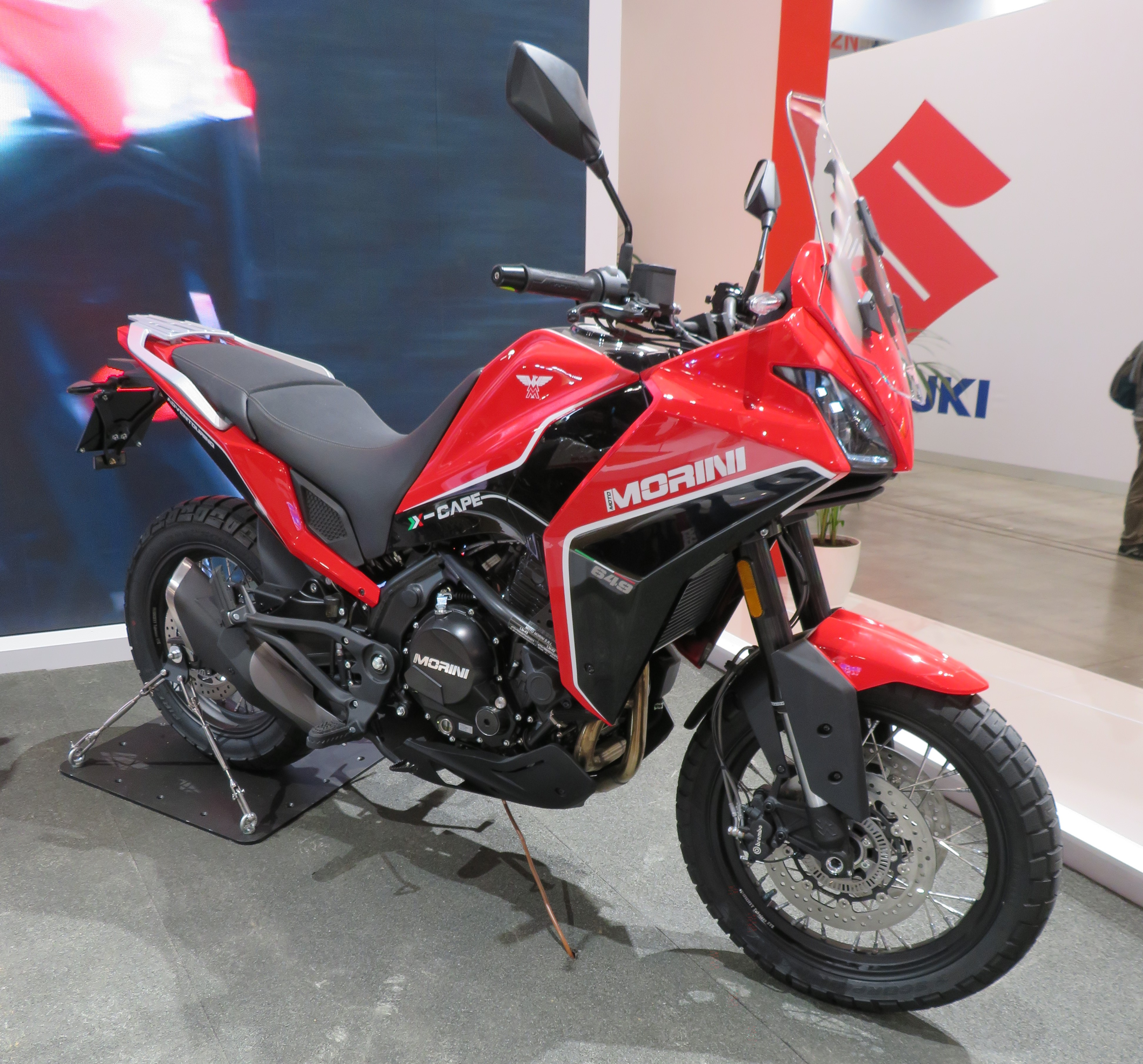
- Manufacturer: Moto Morini
- Production: 2021-present
- Assembly: Taizhou, Zhejiang, China; Trivolzio, Italy (final assembly)
- Class: Dual-sport
- Engine: CFMoto 283MT 649 cc (39.6 cu in) liquid-cooled 4-stroke 8-valve DOHC parallel-twin
- Bore / stroke: 83mm x 60mm
- Compression ratio: 11.3:1
- Top speed: 170 km/h
- Power: 44 kW (59 hp) @ 8,250 rpm
- Torque: 54.00 N⋅m (39.83 lbf⋅ft) @ 7,000 rpm
- Transmission: 6-speed, clutch in oil bath with cable control
- Frame type: Steel
- Suspension: Front: USD Telescopic forks Rear: Monoshock
- Brakes: Front: 298 mm twin discs Rear: 255 mm single disc
- Tires: Front: 110/80-19M/C; Rear: 150/70-17M/C
- Wheelbase: 1,490 mm (59 in)
- Dimensions: L: 2,200 mm (87 in); W: 900 mm (35 in); H: 1,390 mm (55 in)
- Seat height: 820 mm (32 in); 845 mm (33.3 in)
- Weight: 213 kg (470 lb) (dry); 234 kg (516 lb) (wet)
- Fuel capacity: 18 L (4.0 imp gal; 4.8 US gal)

The Moto Morini X-Cape is a midsize adventure/dual-sport motorcycle manufactured by Moto Morini since 2021.

== History ==
Initially presented in prototype form at EICMA in November 2019, it made its final production version debut on the Chinese market at the beginning of June 2021 and was then presented again at EICMA in November 2021.

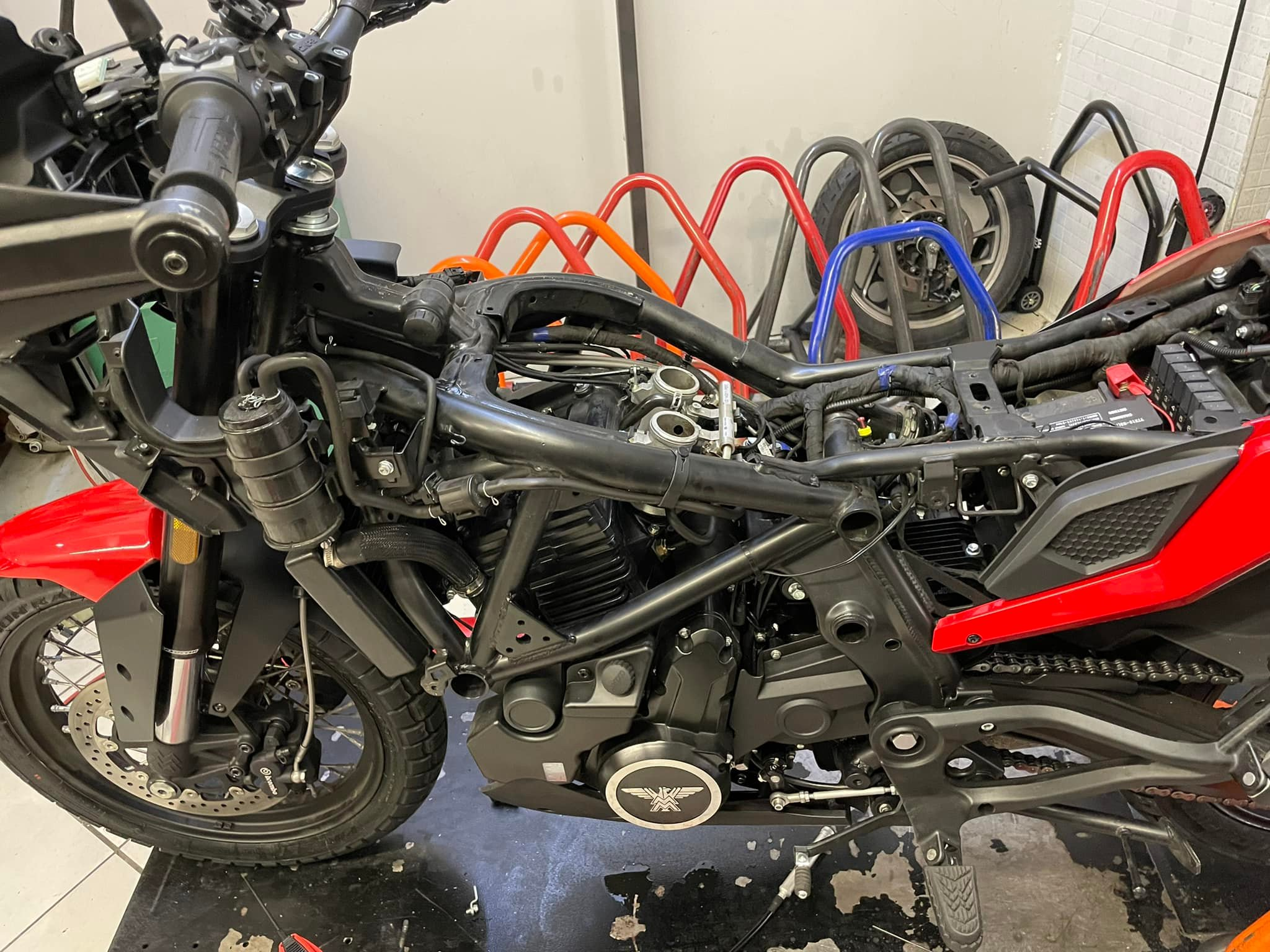
The chassis of X-Cape

The X-Cape 650 was designed at the Moto Morini R&D center based in Trivolzio, Pavia, it is partially manufactured in China by the Zhongneng Vehicle Group with final assembly in Italy at Moto Morini Trivolzio plant.

It is equipped with the 8-valve twin-shaft liquid-cooled two-cylinder CFMoto 283MT engine (based on the old Kawasaki ER-6 lump) powered by a Bosch electronic injection system, placed in a transverse position with a displacement of 649 cm^{3}, which in this version has 60 HP at 8250 rpm and 56 Nm of torque at 7000 rpm. The engine is Euro 5-friendly.

A 48 HP version is also available in Europe falling into the category of A2 novice drivers. The weight is 213 kg dry, 234 in running order (full fuel plus oil). The transmission is entrusted to a six-speed gearbox with chain.

The frame is a classic trellis in perimeter steel tubes, a front trellis to support the head and a reinforcement plate where the swingarm is anchored, equipped with a front suspension with a 50 mm upside-down fork from Marzocchi, while at the rear there is a classic aluminum swingarm anchored to a central KYB shock absorber.

The Brembo braking system consists of a double semi-floating disc with a diameter of 298 mm with two-piston calipers at the front and a single 255 mm disc at the rear, equipped with Bosch ABS. Tubeless tires measuring 110/80-19 M/C at the front and 150/70-17 M/C at the rear are fitted on spoked or alloy rims.

In February 2022 the Gold Wheels edition was introduced.

In November 2022, the X-Cape SC Project was presented at EICMA, which presents the exhaust terminal of the SC Project company. Aesthetically, it has a livery inspired by the rally bikes that race the Dakar. The Rally-S silencer is made of ultra-light titanium and has an outlet diameter of 60 mm, a feature that makes the sound of the parallel twin cylinder even more intense and dark. To make this plug & play product that complies with Euro 5 homologation even more personal, the Moto Morini logo has been laser engraved next to the manufacturer's logo. The X-Cape SC is 1 kg lighter and gains 2 Nm of torque and 1.8 HP of power at 7,200 rpm. This novelty covered by the brand's guarantee will be on sale from December at a price of 525 euros.

== Moto Morini X-Cape ADV-R ==
This special edition introduced at EICMA 2022 is a one off from the racing DNA, in fact the R stands for Racing. In addition to improving the performance of the engine and the chassis, the Moto Morini technicians have modified the superstructures to tackle any type of terrain: the standard saddle has been replaced with a specialized raised one to better control the bike between the legs, while in the below is the sump guard and the SC Project racing exhaust. Like the rally bikes, the windshield protects the Garmin navigation system.
