= Honda Joker =

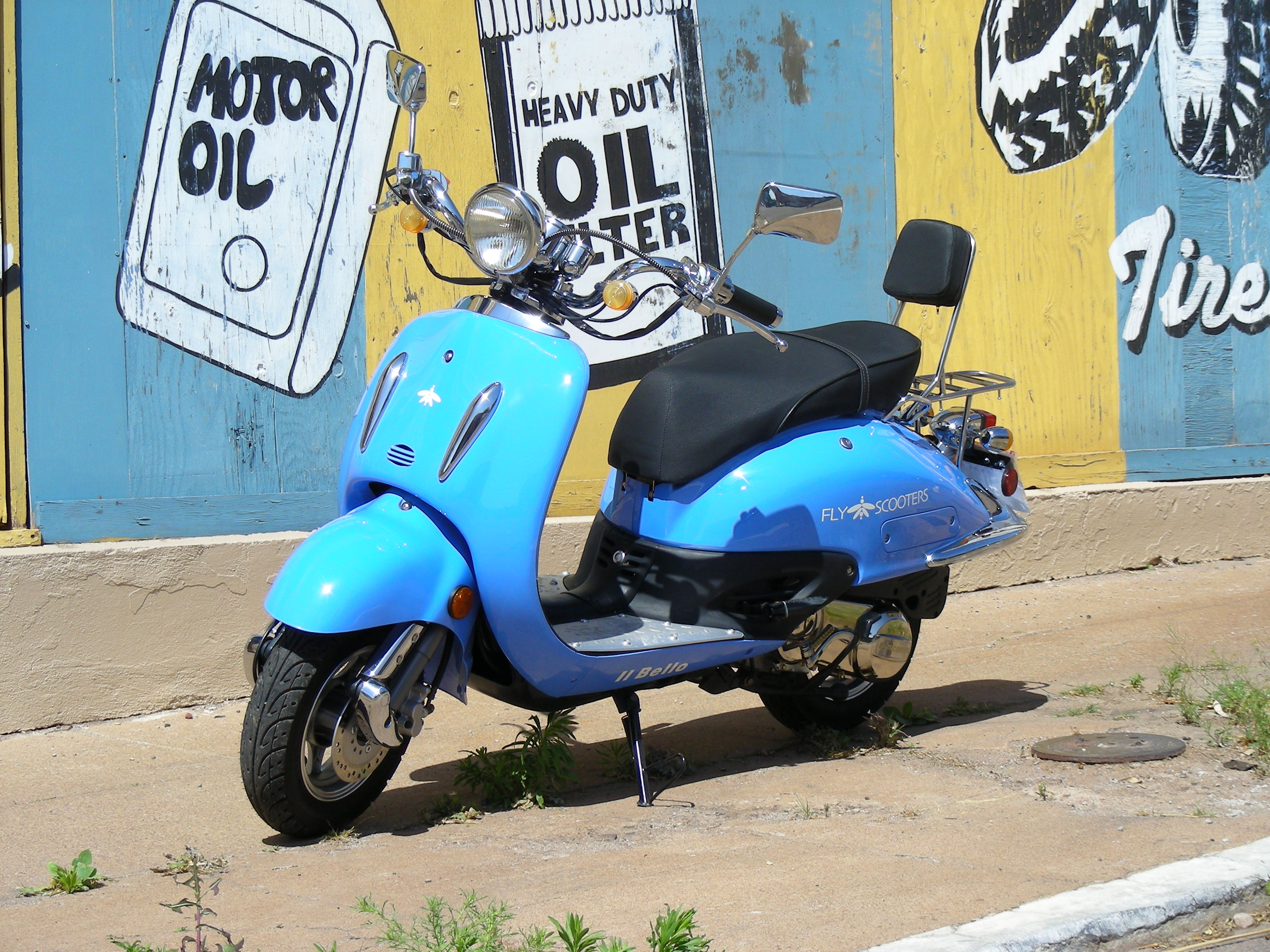
- Manufacturer: Honda
- Also called: Shadow, SRX50, SRX90
- Production: 1996–1999
- Class: Scooter
- Engine: 49cc / 90cc
- Bore / stroke: Air-cooled 2-stroke single

The Joker is a Honda scooter made from 1996 to 1999.

== History ==
The Honda Joker scooter was first launched in 1996 in Japan. Then in Europe and the US, where it was renamed the Honda SRX50/90 Shadow, which came in two versions respectively which had a 49cc or a 90cc two-stroke engine.

== Concept ==
The design concept was based on being used for basic transportation, and the Custom-motorcycles of the US.

== See also ==
- Znen C Artemis
- Aprilia mojito
- Flyscooters Il Bello
