= Aprilia Mojito =

Mojito / Habana
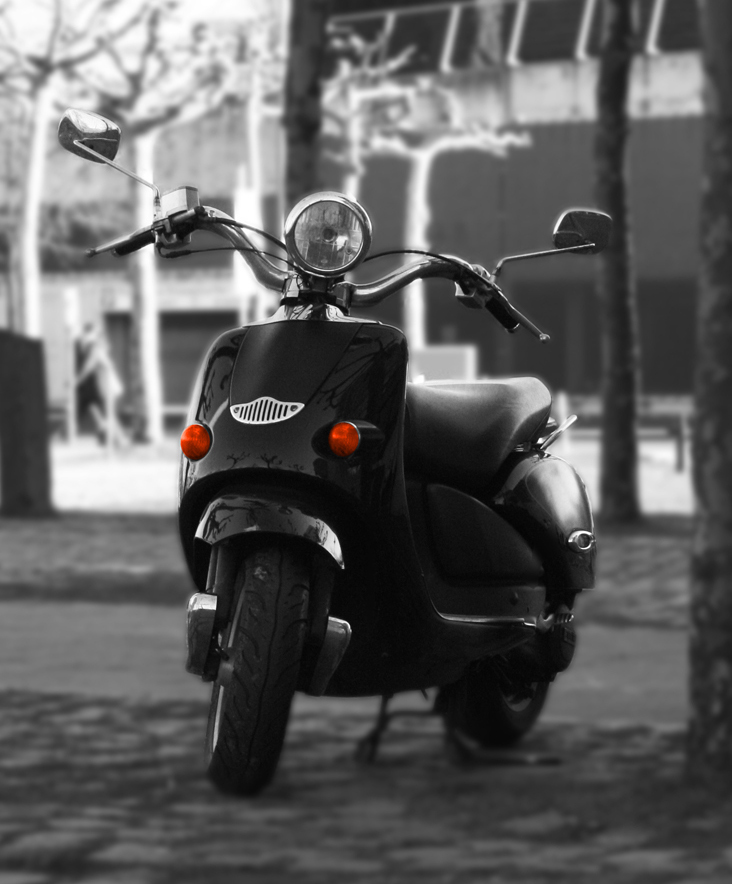
- Manufacturer: Aprilia
- Parent company: Piaggio
- Production: 1999–2012
- Class: Scooter
- Engine: 49 cc (3.0 cu in) two-stroke / 125 cc (7.6 cu in) or 150 cc (9.2 cu in) four-stroke single-cylinder

The Aprilia Mojito (marketed as the Habana in some regions) is a scooter manufactured by Aprilia starting in 1999. Its retro styling bears a strong resemblance to the earlier Honda Joker.

== See also ==
- Honda Joker
