= Flyscooters =

American motor scooter company

- 2008 Il Bello
- Type: Private corporation
- Industry: Powersports
- Founded: 2006
- Defunct: 2010
- Headquarters: Oakland, California, United States
- Key people: Leon Li, Daniel Pak
- Products: Scooters
- Website: flyscooters.com

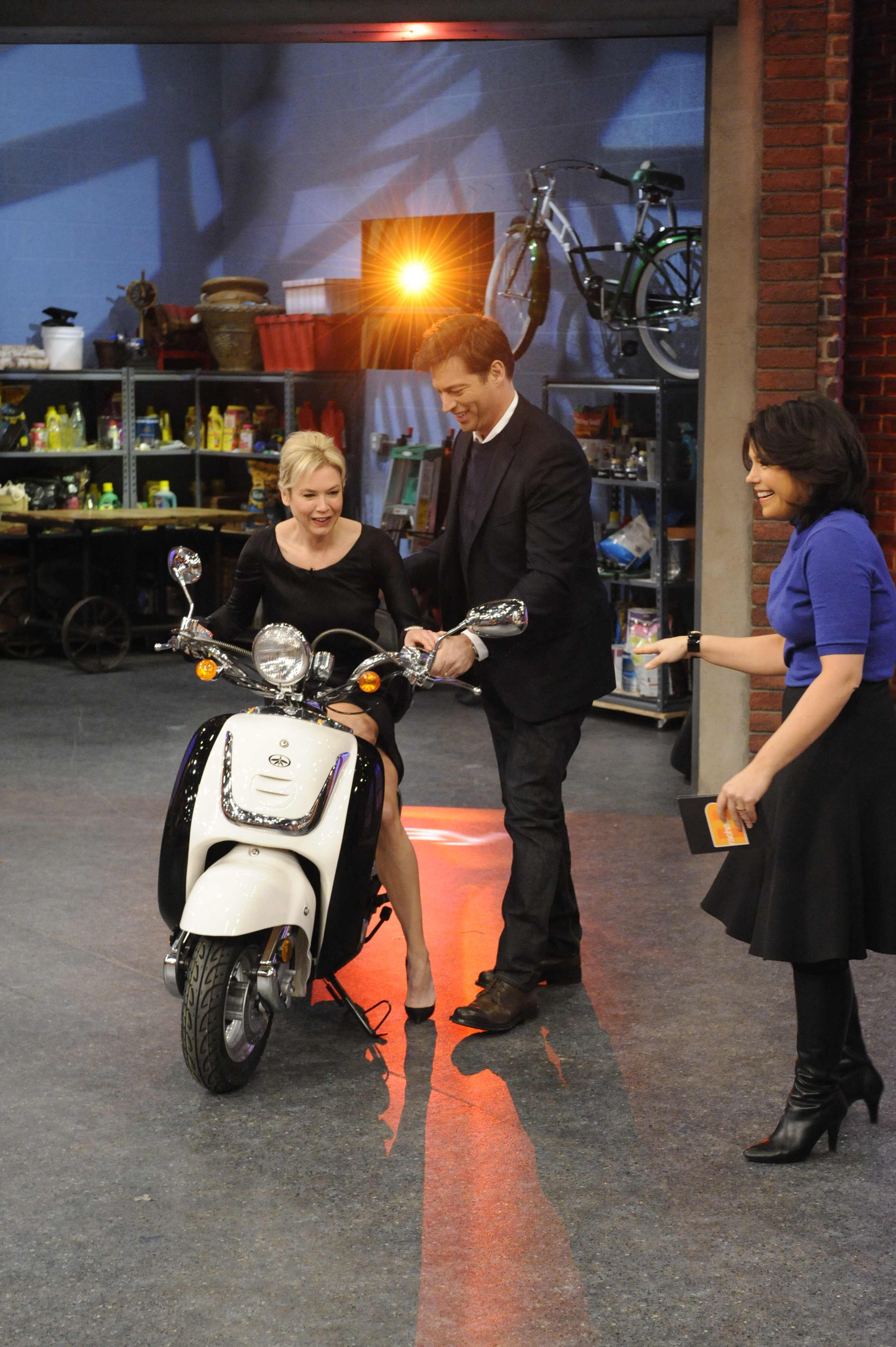
Rachel Ray Show with Renee Zellweger and Harry Connick Jr.

Flyscooters was an American company that marketed gas-powered motor scooters manufactured in China and Taiwan. The company was founded in 2006 in Florida by scooter enthusiasts Leon Li and Daniel Pak, and ceased operations in 2010. During the operating life of the company, Flyscooters' basic business model was to import low-cost scooters from abroad (mostly the Chinese firm Zhongneng Industry Group (Znen)) and distribute them under the Flybrand name to a network of retail scooter dealerships across the United States, providing dealers with warranty and spare parts support.

Flyscooters' main marketing focus was the Internet, although the company attended industry events and trade shows and promoted their brand through other PR initiatives .

== Models ==
=== Scooters ===
- El Capitan 250
- X808 150
- Seba 150
- Swift 150
- Cadenza 150 cc
- Il Bello 50 & 150 cc
- La Vie 150 cc
- Swift 50 cc
- Rio 50cc & 150cc
- Trek 50cc & 150cc
- Pico 50cc
- E-250 250cc
- Fly Scout 110cc

==== Il Bello ====
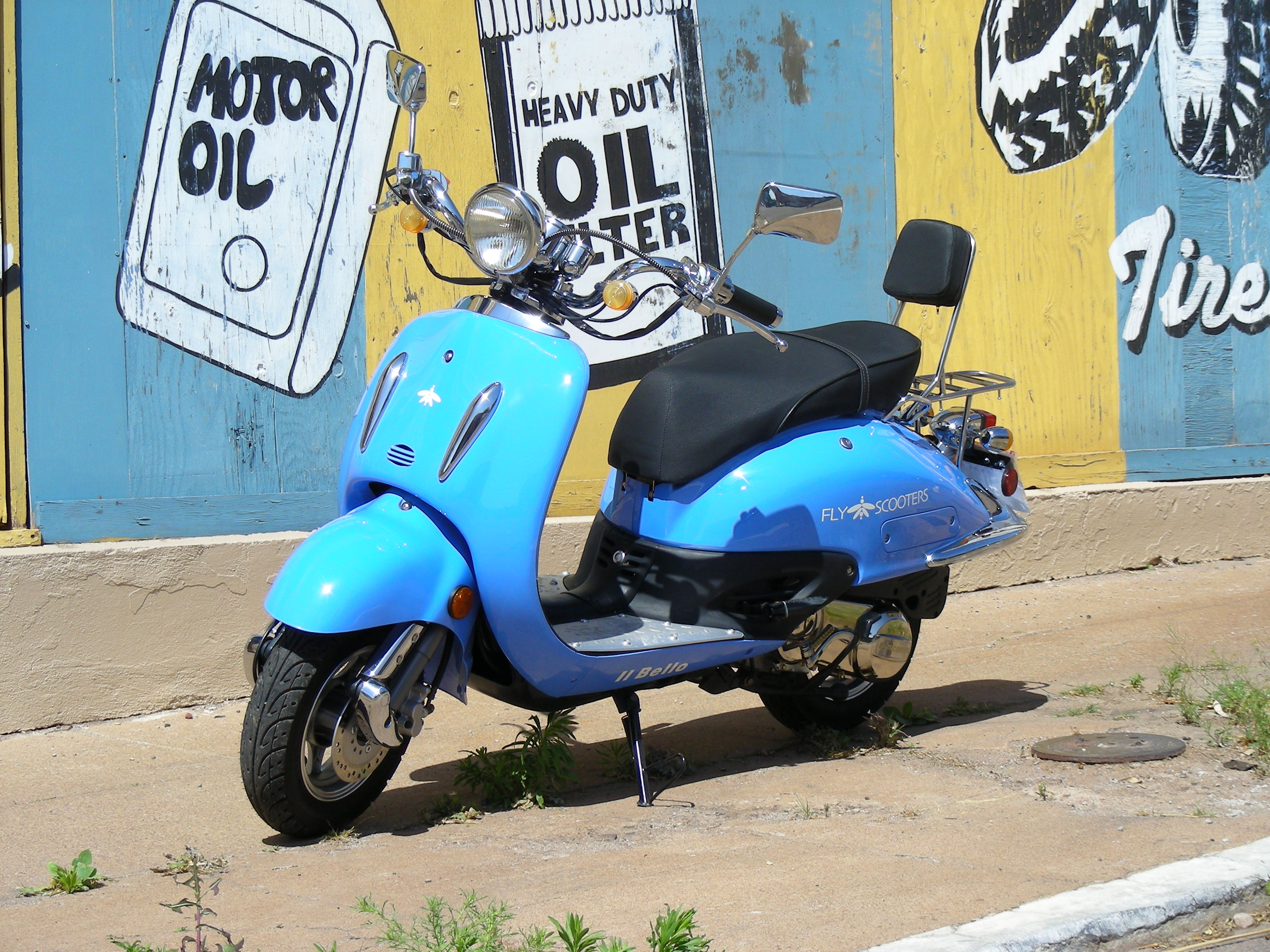
Flyscooter Il Bello 2006 has a classic-vintage look

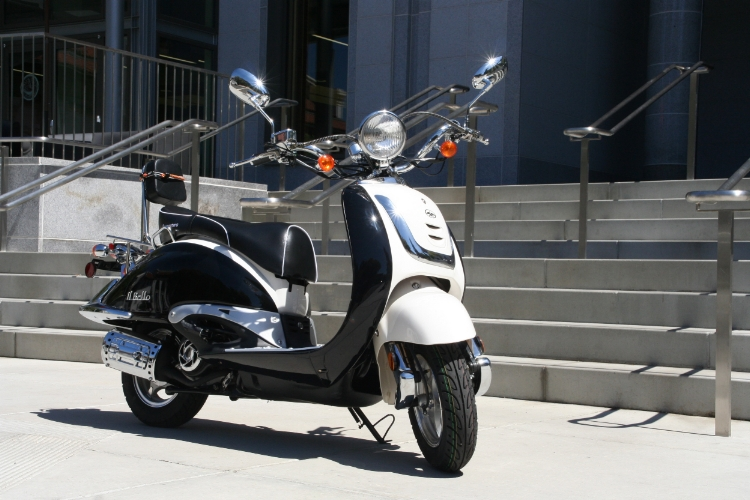
Flyscooter Il Bello, 2008

The Il Bello is a street legal, gasoline-powered motor scooter assembled in China using parts sourced from China, Il Bello is an unlicensed copy of the Honda Joker and is the flagship vehicle of Flyscooters. The Il Bello has a 4-stroke air-cooled motor and gets 70-90 mpg. It is certified by the California Air Resources Board (CARB) and the United States Department of Transportation (DOT). It comes in 50cc and 150cc. Sometimes the Il Bello is erroneously called Il Bella. The Il Bello is assembled in China at Taizhou Zhongneng Motorcycle Co. Ltd, also known in the industry as ZNEN.

50 cc specification:

- Engine: Single Cylinder, 4-stroke
- Displacement: 50cc
- Fuel Consumption: 88 mpg
- Top Speed: 37 mph
- Cooling System: Forced Air
- Compression Ratio: 10.5 to 1
- Maximum Power: 2.7 hp @ 8000 rpm
- Maximum Torque 1.6 ft lb @ 6000 rpm
- Fuel System: carbureted
- Drive System: CVT (fully automated)
- Load Capacity: 230 lbs
- Starting System: electric and kick start
- Front tire: 3.5 – 10 inch
- Rear tire: 3.5 – 10 inch
- Front Suspension: dual telescopic
- Rear Suspension: single non-adjustable shock
- Front brake: performance disc
- Rear brake: drum
- Dry Weight: 213 lbs
- Wheelbase: 47.8 inches
- Ground Clearance: 3.9 inches
- Seat Height: 27.2 inches
- Overall Length: 74.1 inches
- Fuel Capacity: 1.43 gallon
- Battery: 12 volt
- Transmission Belts: Gates, United States
- Spark Plugs: NGK, Japan
- Bearings: NSK, Japan
- Piston Rings: ATG, Taiwan
- Gasoline: 91 octane
- Tires: Chengshin, Taiwan or Duro Huafeng, Taiwan
- Battery: YUASA
- Headlight: Philips
- Carburetor: Deni (joint venture of KEIHIN, Japan) used in Harley Davidson, Honda and other major brands of motorcycles.

150 cc specifications:

- Engine: Single Cylinder, 4-stroke
- Displacement: 150cc
- Fuel Consumption: 79mpg
- Top Speed: 50 mph
- Cooling System: Forced Air
- Compression Ratio: 9.2 to 1
- Maximum Power: 8.4 hp @ 7000 rpm
- Maximum Torque 5.0 ft lb @ 6000 rpm
- Fuel System: Carbureted
- Drive System: CVT (fully automated)
- Load Capacity: 310 lbs
- Starting System: electric and kick start
- Front tire: 3.5 – 10 inch
- Rear tire: 3.5 – 10 inch
- Front Suspension: dual telescopic
- Rear Suspension: single non-adjustable shock
- Front brake: performance disc
- Rear brake: drum
- Dry Weight: 223 lbs
- Wheelbase: 47.8 inches
- Ground Clearance: 3.9 inches
- Seat Height: 27.2 inches
- Overall Length: 74.1 inches
- Fuel Capacity: 1.3 gallon
- Battery: 12 volt
- Transmission Belts: Gates, United States
- Spark Plugs: NGK, Japan
- Bearings: NSK, Japan
- Piston Rings: ATG, Taiwan
- Gasoline: 91 octane
- Tires: Chengshin, Taiwan or Duro Huafeng, Taiwan
- Battery: YUASA
- Headlight: Philips
- Carburetor: Deni (joint venture of KEIHIN, Japan) used in Harley Davidson, Honda and other major brands of motorcycles.

==== La Vie ====
La Vie is a street legal, gas-powered motor scooter assembled in China using parts sourced from China, Japan, Taiwan, and the United States. The La Vie has 4-stroke air-cooled motor and gets 95-100 mpg. It is certified by the California Air Resources Board (CARB) and the United States Department of Transportation (DOT).

La Vie is assembled in China and only available from brick and mortar dealers; it cannot be purchased online or drop shipped. The strict maintenance and care from dealers mandated by Flyscooters is argued as restricting because alterations to the La Vie may void warranty.

La Vie comes in Sea Mist Green, Montego Red, Royal Purple and Cinnamon Brown. It is no longer available in Peruvian Gold. La Vie has locking under seat storage, pop-out passenger foot pegs, both a side and center stand, and a locking forward compartment. It is made from scratch and dig resistant ABS material rather than fiberglass or metal. Deploying the side stand does not kill the engine which is the norm, and starting the motor cannot be accomplished until applying one of the brakes.

The demographic breakdown of La Vie riders is roughly half riders trying to go green and be eco-friendly while the other half is made up of senior citizens.

La Vie riders are active on forums, participate in community rallies, and form clubs dedicated to Flyscooters, like Scooter Squadron. Flyscooters is known for strong dealer support, dedication to customer service and encourages good will and philanthropy that range from teaming with Avon, Massachusetts fire fighters to raise money for a relief fund, to donations to Marlborough School where the La Vie was photographed with actress Jamie Lee Curtis.

Specifications:

- Engine: Single Cylinder, 4-stroke
- Displacement: 151cc
- Fuel Consumption: 74mpg
- Top Speed: 55 mph
- Cooling System: Forced Air
- Compression Ratio: 9.2 to 1
- Maximum Power: 8.4 hp @ 7000 rpm
- Maximum Torque 5.0 ft lb @ 6000 rpm
- Fuel System: Carbureted
- Drive System: CVT (fully automated)
- Load Capacity: 330 lbs
- Starting System: electric and kick start
- Front tire: Tubeless 120/70-12"
- Rear tire: Tubeless 120/70-12"
- Front Suspension: dual hydraulic shock absorbers
- Rear Suspension: pre-loaded adjustable hydraulic shock absorber
- Front brake: hydraulically operated performance disc
- Rear brake: hydraulically operated performance disc
- Dry Weight: 242 lbs (110 kg)
- Wheelbase: 54.8 inches
- Seat Height: 33.0 inches
- Fuel Capacity: 1.3 gallon
- Battery: 12 volt
- Transmission Belts: Gates, US
- Spark Plugs: NGK, Japan
- Bearings: NSK, Japan
- Piston Rings: ATG, Taiwan
- Gasoline: 91 octane
- Tires: Chengshin, Taiwan or Duro Huafeng, Taiwan
- Battery: YUASA
- Headlight: Philips
- Carburetor: Deni (joint venture of KEIHIN, Japan) used in Harley Davidson, Honda and other major brands of motorcycles.

=== Accessory ===
- Scooter Bug trailer

== Bibliography ==
- Li, Leon, "Flyscooters Signs With CPI (press release)", Dealer News
- Asia Media, Journal of Culture and Commerce, vol. 2, no. 5, March 7, 2008
- Just Gotta Scoot, May 2008
- Rachel Ray Show
- Discovery Science Channel, Scooter Shooter Episode July 2009
- Patriot Ledger newspaper
- Avon Local paper
- International Scooterists BBS
- ScootDawg Scooter Forum
- Asia Media, Journal of Culture and Commerce, March 7, 2008. Vol. II, Issue V
- Just Gotta Scoot, May 2008
