= Znen =

Zhongneng Vehicle Group (ZNEN)
- Type: Private company
- Industry: Motorcycle manufacturing
- Founded: 1988; 38 years ago
- Founder: Chen Huaneng
- Headquarters: Taizhou, Zhejiang, China
- Area served: Worldwide
- Products: Motorcycles; Scooters
- Brands: ZNEN Motor
- Subsidiaries: Moto Morini; Fosti Motorcycle
- Website: https://www.znen.com/

Zhongneng Vehicle Group (usually known as ZNEN Group) is a Chinese motorcycle manufacturer founded by Chen Huaneng in June 1988, in Taizhou, Zhejiang. It was not until 1996 that ZNEN manufactured its first petrol mopeds. After twenty years in the motor vehicle industry, Zhongneng Industry Group develops three main products: petrol mopeds, electric mopeds, and motorcycles.

== History ==
In 1988, Chen Huaneng founded the Donghai Machinery Factory in Taizhou (Zhejiang), a manufacturer of components for refrigerators and small household appliances that quickly became popular on the local market. The numerous orders led the company to grow and in 1996 Taizhou Zhongneng Photoelectric was established, specializing in the production of photoelectric material for household appliances. Shortly thereafter, the production of electric bicycles began. The economic boom of the motorcycle sector, and the success in the field of bicycles pushed the company to design compact motorcycles for the local market and in 1998 the company name was changed to Zhejiang Zhongneng Photoelectric, the export of lamps and electrical equipment to Asian countries and Eastern Europe, the ZNEN Motor brand was founded with the presentation of the first scooter, the fifty "S-King" which will go into production the following year thanks to the use of technologies and patents under a license of Japanese origin.

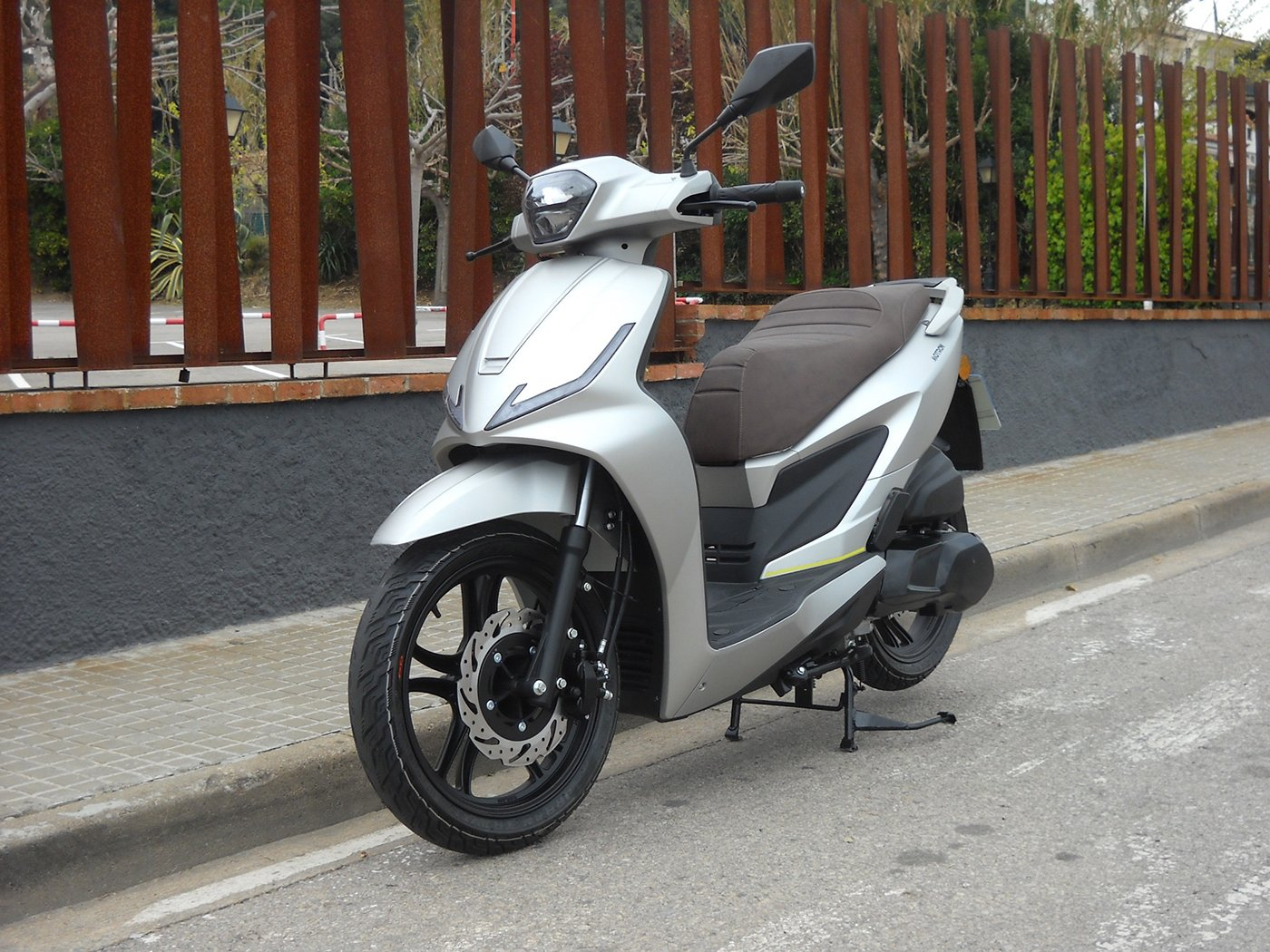
The ZNEN Coral 125 scooter

In 2002, the new 42,000 m^{2} (450,000 sq ft) production plant in Xiaoxie for light motorcycles was inaugurated and the company name was changed to Zhejiang Zhongneng Motorcycle Co., Ltd.

In 2003, Taizhou Zhongneng Automobile was founded, specializing in the production of plastic components for automobiles, and Taizhou Zhongneng Motorcycle for components intended for motorcycles.

In 2005, Foshan Fosti Motorcycle Manufacturing was founded, destined to produce light motorcycles in the 50-250 cc range and the first scooter units were exported to Europe. The following year the "ZNEN Zoom" scooter was presented, the first vehicle developed independently by the company. Other scooter models--such as the F8, the Kangaroo, and the Roar--will then be put into production.

To meet the growing production of scooters, the new 86,000 m^{2} (930,000 sq ft) Zhongneng Xinqiao factory was inaugurated in 2009. In 2013 Moden Electric Vehicle Technology Co., Ltd was founded, a subsidiary dedicated to the development and production of electric motorcycles. In 2017, the new 230,000 m^{2} (2,500,000 sq ft) Taizhou Bay Agglomeration factory opened.

In October 2018, Zhongneng Vehicle Group acquired the Italian motorcycle manufacturer Moto Morini for 10 million euros, pledging to maintain production and plants in Italy.

== Legal issues ==
In 2010, the Zhongneng Group registered projects with drawings of the models ZNEN Ves, Cityzen and Revival models at the EUIPO (European Intellectual Property Office).

In 2014, Piaggio made its first citation to the EUIPO with an application for "declaration of nullity", declaring that the three Chinese models do not meet the "requirements of novelty and individual character" compared to the current Piaggio Vespa LX and compared to the various patents filed by Piaggio for Vespa models since 1945.

In 2015, and in 2018, after another appeal, EUIPO again rejected Piaggio's request, which turned to the European Court.

In 2018, the Turin Court of Appeal confirmed the first instance ruling: the Vespa cannot be copied and the ZNEN models cannot be sold in Italy.

On 17 February 2021, ZNEN presents appeal.

== Brands and models ==
- Fosti Motorcycle – motorcycles, and recreational ATVs (quads)
- Moto Morini – sports motorcycles designed in Trivolzio, Italy.
- Moden Electric Vehicle Technology – electric scooters
- ZNEN Motor – motorcycles, scooters, mopeds and recreational ATVs (quads)
- Motowin - scooters
- Franco Morini - official name: Zhejiang Franco Morini New Energy Co., Ltd., sold electric scooters

== Znen C Artemis ==
Znen C Artemis
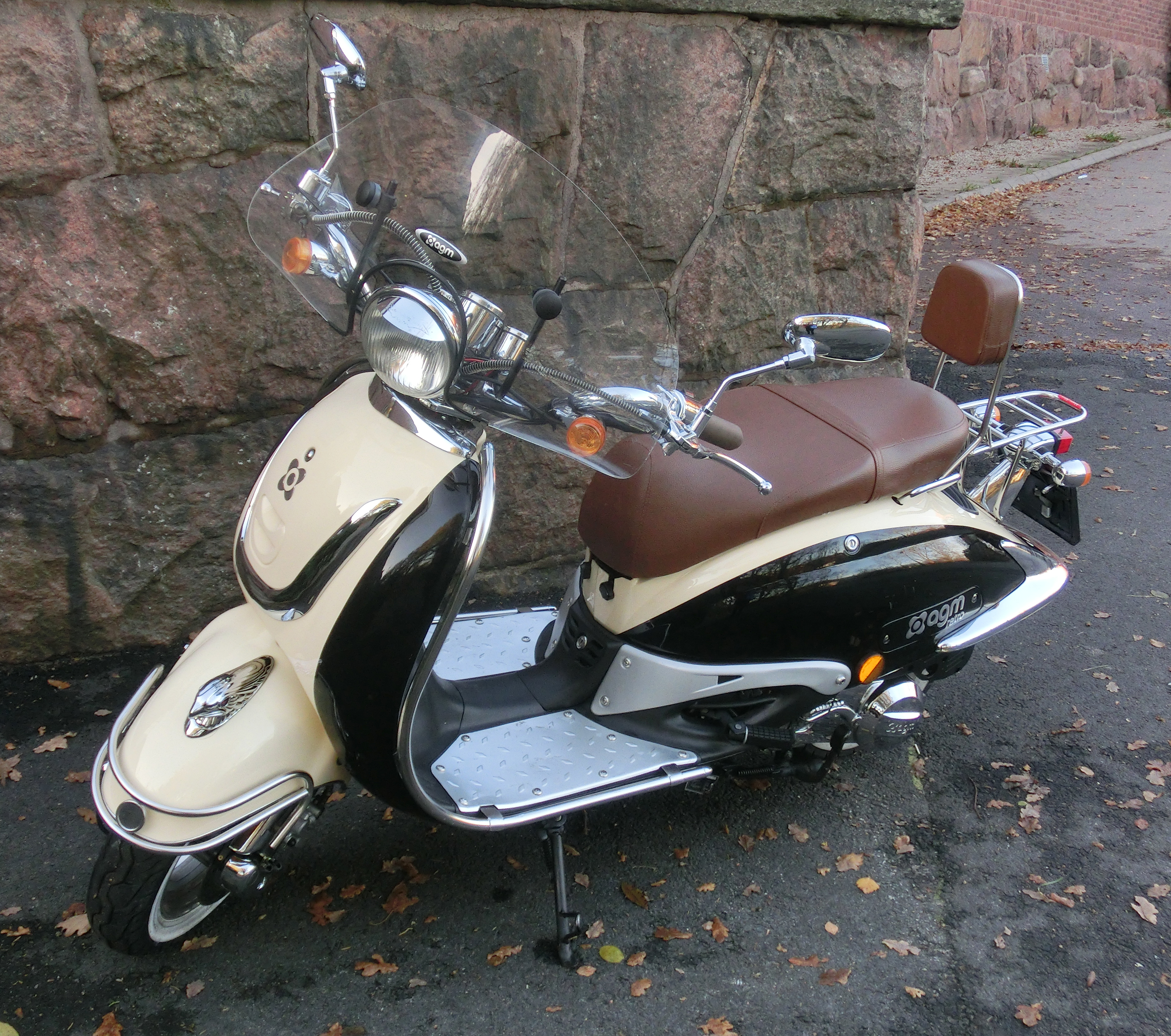
- Manufacturer: Znen (also known as ZN-Motors)
- Also called: Lexmoto Tommy (UK); Tamoretti retro scooter (UK, Netherlands); Jinlun JL125T-10 Retro (UK and worldwide); Dorton Sunny (Spain); Paparazzi's (USA); Flyscooters Il Bello (USA); Lance Vintage (USA); BMS Heritage (USA); Big Boy Revival (South Africa); Asya Nostalji (Turkey); Mondial 125ZN (Turkey); Mondial 125ZNU (Turkey)
- Production: 2006 - present
- Successor: Znen C Artemis 2, Znen Aurora
- Class: Scooter/Motorcycle
- Engine: GY6-B type, 4-stroke; Single Cylinder, Fan-cooled, 2 valve, SOHC 50cc(BN139QMI), 125cc(BN152QMI), 150cc (BN157QMI)
- Bore / stroke: 52.4mm x 57.8mm (for 125cc)
- Compression ratio: 9.2:1 (for 125cc)
- Top speed: 90 km/h (claimed)
- Power: 6.3 Kw - 8.45 HP at 7500 rpm (for 125cc)
- Torque: 9.3 N.m at 5000 rpm (for 125cc)
- Ignition type: Capacitor discharge ignition
- Transmission: Automatic continuously variable transmission
- Frame type: Steel tube
- Suspension: double front, single back
- Brakes: 240mm disc brake on front wheel, 130mm drum brake on rear
- Tires: front 3.5-10, rear 3.5-10
- Wheelbase: 1255 mm
- Dimensions: L: 1891 mm W: 872 mm H: 1090 mm
- Weight: 93 kg (dry)
- Fuel capacity: 4.8 litres
- Oil capacity: 800-900 mL
- Fuel consumption: 100.89 MPG - 2.8 L/100 km (claimed)
- Related: Honda Joker

The Znen C Artemis is a four-stroke twist-and-go scooter from Znen Motors, which comes in either 50cc (model number ZN50QT-E), 125cc (model number ZN125T-E) or 150cc models (model number ZN150T-E). This scooter is made in Zhejiang, China by Znen Motors and shipped abroad where it is rebadged in various countries. It has European EEC and American EPA and DOT certifications. The design is very similar to the much older Honda Joker.

== See also ==
- Flyscooters
- Moto Morini
