= Rodolfo Frascoli =

Italian motorcycle designer

Rodolfo Frascoli is an Italian motorcycle designer.

== Career ==
Rodolfo Frascoli is an Italian motorcycle designer, he is the founder of Frascoli Design, an independent design consultancy that collaborates with prestigious motorcycle brands worldwide. From 1997 to 2010 he held the position of Design Director at Marabese Design. In 2010 he founded Frascoli Design. His designs included among others: Moto Guzzi Griso, Breva, Norge, Gilera, Moto Morini, Aprilia, Honda RSmoto CRF 450, Mondial, many of the recent Triumph Motorcycle VR46 MYA and Suzuki Katana.
