= Moto Morini =

Italian motorcycle manufacturer

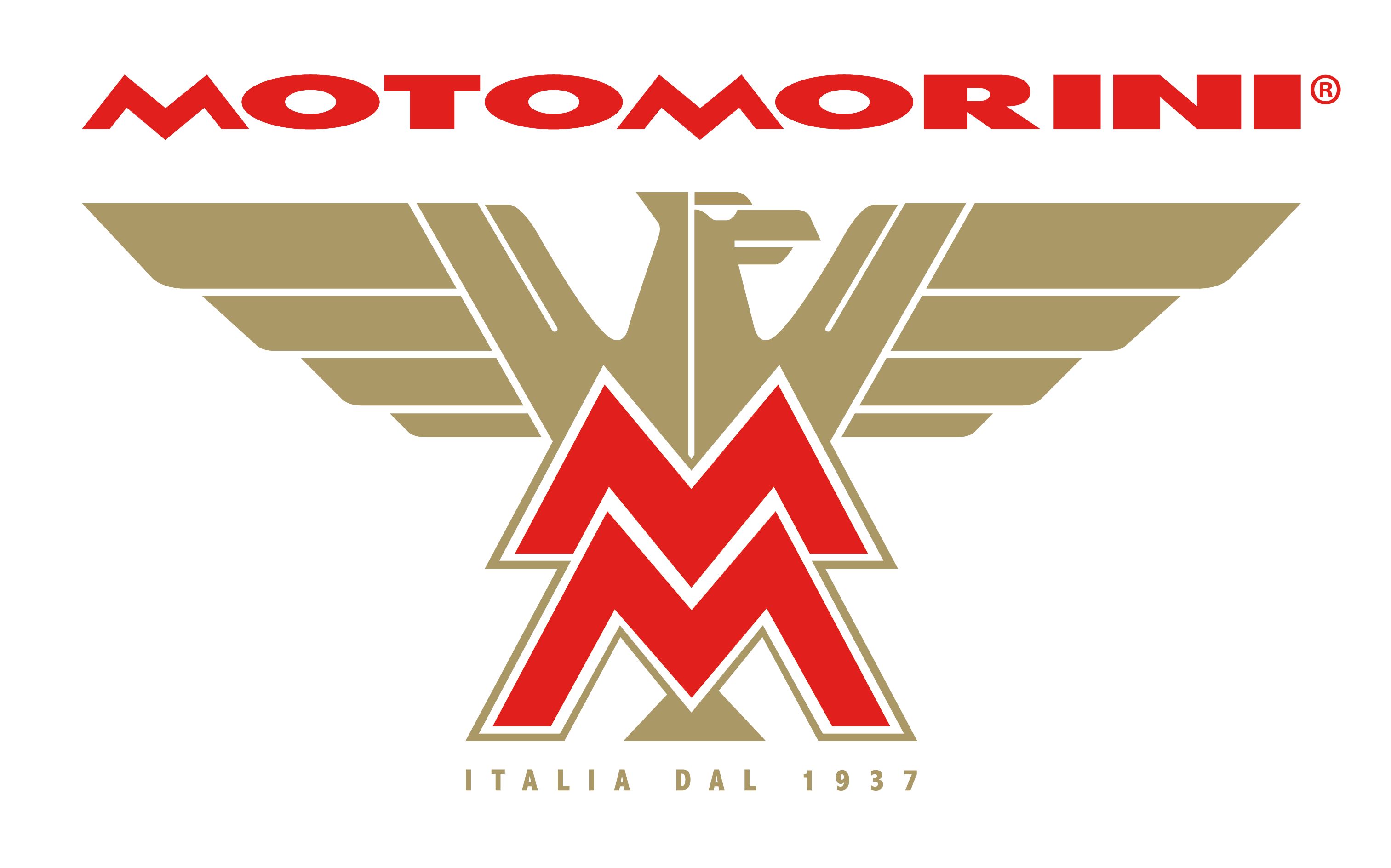
- Industry: Motorcycle manufacturing
- Founded: 1937; 89 years ago in Bologna
- Founder: Alfonso Morini
- Headquarters: Milan, Italy
- Area served: Worldwide
- Products: Motorcycles
- Parent: Zhongneng Vehicle Group
- Website: motomorini.eu

Moto Morini is an Italian motorcycle manufacturer founded by Alfonso Morini in Bologna, in 1937.

Earlier, Morini had also manufactured motorcycles together with Mario Mazzetti under the name MM. Moto Morini came under Cagiva control in 1987, then in 1996 joined Texas Pacific Group, which had also bought Ducati, and in April 1999, the rights to the name were purchased by Morini Franco Motori spa, a company which had been founded by Morini's nephew in 1954. After building large v-twin motorcycles early in the 21st century the company went into liquidation in late 2010. Moto Morini restarted motorcycle production in 2012.

== History ==
Alfonso Morini was born on 22 January 1898. Before he was 16 he was repairing motorcycles, and at the age of sixteen, opened a workshop. This was just before World War I broke out. During the war he was with the 8th Motorcycles Unit, stationed at Padua.

=== MM ===
In 1925 Mauro Mazzetti, impressed by Alfonso's work, asked him to build a single-cylinder 120 cc two-stroke racing bike, making Alfonso the designer, constructor, and racer. They were successful racing, under the MM name, and Alfonso's finest racing moment came in 1927 when his MM 125 took six world records at Monza, during the Grand Prix of Nations. (These records were not bettered for twenty years.) In 1933 he set a new world speed record for 175 cc motorcycles of 162 km/h.

=== Moto Morini three wheelers ===
In 1937 Alfonso and Mauro parted ways, and Alfonso Morini went into the production of 350 cc and 500 cc three wheelers, under the Moto Morini name. The government regulations favoured these lighter fuel efficient machines, and the successful Moto Morini M610 had advanced features, like cardan driveshafts.

This was interrupted by World War II, and Moto Morini was converted to produce aeronautical components. In 1943 the factory was bombed.

=== Motorcycles ===
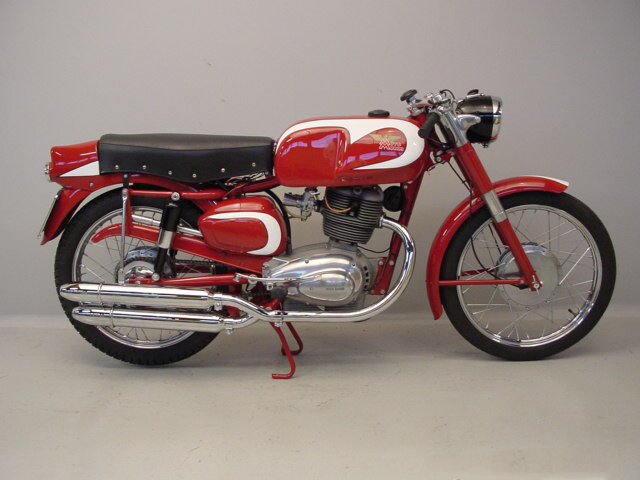
Moto Morini 175 Tresette Sprint

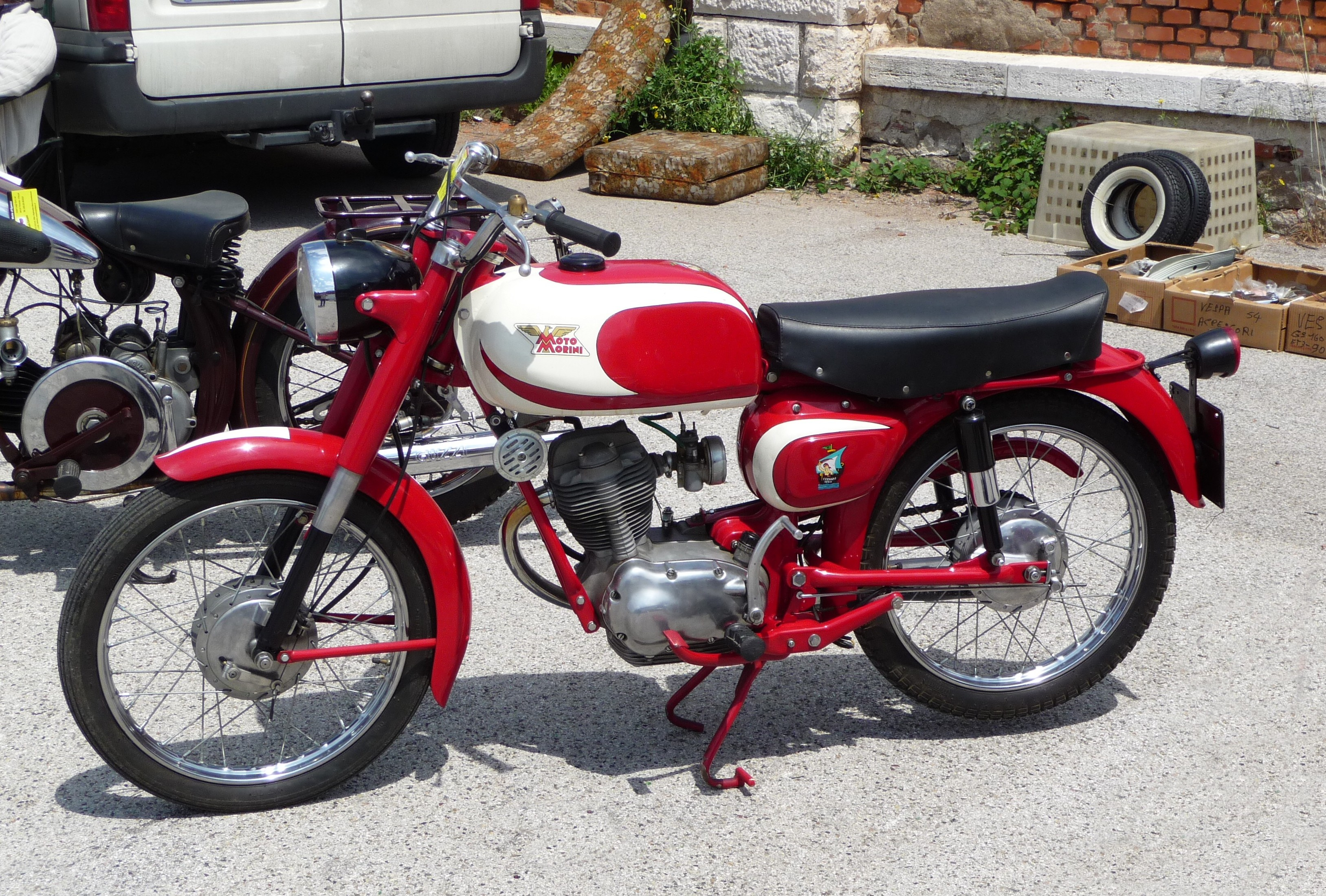
Moto Morini Corsaro 125 of 1960

Undeterred, in 1946, a new three-speed transmission, single cylinder, two-stroke T125 emerged from the new Bologna factory, Via Berti. In 1947 a Sport version appeared. In 1953 a 175 cc pushrod OHV four-stroke model appeared in production. Models like Gran Turismo, Settebello, Rebello, Supersport, Briscola, Tresette, and Tresette Sprint also appeared. In 1956 Moto Morini moved to a larger production facility at Via Bergami. In 1958 Alfonso Morini, Dante Lambertini, and Nerio Biavati designed the 250 GP Double Camshaft.

On 30 June 1969 Alfonso Morini died. He was 71. His daughter, Gabriella Morini, took over management, and would remain in control until 1986. In 1970 Franco Lambertini (unrelated to the earlier Dante Lambertini of Morini's technical staff) left Ferrari works and joined Moto Morini.

== Competition history ==
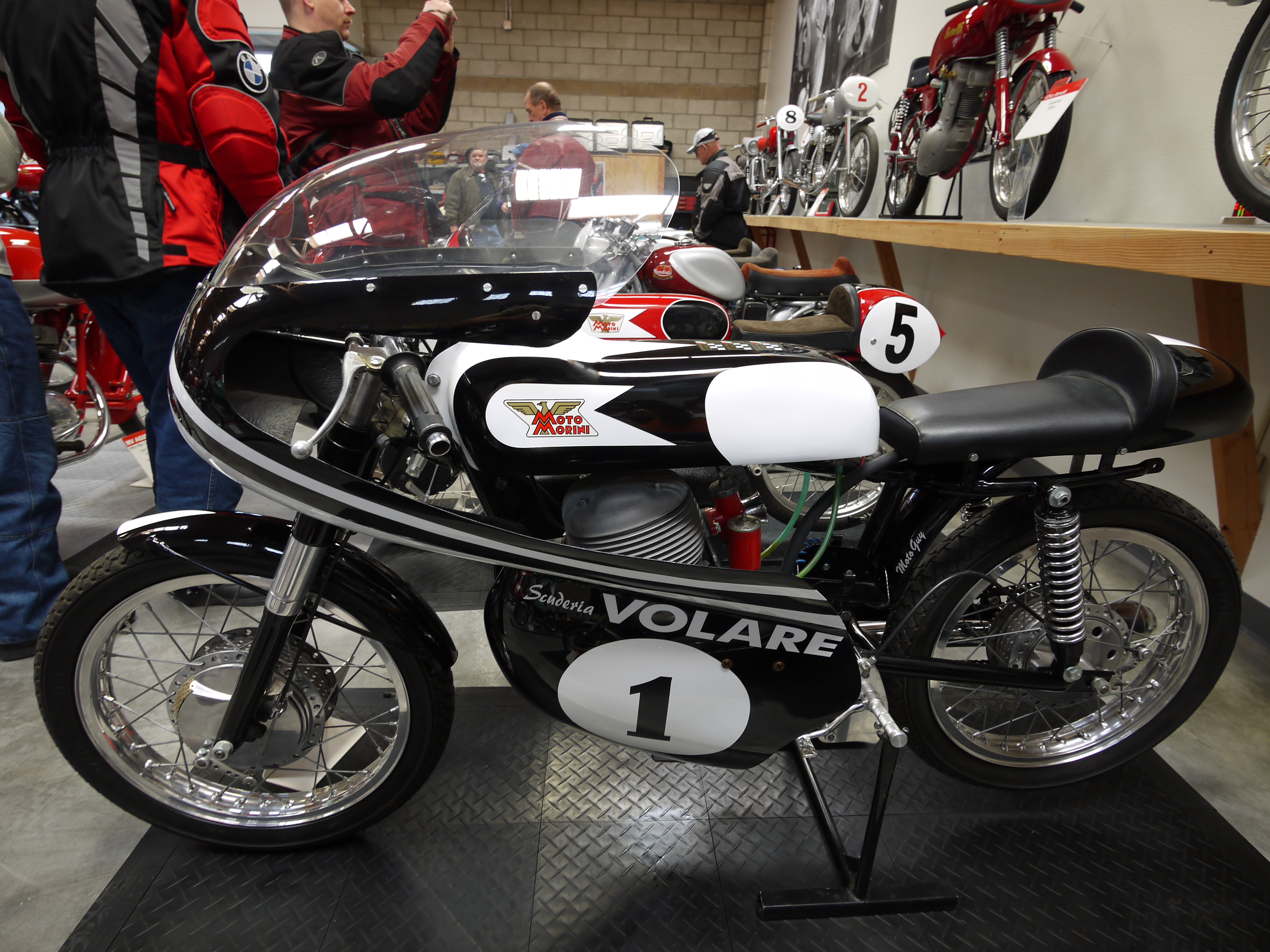
Moto Morini 175 Sprint F3 Corsa, 1959

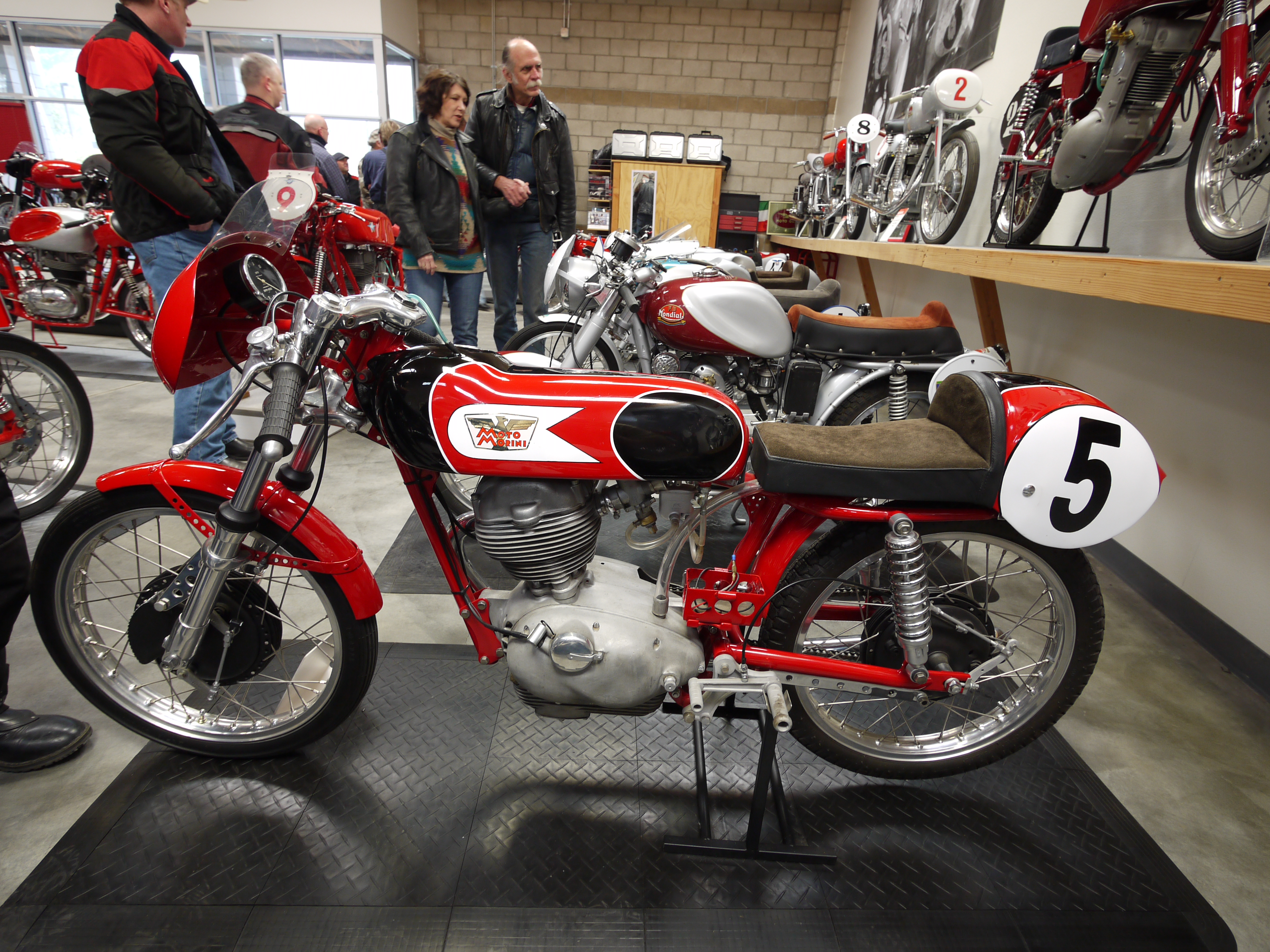
Moto Morini 175 Settebello “Short Rods”, 1961

In 1948, Raffaele Alberti won the Italian Championship for Lightweight Motorcycles on a two-stroke 125 Competition. Umberto Masetti won the Italian Championship for Lightweight Motorcycles in 1949, on a 125 SOHC four-stroke that produced 12 hp (8.9 kW) @ 10000 rpm, and could exceed 140 km/h (87 mph). In 1952 Moto Morini won races outside of Italy with the 125 SOHC four-stroke, as Emilio Mendogni won both the Nations Grand Prix, and the Spanish Grand Prix. The 250 GP put out 38 hp (28 kW) @ 11,000 rpm and had a maximum speed of 227 km/h (141 mph).

In 1961, Giacomo Agostini began his racing career on a Moto Morini Settebello “Short Rods”, coming second at Trento-Bondone. Agostini was Italian Cadet Champion in 1962, and Italian Junior Champion in 1963. Tarquinio Provini, riding a Moto Morini 250 GP, won the Italian Championship in 1961 and 1962. In 1963, Provini convinced Alfonso Morini that they should try for the World Championship. Provini waged a season-long battle with Honda's Jim Redman for the 250 world championship. Each rider won four races, and the title was not decided until the final race in Japan. The Japanese team (250cc four-cylinder) would not let Provini practice before the race, to hinder Morini's chances. Redman won the championship over Provini by only two points. The single cylinder 250 Morini is still the fastest single cylinder four-stroke 250cc racer to this day.

== Moto Morini 350 & 500 V-twins ==
In 1973, Moto Morini launched its first 72-degree V-twin engined motorcycles, designed by Franco Lambertini, and created by Franco and Gino Marchesini. The 350 Sport and Strada models displaced 344 cc and were complemented in 1977 by 500 cc Sport and Strada models. Equipment on the models was of high specification, and when released the Morini 3½ was around the same price as a Honda CB750.

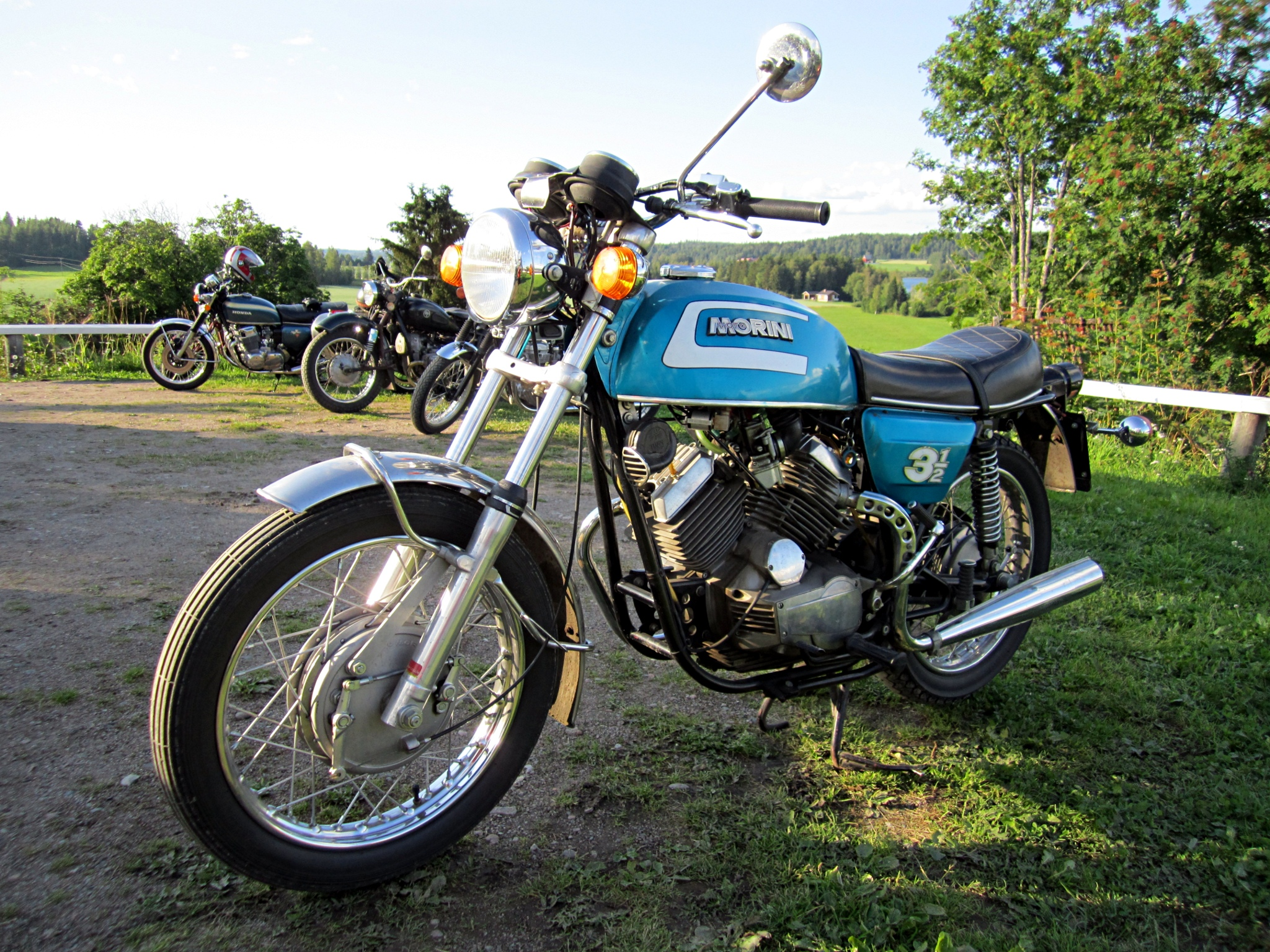
Moto Morini 3½ GT Strada

The Morini 3½ still has a loyal following, and a number of spare parts are available from specialist firms. The former editor of Classic Bike magazine, veteran motorcycle writer Hugo Wilson, has owned a 3½ Sport since 1982, and was still using it as a regular commuter machine in 2010.

The engine has Heron heads, which were milled flat, and the combustion chamber is recessed in the piston crown, aiding combustion and returning excellent fuel economy. A fuel consumption test by Motorcycling Monthly at Britain's Motor Industry Research Association in 1976 returned a performance of 65 miles per imperial gallon (4.3 L/100 km; 54 mpg_{‑US}), while a 3½ bike carried rider and pillion passenger. The engine also incorporated one piece forged steel crankshaft, ball main bearings (first series motors), plain big end bearings (second series motors), and the conrods run on a common pin, desaxe, and off-setting the cylinders to each other by 50 mm (2.0 in). Front and rear barrels and heads are interchangeable. VBH Dell'Orto (25 mm VHB 25 BS) square slide carburettors were fitted to the 350, with air fed via air-box with two filters. Bore and stroke was 62 mm × 57 mm (2.4 in × 2.2 in), respectively. The camshaft was driven by a small toothed belt, and was a revolutionary advance. They also included an electronic capacitor discharge ignition system designed by Ducati Elettronica. Early models had kick-start only but later ones also included a starter motor using three centrifugal friction shoes engaging the alternator rotor cover. The CDI ignition was powered by a coil in the alternator and using the kick-start a bike could be started and ridden with a flat battery.

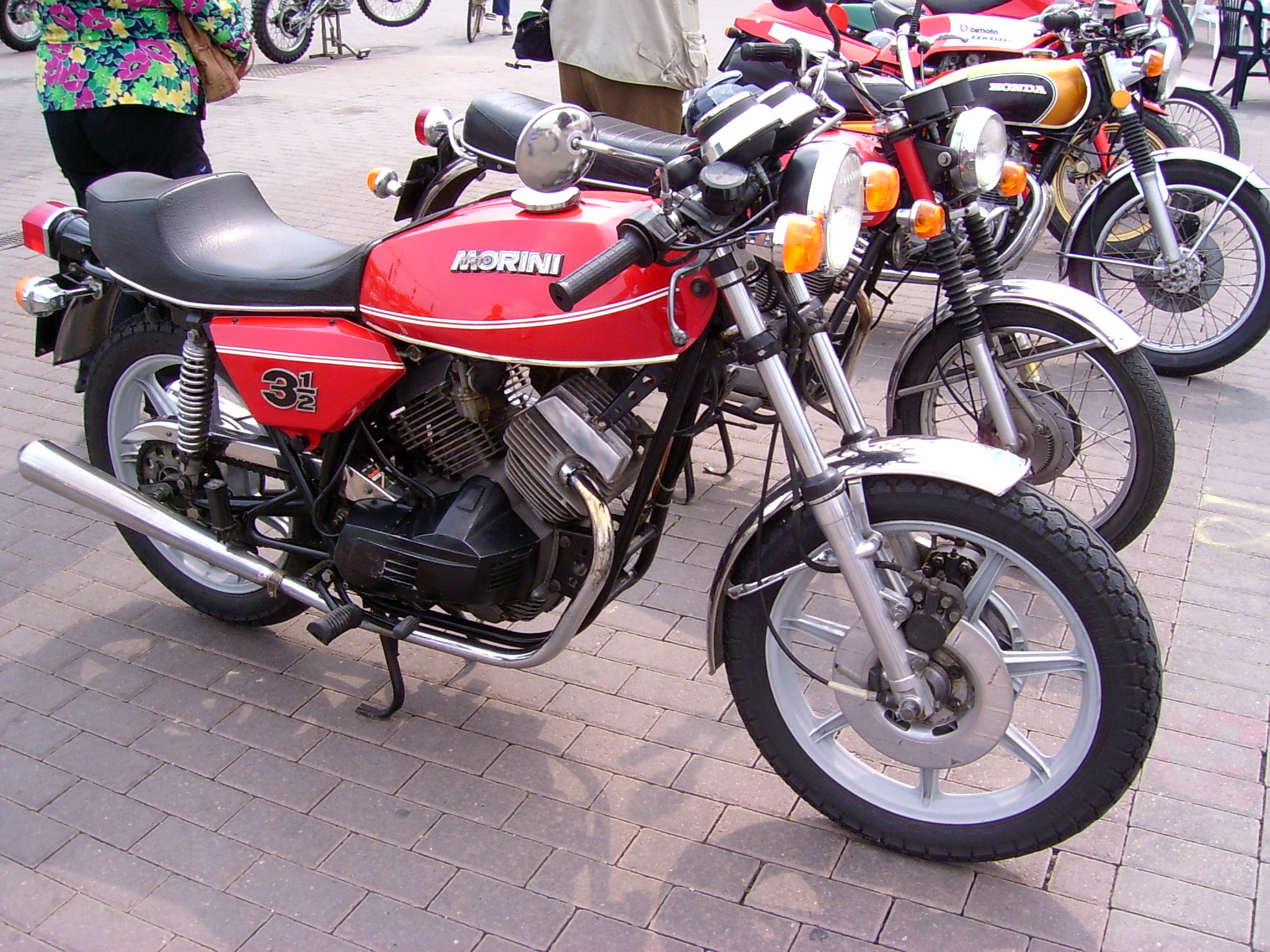
Moto Morini 3½ Sport

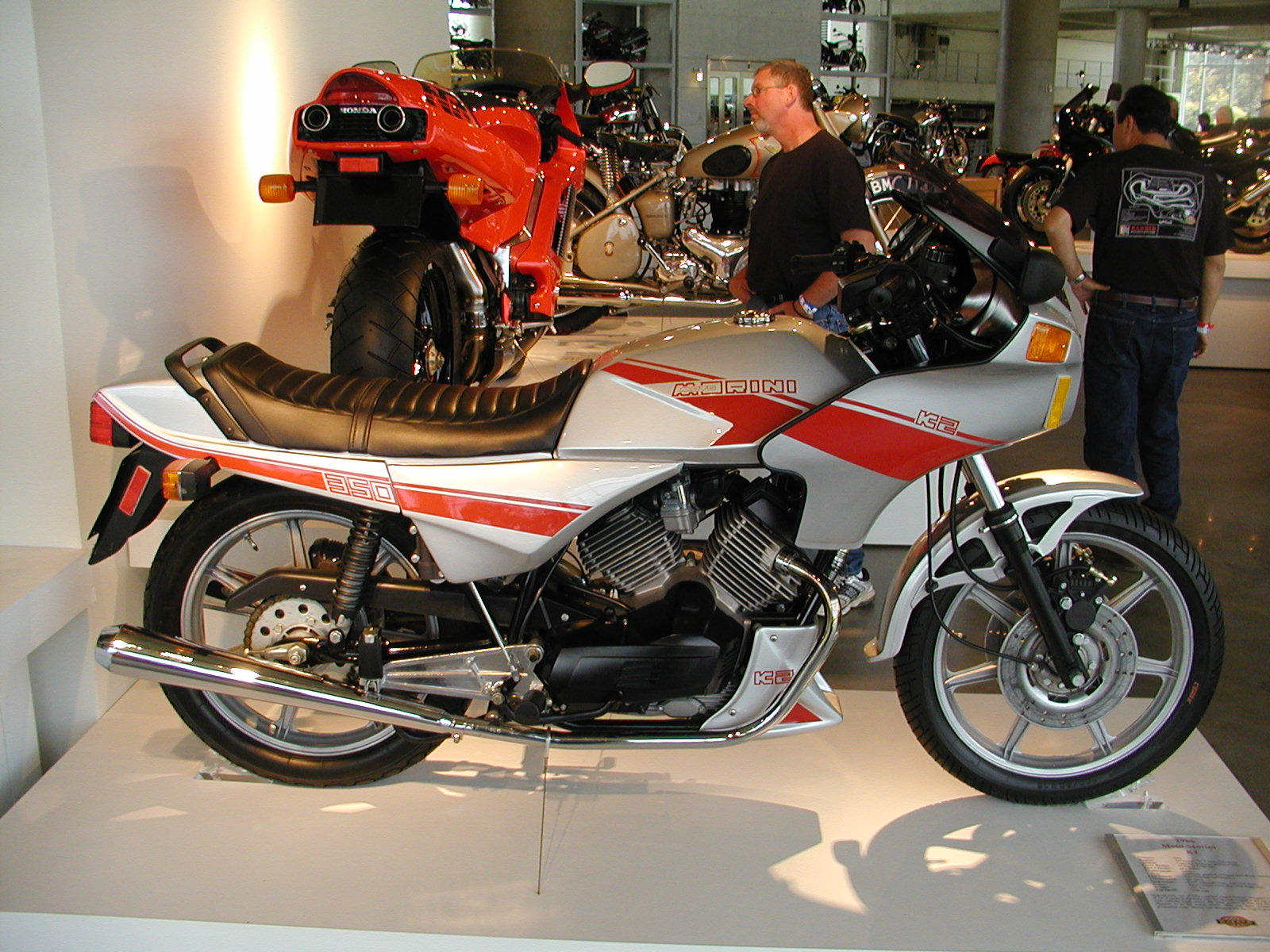
Moto Morini 350 K2 1986

The frame is a full steel duplex swingarm design, with Ceriani rear suspension, and Marzocchi front forks. The early models had a twin leading shoe drum brake up front (Strada: 200 mm (7.9 in) drum, Sport: 230 mm (9.1 in) drum) that was notoriously grabby on the Borrani spoked wheels, but these were replaced with a single chromed 260 mm (10.2 in) Grimeca disc in 1976, and later optional double discs. The rear drum brake was replaced in the early 1980s with a Grimeca disc. Switchgear, tail and brake lights were standard CEV items used on many Italian motorcycles of the 1970s. The month and year of manufacture is embossed in small figures on the side of each cast wheel, near where one of the seven cast spokes meets the rim. The helical gear transmission was a six-speed, with a top gear ratio of 1:0.954, making it akin to an overdrive. The transmission was engaged with a six-plate dry clutch, making a characteristic rattle similar to Ducatis when disengaged. Secondary drive was by a 5/8 x 3/8-inch chain to a rear sprocket with cush drive. Gear change is by right foot and the rear brake operated by left foot. Engine lubrication was by oil pump to the crankshaft but no force lubrication went to the rocker gear. Instead, crankcase pressure forced oil mist up the short pushrod tunnels to the rocker covers, where two 'crow's feet' allowed mist to condense and drip onto the rocker gear. Although ingenious, it required riders to gentle warm up their engines before using maximum revs, redlined at 9,200 rpm. Oil filtration was by plastic mesh filter.

The 1979 model incorporated a moulded tank-hugging seat, black crankcase side covers and a black exhaust system in homage to the Moto Guzzi Le Mans.

Footrests were placed too far forward for many riders and a common modification was to replace them with rearset footrests. Although not suitable for large riders, the 3½ was renowned for sharp and impeccable handling and was able to compete against larger capacity motorbikes on twisty roads. Maximum torque was above 6,000 rpm and so required high revving, similar to a two-stroke, to make the most of the engine's characteristics. Nevertheless, a 3½ Sport could still return 70 miles per imperial gallon (4.0 L/100 km; 58 mpg_{‑US}) when ridden hard. The 3½ Sport had a higher compression ratio than the softer-tuned Strada. The Sport featured Tomaselli clip-ons handlebars and throttle, a steering damper and Veglia instruments.

In November 1981 a 500 Turbo was shown at the Milan Show, producing 84 bhp (63 kW) at 8,300 rpm. It did not make it to production. An enduro version called the Camel 500 was released in 1981. In 1983 the Kanguro 350 was released.

In 1986 Moto Morini brought out a cruiser version, the Excalibur, available in 350 and 500 versions.

The 350 was conceived as a modular design, and single cylinder versions were made (looking like the V-twin with the rear cylinder removed). These were the 1975 six-speed 125 H and the 1978 250 T Mono, both unsuccessful, as was the later KJ 125 single of 1985. There was also a 239cc V-twin model known as the 250 2C.

=== 350 performance figures ===
- Strada 26 kW; 35 hp (35 PS) @ 8,000 rpm top speed 162kmh
- Sport 29 kW; 39 hp (40 PS) @ 8,500 rpm, 43 N⋅m (32 ft⋅lbf) @ 6,100 rpm.
- weight 145 kg (319 lb)
- top speed 175 kmh (108.7 mph)

=== 500 performance figures ===
- 31 kW (42 hp) @7,500 rpm
- Sport top speed 172 km/h (104 mph)
- Sport dry weight 167 kg (368 lb)

== Cagiva ==
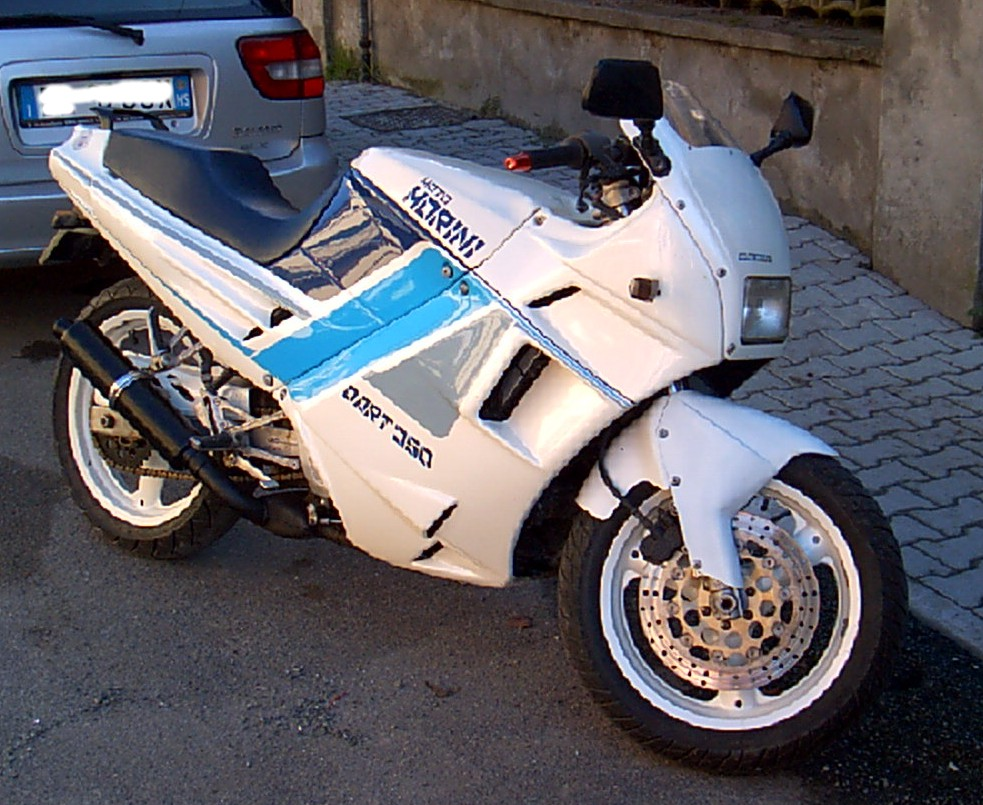
Moto Morini Dart

The early 1980s did not go as well for Moto Morini, with labour disputes and diminishing sales. On 18 February 1987 Gabriella Morini sold the firm to the Castiglioni firm, Cagiva. Despite their assurances that Moto Morini was important to them, the company was allowed to decline.

In 1988 the Dart 350, a fully race-faired version of the 72° V-twin, appeared. A 400 version was made in a small batch for the Japanese marked. In 1989 the last enduro version, the Coguaro appeared, in 350 and 500 versions, and another cruiser version, the New York, also in both capacities. These were extensions of other models, and little to no development was being undertaken.

Franco Lambertini had a new 60° engine design, but Cagiva was not interested. In the same year as the last models appeared, he left Moto Morini, and went to Piaggio-Gilera.

The Via Bergami factory was closed and by 1993 Excaliburs are assembled at Agostini works.

In 1996 Ducati and the Moto Morini name are sold to TPG. There were no plans to revive Moto Morini.

== Morini Franco Motori spa ==
In 1999, Morini Franco Motori spa bought the Moto Morini name from Ducati. Morini Franco Motori spa was founded in 1954 by Franco Morini, Alfonso's nephew. A new joint-stock company was officially presented in 2003, and the principal Moto Morini SPA shareholders were the Berti and Morini families.

=== Corsaro 1200, 9½, Corsaro Veloce, 1200 Sport, 1200 Avio and Scrambler ===
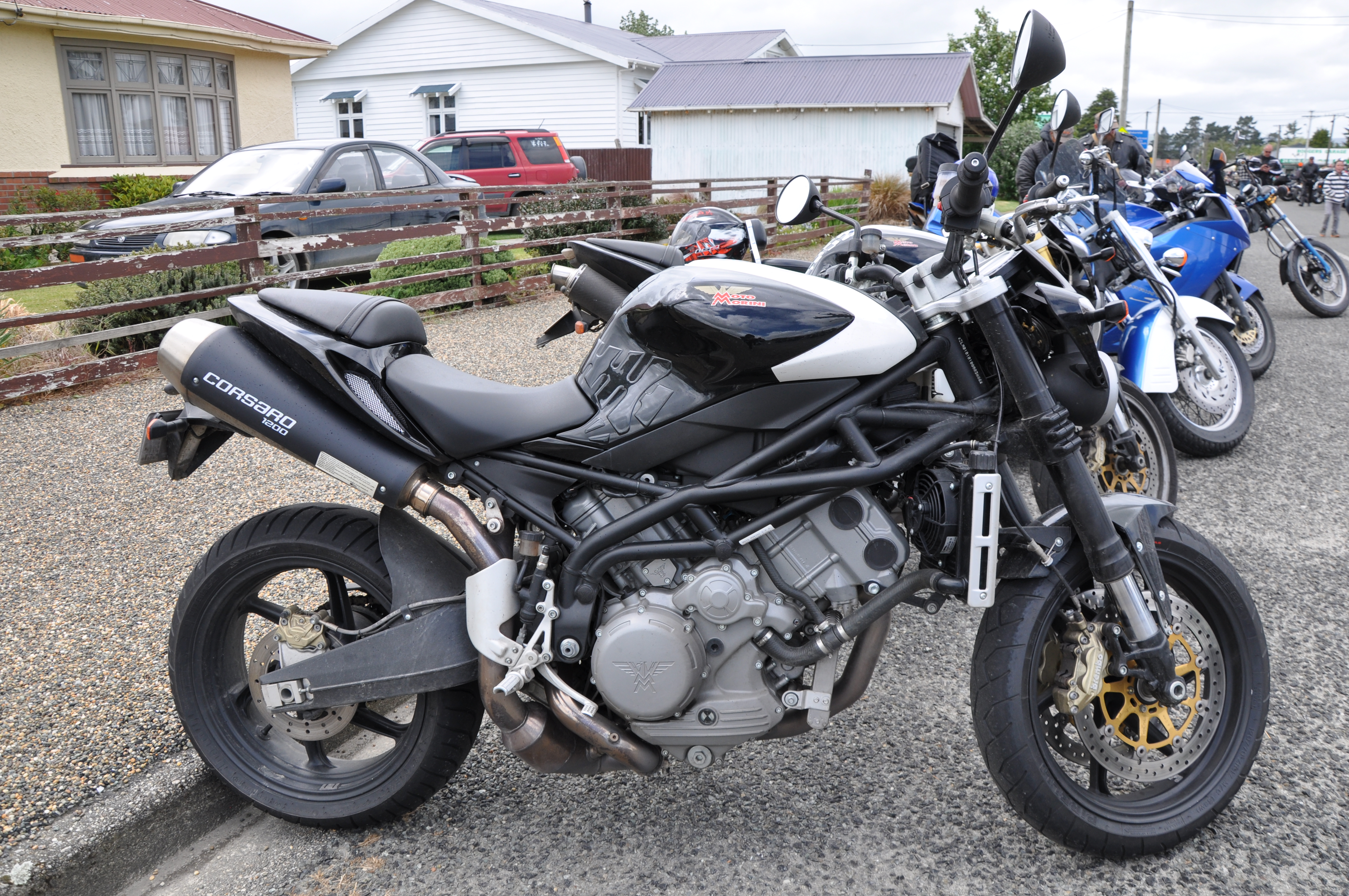
Moto Morini Corsaro 1200

In 2004, a new motorcycle was announced, the Corsaro 1200 naked bike, which appeared in 2005. It was followed by the "9½" road bike. There was criticism of the snatchy fuel injection mapping in these early models; however, power delivery was improved in time.

They were both powered by an 1187 cc Bialbero CorsaCorta 87° V twin-cylinder engine that developed 140 bhp (100 kW) at 8500 rpm, and 123 N⋅m (91 lb⋅ft) at 6,500 rpm, in the Corsaro, and 105 bhp (78 kW; 106 PS) at 8000 rpm in the 9½. The engine was designed by Franco Lambertini, who was the young engineer responsible for the "3½" model in the 1970s. The engines were tuned differently for different applications.

On 10 October 2006, a Corsaro Veloce 1200 was announced. In 2008, at the "Padova Motorcycles" fair, the 1200 Sport was announced (and went into production) together with the Scrambler, that was afterwards produced, from 2009, just in few pieces due to the sudden financial impasse of the company

=== Granferro: the unrealised dream ===
At the end of 2009, the latest marketing attempt by Morini was almost ready to enter the market: the hypermotard "Granferro", designed by Rodolfo Frascoli, of Marabese Design. Production was due to begin in April 2010. But the company was already in financial turmoil, and production was not launched.

=== Bankruptcy, liquidation and sale ===
The company went into voluntary liquidation in 2009, after failing to pay suppliers or staff in September while hoping to find further financing. Paolo Berlusconi – brother of Italian prime minister Silvio Berlusconi – was interested in buying Morini. He already owned the Garelli brand. However, he could not reach an agreement with the labour unions and he pulled off from the venture.

By July 2010, interested buyers could download a pdf of bike stock held by the company and being sold on a direct basis to customers. Prices in the "fire sale" included four red 2007 Moto Morini 9½s selling for €3,600 each, while other cheap deals included €4,800 for Corsaro Neros and also a stock of 42 variously coloured 1200 Sports selling for €5,760 each.

Some staff were recalled in early 2011 by the liquidator to construct a number of bikes from spare part stock. Liquidator Piero Aicardi believed there were enough parts left in the factory to build as many as 45 bikes, with the production being split between 16 Scramblers and 29 Granpasso, seven of which would use frames originally built for the stillborn Granferro.

After the sale of around 40 bikes assembled from remaining parts the company and the intellectual property were put up for sale in April 2011. Many potential bidders emerged; but the sale did not go through.

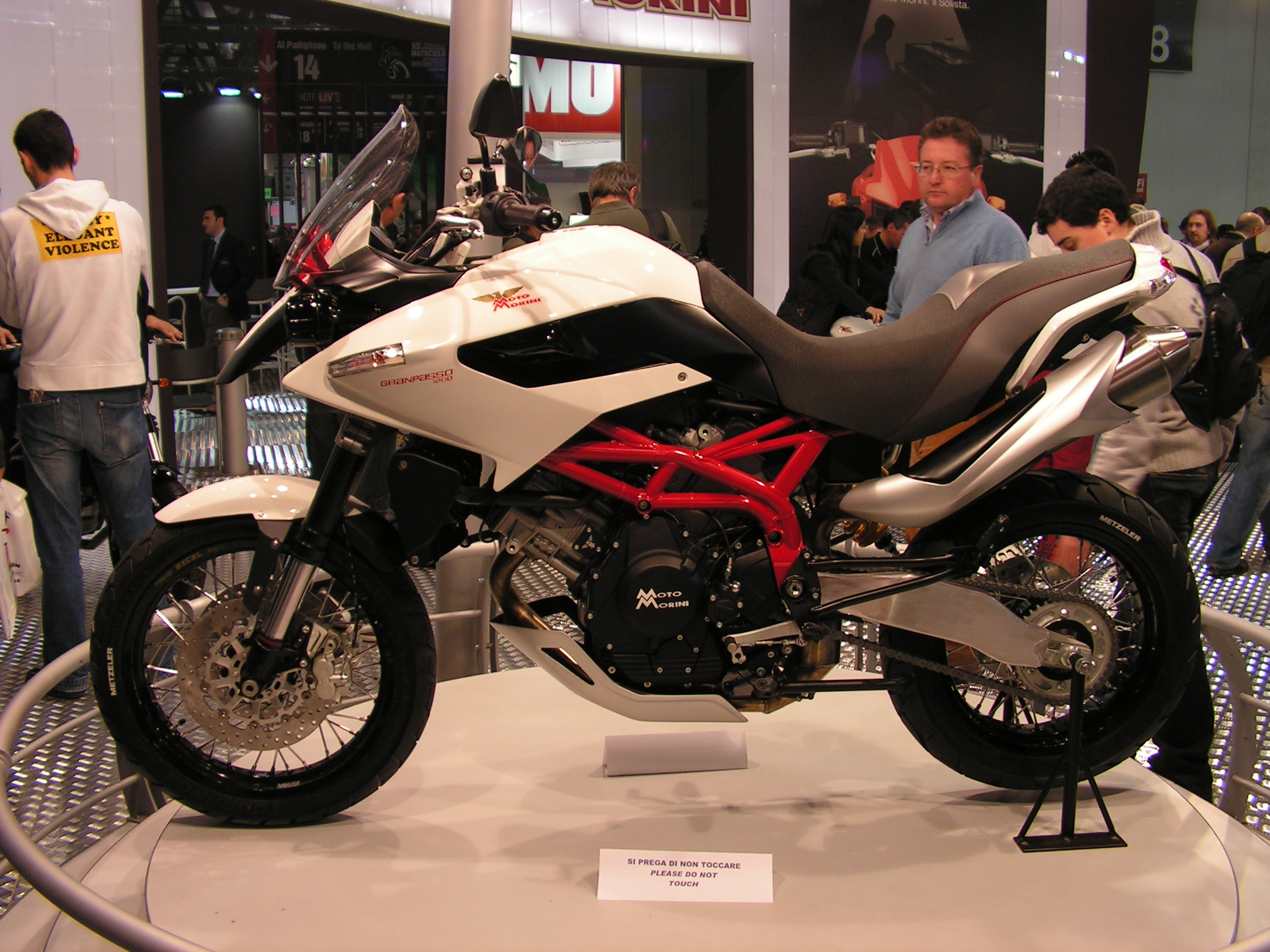
Moto Morini Granpasso 1200

Finally, in July 2011, the company was sold to Eagle Bike, a newly formed company that is run by two Italian entrepreneurs, Sandro Capotosti and Ruggeromassimo Jannuzzelli, for 1.96 million Euros. The factory was not included in the sale although they are thought to have a two-year lease on the premises.

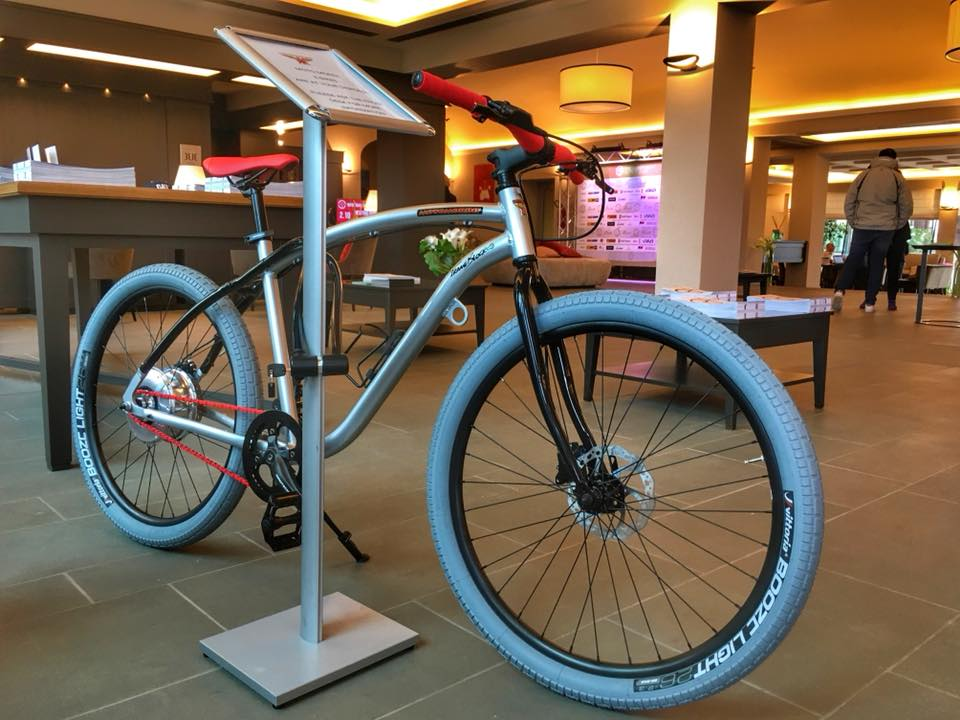
Moto Morini E-bike range includes the E-bike Urban: an assisted pedal bike with an urban look

== 2012, back on the market ==
In March 2012, the factory announced online auctioning of coupon in order to win a completely new and limited-edition model. It is the Rebello 1200 Giubileo, reinterpretation of the namesake bike from 1956. At the end of the auction, Moto Morini built 20 specimens of it to celebrate the 75 years of the brand.

In 2013 the Moto Morini range included Corsaro Veloce, Scrambler 1200 and Granpasso 1200. About 30 employees are involved in a production of 70 handmade and handcrafted specimens with spare parts coming mostly from Italy. The initial recovery program planned the achievement of a production capacity up to 5000 bikes per year and the employment of 100 workers before 2016. In the new production system the bikes are assembled by hand on customers' request.

Also in 2013, Moto Morini launched the bike rent forms that allowed clients to rent Moto Morini motorcycles for a short period of time. It also introduced the "buy-back" system: a long-term rent that allows customers to pay a monthly fee and decide, after some time, whether to keep the motorcycle or give it back to the factory. Sampler bikes and rented bikes were then sold at reduced prices. At the end of 2013 Moto Morini signed an agreement with the Indian company Vardenchi to provide them with engines.

In the summer of 2014 the headquarters and all Moto Morini locations moved from Casalecchio di Reno (BO) to Trivolzio (PV). Meanwhile, a new model was launched: the Moto Morini 11 1/2. In November 2014 a temporary shop in Milan was opened where Moto Morini showed the updated range.

In 2015 the company management changed and so did the trade policy: Moto Morini concludes contracts with dealers and distributors and ended the online sale. Moreover, also the production strategy changed, taking Moto Morini more and more to a direction where quality and customization are at the heart of the production. A Granpasso's makeover intended for the Japanese market, called Granpasso R, is launched. The specific characteristics of this model is the reduced ground clearance.

In 2016 Moto Morini increased the commercial structure in order to better manage the new sales network. In November Moto Morini returned to the 2016 edition of Eicma after seven years of absence with a new model: the Corsaro ZZ. Thanks to the presence at the International exhibition and a media campaign, Moto Morini appeared in many motorcycles magazines. In that period also the Facebook page was reopened.

In 2017 the 11 1/2 was no longer produced and the Moto Morini range included: Scrambler 1200, Granpasso 1200, Granpasso R, Corsaro 1200 ZZ. The Corsaro is the first Moto Morini model in Euro 4, with ABS and electronic gear shift. Furthermore, the lightning system is fully LED, the fuel tank is in aluminium and several body parts are made of carbon fiber as standard. Taking the bike to have the 99% of its components made in Italy. All the motorcycles are hand assembled, from the engine to the final product. In 2017 Moto Morini launched also the new One-off department, an internal area dedicated to customized models on clients' requests. To celebrate the 80 years of the company (1937 - 2017) Moto Morini created a limited edition of 8 specimens of a special Corsaro, called Corsaro80. This special model is improved with more body parts made of carbon fiber and hand hammered aluminium.

In July 2017 Moto Morini re-entered the bicycles market. As a matter of fact the company was already selling bicycles in the Sixties. Nowadays, it has introduced a limited-edition model of e-bike. The frame in completely in aluminium for a total weight of 13.5 kg. The engine and the battery are designed by the Politecnico di Milano and are both hidden in the hub, creating a more appealing look. Moto Morini produced 30 specimens of the pedal assisted bike in order to test the market. At the end of 2017, due to the success of the first e-bike, Moto Morini launched a range of four more models: Gravel, City, Urban and Sport. They all have the innovative Frame Block system: a solution integrated in the frame that works as a locker.

In Novemberì 2017 Moto Morini is present again at EICMA, exhibiting the Corsaro 1200 ZZ MY2018, the Milano, The Scrambler 1200 MY2018. The new Moto Morini Milano pays an homage to the famous Moto Morini 3 1/2, historic model of the company. In addition to that, Moto Morini showed also a customized version of the Corsaro ZZ, called Corsaro Ti22. In the spring of 2018 a new version of Corsaro, the Corsaro ZT, will be on the market.

In the autumn of 2018 it was announced that ownership had transferred to Zhongneng Vehicle Group.

In 2025, the X-Cape 1200 was introduced, equipped with an 87° V-twin 1,187 cc liquid-cooled engine, producing 122 hp at 8,500 rpm and 108 Nm of torque at 6,500 rpm. The six-speed transmission is paired with an assisted slipper clutch, designed to provide smoother operation under demanding conditions.

== Current models ==
Model	Engine	Years	Notes	Image
X-Cape 700	693 cc	2025–present	Straight-twin CFMoto, 4-stroke engine, DOHC, 8-valve, liquid cooling	Moto Morini X-Cape 700
X-Cape 1200	1187 cc	2025–present	87° V-twin, 4-stroke engine, DOHC, 8-valve, ′′Bialbero CorsaCorta′′ of 1187 cm^{3} liquid cooling	Moto Morini X-Cape 1200
Seiemmezzo STR	649 cc	2022–present	Straight-twin, CFMoto 4-stroke engine, DOHC, 8-valve, liquid cooling	Moto Morini Seiemmezzo STR
Seiemmezzo SCR	649 cc	2022–present	Straight-twin, CFMoto 4-stroke engine, DOHC, 8-valve, liquid cooling	Moto Morini Seiemmezzo SCR
Rumble	349 cc	2025–present	Straight-twin, 4-stroke engine, DOHC, 8-valve, liquid cooling	Moto Morini Rumble
3½ Sport	349 cc	2026–present	Straight-twin, 4-stroke engine, DOHC, 8-valve, liquid cooling	Moto Morini 3½ Sport
Calibro	693 cc	2024–present	Straight-twin, CFMoto 4-stroke engine, DOHC, 8-valve, liquid cooling	Moto Morini Calibro
Calibro Bagger	693 cc	2024–present	Straight-twin, CFMoto 4-stroke engine, DOHC, 8-valve, liquid cooling	Moto Morini Calibro Bagger
Corsaro 750	749 cc	2026–present	V-twin, 4-stroke engine, DOHC, liquid cooling	Moto Morini Corsaro 750
Corsaro 750 Sport	749 cc	2026–present	V-twin, 4-stroke engine, DOHC, liquid cooling	Moto Morini Corsaro 750 Sport
Corsaro 750 GT	749 cc	2026–present	V-twin, 4-stroke engine, DOHC, liquid cooling	Moto Morini Corsaro 750 GT
Alltrhike	449 cc	2025–present	Straight-twin, CFMoto 4-stroke engine, DOHC, 8-valve, liquid cooling	Moto Morini Alltrhike 450

== Past models ==
=== Road ===
Model	Engine	Years	Notes	Image
125 Turismo	123,17 cc, Single, Two-stroke engine, air-cooled	1946-1955		
125 Sport	123,17 cc, Single, Two-stroke engine, air-cooled	1947-1955		
175 Turismo	172.4 cc, Single-cylinder, 4-stroke engine, OHV 2-valves, air-cooled	1952-1957		Moto Morini 175 Turismo (1956)
175 Settebello	172.4 cc, Single-cylinder, 4-stroke engine, OHV 2-valves, air-cooled	1953-1957		Moto Morini 175 Settebello (1956)
175 GT	172.4 cc, Single-cylinder, 4-stroke engine, OHV 2-valves, air-cooled	1954-1957		
175 Briscola	172.4 cc, Single-cylinder, 4-stroke engine, OHV 2-valves, air-cooled	1956-1957		
175 Super Sport				
175 Tresette				
175 Tresette Sprint				Moto Morini 175 Tresette Sprint
3½ Turismo ("Strada" in South Africa and UK)	344,16 cc		72° V-twin, 4-stroke engine, OHV 4-valves, air-cooled	
3½ Sport	344,16 cc		72° V-twin, 4-stroke engine, OHV 4-valves, air-cooled	Moto Morini 3½ Sport, 1983
Corsarino 50 V (In the US, the 60cc Twister and Pirate)	48,82 cc	1963 - 1966		
125 H	122,96 cc	1975 - 1985	Single-cylinder, 4-stroke engine, OHV 2-valves, air-cooled	
125 T				
3½ GT	344,16 cc		72° V-twin, 4-stroke engine, OHV 4-valves, air-cooled	
250 T				
250 2C (J)				
350 K2	344,16 cc		72° V-twin, 4-stroke engine, OHV 4-valves, air-cooled	Moto Morini 350 K2
Dart 350	344,16 cc		72° V-twin, 4-stroke engine, OHV 4-valves, air-cooled	
Dart 400	390 cc		72° V-twin, 4-stroke engine, OHV 4-valves, air-cooled	
Corsaro 1200	1187 cc	2005 - 2010	87° V-twin, 4-stroke engine, DOHC 8-valve, ′′Bialbero CorsaCorta′′ of 1187 cm^{3} liquid cooling	Moto Morini Corsaro 1200
Corsaro 1200 Veloce	1187 cc	2012 - 2014	87° V-twin, 4-stroke engine, DOHC 8-valve, ′′Bialbero CorsaCorta′′ of 1187 cm^{3} liquid cooling	
Corsaro 1200 Avio	1187 cc	2008 - 2010	87° V-twin, 4-stroke engine, DOHC 8-valve, ′′Bialbero CorsaCorta′′ of 1187 cm^{3} liquid cooling	Moto Morini Corsaro 1200 Avio
9½	1187 cc	2006 - 2009	87° V-twin, 4-stroke engine, DOHC 8-valve, ′′Bialbero CorsaCorta′′ of 1187 cm^{3} liquid cooling	Moto Morini 9½
1200 Sport	1187 cc	2009 - 2009	87° V-twin, 4-stroke engine, DOHC 8-valve, ′′Bialbero CorsaCorta′′ of 1187 cm^{3} liquid cooling	
1200 Rebello Giubileo	1187 cc	2012 - 2012	87° V-twin, 4-stroke engine, DOHC 8-valve, ′′Bialbero CorsaCorta′′ of 1187 cm^{3} liquid cooling	Moto Morini Rebello 1200 Giubileo (2014)
Granpasso / Granpasso R	1187 cc	2008 - 2019	87° V-twin, 4-stroke engine, DOHC 8-valve, ′′Bialbero CorsaCorta′′ of 1187 cm^{3} liquid cooling	Moto Morini GranPasso R (2016)
Scrambler	1187 cc	2012 - 2019	87° V-twin, 4-stroke engine, DOHC 8-valve, ′′Bialbero CorsaCorta′′ of 1187 cm^{3} liquid cooling	
11½	1187 cc	2014 - 2017	87° V-twin, 4-stroke engine, DOHC 8-valve, ′′Bialbero CorsaCorta′′ of 1187 cm^{3} liquid cooling	
Super Scambler 1200	1187 cc	2019 - 2021	87° V-twin, 4-stroke engine, DOHC, 8-valve, ′′Bialbero CorsaCorta′′ of 1187 cm^{3} liquid cooling	
Corsaro 1200 ZZ	1187 cc	2017 - 2022	87° V-twin, 4-stroke engine, DOHC, 8-valve, ′′Bialbero CorsaCorta′′ of 1187 cm^{3} liquid cooling	
Corsaro 1200 ZT	1187 cc	2018–2022	87° V-twin, 4-stroke engine, DOHC, 8-valve, ′′Bialbero CorsaCorta′′ of 1187 cm^{3} liquid cooling	
Milano	1187 cc	2018–2022	87° V-twin, 4-stroke engine, DOHC, 8-valve, ′′Bialbero CorsaCorta′′ of 1187 cm^{3} liquid cooling	Moto Morini Milano

=== Dual sport ===
Model	Engine	Years	Notes	Image
Corsaro Country 125	123,08 cc	1970 -	Single-cylinder, 4-stroke engine, OHV 2-valves, air-cooled	Moto Morini Corsaro Country 125
Kanguro 350	344cc	1981 -	72° V-twin, 4-stroke engine, OHV 4-valves, air-cooled	
Camel 500	478,00 cc	1981 - 1984	72° V-twin, 4-stroke engine, OHV 4-valves, air-cooled	Moto Morini Camel 500
X-Cape 650	649 cc	2021–2024	Straight-twin, CFMoto 4-stroke engine, DOHC, 8-valve, liquid cooling	Moto Morini X-Cape 650

== Palmares ==
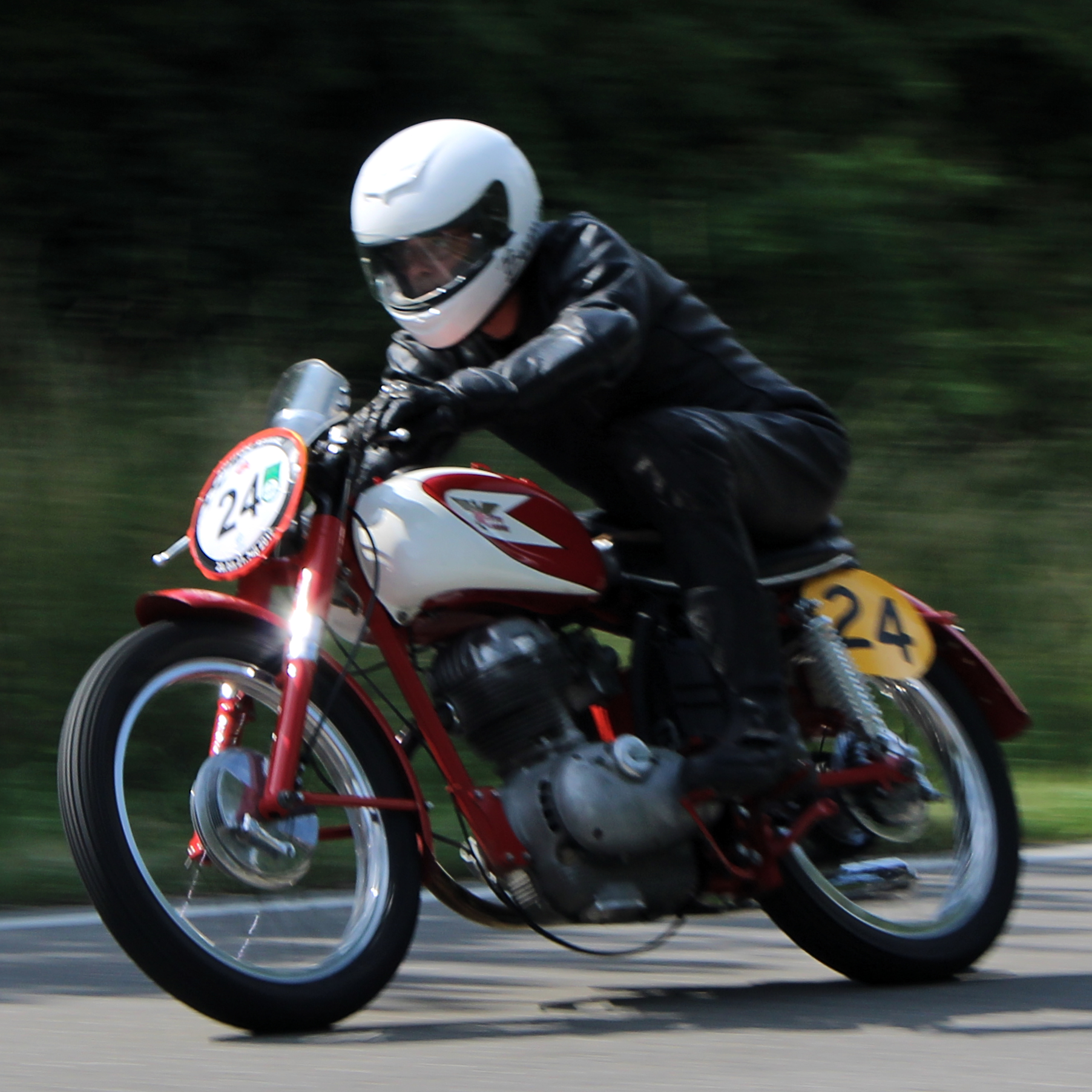
Moto Morini 175 Settebello, 1955

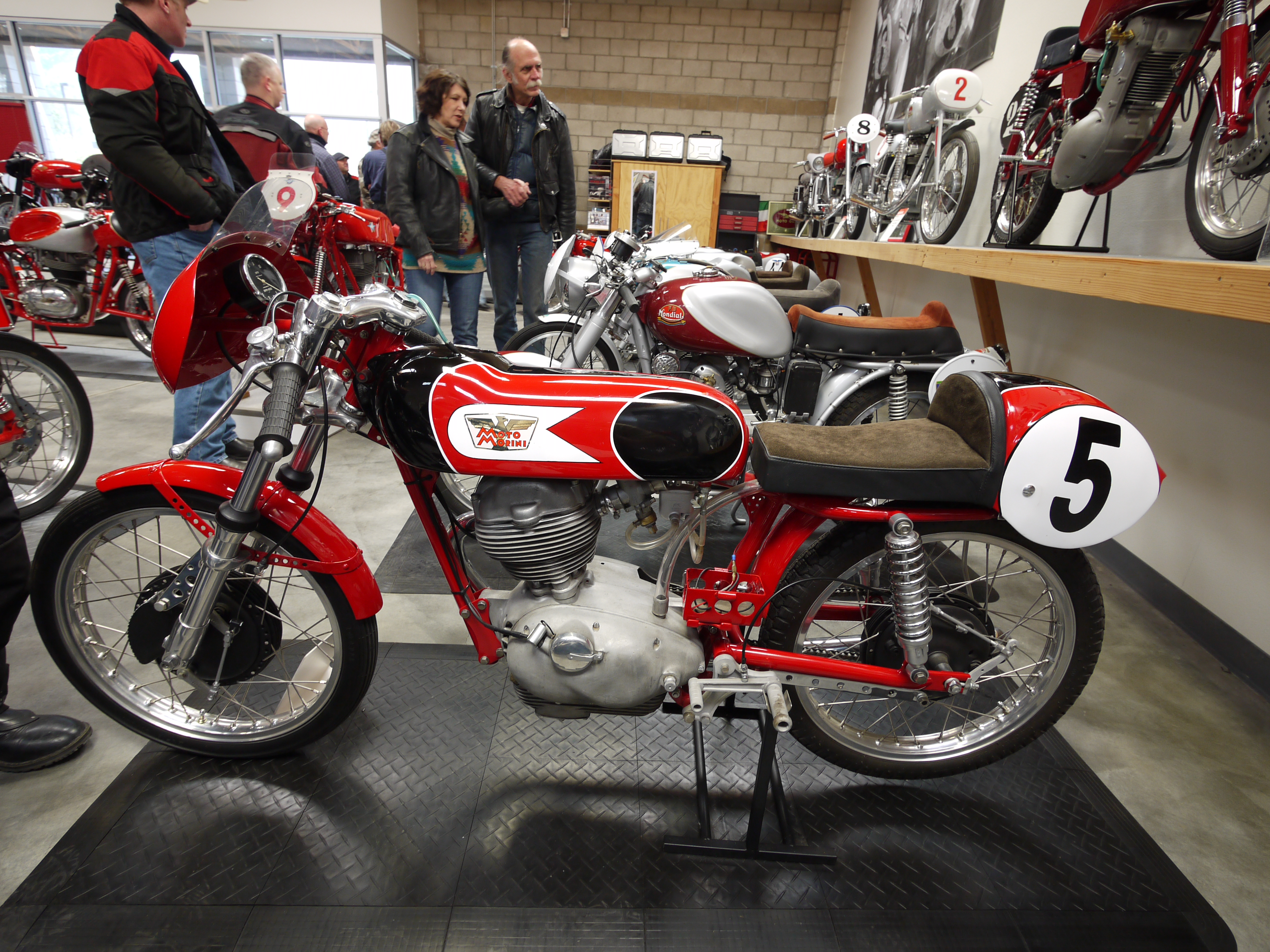
Moto Morini 175 Settebello Aste Corte, 1961

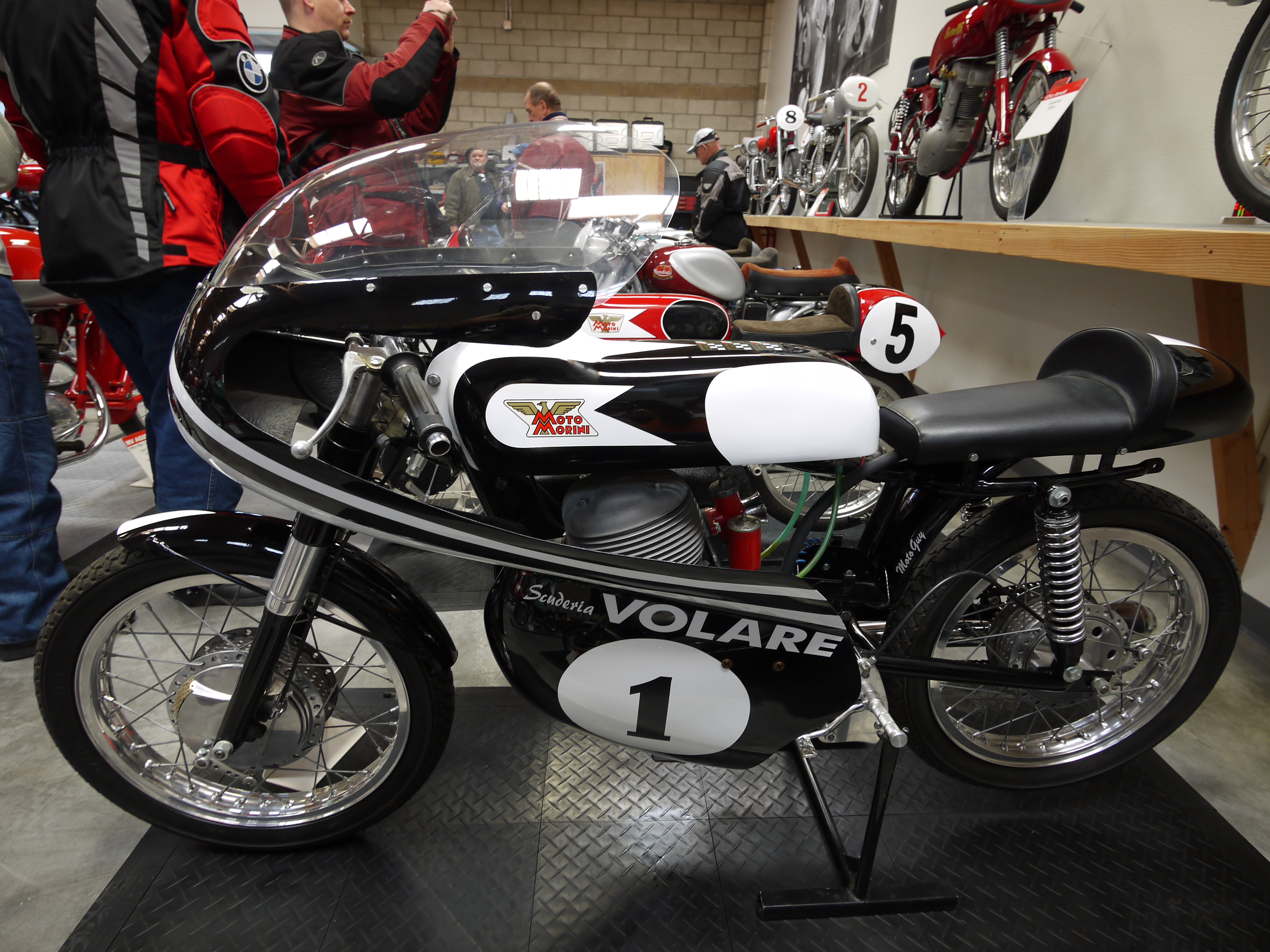
Moto Morini 175 Sprint F3 Corsa, 1959

=== Italian Speed championship ===
Year	Champion	Class	Motorcycle
1948	(Italy) Raffaele Alberti	125 cm^{3}	
1949	(Italy) Umberto Masetti	125 cm^{3}	
1953	(Italy) Emilio Mendogni	125 cm^{3}	
1954	(Italy) Emilio Mendogni	125 cm^{3}	
1961	(Italy) Tarquinio Provini	250 cm^{3}	
1962	(Italy) } Tarquinio Provini	250 cm^{3}	
1963	(Italy) Tarquinio Provini	250 cm^{3}	
1964	(Italy) Giacomo Agostini	250 cm^{3}	

== See also ==
- List of Italian companies
- List of motorcycle manufacturers
