= Sergio Frascoli =

Italian footballer

Personal information
- Date of birth: 14 March 1936 (age 90)
- Place of birth: San Giorgio su Legnano
- Height: 1.80 m (5 ft 11 in)
- Position: Midfielder

Senior career*
Years	Team	Apps	(Gls)
1955–1957	Pro Patria	63	(1)
1957–1958	Monza	28	(0)
1958–1960	Pro Patria	52	(1)
1960–1963	Venezia	99	(2)
1963–1964	Roma	12	(0)
1964–1966	SPAL	31	(2)
1966–1967	Pescara	23	(?)
- * Club domestic league appearances and goals

Sergio Frascoli (born 14 March 1936 in San Giorgio su Legnano) is a retired Italian professional football player.

He played 6 seasons (113 games, 4 goals) in the Serie A for Aurora Pro Patria 1919, S.S.C. Venezia, A.S. Roma and SPAL 1907.
