= Ray Amm =

Rhodesian motorcycle racer

- Nationality: Rhodesian
- Born: 10 December 1927; Salisbury, Southern Rhodesia
- Died: 11 April 1955 (aged 27); Imola, Italy
Motorcycle racing career statistics
Grand Prix motorcycle racing
Active years	1951 - 1954
First race	1951 350 cc Isle of Man TT
Last race	1954 350 cc Nations Grand Prix
First win	1952 350 cc Nations Grand Prix
Last win	1954 350 cc German Grand Prix
Team(s)	Norton, MV Agusta
Starts / Wins / Podiums / Poles / F. laps / Points; 19 / 6 / 16 / 0 / 9 / 104

William Raymond Amm (10 December 1927 – 11 April 1955) was a Rhodesian professional Grand Prix motorcycle road racer. He competed in the FIM motorcycle Grand Prix world championships from 1951 to 1954. Amm was a six-time Grand Prix race winner including three victories at the Isle of Man TT when, he died in 1955 after an accident during a race in Italy.

== Biography ==
Born in Salisbury, Southern Rhodesia, Amm was a motorcycle dealer and managed a workshop in his hometown. He began racing when he was 17 years old. After the purchase of an AJS motorcycle shortly after the end of the Second World War, Amm started grasstrack racing near Salisbury and finished last in his first race. The next season the AJS motorcycle was replaced with a Triumph motorcycle. The purchase of a brand new Norton motorcycle allowed Amm to enter the prestigious 1949 Port Elizabeth 200 Motor-Cycle Race in South Africa and despite breaking the lap-record he finished in 17th place when the clutch started to slip. Again entering the 1950 Port Elizabeth 200, Amm finished in first place for the 500 cc race and set a new lap record of 95.86 mph. Another win followed in the 500 cc class for the 1951 Port Elizabeth 2000 Race despite suffering carburation problems. After these successes the Salisbury Motor-Cycle Club helped with his passage to compete in Europe.

=== Racing in Europe ===
After ordering two Norton Manx motorcycles before leaving Rhodesia for the 1951 Grand Prix motorcycle racing season, Amm discovered on arriving in Europe that they would not be delivered until the start of practice for the 1951 Isle of Man TT Races. To practice on short circuits before the Manx Nortons where delivered, a 'hack' 7R AJS motorcycle was purchased and Ray Amm won the 350 cc class at a Peveril M.C. & L.C.C. meeting in the Isle of Man.

The two Manx Nortons arrived on the first day of practice for the 1951 Isle of Man TT Races. Despite trouble with a gear lever finished in ninth place for the 1951 Junior TT Race at an average race speed of 81.59 mph. After a 20-minute delay, Amm finished in 28th place for the 1951 Senior TT Race at an average race speed of 75.42 mph. For the 1952 Isle of Man TT Race, Amm crashed at Braddan Bridge on lap 3 of the Junior Race. This was followed by a third place in the 1952 Senior TT Race at an average race speed of 92.40 mph, a race that was won by Reg Armstrong for Norton.

=== Norton Team 1952-1954 ===
For the 1952 Dutch TT, Amm was a full member of the Norton team and was second to Geoff Duke in the 350cc Dutch TT and retired from the 500 cc race. At the 1952 German Grand Prix held at Solitude, Amm crashed and broke a leg, returning later in the 1952 Grand Prix motorcycle racing season to win the 350 cc class for the 1952 Nations Grand Prix held at Monza in Italy.

For the 1953 racing season, Amm debuted the controversial Norton Kneeler 350cc motorcycle at the 1953 North West 200 Race. Despite overheating problems the Norton Kneeler with the nickname the "Amm Sandwich" or "Silver-Fish", Amm finished in ninth place in the 350 cc class that was eventually won by Bob McIntyre at an average race speed of 86.86 mph. Despite testing the Norton Kneeler for practice for the 1953 Isle of Man TT Races, Amm reverted to the non-streamlined Norton motorcycles due to handling problems with cross-winds on the Mountain Section of the course and also opposition by the TT Race Scrutineers. It proved a good choice as Amm won the 1953 Junior TT Race at an average race speed of 90.52 mph from Ken Kavanagh in second place and Fergus Anderson in 3rd place. Another win in the 1953 Senior TT Race for Amm at an average race speed of 93.85 mph completed a prestigious Junior/Senior TT double win for the works Norton team. Following Amm during the 1953 Senior TT Race, Geoff Duke commented on Amm's distinctive riding style;- "After I had caught and passed Ray Amm on the Norton, he passed me at Ballaugh when I missed a gearchange! Then there was the frightening experience of following him to the end of the lap, Ray could be pretty lurid when he was trying!" A fall at the 1953 French Grand Prix at Rouen in the 350cc class broke a collar-bone and brought about a premature end to championship ambitions for Amm for the 1953 Grand Prix motorcycle racing season. However, Amm returned to the abortive Norton Kneeler project in November 1953 to set a number of world speed records at Montlhéry, France raising the hour speed endurance record to a distance of 133.70 miles. Also at Montlhéry in November 1953, Amm shared a streamlined Norton Sidecar outfit with Eric Oliver to set further speed records.

Again riding for the works Norton in 1954 Isle of Man TT Races, despite leading the 1954 Junior TT a retirement on lap 5 for Amm, allowed Rod Coleman to become the first New Zealander to win a TT Race at an average race speed of 91.51 mph. The 1954 Senior TT race was delayed due to weather conditions and reduced visibility on the Mountain Section of the course. The race is held after a short delay and starts at mid-day. Despite the conditions, Geoff Duke riding the works Gilera and led Amm riding for Norton by 14 seconds on lap 1. On the second lap, Duke lapped in 26 minutes and 23 seconds at an average speed of 86.97 mph and Amm lapped at an average speed of 86.49 to reduce the lead to just 2 seconds. Further heavy rain and low cloud on the Mountain Section reduced speed further and on lap 2 and Amm used "feet-down" tactics on the slower corners. Then Duke decided to refuel on lap 3 and Amm in second place went straight through without stopping and now led Duke by 32 seconds. At the Windy Corner on lap 4, the visibility was down to 20 yards and a decision was made to stop the race because of the conditions. This allowed Amm, due to refuel at the TT Grandstand on lap 4, to win the highly controversial 1954 Senior TT Race in 1 hour, 42 minutes and 46.8 seconds at an average race speed of 88.12 mph.

=== 1954 Isle of Man Senior TT 500 cc final standings ===
Friday 18 June 1954 - 4 Laps (150.92 Miles) Mountain Course.

Place	Rider	Number	Country	Machine	Speed	Time
1	Ray Amm		Rhodesia	Norton	88.12 mph	1:42.46.8
2	(United Kingdom) Geoff Duke		United Kingdom	Gilera	87.19 mph	1:43.52.6
3	(United Kingdom) Jack Brett		United Kingdom	Norton	86.04 mph	1:45.15.2

The next event after the 1954 Isle of Man TT Races was the Ulster Grand Prix held at the Dundrod Circuit in Northern Ireland. In an event that was much affected by rain, Amm won the 350 cc Ulster Grand Prix at an average race speed of 83.47 mph from Jack Brett in second place and Bob McIntyre in third place. The 500 cc Ulster Grand Prix was reduced from 27 laps to 15 laps due to heavy rain and again the race was won by Amm at an average race speed of 83.87 mph, although later these result was excluded from the World Championship by the FIM. A further Grand Prix win in 1954 followed for Amm with another 350 cc victory at the German Grand Prix held at Solitudering. At the end of the 1954 Grand Prix motorcycle racing season, Amm finished in second place in both the 350 cc and 500 cc classifications behind world champions Fergus Anderson and Geoff Duke.

=== 1954 Grand Prix motorcycle racing season 500 cc Standings ===
Place	Rider	Number	Country	Machine	Points	Wins
1	(United Kingdom) Geoff Duke		United Kingdom	Gilera	40	5
2	Ray Amm	93	Rhodesia	Norton	20	1
3	(Australia) Ken Kavanagh		Australia	Moto Guzzi	16	0

=== 1954 Grand Prix motorcycle racing season 350 cc Standings ===
Place	Rider	Number	Country	Machine	Points	Wins
1	(United Kingdom) Fergus Anderson		United Kingdom	Moto Guzzi	38	4
2	Ray Amm		Rhodesia	Norton	22	2
3	(New Zealand) Rod Coleman	33	New Zealand	AJS	20	1

=== Moving to MV Agusta Team 1955 ===
Despite many offers Amm finally moved from the works Norton motorcycles to the factory MV Agusta racing team. The debut race for Amm and MV Agusta was to be the 1955 Easter Monday race meeting at the Autodromo Enzo e Dino Ferrari in Imola, Italy. Riding a 350cc four-cylinder MV Agusta in the Coppa d'Oro Shell Race, Amm lost control at the Rivazza Corner as he pursued Kavanagh and crashed in slippery conditions and died of his injuries on the way to hospital.

== Race results ==
=== TT Race Victories ===
Year	Race & Capacity	Motorcycle	Average Speed
1953	Junior 350 cc	Norton	90.52 mph
1953	Senior 500 cc	Norton	93.85 mph
1954	Senior 500 cc	Norton	88.12 mph

=== TT Career Summary ===
Finishing Position	1st	3rd	9th	28th	DNF
Number of times	3	1	1	1	2

== FIM Motor-Cycle Grand Prix Results ==
**Position**	1	2	3	4	5	6
**Points**	8	6	4	3	2	1

(key) (Races in bold indicate pole position)

Year	Class	Team	1	2	3	4	5	6	7	8	9	Points	Rank	Wins
1951	350 cc	Norton	ESP -	SUI -	IOM; 9	BEL -	NED -	FRA -	ULS -	NAT -		0	-	0
1951	500 cc	Norton	ESP -	SUI -	IOM; 28	BEL -	NED -	FRA -	ULS -	NAT -		0	-	0
1952	350 cc	Norton	SUI; 6	IOM; NC	NED; 2	BEL; 2	GER -	ULS -	NAT; 1			21	**3rd**	1
1952	500 cc	Norton	SUI; 6	IOM; 3	NED -	BEL; 3	GER -	ULS -	NAT -	ESP; 9		9	10th	0
1953	350 cc	Norton	IOM; 1	NED; 2	BEL; 3	GER -	FRA -	ULS -	SUI -	NAT -	ESP -	18	**3rd**	1
1953	500 cc	Norton	IOM; 1	NED -	BEL; 2	GER -	FRA -	ULS -	SUI -	NAT -	ESP -	14	5th	1
1954	350 cc	Norton	FRA -	IOM; NC	ULS; 1	BEL -	NED -	GER; 1	SUI; 3	NAT; 5	ESP -	22	**2nd**	2
1954	500 cc	Norton	FRA -	IOM; 1	ULS; 1 †	BEL -	NED -	GER; 2	SUI; 2	NAT -	ESP -	20	**2nd**	1

† The 500 cc race was stopped by bad weather, and the FIM excluded the race from the World Championship.
