= Guido Sala =

Italian motorcycle racer (1928–1987)

- Nationality: Italian
Motorcycle racing career statistics
Grand Prix motorcycle racing
| Active years | 1952, 1954, 1957 |
| First race | 1952 125cc Dutch TT |
| Last race | 1957 250cc Nations Grand Prix |
| First win | 1954 125cc Nations Grand Prix |
| Last win | 1954 125cc Nations Grand Prix |
| Team | MV Agusta |
Starts / Wins / Podiums / Poles / F. laps / Points; 8 / 1 / 1 / 0 / 1 / 15

Guido Sala (15 December 1928 – 13 April 1987) was an Italian Grand Prix motorcycle road racer and world champion kart racer. His best year in Grand Prix motorcycle racing was in 1954 when he won the 125cc Nations Grand Prix and finished seventh in the world championship.

Sala later switched to kart racing, winning the first-ever FIA Karting World Championship in 1964, and repeating as champion in 1965.

== Motorcycle Grand Prix results ==
| **Position** | 1 | 2 | 3 | 4 | 5 | 6 |
| **Points** | 8 | 6 | 4 | 3 | 2 | 1 |

Bold = Pole position

Italic = Fastest lap

| Year | Class | Motorcycle | 1 | 2 | 3 | 4 | 5 | 6 | 7 | 8 | Points | Rank | Wins |
|---|---|---|---|---|---|---|---|---|---|---|---|---|---|
| 1952 | 125 cc | MV Agusta | IOM - | NED; 4 | GER - | ULS - | NAT; 5 | ESP; DNF | | | 6 | 9th | 0 |
| 1954 | 125 cc | MV Agusta | | IOM - | ULS - | NED - | GER - | | NAT; 1 | ESP - | 8 | 7th | 1 |
| 1954 | 250 cc | ? | FRA - | IOM - | ULS - | NED - | GER - | SUI - | NAT; DNF | | 0 | – | 0 |
| 1955 | 125 cc | MV Agusta | ESP - | FRA - | IOM - | GER - | NED - | NAT; 7 | | | 0 | - | 0 |
| 1957 | 125 cc | FB Mondial | GER - | IOM - | NED - | BEL - | ULS - | NAT; 6 | | | 1 | 13th | 0 |
| 1957 | 250 cc | FB Mondial | GER - | IOM - | NED - | BEL - | ULS - | NAT; DNF | | | 0 | - | 0 |
