= Georg Braun (motorcyclist) =

German motorcycle racer (1918–1995)

- Nationality: German
Motorcycle racing career statistics
Grand Prix motorcycle racing
Active years	1953 – 1954
First race	1953 125cc Spanish Grand Prix
Last race	1954 250cc Swiss Grand Prix
Team	NSU
Starts / Wins / Podiums / Poles / F. laps / Points; 3 / 0 / 1 / N/A / N/A / 8

Georg Braun (2 September 1918 in Hechingen, Province of Hohenzollern – 4 April 1995 in Hechingen) was a German Grand Prix motorcycle road racer.

== Motorcycle racing career ==
Braun's first foray into racing in 1939 was ended by the war. In 1950, as a 32-year-old "newcomer", he won 6 of 8 races with his supercharged DKW. Engines of this kind were not allowed on international level, where Germans could compete again from 1951 onwards. Braun then rode several machines, like Horex and NSU Sportmax, or a 250cc Moto Parilla with which he finished 3rd in the Feldbergrennen at Oberreifenberg in the Taunus mountains.

In the 1953 Grand Prix season, Braun was jointly ranked, together with five others, in 17th place in the 125cc class, riding a Mondial. His sixth place at the Spanish motorcycle Grand Prix had earned him a single point. In the 350cc and 500cc classes, he entered on Horex machines.

The best result of Braun's Grand Prix career was scored in a wet race, the 1954 Swiss motorcycle Grand Prix at Bern's Circuit Bremgarten. Riding a NSU he finished second behind Rupert Hollaus who took the checkered flag after 1 hour, 1min and 56 sec. This earned him 6 points and a sixth rank in the 250cc class of the 1954 season.

The same year, Braun also finished sixth on a 350cc Horex at his home German motorcycle Grand Prix on Stuttgart's Solitudering, which ranked him 17th with 4 points.

Braun crashed and suffered injuries in the 1955 Isle of Man TT. After recovering, he competed again at his home race on the Solitude. Due to lack of success, old age, and the declining motorcycle sales in Germany, he retired to operate an automobile repair shop and filling station in his home town of Hechingen, where he died a few years ago.

== Motorcycle Grand Prix results ==
Position	1	2	3	4	5	6
Points	8	6	4	3	2	1

(Races in italics indicate fastest lap)

Year	Class	Team	1	2	3	4	5	6	7	8	9	Points	Rank	Wins
1953	125cc	Mondial	IOM -	NED -	GER -	ULS -	NAT -	ESP; 6				1	17th	0
1954	250cc	NSU	FRA -	IOM -	ULS -		NED -	GER -	SUI; 2	NAT -		6	6th	0
1954	350cc	Horex	FRA -	IOM -	ULS -	BEL -	NED -	GER; 6	SUI -	NAT -	ESP -	1	17th	0

== Literature ==
- Eugen K. Schwarz: Porträt des Motorrad-Rennfahrers Georg Braun und seine Erfolge auf Horex, DKW und Parilla, MOTORRAD, 1955
