= Rupert Hollaus =

Austrian motorcycle racer (1931–1954)

- Nationality: Austrian
Motorcycle racing career statistics
Grand Prix motorcycle racing
Active years	1952 - 1954
First race	1952 250cc West German Grand Prix
Last race	1954 250cc Swiss Grand Prix
First win	1954 Isle of Man 125cc Ultra-Lightweight TT
Last win	1954 250cc Swiss Grand Prix
Team	NSU
Championships	125cc - 1954
Starts / Wins / Podiums / Poles / F. laps / Points; 11 / 5 / 10 / 0 / 5 / 63

Rupert Hollaus (4 September 1931 – 11 September 1954) was an Austrian Grand Prix motorcycle road racer who competed for the NSU factory racing team. He is the only Austrian to win a road racing World Championship, and the first racer to do so posthumously.

== Motorcycle racing career ==
Hollaus was born in Traisen, Austria. He began his Grand Prix racing career in the 1953 season. In the 1954 season, he dominated the 125cc class by winning the first four Grands Prix. His victory at the 1954 Isle of Man TT was notable because he was one of only seven riders to have won an Isle of Man TT race in their first attempt.

Later that same year, Hollaus was killed during practice for the Italian Grand Prix at Monza. Hollaus became the first posthumous World Champion in 1954, in the 125cc class and was runner up to his NSU teammate, Werner Haas, in the 250cc class.

On 23 February 1955, Hollaus was elected as "Austrian Sportspersonality of the year 1954" (posthum).

== Motorcycle Grand Prix results ==
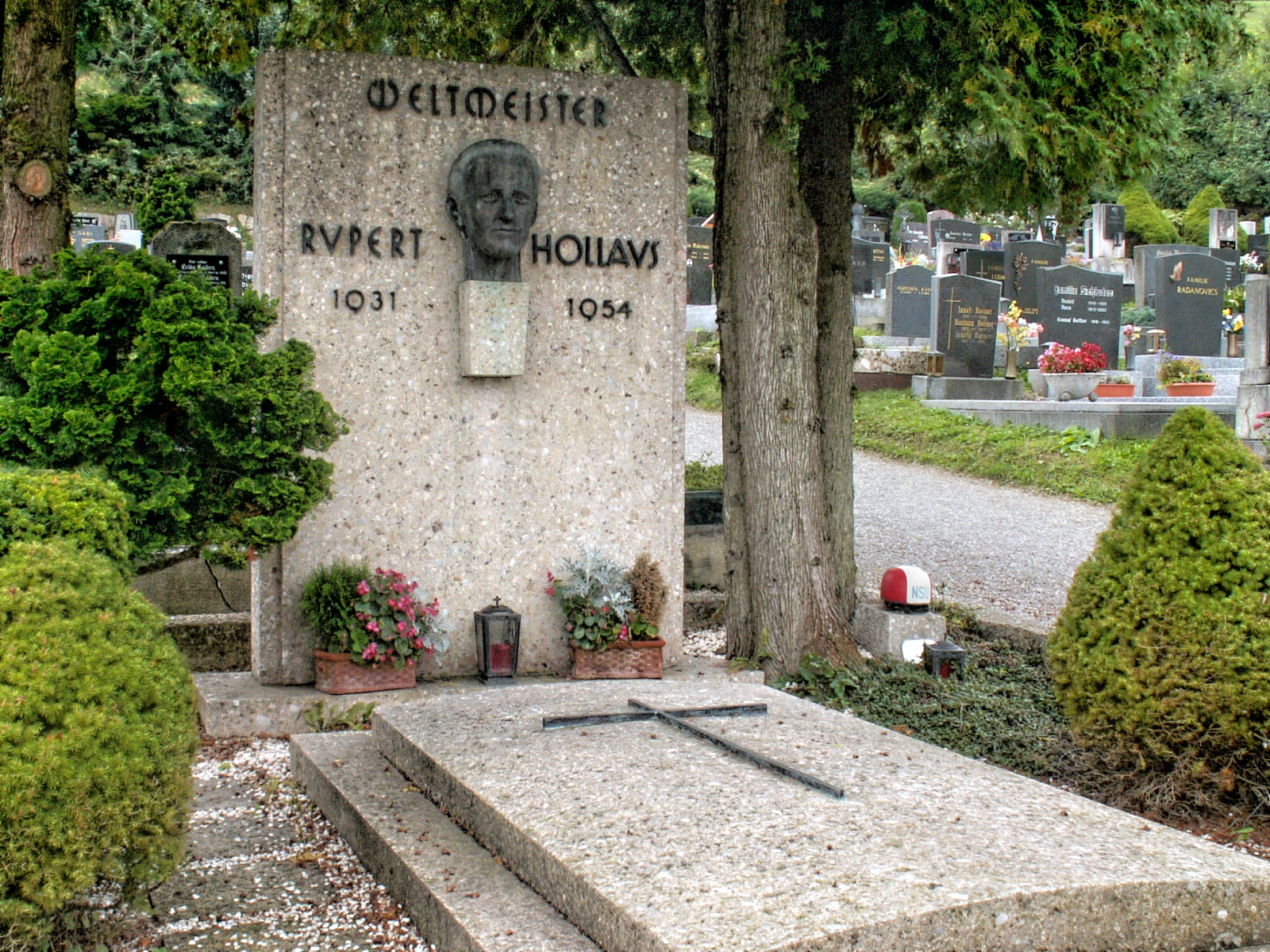
Rupert Hollaus grave at Traisen

Position	1	2	3	4	5	6
Points	8	6	4	3	2	1

(Races in italics indicate fastest lap)

Year	Class	Team	1	2	3	4	5	6	7	8	Points	Rank	Wins
1952	250cc	Moto Guzzi	SUI -	IOM -	NED -	GER; 9	ULS -	NAT; 17			0	—	0
1953	125cc	NSU	IOM -	NED -	GER -	ULS -		NAT -	ESP; 3		4	9th	0
1953	250cc	Moto Guzzi	IOM -	NED -	GER; 6	ULS -	SUI -	NAT -	ESP -		1	15th	0
1954	125cc	NSU		IOM; 1	ULS; 1	NED; 1	GER; 1		NAT -	ESP -	32	1st	4
1954	250cc	NSU	FRA; 3	IOM; 2	ULS -	NED; 2	GER; 2	SUI; 1	NAT -		26	2nd	1
