= Angelo Copeta =

Italian motorcycle racer (1919–1980)

- Nationality: Italian
Motorcycle racing career statistics
Grand Prix motorcycle racing
| Active years | 1952 - 1955 |
| First race | 1952 Isle of Man 125cc Ultra-Lightweight TT |
| Last race | 1955 125cc Nations Grand Prix |
| First win | 1953 125cc Spanish Grand Prix |
| Last win | 1953 125cc Spanish Grand Prix |
| Team | MV Agusta |
Starts / Wins / Podiums / Poles / F. laps / Points; 11 / 1 / 2 / N/A / N/A / 33

Angiolino Copeta (24 April 1919 – 1980) was an Italian Grand Prix motorcycle road racer. His best year was in 1953 when he won the Spanish Grand Prix and finished fourth in the 125cc world championship. He was born in Brescia on 24 April 1919, and died in 1980.

After retiring from competitions, Copeta was a dealer for ISO in Vigevano. Subsequently, between 1966 and 1972, he started a brand of light motorcycles named Rondine Copeta.

== Motorcycle Grand Prix results ==
| Colour | Result |
|---|---|
| Gold | Winner |
| Silver | Second place |
| Bronze | Third place |
| Green | Points classification |
| Blue | Non-points classification |
| Blue | Non-classified finish (NC) |
| Purple | Retired, not classified (Ret) |
| Red | Did not qualify (DNQ) |
| Red | Did not pre-qualify (DNPQ) |
| Black | Disqualified (DSQ) |
| White | Did not start (DNS) |
| White | Withdrew (WD) |
| White | Race cancelled (C) |
| Blank | Did not practice (DNP) |
| Blank | Did not arrive (DNA) |
| Blank | Excluded (EX) |

(Races in italics indicate the fastest lap)

| Year | Class | Motorcycle | 1 | 2 | 3 | 4 | 5 | 6 | 7 | 8 | 9 | Points | Rank | Wins |
|---|---|---|---|---|---|---|---|---|---|---|---|---|---|---|
| 1952 | 125 cc | MV Agusta 125 Bialbero | | IOM; 5 | NED; 5 | | GER; 4 | ULS - | NAT; DNF | ESP; DNF | | 7 | 7th | 0 |
| 1953 | 125 cc | MV Agusta 125 Bialbero | IOM; 4 | NED - | | GER; 4 | | ULS; DNF | | NAT; 4 | ESP; 1 | 17 | 4th | 1 |
| 1954 | 125 cc | MV Agusta 125 Bialbero | IOM - | ULS; 6 | NED - | GER - | NAT; DNF | ESP - | | | | 1 | 17th | 0 |
| 1955 | 125 cc | MV Agusta 125 Bialbero | ESP; 5 | FRA; 5 | IOM - | GER - | NED - | | NAT; 3 | | | 8 | 5th | 0 |

== Sources ==
- Angelo Copeta career statistics at MotoGP.com
