= Werner Haas =

German motorcycle racer (1927–1956)

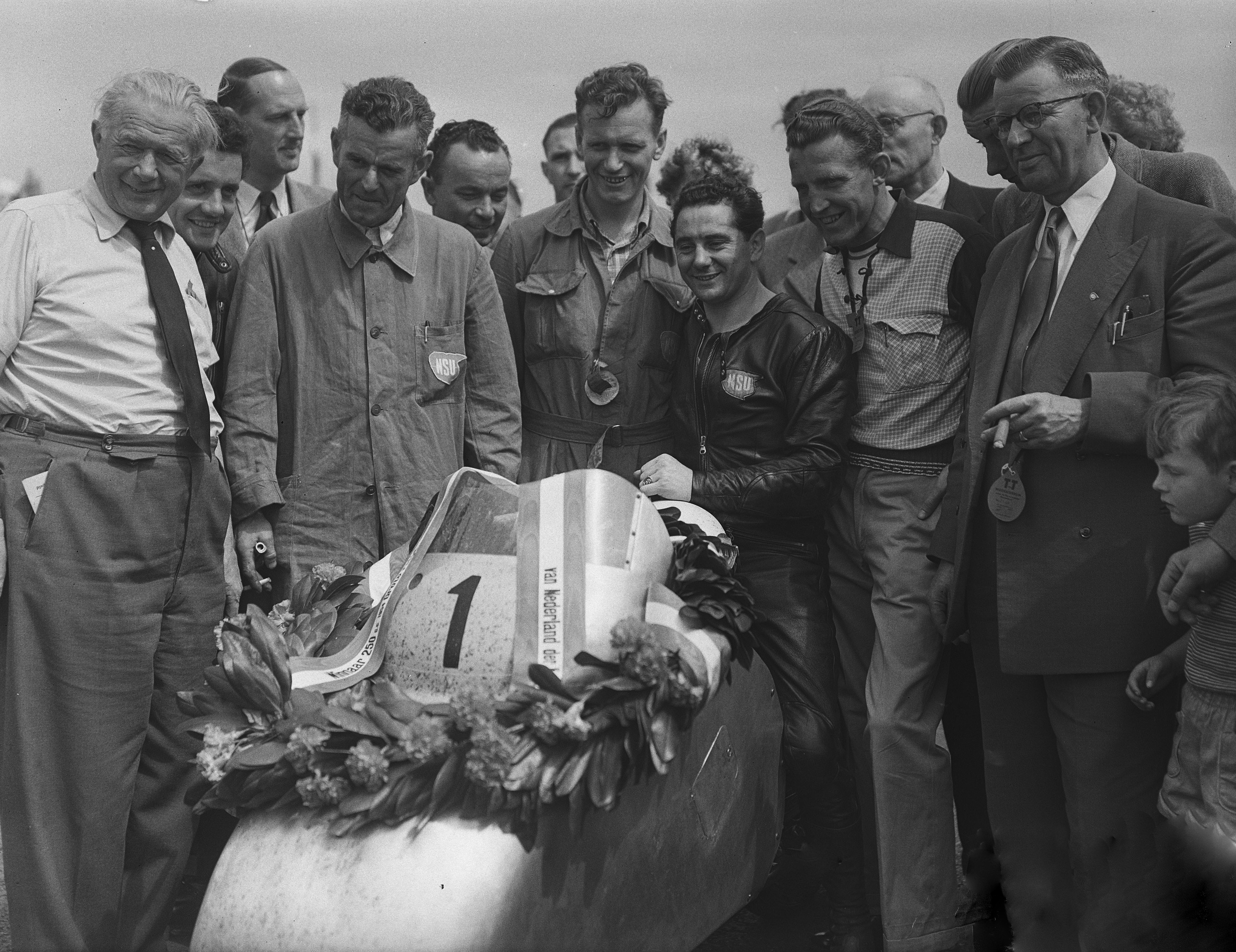
- Werner Haas after winning the 1954 Dutch TT 250cc race
- Nationality: German
- Born: 30 May 1927; Augsburg, Germany
- Died: 13 November 1956 (aged 29); Neuburg an der Donau, West Germany
Motorcycle racing career statistics
Grand Prix motorcycle racing
| Active years | 1952 – 1954 |
| First race | 1952 250cc West German Grand Prix |
| Last race | 1954 250cc West German Grand Prix |
| First win | 1952 250cc West German Grand Prix |
| Last win | 1954 250cc West German Grand Prix |
| Team | NSU |
| Championships | 125cc- 1953 250cc- 1953, 1954 |
Starts / Wins / Podiums / Poles / F. laps / Points; 21 / 11 / 18 / N/A / 11 / 115

Werner Haas (German pronunciation: [ˈvɛʁnɐ haːs]; 30 May 1927 – 13 November 1956) was a Grand Prix motorcycle road racer from Germany. He became Germany's first motorcycle world champion when he won the 1953 FIM 125 and 250 World Championship for NSU. The following year, he would repeat as the 250 world champion. Haas was killed in 1956 in a light plane accident in West Germany.

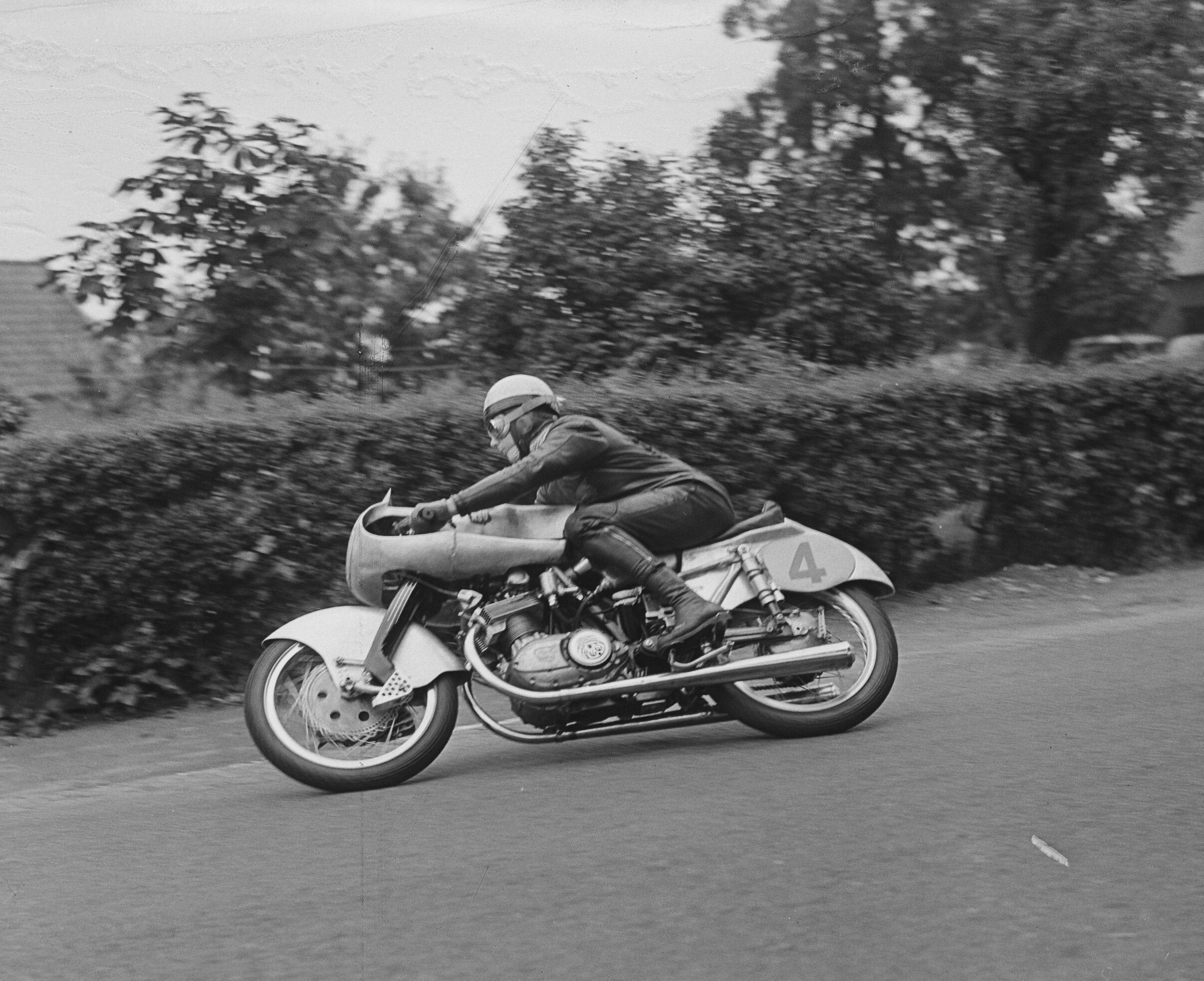
Haas en route to winning the 1953 250cc Dutch TT.

== Motorcycle Grand Prix results ==
| Position | 1 | 2 | 3 | 4 | 5 | 6 |
| Points | 8 | 6 | 4 | 3 | 2 | 1 |

(Races in italics indicate fastest lap)

| Year | Class | Team | 1 | 2 | 3 | 4 | 5 | 6 | 7 | 8 | Points | Rank | Wins |
|---|---|---|---|---|---|---|---|---|---|---|---|---|---|
| 1952 | 125cc | NSU | | IOM - | NED - | | GER; 1 | ULS - | NAT; 7 | ESP - | 8 | 6th | 1 |
| 1952 | 250cc | NSU | SUI - | IOM; 4 | NED - | BEL - | GER - | ULS - | NAT; 2 | | 6 | 7th | 0 |
| 1953 | 125cc | NSU | IOM; 2 | NED; 1 | GER; 2 | ULS; 1 | | NAT; 1 | ESP - | | 30 | 1st | 3 |
| 1953 | 250cc | NSU | IOM; 2 | NED; 1 | GER; 1 | ULS; 2 | SUI; 6 | NAT; 2 | ESP - | | 28 | 1st | 2 |
| 1954 | 125cc | NSU | | IOM - | ULS; 4 | NED; 5 | GER; 2 | | NAT - | ESP - | 11 | 5th | 0 |
| 1954 | 250cc | NSU | FRA; 1 | IOM; 1 | ULS; 1 | NED; 1 | GER; 1 | SUI - | NAT - | | 32 | 1st | 5 |

Awards
| Preceded by Karl Kling | German Sportsman of the Year; 1953 | Succeeded by Heinz Fütterer |
