= Jack Brett =

British motorcycle racer (1917–1982)

- Nationality: British
Motorcycle racing career statistics
Grand Prix motorcycle racing
Active years	1949 – 1960
First race	1949 Isle of Man TT 350cc Junior TT
Last race	1960 Isle of Man TT 500cc Senior TT
First win	1952 500cc Swiss Grand Prix
Last win	1952 500cc Swiss Grand Prix
Team	AJS
Championships	0
Starts / Wins / Podiums / Poles / F. laps / Points; 36 / 1 / 11 / 0 / 1 / 114

Jack Brett (17 June 1917 – 29 December 1982) was a British professional Grand Prix motorcycle road racer.

Brett was born in Leeds in the county of West Yorkshire, Northern England. He competed in the Grand Prix world championships from 1949 to 1960. He won his only world championship race in the 500cc class at the 1952 Swiss Grand Prix, riding an AJS. He was a two-time winner at the North West 200 race in Northern Ireland and finished on the podium four times at the Isle of Man TT. Brett completed the first-ever 100 mph lap of the North West 200 circuit in 1957.

== Motorcycle Grand Prix results ==
Position	1	2	3	4	5	6
Points	8	6	4	3	2	1

(Races in italics indicate fastest lap)

Year	Class	Team	1	2	3	4	5	6	7	8	9	Points	Rank	Wins
1949	350cc	Norton	IOM; 42	SUI -	NED -	BEL -	ULS -					0	–	0
1949	500cc	Norton	IOM; 30	SUI -	NED -	BEL -	ULS -	NAT -				0	–	0
1950	350cc	Norton	IOM; 15	BEL -	NED -	SUI -	ULS -	NAT -				0	–	0
1950	500cc	Norton	IOM; 9	BEL -	NED -	SUI -	ULS -	NAT -				0	–	0
1951	350cc	Norton	ESP -	SUI -	IOM; 3	BEL -	NED -	FRA; 2	ULS; 6	NAT; 3		15	5th	0
1951	500cc	Norton	ESP -	SUI -	IOM; NC	BEL; NC	NED; 5	FRA; 6	ULS -	NAT -		3	18th	0
1952	350cc	AJS	SUI; 4	IOM; NC	NED; 6	BEL; 4	GER -	ULS; 4	NAT; 4			12	6th	0
1952	500cc	AJS	SUI; 1	IOM; NC	NED; 9	BEL; 4	GER -	ULS; 4	NAT; 7	ESP -		14	5th	1
1953	350cc	Norton	IOM; 4	NED; 4	BEL; 4	GER -	FRA -	ULS -	SUI; 4	NAT -		12	5th	0
1953	500cc	Norton	IOM; 2	NED; 5	BEL -	GER -	FRA; 6	ULS; 3	SUI -	NAT -	ESP -	13	6th	0
1954	350cc	Norton	FRA -	IOM; NC	ULS; 2	BEL -	NED -	GER; 3	SUI; 4	NAT; 6	ESP -	14	6th	0
1954	500cc	Norton	FRA -	IOM; 3	ULS -	BEL -	NED -	GER; 6	SUI; 4	NAT -	ESP -	8	9th	0
1955	350cc	Norton	FRA -	IOM; NC	GER -	BEL -	NED -	ULS -	NAT -			0	–	0
1955	500cc	Norton	ESP -	FRA -	IOM; 4	GER -	BEL -	NED -	ULS -	NAT -		3	16th	0
1956	350cc	Norton	IOM; NC	NED -	BEL -	GER -	ULS; 4	NAT -				3	12th	0
1956	500cc	Norton	IOM; 3	NED -	BEL -	GER -	ULS; 6	NAT -				5	11th	0
1957	350cc	Norton	GER -	IOM; NC	NED; 4	BEL -	ULS -	NAT -				3	10th	0
1957	500cc	Norton	GER -	IOM; NC	NED; 4	BEL; 2	ULS -	NAT -				9	5th	0
1958	350cc	Norton	IOM; NC	NED -	BEL -	GER -	SWE -	ULS -	NAT -			0	–	0
1959	500cc	Norton	FRA -	IOM; NC	GER -	NED -	BEL -	ULS -	NAT -			0	–	0
1960	350cc	Norton	FRA -	IOM; 17	NED -			ULS -	NAT -			0	–	0
1960	500cc	Norton	FRA -	IOM; 23	NED -	BEL -	GER -	ULS -	NAT -			0	–	0
