= Ken Mudford =

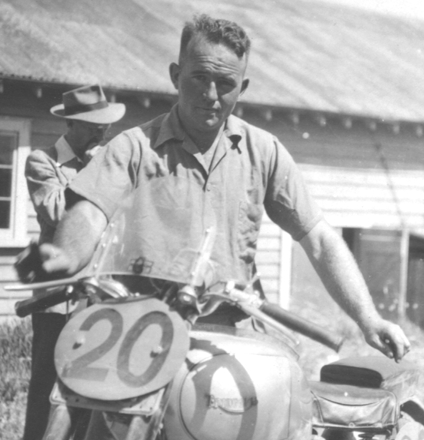
- Ken Mudford in 1950
- Nationality: New Zealand
Motorcycle racing career statistics
Grand Prix motorcycle racing
Active years	1951–1953
First race	1951 Isle of Man 350cc Junior TT
Last race	1953 500cc Ulster Grand Prix
First win	1953 350cc Ulster Grand Prix
Last win	1953 350cc Ulster Grand Prix
Starts / Wins / Podiums / Poles / F. laps / Points; 3 / 1 / 1 / N/A / N/A / 9

Ken Mudford (17 April 1923 – 17 May 2004) was a New Zealand professional Grand Prix motorcycle road racer. He competed in the FIM motorcycle Grand Prix world championships from 1951 to 1953 and was a member of the New Zealand team that competed in the Isle of Man tourist trophy races. Mudford is notable for winning the 350 class at the 1953 Ulster Grand Prix when the Norton factory racing team asked him to replace the injured Ray Amm. Mudford rode to victory ahead of AJS riders Bob McIntyre and Rod Coleman. In 1952, he was eighth in the Isle of Man Senior TT, and he was seventh in the Junior TT in 1953.
