= 1954 Grand Prix motorcycle racing season =

Sports season

1954 F.I.M. Grand Prix motorcycle racing season

Seasons
- ← 1953 1955 →

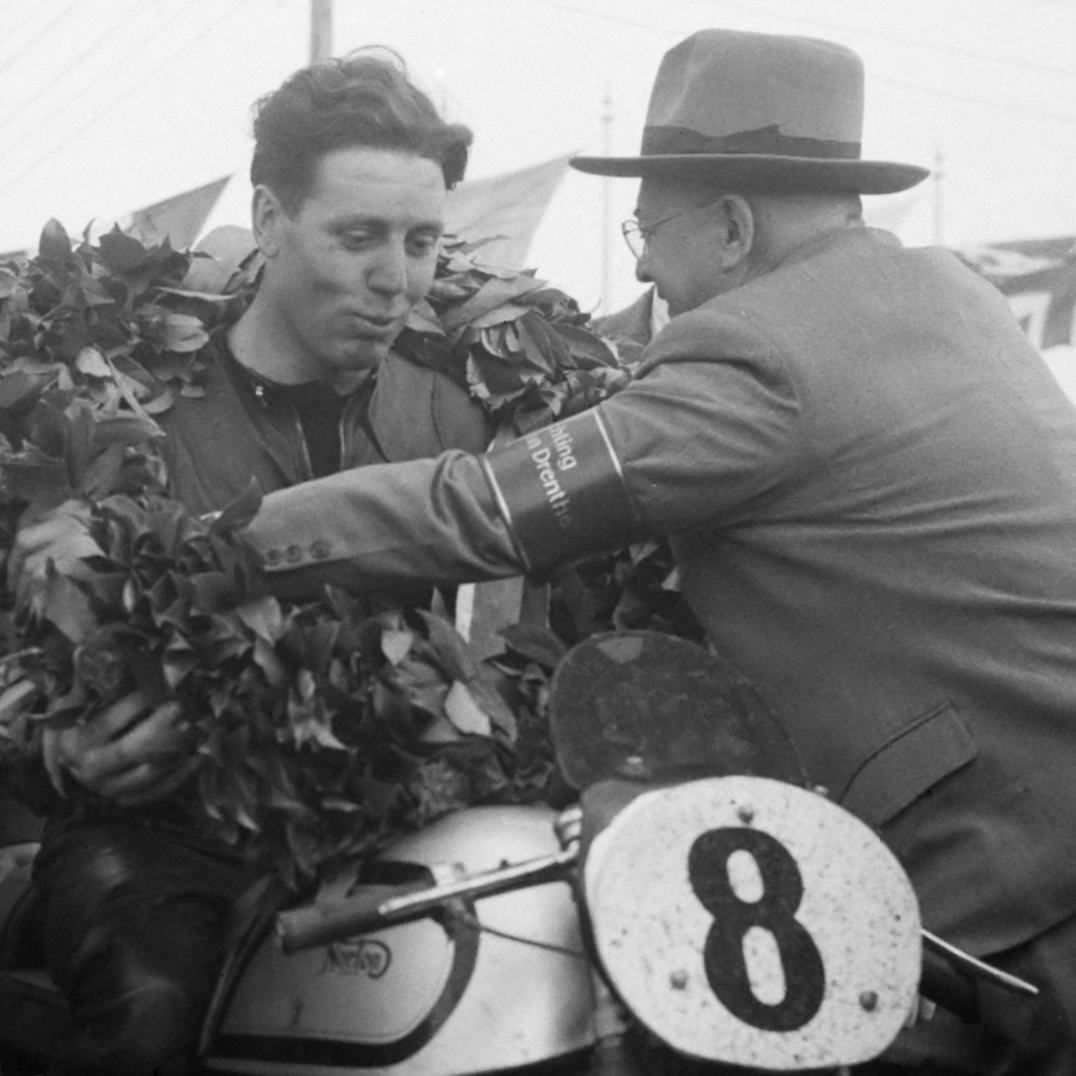
Geoff Duke (pictured in 1951) successfully defended his 500cc World Championship title in 1954.

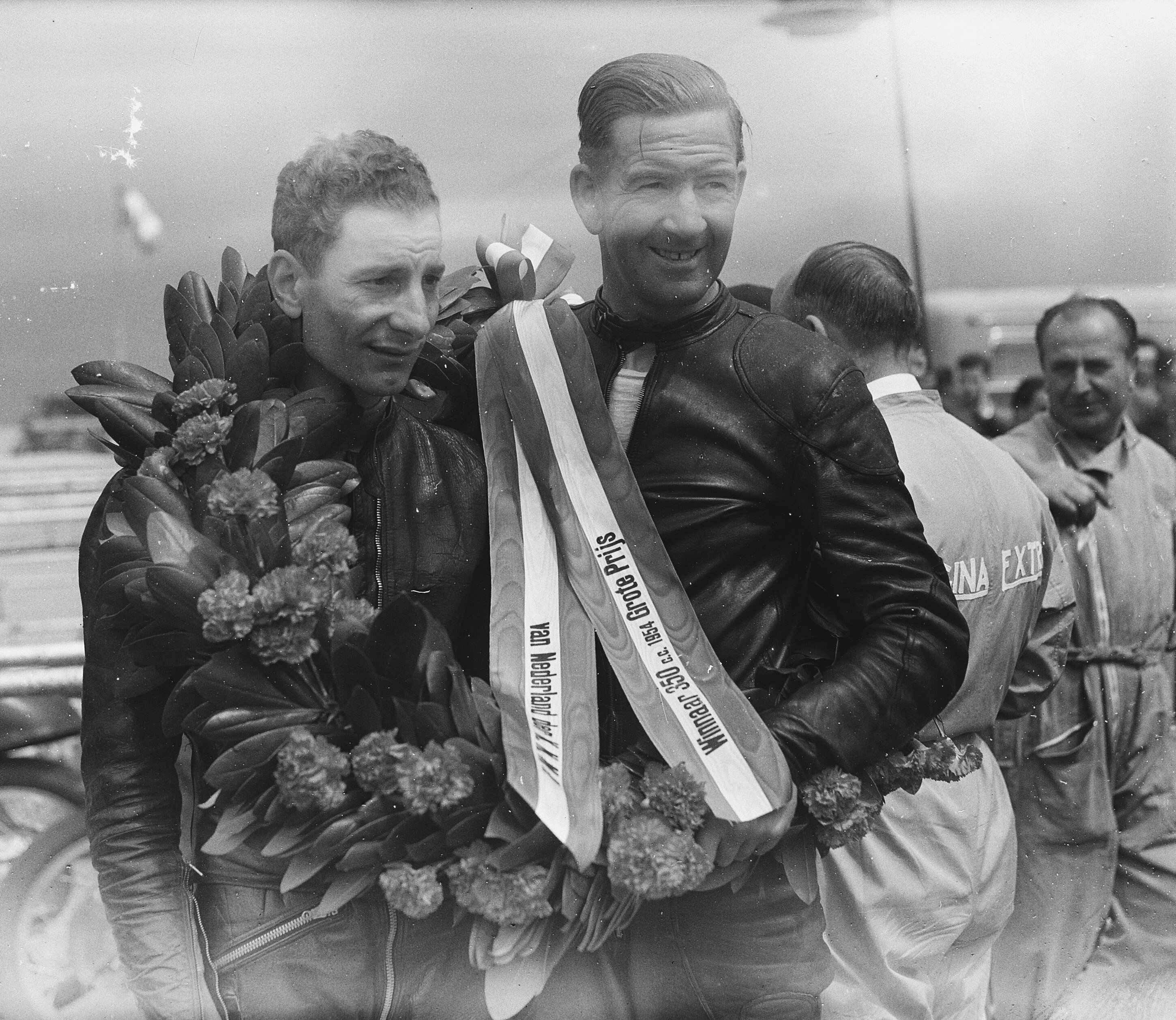
Fergus Anderson (right) successfully defended his 350cc World Championship title in 1954.

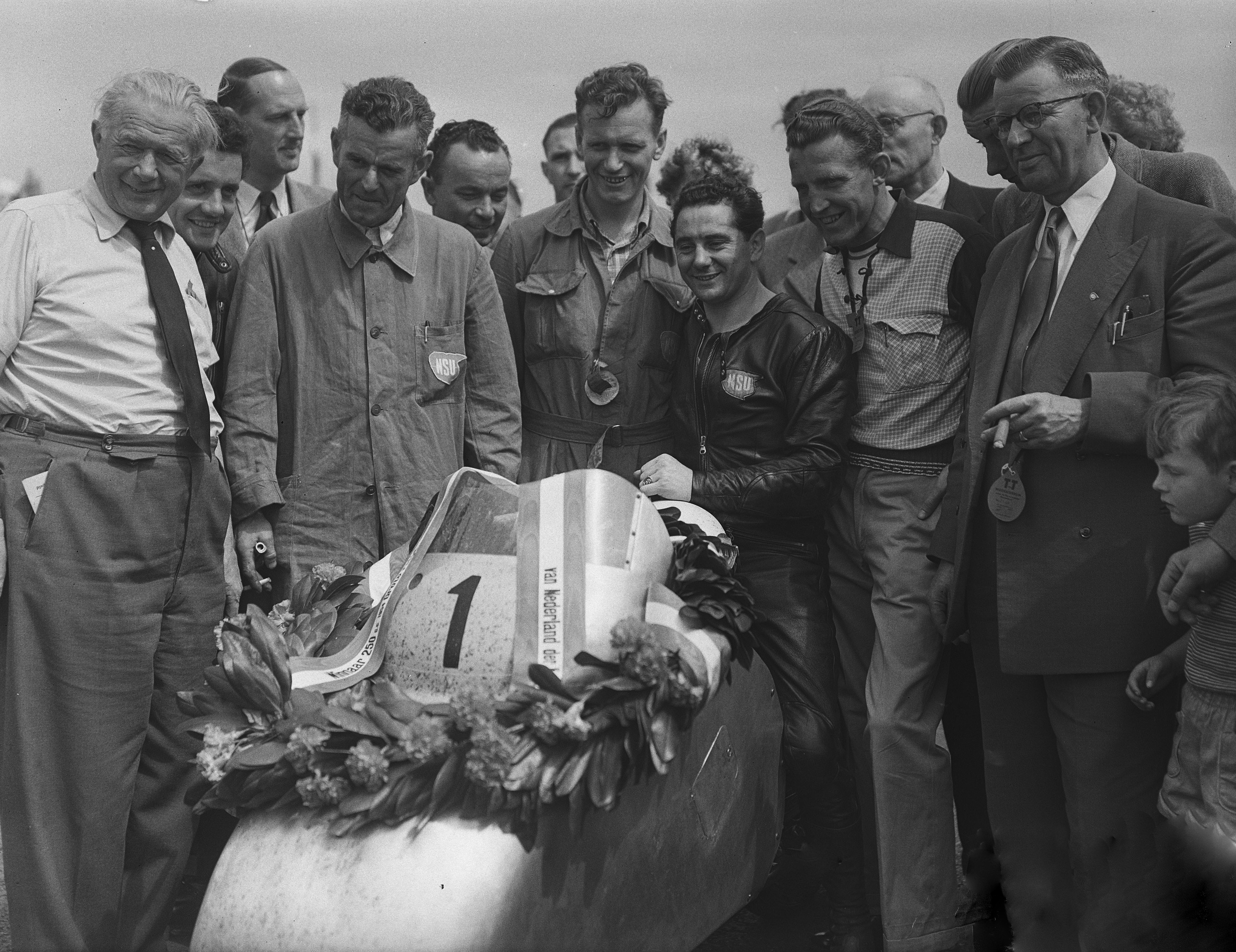
Werner Haas successfully defended his 250cc World Championship title in 1954.

The 1954 Grand Prix motorcycle racing season was the sixth F.I.M. Road Racing World Championship Grand Prix season. The season consisted of nine Grand Prix races in five classes: 500cc, 350cc, 250cc, 125cc and Sidecars 500cc. It began on 30 May, with French Grand Prix and ended with Spanish Grand Prix on 3 October.

The Constructors' titles for all classes were not recognized by the Federation following a political crisis with the constructors (represented by the International Permanent Bureau of Motorcycle Manufacturers) concerning the number of races to be held during the season and the abolition of the riders' championship.

== 1954 Grand Prix season calendar ==
Round	Date	Grand Prix	Circuit	125cc winner	250cc winner	350cc winner	500cc winner	Sidecars 500cc winner	Report
1	30 May	(France) French Grand Prix	Reims		(West Germany) Werner Haas	(France) Pierre Monneret	(France) Pierre Monneret		Report
2	18 June	Isle of Man TT	Snaefell Mountain††	(Austria) Rupert Hollaus	(West Germany) Werner Haas	(New Zealand) Rod Coleman	(Southern Rhodesia) Ray Amm	(United Kingdom) Oliver / Nutt	Report
3	26 June	(Northern Ireland) Ulster Grand Prix	Dundrod	(Austria) Rupert Hollaus	(West Germany) Werner Haas	(Southern Rhodesia) Ray Amm	(Southern Rhodesia) Ray Amm †	(United Kingdom) Oliver / Nutt	Report
4	4 July	(Belgium) Belgian Grand Prix	Spa-Francorchamps			(Australia) Ken Kavanagh	(United Kingdom) Geoff Duke	(United Kingdom) Oliver / Nutt	Report
5	10 July	(Netherlands) Dutch TT	Assen	(Austria) Rupert Hollaus	(West Germany) Werner Haas	(United Kingdom) Fergus Anderson	(United Kingdom) Geoff Duke		Report
6	25 July	(West Germany) German Grand Prix	Solitude	(Austria) Rupert Hollaus	(West Germany) Werner Haas	(Southern Rhodesia) Ray Amm	(United Kingdom) Geoff Duke	(West Germany) Noll / Cron	Report
7	22 August	(Switzerland) Swiss Grand Prix	Bremgarten		(Austria) Rupert Hollaus	(United Kingdom) Fergus Anderson	(United Kingdom) Geoff Duke	(West Germany) Noll / Cron	Report
8	12 September	(Italy) Nations Grand Prix	Monza	(Italy) Guido Sala	(United Kingdom) Arthur Wheeler	(United Kingdom) Fergus Anderson	(United Kingdom) Geoff Duke	(West Germany) Noll / Cron	Report
9	3 October	(Spain) Spanish Grand Prix	Montjuïc	(Italy) Tarquinio Provini		(United Kingdom) Fergus Anderson	(United Kingdom) Dickie Dale		Report

† The 500 cc race was stopped by bad weather, and the FIM excluded the race from the World Championship.

†† The Sidecars and 125cc races were held on the 10.6-mile (17.364) km long Clypse Course other than the usual 37 mile (62 km) Snaefell mountain course.

== Standings ==
=== Scoring system ===
Points were awarded to the top six finishers in each race. Only the four best races counted in the Sidecars, 125cc and 250cc, while in the 350cc and 500cc championships, the five best results were counted.

Position	1st	2nd	3rd	4th	5th	6th
Points	8	6	4	3	2	1

==== 500cc final standings ====
Pos	Rider	Machine	FRA (France)	IOM (Isle of Man)	BEL (Belgium)	HOL (Netherlands)	GER (Germany)	SUI (Switzerland)	NAC (Italy)	ESP (Spain)	Pts
1	(United Kingdom) Geoff Duke	Gilera	12	2	1	**1**	1	1	1		**40** (46)
2	(Federation of Rhodesia and Nyasaland) Ray Amm	Norton		1	Ret	Ret	2	2	7		**20**
3	(Australia) Ken Kavanagh	Moto Guzzi		Ret	2	Ret	4	Ret	6	2	**16**
4	(United Kingdom) Dickie Dale	MV Agusta		7		5	20		4	1	**13**
5	(Republic of Ireland) Reg Armstrong	Gilera	Ret	4	Ret	Ret	3	3	5		**13**
6	(France) Pierre Monneret	Gilera	**1**		Ret			7	Ret		**8**
7	(United Kingdom) Fergus Anderson	Moto Guzzi		Ret	Ret	2	5	Ret	7	Ret	**8**
8	(Italy) Carlo Bandirola	MV Agusta				3	Ret		3	**Ret**	**8**
9	(United Kingdom) Jack Brett	Norton		3			6	4	11		**8**
10	(Italy) Umberto Masetti	Gilera							**2**		**6**
=	(Italy) Alfredo Milani	Gilera	2								**6**
12	(New Zealand) Rod Coleman	AJS		Ret	Ret	4	8	5	Ret		**5**
13	(Italy) Nello Pagani	MV Agusta				7			12	3	**4**
14	(France) Jacques Collot	Norton	3								**4**
=	(Belgium) Léon Martin	Gilera			3						**4**
16	(United Kingdom) Bob McIntyre	AJS		14	4	6	7	Ret			**4**
17	(Switzerland) Luigi Taveri	Norton / MV Agusta	4					9	10	Ret	**3**
18	(Isle of Wight) Tommy Wood	Norton								4	**3**
19	(Belgium) Auguste Goffin	Norton	Ret		9					5	**2**
20	(Northern Ireland) Bob Matthews	Norton	5		13	14	19			10	**2**
21	(Australia) Keith Campbell	Norton			5	Ret					**2**
22	(South Africa) Rudy Allison	Norton		5							**2**
23	(United Kingdom) Harold Clark	Norton		Ret	8					6	**1**
24	(United Kingdom) Cyril Julian	Norton	6	48			14				**1**
25	(New Zealand) Peter Murphy	Matchless		18	6	Ret					**1**
26	(United Kingdom) Derek Farrant	AJS		Ret			Ret	6			**1**
27	(Australia) Gordon Laing	Norton		6							**1**
28	(Australia) Jack Ahearn	Norton		9	7	9	12		Ret		**0**
29	(Spain) Alfredo Flores	Norton	Ret							7	**0**
30	(France) Pierre Cherrier	Norton	7								**0**
31	(New Zealand) Leo Simpson	Norton / AJS / Matchless		12	Ret	Ret	9	8			**0**
32	(United Kingdom) Joe Glazebrook	Norton		34						8	**0**
33	(United Kingdom) Bob Keeler	Norton		8		Ret					**0**
=	(United Kingdom) Bill Lomas	MV Agusta		Ret					8		**0**
35	(New Zealand) Barrie Stormont	BSA	8								**0**
=	(Netherlands) Drikus Veer	Gilera				8					**0**
37	(Germany) Rudolf Knees	BMW / Norton					16			9	0
38	(France) Roland Gauch	AJS	9								0
39	(Australia) Maurice Quincey	Norton		10	Ret	10	10				**0**
40	(United Kingdom) Dennis Lashmar	BSA		21	10	Ret	Ret				**0**
41	(Germany) Hans Bartl	BMW						10			**0**
=	(Germany) Bruno Böhrer	Horex	10								**0**
43	(Netherlands) Piet Knijnenburg	BMW				11	11				**0**
44	(United Kingdom) Phil Heath	AJS / Norton		Ret	11	Ret	Ret	Ret			0
45	(United Kingdom) Peter Davey	Norton		11		Ret					0
46	(Switzerland) Florian Camathias	BMW						11			**0**
=	(United Kingdom) Barry Haynes	BSA	11								**0**
48	(Belgium) Raoul Gerrebos	Norton			12		13				**0**
49	(Northern Ireland) Mike O'Rourke	Norton		46		12					**0**
50	(Germany) Walter Zeller	BMW					Ret		13		**0**
51	(Netherlands) Piet Bakker	Norton				13					**0**
=	(Australia) Keith Bryen	Norton		13							**0**
53	(United Kingdom) Tom McCleary	Matchless			14	Ret					**0**
54	(Italy) Tito Forconi	Gilera							14		**0**
55	(Germany) Alois Huber	Norton					15				**0**
=	(Netherlands) Lodewijk Simons	Matchless				15					**0**
=	(United Kingdom) John Surtees	Norton		15							**0**
58	(Northern Ireland) Peter Carter	Norton		16							**0**
59	(Netherlands) Cees Van Burik	Norton				16					**0**
60	(Canada) Roy Godwin	Norton	Ret	17				Ret			**0**
61	(Netherlands) Jaap Iesberts	Matchless				17					**0**
=	(Germany) Karl Kronmüller	BMW					17				**0**
63	(East Germany) Edgar Barth	Norton					18				**0**
=	(Sweden) Evert Carlsson	Norton				18					**0**
65	(United Kingdom) Bill Beevers	Norton		29		19					**0**
66	(United Kingdom) Roy Ingram	Norton		19							**0**
67	(United Kingdom) George Morgan	Norton				20					**0**
=	(United Kingdom) George Salt	Matchless		20							**0**
69	(Germany) Karl-Julius Holthaus	Triumph					21				**0**
70	(United Kingdom) Charlie Salt	BSA		22							**0**
71	(United Kingdom) Bob Rowbottom	Norton		23							**0**
72	(United Kingdom) Syd Barnett	Matchless		24							**0**
73	(Sweden) Ulf Gate	Norton		25							**0**
74	(United Kingdom) Albert Moule	Norton		26							**0**
75	(United Kingdom) Don Williams	Norton		27							**0**
76	(United Kingdom) Arthur Wheeler	AJS		28							**0**
77	(United Kingdom) Roy Walker	BSA		30							**0**
78	(Northern Ireland) Malcolm Templeton	Matchless		31							**0**
79	(United Kingdom) Terry Shepherd	AJS		32							**0**
80	(United Kingdom) Eric Pantlin	Norton		33							**0**
81	(United Kingdom) Arnold Jones	Matchless		35							**0**
82	(United Kingdom) Jimmy Lanyon	Matchless		36							**0**
83	(Canada) Edward Havens	AJS		37							**0**
84	(United Kingdom) Frank Fox	Norton		38							**0**
85	(United Kingdom) John Clark	Matchless		39							**0**
86	(United Kingdom) Harry Pearce	Matchless		40							**0**
87	(United Kingdom) Roy Smith	Velocette		41							**0**
88	(United Kingdom) Eric Jones	Norton		42							**0**
89	(United Kingdom) Ray Fay	Norton		43							**0**
90	(United Kingdom) Robert King	Norton		44							**0**
91	(United Kingdom) Cliff Carr	AJS		45							**0**
92	(United Kingdom) Ken Swallow	Matchless		47							**0**
93	(United Kingdom) Ken Willis	AJS		49							**0**
94	(United Kingdom) Louis Gilbert	AJS		50							**0**
95	(United Kingdom) Ernie Barrett	Norton		51							**0**
96	(Crown Colony of North Borneo) William Cleugh	Norton		52							**0**
97	(United Kingdom) Ron Rudge	Matchless		53							**0**
–	(Germany) Georg Braun	Horex			Ret			Ret	Ret	Ret	**0**
–	(United Kingdom) John Storr	Norton				Ret	Ret	Ret		Ret	**0**
–	(Belgium) Firmin Dauwe	Norton	Ret					Ret			**0**
–	(Dominion of Ceylon) Rally Dean	Norton	Ret				Ret				**0**
–	(United Kingdom) Stanley Dibben	Norton		Ret			Ret				**0**
–	(Morocco) Francis Flahaut	BMW / Norton	Ret						Ret		0
–	(Gibraltar) John Grace	Norton		Ret						Ret	**0**
–	(United Kingdom) Eric Houseley	AJS / Norton		Ret		Ret					0
–	(Italy) Alano Montanari	Moto Guzzi				Ret			Ret		0
–	(Italy) Duilio Agostini	Moto Guzzi								Ret	0
–	(France) Jean-Pierre Bayle	Norton	Ret								**0**
–	(Italy) Dante Bianchi	Moto Guzzi							Ret		**0**
–	(Federation of Rhodesia and Nyasaland) Cyril Blacker	AJS		Ret							**0**
–	(United Kingdom) Jack Bottomley	Norton		Ret							**0**
–	(Belgium) Charles Bruguiere	AJS	Ret								**0**
–	(France) Georges Burgraff	Norton							Ret		**0**
–	(Italy) Paolo Campanelli	Gilera							Ret		**0**
–	(United Kingdom) Roly Capner	BSA		Ret							**0**
–	(United Kingdom) Louis Carr	Matchless		Ret							**0**
–	(Spain) Antonio Creus	Norton								Ret	**0**
–	(United Kingdom) Les Dear	Norton		Ret							**0**
–	(Switzerland) René del Torchio	Matchless						Ret			**0**
–	(United Kingdom) Brian Duffy	Norton	Ret								**0**
–	(Netherlands) Anton Elbersen	Matchless				Ret					**0**
–	(United Kingdom) Roy Evans	Matchless		Ret							**0**
–	(Italy) Lodovico Facchinelli	Gilera							Ret		**0**
–	(Italy) Dino Fagiolini	Moto Guzzi							Ret		**0**
–	(United Kingdom) Arthur Fenn	Norton						Ret			**0**
–	(United Kingdom) John Fisher	Matchless		Ret							**0**
–	(United Kingdom) Robin Fitton	Velocette	Ret								**0**
–	(United Kingdom) Ted Frend	Norton		Ret							**0**
–	(Italy) Enrico Galante	Norton							Ret		**0**
–	(Spain) Francisco González	Clua								Ret	**0**
–	(Italy) Francis Guglielminetti	Norton							Ret		**0**
–	(Switzerland) Hans Haldemann	Norton	Ret								**0**
–	(United Kingdom) William Hall	Norton	Ret								**0**
–	(United Kingdom) Edward Hunt	Norton		Ret							**0**
–	(Germany) Peter Knees	BMW								Ret	**0**
–	(United Kingdom) Arthur Lavington	Velocette		Ret							**0**
–	(United Kingdom) George Leigh	Norton		Ret							**0**
–	(Italy) Libero Liberati	Gilera							Ret		**0**
–	(Italy) Enrico Lorenzetti	Moto Guzzi			Ret						**0**
–	(United Kingdom) Frank Norris	FAN		Ret							**0**
–	(Netherlands) Gerard Poel	Matchless				Ret					**0**
–	(United Kingdom) Brian Purslow	BSA		Ret							**0**
–	(Germany) Ernst Riedelbauch	Norton					Ret				**0**
–	(Italy) Antonio Ronchei	Norton							Ret		**0**
–	(United Kingdom) Simon Sandys-Winsch	Velocette		Ret							**0**
–	(Germany) Roland Schnell	Horex			Ret						**0**
–	(Italy) Otello Spadoni	Gilera						Ret			**0**
–	(Germany) Heinrich Thorn-Prikker	Moto Guzzi				Ret					**0**
–	(United Kingdom) Ken Tostevin	Matchless		Ret							**0**
–	(United Kingdom) Dave Tutty	Norton		Ret							**0**
–	(Austria) Helmut Volzwinkler	Matchless						Ret			**0**
–	(Germany) Gerrit Von Woedkte	Norton					Ret				**0**
–	(Canada) Ivor Wagar	Norton		Ret							**0**
–	(Germany) Robert Zeller	BMW					Ret				**0**
Pos	Pilot	Moto	FRA (France)	MAN (United Kingdom)	BEL (Belgium)	HOL (Netherlands)	GER (Germany)	SUI (Switzerland)	NAC (Italy)	ESP (Spain)	Pts

Colour	Result
Gold	Winner
Silver	Second place
Bronze	Third place
Green	Points classification
Blue	Non-points classification
Blue	Non-classified finish (NC)
Purple	Retired, not classified (Ret)
Red	Did not qualify (DNQ)
Red	Did not pre-qualify (DNPQ)
Black	Disqualified (DSQ)
White	Did not start (DNS)
White	Withdrew (WD)
White	Race cancelled (C)
Blank	Did not practice (DNP)
Blank	Did not arrive (DNA)
Blank	Excluded (EX)

**Bold** – Pole
Italics – Fastest Lap

=== 350cc Standings ===
Place	Rider	Number	Country	Machine	Points	Wins
1	(United Kingdom) Fergus Anderson		United Kingdom	Moto Guzzi	38	4
2	(Federation of Rhodesia and Nyasaland) Ray Amm		Rhodesia	Norton	22	2
3	(New Zealand) Rod Coleman	33	New Zealand	AJS	20	1
4	(Australia) Ken Kavanagh		Australia	Moto Guzzi	18	1
5	(Italy) Enrico Lorenzetti		Italy	Moto Guzzi	15	0
6	(United Kingdom) Jack Brett		United Kingdom	Norton	14	0
7	(Italy) Duilio Agostini		Italy	Moto Guzzi	9	0
8	(United Kingdom) Bob McIntyre		United Kingdom	AJS	9	0
9	(New Zealand) Leo Simpson		New Zealand	AJS	9	0
10	(France) Pierre Monneret		France	AJS	8	1
11	(Belgium) Auguste Goffin		Belgium	Norton	7	0
12	(United Kingdom) Derek Farrant		United Kingdom	AJS	6	0
13	(United Kingdom) Bob Matthews		United Kingdom	Velocette	6	0
14	(Gibraltar) Johnny Grace		Gibraltar	Norton	4	0
=	(West Germany) Sigfried Wünsche		Germany	DKW	4	0
=	(United Kingdom) Bob Keeler		United Kingdom	Norton	4	0
17	(West Germany) Georg Braun		Germany	NSU	4	0
=	(Australia) Maurice Quincey		Australia	Norton	4	0
19	(France) Jacques Collot		France	Norton	3	0
=	(Australia) Gordon Laing		Australia	Norton	3	0
21	(West Germany) Karl Hofmann		Germany	DKW	2	0
=	(United Kingdom) Peter Davey		United Kingdom	Norton	2	0
=	(New Zealand) Barry Stormont		New Zealand	BSA	2	0
24	(Italy) Alano Montanari		Italy	Moto Guzzi	1	0
=	(United Kingdom) John Clark		United Kingdom	AJS	1	0
=	(Belgium) Firmin Dauwe		Belgium	Norton	1	0

=== 250cc Standings ===
Place	Rider	Number	Country	Machine	Points	Wins
1	(West Germany) Werner Haas		Germany	NSU	32	5
2	(Austria) Rupert Hollaus		Austria	NSU	26	1
3	(West Germany) Hermann Paul Müller		Germany	NSU	17	0
4	(United Kingdom) Arthur Wheeler		United Kingdom	Moto Guzzi	15	1
5	(West Germany) Hans Baltisberger		Germany	NSU	14	0
6	(West Germany) Georg Braun		Germany	NSU	6	0
=	(Italy) Romolo Ferri		Italy	Moto Guzzi	6	0
8	(Italy) Roberto Colombo		Italy	Moto Guzzi	5	0
9	(United Kingdom) Reg Armstrong		United Kingdom	NSU	4	0
=	(West Germany) Helmut Hallmeier		Germany	Adler	4	0
=	(West Germany) Kurt Knopf		Germany	NSU	4	0
12	(United Kingdom) Tommy Wood		United Kingdom	Moto Guzzi	4	0
13	(Australia) Ken Kavanagh		Australia	Moto Guzzi	3	0
=	(Switzerland) Luigi Taveri		Switzerland	Moto Guzzi	3	0
15	(United Kingdom) Fergus Anderson		United Kingdom	Moto Guzzi	2	0
=	(West Germany) Walter Reichert		Germany	NSU	2	0
=	(United Kingdom) JG Horne		United Kingdom	Rudge	2	0
18	(West Germany) Walter Vogel		Germany	Adler	2	0
19	(Italy) Lanfranco Baviera		Italy	Moto Guzzi	1	0
=	(United Kingdom) Bob Geeson		United Kingdom	REG	1	0
=	(Italy) Angelo Marelli		Italy	Moto Guzzi	1	0

=== 125cc riders' standings ===
Pos.	Rider	Bike	MAN (United Kingdom)	ULS (Ulster)	NED (Netherlands)	GER (Germany)	NAT (Italy)	ESP (Spain)	Pts
1	(Austria) Rupert Hollaus	NSU	1**^{F}**	1	1**^{F}**	1**^{F}**	DNS		32
2	(Italy) Carlo Ubbiali	MV Agusta	2	NC**^{F}**	3	3	3**^{F}**	NC**^{F}**	18
3	(West Germany) Hermann Paul Müller	NSU		2	2	4			15
4	(Italy) Tarquinio Provini	Mondial					2	1	14
5	(West Germany) Werner Haas	NSU		4	5	2			11
6	(West Germany) Hans Baltisberger	NSU	4	3	4				10
7	(Italy) Guido Sala	MV Agusta					1		8
8	(United Kingdom) Cecil Sandford	MV Agusta	3	5		5			8
9	(Italy) Roberto Colombo	MV Agusta						2	6
10	(Spain) José Antonio Elizalde	Montesa						3	4
11	(Italy) Massimo Genevini	MV Agusta					4		3
11	(Spain) Juan Bertrand	Montesa						4	3
13	(United Kingdom) Ivor Lloyd	MV Agusta	5						2
13	(Italy) Franco Bertoni	MV Agusta					5		2
13	(Spain) Arturo Paragues	Lube						5	2
16	(West Germany) Karl Lottes	MV Agusta			6	6			2
17	(United Kingdom) Brian Purslow	MV Agusta	6						1
17	(Italy) Angelo Copeta	MV Agusta		6					1
17	(West Germany) Willi Scheidhauer	MV Agusta					6		1
17	(Spain) Gabriel Corsin	MV Agusta						6	1
Pos.	Rider	Bike	MAN (United Kingdom)	ULS (Ulster)	NED (Netherlands)	GER (Germany)	NAT (Italy)	ESP (Spain)	Pts

Race key
Colour	Result
Gold	Winner
Silver	2nd place
Bronze	3rd place
Green	Points finish
Blue	Non-points finish
Blue	Non-classified finish (NC)
Purple	Retired (Ret)
Red	Did not qualify (DNQ)
Black	Disqualified (DSQ)
White	Did not start (DNS)
White	Withdrew (WD)
White	Race cancelled (C)
Blank	Did not practice (DNP)
Blank	Excluded (EX)
Blank	Did not arrive (DNA)
Blank	Did not enter (empty cell)
Annotation	Meaning
P	Pole position
F	Fastest lap
Rider key
Colour	Meaning
Light blue	Rookie rider
