= 1952 Nations motorcycle Grand Prix =

(Italy) 1952 Nations Grand Prix
Race details
- Race 7 of 8 races in the 1952 Grand Prix motorcycle racing season
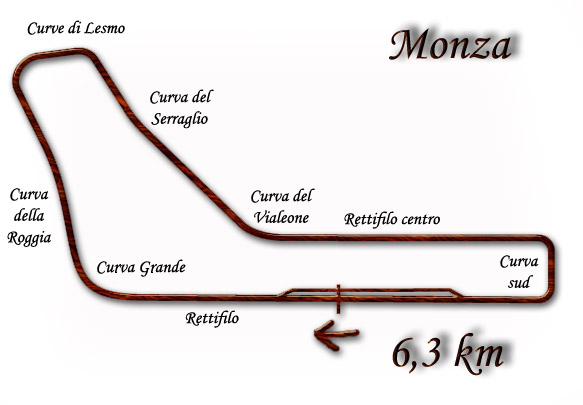
- Date: 14 September 1952
- Location: Autodromo Nazionale Monza
- Course: Permanent racing facility; 6.292 km (3.910 mi)

500cc
- Rider
Fastest lap
Rider	(United Kingdom) Leslie Graham	MV Agusta
Time	2:10.3	
Podium
First	(United Kingdom) Leslie Graham	MV Agusta
Second	(Italy) Umberto Masetti	Gilera
Third	(Italy) Nello Pagani	Gilera

350cc
- Rider
Fastest lap
Rider	(Southern Rhodesia) Ray Amm	Norton
Time	2:19.8	
Podium
First	(Southern Rhodesia) Ray Amm	Norton
Second	(New Zealand) Rod Coleman	AJS
Third	(United Kingdom) Robin Sherry	AJS

250cc
- Rider
Fastest lap
Rider	(West Germany) Werner Haas (Italy) Enrico Lorenzetti	NSU; Moto Guzzi
Time	2:27.5	
Podium
First	(Italy) Enrico Lorenzetti	Moto Guzzi
Second	(West Germany) Werner Haas	NSU
Third	(United Kingdom) Fergus Anderson	Moto Guzzi

125cc
- Rider
Fastest lap
Rider	(Italy) Guido Sala	MV Agusta
Time	2:43.4	
Podium
First	(Italy) Emilio Mendogni	Moto Morini
Second	(Italy) Carlo Ubbiali	Mondial
Third	(United Kingdom) Leslie Graham	MV Agusta

Sidecar (B2A)
- Rider
Fastest lap
Rider	(Italy) Ernesto Merlo	Gilera
Time	2:31.2	
Podium
First	(Italy) Ernesto Merlo	Gilera
Second	(United Kingdom) Cyril Smith	Norton
Third	(Italy) Albino Milani	Gilera

The 1952 Nations motorcycle Grand Prix was the seventh round of the 1952 Grand Prix motorcycle racing season. It took place on 14 September 1952 at the Autodromo Nazionale Monza.

== 500 cc classification ==
Pos	Rider	Manufacturer	Laps	Time	Points
1	(United Kingdom) Leslie Graham	MV Agusta	32	1:10:40.3	8
2	(Italy) Umberto Masetti	Gilera	32	+58.4	6
3	(Italy) Nello Pagani	Gilera	32	+59.0	4
4	(Italy) Carlo Bandirola	MV Agusta			3
5	(Italy) Giuseppe Colnago	Gilera			2
6	(Republic of Ireland) Reg Armstrong	Norton			1
7	(United Kingdom) Jack Brett	AJS			
8	(Italy) Libero Liberati	Gilera			
9	(United Kingdom) Robin Sherry	AJS			
10	(Italy) Martino Giani	MV Agusta			
11	(Italy) Enrico Galante	Norton			
12	(Italy) Francesco Guglielminetti	MV Agusta			
13	(Spain) Javier de Ortueta	Norton			

== 350 cc classification ==
Pos	Rider	Manufacturer	Laps	Time	Points
1	(Southern Rhodesia) Ray Amm	Norton	24	57:43.6	8
2	(New Zealand) Rod Coleman	AJS	24	+31.5	6
3	(United Kingdom) Robin Sherry	AJS	24	+31.6	4
4	(United Kingdom) Jack Brett	AJS			3
5	(Belgium) Auguste Goffin	Norton			2
6	(West Germany) Roland Schnell	Horex			1
7	(United Kingdom) Charles Bruguière	AJS			
8	(United Kingdom) Sid Mason	Velocette			
9	(Switzerland) Arthur Wick	AJS			
10	(United Kingdom) Guy Newman	Velocette			
11	(Austria) Leopold Zöchling	AJS			
12	Whelan	Norton			
13	(United Kingdom) Norman Webb	Velocette			

== 250 cc classification ==
Pos	Rider	Manufacturer	Laps	Time	Points
1	(Italy) Enrico Lorenzetti	Moto Guzzi	20	50:07.2	8
2	(West Germany) Werner Haas	NSU	20	+0.0	6
3	(United Kingdom) Fergus Anderson	Moto Guzzi	20	+1.0	4
4	(Italy) Alano Montanari	Moto Guzzi			3
5	(Italy) Roberto Colombo	NSU			2
6	(Italy) Bruno Francisci	Moto Guzzi			1
7	(West Germany) Hermann Gablenz	Horex			
8	(Italy) Ermano Ozino	Moto Guzzi			
9	(Italy) Felice Benasedo	Moto Guzzi			
10	(West Germany) Bruno Böhrer	Parilla			
11	(Italy) Guido Paciocca	Moto Guzzi			
12	A. Nowe	Parilla			
13	Braun	Parilla			
14	(West Germany) Gotthilf Gehring	Moto Guzzi			
15	(Italy) Lanfranco Baviera	Moto Guzzi			
16	(Italy) Angelo Marelli	Moto Guzzi			
17	(Austria) Rupert Hollaus	Moto Guzzi			
18	(United Kingdom) Bill Webster	Velocette			
19	(Italy) Adelmo Mandolini	Moto Guzzi			
20	(United Kingdom) Guy Newman	Rudge			
21	(United Kingdom) Norman Webb	Rudge			

== 125 cc classification ==
Pos	Rider	Manufacturer	Laps	Time/Retired	Points
1	(Italy) Emilio Mendogni	Moto Morini	16	44:30.2	8
2	(Italy) Carlo Ubbiali	Mondial	16	+0.3	6
3	(United Kingdom) Leslie Graham	MV Agusta	16	+0.6	4
4	(Italy) Luigi Zinzani	Moto Morini	16	+1.0	3
5	(Italy) Guido Sala	MV Agusta	16	+23.1	2
6	(West Germany) Hubert Luttenberger	NSU	16	+40.4	1
7	(West Germany) Werner Haas	NSU			
8	(Italy) Nello Pagani	Mondial			
9	(Austria) Alex Mayer	Mondial			
10	(Italy) Tito Falconi	MV Agusta			
11	(United Kingdom) Federico Bettoni	MV Agusta			
18 starters, 9 finishers

== Sidecar classification ==
Pos	Rider	Passenger	Manufacturer	Laps	Time	Points
1	(Italy) Ernesto Merlo	(Italy) Dino Magri	Gilera	16	40:57.4	8
2	(United Kingdom) Cyril Smith	(West Germany) Les Nutt	Norton	16	+57.8	6
3	(Italy) Albino Milani	(West Germany) Giuseppe Pizzocri	Gilera	16	+1:46.2	4
4	(France) Jacques Drion	(West Germany) Inge Stoll	Norton			3
5	(Belgium) Marcel Masuy	(United Kingdom) Denis Jenkinson	Norton			2
6	(United Kingdom) Len Taylor	(United Kingdom) Peter Glover	Norton			1
7	(Italy) Giovanni Carru	?	Carru			
8	(France) Jean Murit	(France) André Emo	Norton			
9	(Belgium) Julien Deronne	(Belgium) Bruno Leys	Norton			
10	(Switzerland) Fritz Mühlemann	(Switzerland) Marie Mühlemann	Triumph			
11	del Corno	?	Moto Guzzi			
12	B. Prati	?	Moto Guzzi			

Previous race: 1952 Ulster Grand Prix	FIM Grand Prix World Championship; 1952 season	Next race: 1952 Spanish Grand Prix
Previous race: 1951 Nations Grand Prix	Nations Grand Prix	Next race: 1953 Nations Grand Prix
