= Pierre Monneret =

French motorcycle racer

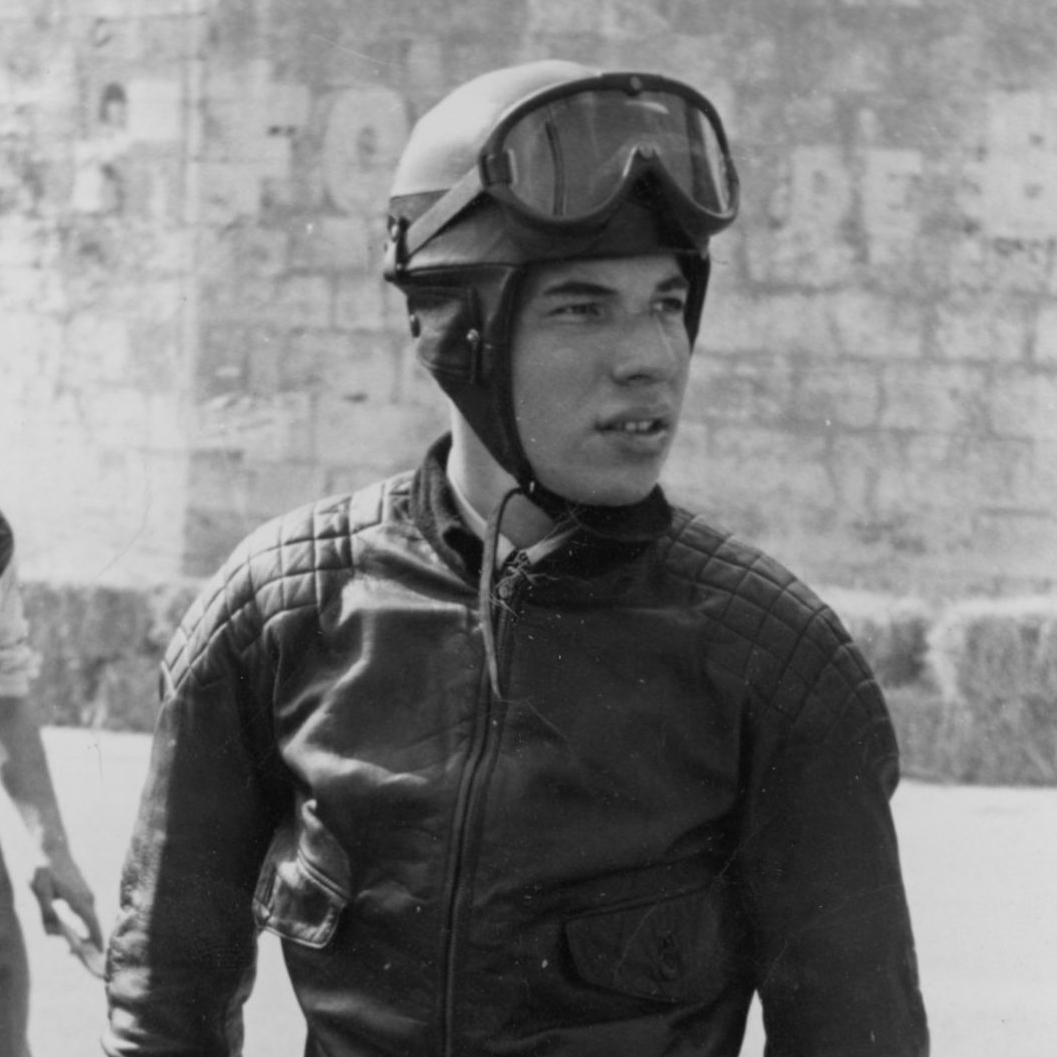
- Pierre Monneret in 1951
- Nationality: French
Motorcycle racing career statistics
Grand Prix motorcycle racing
Active years	1953–1956
First race	1953 350cc French Grand Prix
Last race	1956 500cc Nations Grand Prix
First win	1954 350cc French Grand Prix
Last win	1954 500cc French Grand Prix
Team	Gilera
Starts / Wins / Podiums / Poles / F. laps / Points; 10 / 2 / 8 / N/A / 2 / 45

Pierre Monneret (12 January 1931 – 3 March 2010) was a former Grand Prix motorcycle road racer from France. In 1954 he was the last French rider to win the French Grand Prix, in his last ever win, until 2025 when Johann Zarco won the 2025 French GP at the Le Mans Bugatti Circuit. His best year was in 1956 when he finished in fourth place in the 500cc world championship. Monneret won two Grand Prix races during his career.

Monneret was the son of former motorcycle racer George Monneret.

== Career statistics ==
=== FIM Endurance World Championship ===
Year	Bike	Rider	TC
1991	Yamaha	(France) Pierre Monneret (France) Rachel Nicotte	3rd
