= Hans Baltisberger =

German motorcycle racer (1922–1956)

- Nationality: German
Motorcycle racing career statistics
Grand Prix motorcycle racing
Active years	1952, 1954 – 1956
First race	1952 500cc German Grand Prix
Last race	1956 250cc German Grand Prix
Team	NSU
Starts / Wins / Podiums / Poles / F. laps / Points; 11 / 0 / 5 / N/A / N/A / 38

Hans Baltisberger (10 September 1922 – 26 August 1956 Brno) was a German professional Grand Prix motorcycle road racer.

== Motorcycle racing career ==
Baltisberger was born in the Betzingen District of Reutlingen, Germany. His father was a doctor, he had three sisters and one brother. His best year was in 1954 when he finished the season in fifth place in the 250cc world championship.

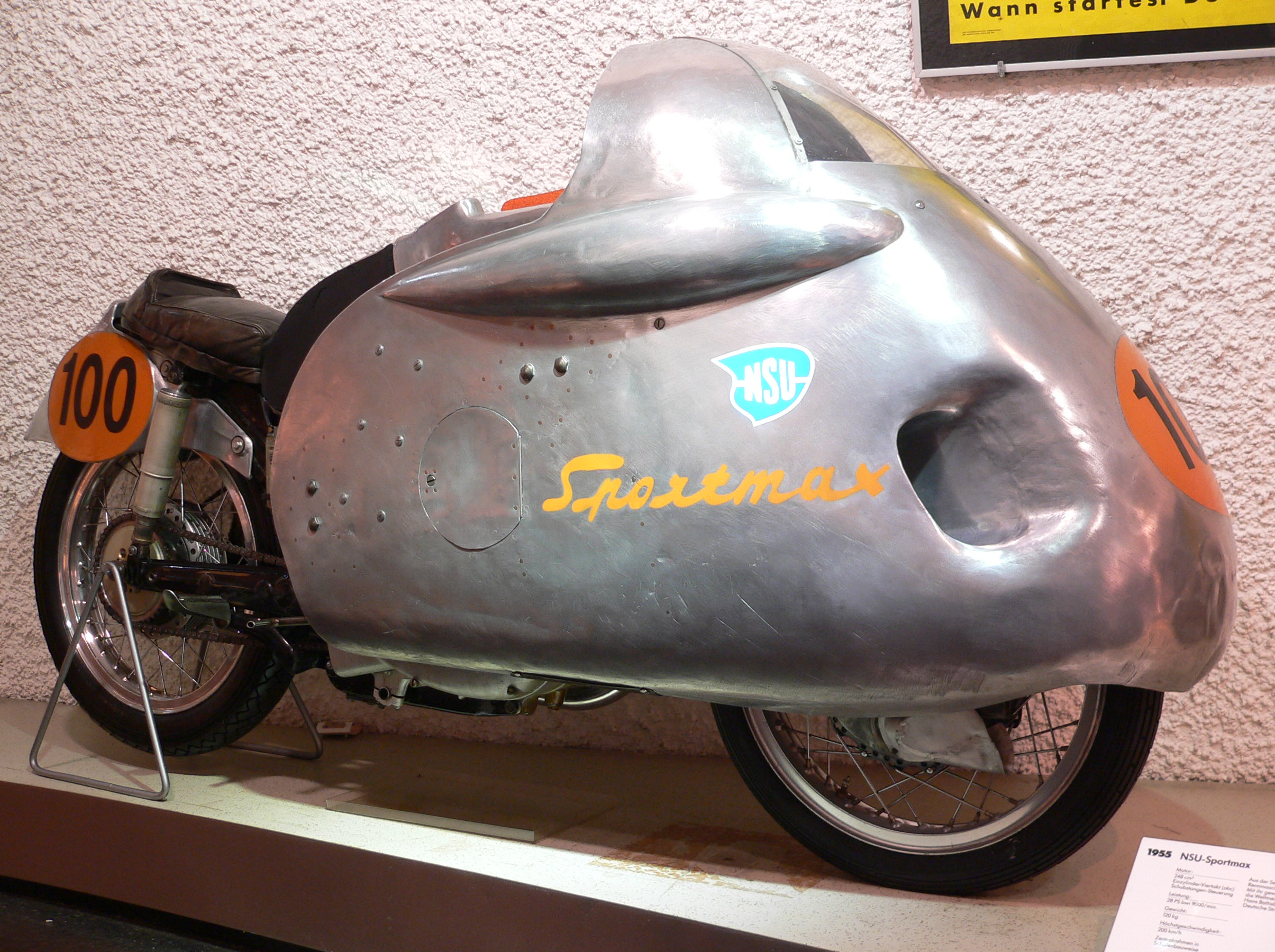
Zweirad Museum Neckarsulm Sportmax 1955 With a bike of this type Baltisberger won in 1955 the German championship

Baltisberger was killed while riding a 250cc NSU motorcycle at the 1956 Czechoslovak Grand Prix, a non-championship event at the Masaryk Circuit in Brno.
