= Feldbergrennen =

German automobile and motorcycle race

Coordinates: 50.2437°N 8.4440°E

Feldberg Circuit
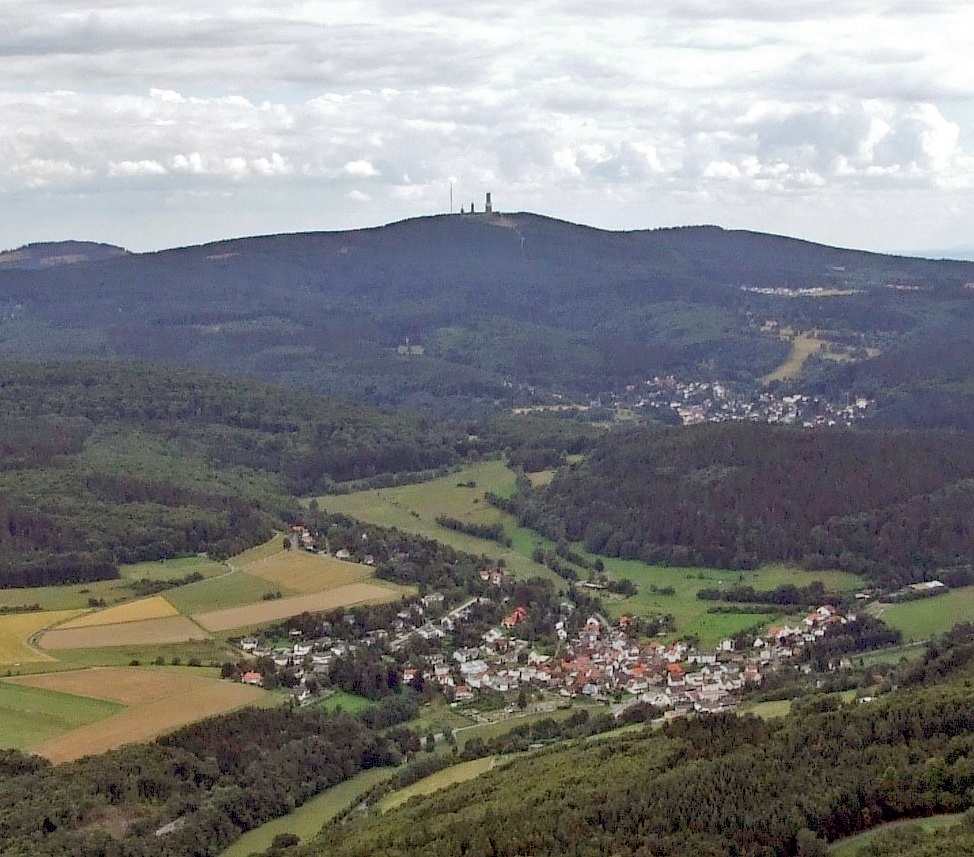
- Grosser Feldberg
- Major events: German Motorcycle Championship; Formula 3

1920–1928 Hill Climb
- Length: 8.44 km (5.24 mi)

1934–1936 Hill Climb
- Length: 8.44 km (5.24 mi)

1950–1954 Circuit Feldberg-Rundrennstrecke
- Length: 11.6 km (7.2 mi)
- Race lap record: Average speed: 119.1 km/h (74.0 mph) (Georg Meier, BMW, 1953)

The Feldbergrennen was an automobile and motorcycle race which took place between 1920 and 1954 on various courses in the field of the Großer Feldberg, 879 m (2,884 ft) above sea level in Hesse, Germany.

== History and route ==
The Feldbergrennen took place annually in 1920–1928, 1934–1936, and 1950–1954, in various motorcycle and automobile classes. In 1921, the route began at the point called "Hohe Mark" and ended at the point called "Sandplacken". From 1921 until 1935, the length of the route remained at 8.45 km (5.25 mi). Since 1935, the circuit was increased by 3.2 km (2 mi), reaching a total of 11.67 km (7.25 mi) in length.

The winner of the race in 1928 was Hans Stuck who was driving a car manufactured by Austro-Daimler. Other winners at the Feldberg race from the 1930s included Paul Pietsch with an Alfa Romeo as well as Hans Stuck and Bernd Rosemeyer with an Auto Union.

== Postwar era ==
Racing activity resumed on 1 October 1950 with an 11.67 km (7.25 mi) circuit, starting and finishing in the east of Oberreifenberg. At that time, almost all top-class German riders competed, including the DKW-drivers Hermann Paul Müller and Ewald Kluge. Walter Glöckler won in a self-made car with a VW engine in the sports-car class up to 1,100 cm^{3} (67 cu in).

The races from 1951 to 1954 included runs of the German Motorcycle Championship. About 100,000 spectators attended the event each year.

The Feldbergrennen on 18 July 1954 was an internationally announced German Championship race for motorcycles. The NSU team did not attend, but NSU-models dominated with drivers on the NSU Max (Sports Max) in the class up to 250 cm^{3} (15 cu in). Walter Reichert from Ingelheim am Rhein won the race over 13 laps or 151.68 km (94.25 mi) in 1:25:56.7 hours, averaging 105.0 km/h (65.2 mph); following were Fritz Kläger from Freiburg im Breisgau and third-place Hubert Luttenberger on Adler. The class to 350 cm^{3} (21 cu in) was dominated by August Hobl on DKW, averaging 112.4 km/h (69.8 mph), before three Australians with Norton. Jack Ahearn won the 500 rotary Solo class on a Norton, averaging 112.6 km/h (70.0 mph), ahead of another Norton and Walter Zeller on a BMW.

World Champion Eric Oliver from England crashed during the sidecar race, so that the first four places went to BMW, the number one to Wilhelm Noll and Fritz Cron, with an average 105.2 km/h (65.4 mph), followed by Fritz Hillebrand and Manfred Grunwald, Willi Faust and Karl Remmert, and Walter Schneider and Hans Bouquet. Approximately 50,000 spectators watched the Feldberg race in poor weather conditions, starting with the 125 cm^{3} (7.6 cu in) class and the victory of Horst Fügner from Chemnitz on an IFA, while Karl Lottes on MV Agusta finished second ahead of Erhart Krumpholz on another IFA.

== Closure ==
In 1955, the Supreme Motorcycle Sports Commission demanded the conversion of part of the track. As a result of the 1955 Le Mans disaster, many motor sport events throughout Europe were canceled or suspended. Conversion of the Feldberg track was never completed and its races came to an end.

Georg Meier holds the Feldberg lap record on a BMW with an average speed of 119.1 km/h (74 mph).

== Literature ==
(all books in German)

- Rühl, Holger: Die Feldbergrennen im Taunus 1904–1954 – Die Deutsche TT 1950–1954. Motorsportverlag, Weilrod-Finsternthal im Taunus 2009 (without ISBN)
- Rühl, Holger: Die Automobil-Rennen im Taunus 1904–1926. Societäts-Verlag, Frankfurt am Main 2004, ISBN 3-7973-0881-7.
- Steber, Rudolf: Zwischen Start und Ziel – legendäre Rennstrecken in Hessen; Feldbergring, Dieburger Dreieck, Schottenring, Herkules-Bergring, Battenbergring. Burgwald-Verlag, Cölbe-Schönstadt 2010, ISBN 978-3-936291-45-2.
