= Reg Armstrong =

Irish motorcycle racer (1928–1979)

- Armstrong at the Isle of Man TT races in 1962
- Nationality: Irish
Motorcycle racing career statistics
Grand Prix motorcycle racing
| Active years | 1949 – 1956 |
| First race | 1949 Isle of Man 350cc Junior TT |
| Last race | 1956 500cc Nations Grand Prix |
| First win | 1952 Isle of Man 500cc Senior TT |
| Last win | 1956 500cc West German Grand Prix |
| Team(s) | Velocette, AJS, Norton, Gilera |
Starts / Wins / Podiums / Poles / F. laps / Points; 47 / 7 / 29 / 0 / 2 / 129

Harold Reginald Armstrong (1 September 1928 – 24 November 1979) was an Irish professional Grand Prix motorcycle road racer. He was born in Dublin to Frederick and Margery Armstrong, grew up in Rathfarnham and raced for the AJS, Velocette, Norton, NSU, and Gilera factory racing teams. He then became team manager for Honda's racing team in 1962 and 1963, and they won five world championships in that time. He was also in his lifetime a sales agent for NSU, Honda, and Opel. He competed in Grand Prix Motorcycle World Championships and at the Isle of Man TT, usually placing highly. He died in a road accident in 1979.

== Early days ==
Reg Armstrong was born in a nursing home at 37 Lower Leeson Street, Dublin, on September 1, 1928. Armstrong did not have a privileged background but, his father started a successful motor factoring business in Dublin and supported his early motorcycle racing as much as he could. A cousin, Harry Lindsay taught him to ride during the Emergency (as World War II was referred to in the Republic of Ireland) and both rode 16H Nortons. Both joined the Irish Defence Forces, with the petrol ration a prime consideration.

== Racing career ==
In 1946, Armstrong rode a pre-war Norton Manx at the Bangor Castle races in Northern Ireland. His was fifth in his second race, a handicap event, the Mid-Antrim 150, and then failed to finish at the Skerries 100. He put in an entry for the 1946 Manx but was refused as his 18th birthday was on the same day as the race. He borrowed a 500 cc engine and put it into his Norton, and entered the 1947 Senior Manx race without success.

In the 1948 Skerries 100, Armstrong rode a Tom Arter AJS 7R to success, boosting his confidence enough to purchase a Triumph GP, with the help of his cousin Harry. He set fastest lap at the Cookstown 100 on that Triumph, at 74.79 mph, and at the 1949 Cookstown 100 raised it to 75.84 mph.

AJS soon invited Armstrong to ride an AJS Porcupine at Ansty, and he managed to come fourth. AJS then signed him for the inaugural 1949 Grand Prix motorcycle racing season. Armstrong took fourth in the Swiss Grand Prix, fifth at Belgium, fifth in the Netherlands, third at the Ulster Grand Prix, sixth at Monza, and crashed at Silverstone. Freddie Frith was 350 cc world champion, with Armstrong finishing in second.

At the 1950 Isle of Man TT, Armstrong came sixth in the Senior TT on a Velocette. He came sixth in the 500 cc class, and seventh in the 350 cc class for the 1951 Grand Prix World Championship, and was then offered a place for the 1952 season on the Norton team. Armstrong won his first ride for Norton, the 500 cc class in the Leinster 200. He then won the German Grand Prix, and the Isle of Man Senior TT. It was Armstrong's most successful season so far, coming third in the 500 cc 1952 World Championship, and second in the 350 cc.

In the Republic of Ireland, Armstrong was now the agent for NSU and Honda. From 1953 to 1955, he rode successfully for Gilera and NSU. In 1953 he came second on a Gilera in the 500 cc class, and second in the 250 cc class on an NSU. In the 1954 Grand Prix motorcycle racing season he came fifth on a Gilera in the 500 cc class, and ninth in the 250 cc class on an NSU. In 1955, he came second on a Gilera in the 500 cc class. In the 1956 Grand Prix motorcycle racing season, he came fifth on a Gilera in the 500 cc class, but growing business interests demanded more of his time and he announced his retirement from motorcycle racing.

== Post racing career ==
In 1962, Honda asked Armstrong to become their racing team manager. They won three World Championships that year and two more the following year. By now, however, Armstrong's Ringsend plant ceased assembling NSUs and changed over to Opels, Armstrong now being the Irish agent for them. In 1964, he tried his hand at car racing driving with limited success. He became a good clay pigeon shooter, representing Ireland in the 1978 World Championships, held in Korea.

On 24 November 1979, the 51-year-old Armstrong died in an accident outside Avoca while returning to his Ashford home. He is buried in Enniskerry.

== Motorcycle Grand Prix results ==
1949 point system

| Position | 1 | 2 | 3 | 4 | 5 | Fastest lap |
| Points | 10 | 8 | 7 | 6 | 5 | 1 |

Points system from 1950 to 1968

| Position | 1 | 2 | 3 | 4 | 5 | 6 |
| Points | 8 | 6 | 4 | 3 | 2 | 1 |

5 best results were counted until 1955.

(key) (Races in italics indicate fastest lap)

| Year | Class | Team | 1 | 2 | 3 | 4 | 5 | 6 | 7 | 8 | 9 | Points | Rank | Wins |
|---|---|---|---|---|---|---|---|---|---|---|---|---|---|---|
| 1949 | 350cc | AJS | IOM; 5 | SUI - | NED - | BEL; 6 | ULS - | NAT; 3 | | | | 18 | 2nd | 0 |
| 1949 | 500cc | AJS | IOM; 7 | SUI - | NED - | BEL - | ULS - | NAT - | | | | 0 | – | 0 |
| 1950 | 350cc | Velocette | IOM; NC | BEL - | NED; 5 | SUI; 4 | ULS; 2 | NAT - | | | | 11 | 5th | 0 |
| 1950 | 500cc | Velocette | IOM; 6 | BEL - | NED - | SUI - | ULS - | NAT - | | | | 1 | 17th | 0 |
| 1951 | 350cc | AJS | ESP - | SUI; 3 | IOM; 23 | BEL - | NED - | FRA; 5 | ULS; 4 | NAT; 5 | | 11 | 7th | 0 |
| 1951 | 500cc | AJS | ESP - | SUI; 2 | IOM; NC | BEL; 4 | NED - | FRA - | ULS - | NAT - | | 9 | 6th | 0 |
| 1952 | 350cc | Norton | SUI; 3 | IOM; 2 | NED; 4 | BEL; 3 | GER; 1 | ULS; 2 | NAT - | | | 24 | 2nd | 1 |
| 1952 | 500cc | Norton | SUI - | IOM; 1 | NED; 4 | BEL - | GER; 1 | ULS - | NAT; 6 | ESP; 5 | | 22 | 3rd | 2 |
| 1953 | 125cc | NSU | IOM - | NED - | | GER - | | ULS; 3 | | NAT - | ESP - | 4 | 9th | 0 |
| 1953 | 250cc | NSU | IOM - | NED; 3 | | GER - | | ULS; 1 | SUI; 1 | NAT; 4 | ESP - | 23 | 2nd | 2 |
| 1953 | 500cc | Gilera | IOM; 3 | NED; 2 | BEL; 3 | | FRA; 2 | ULS; 4 | SUI; 3 | NAT; 4 | ESP - | 24 | 2nd | 0 |
| 1954 | 250cc | NSU | FRA - | IOM; 3 | ULS - | | NED - | GER - | SUI - | NAT - | | 4 | 9th | 0 |
| 1954 | 500cc | Gilera | FRA - | IOM; 4 | ULS - | BEL - | NED - | GER; 3 | SUI; 3 | NAT; 5 | ESP - | 13 | 5th | 0 |
| 1955 | 500cc | Gilera | ESP; 1 | FRA; 3 | IOM; 2 | GER - | BEL - | NED; 2 | ULS - | NAT; 2 | | 30 | 2nd | 1 |
| 1956 | 500cc | Gilera | IOM - | NED - | BEL - | GER; 1 | ULS - | NAT; 4 | | | | 11 | 5th | 1 |
