= 1952 German motorcycle Grand Prix =

(West Germany) 1952 German Grand Prix
Race details
- Race 5 of 8 races in the 1952 Grand Prix motorcycle racing season
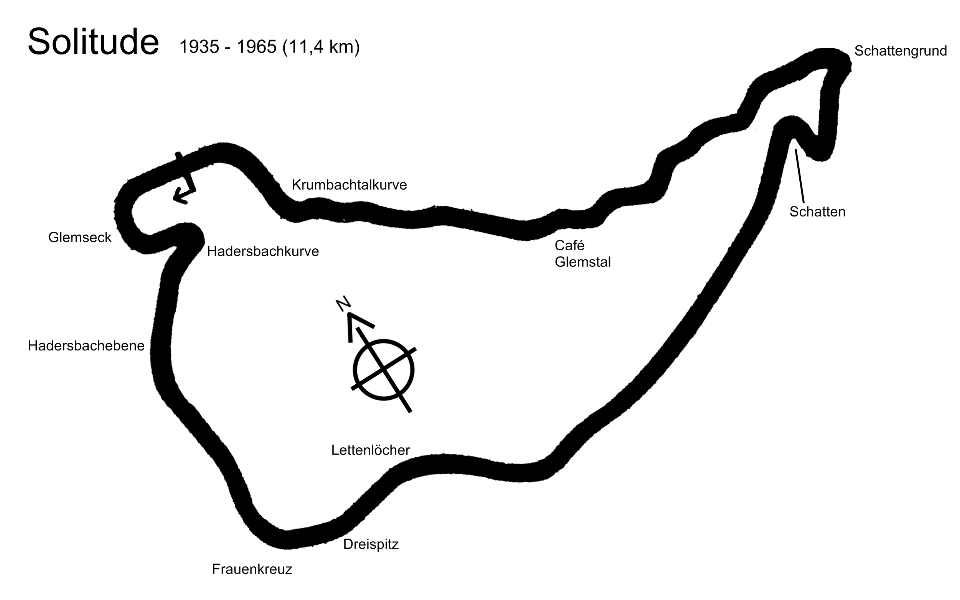
- Date: 20 July 1952
- Location: Solitude
- Course: Permanent racing facility; 11.453 km (7.117 mi)

500cc
- Rider
Fastest lap
Rider	(United Kingdom) Leslie Graham	MV Agusta
Time	5:02.3	
Podium
First	(Republic of Ireland) Reg Armstrong	Norton
Second	(Australia) Ken Kavanagh	Norton
Third	(United Kingdom) Syd Lawton	Norton

350cc
- Rider
Fastest lap
Rider	(United Kingdom) Bill Lomas	AJS
Time	5:09.1	
Podium
First	(Republic of Ireland) Reg Armstrong	Norton
Second	(Australia) Ken Kavanagh	Norton
Third	(United Kingdom) Bill Lomas	AJS

250cc
- Rider
Fastest lap
Rider	(Italy) Bruno Ruffo	Moto Guzzi
Time	5:19.6	
Podium
First	(West Germany) Rudi Felgenheier	DKW
Second	(West Germany) Heinrich Thorn-Prikker	Moto Guzzi
Third	(West Germany) Hermann Gablenz	Horex

125cc
- Rider
Fastest lap
Rider	(West Germany) Werner Haas	NSU
Time	5:44.2	
Podium
First	(West Germany) Werner Haas	NSU
Second	(Italy) Carlo Ubbiali	Mondial
Third	(United Kingdom) Cecil Sandford	MV Agusta

Sidecar (B2A)
- Rider
Fastest lap
Rider	(Italy) Ernesto Merlo	Gilera
Time	5:48.2	
Podium
First	(United Kingdom) Cyril Smith	Norton
Second	(Italy) Ernesto Merlo	Gilera
Third	(France) Jacques Drion	Norton

The 1952 German motorcycle Grand Prix was the fifth round of the 1952 Grand Prix motorcycle racing season. It took place on 20 July 1952 at the Solitude circuit.

== 500 cc classification ==
Pos	Rider	Manufacturer	Laps	Time	Points
1	(Republic of Ireland) Reg Armstrong	Norton	18	1:32:35.7	8
2	(Australia) Ken Kavanagh	Norton	18	+0.4	6
3	(United Kingdom) Syd Lawton	Norton	18	+0.4	4
4	(United Kingdom) Leslie Graham	MV Agusta			3
5	(Belgium) Auguste Goffin	Norton			2
6	(West Germany) Hans Baltisberger	BMW			1
7	(Australia) Tony McAlpine	Norton			
8	(West Germany) Karl Rührschneck	Norton			
9	(West Germany) Siegfried Fuss	Norton			
10	(West Germany) Rudi Knees	Norton			

== 350 cc classification ==
Pos	Rider	Manufacturer	Laps	Time	Points
1	(Republic of Ireland) Reg Armstrong	Norton	14	1:13:49.9	8
2	(Australia) Ken Kavanagh	Norton	14	+0.1	6
3	(United Kingdom) Bill Lomas	AJS	14	+28.1	4
4	(United Kingdom) Syd Lawton	Norton			3
5	(West Germany) Ewald Kluge	DKW			2
6	(Australia) Ernie Ring	AJS			1
7	(Belgium) Auguste Goffin	Norton			
8	(West Germany) Robert Zeller	AJS			
9	(New Zealand) Ken Mudford	AJS			
10	(United Kingdom) Bill Petch	AJS			

== 250 cc classification ==
Pos	Rider	Manufacturer	Laps	Time	Points
1	(West Germany) Rudi Felgenheier	DKW	12	1:05:51.3	8
2	(West Germany) Heinrich Thorn-Prikker	Moto Guzzi	12	+51.2	6
3	(West Germany) Hermann Gablenz	Horex	12	+2:24.5	4
4	(West Germany) Ewald Kluge	DKW			3
5	(West Germany) Gotthilf Gehring	Moto Guzzi			2
6	(United Kingdom) Arthur Wheeler	Moto Guzzi			1
7	(West Germany) Bruno Böhrer	Parilla			
8	(Austria) Alex Mayer	Moto Guzzi			
9	(Austria) Rupert Hollaus	Moto Guzzi			
10	(Italy) Lanfranco Baviera	Moto Guzzi			

== 125cc classification ==
Pos	Rider	Manufacturer	Laps	Time/Retired	Points
1	(West Germany) Werner Haas	NSU	10	58:28.8	8
2	(Italy) Carlo Ubbiali	Mondial	10	+0.7	6
3	(United Kingdom) Cecil Sandford	MV Agusta	10	+13.1	4
4	(Italy) Angelo Copeta	MV Agusta	10	+58.2	3
5	(West Germany) Hubert Luttenberger	NSU	10	+1:58.0	2
6	(Italy) Luigi Zinzani	Moto Morini	10	+3:53.6	1
7	(Austria) Alex Mayer	Mondial			
8	(West Germany) Rudi Meister	Mondial			
9	(West Germany) Karl Lottes	MV Agusta			
10	(Spain) Alfonso Mila	Montesa			
32 starters, 10 finishers

== Sidecar classification ==
Pos	Rider	Passenger	Manufacturer	Laps	Time	Points
1	(United Kingdom) Cyril Smith	(West Germany) Bob Clements	Norton	10	59:17.0	8
2	(Italy) Ernesto Merlo	(Italy) Dino Magri	Gilera	10	+0.3	6
3	(France) Jacques Drion	(United Kingdom) Bob Onslow	Norton	10	+1:48.0	4
4	(Belgium) Marcel Masuy	(United Kingdom) Denis Jenkinson	Norton			3
5	(Belgium) Julien Deronne	(Belgium) Edouard Texidor	Norton			2
6	(West Germany) Wilhelm Noll	(West Germany) Fritz Cron	BMW			1
7	(West Germany) Georg Eberlein	(West Germany) Ernst Sauer	BMW			
8	(West Germany) Franz Mohr	(West Germany) Günter Müller	BMW			
9	(West Germany) Friedrich Staschel	(West Germany) Günter Beer	BMW			
10	(France) Jean Murit	(France) André Emo	Norton			

Previous race: 1952 Belgian Grand Prix	FIM Grand Prix World Championship; 1952 season	Next race: 1952 Ulster Grand Prix
Previous race: 1951 German Grand Prix	German Grand Prix	Next race: 1953 German Grand Prix
