= Lube Motorcycles =

Former Spanish motorcycle manufacture

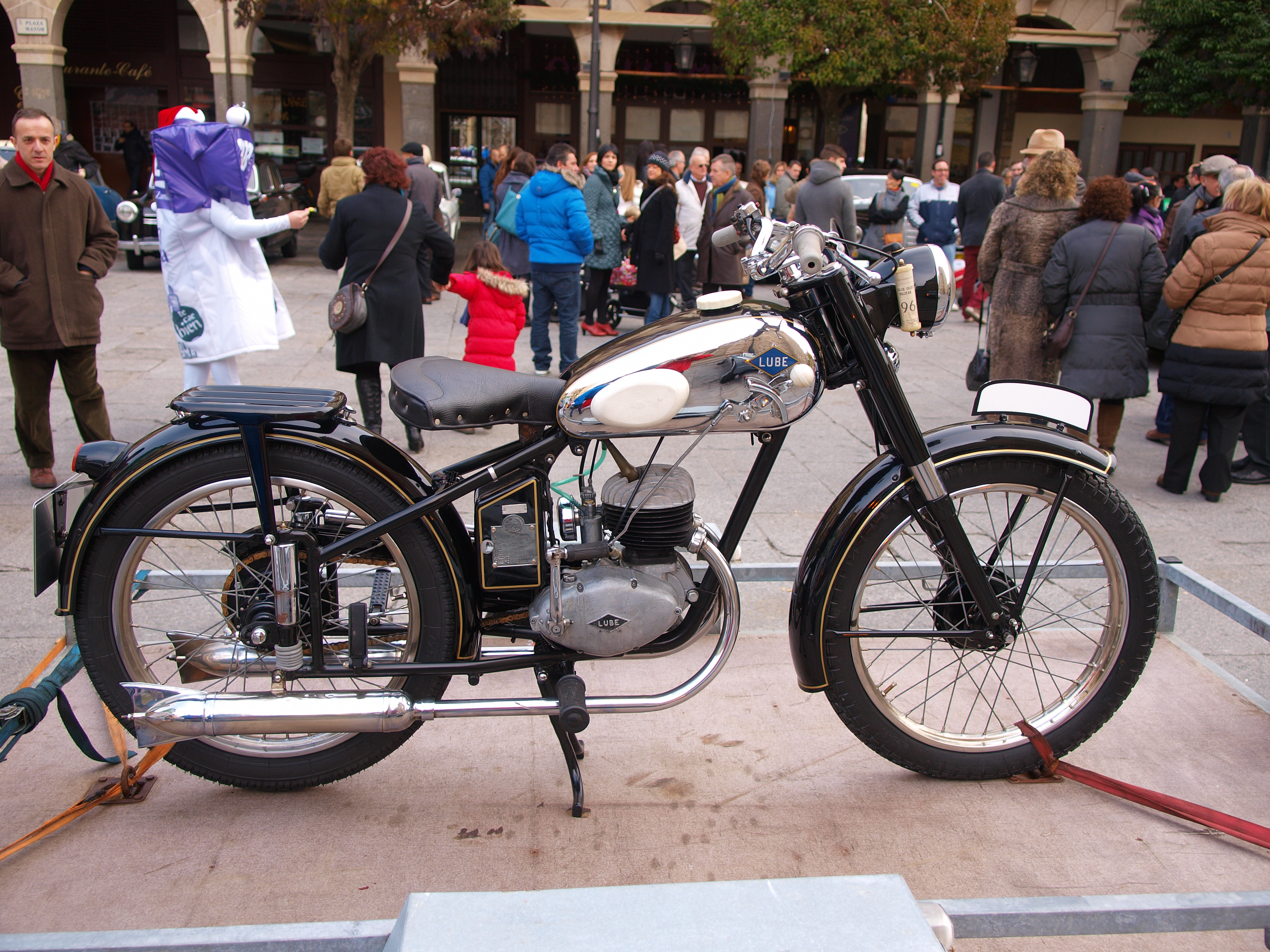
Lube Motorcycles

Founded in 1947, Lube Motorcycles was a Spanish motorcycle manufacturer, based in Barakaldo. Their motorcycles used engines from NSU, another motorcycle manufacturer.

== History ==
In 1947, the engineer Luis Bejarano Morga founded the company Lube-Nsu in Luchana (Barakaldo). Luis had been an engineer in Douglas (Bristol) for nearly thirty years, this work providing the experience needed for the adventure. The company agreed with Douglas the supply of steel, but the agreement brought no results, because of the English company entering bankruptcy. In 1946 he had designed a bike called LBM (following the initials of its founder: Luis Bejarano Morga), later on, he was making improvements and began the series A-99.

At the time of maximum production the company built nearly 1000 bikes per year, and its popularity was such that it was considered the "bike of the people".

In 1952 Luis Bejarano reaches an agreement with the German company NSU Motorenwerke AG (today's Audi) and thus Lube starts to incorporate pieces of German technology on their motorcycles. At this time the company begins to develop the models "Renn".

The company died in 1967.
