= 1953 Isle of Man TT =

Annual motorcycle racing event

The 1953 Isle of Man Tourist Trophy saw Ray Amm (Rhodesia) win both Senior and Junior TT races. Bob McIntyre retired for his first TT, the Junior.

The event was marred by the death of five people, including the first ever 500cc motorcycle world champion, Leslie Graham, who was killed at Bray Hill during the Senior TT. Graham had won his first ever TT race, the Ultra Lightweight TT, the day before. As a sign of respect, his team, MV Agusta, withdrew from the rest of the event.

== Senior TT (500cc) ==
Rank	Rider	Team	Speed	Time
1	(Federation of Rhodesia and Nyasaland) Ray Amm	Norton	93.85 mph	2.48.51.8
2	(United Kingdom) Jack Brett	Norton	93.74	2:49.03.8
3	(Republic of Ireland) Reg Armstrong	Gilera	93.62	2:49.16.8
4	(New Zealand) Rod Coleman	AJS	92.77	2:50.49.6
5	(United Kingdom) Bill Doran	AJS	90.86	2:54.25.0
6	(United Kingdom) Peter Davey	Norton	86.97	3:02.13.0
7	(United Kingdom) Ted Frend	Norton	86.72	3:02.44.6
8	(United Kingdom) Robin Sherry	AJS	86.5	3:03.13.4
9	(United Kingdom) Harry Pearce	Matchless	86.38	3:03.28.4
10	(United Kingdom) John Grace	Norton	85.54	3:05.15.8

== Junior TT (350cc) ==
Rank	Rider	Team	Speed	Time
1	(Federation of Rhodesia and Nyasaland) Ray Amm	Norton	90.52 mph	2:55.05.0
2	(Australia) Ken Kavanagh	Norton	90.44	2:55.14.6
3	(United Kingdom) Fergus Anderson	Moto Guzzi	89.41	2:57.40.6
4	(United Kingdom) Jack Brett	Norton	88.7	2:58.40.4
5	(United Kingdom) Bill Doran	AJS	86.9	3:02.21.0
6	(United Kingdom) Derek Farrant	AJS	86.59	3:03.02.0
7	(New Zealand) Ken Mudford	AJS	85.49	3:05.23.0
8	(United Kingdom) George Murphy	AJS	84.39	3:07.48.2
9	(United Kingdom) Phil Carter	AJS	84.28	3:08.02.6
10	(United Kingdom) Harold Clark	AJS	93.72	3:09.18.0

== Lightweight TT (250cc) ==
Rank	Rider	Team	Speed	Time	Gap
1	(United Kingdom) Fergus Anderson	Moto Guzzi	84.73 mph	1.46.53.0	
2	(Germany) Werner Haas	NSU	84.52	1:47.10.0	+ 17.0
3	(Germany) Siegfried Wunsche	DKW	81.34	1:51.20.0	+ 4:27.0
4	(United Kingdom) Arthur Wheeler	Moto Guzzi	80.38	1:52.40.0	+ 5:47.0
5	(United Kingdom) Syd Willis	Velocette	75.38	2:00.08.0	+ 13:15.0
6	(United Kingdom) Tommy Wood	Moto Guzzi	74.82	2:01.02.0	+ 14:09.0
7	(United Kingdom) Ray Petty	Norton	74.67	2:01.17.0	+ 14:24.0
8	(United Kingdom) Albert Jones	M&F Excelsior	72.26	2:05.20.0	+ 18:27.0
9	(United Kingdom) Bill Webster	Velocette	71.96	2:05.51.0	+ 18:58.0
10	(United Kingdom) Bob Geeson	REG	71.74	2:06.14.0	+ 19:21.0

== Ultra Lightweight TT (125cc) ==
Rank	Rider	Team	Speed	Time	Gap
1	(United Kingdom) Leslie Graham	MV Agusta	77.79 mph	1.27.19.0	
2	(Germany) Werner Haas	NSU	77.18	1:28.00.0	+ 41.0
3	(United Kingdom) Cecil Sandford	MV Agusta	77.15	1:28.02.0	+ 43.0
4	(Italy) Angelo Copeta	MV Agusta	73.44	1:32.29.0	+ 5:10.0
5	(United Kingdom) Albert Jones	MV Agusta	67.48	1:40.39.0	+ 13:20.0
6	(United Kingdom) Bill Webster	MV Agusta	67.07	1:41.16.0	+ 13:57.0
7	(United Kingdom) Archie Fenn	Mondial	67.03	1:41.20.0	+ 14:01.0
8	(United Kingdom) Norman Webb	MV Agusta	65.73	1:43.20.0	+ 16:01.0
9	(United Kingdom) James Thomson	MV Agusta	64.71	1:44.56.0	+ 17:37.0
10	(United Kingdom) Fron Purslow	MV	61.9	1:49.44.0	+ 22:25.0

== Clubmans 1000 TT ==
Rank	Rider	Team	Speed	Time
1	(United Kingdom) George Douglass	Vincent	81.54 mph	1.51.04.0
2	(United Kingdom) Geoffrey Clark	Vincent	79.39	1:54.04.0
3	(United Kingdom) Peter Peters	Vincent	74.24	2:01.59.0

== Clubmans Senior TT ==
Rank	Rider	Team	Speed	Time
1	(United Kingdom) Bob Keeler	Norton	84.14 mph	1.20.43.4
2	(United Kingdom) Eddie Crooks	Norton	83.0	1.21.49.8
3	(United Kingdom) Alan Holmes	Norton	82.46	1.22.22.2

== Clubmans Junior TT ==
Rank	Rider	Team	Speed	Time
1	(United Kingdom) Derek Powell	BSA	80.17 mph	1.52.57.8
2	(United Kingdom) Owen Greenwood	BSA	79.23	1:54.18.0
3	(United Kingdom) Jack Bottomley	Norton	79.09	1:54.21.6
