= 1952 Isle of Man TT =

Annual motorcycle racing event

Race details
- Race 2 of 9 races in the 1952 Grand Prix motorcycle racing season
- Date: 9–13 June 1952
- Official name: Isle of Man Tourist Trophy
- Location: Snaefell Mountain Course
- Course: Public roads; 60.72 km (37.73 mi)

500cc
- Rider
Fastest lap
Rider	(United Kingdom) Geoff Duke	Norton
Time	23m 52s	
Podium
First	(Republic of Ireland) Reg Armstrong	Norton
Second	(United Kingdom) Leslie Graham	MV Agusta
Third	(Southern Rhodesia) Ray Amm	Norton

350cc
- Rider
Fastest lap
Rider	(United Kingdom) Geoff Duke	Norton
Time	24m 53s	
Podium
First	(United Kingdom) Geoff Duke	Norton
Second	(Republic of Ireland) Reg Armstrong	Norton
Third	(New Zealand) Rod Coleman	AJS

250cc
- Rider
Fastest lap
Rider	(Italy) Bruno Ruffo	Moto Guzzi
Time	26m 42s	
Podium
First	(United Kingdom) Fergus Anderson	Moto Guzzi
Second	(Italy) Enrico Lorenzetti	Moto Guzzi
Third	(United Kingdom) Syd Lawton	Moto Guzzi

125cc
- Rider
Fastest lap
Rider	(United Kingdom) Cecil Sandford	MV Agusta
Time	29:46.0	
Podium
First	(United Kingdom) Cecil Sandford	MV Agusta
Second	(Italy) Carlo Ubbiali	Mondial
Third	(United Kingdom) Len Parry	Mondial

The 1952 Isle of Man Tourist Trophy was the start of Bob McIntyre's association with the Isle of Man, when he came second in the Junior Clubman TT that year. Irishman Reg Armstrong won his first Senior TT event as well as coming in second in the Junior TT race on a Norton. Armstrong, as a Norton works rider, was back-up to Geoff Duke who came first in the Junior race.

== Senior TT (500 cc) classification ==
Pos	Rider	Manufacturer	Laps	Time	Points
1	(Republic of Ireland) Reg Armstrong	Norton	7	2:50:28.4	8
2	(United Kingdom) Leslie Graham	MV Agusta	7	+26.6	6
3	(Southern Rhodesia) Ray Amm	Norton	7	+1:02.8	4
4	(New Zealand) Rod Coleman	AJS	7	+6:10.6	3
5	(United Kingdom) Bill Lomas	AJS	7	+8:10.6	2
6	(United Kingdom) Cromie McCandless	Norton	7	+8:22.8	1
7	(United Kingdom) George Brown	Norton	7	+10:07.4	
8	(New Zealand) Ken Mudford	Norton	7	+10:10.6	
9	(United Kingdom) Albert Moule	Norton	7	+12:13.2	
10	(United Kingdom) Phil Carter	Norton	7	+13:03.4	
41 finishers

== Junior TT (350 cc) classification ==
Pos	Rider	Manufacturer	Laps	Time	Points
1	(United Kingdom) Geoff Duke	Norton	7	2:55:30.6	8
2	(Republic of Ireland) Reg Armstrong	Norton	7	+1:27.2	6
3	(New Zealand) Rod Coleman	AJS	7	+2:41.8	4
4	(United Kingdom) Bill Lomas	AJS	7	+5:03.4	3
5	(United Kingdom) Syd Lawton	AJS	7	+11:34.4	2
6	(United Kingdom) George Brown	AJS	7	+12:02.8	1
7	(United Kingdom) Cromie McCandless	Norton	7	+12:59.8	
8	(Australia) Ernie Ring	AJS	7	+13:12.2	
9	(United Kingdom) Cecil Sandford	Velocette	7	+14:49.6	
10	(United Kingdom) Phil Carter	Norton	7	+16:46.0	
51 finishers

== Lightweight TT (250 cc) classification ==
Pos	Rider	Manufacturer	Laps	Time	Points
1	(United Kingdom) Fergus Anderson	Moto Guzzi	4	1:48:08.6	8
2	(Italy) Enrico Lorenzetti	Moto Guzzi	4	+32.2	6
3	(United Kingdom) Syd Lawton	Moto Guzzi	4	+1:34.6	4
4	(United Kingdom) Leslie Graham	Velocette	4	+2:13.4	3
5	(United Kingdom) Maurice Cann	Moto Guzzi	4	+2:43.0	2
6	(Italy) Bruno Ruffo	Moto Guzzi	4	+3:17.4	1
7	(United Kingdom) Ron Mead	Velocette	4	+9:39.8	
8	(United Kingdom) Ray Petty	Norton	4	+10:52.4	
9	(United Kingdom) Arthur Wheeler	Moto Guzzi	4	+11:51.8	
10	(United Kingdom) Charlie Salt	Pike-Rudge	4	+12:30.0	
22 finishers

== Ultra-Lightweight TT (125 cc) classification ==
Pos.	Rider	Manufacturer	Laps	Time/Retired	Points
1	(United Kingdom) Cecil Sandford	MV Agusta	3	1:29:54.8	8
2	(Italy) Carlo Ubbiali	Mondial	3	+1:40.2	6
3	(United Kingdom) Len Parry	Mondial	3	+4:07.8	4
4	(United Kingdom) Cromie McCandless	Mondial	3	+7:18.4	3
5	(Italy) Angelo Copeta	MV Agusta	3	+8:38.6	2
6	(United Kingdom) Frank Burman	EMC-Puch	3	+17:39.2	1
7	Harvey Williams	BSA	3	+27:07.6	
8	(United Kingdom) Howard Grindley	DMW-Royal Enfield	3	+27:47.2	
9	(United Kingdom) Noel Mavrogordato	EMC-Puch	3	+28:52.2	
10	(United Kingdom) Eric Hardy	Dot	3	+29:08.2	
16 starters, 12 finishers

== Non-championship races ==
=== Clubmans Senior TT classification ===
Pos	Rider	Manufacturer	Laps	Time
1	Bernard Hargreaves	Triumph	4	1:49:50.0
2	Ken James	Norton	4	+38.6
3	John Clark	Norton	4	+42.6
4	Derek Farrant	Norton	4	
5	Jack Bottomley	Triumph	4	
6	Robert Kerr	Triumph	4	
7	Bob Ritchie	Norton	4	
8	D. K. Tyndale-Powell	BSA	4	
9	A. M. Cook	Triumph	4	
10	Bill Dobbs	Norton	4	

=== Clubmans Junior TT classification ===
Pos	Rider	Manufacturer	Laps	Time
1	Eric Houseley	BSA	4	1:54:45.2
2	Bob McIntyre	BSA	4	+32.2
3	Ken James	Norton	4	+39.4
4	C. E. Staley	BSA	4	
5	Derek Powell	BSA	4	
6	Harry Plews	Norton	4	
7	Harry Brown	BSA	4	
8	R. Jones	BSA	4	
9	Bob Ritchie	Norton	4	
10	Eric Jones	BSA	4	

== Sources ==
Previous race: 1952 Swiss Grand Prix	FIM Grand Prix World Championship; 1952 season	Next race: 1952 Dutch TT
Previous race: 1951 Isle of Man TT	Isle of Man TT	Next race: 1953 Isle of Man TT
