= Swiss motorcycle Grand Prix =

Coordinates: 46°57′32″N 7°24′07″E

Swiss Grand Prix

Grand Prix motorcycle racing
- Venue: Circuit Bremgarten (1949, 1951–1954); Circuit des Nations (1950)
- First race: 1949
- Last race: 1954
- Most wins (rider): Fergus Anderson, Leslie Graham (4)
- Most wins (manufacturer): Moto Guzzi (5)

The Swiss motorcycle Grand Prix was a motorcycling event that was part of the Grand Prix motorcycle racing season from 1949 to 1954.

== Official names and sponsors ==
- 1949, 1951: Großer Preis der Schweiz für Motorräder un Seitenwagen (no official sponsor)
- 1950: G.d Prix Suisse (no official sponsor)
- 1952: Grosser Preis der Schweiz für Automobile, Motorräder un Seitenwagen (no official sponsor)
- 1953: Großer Preis der Schweiz für Automobile, Motorräder un Seitenwagen (no official sponsor)
- 1954: Grand Prix Bern (no official sponsor)

== Winners ==
=== Multiple winners (riders) ===
# Wins	Rider	Wins	
# Wins	Rider	Category	Years won
4	(United Kingdom) Leslie Graham	500cc	1949, 1950
4	(United Kingdom) Leslie Graham	350cc	1950, 1951
4	(United Kingdom) Fergus Anderson	500cc	1951
4	(United Kingdom) Fergus Anderson	350cc	1953, 1954
4	(United Kingdom) Fergus Anderson	250cc	1952
3	(United Kingdom) Geoff Duke	500cc	1953, 1954
3	(United Kingdom) Geoff Duke	350cc	1952
2	(Italy) Dario Ambrosini	250cc	1950, 1951

=== Multiple winners (manufacturers) ===
# Wins	Manufacturer	Wins	
# Wins	Manufacturer	Category	Years won
5	(Italy) Moto Guzzi	500cc	1951
5	(Italy) Moto Guzzi	350cc	1953, 1954
5	(Italy) Moto Guzzi	250cc	1949, 1952
4	(United Kingdom) AJS	500cc	1949, 1950, 1952
4	(United Kingdom) AJS	350cc	1950
2	(United Kingdom) Velocette	350cc	1949, 1951
2	(Italy) Benelli	250cc	1950, 1951
2	(Italy) Gilera	500cc	1953, 1954
2	(West Germany) NSU	250cc	1953, 1954

=== By year ===
A pink background indicates an event that was not part of the Grand Prix motorcycle racing championship.

Year	Track	125cc		175cc		250cc		350cc		500cc		Report
Year	Track	Rider	Manufacturer	Rider	Manufacturer	Rider	Manufacturer	Rider	Manufacturer	Rider	Manufacturer	Report
1954	Bremgarten					(Austria) Rupert Hollaus	NSU	(United Kingdom) Fergus Anderson	Moto Guzzi	(United Kingdom) Geoff Duke	Gilera	Report
1953	Bremgarten					(Republic of Ireland) Reg Armstrong	NSU	(United Kingdom) Fergus Anderson	Moto Guzzi	(United Kingdom) Geoff Duke	Gilera	Report
1952	Bremgarten					(United Kingdom) Fergus Anderson	Moto Guzzi	(United Kingdom) Geoff Duke	Norton	(United Kingdom) Jack Brett	AJS	Report
1951	Bremgarten					(Italy) Dario Ambrosini	Benelli	(United Kingdom) Leslie Graham	Velocette	(United Kingdom) Fergus Anderson	Moto Guzzi	Report
1950	Geneva					(Italy) Dario Ambrosini	Benelli	(United Kingdom) Leslie Graham	AJS	(United Kingdom) Leslie Graham	AJS	Report
1949	Bremgarten	(Italy) Nello Pagani	Mondial			(Italy) Bruno Ruffo	Moto Guzzi	(United Kingdom) Freddie Frith	Velocette	(United Kingdom) Leslie Graham	AJS	Report
1948	Geneva					(Italy) Dario Ambrosini	Benelli	(United Kingdom) Artie Bell	Norton	(United Kingdom) Harold Daniell	Norton	Report
1947	Bremgarten					(Italy) Bruno Francisci	Moto Guzzi	(United Kingdom) Fergus Anderson	Velocette	(Italy) Omobono Tenni	Moto Guzzi	Report
1946	Geneva					(Italy) Celeste Cavaciuti	Moto Guzzi	(Switzerland) Walther Hess	Velocette	(Italy) Nello Pagani	Gilera	Report
1938	Geneva					(Germany) Ewald Kluge	DKW	(United Kingdom) Harold Daniell	Norton	(United Kingdom) Harold Daniell	Norton	Report
1937	Bremgarten					(Italy) Omobono Tenni	Moto Guzzi	(United Kingdom) Jimmie Guthrie	Norton	(United Kingdom) Jimmie Guthrie	Norton	Report
1936	Bremgarten					(Italy) Omobono Tenni	Moto Guzzi	(United Kingdom) Jimmie Guthrie	Norton	(United Kingdom) Jimmie Guthrie	Norton	Report
1935	Bremgarten					(Germany) Walfried Winkler	DKW	(United Kingdom) Walter Rusk	Norton	(United Kingdom) Jimmie Guthrie	Norton	Report
1934	Bremgarten					(Italy) Amilcare Moretti	Moto Guzzi	(United Kingdom) Jimmie Simpson	Norton	(United Kingdom) Jimmie Simpson	Norton	Report
1933	Bremgarten			(Italy) Carlo Fumagalli	Miller	(United Kingdom) Wal Handley	Moto Guzzi	(United Kingdom) Tim Hunt	Norton	(Republic of Ireland) Stanley Woods	Norton	Report
1932	Bremgarten	(Switzerland) H. Schorr	Zehnder	(Italy) Carlo Baschieri	Benelli	(Italy) Carlo Fumagalli	Moto Guzzi	(Republic of Ireland) Stanley Woods	Norton	(Republic of Ireland) Stanley Woods	Norton	Report
1931	Bremgarten	(Switzerland) A. Liechti	Zehnder	(Italy) Carlo Baschieri	Benelli	(Italy) Terzo Bandini	Moto Guzzi	(United Kingdom) Tim Hunt	Norton	(Republic of Ireland) Stanley Woods	Norton	Report
1930	Lugano	(Switzerland) A. Liechti	Zehnder	(Italy) Raffaele Alberti	Ancora/Villiers	(Italy) Felice Nazzaro	Moto Guzzi	(Switzerland) Ernst Haenni	Condor	(Switzerland) "Gugoltz"	Sunbeam	Report
1929	Meyrin	(Switzerland) "Crotti"	Zehnder	(Switzerland) Georges Trezza	Allegro	(Switzerland) Otto Zehnder	Zehnder	(France) François Gaussorgues	Monet-Goyon	(Switzerland) Emil Frey	Radco	Report
1928	Meyrin	(Switzerland) Paul Lehmann	Moser	(Italy) Alfredo Panella	Ladetto-Blatto	(United Kingdom) Cecil Ashby	OK-Supreme	(United Kingdom) Wal Handley	Motosacoche	(United Kingdom) Wal Handley	Motosacoche	Report
1927	Meyrin	(Switzerland) O. Graf	Zehnder	(France) Alexandre Hommaire	Monet-Goyon	(Italy) Licinio Lasagni	Moto Guzzi	(United Kingdom) Jimmie Simpson	AJS	(Republic of Ireland) Stanley Woods	Norton	Report

Year	Track	250cc		350cc		500cc		1000cc		Report
Year	Track	Rider	Manufacturer	Rider	Manufacturer	Rider	Manufacturer	Rider	Manufacturer	Report
1924	Meyrin	(Switzerland) Léon Divorne	Condor	(United Kingdom) Tommy de la Haye	Sunbeam	(United Kingdom) Graham Walker	Sunbeam			Report
1923	Meyrin	(Switzerland) Paul Dinkel	Condor	(Italy) Isacco Mariani	Garelli	(France) Paul Péan	Peugeot			Report
1922	Lac de Joux	(Switzerland) Georges Trezza	Moser	(Switzerland) Alfred Heusser	Condor	(France) "Lavanchy"	Douglas	(Switzerland) "Borsetti"	Harley-Davidson	Report
