= 1952 Ulster Grand Prix =

Race details
- Race 6 of 8 races in the 1952 Grand Prix motorcycle racing season
- Date: 14–16 August 1952
- Location: Clady Circuit
- Course: Public roads; 26.5 km (16.5 mi)

500cc
- Rider
Fastest lap
Rider	(United Kingdom) Leslie Graham	MV Agusta
Time	9:21.0	
Podium
First	(United Kingdom) Cromie McCandless	Gilera
Second	(New Zealand) Rod Coleman	AJS
Third	(United Kingdom) Bill Lomas	MV Agusta

350cc
- Rider
Fastest lap
Rider	(Australia) Ken Kavanagh	Norton
Time	10:12.0	
Podium
First	(Australia) Ken Kavanagh	Norton
Second	(Republic of Ireland) Reg Armstrong	Norton
Third	(New Zealand) Rod Coleman	AJS

250cc
- Rider
Fastest lap
Rider	(Italy) Enrico Lorenzetti	Moto Guzzi
Time	11:8.0	
Podium
First	(United Kingdom) Maurice Cann	Moto Guzzi
Second	(Italy) Enrico Lorenzetti	Moto Guzzi
Third	(United Kingdom) Leslie Graham	Velocette

125cc
- Rider
Fastest lap
Rider	(United Kingdom) Cecil Sandford	MV Agusta
Time	12:36.0	
Podium
First	(United Kingdom) Cecil Sandford	MV Agusta
Second	(United Kingdom) Bill Lomas	MV Agusta
Third	(United Kingdom) Charlie Salt	MV Agusta

The 1952 Ulster Grand Prix was the sixth round of the 1952 Grand Prix motorcycle racing season. It took place on 14–16 August 1952 at the Clady Circuit.

The 125cc, 250cc, and 350cc races were run concurrently with each other.

== 500 cc classification ==
Pos	Rider	Manufacturer	Laps	Time	Points
1	(Northern Ireland) Cromie McCandless	Gilera	15	2:28:54.0	8
2	(New Zealand) Rod Coleman	AJS	15	+2:47.3	6
3	(United Kingdom) Bill Lomas	MV Agusta	15	+5:07.8	4
4	(United Kingdom) Jack Brett	AJS	15	+6:14.0	3
5	(Northern Ireland) Phil Carter	Norton	15	+8:27.4	2
6	(United Kingdom) John Surtees	Norton	14	1 Lap	1
7	(United Kingdom) Roy Evans	Norton	14	1 Lap	
8	(Northern Ireland) William Campbell	Norton	14	1 Lap	
9	(Northern Ireland) John Guirke	Norton	14	1 Lap	
10	(United Kingdom) Jack Bailey	Norton	14	1 Lap	
11	(Northern Ireland) Malcolm Templeton	AJS	14	1 Lap	
12	(Northern Ireland) Harry Turner	Norton	14	1 Lap	
13	(United Kingdom) Douglas Sides	Velocette	13	2 Laps	
14	(United Kingdom) Reg MacDonald	AJS	13	2 Laps	
15	(Sri Lanka) Rally Dean	Norton	13	2 Laps	
16	(United Kingdom) Robert Ferguson	AJS	13	2 Laps	
17	(Italy) Giuseppe Colnago	Gilera	13	2 Laps	
18	(United Kingdom) John Dickson	Velocette	13	2 Laps	
19	(United Kingdom) Robin Fitton	Norton	12	3 Laps	
20	(United Kingdom) Fonsie McGovern	Norton	12	3 Laps	
21	(United Kingdom) J. O. Kerrigan	Triumph	12	3 Laps	
22	(United Kingdom) Stanley Williamson	Norton	12	3 Laps	

== 350 cc classification ==
Pos	Rider	Manufacturer	Laps	Time	Points
1	(Australia) Ken Kavanagh	Norton	13	2:15:43.8	8
2	(Republic of Ireland) Reg Armstrong	Norton	13	+1:22.2	6
3	(New Zealand) Rod Coleman	AJS	13	+3:02.2	4
4	(United Kingdom) Jack Brett	AJS			3
5	(Australia) Ernie Ring	AJS			2
6	(United Kingdom) Mike O'Rourke	AJS			1
7	C. M. Luck	Velocette			
8	(United Kingdom) Robin Sherry	AJS			
9	W. J. Campbell	Norton			
10	J. Bailey	Norton			
11	E. R. Evans	AJS			
12	(United Kingdom) Bill Hall	Velocette			
13	(United Kingdom) Vic Willoughby	Velocette			
14	(United Kingdom) Tom Turner	Norton			
15	A. K. Howth	AJS			
16	L. Starr	AJS			
17	(United Kingdom) Bob Browne	AJS			
18	D. Sides	Velocette			
19	(United Kingdom) Malcolm Templeton	AJS			
20	R. Ferguson	AJS			
21	L. Williams	Norton			
22	K. W. Swallow	Norton			
23	J. McIlwrath	AJS			
24	R. L. MacDonald	AJS			
25	J. G. Dixon	Velocette			
26	A. R. Verity	AJS			
27	R. Dean	Norton			
28	W. R. Evans	AJS			
29	F. Ward	Norton			
30	J. R. T. Upton	Norton			
31	J. Woods	Norton			

== 250 cc classification ==
Pos	Rider	Manufacturer	Laps	Time	Points
1	(United Kingdom) Maurice Cann	Moto Guzzi	12	2:17:52.8	8
2	(Italy) Enrico Lorenzetti	Moto Guzzi	12	+32.2	6
3	(United Kingdom) Leslie Graham	Velocette	12	+3:16.2	4
4	(United Kingdom) Ronald Mead	Velocette			3
5	(United Kingdom) Benny Rood	Velocette			2
6	(United Kingdom) Ray Petty	Norton			1
7	(United Kingdom) David Andrews	Excelsior			
8	T. D. Sloan	Excelsior			
9	(United Kingdom) Chris Tattersall	CTS			
10	(United Kingdom) Jock McCredie	Excelsior			
11	(United Kingdom) Harry Stephen	AJS-Triumph			
12	W. Ferguson	Excelsior			
13	M. Bailey	Excelsior			
14	G. A. Coulter	New Imperial			

== 125cc classification ==
Pos	Rider	Manufacturer	Laps	Time/Retired	Points
1	(United Kingdom) Cecil Sandford	MV Agusta	11	2:20:34.2	8
2	(United Kingdom) Bill Lomas	MV Agusta	11	+2:05.9	6
3	(United Kingdom) Charlie Salt	MV Agusta	10	+1 lap	4
6 starters, 3 finishers

Previous race: 1952 German Grand Prix	FIM Grand Prix World Championship; 1952 season	Next race: 1952 Nations Grand Prix
Previous race: 1951 Ulster Grand Prix	Ulster Grand Prix	Next race: 1953 Ulster Grand Prix
