= Rod Coleman (motorcyclist) =

New Zealand motorcycle racer (1926–2019)

- Nationality: New Zealand
- Born: 19 June 1926
- Died: 6 August 2019 (aged 93); Whanganui, New Zealand
Motorcycle racing career statistics
Grand Prix motorcycle racing
Active years	1951 – 1956
First race	1951 350cc Dutch TT
Last race	1956 250cc Ulster Grand Prix
First win	1954 350cc Isle of Man TT
Last win	1954 350cc Isle of Man TT
Team	AJS
Championships	0
Starts / Wins / Podiums / Poles / F. laps / Points; 26 / 1 / 11 / N/A / 1 / 84

Roderick William Coleman MNZM (19 June 1926 – 6 August 2019) was a Grand Prix motorcycle road racer from New Zealand who raced for AMC (Associated Motorcycles) riding AJS motorcycles both at the Isle of Man TT, and in the Grand Prix World Championship in Europe, between 1951 and 1956. He was the first official entrant from the New Zealand Auto-Cycle Union in the 1949 Isle of Man TT, but crashed in practice, and in 1954 became the first New Zealander to win a TT.

== Background ==
Coleman was the son of Percy "Cannonball" Coleman, also from Whanganui, who first raced at the 1930 Isle of Man TT but retired from the 1930 Junior TT and Senior TT Races. The first New Zealand competitor to enter the TT was Alan Woodman who entered the 1910 Isle of Man TT races, but lost a leg in a practice crash. The "TT Special" of 1951 describes Rod Coleman as a "motorcycle dealer from Whanganui", then aged 25 years.

== Racing career ==
In 1951, Coleman secured a works contract with the British manufacturer, Associated Motorcycles, who produced AJS, and Matchless machines. He rode an AJS to eighth place in the Isle of Man Junior TT, while his Norton failed to finish the Senior TT. In the 1951 Grand Prix season, he finished 12th in the final 350 class standings.

On 27 April 1952, Coleman won the prestigious, pre-season Mettet Grand Prix invitational race. At the 1952 Isle of Man TT he came fourth in the Senior TT, and third in the Junior TT, riding AJS in both events. He was fourth in the 1952 500 class standings.

For 1953, there was a fourth in the Senior TT, and while leading the Junior TT, his bike broke down and failed to finish. For the 1953 season, he was tenth in the 500 class and sixth in the 350 class.

In 1954, Coleman won the Junior, the first New Zealander to win a TT. In the 1954 Grand Prix motorcycle racing season, Coleman came twelfth in the 500 class, and third in the 350 class. This was also the year Associated Motorcycles quit racing. He won the 500cc in Hedemora TT in 1954.

Coleman met and married an English woman, Jacqueline Etherington, and they returned to Whanganui where he ran a thriving motorcycle and car business. He provided financial support for many New Zealand motorcycle racers including; three-times World Champion Hugh Anderson, Keith Turner, Dave and Neville Hiscock, Andrew Stroud, Robert Holden and Dennis Ireland, as well as American rider Pat Hennen and Belgian rider, Gaston Rahier.

In the 2001 New Year Honours, Coleman was appointed a Member of the New Zealand Order of Merit, for services to motorcycling. He died in Whanganui on 6 August 2019.
