= Arthur Wheeler (motorcyclist) =

British motorcycle racer

- Nationality: British
Motorcycle racing career statistics
Grand Prix motorcycle racing
Active years	1949 – 1962
First race	1949 Isle of Man 350 cc Junior TT
Last race	1962 250 cc Argentine Grand Prix
First win	1954 250 cc Nations Grand Prix
Last win	1962 250 cc Argentine Grand Prix
Team	Moto Guzzi
Championships	0
Starts / Wins / Podiums / Poles / F. laps / Points; 27 / 2 / 4 / 0 / 2 / 68

Arthur Frederick Wheeler (5 August 1916 – 16 June 2001) was an English professional Grand Prix motorcycle road racer. Wheeler gained a reputation as one of the top privateer racers on the Grand Prix circuit.

== Early life ==
Born in Epsom, Surrey, Wheeler left school at the age of 15 to be an apprentice electrician and engineer. He began his competitive motorcycling career campaigning a Velocette in grass track racing. Opening a motorcycle shop in 1937, he used his profits to enable his motorcycle racing career. When World War II started, Wheeler's engineering skills led him to being chosen to work alongside Barnes Wallis in developing the bouncing bomb. Wheeler actually has a Road named after him now in Epsom (Wheelers Lane)

== Motorcycle racing career ==
After the war, Wheeler's motorcycle business boomed, allowing him to enter Grands Prix racing on the circuits of Continental Europe. Wheeler won the 1954 250 cc Nations Grand Prix at Monza after the dominant NSU factory racing team withdrew from the race. He was a five-time winner of the North West 200 race in Northern Ireland and won the Leinster 200 at least twice. His best season was aboard a Moto Guzzi in 1962, when he won the 250 cc Argentine Grand Prix and had a fourth-place finish in the Isle of Man Lightweight TT, finishing in third place in the 250 cc world championship behind Jim Redman and Bob McIntyre. At the end of that year he retired at the age of 46. His victory in Argentina made him the oldest rider to have won a Grand Prix motorcycle race in any class, a record that stands to this day.

Wheeler continued to develop the long-outdated Moto Guzzi (which ceased production around 1953) all through his career, using home built streamlined 'dustbin' and 'dolphin' fairings and along with Ken Sprayson at Reynolds tubing (Reynolds Tubes Co Ltd) he developed a spine frame with swinging arm rear suspension and oil bearing top tube. Wheeler was a close friend with many of the Guzzi factory riders, and it was through Fergus Anderson that he acquired his first Guzzi from the factory, a pre-war Albatross 250 cc, which was to be developed through the 1950s to Gambalunghino spec and beyond. After his win at the Nations Grand Prix it was Moto Guzzi factory rider Enrico Lorenzetti who gave Wheeler his stock of factory spare parts, enabling him to campaign the Guzzis long after the official factory team had disbanded. (Note: Motor Cyclist Illustrated, May 1968, p.54 Arthur Wheeler Ltd for all models BSA 45–47–51 Waterloo Road, Epsom. Accessed 6 April 2014)

== Motorcycle Grand Prix results ==
Points system from 1950 to 1968:

Position	1	2	3	4	5	6
Points	8	6	4	3	2	1

(key) (Races in italics indicate fastest lap)

Year	Class	Team	1	2	3	4	5	6	7	8	9	10	11	Points	Rank	Wins
1949	350cc	Velocette	IOM; 20	SUI -	NED -	BEL -	ULS; 10							0	–	0
1949	500cc	Triumph	IOM; NC	SUI -	NED -	BEL -	ULS -	NAT -						0	–	0
1950	350cc	Velocette	IOM; 12	BEL; 16	NED -	SUI -	ULS; 10	NAT -						0	–	0
1950	500cc	Norton	IOM; 26	BEL -	NED -	SUI -	ULS -	NAT -						0	–	0
1951	250cc	Velocette		SUI -	IOM; 5			FRA -	ULS; 3	NAT -				6	7th	0
1951	350cc	Velocette	ESP -	SUI -	IOM; 47	BEL -	NED -	FRA -	ULS -	NAT -				0	–	0
1951	500cc	BSA	ESP -	SUI -	IOM; NC	BEL -	NED -	FRA -	ULS -	NAT -				0	–	0
1952	250cc	Moto Guzzi	SUI -	IOM; 9	NED; 4		GER; 6	ULS -	NAT -					4	12th	0
1952	350cc	Velocette	SUI -	IOM; NC	NED; 12	BEL -	GER -	ULS -	NAT -					0	–	0
1952	500cc	Norton	SUI -	IOM; 21	NED -	BEL -	GER -	ULS -	NAT -	ESP -				0	–	0
1953	250cc	Moto Guzzi	IOM; 4	NED -		GER -		ULS; 6	SUI -	NAT -	ESP -			4	10th	0
1953	350cc	AJS	IOM; 19	NED -	BEL -		FRA -	ULS -	SUI -	NAT -	ESP -			0	–	0
1953	500cc	Matchless	IOM; NC	NED -	BEL -	GER -	FRA -	ULS -	SUI -	NAT -	ESP -			0	–	0
1954	250cc	Moto Guzzi	FRA -	IOM; 7	ULS; 4		NED; 6	GER; 4	SUI -	NAT; 1				15	4th	1
1954	350cc	AJS	FRA -	IOM; 10	ULS -	BEL -	NED -	GER -	SUI -	NAT -	ESP -			0	–	0
1954	500cc	AJS	FRA -	IOM; 28	ULS -	BEL -	NED -	GER -	SUI -	NAT -	ESP -			0	–	0
1955	250cc	Moto Guzzi			IOM; 4	GER; 5		NED; 6	ULS; 7	NAT; 10				6	11th	0
1955	350cc	AJS		FRA -	IOM; 12	GER; 16	BEL; 14	NED -	ULS; 14	NAT; 9				0	–	0
1955	500cc	Matchless	ESP -	FRA -	IOM; 17	GER -	BEL; 15	NED -	ULS -	NAT -				0	–	0
1956	125cc	MV Agusta	IOM; NC	NED -	BEL -	GER -	ULS -	NAT -						0	–	0
1956	250cc	Moto Guzzi	IOM; 6	NED -	BEL -	GER -	ULS; 3	NAT -						5	9th	0
1956	350cc	Moto Guzzi	IOM; 18	NED -	BEL; 11	GER -	ULS -	NAT -						0	–	0
1957	125cc	MV Agusta	GER -	IOM; NC	NED -	BEL -	ULS -	NAT -						0	–	0
1957	250cc	Moto Guzzi	GER -	IOM; 8	NED; 6	BEL; 4	ULS -	NAT -						4	13th	0
1957	350cc	Moto Guzzi	GER -	IOM; 19	NED -	BEL -	ULS -	NAT -						0	–	0
1957	500cc	Moto Guzzi	GER -	IOM; 23	NED -	BEL -	ULS -	NAT -						0	–	0
1958	125cc	Mondial	IOM; 9	NED -	BEL -	GER -	SWE -	ULS; 6	NAT -					1	13th	0
1958	250cc	Mondial	IOM; NC	NED; 5	BEL -	GER -	SWE -	ULS -	NAT -					2	16th	0
1958	350cc	AJS	IOM; NC	NED -	BEL -	GER -	SWE -	ULS -	NAT -					0	–	0
1958	500cc	AJS	IOM; 35	NED -	BEL -	GER -	SWE -	ULS -	NAT -					0	–	0
1959	125cc	NSU		IOM; 7										1	14th	0
1959	125cc	Ducati			GER -	NED -	BEL -	SWE -	ULS; 6	NAT -				1	14th	0
1959	350cc	AJS	FRA -	IOM; 21	GER -		BEL -	SWE -	ULS -	NAT -				0	–	0
1959	500cc	AJS	FRA -	IOM; NC	GER -	NED -	BEL -		ULS -	NAT -				0	–	0
1961	125cc	Ducati	ESP -	GER -	FRA -	IOM; 13	NED -	BEL -	DDR -	ULS -	NAT -	SWE -	ARG -	0	–	0
1961	250cc	Moto Guzzi	ESP -	GER -	FRA -	IOM; 7	NED -	BEL -	DDR -	ULS -	NAT -	SWE -	ARG -	0	–	0
1961	350cc	Moto Guzzi		GER -		IOM; 39	NED -		DDR -	ULS -	NAT -	SWE -		0	–	0
1961	500cc	Matchless		GER -	FRA -	IOM; 27	NED -	BEL -	DDR -	ULS -	NAT -	SWE -	ARG -	0	–	0
1962	250cc	Moto Guzzi	ESP -	FRA -	IOM; 4	NED; 6	BEL; 5	GER; 5	ULS; 4	DDR -	NAT -		ARG; 1	19	3rd	1
1962	350cc	Moto Guzzi			IOM; 23	NED -			ULS -	DDR -	NAT; 6	FIN -		1	17th	0
1962	500cc	Moto Guzzi			IOM; NC	NED -	BEL -		ULS -	DDR -	NAT -	FIN -	ARG -	0	–	0
