= Ken Kavanagh =

Australian motorcycle racer and racing driver (1923–2019)

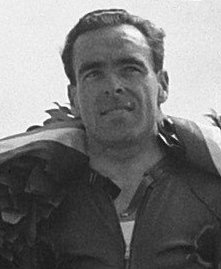
- Born: 12 December 1923; Melbourne, Australia
- Died: 26 November 2019 (aged 95); Bergamo, Italy
Motorcycle racing career statistics
Grand Prix motorcycle racing
Active years	1951 – 1956, 1959 – 1960
First race	1951 Isle of Man 350cc Junior TT
Last race	1960 Isle of Man 125cc Ultra-Lightweight TT
First win	1952 350cc Ulster Grand Prix
Last win	1956 Isle of Man 350cc Junior TT
Team	Moto Guzzi
Starts / Wins / Podiums / Poles / F. laps / Points; 38 / 5 / 24 / 0 / 6 / 170

Formula One World Championship career
- Nationality: (Australia) Australian
- Active years: 1958
- Team: privateer Maserati
- Entries: 2 (0 starts)
- Championships: 0
- Wins: 0
- Podiums: 0
- Career points: 0
- Pole positions: 0
- Fastest laps: 0
- First entry: 1958 Monaco Grand Prix
- Last entry: 1958 Belgian Grand Prix

Thomas Kenrick Kavanagh (12 December 1923 – 26 November 2019) was an Australian Grand Prix motorcycle road racer and racing driver.

In 1952, Kavanagh became the first Australian to win a motorcycle Grand Prix race when he won the 350cc Ulster Grand Prix. In 1956, he won the Junior TT at the Isle of Man TT races. Kavanagh entered two Formula One Grands Prix in 1958 with his own Maserati 250F, firstly in Monaco where he failed to qualify, and lastly in the Belgian Grand Prix where he missed out on the race having blown his engine in practice, after having qualified 20th of 28 entrants.

== Personal life ==
Kavanagh died in Bergamo, Italy on 26 November 2019.

== Motorcycle Grand Prix results ==
Points system from 1950 to 1968

Position	1	2	3	4	5	6
Points	8	6	4	3	2	1

5 best results were counted up until 1955.

(key) (Races in italics indicate fastest lap)

Year	Class	Team	1	2	3	4	5	6	7	8	9	Points	Rank	Wins
1951	350cc	Norton	ESP	SUI	IOM; NC	BEL	NED; 3	FRA	ULS; 2	NAT; 2		16	4th	0
1951	500cc	Norton	ESP	SUI	IOM; NC	BEL	NED	FRA	ULS; 2	NAT		6	9th	0
1952	350cc	Norton	SUI; 7	IOM; NC	NED; 5	BEL	GER; 2	ULS; 1	NAT			16	5th	1
1952	500cc	Norton	SUI	IOM; 32	NED; 3	BEL	GER; 2	ULS	NAT	ESP; 3		14	6th	0
1953	250cc	Moto Guzzi	IOM	NED		GER		ULS	SUI	NAT	ESP; 2	6	6th	0
1953	350cc	Norton	IOM; 2	NED; 3	BEL; 5		FRA	ULS	SUI; 2	NAT	ESP	18	4th	0
1953	500cc	Norton	IOM; NC	NED; 3	BEL; 4	GER	FRA; 4	ULS; 1	SUI	NAT	ESP	18	4th	1
1954	250cc	Moto Guzzi	FRA	IOM; NC	ULS		NED; 4	GER	SUI	NAT		3	13th	0
1954	350cc	Moto Guzzi	FRA	IOM; NC	ULS	BEL; 1	NED	GER	SUI; 2	NAT; 3	ESP	18	4th	1
1954	500cc	Moto Guzzi	FRA	IOM; NC	ULS	BEL; 2	NED	GER; 4	SUI	NAT; 6	ESP; 2	16	3rd	0
1955	350cc	Moto Guzzi		FRA	IOM; NC	GER; 5	BEL	NED; 1	ULS	NAT; 3		14	4th	1
1955	500cc	Moto Guzzi	ESP	FRA	IOM; 3	GER	BEL	NED	ULS	NAT		4	12th	0
1956	350cc	Moto Guzzi	IOM; 1	NED; 5	BEL	GER	ULS	NAT				10	6th	1
1959	125cc	Ducati		IOM; NC	GER	NED; 6	BEL; 5	SWE; 5	ULS; 4	NAT		8	8th	0
1959	500cc	Norton	FRA	IOM	GER; 4	NED	BEL		ULS	NAT		3	11th	0
1960	125cc	Ducati	IOM; NC	NED	BEL	ULS	NAT					0	-	0

== Complete Formula One World Championship results ==
(key)

Year	Entrant	Chassis	Engine	1	2	3	4	5	6	7	8	9	10	11	WDC	Points
1958	Ken Kavanagh	Maserati 250F	Maserati Straight-6	ARG	MON; DNQ	NED	500	BEL; DNS	FRA	GBR	GER	POR	ITA	MOR	NC	0

=== Complete Formula One Non-Championship results ===
(key) (Races in bold indicate pole position) (Races in italics indicate fastest lap)

Year	Entrant	Chassis	Engine	1	2	3	4	5
1958	Ken Kavanagh	Maserati 250F	Maserati Straight-6	GLV; DNS	SYR; 6	AIN; Ret	INT; 18	CAE
1959	Ken Kavanagh	Maserati 250F	Maserati Straight-6	GLV; Ret	AIN; DNA	INT	OUL; DNA	SIL
