= Leslie Graham =

British motorcycle racer

Leslie Graham DFC
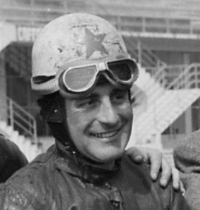
- Nationality: British
- Born: 14 September 1911; Wallasey, Wirral, England
- Died: 12 June 1953 (aged 41); Isle of Man
Motorcycle racing career statistics
Grand Prix motorcycle racing
Active years	1949–1953
First race	1949 500cc Isle of Man TT
Last race	1953 500cc Isle of Man TT
First win	1949 500cc Swiss Grand Prix
Last win	1953 125cc Isle of Man TT
Team(s)	AJS, MV Agusta
Championships	500cc - 1949
Starts / Wins / Podiums / Poles / F. laps / Points; 33 / 8 / 19 / N/A / 5

Robert Leslie Graham DFC (14 September 1911 – 12 June 1953) was a British motorcycle road racer who competed in the 1930s and 1940s. He won the inaugural Grand Prix motorcycle racing 500 cc World Championship in 1949.

== Early career (1929–1939) ==
Graham started racing at Liverpool's Stanley Speedway on dirt. In 1929, he entered a race on the Oswestry Park Hall circuit, riding a second hand Dot-JAP, and came second to Henry Pinnington on an AJS. For the next few years, he raced a succession of Rudge hybrids with varying success.

In 1936, Graham managed to purchase a near new 250 cc OHC OK-Supreme cheaply, because it had dropped a valve. He rebuilt it, and entered it in the 1936 Ulster Grand Prix. After completing a lap of the Clady Circuit, the big end seized. He rebuilt it for 1937, and entered Northern Ireland's North West 200, and led the Lightweights for a while until he came off. He remounted, joined the field, and was running third behind a couple of Excelsiors, when the valve gear broke. He rebuilt the engine again, and won his next race at Donington Park. He then entered the Ulster Grand Prix, and came fourth.

After this, Graham was approached by John Humphries (the son of OK-Supreme's founder) to join the firm, and was given a job assembling the OHC engines. OK-Supreme produced short track racers with JAP engines. Les Graham, Andy McKay, and John Humphries soon became known as the Midlands trio of OK-JAP riders. In the summer of 1938, they raced in the South Eastern Championships on Layhams Farm "mountain mile" grass track. Les took the 20 lap Matchless Trophy, setting a record in the process, despite never having competed on that track before.

Graham came 12th in the 1938 Isle of Man TT Lightweight on an OK-Supreme. In 1939, he entered the IOM TT riding a Rudge engine Chris Tattersal St. Annes (CTS), and was running fourth on the second last lap, when the gearbox broke. Jock West was watching the race, and signed Les up to ride a Velo in 1940, but the War intervened, and that did not happen.

== World War II ==
Graham served as a pilot in the RAF during World War II. He was assigned to the 166 Squadron from 1940, flying Lancaster bombers over Germany. He attained the rank of Flight Lieutenant and was awarded the Distinguished Flying Cross in December 1944 for bravery. Afterwards, he flew with Transport Command, until he was demobilised in 1946.

Graham had an invitation from Wing Commander J.M. ("Jock") West, OBE, to join sales and competition at Associated Motorcycles (AMC).

== Post-war career (1946–1953) ==
Afterwards, Graham returned to racing in the late 1940s as a member of the AJS factory racing team. He competed privately at the first post war Cadwell Park meeting, on a Norton 350, and won. In 1947, on an AJS Porcupine, he managed 9th place in the Senior Isle of Man TT In 1948, he managed a seventh in the Junior, but did not finish in the Senior. That year at Montlhery, Jock West, Les Graham, and French rider Georges Monneret broke 18 world records at speeds between 107 and 111 mph.

The Motorcycle World Championships were first held in 1949, a year before the beginning of the four-wheeler Formula One World Championship. Les was the first winner of the prestigious 500 cc class, riding an AJS Porcupine. The Championship began with Graham leading by 90 seconds in the 1st round, at the 1949 Isle of Man TT. With only a few miles to go, the magneto drive sheared and he pushed home to finish 9th. He won round 2 at Bremgarten in Switzerland and set fastest lap (in year 1 fastest laps counted for 1 point). Round 3 was the Dutch TT where he finished second to Nello Pagani. He failed to finish in round 4 at Spa in Belgium. Round 5 was the Ulster Grand Prix in which he was victorious and collected the fastest lap. The final round was held at Monza in Italy where local hero Nello Pagani on a Gilera won. A rider's best three finishes counted. Graham had two wins & a second, Pagani had two wins & a third. Graham took the title even though Pagani's overall score was higher.

In 1950, Graham finished third behind Italian Umberto Masetti (Gilera) and new star Geoff Duke (Norton) of England. He also competed in the 1950 International Six Days Trial held in Wales on an AJS 350. In 1951, Count Domenico Agusta approached Graham to ride for MV Agusta. Frustrated by a lack of development with the AJS, he joined the Italian team to ride and develop their 500 cc four-cylinder machines. Graham failed to score points for MV in the 500 cc class. While the MVs were very powerful, the handling was not as well sorted, and the bikes were considered a "handful". Agusta were not competing in the 350 cc class, so Graham rode a Velocette MkVIII KTT 350 in competition, finishing 6th in class and winning the Swiss Grand Prix. He also finished 8th in the 125 cc class in 1951

For 1952, Graham began with no points in round 1 in Switzerland, second in the Isle of Man TT though a missed gear change and subsequent loss of power undoubtedly robbed him of a win. Reg Armstrong (Ireland), riding a factory Norton took victory, a very lucky one with Armstrong's chain breaking as he crossed the finish line, with Les Graham 33.4 seconds behind. He failed to score points in the Dutch TT or the Belgian GP. He finished fourth with the fastest lap at Solitude in West Germany. He suffered another non-finish but fastest lap in the Ulster (Tyre tread problems with his Dunlops). He followed this with MV Agusta's first ever 500 cc win plus the fastest lap in front of an enthusiastic Italian crowd at Monza. This was followed by a second win in Spain. He finished the season second to Gilera's Umberto Masetti in the championship. In the 250 cc class, he finished third using Velocette and Benelli machines and claimed 4th in the 125 cc class for MV Agusta.

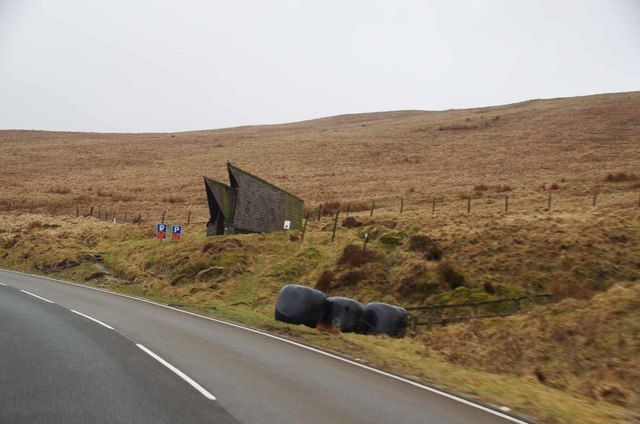
Graham Memorial in 2018

For 1953, Graham was the pre-season favorite and tipped to win the championship again, starting the year with a victory at the prestigious, pre-season Mettet Grand Prix invitational race. At Isle of Man TT, he was finally victorious with a win in the 1953 Lightweight 125 cc class for MV. However, during Friday's Senior TT, he lost control of his bike at high speed, as he took the rise after the bottom of Bray Hill, and was killed instantly. The crash was caused by the bike's forks getting jammed on full compression. Carlo Bandirola and the rest of the MV racing team withdrew from the Championship that year as a mark of respect. The commemorative Graham Memorial shelter was built on the Snaefell mountain road in 1955.

== Motorcycle Grand Prix results ==
1949 point system

Position	1	2	3	4	5	Fastest lap
Points	10	8	7	6	5	1

Points system from 1950 to 1968

Position	1	2	3	4	5	6
Points	8	6	4	3	2	1

5 best results were counted until 1955.

(key) (Races in italics indicate fastest lap)

Year	Class	Team	1	2	3	4	5	6	7	8	9	Points	Rank	Wins
1949	350cc	AJS	IOM; NC	SUI; 2	NED -	BEL -	ULS -					8	7th	0
1949	500cc	AJS	IOM; 10	SUI; 1	NED; 2	BEL; Ret	ULS; 1	NAT; Ret				30	1st	2
1950	350cc	AJS	IOM; 4	BEL -	NED -	SUI; 1	ULS -	NAT; 2				17	3rd	1
1950	500cc	AJS	IOM; 4	BEL -	NED -	SUI; 1	ULS; 2	NAT -				17	3rd	1
1951	125cc	MV Agusta	ESP -		IOM; NC		NED; 3		ULS -	NAT -		4	8th	0
1951	350cc	Velocette	ESP; 2	SUI; 1	IOM; 10	BEL -	NED -	FRA -	ULS -	NAT -		14	6th	1
1951	500cc	MV Agusta	ESP -	SUI -	IOM; NC	BEL -	NED -	FRA -	ULS -	NAT -		0	-	0
1952	125cc	MV Agusta		IOM -	NED -		GER -	ULS -	NAT; 3	ESP; 2		10	4th	0
1952	250cc	Velocette	SUI; 3	IOM; 4	NED -		GER -	ULS; 3	NAT -			11	3rd	0
1952	350cc	Velocette	SUI -	IOM; NC	NED; 7	BEL; 6	GER -	ULS -	NAT -			1	13th	0
1952	500cc	MV Agusta	SUI -	IOM; 2	NED; 7	BEL -	GER; 4	ULS -	NAT; 1	ESP; 1		25	2nd	2
1953	125cc	MV Agusta	IOM; 1	NED -		GER -		ULS -		NAT -	ESP -	8	5th	1
1953	350cc	MV Agusta	IOM; NC	NED -	BEL -		FRA -	ULS -	SUI -	NAT -	ESP -	0	-	0
1953	500cc	MV Agusta	IOM; NC	NED -	BEL -	GER -	FRA -	ULS -	SUI -	NAT -	ESP -	0	-	0
