= 1952 Grand Prix motorcycle racing season =

Sports season

1952 F.I.M. Grand Prix motorcycle racing season

Seasons
- ← 1951 1953 →

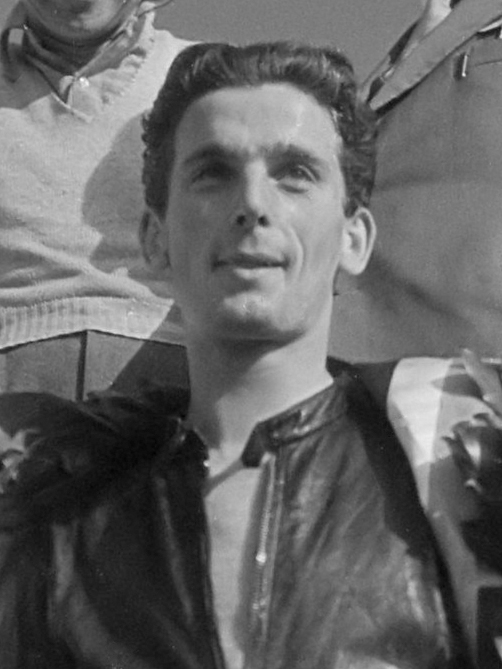
Umberto Masetti won his second and final 500cc World Championship title in 1952.

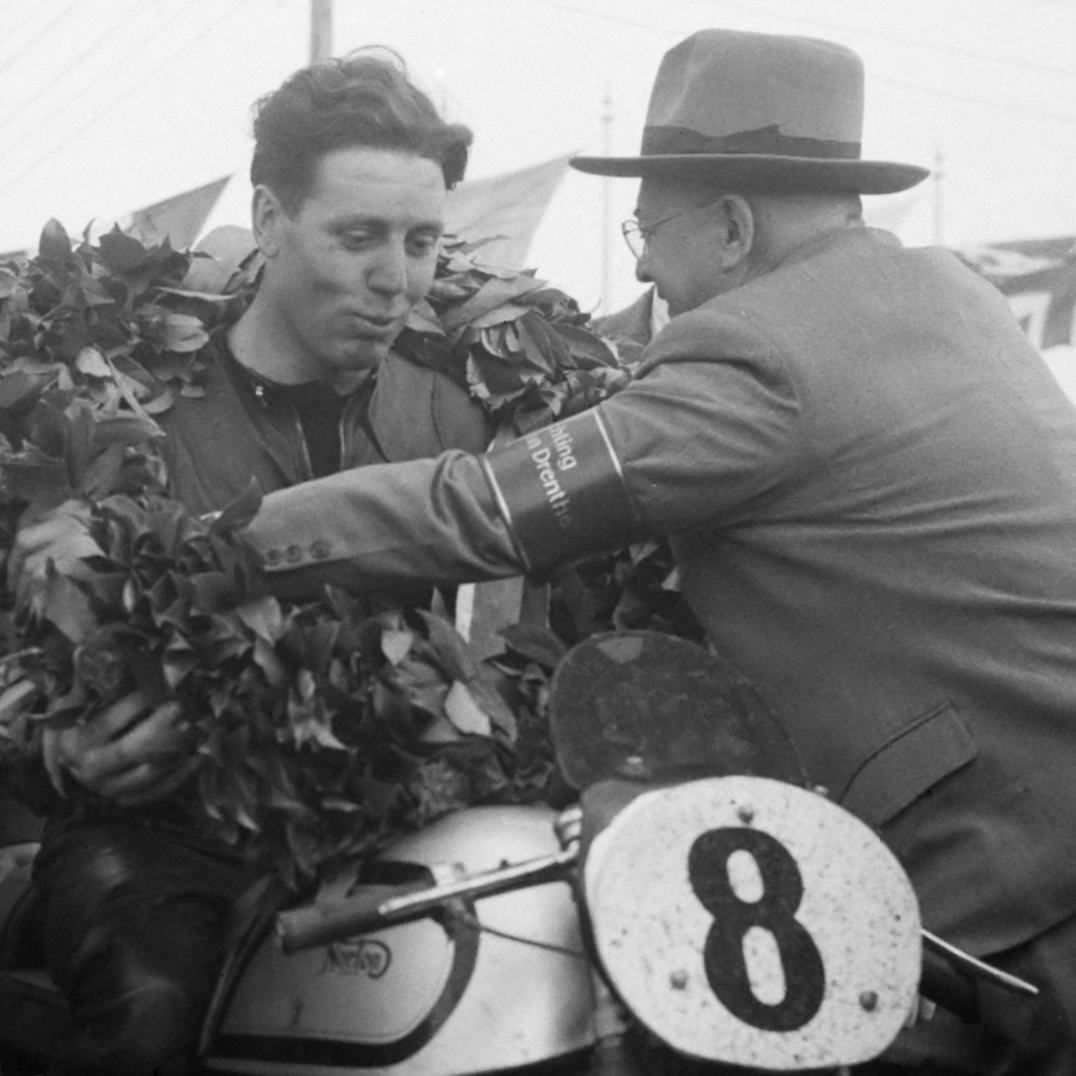
Geoff Duke (pictured in 1951) successfully defended his 350cc World Championship title.

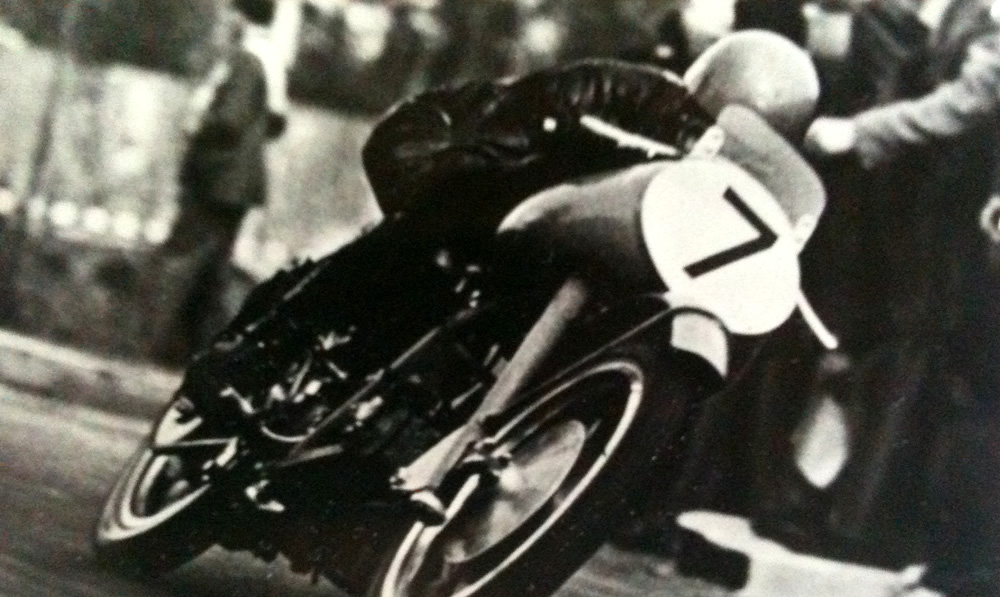
Enrico Lorenzetti won his only world championship in the 250cc class.

The 1952 Grand Prix motorcycle racing season was the fourth F.I.M. Road Racing World Championship Grand Prix season. The season consisted of eight Grand Prix races in five classes: 500cc, 350cc, 250cc, 125cc and Sidecars 500cc. It began on 18 May, with Swiss Grand Prix and ended with Spanish Grand Prix on 5 October.

The first FIM Grand Prix race on German soil since the end of the Second World War was held at the Solitude Racetrack. The Grand Prix race offered people a moment of respite in war ravaged Germany and, an estimated crowd of 400,000 spectators witnessed Reg Armstrong win both the 350 and 500 cc races for the Norton factory. The attendance is considered to be one of the largest ever to watch a Motorcycle Grand Prix.

== 1952 Grand Prix season calendar ==
Round	Date	Grand Prix	Circuit	125cc winner	250cc winner	350cc winner	500cc winner	Sidecars 500cc winner	Report
1	18 May	(Switzerland) Swiss Grand Prix	Bremgarten		(United Kingdom) Fergus Anderson	(United Kingdom) Geoff Duke	(United Kingdom) Jack Brett	(Italy) Milani / Pizzocri	Report
2	13 June	Isle of Man TT	Snaefell Mountain	(United Kingdom) Cecil Sandford	(United Kingdom) Fergus Anderson	(United Kingdom) Geoff Duke	(Republic of Ireland) Reg Armstrong		Report
3	28 June	(Netherlands) Dutch TT	Assen	(United Kingdom) Cecil Sandford	(Italy) Enrico Lorenzetti	(United Kingdom) Geoff Duke	(Italy) Umberto Masetti		Report
4	6 July	(Belgium) Belgian Grand Prix	Spa-Francorchamps			(United Kingdom) Geoff Duke	(Italy) Umberto Masetti	(United Kingdom) Oliver / Price	Report
5	20 July	(West Germany) German Grand Prix	Solitude	(West Germany) Werner Haas	(West Germany) Rudi Felgenheier	(Republic of Ireland) Reg Armstrong	(Republic of Ireland) Reg Armstrong	(United Kingdom) Smith / Clements	Report
6	16 August	(Northern Ireland) Ulster Grand Prix	Clady	(United Kingdom) Cecil Sandford	(United Kingdom) Maurice Cann	(Australia) Ken Kavanagh	(United Kingdom) Cromie McCandless		Report
7	14 September	(Italy) Nations Grand Prix	Monza	(Italy) Emilio Mendogni	(Italy) Enrico Lorenzetti	(Southern Rhodesia) Ray Amm	(United Kingdom) Leslie Graham	(Italy) Merlo / Magri	Report
8	5 October	(Spain) Spanish Grand Prix	Montjuïc	(Italy) Emilio Mendogni			(United Kingdom) Leslie Graham	(United Kingdom) (Italy) Oliver / Dobelli	Report

== Standings ==
=== Scoring system ===
Points were awarded to the top six finishers in each race. Only the four best races counted in the Sidecars, 125cc and 250cc, while in the 350cc and 500cc championships, the five best results counted.

Position	1st	2nd	3rd	4th	5th	6th
Points	8	6	4	3	2	1

=== 500cc final standings ===
Pos	Rider	Machine	SUI (Switzerland)	MAN (United Kingdom)	HOL (Netherlands)	BEL (Belgium)	GER (Germany)	ULS (Ulster)	NAC (Italy)	ESP (Spain)	Pts
1	(Italy) Umberto Masetti	Gilera	Ret		1	1	Ret	Ret	2	**2**	**28**
2	(United Kingdom) Leslie Graham	MV Agusta	Ret	2	7	Ret	4	Ret	1	1	**25**
3	(Republic of Ireland) Reg Armstrong	Norton	Ret	1	4	Ret	1	Ret	6	5	**22**
4	(New Zealand) Rod Coleman	AJS	5	4	5	5	Ret	2	Ret		**15**
5	(United Kingdom) Jack Brett	AJS / Norton	1	Ret	9	4	Ret	4	7		**14**
6	(Australia) Ken Kavanagh	Norton		32	3		2	Ret		3	**14**
7	(United Kingdom) Geoff Duke	Norton	Ret	**Ret**	2	2					**12**
8	(Italy) Nello Pagani	Gilera	4		6	6			3	4	**12**
9	(Northern Ireland) Cromie McCandless	Norton / Gilera		6				1			**9**
10	(Southern Rhodesia) Ray Amm	Norton	6	3	Ret	3			Ret	9	**9**
11	(Italy) Carlo Bandirola	MV Agusta	3		Ret	Ret	Ret		4	Ret	**7**
12	(United Kingdom) Bill Doran	AJS	2								**6**
13	(United Kingdom) Bill Lomas	AJS / MV Agusta		5		Ret	Ret	3	Ret	Ret	**6**
14	(United Kingdom) Sid Lawton	Norton / AJS	8	12	Ret		3	Ret		6	**5**
15	(Belgium) Auguste Goffin	Norton				7	5		Ret	Ret	**2**
16	(Northern Ireland) Peter Carter	Norton		10				5			**2**
17	(Italy) Giuseppe Colnago	Gilera						17	5	Ret	**2**
18	(Germany) Hans Baltisberger	BMW					6			Ret	**1**
19	(United Kingdom) John Surtees	Norton						6			**1**
20	(Italy) Libero Liberati	Gilera	7		8				8	16	**0**
21	(Germany) Siegfried Wünsche	BMW / DKW					11			7	**0**
22	(Australia) Tony McAlpine	Norton		13	Ret		7		Ret		**0**
23	(United Kingdom) Roy Evans	Norton		14				7			**0**
24	(United Kingdom) George Brown	Norton		7				Ret			**0**
25	(United Kingdom) Robin Sherry	Norton / AJS		Ret		8		Ret	9		**0**
26	(New Zealand) Ken Mudford	Norton		8	10						**0**
27	(East Germany) Karl Rührschneck	Norton					8			Ret	**0**
28	(Spain) Fernando Aranda	Gilera								8	**0**
=	(Northern Ireland) William Campbell	Norton						8			**0**
30	(Netherlands) Lous van Riswijk	Matchless / Norton			11	9					0
31	(Germany) Siegfried Fuss	Norton					9				0
=	(Northern Ireland) John Guirke	Norton						9			**0**
=	(United Kingdom) Alain Lawton	Norton								9	**0**
=	(Switzerland) Willy Lips	Norton	9								**0**
=	(United Kingdom) Albert Moule	Norton		9							**0**
36	(Germany) Rudi Knees	Norton					10			11	**0**
37	(Gibraltar) John Grace	Norton		16						10	**0**
38	(United Kingdom) Jack Bailey	Norton		Ret				10			**0**
=	(Germany) Friedel Schön	Horex	10				Ret				**0**
40	(Belgium) Francis Basso	Norton				10					**0**
=	(Italy) Martino Giani	MV Agusta							10		**0**
42	(United Kingdom) Humphrey Ranson	Norton		17	Ret	11					**0**
43	(Italy) Enrico Galante	Norton							11		**0**
=	(Northern Ireland) Malcolm Templeton	AJS						11			**0**
=	(United Kingdom) Vic Willoughby	Norton		11							**0**
=	(Switzerland) Hans Wirz	Triumph	11								**0**
47	(United Kingdom) Bill Beevers	Norton	12	Ret							**0**
48	(Italy) Francesco Guglielminetti	MV Agusta							12		**0**
=	(United Kingdom) Herbert Ranson	Norton								12	**0**
=	(United Kingdom) Geoff Read	Norton			12						**0**
=	(Belgium) Edouard Texidor	Norton				12					**0**
=	(Northern Ireland) Harry Turner	Norton						12			**0**
53	(Spain) Javier de Ortueta	Norton							13	Ret	**0**
54	(Netherlands) Piet Bakker	BMW			13						**0**
=	(Switzerland) Massimo Forster	Gilera	13								**0**
=	(Germany) Ewald Kluge	DKW								13	**0**
=	(United Kingdom) Douglas Sides	Velocette						13			**0**
58	(Switzerland) Carletto Bellotti	Moto Guzzi	14								**0**
=	(Republic of Ireland) Harry Lindsay	Triumph								14	**0**
=	(United Kingdom) Reg MacDonald	AJS						14			**0**
=	(Netherlands) Drikus Veer	Triumph			14						**0**
62	(Dominion of Ceylon) Rally Dean	Norton		Ret	Ret			15			**0**
63	(Austria) Siegfried Vogel	Norton								15	**0**
=	(United Kingdom) Don Williams	Norton		15							**0**
65	(United Kingdom) Robert Ferguson	AJS		16							**0**
66	(United Kingdom) John Dickson	Velocette						18			**0**
=	(United Kingdom) Charlie Salt	BSA		18							**0**
68	(United Kingdom) Robin Fitton	Norton						19			**0**
=	(United Kingdom) Cyril Stevens	Norton		19							**0**
70	(United Kingdom) Fonsie McGovern	Norton						20			**0**
=	(United Kingdom) Frank Norris	Norton		20							**0**
72	(United Kingdom) Arthur Wheeler	Norton		21	Ret			Ret			**0**
73	(United Kingdom) J. O. Kerrigan	Triumph						21			**0**
74	(United Kingdom) Ken Swallow	Norton		22							**0**
75	(United Kingdom) Syl Anderton	Norton		23							**0**
76	(United Kingdom) Les Dear	Norton		24							**0**
77	(Denmark) Sven Sørensen	Norton		25							**0**
78	(United Kingdom) Howard Grindley	Norton		26							**0**
79	(United Kingdom) Jack Varlow	Norton		27							**0**
80	(United Kingdom) Harry Stephen	Norton		28							**0**
81	(United Kingdom) Leo Starr	AJS		29							**0**
82	(United Kingdom) Dennis Lashmar	Norton		30							**0**
83	(Dominion of Ceylon) David Stevenson	AJS		31							**0**
84	(United Kingdom) Leslie Harris	Norton	Ret	33							**0**
85	(United Kingdom) Leslie Barrett	Norton		34							**0**
86	(United Kingdom) John Fisher	AJS		35							**0**
87	(United Kingdom) Joe Glazebrook	Norton		36							**0**
88	(United Kingdom) Jack Harding	Norton		37							**0**
89	(United Kingdom) Eric Hardy	AJS		38							**0**
90	(Canada) Ivor Wagar	Triumph		39							**0**
91	(United Kingdom) Bob McDonald	AJS		40							**0**
92	(Northern Ireland) Charlie Gray	AJS		41							**0**
–	(United Kingdom) Phil Heath	Vincent / Norton		Ret			Ret		Ret	Ret	
–	(Northern Ireland) Bob Matthews	Norton / Matchless	Ret		Ret					Ret	0
–	(Italy) Alfredo Milani	Gilera	Ret		Ret	Ret					0
–	(Australia) Ernie Ring	Matchless		Ret	Ret	Ret					**0**
–	(Belgium) Charles Bruguiere	Norton				Ret				Ret	**0**
–	(France) Georges Burgaff	Norton							Ret	Ret	**0**
–	(Switzerland) Werner Gerber	Horex	Ret				Ret				**0**
–	(New Zealand) Dean Hollier	Norton		Ret	Ret						**0**
–	(United Kingdom) Sidney Mason	Norton	Ret		Ret						**0**
–	(United Kingdom) Bill Petch	Norton					Ret			DNS	**0**
–	(Italy) Emilio Soprani	Gilera							Ret	DNS	**0**
–	(Switzerland) Jost Albisser	Rudge	Ret								**0**
–	(United Kingdom) Syd Barnett	Norton		Ret							**0**
–	(East Germany) Edgar Barth	Norton					Ret				**0**
–	(Italy) Felice Benasedo	Moto Guzzi					Ret				**0**
–	(United Kingdom) David Bennett	Norton	Ret								**0**
–	(United Kingdom) Wilf Billington	Norton		Ret							**0**
–	(United Kingdom) George Brockerton	Bitza						Ret			**0**
–	(Northern Ireland) Louis Carter	Norton						Ret			**0**
–	(France) Jacques Collot	Norton								Ret	**0**
–	(Belgium) Firmin Dauwe	Norton					Ret				**0**
–	(Italy) Lodovico Facchinelli	Gilera							Ret		**0**
–	(United Kingdom) Archie Fenn	Norton		Ret							**0**
–	(Dominion of Ceylon) Peter Fernando	Norton		Ret							**0**
–	(Netherlands) Cees Fokke-Bosch	Norton			Ret						**0**
–	(Italy) Tito Forconi	MV Agusta							Ret		**0**
–	(United Kingdom) Sid Franklen	AJS		Ret							**0**
–	(Canada) Roy Godwin	Norton		Ret							**0**
–	(Germany) Ernst Gross	BMW					Ret				**0**
–	(United Kingdom) Bill Hall	Norton		Ret							**0**
–	(Germany) Ernst Hoske	Horex					Ret				**0**
–	(United Kingdom) Robert King	Norton		Ret							**0**
–	(United Kingdom) John Maloney	Vincent		Ret							**0**
–	(Austria) Alex Mayer	Norton								Ret	**0**
–	(United Kingdom) Tommy McEwan	Norton		Ret							**0**
–	(Germany) Gerhard Mette	BMW					Ret				**0**
–	(United Kingdom) Stan Miller	Norton		Ret							**0**
–	(United Kingdom) Eric Oliver	Norton								Ret	**0**
–	(United Kingdom) Ashley Parry	Norton		Ret							**0**
–	(United Kingdom) Roland Pike	BSA		Ret							**0**
–	(United Kingdom) Arthur Pollitt	Norton		Ret							**0**
–	(United Kingdom) Mark Prudence	Norton		Ret							**0**
–	(United Kingdom) Bob Rowbottom	AJS		Ret							**0**
–	(United Kingdom) Cecil Sandford	BSA		Ret							**0**
–	(United Kingdom) Simon Sandys-Winsch	Velocette			Ret						**0**
–	(Netherlands) Lodewijk Simons	Norton			Ret						**0**
–	(Netherlands) Henk Steman	Norton			Ret						**0**
–	(Northern Rhodesia) Norman Stewart	Norton		Ret							**0**
–	(United Kingdom) Les Tedder	AJS		Ret							**0**
–	(United Kingdom) Roy Walker	BSA		Ret							**0**
–	(United Kingdom) Dick Ward	Velocette		Ret							**0**
–	(United Kingdom) Leonard Williams	Velocette		Ret							**0**
–	(Isle of Wight) Tommy Wood	Norton				Ret					**0**
–	(Germany) Gerhard Pohlers	BMW								DNS	**0**
Pos	Rider	Bike	SUI (Switzerland)	MAN (United Kingdom)	HOL (Netherlands)	BEL (Belgium)	GER (Germany)	ULS (Ulster)	NAC (Italy)	ESP (Spain)	Pts

Colour	Result
Gold	Winner
Silver	Second place
Bronze	Third place
Green	Points classification
Blue	Non-points classification
Blue	Non-classified finish (NC)
Purple	Retired, not classified (Ret)
Red	Did not qualify (DNQ)
Red	Did not pre-qualify (DNPQ)
Black	Disqualified (DSQ)
White	Did not start (DNS)
White	Withdrew (WD)
White	Race cancelled (C)
Blank	Did not practice (DNP)
Blank	Did not arrive (DNA)
Blank	Excluded (EX)

**Bold** – Pole
Italics – Fastest Lap

=== 350cc Standings ===
Place	Rider	Number	Country	Machine	Points	Wins
1	(United Kingdom) Geoff Duke		United Kingdom	Norton	32	4
2	(Republic of Ireland) Reg Armstrong		Ireland	Norton	24	1
3	(Southern Rhodesia) Ray Amm		Southern Rhodesia	Norton	21	1
4	(New Zealand) Rod Coleman		New Zealand	AJS	20	0
5	(Australia) Ken Kavanagh		Australia	Norton	16	1
6	(United Kingdom) Jack Brett		United Kingdom	AJS	12	0
7	(United Kingdom) Bill Lomas		United Kingdom	AJS	9	0
8	(United Kingdom) Sid Lawton		United Kingdom	AJS	7	0
9	(United Kingdom) Robin Sherry		United Kingdom	AJS	4	0
10	(Austria) Ernie Ring		Austria	AJS	3	0
11	(West Germany) Ewald Kluge		Germany	DKW	2	0
=	(Belgium) Auguste Goffin		Belgium	Norton	2	0
13	(United Kingdom) Leslie Graham		United Kingdom	Velocette	1	0
=	(Republic of Ireland) Mike O'Rourke		Ireland	AJS	1	0
=	(United Kingdom) George Brown		United Kingdom	AJS	1	0
=	(West Germany) Roland Schnell		Germany	Horex	1	0

=== 250cc Standings ===
Place	Rider	Number	Country	Machine	Points	Wins
1	(Italy) Enrico Lorenzetti		Italy	Moto Guzzi	28	2
2	(United Kingdom) Fergus Anderson		United Kingdom	Moto Guzzi	24	2
3	(United Kingdom) Leslie Graham		United Kingdom	Velocette	11	0
4	(United Kingdom) Maurice Cann		United Kingdom	Moto Guzzi	10	1
5	(West Germany) Rudi Felgenheier		Germany	DKW	8	1
6	(Italy) Bruno Ruffo		Italy	Moto Guzzi	7	0
7	(West Germany) Werner Haas		Germany	NSU	6	0
=	(West Germany) Heinrich Thorn-Prikker		Germany	Moto Guzzi	6	0
=	(Italy) Alano Montanari		Italy	Moto Guzzi	6	0
10	(West Germany) Herman Gablenz		Germany	Horex	4	0
=	(United Kingdom) Sid Lawton		United Kingdom	Moto Guzzi	4	0
=	(United Kingdom) Arthur Wheeler		United Kingdom	Moto Guzzi	4	0
13	(West Germany) Ewald Kluge		Germany	DKW	3	0
=	(United Kingdom) Ronald Mead		United Kingdom	Velocette	3	0
=	(West Germany) Gotthilf Gehring		Germany	Moto Guzzi	3	0
16	(Italy) Roberto Colombo		Italy	NSU	2	0
=	(United Kingdom) Bill Webster		United Kingdom	Velocette	2	0
=	(Italy) Nino Grieco		Italy	Parilla	2	0
=	(United Kingdom) Benny Rood		United Kingdom	Velocette	2	0
20	(Italy) Bruno Francisci		Italy	Moto Guzzi	1	0
=	(United Kingdom) Ray Petty		United Kingdom	Norton	1	0
=	(Netherlands) Sieb Postma		Netherlands	Moto Guzzi	1	0

=== 125cc ===
==== Riders' standings ====
Pos.	Rider	Bike	MAN (United Kingdom)	NED (Netherlands)	GER (Germany)	ULS (Ulster)	NAT (Italy)	ESP (Spain)	Pts
1	(United Kingdom) Cecil Sandford	MV Agusta	1**^{F}**	1**^{F}**	3	1**^{F}**		3	28 (32)
2	(Italy) Carlo Ubbiali	Mondial	2	2	2		2		24
3	(Italy) Emilio Mendogni	Morini					1	1**^{F}**	16
4	(United Kingdom) Leslie Graham	MV Agusta					3	2	10
5	(Italy) Luigi Zinzani	Morini		3	6		4	6	9
6	(West Germany) Werner Haas	NSU			1**^{F}**				8
7	(Italy) Angelo Copeta	MV Agusta	5	5	4				7
8	(United Kingdom) Bill Lomas	MV Agusta				2			6
9	(Italy) Guido Sala	MV Agusta		4			5**^{F}**		5
10	(United Kingdom) Len Parry	Mondial	3						4
10	(United Kingdom) Charlie Salt	MV Agusta				3			4
12	(United Kingdom) Cromie McCandless	Mondial	4						3
12	(Italy) Romolo Ferri	Morini						4	3
14	(West Germany) Hubert Luttenberger	NSU			5		6		3
15	(West Germany) Hermann Paul Müller	Mondial						5	2
16	(United Kingdom) Frank Burman	EMC-Puch	6						1
16	(Netherlands) Lo Simons	Mondial		6					1
Pos.	Rider	Bike	MAN (United Kingdom)	NED (Netherlands)	GER (Germany)	ULS (Ulster)	NAT (Italy)	ESP (Spain)	Pts

Race key
Colour	Result
Gold	Winner
Silver	2nd place
Bronze	3rd place
Green	Points finish
Blue	Non-points finish
Blue	Non-classified finish (NC)
Purple	Retired (Ret)
Red	Did not qualify (DNQ)
Black	Disqualified (DSQ)
White	Did not start (DNS)
White	Withdrew (WD)
White	Race cancelled (C)
Blank	Did not practice (DNP)
Blank	Excluded (EX)
Blank	Did not arrive (DNA)
Blank	Did not enter (empty cell)
Annotation	Meaning
P	Pole position
F	Fastest lap
Rider key
Colour	Meaning
Light blue	Rookie rider

==== Constructors' standings ====
Each constructor is awarded the same number of points as their best placed rider in each race.

Pos.	Constructor	MAN (United Kingdom)	NED (Netherlands)	GER (Germany)	ULS (Ulster)	NAT (Italy)	ESP (Spain)	Pts
1	(Italy) MV Agusta	1	1	3	1	3	2	30 (38)
2	(Italy) Mondial	2	2	2		2	5	24 (26)
3	(Italy) Morini		3	6		1	1	21
4	(West Germany) NSU			1		6		9
5	(United Kingdom) EMC-Puch	6						1
Pos.	Constructor	MAN (United Kingdom)	NED (Netherlands)	GER (Germany)	ULS (Ulster)	NAT (Italy)	ESP (Spain)	Pts
