= 1952 Dutch TT =

Motorcycle grand prix

(Netherlands) 1952 Dutch TT
Race details
- Race 3 of 8 races in the 1952 Grand Prix motorcycle racing season
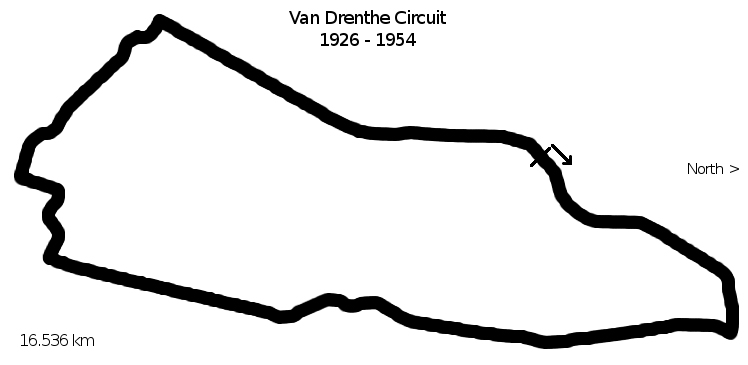
- Date: 28 June 1952
- Location: TT Circuit Assen
- Course: Permanent racing facility; 16.536 km (10.275 mi)

500cc
- Rider
Fastest lap
Rider	(Italy) Umberto Masetti	Gilera
Time	6:08.7	
Podium
First	(Italy) Umberto Masetti	Gilera
Second	(United Kingdom) Geoff Duke	Norton
Third	(Australia) Ken Kavanagh	Norton

350cc
- Rider
Fastest lap
Rider	(United Kingdom) Geoff Duke	Norton
Time	6:30.6	
Podium
First	(United Kingdom) Geoff Duke	Norton
Second	(Southern Rhodesia) Ray Amm	Norton
Third	(New Zealand) Rod Coleman	AJS

250cc
- Rider
Fastest lap
Rider	(Italy) Bruno Ruffo	Moto Guzzi
Time	6:59.9	
Podium
First	(Italy) Enrico Lorenzetti	Moto Guzzi
Second	(Italy) Bruno Ruffo	Moto Guzzi
Third	(United Kingdom) Fergus Anderson	Moto Guzzi

125cc
- Rider
Fastest lap
Rider	(United Kingdom) Cecil Sandford	MV Agusta
Time	7:44.6	
Podium
First	(United Kingdom) Cecil Sandford	MV Agusta
Second	(Italy) Carlo Ubbiali	Mondial
Third	(Italy) Luigi Zinzani	Moto Morini

The 1952 Dutch motorcycle Grand Prix was the third race of the 1952 Motorcycle Grand Prix season. It took place on the weekend of 28 June 1952 at the Assen circuit.

== 500 cc classification ==
Pos	Rider	Manufacturer	Laps	Time	Points
1	(Italy) Umberto Masetti	Gilera	16	1:41:28.9	8
2	(United Kingdom) Geoff Duke	Norton	16	+1.2	6
3	(Australia) Ken Kavanagh	Norton	16	+1:08.2	4
4	(Republic of Ireland) Reg Armstrong	Norton			3
5	(New Zealand) Rod Coleman	AJS			2
6	(Italy) Nello Pagani	Gilera			1
7	(United Kingdom) Leslie Graham	MV Agusta			
8	(Italy) Libero Liberati	Gilera			
9	(United Kingdom) Jack Brett	AJS			
10	(New Zealand) Ken Mudford	Norton			
11	(Netherlands) Louis van Rijswijk	Matchless			
12	(United Kingdom) Geoff E. Read	Norton			
13	(Netherlands) Piet Bakker	BMW			
14	(Netherlands) Drikus Veer	Triumph			

== 350 cc classification ==
Pos	Rider	Manufacturer	Laps	Time	Points
1	(United Kingdom) Geoff Duke	Norton	12	1:19:31.9	8
2	(Southern Rhodesia) Ray Amm	Norton	12	+14.3	6
3	(New Zealand) Rod Coleman	AJS	12	+15.7	4
4	(Republic of Ireland) Reg Armstrong	Norton			3
5	(Australia) Ken Kavanagh	Norton			2
6	(United Kingdom) Jack Brett	AJS			1
7	(United Kingdom) Leslie Graham	Velocette			
8	(United Kingdom) Syd Lawton	AJS			
9	(New Zealand) Ken Mudford	AJS			
10	(New Zealand) Dene Hollier	Norton			
11	(United Kingdom) Ken Harwood	AJS			
12	(United Kingdom) Arthur Wheeler	Velocette			
13	(Netherlands) Louis van Rijswijk	Velocette			
14	(United Kingdom) Bob Matthews	Velocette			
15	(United Kingdom) Humphrey Ranson	AJS			
16	(United Kingdom) Sid Mason	Velocette			
17	(Netherlands) Cees Fokke Bosch	AJS			
18	(Netherlands) Anton Elbersen	AJS			
19	P. Fernando	Norton			
20	(Netherlands) Gerrit Poel	Velocette			

== 250 cc classification ==
Pos	Rider	Manufacturer	Laps	Time	Points
1	(Italy) Enrico Lorenzetti	Moto Guzzi	10	1:12:30.3	8
2	(Italy) Bruno Ruffo	Moto Guzzi	10	+0.6	6
3	(United Kingdom) Fergus Anderson	Moto Guzzi	10	+51.8	4
4	(United Kingdom) Arthur Wheeler	Moto Guzzi			3
5	(United Kingdom) Bill Webster	Velocette			2
6	(Netherlands) Sieb Postma	Moto Guzzi			1
7	(Netherlands) Hank Steman	Excelsior			
8	(United Kingdom) Fron Purslow	Norton			

== 125cc classification ==
Pos.	Rider	Manufacturer	Laps	Time/Retired	Points
1	(United Kingdom) Cecil Sandford	MV Agusta	7	54:43.6	8
2	(Italy) Carlo Ubbiali	Mondial	7	+25.1	6
3	(Italy) Luigi Zinzani	Moto Morini	7	+38.4	4
4	(Italy) Guido Sala	MV Agusta	7	+1:31.3	3
5	(Italy) Angelo Copeta	MV Agusta	7	+3:17.3	2
6	(Netherlands) Lo Simons	Mondial	7	+5:44.0	1
7	(Netherlands) Dick Renooy	Eysink			
8	(Netherlands) Tonnie Heinemann	Eysink			
9	(Netherlands) H. D. van der Waerdt	Eysink			
10	(Netherlands) Mobi Vierdag	Eysink			
11	(Netherlands) Jan Rietveld	Eysink			
12	W. Regtars	Puch			
13	W. van der Eijk	Moto Morini			
23 starters, 13 finishers

Previous race: 1952 Isle of Man TT	FIM Grand Prix World Championship; 1952 season	Next race: 1952 Belgian Grand Prix
Previous race: 1951 Dutch TT	Dutch TT	Next race: 1953 Dutch TT
