= Umberto Masetti =

Italian motorcycle racer (1926–2006)

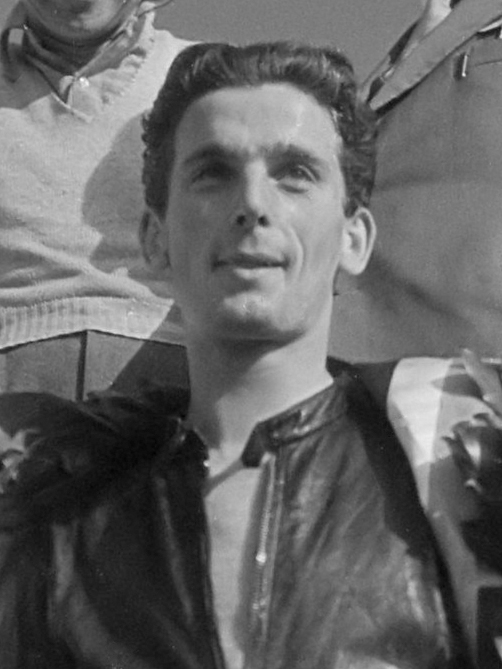
- Umberto Masetti in 1952
- Nationality: (Italy) Italian
- Born: 4 May 1926; Borgo delle Rose, Province of Parma, Kingdom of Italy
- Died: 28 May 2006 (aged 80); Maranello, Italy
Motorcycle racing career statistics
Grand Prix motorcycle racing
Active years	1949 – 1958
First race	1949 125cc Swiss Grand Prix
Last race	1958 500cc Nations Grand Prix
First win	1950 500cc Belgian Grand Prix
Last win	1955 500cc Nations Grand Prix
Team(s)	Benelli, Morini, Gilera, MV Agusta
Championships	500cc – 1950, 1952
Starts / Wins / Podiums / Poles / F. laps / Points; 31 / 6 / 21 / N/A / 1

Umberto Masetti (4 May 1926 – 28 May 2006) was an Italian professional motorcycle road racer. He competed in the FIM Grand Prix motorcycle racing world championships from 1949 to 1958, most prominently as a member of the Gilera factory racing team where he won the 1950 and 1952 500cc world championships. Masetti was the first Italian to win the 500cc World Championship.

== Career ==
Masetti was born in Borgo delle Rose, in the province of Parma.

Masetti debuted in the Grand Prix motorcycle World Championship in 1949 aboard a Moto Morini, in the 125cc class. In the same year, he also raced a Benelli in the 250cc class and a Gilera in the 500cc class.

In 1950, Masetti won the Grands Prix of Belgium and the Netherlands and defeated Geoff Duke for the 500cc World Championship. In 1952, still with Gilera, he was again World Champion, again taking victories in Belgium and the Netherlands.

In 1953, Masetti raced in the 250cc class for NSU, but an accident at Imola prevented him from taking part for much of the season. In 1954, Masetti was again in the 500cc class with Gilera. In 1955, he divided his time between the 250cc and 500cc classes, this time for the MV Agusta factory, with whom he raced for until 1958. That year, after an unsuccessful season in the 500cc class, he retired from motorcycle competition.

Masetti then lived in Maranello, where he died in 2006.

== Motorcycle Grand Prix results ==
1949 point system:

Position	1	2	3	4	5	Fastest lap
Points	10	8	7	6	5	1

Points system from 1950 to 1968:

Position	1	2	3	4	5	6
Points	8	6	4	3	2	1

(key) (Races in italics indicate fastest lap)

Year	Class	Team	1	2	3	4	5	6	7	8	9	Points	Rank	Wins
1949	125cc	Moto Morini		SUI; 5	NED -		NAT; 2					13	3rd	0
1949	250cc	Benelli	IOM -	SUI -		ULS -	NAT; 3					7	10th	0
1950	500cc	Gilera	IOM -	BEL; 1	NED; 1	SUI; 2	ULS; 6	NAT; 2				28	1st	2
1951	500cc	Gilera	ESP; 1	SUI; 4	IOM -	BEL -	NED -	FRA -	ULS; 3	NAT; 2		21	3rd	1
1952	500cc	Gilera	SUI -	IOM -	NED; 1	BEL; 1	GER -	ULS -	NAT; 2	ESP; 2		28	1st	2
1953	250cc	NSU	IOM -	NED -	GER -	ULS -	SUI -	NAT; 6	ESP -			1	15th	0
1954	500cc	Gilera	FRA -	IOM -	ULS -	BEL -	NED -	GER -	SUI -	NAT; 2	ESP -	6	10th	0
1955	250cc	MV Agusta			IOM -	GER -		NED; 2	ULS; 3	NAT; 6		11	5th	0
1955	500cc	MV Agusta	ESP; 3	FRA; 4	IOM -	GER -	BEL -	NED; 3	ULS -	NAT; 1		19	3rd	1
1956	350cc	MV Agusta	IOM -	NED -	BEL; 5	GER -	ULS -	NAT; 8				2	14th	0
1956	500cc	MV Agusta	IOM -	NED -	BEL; 4	GER; 2	ULS -	NAT -				9	6th	0
1957	350cc	MV Agusta	GER; 4	IOM -	NED -	BEL -	ULS -	NAT -				3	10th	0
1957	500cc	MV Agusta	GER -	IOM -	NED -	BEL -	ULS -	NAT; 5				2	15th	0
1958	500cc	MV Agusta	IOM -	NED -	BEL -	GER -	SWE -	ULS -	NAT; 3			4	13th	0
