= Geoff Duke =

British motorcycle racer (1923–2015)

Geoff Duke OBE
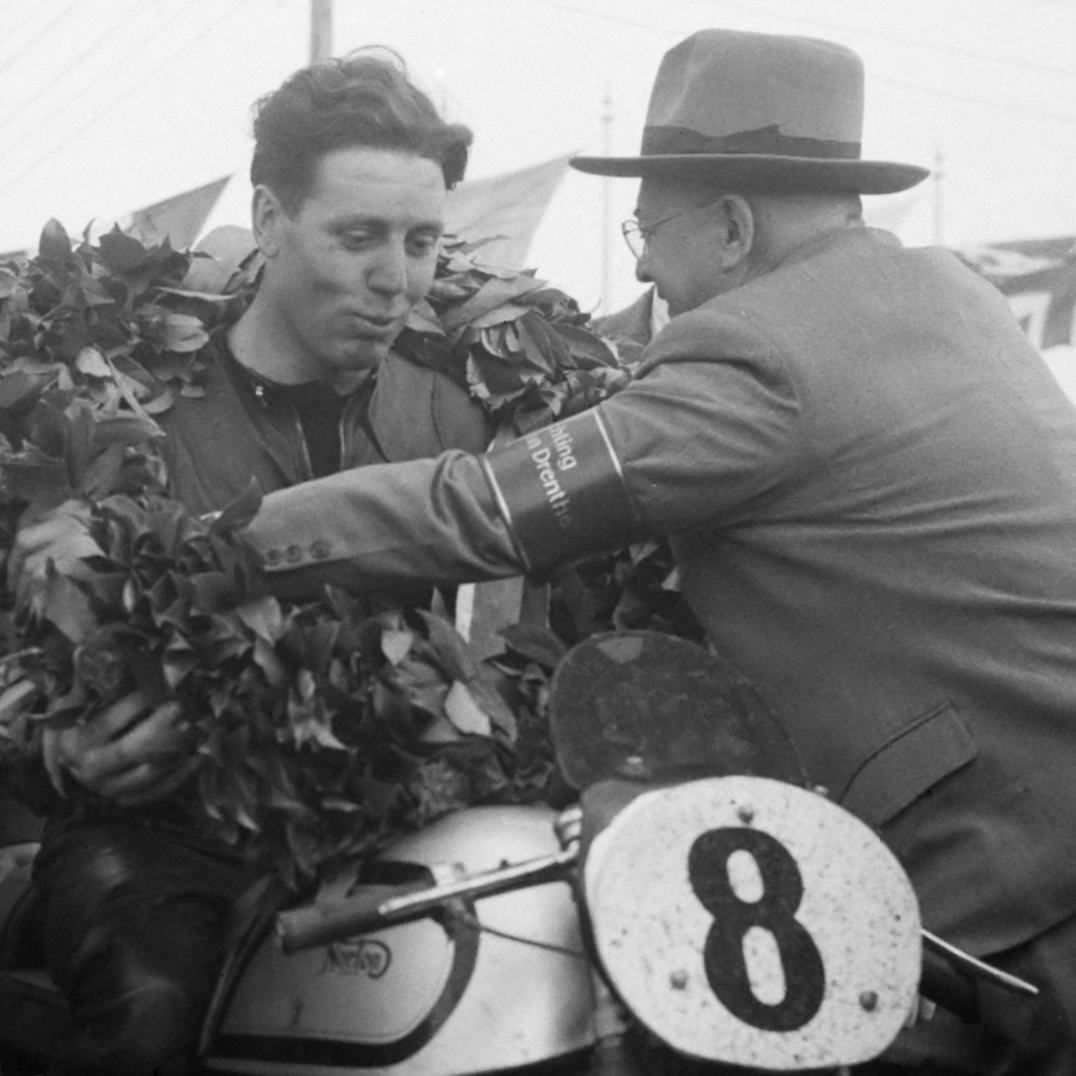
- Geoff Duke (1951)
- Nationality: (United Kingdom) British
- Born: 29 March 1923; St. Helens, Lancashire, England
- Died: 1 May 2015 (aged 92); Isle of Man
Motorcycle racing career statistics
Grand Prix motorcycle racing
Active years	1950–1959
First race	1950 Isle of Man TT
Last race	1959 Nations Grand Prix
First win	1950 500 cc Isle of Man TT
Last win	1958 500 cc Swedish Grand Prix
Team(s)	Benelli, BMW, Gilera, Norton, NSU
Championships	350 cc - 1951, 1952 500 cc - 1951, 1953 - 1955
Starts / Wins / Podiums / Poles / F. laps / Points; 89 / 33 / 50 / N/A / 29 / 359 (371)
Isle of Man TT career
TTs contested	9 (1949 – 1955, 1958, 1959)
TT wins	6
First TT win	1949 Clubmans Senior TT
Last TT win	1955 Senior TT
TT podiums	8

Geoffrey Ernest Duke OBE (29 March 1923 – 1 May 2015), born in St. Helens, Lancashire, was a British multiple motorcycle Grand Prix road racing world champion. He raced several brands of motorcycle: Norton, Gilera, BMW, NSU and Benelli. After retirement from competition, he was a businessman based in the Isle of Man.

== Sporting career ==
After reaching the status of Team Sergeant in the Royal Signals Motorcycle Display Team, The White Helmets, Duke was a prominent figure in racing in the 1950s, winning six world championships and six Isle of Man TT races. First entering the Isle of Man Manx Grand Prix in 1948, he retired after four laps of the Junior race. He came to prominence after the 1949 events, finishing second in the Junior race, after remounting due to a spill, and winning the Senior race with a record lap and race-average speeds. He also won the 1949 Senior Clubmans TT. He signed to the Norton works team for the 1950 TT, finishing second in the Junior TT and breaking both lap and race records in the Senior TT.

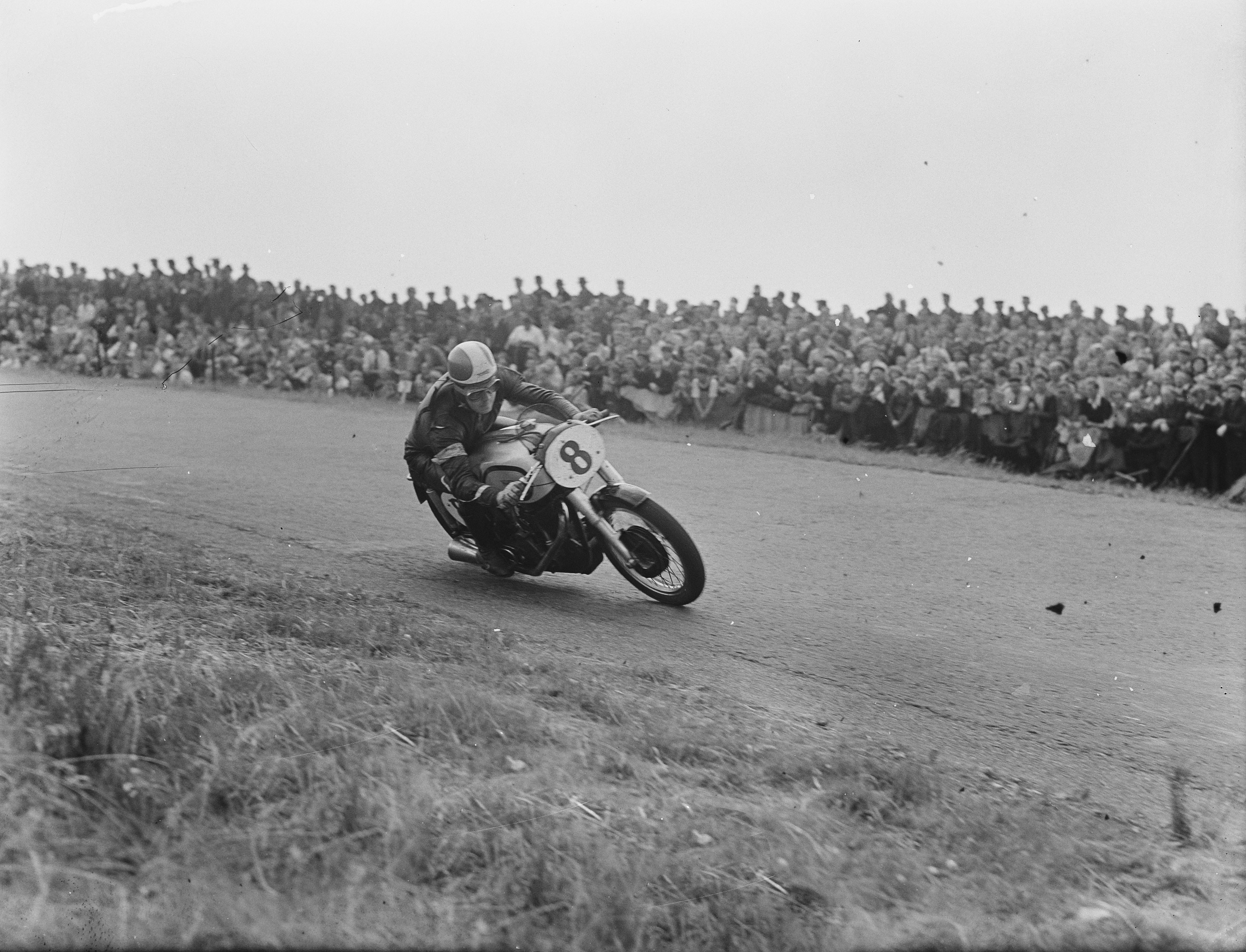
Duke en route to victory at the 1951 500cc Dutch TT

After winning three World Championships for Norton, Duke moved abroad to Italian motorcycle manufacturer, Gilera in 1953. With Gilera, he had a string of three consecutive 500 cc world championships. His support for a riders' strike demanding more start money led the FIM to suspend him for six months, dashing any hopes for a fourth consecutive title. For 1953 he joined the sports car racing team of Aston Martin (Feltham, Middlesex) to race the DB3. Teamed with Peter Collins, the pair led the 12 Hours of Sebring until Duke's accident and resulting DNF. In 1955 he was declared the first rider to lap the Isle of Man TT course at 100 mph, though this was later corrected to 99.97. As a consequence the official first 100 mph lap is credited to Bob McIntyre, also on a Gilera, in 1957. Duke was a non-starter because of injury. His final race was the 1959 Nations Grand Prix.

Duke briefly dabbled in Formula One, entering the 1961 German Grand Prix in a private Cooper-Climax. Although forced to withdraw from that event as his car was not yet ready, he did race in the non-championship Kanonloppet at Karlskoga two weeks later.

In 1963, Duke formed a racing team – Scuderia Duke, with riders Derek Minter and John Hartle – to race the 1957 Gileras against Mike Hailwood riding the MV Agusta.

During 1964, Duke was appointed Competition Manager for Royal Enfield motorcycles, helping to develop their new GP250 clubman's-category volume-production road racer.

For the 1965 International Six Days Trial held on the Isle of Man, Duke was instrumental in helping to devise the 1,000-mile course and sections held on an island measuring approximately 30 miles long by 10 miles wide, particularly using tracks which would be unavailable in mainland UK due to restrictive legislation, a problem which did not arise on self-governing Isle of Man. Additionally, the island had hotels easily able to cater for the visiting teams, followers and spectators with a traditional goodwill and enthusiasm towards motorcycle sport. Duke acted as Clerk of the Course to the ACU, the governing body of motorcycle sport in Great Britain including the Isle of Man, which interacted with the FIM international organisation.

In 1967, Duke acted as entrant for the class-winning Triumph Bonneville ridden by John Hartle in the 750 cc capacity section of the newly introduced for 1967 Production class, which required racing machines to be based on roadsters, complying with controlled specifications using selected adaptations only, available from the manufacturers as part-numbered inventory.

== Personal life ==
Duke was the most famous rider to adopt one-piece leathers - he had enlisted his local tailor, Frank Barker, to make the first of his now famous one-piece race suits. Duke had previously used a one-piece lining under his two-piece leather racing suit, to facilitate easy movement, for which he received "ribald remarks from my team-mates!" He was named Sportsman of the Year in 1951, and was awarded the RAC Segrave Trophy.

Duke is also known to popularize the "centered" riding style, whereby keeping himself on the saddle while cornering and keeping his upper body on the same lean angle as the bike. He also dismissed the notion of the "body leaning out" riding style would only be a fad. It had since been proven false after his passing, mostly because he was riding on less powerful machinery with thinner all-weather tyres.

Duke was appointed Officer of the Order of the British Empire (OBE) in the 1953 New Year Honours "for services to British Motor-Cycle racing."

Duke was one of many signatories in a letter to The Times on 17 July 1958 opposing 'the policy of apartheid' in international sport and defending 'the principle of racial equality which is embodied in the Declaration of the Olympic Games'.

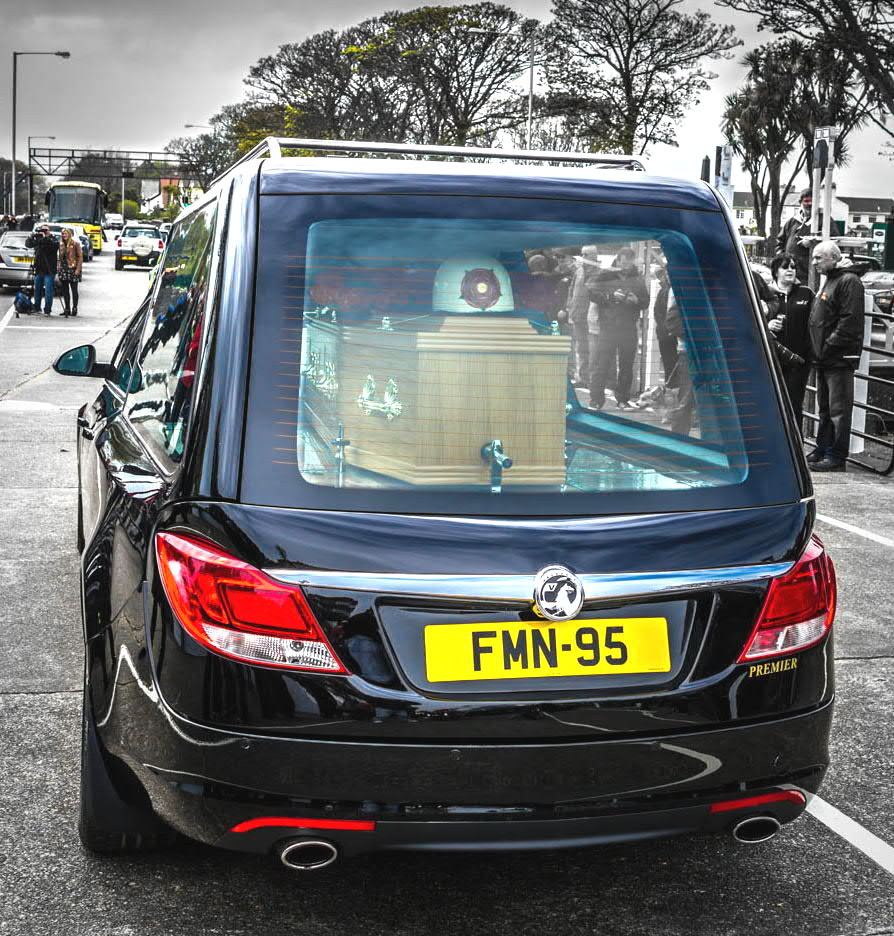
Duke's funeral cortege assembled at TT Grandstand

After retiring from racing, Duke became a businessman, initially in the motor trade and later in shipping services to the Isle of Man. In 1978, he was instrumental in setting up the Manx Line that introduced the first roll-on-roll-off ferry service to the island in competition with the 150-year-old Isle of Man Steam Packet Company The FIM named him a Grand Prix "Legend" in 2002.

Highly honoured by the Isle of Man, where he made so many of his world record breaking rides, a point on the mountain section of the TT Course was named after him in 2003. Three sharp bends at the 32nd Milestone between Brandywell and Windy Corner now carry the title 'Duke's'.

Duke died, aged 92, at his home on the Isle of Man on 1 May 2015 after being ill for some time. Duke's funeral cortege assembled at TT Grandstand, Glencrutchery Road, Douglas, Isle of Man on 10 May, prior to a last lap of the Snaefell Mountain Course, followed by a private family funeral service.

== World Championship results ==
**Position**	1	2	3	4	5	6
**Points**	8	6	4	3	2	1

(key) (Races in bold indicate pole position; races in italics indicate fastest lap. An empty black cell indicates that the class did not compete at that particular championship round.)

Year	Class	Motorcycle	1	2	3	4	5	6	7	8	9	Rank	Points
1950			IOM	BEL	NED	SUI	ULS	NAT					
1950	350 cc	Norton	2	3	2	3		1				**2nd**	**24 (28)**
1950	500 cc	Norton	1	Ret	Ret	4	1	1				**2nd**	**27**
1951			ESP	SUI	IOM	BEL	NED	FRA	ULS	NAT			
1951	350 cc	Norton		Ret	1	1	Ret	1	1	1		**1st**	**32 (40)**
1951	500 cc	Norton		Ret	1	1	1	5	1	4		**1st**	**35 (37)**
1952			SUI	IOM	NED	BEL	GER	ULS	NAT	ESP			
1952	350 cc	Norton	1	1	1	1						**1st**	**32**
1952	500 cc	Norton	Ret	Ret	2	2						7th	12
1953			IOM	NED	BEL	GER	FRA	ULS	SUI	NAT	ESP		
1953	500 cc	Gilera	Ret	1	Ret		1	2	1	1		**1st**	**38**
1954			FRA	IOM	ULS	BEL	NED	GER	SUI	NAT	ESP		
1954	500 cc	Gilera	Ret	2	C	1	1	1	1	1		**1st**	**40 (46)**
1955			ESP	FRA	IOM	GER	BEL	NED	ULS	NAT			
1955	500 cc	Gilera	Ret	1	1	1	Ret	1		3		**1st**	**36**
1956			IOM	NED	BEL	GER	ULS	NAT					
1956	500 cc	Gilera			Ret	Ret	Ret	1				7th	8
1957			GER	IOM	NED	BEL	ULS	NAT					
1957	350 cc	Gilera					Ret	Ret				-	0
1957	500 cc	Gilera					3	2				4th	10
1958			IOM	NED	BEL	GER	SWE	ULS	NAT				
1958	350 cc	Norton	Ret	Ret	5	Ret	1	4	3			**3rd**	**17**
1958	500 cc	BMW	Ret	Ret	4	Ret						**3rd**	**13**
1958	500 cc	Norton					1	5	7			**3rd**	**13**
1959			FRA	IOM	GER	NED	BEL	SWE	ULS	NAT			
1959	250 cc	NSU		Ret								10th	5
1959	250 cc	Benelli			6			3		10		10th	5
1959	350 cc	Norton		4	4				3	Ret		5th	10
1959	500 cc	Norton			9		3		3	3		4th	12

== See also ==
- Duke Road Racing Rankings
