= Rudi Felgenheier =

German motorcycle racer

- Nationality: German
Motorcycle racing career statistics
Grand Prix motorcycle racing
Active years	1952
First race	1952 250cc German Grand Prix
Last race	1952 250cc German Grand Prix
First win	1952 250cc German Grand Prix
Last win	1952 250cc German Grand Prix
Team	DKW
Starts / Wins / Podiums / Poles / F. laps / Points; 1 / 1 / 1 / N/A / N/A / 8

Rudi Felgenheier (born 20 November 1930; died 20 October 2005) is a former Grand Prix motorcycle road racer from Germany. His best year was in 1952 when he won the 250cc German Grand Prix and finished the season in fifth place in the 250cc world championship. Felgenheimer was seriously injured during practice for the 1953 Isle of Man TT.
