= 1952 Spanish motorcycle Grand Prix =

(Spain) 1952 Spanish Grand Prix
Race details
- Race 8 of 8 races in the 1952 Grand Prix motorcycle racing season
- Date: 5 October 1952
- Location: Montjuïc circuit
- Course: Permanent racing facility; 4.205 km (2.613 mi)

500cc
Pole position
Rider	(Italy) Umberto Masetti	Gilera
Time	2:36.100	
Fastest lap
Rider	(Italy) Umberto Masetti	Gilera
Time	2:33.570	
Podium
First	(United Kingdom) Leslie Graham	MV Agusta
Second	(Italy) Umberto Masetti	Gilera
Third	(Australia) Ken Kavanagh	Norton

125cc
Pole position
Rider	(Italy) Romolo Ferri	Moto Morini
Time	2:45.000	
Fastest lap
Rider	(Italy) Emilio Mendogni	Moto Morini
Time	2:39.980	
Podium
First	(Italy) Emilio Mendogni	Moto Morini
Second	(United Kingdom) Leslie Graham	MV Agusta
Third	(United Kingdom) Cecil Sandford	MV Agusta

Sidecar (B2A)
Pole position
Rider	(United Kingdom) Cyril Smith	Norton
Time	2:50.100	
Fastest lap
Rider	(Italy) Ernesto Merlo	Gilera
Time	2:49.700	
Podium
First	(United Kingdom) Eric Oliver	Norton
Second	(France) Jacques Drion	Norton
Third	(United Kingdom) Cyril Smith	Norton

The 1952 Spanish motorcycle Grand Prix was the eighth and final round of the 1952 Grand Prix motorcycle racing season. It took place on 5 October 1952 at the Montjuïc circuit.

== 500 cc classification ==
Pos	Rider	Manufacturer	Laps	Time	Points
1	(United Kingdom) Leslie Graham	MV Agusta	48	2:06:18.3	8
2	(Italy) Umberto Masetti	Gilera	48	+26.9	6
3	(Australia) Ken Kavanagh	Norton	48	+30.2	4
4	(Italy) Nello Pagani	Gilera			3
5	(Republic of Ireland) Reg Armstrong	Norton			2
6	(United Kingdom) Syd Lawton	Norton			1
7	(West Germany) Siegfried Wünsche	DKW			
8	(Spain) Fernando Aranda	Gilera			
9	(Southern Rhodesia) Ray Amm	Norton			
10	(Gibraltar) John Grace	Norton			
11	(West Germany) Ewald Kluge	DKW			
12	(West Germany) Rudi Knees	Norton			
13	(United Kingdom) Humphrey Ranson	Norton			
14	(Republic of Ireland) Harry Lindsay	Triumph			
15	(Austria) Siegfried Vogel	Norton			

== 125 cc classification ==
Pos	Rider	Manufacturer	Laps	Time/Retired	Points
1	(Italy) Emilio Mendogni	Moto Morini	24	1:05:12.3	8
2	(United Kingdom) Leslie Graham	MV Agusta	24	+17.5	6
3	(United Kingdom) Cecil Sandford	MV Agusta	24	+2:00.2	4
4	(Italy) Romolo Ferri	Moto Morini	24	+2:46.0	3
5	(West Germany) Hermann Paul Müller	Mondial	23	+1 lap	2
6	(Italy) Luigi Zinzani	Moto Morini	23	+1 lap	1
7	(Netherlands) Dick Renooy	Eysink			
8	(Spain) José Maria Llobet	Montesa			
9	(West Germany) Ewald Kluge	DKW			
10	(Netherlands) Toon van Zutphen	Eysink			
11	(Spain) Ramon Soley	MV Agusta			
12	(Netherlands) Mobi Vierdag	Eysink			
13	(Austria) Paul Feurstein	Puch			
24 starters, 13 finishers

== Sidecar classification ==
Pos	Rider	Passenger	Manufacturer	Laps	Time	Points
1	(United Kingdom) Eric Oliver	(Italy) Lorenzo Dobelli	Norton	24	1:09:49.1	8
2	(France) Jacques Drion	(West Germany) Inge Stoll	Norton	24	+2:23.2	6
3	(United Kingdom) Cyril Smith	(United Kingdom) Les Nutt	Norton			4
4	(West Germany) Otto Schmidt	(West Germany) Otto Kölle	Norton			3
5	(France) René Bétemps	(France) André Drivet	Norton			2
6	(West Germany) Rudolf Koch	(West Germany) Adolf Flach	BMW			1
7	(Austria) Siegfried Vogel	?	Norton			

Previous race: 1952 Nations Grand Prix	FIM Grand Prix World Championship; 1952 season	Next race: 1953 Isle of Man TT
Previous race: 1951 Spanish Grand Prix	Spanish Grand Prix	Next race: 1953 Spanish Grand Prix
