= Parilla (motorcycle manufacturer) =

- Industry: Motorcycle
- Founded: 1946 Milan, Italy
- Founder: Giovanni Parrilla
- Defunct: 1967
- Fate: Defunct
- Headquarters: Milan, Italy

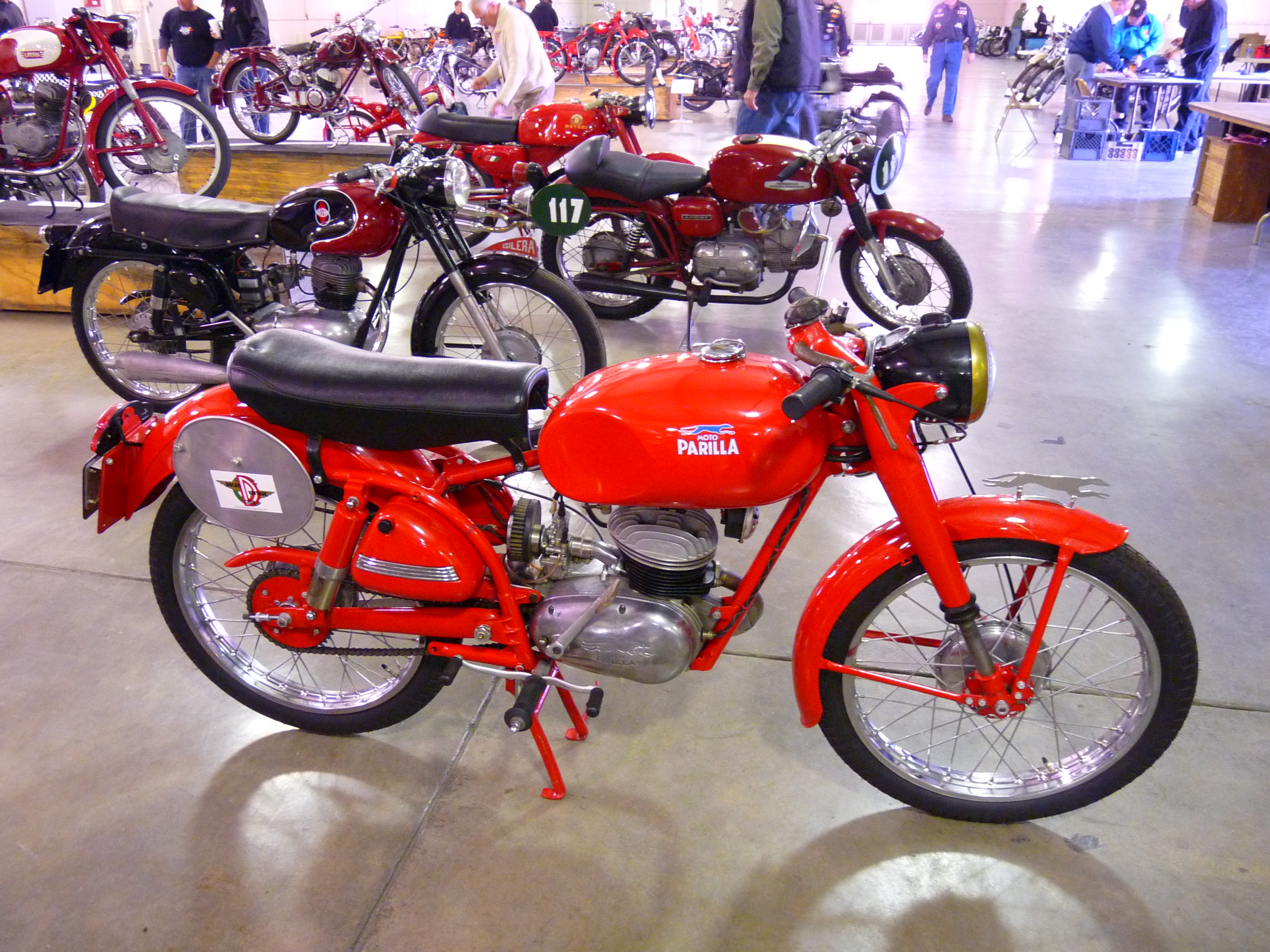
Parilla 125 2T

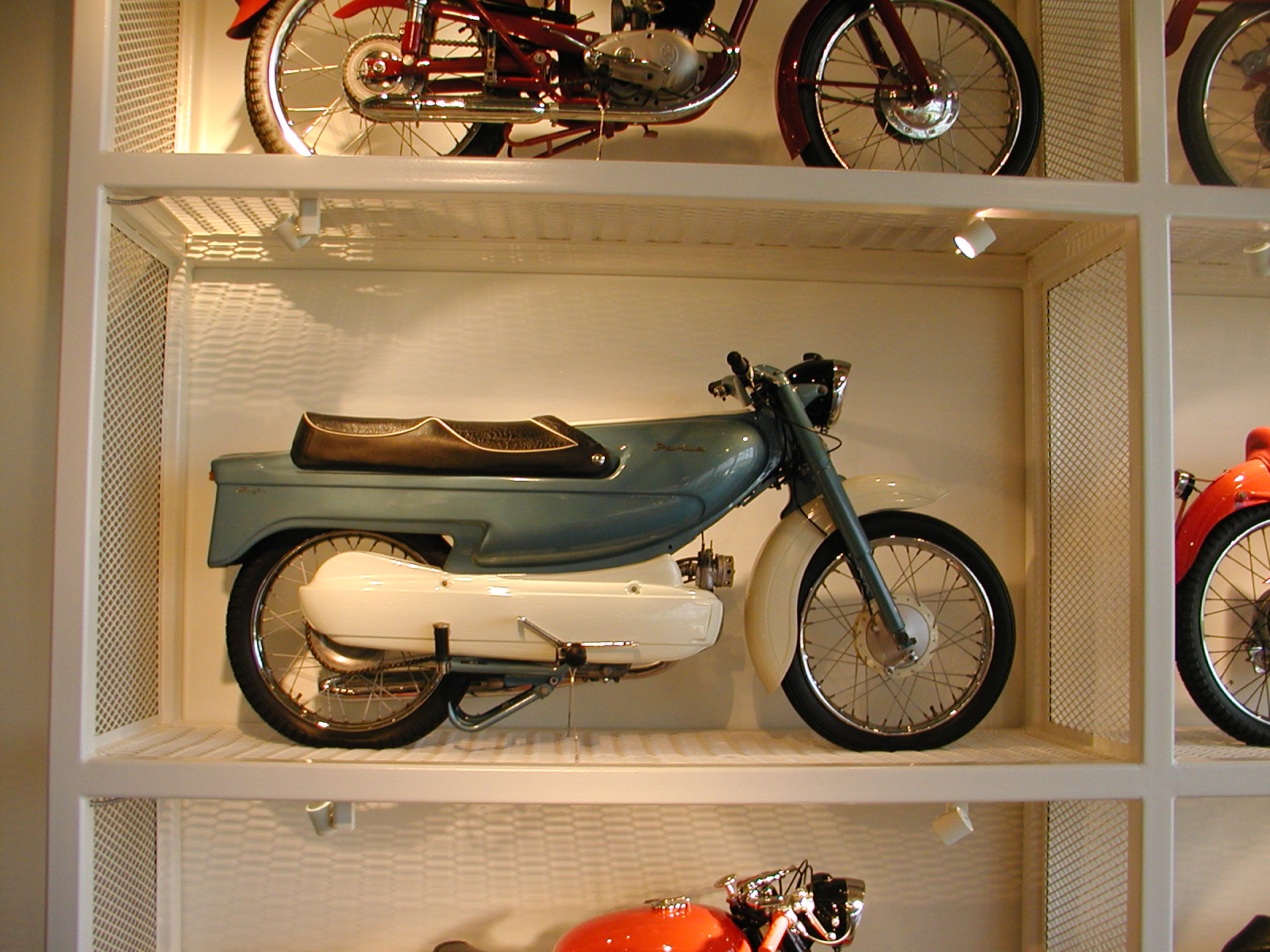
Parilla Slughi 99 (1959)

Parilla was an Italian motorcycle manufacturing company. It was founded in 1946 by Giovanni Parrilla, who dropped an 'R' in his name for the company title. He began by designing, building and racing a 248cc single cylinder, ohc motorcycle, which he modified to take a dohc. After this, he produced a variety of road bikes with; 98cc, 125cc and 250cc engines. In 1952 motorcycle designer Soncini was appointed and improved the range of motorcycles available. In the early 60s Parrilla experimented with a 125cc rotary-valve two-stroke attached to a 5-speed gearbox, but this project was abandoned and the company folded in 1967.

== List of models (incomplete) ==
- 125 Sport
- 175 Turismo Speciale
- 250 Boxer
- Fox
- Fox SS
- Slughi 150
- Veltro Twin
