= Italian motorcycle Grand Prix =

Motorcycle race held in Italy

Italian Grand Prix

Grand Prix motorcycle racing
- Venue: Mugello Circuit (1976, 1978, 1985, 1992, 1994–2019, 2021–present); Misano Circuit (1980, 1982, 1984, 1989–1991, 1993); Imola Circuit (1969, 1972, 1974–1975, 1977, 1979, 1988); Monza Circuit (1949–1968, 1970–1971, 1973, 1981, 1983, 1986–1987)
- First race: 1949
- Most wins (rider): Giacomo Agostini (13)
- Most wins (manufacturer): Honda (49)

The Italian motorcycle Grand Prix is a motorcycling event that is part of the FIM Grand Prix motorcycle racing season. From 1949 to 1990 the event was known by the Italian: Gran Premio Delle Nazioni (Nations Grand Prix). It was one of the original rounds of the Grand Prix motorcycle racing calendar. The race was held exclusively at Monza for the first 23 years of its existence. From 1972 to 1993, the event rotated among several circuits and has been held at the Mugello Circuit since 1994, except 2020 in which the race was cancelled due to the outbreak of COVID-19.

== Official names and sponsors ==
- 1952, 1956: G.P. Motociclistico delle Nazioni (no official sponsor)
- 1964, 1973–1985: Gran Premio delle Nazioni (no official sponsor)
- 1986–1987, 1991, 1993–1995: Gran Premio d'Italia (was still hosted under the "Nations Grand Prix" name in English until 1990)
- 1989–1990: G.P. d'Italia/G.P. delle Nazioni (was still hosted under the "Nations Grand Prix" name in English until 1990)
- 1996–1997: Gran Premio d'Italia Polini
- 1998: Gran Premio Q8 d'Italia
- 1999: Gran Premio d'Italia IP
- 2000–2004: Gran Premio Cinzano d'Italia
- 2005: Gran Premio Alice d'Italia
- 2006–2009: Gran Premio d'Italia Alice
- 2010–2016: Gran Premio d'Italia TIM
- 2017–2019, 2021–2023: Gran Premio d'Italia Oakley
- 2024: Gran Premio d'Italia Brembo
- 2025–present: Brembo Grand Prix of Italy

== Winners ==
=== Multiple winners (riders) ===
# Wins	Rider	Wins	
# Wins	Rider	Category	Years won
13	(Italy) Giacomo Agostini	500cc	1966, 1967, 1968, 1970, 1972, 1975
13	(Italy) Giacomo Agostini	350cc	1965, 1966, 1968, 1970, 1972, 1973, 1974
9	(Italy) Carlo Ubbiali	250cc	1955, 1956, 1959, 1960
9	(Italy) Carlo Ubbiali	125cc	1951, 1955, 1956, 1957, 1960
9	(Spain) Ángel Nieto	125cc	1970, 1972, 1974, 1979, 1982, 1983, 1984
9	(Spain) Ángel Nieto	50cc	1975, 1976
9	(Italy) Valentino Rossi	MotoGP	2002, 2003, 2004, 2005, 2006, 2007, 2008
9	(Italy) Valentino Rossi	250cc	1999
9	(Italy) Valentino Rossi	125cc	1997
7	(Spain) Jorge Lorenzo	MotoGP	2011, 2012, 2013, 2015, 2016, 2018
7	(Spain) Jorge Lorenzo	250cc	2006
6	(United Kingdom) Geoff Duke	500cc	1950, 1953, 1954, 1956
6	(United Kingdom) Geoff Duke	350cc	1950, 1951
6	(United Kingdom) Mike Hailwood	500cc	1961, 1962, 1963, 1964, 1965
6	(United Kingdom) Mike Hailwood	250cc	1966
6	(Spain) Jorge Martínez	125cc	1988, 1990
6	(Spain) Jorge Martínez	80cc	1985, 1987, 1988, 1989
6	(Australia) Mick Doohan	500cc	1991, 1994, 1995, 1996, 1997, 1998
5	(United Kingdom) John Surtees	500cc	1958, 1959, 1960
5	(United Kingdom) John Surtees	350cc	1958, 1959
5	(Federation of Rhodesia and Nyasaland) Jim Redman	350cc	1962, 1963, 1964
5	(Federation of Rhodesia and Nyasaland) Jim Redman	250cc	1961, 1962
5	(United Kingdom) Phil Read	350cc	1969
5	(United Kingdom) Phil Read	250cc	1964, 1967, 1968, 1969
5	(Italy) Pier Paolo Bianchi	125cc	1976, 1977, 1980, 1985
5	(Italy) Pier Paolo Bianchi	80cc	1984
4	(Italy) Enrico Lorenzetti	350cc	1953
4	(Italy) Enrico Lorenzetti	250cc	1951, 1952, 1953
4	(Netherlands) Jan de Vries	50cc	1970, 1971, 1972, 1973
4	(Italy) Eugenio Lazzarini	125cc	1978
4	(Italy) Eugenio Lazzarini	50cc	1977, 1979, 1980
4	(United States) Kenny Roberts	500cc	1978, 1979, 1980, 1981
4	(United States) Freddie Spencer	500cc	1983, 1984, 1985
4	(United States) Freddie Spencer	350cc	1985
4	(West Germany) Anton Mang	250cc	1980, 1982, 1986, 1987
4	(Spain) Marc Márquez	MotoGP	2014, 2025
4	(Spain) Marc Márquez	Moto2	2011
4	(Spain) Marc Márquez	125cc	2010
3	(Italy) Tarquinio Provini	250cc	1957, 1963, 1965
3	(Switzerland) Luigi Taveri	125cc	1963, 1964, 1966
3	(Italy) Walter Villa	250cc	1974, 1975, 1976
3	(South Africa) Kork Ballington	350cc	1978
3	(South Africa) Kork Ballington	250cc	1978, 1979
3	(Venezuela) Johnny Cecotto	350cc	1975, 1976, 1980
3	(Switzerland) Stefan Dörflinger	80cc	1986
3	(Switzerland) Stefan Dörflinger	50cc	1982, 1983
3	(Italy) Fausto Gresini	125cc	1986, 1987, 1991
3	(Italy) Luca Cadalora	500cc	1993
3	(Italy) Luca Cadalora	250cc	1991, 1992
3	(Italy) Max Biaggi	250cc	1995, 1996, 1997
3	(Italy) Roberto Locatelli	125cc	1999, 2000, 2004
3	(Italy) Mattia Pasini	Moto2	2017
3	(Italy) Mattia Pasini	250cc	2009
3	(Italy) Mattia Pasini	125cc	2006
3	(Italy) Francesco Bagnaia	MotoGP	2022, 2023, 2024
2	(Italy) Dario Ambrosini	250cc	1949, 1950
2	(Italy) Gianni Leoni	125cc	1949, 1950
2	(Italy) Libero Liberati	500cc	1957
2	(Italy) Libero Liberati	350cc	1956
2	(Italy) Emilio Mendogni	250cc	1958
2	(Italy) Emilio Mendogni	125cc	1952
2	(East Germany) Ernst Degner	125cc	1959, 1961
2	(Federation of Rhodesia and Nyasaland) Gary Hocking	350cc	1960, 1961
2	(West Germany) Hans-Georg Anscheidt	50cc	1962, 1966
2	(United Kingdom) Bill Ivy	125cc	1967, 1968
2	(Italy) Alberto Pagani	500cc	1969, 1971
2	(United Kingdom) Barry Sheene	500cc	1976, 1977
2	(Spain) Ricardo Tormo	50cc	1978, 1981
2	(Italy) Franco Uncini	500cc	1982
2	(Italy) Franco Uncini	250cc	1977
2	(United States) Eddie Lawson	500cc	1986, 1988
2	(Italy) Ezio Gianola	125cc	1989, 1992
2	(Japan) Noboru Ueda	125cc	1994, 2001
2	(San Marino) Manuel Poggiali	250cc	2003
2	(San Marino) Manuel Poggiali	125cc	2002
2	(Spain) Dani Pedrosa	MotoGP	2010
2	(Spain) Dani Pedrosa	250cc	2005
2	(Italy) Andrea Iannone	Moto2	2010, 2012
2	(Spain) Tito Rabat	Moto2	2014, 2015
2	(Portugal) Miguel Oliveira	Moto2	2018
2	(Portugal) Miguel Oliveira	Moto3	2015
2	(Spain) Pedro Acosta	Moto2	2022, 2023
2	(Spain) Manuel González	Moto2	2025, 2026

=== Multiple winners (manufacturers) ===
# Wins	Manufacturer	Wins	
# Wins	Manufacturer	Category	Years won
49	(Japan) Honda	MotoGP	2002, 2003, 2010, 2014
49	(Japan) Honda	500cc	1983, 1984, 1985, 1987, 1989, 1991, 1994, 1995, 1996, 1997, 1998, 1999, 2000, 2001
49	(Japan) Honda	350cc	1962, 1963, 1964, 1967, 1985, 1986, 1987, 1988
49	(Japan) Honda	250cc	1961, 1962, 1966, 1989, 1991, 1992, 1994, 1997, 2005
49	(Japan) Honda	Moto3	2018, 2019, 2021
49	(Japan) Honda	125cc	1962, 1963, 1964, 1966, 1989, 1991, 1992, 1993, 1994, 1995, 1998
40	(Japan) Yamaha	MotoGP	2004, 2005, 2006, 2007, 2008, 2011, 2012, 2013, 2015, 2016, 2021
40	(Japan) Yamaha	500cc	1975, 1978, 1979, 1980, 1981, 1986, 1988, 1990, 1993
40	(Japan) Yamaha	350cc	1969, 1971, 1974, 1975, 1976, 1977, 1980
40	(Japan) Yamaha	250cc	1964, 1967, 1968, 1969, 1970, 1971, 1983, 1984, 1990, 2000
40	(Japan) Yamaha	125cc	1967, 1968, 1973
35	(Italy) MV Agusta	500cc	1952, 1955, 1958, 1959, 1960, 1961, 1962, 1963, 1964, 1965, 1966, 1967, 1968, 1970, 1972, 1974
35	(Italy) MV Agusta	350cc	1958, 1959, 1960, 1961, 1965, 1966, 1968, 1970, 1972, 1973
35	(Italy) MV Agusta	250cc	1955, 1956, 1959, 1960
35	(Italy) MV Agusta	125cc	1954, 1955, 1956, 1957, 1960
24	(Italy) Aprilia	MotoGP	2026
24	(Italy) Aprilia	250cc	1993, 1995, 1996, 1998, 1999, 2001, 2002, 2003, 2004, 2006, 2007, 2009
24	(Italy) Aprilia	125cc	1996, 1997, 1999, 2000, 2003, 2004, 2006, 2007, 2008, 2009, 2011
13	(Italy) Ducati	MotoGP	2009, 2017, 2018, 2019, 2022, 2023, 2024, 2025
13	(Italy) Ducati	125cc	1958
13	(Italy) Ducati	MotoE	2023 Race 1, 2023 Race 2, 2024 Race 1, 2024 Race 2
12	(Germany) Kalex	Moto2	2013, 2014, 2015, 2016, 2017, 2019, 2021, 2022, 2023, 2024, 2025, 2026
10	(Italy) Gilera	500cc	1949, 1951, 1953, 1954, 1956, 1957
10	(Italy) Gilera	350cc	1956, 1957
10	(Italy) Gilera	250cc	2008
10	(Italy) Gilera	125cc	2002
10	(Austria) KTM	Moto2	2018
10	(Austria) KTM	Moto3	2005, 2013, 2014, 2015, 2016, 2017, 2023, 2025, 2026
9	(West Germany) Kreidler	50cc	1962, 1970, 1971, 1972, 1973, 1975, 1977, 1979, 1982
9	(Spain) Derbi	125cc	1970, 1972, 1974, 1988, 2010
9	(Spain) Derbi	80cc	1985, 1987, 1988, 1989
8	(Japan) Kawasaki	350cc	1978, 1979, 1981
8	(Japan) Kawasaki	250cc	1978, 1979, 1980, 1982
8	(Japan) Kawasaki	125cc	1969
7	(Italy) Moto Guzzi	350cc	1953, 1954, 1955
7	(Italy) Moto Guzzi	250cc	1951, 1952, 1953, 1954
7	(Italy) Morbidelli	125cc	1971, 1975, 1976, 1977, 1978, 1980, 1985
6	(Japan) Suzuki	500cc	1976, 1977, 1982, 1992
6	(Japan) Suzuki	125cc	1965
6	(Japan) Suzuki	50cc	1966
5	(Italy) Garelli	125cc	1982, 1983, 1984, 1986, 1987
4	(United Kingdom) Norton	500cc	1950
4	(United Kingdom) Norton	350cc	1950, 1951, 1952
4	(Italy) Mondial	125cc	1949, 1950, 1951
4	(Italy) Mondial	250cc	1957
4	(United States) Harley-Davidson	250cc	1974, 1975, 1976, 1977
3	(Italy) Morini	250cc	1958, 1963
3	(Italy) Morini	125cc	1952
3	(Italy) Benelli	250cc	1949, 1950, 1965
3	(Spain) Bultaco	50cc	1976, 1978, 1981
2	(West Germany) MZ	125cc	1959, 1961
2	(Italy) Linto	500cc	1969, 1971
2	(France) Chevallier	350cc	1982
2	(France) Chevallier	250cc	1981
2	(Switzerland) Krauser	80cc	1986
2	(Switzerland) Krauser	50cc	1983
2	(Italy) Speed Up	Moto2	2010, 2012

=== By year ===
A pink background indicates an event that was not part of the Grand Prix motorcycle racing championship.

Year	Track	Moto3		Moto2		MotoGP		Report
Year	Track	Rider	Manufacturer	Rider	Manufacturer	Rider	Manufacturer	Report
2026	Mugello	(Spain) Brian Uriarte	KTM	(Spain) Manuel González	Kalex	(Italy) Marco Bezzecchi	Aprilia	Report
2025	Mugello	(Spain) Máximo Quiles	KTM	(Spain) Manuel González	Kalex	(Spain) Marc Márquez	Ducati	Report

Year	Track	MotoE				Moto3		Moto2		MotoGP		Report
Year	Track	Race 1		Race 2		Moto3		Moto2		MotoGP		Report
Year	Track	Rider	Manufacturer	Rider	Manufacturer	Rider	Manufacturer	Rider	Manufacturer	Rider	Manufacturer	Report
2024	Mugello	(Italy) Mattia Casadei	Ducati	(Italy) Kevin Zannoni	Ducati	(Colombia) David Alonso	CFMoto	(United States) Joe Roberts	Kalex	(Italy) Francesco Bagnaia	Ducati	Report
2023	Mugello	(Italy) Andrea Mantovani	Ducati	(Brazil) Eric Granado	Ducati	(Spain) Daniel Holgado	KTM	(Spain) Pedro Acosta	Kalex	(Italy) Francesco Bagnaia	Ducati	Report
2022	Mugello	(Switzerland) Dominique Aegerter	Energica	(Italy) Matteo Ferrari	Energica	(Spain) Sergio García	GasGas	(Spain) Pedro Acosta	Kalex	(Italy) Francesco Bagnaia	Ducati	Report

Year	Track	Moto3		Moto2		MotoGP		Report
Year	Track	Rider	Manufacturer	Rider	Manufacturer	Rider	Manufacturer	Report
2021	Mugello	(Italy) Dennis Foggia	Honda	(Australia) Remy Gardner	Kalex	(France) Fabio Quartararo	Yamaha	Report
2020	Mugello	Cancelled due to COVID-19 concerns						
2019	Mugello	(Italy) Tony Arbolino	Honda	(Spain) Álex Márquez	Kalex	(Italy) Danilo Petrucci	Ducati	Report
2018	Mugello	(Spain) Jorge Martín	Honda	(Portugal) Miguel Oliveira	KTM	(Spain) Jorge Lorenzo	Ducati	Report
2017	Mugello	(Italy) Andrea Migno	KTM	(Italy) Mattia Pasini	Kalex	(Italy) Andrea Dovizioso	Ducati	Report
2016	Mugello	(South Africa) Brad Binder	KTM	(France) Johann Zarco	Kalex	(Spain) Jorge Lorenzo	Yamaha	Report
2015	Mugello	(Portugal) Miguel Oliveira	KTM	(Spain) Tito Rabat	Kalex	(Spain) Jorge Lorenzo	Yamaha	Report
2014	Mugello	(Italy) Romano Fenati	KTM	(Spain) Esteve Rabat	Kalex	(Spain) Marc Márquez	Honda	Report
2013	Mugello	(Spain) Luis Salom	KTM	(United Kingdom) Scott Redding	Kalex	(Spain) Jorge Lorenzo	Yamaha	Report
2012	Mugello	(Spain) Maverick Viñales	FTR Honda	(Italy) Andrea Iannone	Speed Up	(Spain) Jorge Lorenzo	Yamaha	Report
Year	Track	125cc		Moto2		MotoGP		Report
Year	Track	Rider	Manufacturer	Rider	Manufacturer	Rider	Manufacturer	Report
2011	Mugello	(Spain) Nicolás Terol	Aprilia	(Spain) Marc Márquez	Suter	(Spain) Jorge Lorenzo	Yamaha	Report
2010	Mugello	(Spain) Marc Márquez	Derbi	(Italy) Andrea Iannone	Speed Up	(Spain) Dani Pedrosa	Honda	Report
Year	Track	125cc		250cc		MotoGP		Report
Year	Track	Rider	Manufacturer	Rider	Manufacturer	Rider	Manufacturer	Report
2009	Mugello	(United Kingdom) Bradley Smith	Aprilia	(Italy) Mattia Pasini	Aprilia	(Australia) Casey Stoner	Ducati	Report
2008	Mugello	(Italy) Simone Corsi	Aprilia	(Italy) Marco Simoncelli	Gilera	(Italy) Valentino Rossi	Yamaha	Report
2007	Mugello	(Spain) Héctor Faubel	Aprilia	(Spain) Álvaro Bautista	Aprilia	(Italy) Valentino Rossi	Yamaha	Report
2006	Mugello	(Italy) Mattia Pasini	Aprilia	(Spain) Jorge Lorenzo	Aprilia	(Italy) Valentino Rossi	Yamaha	Report
2005	Mugello	(Hungary) Gábor Talmácsi	KTM	(Spain) Daniel Pedrosa	Honda	(Italy) Valentino Rossi	Yamaha	Report
2004	Mugello	(Italy) Roberto Locatelli	Aprilia	(Argentina) Sebastian Porto	Aprilia	(Italy) Valentino Rossi	Yamaha	Report
2003	Mugello	(Italy) Lucio Cecchinello	Aprilia	(San Marino) Manuel Poggiali	Aprilia	(Italy) Valentino Rossi	Honda	Report
2002	Mugello	(San Marino) Manuel Poggiali	Gilera	(Italy) Marco Melandri	Aprilia	(Italy) Valentino Rossi	Honda	Report
Year	Track	125cc		250cc		500cc		Report
Year	Track	Rider	Manufacturer	Rider	Manufacturer	Rider	Manufacturer	Report
2001	Mugello	(Japan) Noboru Ueda	TSR-Honda	(Japan) Tetsuya Harada	Aprilia	(Brazil) Alex Barros	Honda	Report
2000	Mugello	(Italy) Roberto Locatelli	Aprilia	(Japan) Shinya Nakano	Yamaha	(Italy) Loris Capirossi	Honda	Report
1999	Mugello	(Italy) Roberto Locatelli	Aprilia	(Italy) Valentino Rossi	Aprilia	(Spain) Àlex Crivillé	Honda	Report
1998	Mugello	(Japan) Tomomi Manako	Honda	(Italy) Marcellino Lucchi	Aprilia	(Australia) Mick Doohan	Honda	Report
1997	Mugello	(Italy) Valentino Rossi	Aprilia	(Italy) Max Biaggi	Honda	(Australia) Mick Doohan	Honda	Report
1996	Mugello	(Germany) Peter Öttl	Aprilia	(Italy) Max Biaggi	Aprilia	(Australia) Mick Doohan	Honda	Report
1995	Mugello	(Japan) Haruchika Aoki	Honda	(Italy) Max Biaggi	Aprilia	(Australia) Mick Doohan	Honda	Report
1994	Mugello	(Japan) Noboru Ueda	Honda	(Germany) Ralf Waldmann	Honda	(Australia) Mick Doohan	Honda	Report
1993	Misano	(Germany) Dirk Raudies	Honda	(France) Jean-Philippe Ruggia	Aprilia	(Italy) Luca Cadalora	Yamaha	Report
1992	Mugello	(Italy) Ezio Gianola	Honda	(Italy) Luca Cadalora	Honda	(United States) Kevin Schwantz	Suzuki	Report
1991	Misano	(Italy) Fausto Gresini	Honda	(Italy) Luca Cadalora	Honda	(Australia) Mick Doohan	Honda	Report

== Winners of the Nations motorcycle Grand Prix ==
Year	Track	125cc		250cc		500cc		Report
Year	Track	Rider	Manufacturer	Rider	Manufacturer	Rider	Manufacturer	Report
1990	Misano	(Spain) Jorge Martínez	JJ Cobas	(United States) John Kocinski	Yamaha	(United States) Wayne Rainey	Yamaha	Report

Year	Track	80cc		125cc		250cc		500cc		Report
Year	Track	Rider	Manufacturer	Rider	Manufacturer	Rider	Manufacturer	Rider	Manufacturer	Report
1989	Misano	(Spain) Jorge Martínez	Derbi	(Italy) Ezio Gianola	Honda	(Spain) Sito Pons	Honda	(Italy) Pier-Francesco Chili	Honda	Report
1988	Imola	(Spain) Jorge Martínez	Derbi	(Spain) Jorge Martínez	Derbi	(France) Dominique Sarron	Honda	(United States) Eddie Lawson	Yamaha	Report
1987	Monza	(Spain) Jorge Martínez	Derbi	(Italy) Fausto Gresini	Garelli	(West Germany) Anton Mang	Honda	(Australia) Wayne Gardner	Honda	Report
1986	Monza	(Switzerland) Stefan Dörflinger	Krauser	(Italy) Fausto Gresini	Garelli	(West Germany) Anton Mang	Honda	(United States) Eddie Lawson	Yamaha	Report
1985	Mugello	(Spain) Jorge Martínez	Derbi	(Italy) Pier Paolo Bianchi	Morbidelli MBA	(United States) Freddie Spencer	Honda	(United States) Freddie Spencer	Honda	Report
1984	Misano	(Italy) Pier Paolo Bianchi	Huvo-Casal	(Spain) Ángel Nieto	Garelli	(Italy) Fausto Ricci	Yamaha	(United States) Freddie Spencer	Honda	Report
Year	Track	50cc		125cc		250cc		500cc		Report
Year	Track	Rider	Manufacturer	Rider	Manufacturer	Rider	Manufacturer	Rider	Manufacturer	Report
1983	Monza	(Switzerland) Stefan Dörflinger	Krauser	(Spain) Ángel Nieto	Garelli	(Venezuela) Carlos Lavado	Yamaha	(United States) Freddie Spencer	Honda	Report

Year	Track	50cc		125cc		250cc		350cc		500cc		Report
Year	Track	Rider	Manufacturer	Rider	Manufacturer	Rider	Manufacturer	Rider	Manufacturer	Rider	Manufacturer	Report
1982	Misano	(Switzerland) Stefan Dörflinger	Kreidler	(Spain) Ángel Nieto	Garelli	(West Germany) Anton Mang	Kawasaki	(Belgium) Didier de Radiguès	Chevallier	(Italy) Franco Uncini	Suzuki	Report
1981	Monza	(Spain) Ricardo Tormo	Bultaco	(France) Guy Bertin	Sanvenero	(France) Eric Saul	Chevallier-Yamaha	(South Africa) Jon Ekerold	Kawasaki	(United States) Kenny Roberts	Yamaha	Report
1980	Misano	(Italy) Eugenio Lazzarini	Iprem	(Italy) Pier Paolo Bianchi	Morbidelli MBA	(West Germany) Anton Mang	Kawasaki	(Venezuela) Johnny Cecotto	Yamaha	(United States) Kenny Roberts	Yamaha	Report
1979	Imola	(Italy) Eugenio Lazzarini	Kreidler	(Spain) Ángel Nieto	Minarelli	(South Africa) Kork Ballington	Kawasaki	(Australia) Gregg Hansford	Kawasaki	(United States) Kenny Roberts	Yamaha	Report
1978	Mugello	(Spain) Ricardo Tormo	Bultaco	(Italy) Eugenio Lazzarini	Morbidelli MBA	(South Africa) Kork Ballington	Kawasaki	(South Africa) Kork Ballington	Kawasaki	(United States) Kenny Roberts	Yamaha	Report
1977	Imola	(Italy) Eugenio Lazzarini	Kreidler	(Italy) Pier Paolo Bianchi	Morbidelli	(Italy) Franco Uncini	Harley-Davidson	(South Africa) Alan North	Yamaha	(United Kingdom) Barry Sheene	Suzuki	Report
1976	Mugello	(Spain) Ángel Nieto	Bultaco	(Italy) Pier Paolo Bianchi	Morbidelli	(Italy) Walter Villa	Harley-Davidson	(Venezuela) Johnny Cecotto	Yamaha	(United Kingdom) Barry Sheene	Suzuki	Report
1975	Imola	(Spain) Ángel Nieto	Kreidler	(Italy) Paolo Pileri	Morbidelli	(Italy) Walter Villa	Harley-Davidson	(Venezuela) Johnny Cecotto	Yamaha	(Italy) Giacomo Agostini	Yamaha	Report
1974	Imola	(Netherlands) Henk van Kessel	Van Veen Kreidler	(Spain) Ángel Nieto	Derbi	(Italy) Walter Villa	Harley-Davidson	(Italy) Giacomo Agostini	Yamaha	(Italy) Franco Bonera	MV Agusta	Report
1973	Monza	(Netherlands) Jan de Vries	Kreidler	(Sweden) Kent Andersson	Yamaha	Race cancelled (Note: The 250cc race was stopped, following an accident on the first lap that resulted in the deaths of Jarno Saarinen and Renzo Pasolini. The race meeting was ultimately cancelled.)		(Italy) Giacomo Agostini	MV Agusta	Race cancelled		Report
1972	Imola	(Netherlands) Jan de Vries	Kreidler	(Spain) Ángel Nieto	Derbi	(Italy) Renzo Pasolini	Aermacchi	(Italy) Giacomo Agostini	MV Agusta	(Italy) Giacomo Agostini	MV Agusta	Report
1971	Monza	(Netherlands) Jan de Vries	Kreidler	(Italy) Gilberto Parlotti	Morbidelli	(Switzerland) Gyula Marsovszky	Yamaha	(Finland) Jarno Saarinen	Yamaha	(Italy) Alberto Pagani	Linto	Report
1970	Monza	(Netherlands) Jan de Vries	Kreidler	(Spain) Ángel Nieto	Derbi	(United Kingdom) Rodney Gould	Yamaha	(Italy) Giacomo Agostini	MV Agusta	(Italy) Giacomo Agostini	MV Agusta	Report
1969	Imola	(Netherlands) Paul Lodewijkx	Jamathi	(United Kingdom) Dave Simmonds	Kawasaki	(United Kingdom) Phil Read	Yamaha	(United Kingdom) Phil Read	Yamaha	(Italy) Alberto Pagani	Linto	Report
1968	Monza			(United Kingdom) Bill Ivy	Yamaha	(United Kingdom) Phil Read	Yamaha	(Italy) Giacomo Agostini	MV Agusta	(Italy) Giacomo Agostini	MV Agusta	Report
1967	Monza			(United Kingdom) Bill Ivy	Yamaha	(United Kingdom) Phil Read	Yamaha	(United Kingdom) Ralph Bryans	Honda	(Italy) Giacomo Agostini	MV Agusta	Report
1966	Monza	(West Germany) Hans-Georg Anscheidt	Suzuki	(Switzerland) Luigi Taveri	Honda	(United Kingdom) Mike Hailwood	Honda	(Italy) Giacomo Agostini	MV Agusta	(Italy) Giacomo Agostini	MV Agusta	Report
1965	Monza			(New Zealand) Hugh Anderson	Suzuki	(Italy) Tarquinio Provini	Benelli	(Italy) Giacomo Agostini	MV Agusta	(United Kingdom) Mike Hailwood	MV Agusta	Report
1964	Monza			(Switzerland) Luigi Taveri	Honda	(United Kingdom) Phil Read	Yamaha	(Rhodesia) Jim Redman	Honda	(United Kingdom) Mike Hailwood	MV Agusta	Report
1963	Monza			(Switzerland) Luigi Taveri	Honda	(Italy) Tarquinio Provini	Morini	(Federation of Rhodesia and Nyasaland) Jim Redman	Honda	(United Kingdom) Mike Hailwood	MV Agusta	Report
1962	Monza	(West Germany) Hans-Georg Anscheidt	Kreidler	(Japan) Teisuke Tanaka	Honda	(Federation of Rhodesia and Nyasaland) Jim Redman	Honda	(Federation of Rhodesia and Nyasaland) Jim Redman	Honda	(United Kingdom) Mike Hailwood	MV Agusta	Report

Year	Track	125cc		250cc		350cc		500cc		Report
Year	Track	Rider	Manufacturer	Rider	Manufacturer	Rider	Manufacturer	Rider	Manufacturer	Report
1961	Monza	(East Germany) Ernst Degner	MZ	(Federation of Rhodesia and Nyasaland) Jim Redman	Honda	(Federation of Rhodesia and Nyasaland) Gary Hocking	MV Agusta	(United Kingdom) Mike Hailwood	MV Agusta	Report
1960	Monza	(Italy) Carlo Ubbiali	MV Agusta	(Italy) Carlo Ubbiali	MV Agusta	(Federation of Rhodesia and Nyasaland) Gary Hocking	MV Agusta	(United Kingdom) John Surtees	MV Agusta	Report
1959	Monza	(East Germany) Ernst Degner	MZ	(Italy) Carlo Ubbiali	MV Agusta	(United Kingdom) John Surtees	MV Agusta	(United Kingdom) John Surtees	MV Agusta	Report
1958	Monza	(Italy) Bruno Spaggiari	Ducati	(Italy) Emilio Mendogni	Morini	(United Kingdom) John Surtees	MV Agusta	(United Kingdom) John Surtees	MV Agusta	Report
1957	Monza	(Italy) Carlo Ubbiali	MV Agusta	(Italy) Tarquinio Provini	Mondial	(United Kingdom) Bob McIntyre	Gilera	(Italy) Libero Liberati	Gilera	Report
1956	Monza	(Italy) Carlo Ubbiali	MV Agusta	(Italy) Carlo Ubbiali	MV Agusta	(Italy) Libero Liberati	Gilera	(United Kingdom) Geoff Duke	Gilera	Report
1955	Monza	(Italy) Carlo Ubbiali	MV Agusta	(Italy) Carlo Ubbiali	MV Agusta	(United Kingdom) Dickie Dale	Moto Guzzi	(Italy) Umberto Masetti	MV Agusta	Report
1954	Monza	(Italy) Guido Sala	MV Agusta	(United Kingdom) Arthur Wheeler	Moto Guzzi	(United Kingdom) Fergus Anderson	Moto Guzzi	(United Kingdom) Geoff Duke	Gilera	Report
1953	Monza	(West Germany) Werner Haas	NSU	(Italy) Enrico Lorenzetti	Moto Guzzi	(Italy) Enrico Lorenzetti	Moto Guzzi	(United Kingdom) Geoff Duke	Gilera	Report
1952	Monza	(Italy) Emilio Mendogni	Morini	(Italy) Enrico Lorenzetti	Moto Guzzi	(Federation of Rhodesia and Nyasaland) Ray Amm	Norton	(United Kingdom) Leslie Graham	MV Agusta	Report
1951	Monza	(Italy) Carlo Ubbiali	Mondial	(Italy) Enrico Lorenzetti	Moto Guzzi	(United Kingdom) Geoff Duke	Norton	(Italy) Alfredo Milani	Gilera	Report
1950	Monza	(Italy) Gianni Leoni	Mondial	(Italy) Dario Ambrosini	Benelli	(United Kingdom) Geoff Duke	Norton	(United Kingdom) Geoff Duke	Norton	Report
1949	Monza	(Italy) Gianni Leoni	Mondial	(Italy) Dario Ambrosini	Benelli			(Italy) Nello Pagani	Gilera	Report
