= Emilio Mendogni =

Italian motorcycle racer (1932–2008)

- Nationality: (Italy) Italian
- Born: San Lazzaro Parmense
Motorcycle racing career statistics
Grand Prix motorcycle racing
Active years	1951–1953, 1958–1960
First race	1951 125cc Dutch TT
Last race	1960 500cc Nations Grand Prix
First win	1952 125cc Nations Grand Prix
Last win	1958 250cc Nations Grand Prix
Team	Moto Morini
Starts / Wins / Podiums / Poles / F. laps / Points; 11 / 3 / 5 / 0 / 0 / 56

Emilio Mendogni (13 May 1932 – 10 February 2008) was an Italian Grand Prix motorcycle road racer. His best year was in 1952 when he won two Grand Prix races and finished third in the 125cc world championship behind Cecil Sandford and Carlo Ubbiali. Mendogni won three Grand Prix races during his career.
