= 1955 Ulster Grand Prix =

Motorcycle race in Northern Ireland

Race details
- Race 7 of 8 races in the 1955 Grand Prix motorcycle racing season
- Date: 11–13 August 1955
- Location: Dundrod Circuit
- Course: Public roads; 11.934 km (7.415 mi)

500cc
- Rider
Fastest lap
Rider	(United Kingdom) Bill Lomas	Moto Guzzi
Time	4:43	
Podium
First	(United Kingdom) Bill Lomas	Moto Guzzi
Second	(United Kingdom) John Hartle	Norton
Third	(United Kingdom) Dickie Dale	Moto Guzzi

350cc
- Rider
Fastest lap
Rider	(United Kingdom) Bill Lomas	Moto Guzzi
Time	4:54	
Podium
First	(United Kingdom) Bill Lomas	Moto Guzzi
Second	(United Kingdom) John Hartle	Norton
Third	(United Kingdom) John Surtees	Norton

250cc
- Rider
Fastest lap
Rider	(United Kingdom) John Surtees	NSU
Time	5:00	
Podium
First	(United Kingdom) John Surtees	NSU
Second	(United Kingdom) Sammy Miller	NSU
Third	(Italy) Umberto Masetti	MV Agusta

The 1955 Ulster Grand Prix was the seventh round of the 1955 Grand Prix motorcycle racing season. It took place on 11–13 August 1955 at the Dundrod Circuit.

== 500 cc classification ==
Pos	Rider	Manufacturer	Laps	Time	Points
1	(United Kingdom) Bill Lomas	Moto Guzzi	25	2:00:31	8
2	(United Kingdom) John Hartle	Norton	25	+0:06	6
3	(United Kingdom) Dickie Dale	Moto Guzzi	25	+3:13	4
4	(United Kingdom) Bob McIntyre	Norton			3
5	(New Zealand) Peter Murphy	Matchless			2
6	(United Kingdom) John Clark	Matchless			1
7	(United Kingdom) Eric Jones	Norton			
8	(United Kingdom) Percy Tait	Norton			
9	(New Zealand) Bill Collett	Matchless			
10	(New Zealand) Morrie Low	BSA			
11	(United Kingdom) Bob Matthews	Velocette			
12	(United Kingdom) Malcolm Templeton	Matchless			
13	(United Kingdom) Ken Tostevin	Matchless			
14	A. F. J. D. Martin	Norton			
15	F. H. Turner	Norton			
16	(United Kingdom) Ralph Rensen	Norton			
17	(United Kingdom) Ernie Oliver	Norton			
18	R. Knox	Norton			
19	R. H. King	Norton			
20	K. W. Swallow	Matchless			
21	J. Hayes	AJS			
22	W. R. Evans	Matchless			

== 350 cc classification ==
Pos	Rider	Manufacturer	Laps	Time	Points
1	(United Kingdom) Bill Lomas	Moto Guzzi	20	1:39:38	8
2	(United Kingdom) John Hartle	Norton	20	+0:14	6
3	(United Kingdom) John Surtees	Norton	20	+1:13	4
4	(United Kingdom) Cecil Sandford	Moto Guzzi			3
5	(United Kingdom) Bob McIntyre	Norton			2
6	(New Zealand) Peter Murphy	AJS			1
7	(United Kingdom) Jack Brett	AJS			
8	(United Kingdom) Derek Powell	Norton			
9	(United Kingdom) John Clark	AJS			
10	(United Kingdom) Frank Perris	AJS			
11	(New Zealand) Bill Aislabie	AJS			
12	(United Kingdom) Percy Tait	AJS			
13	(United Kingdom) Sammy Miller	Norton			
14	(United Kingdom) Arthur Wheeler	AJS			
15	(United Kingdom) Ralph Rensen	Norton			
16	(New Zealand) Barry Stormont	BSA			
17	(United Kingdom) Bob Matthews	Velocette			
18	(New Zealand) Bill Collett	AJS			
19	R. Ferguson	AJS			
20	(New Zealand) Fred Cook	AJS			
21	(United Kingdom) Robin Fitton	Velocette			
22	A. F. J. D. Martin	AJS			
23	(United Kingdom) Malcolm Templeton	AJS			
24	W. Ferguson	AJS			
25	(United Kingdom) Austin Carson	BSA			
26	J. W. Parkinson	Norton			
27	S. Murray	Norton			
28	H. Plews	AJS			
29	(United Kingdom) Tom Turner	Norton			
30	R. Wijesinghe	Norton			
31	K. W. Swallow	AJS			
32	G. J. Canning	BSA			
33	P. McGarrity	BSA			
34	R. Dean	Norton			
35	N. Crossett	AJS			
36	W. R. Evans	AJS			
37	L. Rice	AJS			
38	N. Ellwood	Velocette			
39	S. McAvoy	AJS			
40	H. O'Reilly	Norton			
41	(New Zealand) Morrie Low	BSA			

== 250 cc classification ==
Pos	Rider	Manufacturer	Laps	Time	Points
1	(United Kingdom) John Surtees	NSU	13	1:06:00.4	8
2	(United Kingdom) Sammy Miller	NSU	13	+24.0	6
3	(Italy) Umberto Masetti	MV Agusta	13	+1:16.6	4
4	(United Kingdom) Bill Lomas	MV Agusta			3
5	(United Kingdom) Cecil Sandford	Moto Guzzi			2
6	(West Germany) Hermann Paul Müller	NSU			1
7	(United Kingdom) Arthur Wheeler	Moto Guzzi			
8	(United Kingdom) Percy Tait	Velocette			
9	(United Kingdom) Jimmy Herron	Norton			
10	(United Kingdom) Harold Kirby	Velocette			
11	(Switzerland) Hans Haldemann	Moto Guzzi			
12	S. Hodgkins	Excelsior			
13	(United Kingdom) David Andrews	Excelsior			

Previous race: 1955 Dutch TT	FIM Grand Prix World Championship; 1955 season	Next race: 1955 Nations Grand Prix
Previous race: 1954 Ulster Grand Prix	Ulster Grand Prix	Next race: 1956 Ulster Grand Prix
