= 1952 Swiss motorcycle Grand Prix =

(Switzerland) 1952 Swiss Grand Prix
Race details
- Race 1 of 8 races in the 1952 Grand Prix motorcycle racing season
- Date: 17–18 May 1952
- Location: Circuit Bremgarten
- Course: Permanent racing facility; 7.280 km (4.524 mi)

500cc
- Rider
Fastest lap
Rider	(United Kingdom) Jack Brett	AJS
Time	2:48.3	
Podium
First	(United Kingdom) Jack Brett	AJS
Second	(United Kingdom) Bill Doran	AJS
Third	(Italy) Carlo Bandirola	MV Agusta

350cc
- Rider
Fastest lap
Rider	(United Kingdom) Geoff Duke	Norton
Time	2:54.5	
Podium
First	(United Kingdom) Geoff Duke	Norton
Second	(New Zealand) Rod Coleman	AJS
Third	(Republic of Ireland) Reg Armstrong	Norton

250cc
- Rider
Fastest lap
Rider	(Italy) Enrico Lorenzetti	Moto Guzzi
Time	3:06.8	
Podium
First	(United Kingdom) Fergus Anderson	Moto Guzzi
Second	(Italy) Enrico Lorenzetti	Moto Guzzi
Third	(United Kingdom) Leslie Graham	Benelli

Sidecar (B2A)
- Rider
Fastest lap
Rider	(Italy) Ercole Frigerio	Gilera
Time	3:22.1	
Podium
First	(Italy) Albino Milani	Gilera
Second	(United Kingdom) Cyril Smith	Norton
Third	(France) Jacques Drion	Norton

The 1952 Swiss motorcycle Grand Prix was the first race of the 1952 Motorcycle Grand Prix season. It took place on 17–18 May 1952 at the Bremgarten circuit.

== 500 cc classification ==
Pos	Rider	Manufacturer	Laps	Time	Points
1	(United Kingdom) Jack Brett	AJS	28	1:21:03.0	8
2	(United Kingdom) Bill Doran	AJS	28	+20.6	6
3	(Italy) Carlo Bandirola	MV Agusta	28	+1:28.4	4
4	(Italy) Nello Pagani	Gilera			3
5	(New Zealand) Rod Coleman	AJS			2
6	(Southern Rhodesia) Ray Amm	Norton			1
7	(Italy) Libero Liberati	Gilera			
8	(United Kingdom) Syd Lawton	Norton			
9	(Switzerland) Willy Lips	Norton			
10	(West Germany) Friedel Schön	Horex			
11	(Switzerland) Hans Wirz	Triumph			
12	(United Kingdom) Bill Beevers	Norton			
13	(Switzerland) Max Forster	Gilera			
14	(Italy) Carlo Belotti	Moto Guzzi			

== 350 cc classification ==
Pos	Rider	Manufacturer	Laps	Time	Points
1	(United Kingdom) Geoff Duke	Norton	21	1:02:13.6	8
2	(New Zealand) Rod Coleman	AJS	21	+53.0	6
3	(Republic of Ireland) Reg Armstrong	Norton	21	+2:02.1	4
4	(United Kingdom) Jack Brett	AJS			3
5	(United Kingdom) Syd Lawton	AJS			2
6	(Southern Rhodesia) Ray Amm	Norton			1
7	(Australia) Ken Kavanagh	Norton			
8	(Switzerland) W. Wanner	AJS			
9	(Switzerland) Paul Fuhrer	Velocette			
10	(Switzerland) Werner Gerber	AJS			
11	(Switzerland) Willy Lips	Norton			
12	(West Germany) Kurt Knopf	AJS			
13	(Switzerland) Max Forster	Velocette			
14	(United Kingdom) Bill Beevers	Norton			
15	M. Fontanesi	AJS			
16	(West Germany) Roland Schnell	Horex			
17	(West Germany) Werner Mazanec	AJS			
18	L. Harris	Velocette			
19	F. Ellenberger	AJS			
20	(Switzerland) Edmund Laederach	AJS			

== 250 cc classification ==
Pos	Rider	Manufacturer	Laps	Time	Points
1	(United Kingdom) Fergus Anderson	Moto Guzzi	18	57:23.0	8
2	(Italy) Enrico Lorenzetti	Moto Guzzi	18	+6.1	6
3	(United Kingdom) Leslie Graham	Benelli	21	+24.7	4
4	(Italy) Alano Montanari	Moto Guzzi			3
5	(Italy) Nino Grieco	Parilla			2
6	(West Germany) Gotthilf Gehring	Moto Guzzi			1
7	(Italy) Carlo Belotti	Moto Guzzi			
8	(West Germany) Hermann Gablenz	Horex			

== Sidecar classification ==
Pos	Rider	Passenger	Manufacturer	Laps	Time	Points
1	(Italy) Albino Milani	(Italy) Giuseppe Pizzocri	Gilera	16	54:54.3	8
2	(United Kingdom) Cyril Smith	(West Germany) Bob Clements	Norton	16	+5.4	6
3	(France) Jacques Drion	(United Kingdom) Bob Onslow	Norton	16	+2:47.1	4
4	(Switzerland) Ferdinand Aubert	(Switzerland) René Aubert	Norton			3
5	(Belgium) Marcel Masuy	(United Kingdom) Denis Jenkinson	Norton			2
6	(France) Jean Murit	(France) André Emo	Norton			1
7	(Austria) Julius Beer	(Austria) Gernot Zingerle	Norton			
8	(West Germany) Franz Möhr	(West Germany) Günter Müller	BMW			
9	(West Germany) Fritz Mühlemann	(West Germany) Marie Mühlemann	Triumph			
10	(Switzerland) Roland Benz	(Switzerland) Gusti Fischer	Triumph			
11	(West Germany) Hermann Böhm	(Germany) Karl Fuchs	Norton			
12	(Switzerland) André Reichlin	(Switzerland) Maria Reichlin	Norton			
13	(Switzerland) Heinrich Stamm	(Switzerland) Peter Haberstich	Norton			
14	(Germany) Franz Vaasen	(Germany) Walter Viesler	Norton			
15	(Switzerland) Josef Suter	(Switzerland) Trudy Suter	FN			

Previous race: 1951 Nations Grand Prix	FIM Grand Prix World Championship; 1952 season	Next race: 1952 Isle of Man TT
Previous race: 1951 Swiss Grand Prix	Swiss motorcycle Grand Prix	Next race: 1953 Swiss Grand Prix
