= 1952 Belgian motorcycle Grand Prix =

(Belgium) 1952 Belgian Grand Prix
Race details
- Race 4 of 8 races in the 1952 Grand Prix motorcycle racing season
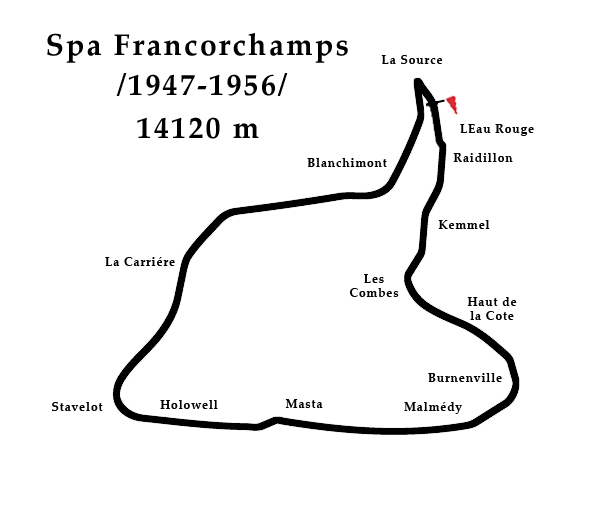
- Date: 6 July 1952
- Location: Circuit de Spa-Francorchamps
- Course: Permanent racing facility; 14.120 km (8.774 mi)

500cc
- Rider
Fastest lap
Rider	(Italy) Umberto Masetti	Gilera
Time	4:48.7	
Podium
First	(Italy) Umberto Masetti	Gilera
Second	(United Kingdom) Geoff Duke	Norton
Third	(Southern Rhodesia) Ray Amm	Norton

350cc
- Rider
Fastest lap
Rider	(United Kingdom) Geoff Duke	Norton
Time	5:06.1	
Podium
First	(United Kingdom) Geoff Duke	Norton
Second	(Southern Rhodesia) Ray Amm	Norton
Third	(Republic of Ireland) Reg Armstrong	Norton

Sidecar (B2A)
- Rider
Fastest lap
Rider	(United Kingdom) Eric Oliver	Norton
Time	5:44.0	
Podium
First	(United Kingdom) Eric Oliver	Norton
Second	(Italy) Albino Milani	Gilera
Third	(United Kingdom) Cyril Smith	Norton

The 1952 Belgian motorcycle Grand Prix was the fourth race of the 1952 Motorcycle Grand Prix season. It took place on the weekend of 6 July 1952 at the Circuit de Spa-Francorchamps.

== 500 cc classification ==
Pos	Rider	Manufacturer	Laps	Time	Points
1	(Italy) Umberto Masetti	Gilera	15	1h 13m 40s	8
2	(United Kingdom) Geoff Duke	Norton	15	+ 2s	6
3	(Southern Rhodesia) Ray Amm	Norton	15	+ 3s	4
4	(United Kingdom) Jack Brett	AJS			3
5	(New Zealand) Rod Coleman	AJS			2
6	(Italy) Nello Pagani	Gilera			1
7	(Belgium) Auguste Goffin	Norton			
8	(United Kingdom) Robin Sherry	Norton			
9	(Netherlands) Louis van Rijswijk	Norton			
10	(Belgium) Francis Basso	Norton			
11	(United Kingdom) Humphrey Ranson	Norton			
12	(Belgium) Edouard Texidor	Norton			

== 350 cc classification ==
Pos	Rider	Manufacturer	Laps	Time	Points
1	(United Kingdom) Geoff Duke	Norton	11	56m 57s	8
2	(Southern Rhodesia) Ray Amm	Norton	11	+ 7s	6
3	(Republic of Ireland) Reg Armstrong	Norton	11	+ 44s	4
4	(United Kingdom) Jack Brett	AJS			3
5	(United Kingdom) Bill Lomas	AJS			2
6	(United Kingdom) Leslie Graham	Velocette			1
7	(United Kingdom) Syd Lawton	AJS			
8	(Belgium) Auguste Goffin	Norton			
9	(United Kingdom) Tommy Wood	Norton			
10	(Australia) Ernie Ring	AJS			
11	(United Kingdom) Robin Sherry	Norton			
12	(United Kingdom) Bill Hall	Velocette			
13	(Australia) Tony McAlpine	Norton			
14	(New Zealand) Ken Mudford	AJS			
15	D. Stevenson	AJS			
16	(United Kingdom) Les Dear	AJS			
17	(Belgium) Jack Raffeld	AJS			
18	(Belgium) Francis Basso	AJS			
19	(United Kingdom) Robin Fitton	Norton			
20	A. van Fleteren	AJS			
21	(Netherlands) Lo Simons	Velocette			

== Sidecar classification ==
Pos	Rider	Passenger	Manufacturer	Laps	Time	Points
1	(United Kingdom) Eric Oliver	(United Kingdom) Stanley Price	Norton	8	46m 53s	8
2	(Italy) Albino Milani	(Italy) Giuseppe Pizzocri	Gilera	8	+ 1s	6
3	(United Kingdom) Cyril Smith	(West Germany) Bob Clements	Norton	8	+ 17s	4
4	(Italy) Ernesto Merlo	(Italy) Dino Magri	Gilera			3
5	(Belgium) Marcel Masuy	(United Kingdom) Denis Jenkinson	Norton			2
6	(France) Jacques Drion	(United Kingdom) Bob Onslow	Norton			1
7	(Belgium) Frans Vanderschrick	(Belgium) Jean-Marie Stas	Norton			
8	(Belgium) Julien Deronne	(Belgium) Bruno Leys	Norton			
9	(United Kingdom) Jackie Beeton	?	Norton			
10	(Netherlands) Hank Steman	?	Norton			
11	(United Kingdom) Len Taylor	(United Kingdom) Peter Glover	Norton			
12	(West Germany) Hermann Böhm	?	Norton			
13	(Belgium) Adhémar Maréchal	?	Norton			
14	(West Germany) Loni Neussner	?	BMW			
15	(Belgium) A. Winny	?	Norton			
16	(Belgium) R. Rosvort	?	Norton			
17	(Italy) Luigi Marcelli	?	Gilera			
18	(Belgium) Alphonse Vervroegen	(Belgium) Pierre Vervroegen	F.N.			

Previous race: 1952 Dutch TT	FIM Grand Prix World Championship; 1952 season	Next race: 1952 German Grand Prix
Previous race: 1951 Belgian Grand Prix	Belgian Grand Prix	Next race: 1953 Belgian Grand Prix
