= Eysink =

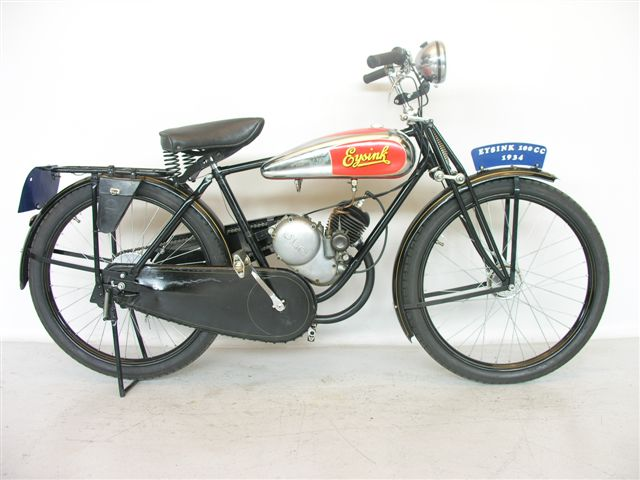
1934 Eysink motorcycle with ILO engine

The Eysink was a Dutch automobile manufactured from 1903 until 1919.

The Eysink brothers from Amersfoort, who created the marque, started out manufacturing bicycles. In 1897 they built their first automobile. However, the brothers did not begin production in earnest until 1903 (although they produced about 10 cars in this period) when they built a range of shaft-driven motor cars. During that time, motorcycle and bicycle manufacture had taken precedence. The shaft-driven cars were 10/12 hp, 16/20 hp, and 20/30 hp vehicles. A 30/40 hp six-cylinder was also produced. A light car called Bébé began production in 1912; this lasted until 1919. Peak production was around 50 automobiles per year. In all, Eysink produced about 400 motor cars. The company continued to build motorcycles until 1957.
