= NSU Motorenwerke =

German manufacturer (1873–1967/1977)

NSU Motorenwerke AG
- Trade name: NSU
- Industry: Automotive
- Predecessor: Deutsche Industriewerke
- Founded: 1873; 153 years ago
- Founder: Christian Schmidt
- Defunct: 1969; 1977
- Fate: Acquired by Volkswagen, merged with Auto Union to create Audi, production of high-end Audis
- Successor: Audi
- Headquarters: Neckarsulm, Germany
- Products: Knitting machines, automobiles, motorcycles, mopeds and scooters
- Number of employees: 1,000 (1904)

NSU Motorenwerke AG, or NSU, was a German manufacturer of automobiles, motorcycles and pedal cycles, founded in 1873. Acquired by Volkswagen Group in 1969, VW merged NSU with Auto Union, creating Audi NSU Auto Union AG, ultimately Audi. The NSU is an abbreviation of the name Neckarsulm.

== History ==
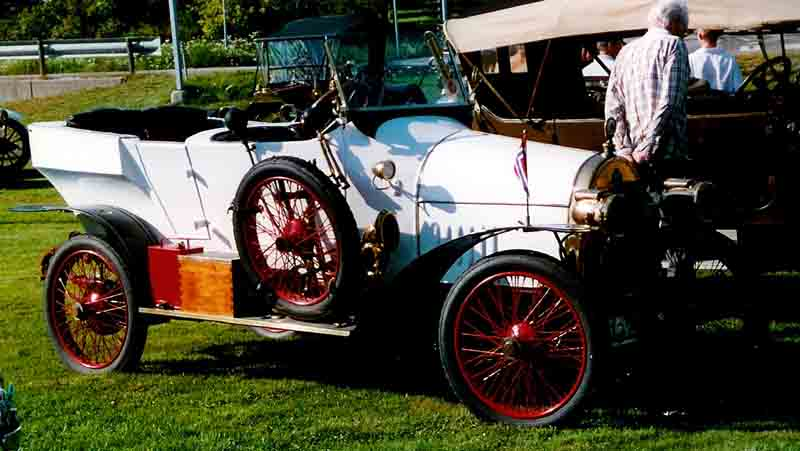
NSU 6/18 PS Doppelphaeton 1913

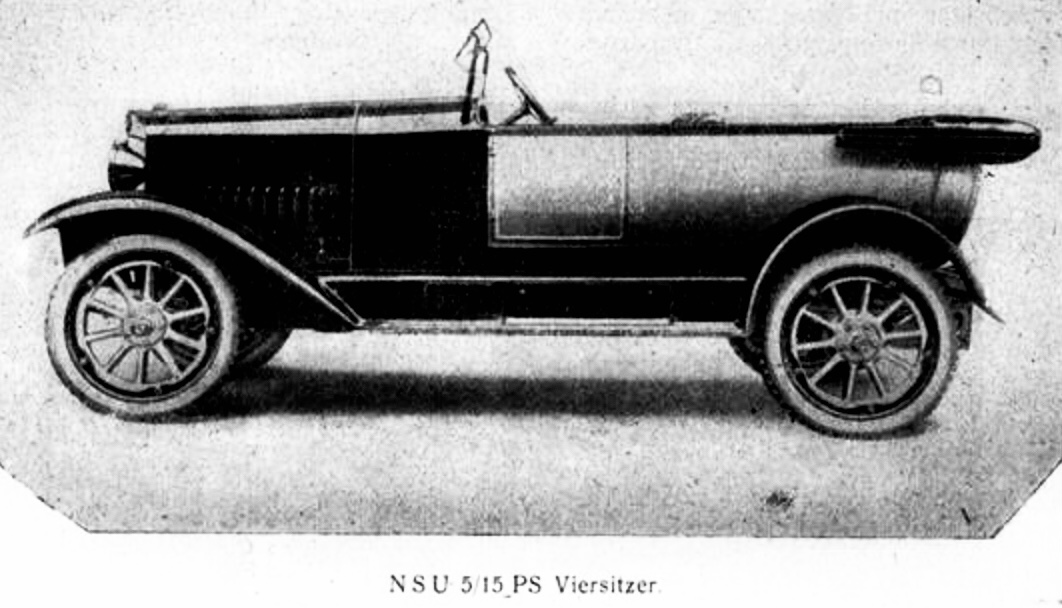
NSU 5/15 (1921-1925)

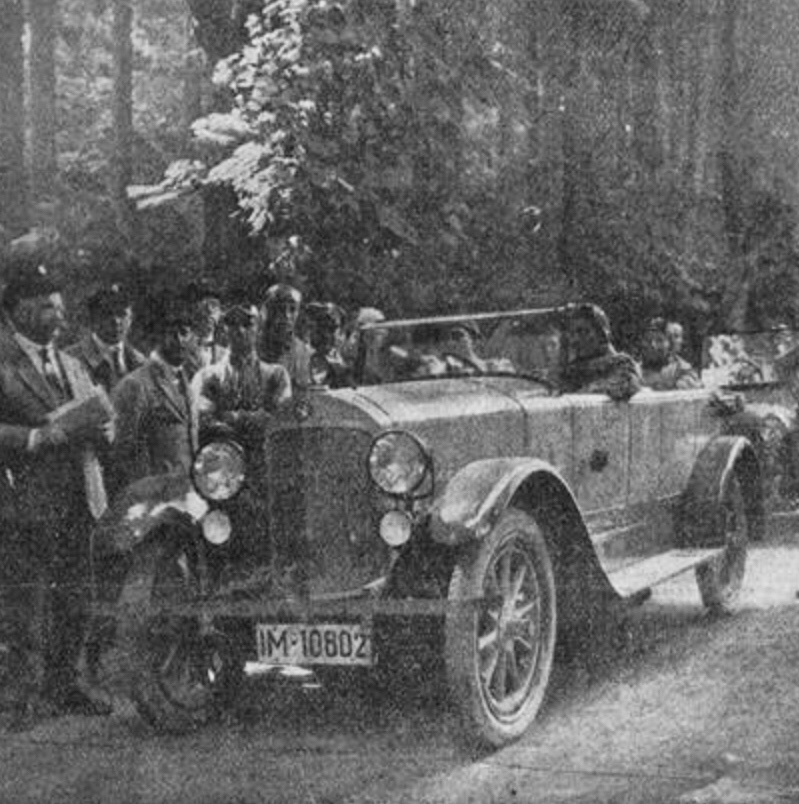
NSU 8/24 (1921-1925)

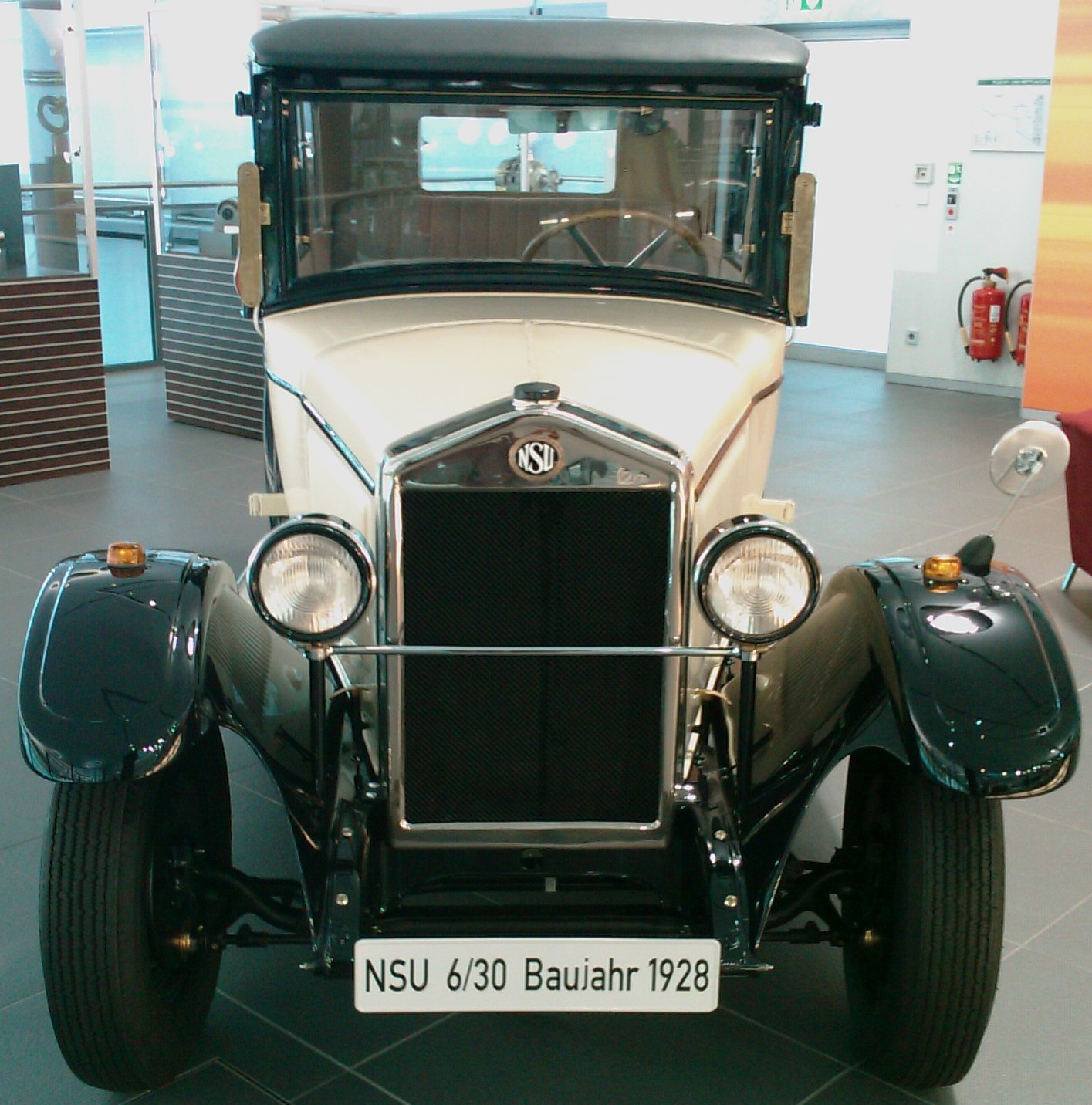
NSU 6/30 (1928)

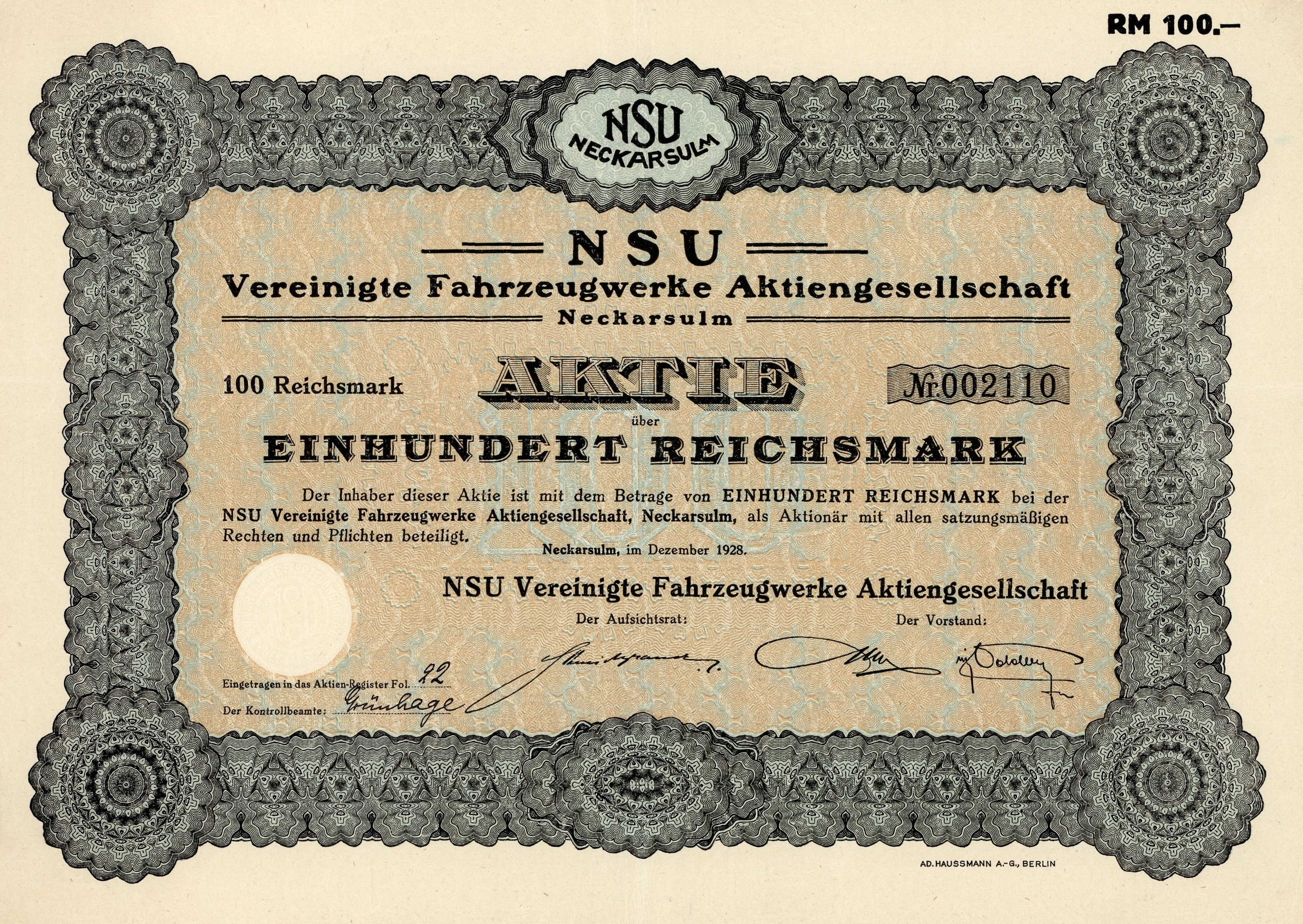
Share of the NSU Vereinigte Fahrzeugwerke AG, issued December 1928

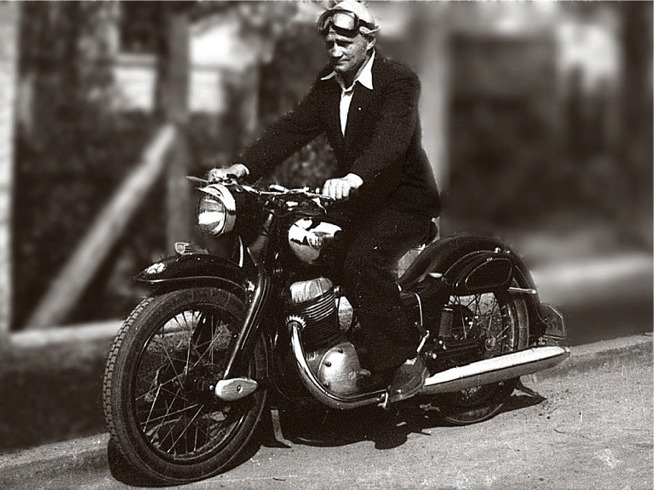
NSU Max Standard 1956

=== Origin ===
NSU originated as the "Mechanische Werkstätte zur Herstellung von Strickmaschinen", a knitting machine manufacturer established in 1873 by Christian Schmidt, a technically astute entrepreneur, in the town of Riedlingen on the Danube. The business relocated in 1880 to Neckarsulm. There followed a period of rapid growth and in 1886, the company began to produce bicycles, the first of them a 'high wheeler' or 'penny-farthing' branded as the "Germania". By 1892, bicycle manufacturing had completely replaced knitting machine production. At about this time, the name NSU appeared as a brand name.

The first NSU motorcycle appeared in 1901, followed by the first NSU car in 1905. In World War I the company made motorcycles and trucks for the German Army.

In 1932, under pressure from their bank (Dresdner Bank), NSU recognised the failure of their attempt to break into volume automobile production, and their recently built car factory in Heilbronn was sold to Fiat, who used the plant to assemble Fiat models for the German market. From 1957, NSU-Fiat cars assumed the brand name Neckar.

In World War II, NSU made the Kettenkrad, the NSU HK101, a half-tracked motorcycle with the engine of the Opel Olympia. They also made the 251 OSL motorcycle in the war.

=== After WW II ===
In December 1946, Das Auto reported the company had resumed the manufacture of bicycles and motor-bicycles at Neckarsulm. For Germany, this was a time of new beginnings, and in July 1946, a new board was appointed, headed by General Director Walter Egon Niegtsch, who earlier in his career had spent 17 years with Opel.

NSU motorcycle production resumed, in a completely destroyed plant, with prewar designs like the Quick, OSL, and Konsul motorcycle; furthermore, the HK101 continued to be sold by NSU as an all-terrain vehicle in a civilian version. The first postwar model was the NSU Fox in 1949, available in 2-stroke and 4-stroke versions. In 1953, the NSU Max followed, a 250 cc motorcycle with an overhead camshaft engine. The camshaft drive mechanism used reciprocating rods to connect the crankshaft and camshaft, a novel, elegant solution which ws pioneered and introduced by Bentley in 1926 on their 6 1/2 litre and Bentley Speed Six models and later carried over to their 1930 Bentley 8 Litre model]. These new NSU motorcycle models had an innovative monocoque frame of pressed steel and a central rear suspension unit. Albert Roder, the chief engineer behind the success story, made it possible that in 1955, NSU became the biggest motorcycle producer in the world. NSU also holds four world records for speed: 1951, 1953, 1954, and 1955. In August 1956, Wilhelm Herz at the Bonneville Salt Flats, Utah, became the first man to ride a motorcycle faster than 200 mph (322 km/h).

In 1957, NSU re-entered the car market with the new Prinz (Prince), a small car with a doubled NSU Max engine, an air-cooled two-cylinder engine of 600 cc (37 cu in) and 20 PS (15 kW). Motorcycle production continued until 1968. NSU's last production motorcycle was the Quick 50.

In 1964, NSU offered the world's first Wankel engined car: the Wankelspider. In development of the project, NSU built the Sport Prinz, with a 129 hp (96 kW) 995 cc (60.7 cu in) 2-rotor. In the same year Prinz 1000 and derivatives like the TT and TT/S followed. The Typ 110 (later called 1200SC) was launched in 1965 as a family car with a more spacious body design. The last NSU cars with a conventional four-stroke engine had the air-cooled OHC four-cylinder engine in common. The car was marketed in the U.K. as "NSU TYP 110", and Karobes, a major supplier of car accessories, provided a head rest specially for this car: "A new one which can be fitted without a screw, and may be adjusted forwards and backwards."

Also in 1964, NSU partnered with Citroën to develop the Wankel engine via the Comotor subsidiary, which resulted in the abortive 1973 Citroën GS Birotor production car.

In 1967, the four-door NSU Ro 80, with a 115 PS (85 kW) version of the same 2-rotor, was presented to the public. Weighing 1,200 kg (2,600 lb), it had a C_{d} of 0.36, disc brakes, independent suspension, and front wheel drive by Fichtel & Sachs Saxomatic three-speed transmission. It soon gained several design awards such as "car of the year 1967", while drivers liked its performance. Virtually all the world's major motor manufacturers purchased licenses from NSU to develop and produce the rotary-piston engine, with the notable exception of BMW.

Despite its public acclaim, sales of the Ro 80 were disappointing. The transmission drew complaints and the engine suffered numerous failures even at low mileage. Competitor automakers, apart from Mazda, held back from taking a lead in developing and marketing the Wankel technology, and anticipated income associated with those royalty deals failed to materialize.

=== Volkswagen Group takeover ===
The development of the rotary engine was very cost-intensive for the small company. Problems with the apex seals of the engine rotor significantly damaged the brand's reputation amongst consumers. In 1969, the company was taken over by Volkswagenwerk AG, but do not confuse it with the Volkswagen headquarters. Volkswagenwerk AG merged NSU with Auto Union, the owners of the Audi brand which Volkswagen had acquired five years earlier. The new company was called Audi NSU Auto Union AG and represented the effective end of the NSU marque with all future production to bear the Audi badge (although retaining the four interlocking circles of Auto Union). The management of the new combine was initially based at the Neckarsulm plant, however when the small rear-engined NSU models (Prinz 4, 1000, 1200) were phased out in 1973, the Ro 80 was the last car still in production carrying the NSU badge. Audi never made use of the brand name NSU again after April 1977, when the last Ro 80 was sold. In 1985, the company name was shortened to Audi AG and management moved back to Audi's headquarters in Ingolstadt.

Even as production of the Ro 80 continued in the Neckarsulm plant, production of larger Audi models like 100 and 200 was started. The Porsche 924 and later Porsche 944 were also assembled at Neckarsulm. Those models were joint venture projects of Porsche and VW, but Porsche did not have the internal capacity to build the 924 and 944. Currently, Neckarsulm is the production plant for Audi's topline vehicles such as A6, A8, and R8. It is also the home of the "Aluminium- und Leichtbauzentrum" where Audi's aluminium-made space frame bodies are designed and engineered.

NSU is primarily remembered today as the first licensee and one of only four automobile companies to produce cars for sale with rotary-piston Wankel engines. NSU invented the principle of the modern Wankel engine with an inner rotor. The NSU Ro 80 was the second mass-produced two-rotor Wankel-powered vehicle after the Mazda Cosmo. In 1967, NSU and Citroën set up a common company, Comotor, to build engines for Citroën and other car makers. Norton made motorcycles using Wankel engines. AvtoVaz (Lada) manufactured single and twin rotored Wankel powered cars in the early 1980s. Only Mazda has continued developing the Wankel engine and made several more cars with the Wankel engine. NSU developed their last car in a recognisably conventional layout, (front engine front wheel drive, water cooled) - this was the NSU K70, Volkswagen adopted this as their first water cooled front-engined car the VW K70. The first VW Golf cars used the NSU K70 engine which was almost identical. Subsequent VW models shared no lineage with NSU models, being descended from Auto-Union designs.

=== Lawn mower engine ===
In the early 1970s, NSU manufactured a vertical-crankshaft small engine for use as a lawn mower power unit.

=== NSU Museum ===
A museum in Neckarsulm, the Deutsches Zweirad- und NSU-Museum, has many of NSU's products on display.

=== Notable riders ===
Mike Hailwood raced in 1958 on Ducati, NSU, MV Agusta, Norton, Triumph, Paton and in 1958 was 4th in the world championship 250cc (NSU) 5. John Surtees entered in the 1955 season. That year, he gained his first podiums on a Norton in 350cc in Germany and Ulster. He also won the round in 250cc while riding the best lap in the race for his only appearance at the handlebars of a NSU. John Surtees remains the only champion of the world in both motorcycle racing and Formula 1.

pilots:

- Hermann Paul Müller (born in Bielefeld, 21 November 1909 – died in Ingolstadt, 30 December 1975) was a German sidecar, motorcycle, and race car driver.
- Hans Baltisberger (born 16 September 1924 – 26 August 1956 ) was a German professional Grand Prix motorcycle road racer.
- Florian Camathias (23 March 1924 – 10 October 1965) was a Swiss professional Grand Prix motorcycle and sidecar racer
- Louis Meznarie (14 January 1930) is a former French engine preparation expert and a team owner entrant to 24 Hours of Le Mans.
- Rupert Hollaus (4 September 1931 in Traisen – 11 September 1954) was an Austrian Grand Prix motorcycle road racer who competed for the NSU factory racing team.
- Rudi Thalhammer (born 1 February 1935) was a former Grand Prix motorcycle road racer from Austria.
- Georg Braun (born 2 September 1918 in Hechingen, Province of Hohenzollern) was a German Grand Prix motorcycle road racer.
- Helmut Hallmeier (1933 – 26 June 1976) was a former Grand Prix motorcycle road racer from the Germany.
- Geoff Duke (St Helens, Lancashire, 29 March 1923 – Man, 1 May 2015) was a motorcycle racer from England.
- Bill Lomas (1928–2007) was an English Grand Prix motorcycle road racer.
- Reg Armstrong (1 September 1928 – November 1979) was an Irish professional Grand Prix motorcycle road racer.
- Umberto Masetti (4 May 1926 – 28 May 2006) was an Italian two-time World Champion Grand Prix motorcycle road racer.
- Sammy Miller, MBE (born 11 November 1933 in Belfast, Northern Ireland) is a championship winning motorcycle racer, in both road racing and trials. He was awarded an MBE in the 2009 New Year Honours
- Tommy Robb, (born 14 October 1934) is a former Grand Prix motorcycle road racer from Northern Ireland.
- Bob Brown, (9 May 1930 in Sydney – 23 July 1960 at Solituderennen) was an Australian professional Grand Prix motorcycle road racer.
- Arthur Wheeler, (5 August 1916 – 16 June 2001) was an English professional Grand Prix motorcycle road racer.
- Horst Kassner was a former Grand Prix motorcycle road racer from Germany.

== NSU cars ==
=== NSU- (and NSU-Pipe) Cars (1905–1918) ===
The first NSU cars were the single cylinder 3-wheeled Sulmobil, first produced in 1905. At the same time NSU produced the NSU-Pipe 34 PS and NSU-Pipe 50 PS under licence from the Belgian firm of Pipe. Two further Pipe models were to follow, and a range of NSU-specific 3- and 4-wheeled models.

NSU-Cars (licensed from Pipe; 1905–1910) Source:

Type	Motor (all FourStroke)	Engine size in cm^{3}	max. Power in PS	At engine speed (rpm)	Years	Picture
NSU-Pipe 34 PS	4-Cylinder	3768	34	–	1905–1906	–
NSU-Pipe 50 PS	4-Cylinder	8290	50	–	1905–1906	–
NSU-Pipe 15/24 PS	4-Cylinder	3768	24	1650	1906–1910	–
NSU-Pipe 25/40 PS	6-Cylinder	6494	40	1100	1908–1909	–

NSU-Cars (1905–1918) Source:

Type	Motor (all FourStroke)	Engine size in cm^{3}	max. Power in PS	At engine speed (rpm)	Years	Picture
NSU Sulmobil Typ II/IV	1-Cylinder	451	3,5	–	1905–1909	–
NSU Sulmobil Typ III	2-Cylinder	795	5,5	–	1909	–
NSU 6/8 PS	1-Cylinder	451	8	–	1906	–
NSU 6/10 PS	4-Cylinder	1420	12	1650	1906–1907	–
NSU 6/12 PS	4-Cylinder	1540	13	1500	1907–1909	–
NSU 6/14 PS	4-Cylinder	1560	14	1650	1910–1911	–
NSU 6/18 PS	4-Cylinder	1560	18	1800	1911–1914	–
NSU 10/20 PS	4-Cylinder	2608	20	1400	1907–1910	–
NSU 10/22 PS	4-Cylinder	2608	22	1400	1910–1911	–
NSU 10/30 PS	4-Cylinder	2608	30	1600	1911–1916	–
NSU 5/10 PS	2-Cylinder	1105	10	1400	1910	–
NSU 5/11 PS	2-Cylinder	1105	11	1400	1911–1913	–
NSU 5/10 PS	4-Cylinder	1132	10	1600	1910–1911	–
NSU 5/11 PS	4-Cylinder	1132	11	1600	1911–1913	–
NSU 8/15 PS	4-Cylinder	1750	16	1500	1907–1910	–
NSU 9/18 PS	4-Cylinder	2208	18	1400	1910–1911	–
NSU 9/22 PS	4-Cylinder	2208	22	1400	1911–1912	–
NSU 9/27 PS	4-Cylinder	2208	27	1400	1911–1912	–
NSU 8/24 PS	4-Cylinder	2110	24	1800	1911–1918	–
NSU 13/40 PS	4-Cylinder	3397–3768	40	1800	1911–1912	–
NSU 13/35 PS	4-Cylinder	3397	35–40	1700	1912–1914	–
NSU 5/12 PS	4-Cylinder	1132	12	1600	1913–1914	–
NSU 5/15 PS	4-Cylinder	1232	15	1800	1914–1918	-
NSU 1¼-Tonner	4-Cylinder	3397	35	1800	1914–1918	–
NSU 2½-Tonner	4-Cylinder	3380	42	1700	1914–1926	–

=== NSU Cars (1919–1931) ===
Type	Motor (all FourStroke)	Engine size in cm^{3}	max. Power in PS	At engine speed (rpm)	Years	Picture
NSU 8/24 PS	4-Cylinder	2110	30	2100	1921–1925	–
NSU 14/40 PS	4-Cylinder	3606	54	2000	1921–1925	–
NSU 5/15 PS	4-Cylinder	1231	21	2100	1921–1925	–
NSU 8/32 PS Lieferwagen (Delivery truck)	4-Cylinder	2088	32	2200	1925–1927	–
NSU 5/25 PS	4-Cylinder	1307	25	2900	1925–1928	–
NSU 8/40 PS	4-Cylinder	2088	40	2800	1925–1927	–
NSU 5/15 PS (Kompressor-Rennwagen) (Supercharger race car)	4-Cylinder	1232	40–50	4000	1923–1925	–
NSU 6/60 PS (Kompressor-Rennwagen) (Supercharger race car)	6-Cylinder	1482	60	3800	1925–1926	–
NSU 6/30 PS	6-Cylinder	1567	30	3000	1928	–
NSU 7/34 PS	6-Cylinder	1781	34	3200	1928–1931	–

=== NSU Car post-war models ===
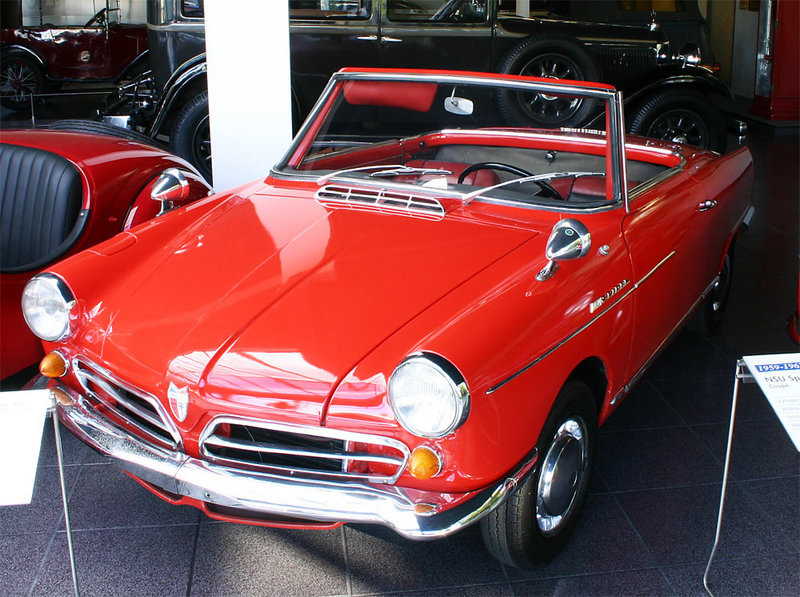
NSU Wankel Spider (1963–1967)

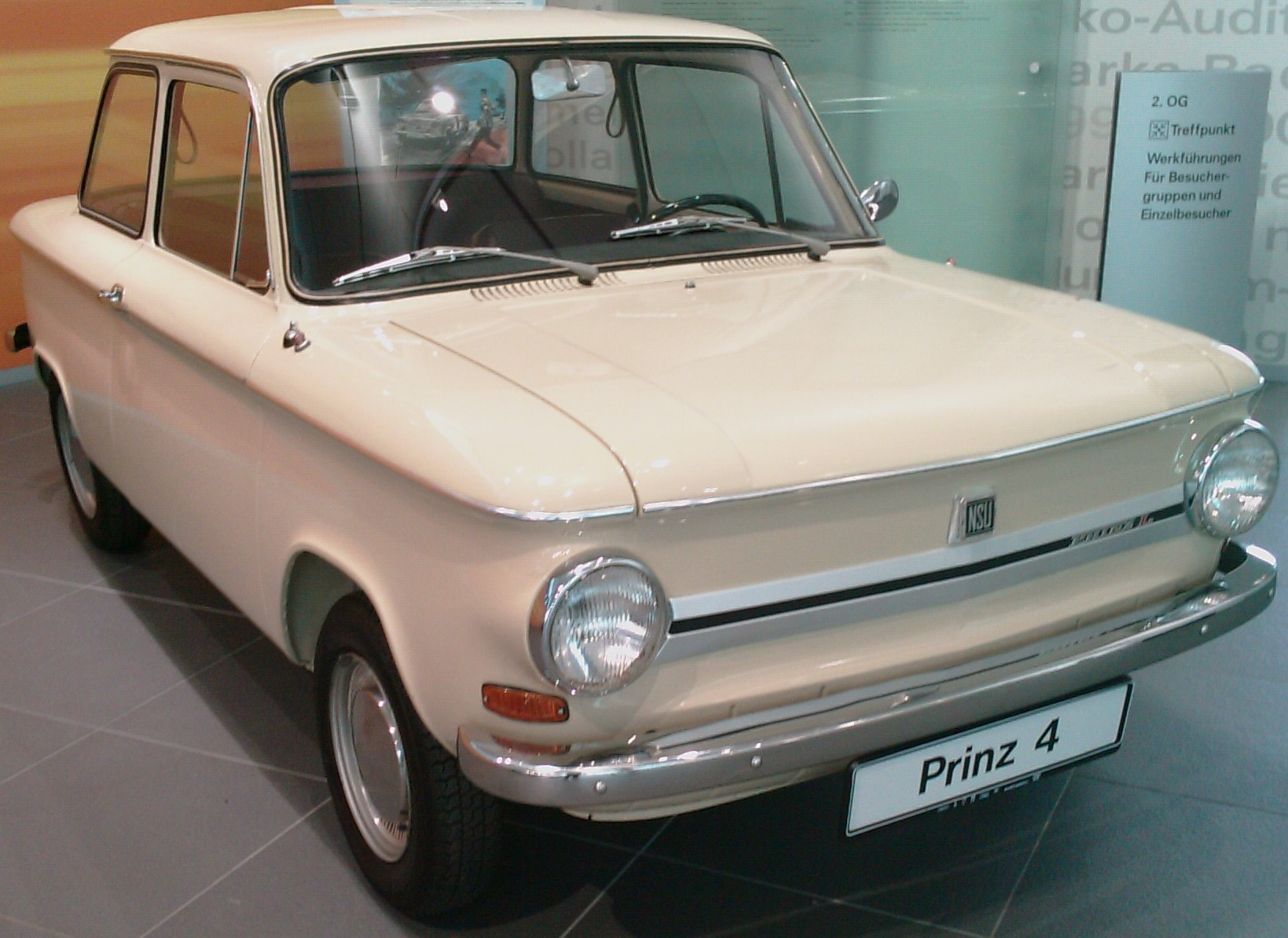
NSU Prinz 4

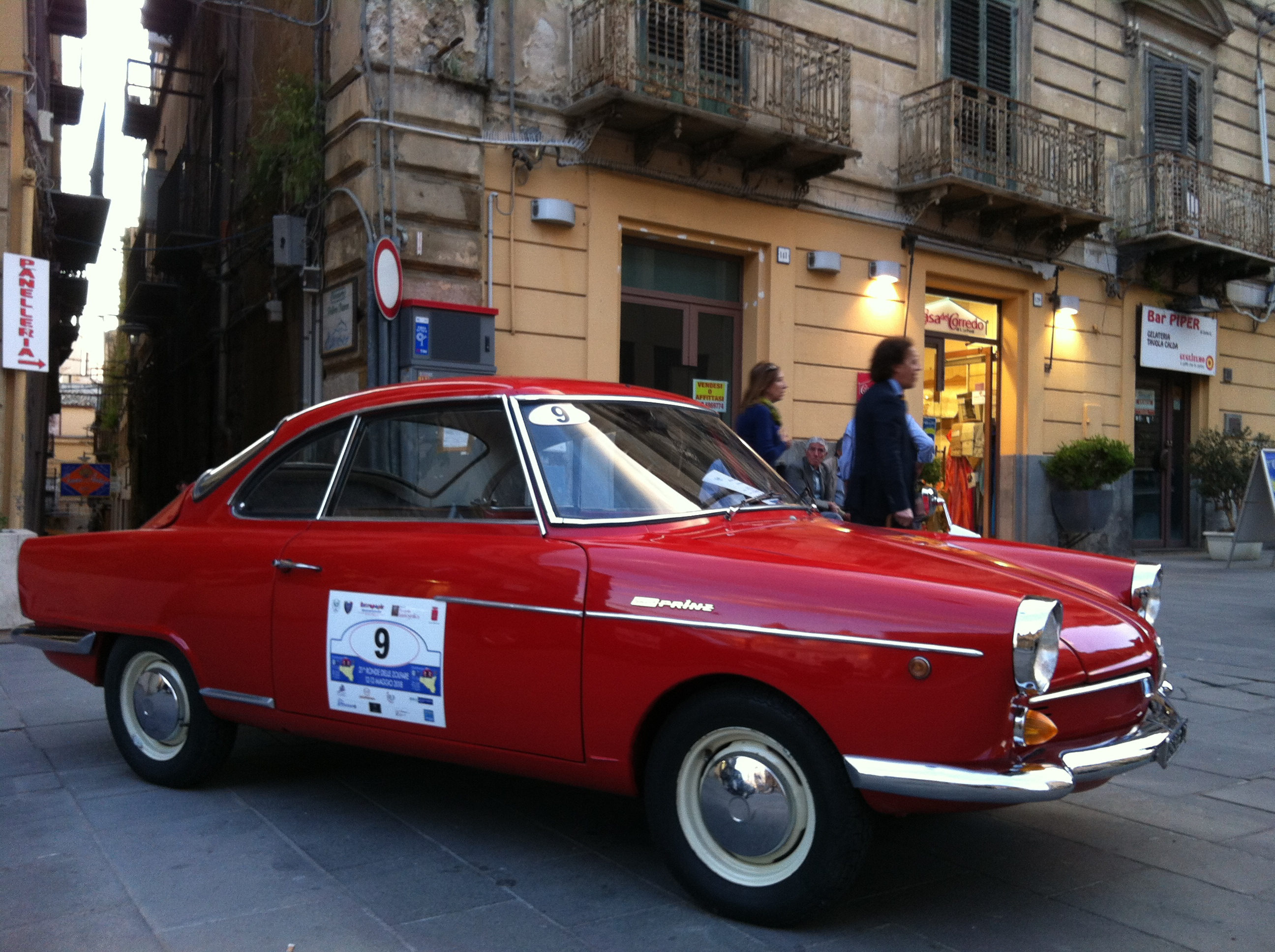
NSU Sport Prinz

NSU produced the following postwar cars:

- Prinz I, II & III I, II, 30 and III (1957–1962)
- Sport Prinz (1959–1967)
- Prinz 4, 4 L (240 cu in) (1961–1972)
- Prinz 1000, NSU 1000 (1964–1972)
- NSU 1000 TT, NSU TT, NSU TTS (1965–1972)
- NSU Typ 110 (1965–1967)
- NSU 1200 (1967–1972)
- NSU Spider (1964–1967)
- NSU Ro 80 (1967–1977)
- NSU K70, produced after VW/Audi takeover as the Volkswagen K70 (1970–1975)

=== Licence-built models made abroad ===
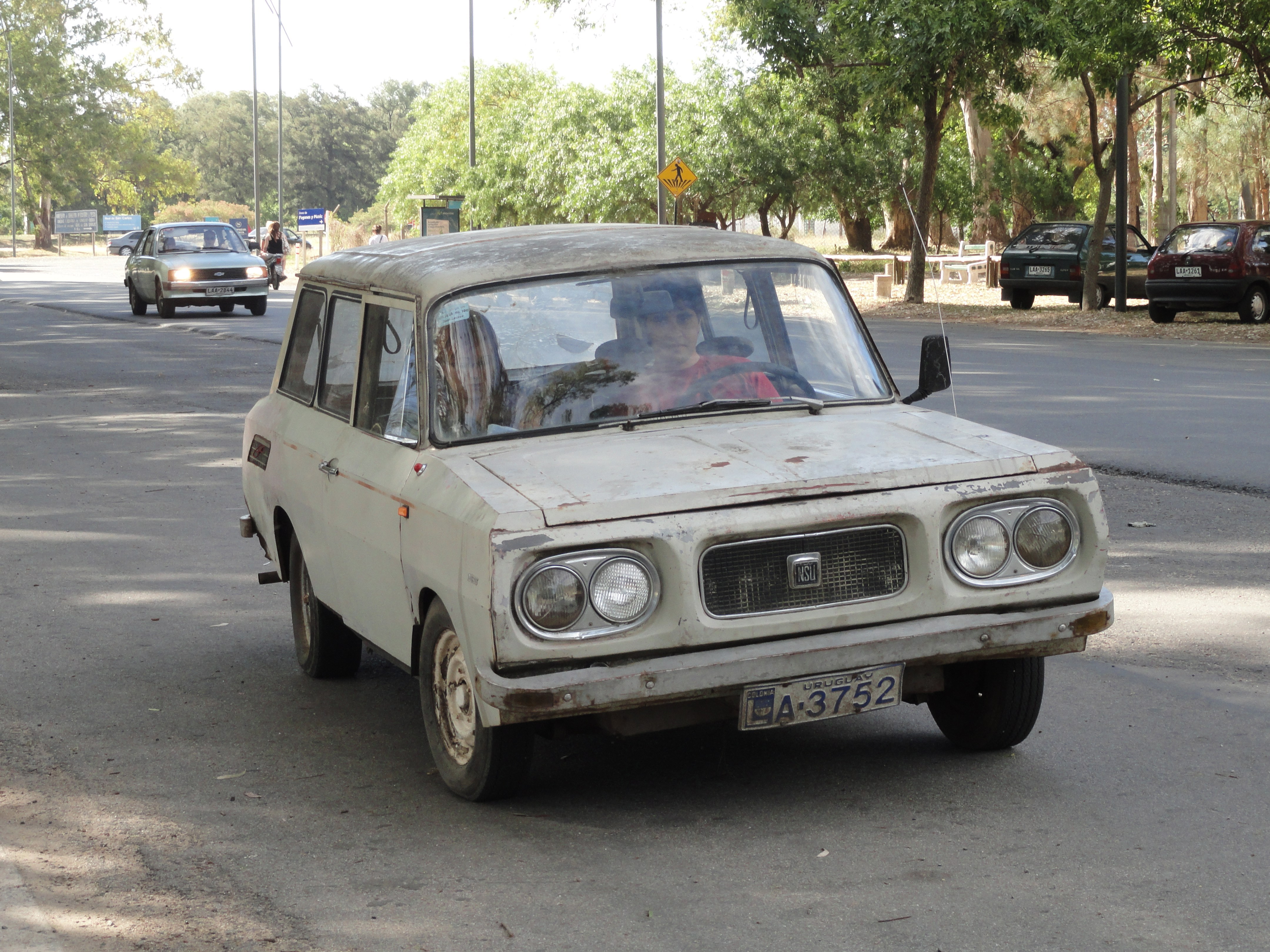
1970 NSU P10, made by Nordex S.A. in Uruguay

The NSU Prinz was also built in Yugoslavia (by PRETIS), Argentina (by Autoar) and Egypt, under licence.

In Uruguay, the Prinz 4 was built by Nordex S.A., and a new model, the P6, combined the engine and mechanics of the NSU model with a separate body completely redesigned by Carlos Sotomayor. From 1970, the P10 was built as the successor model to the NSU P6. This had the larger engine of the NSU Prince 1000 and a 21 cm extended wheelbase.

== NSU motorcycles and scooters ==
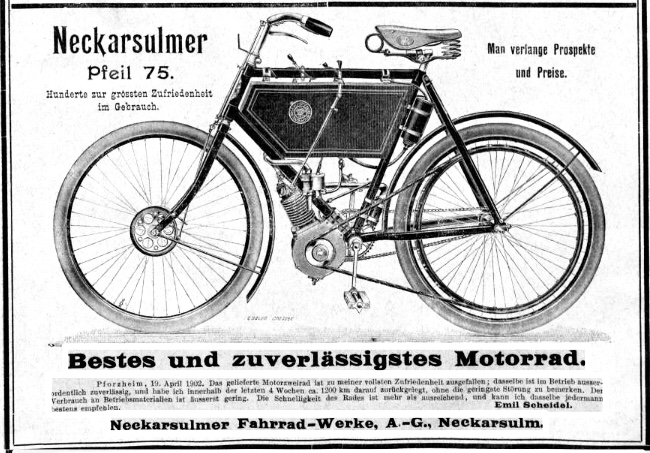
Neckarsumer Pfeil 75 (1902)

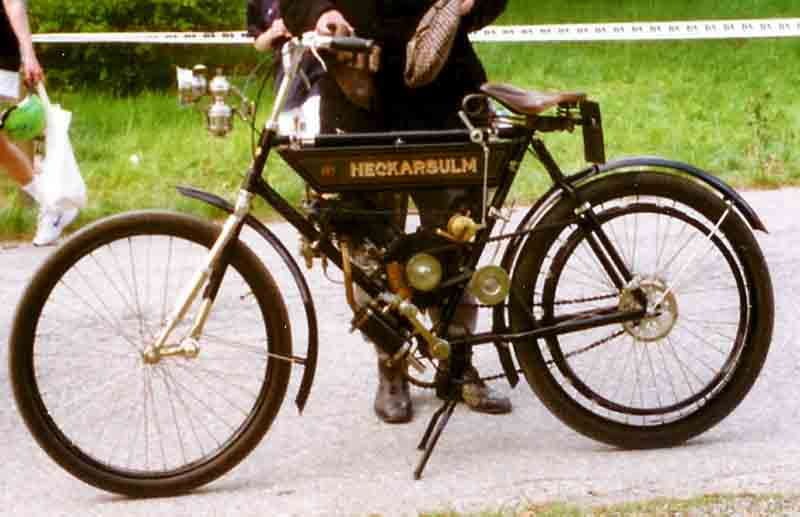
Neckarsulm 1.25 hp (1.27 PS; 0.93 kW) 1908

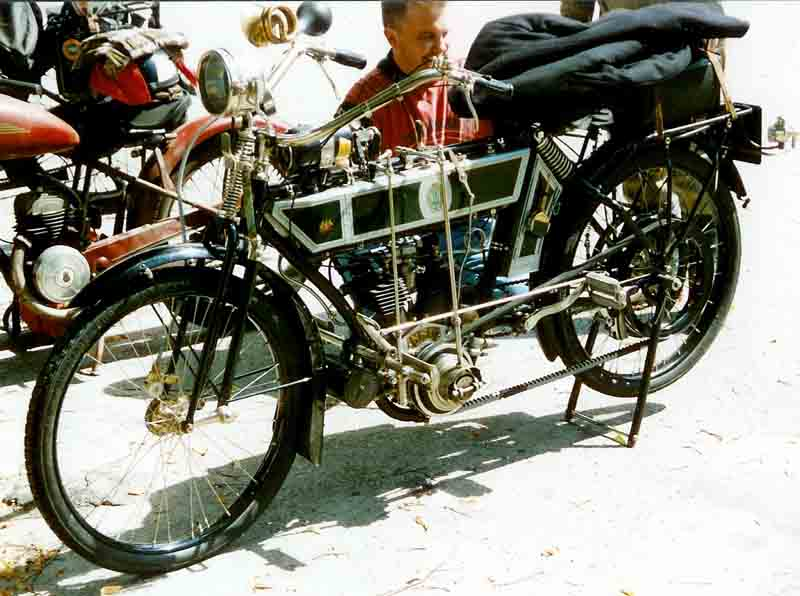
NSU 3 PS (2.96 hp; 2.21 kW) 1911

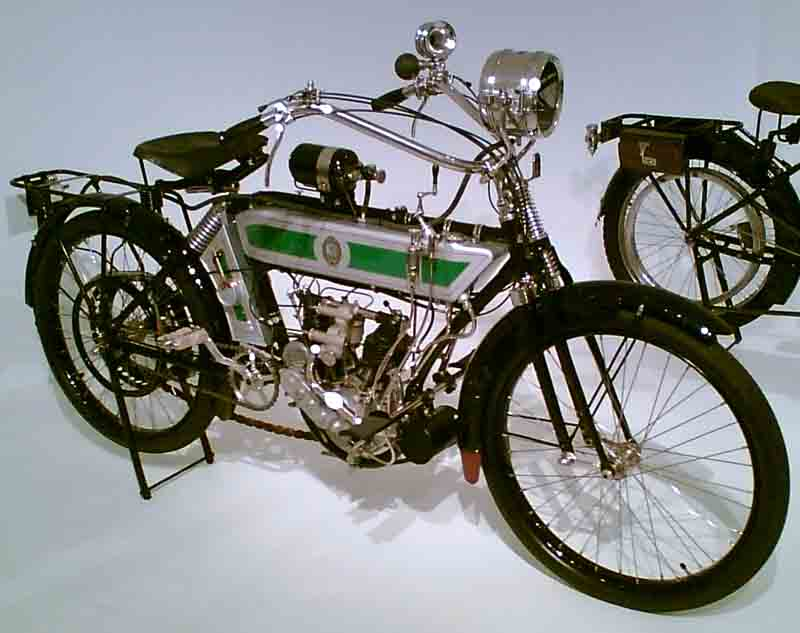
NSU 1913

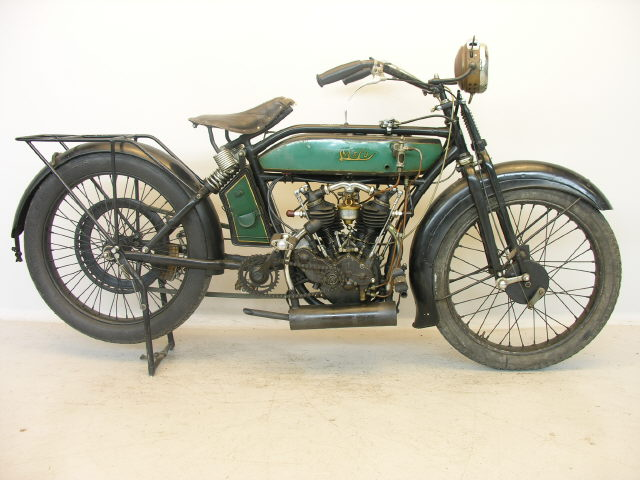
1917 Heeresmodell (Army) PS 5/5, 495 cc (30.2 cu in)

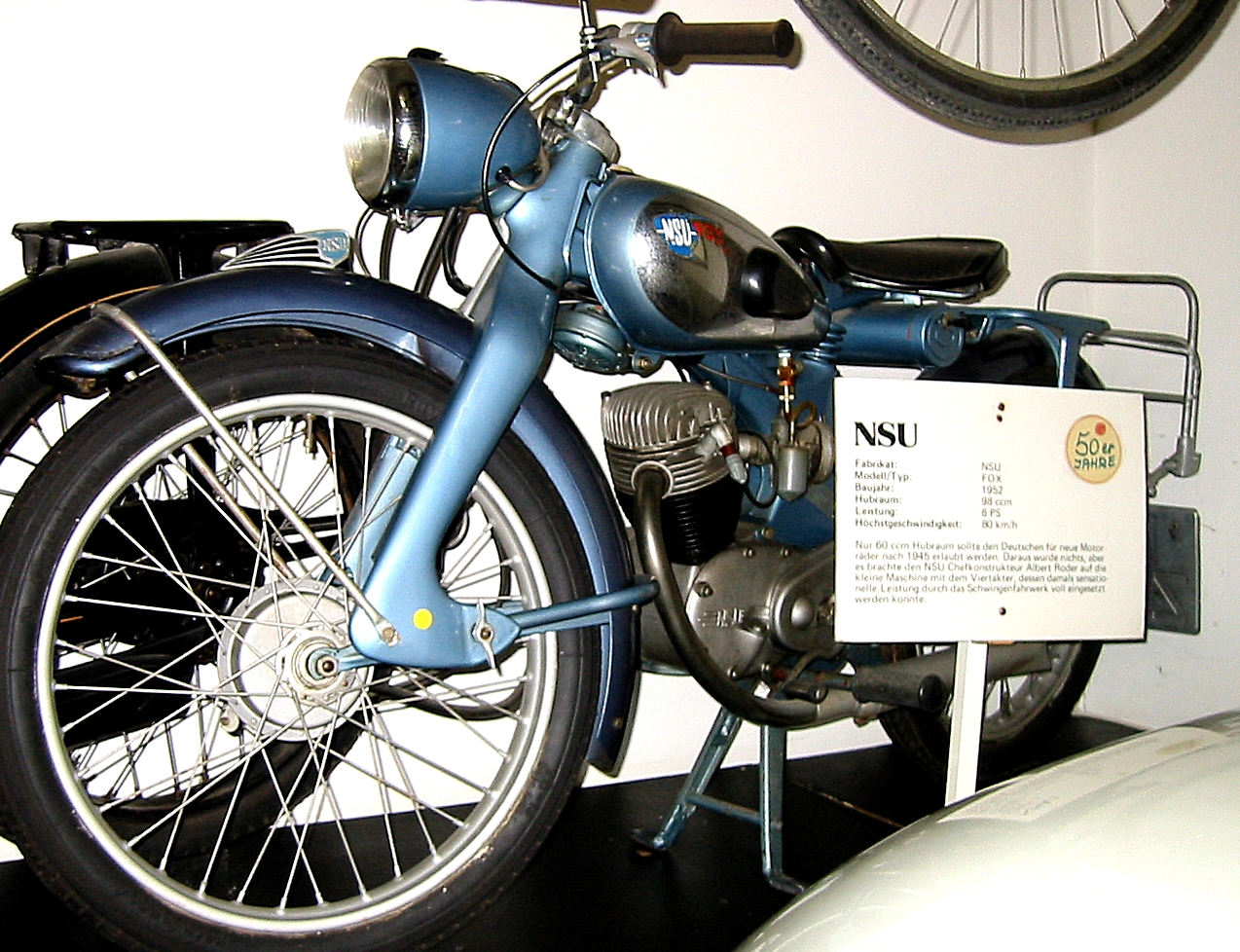
NSU Fox (1952)

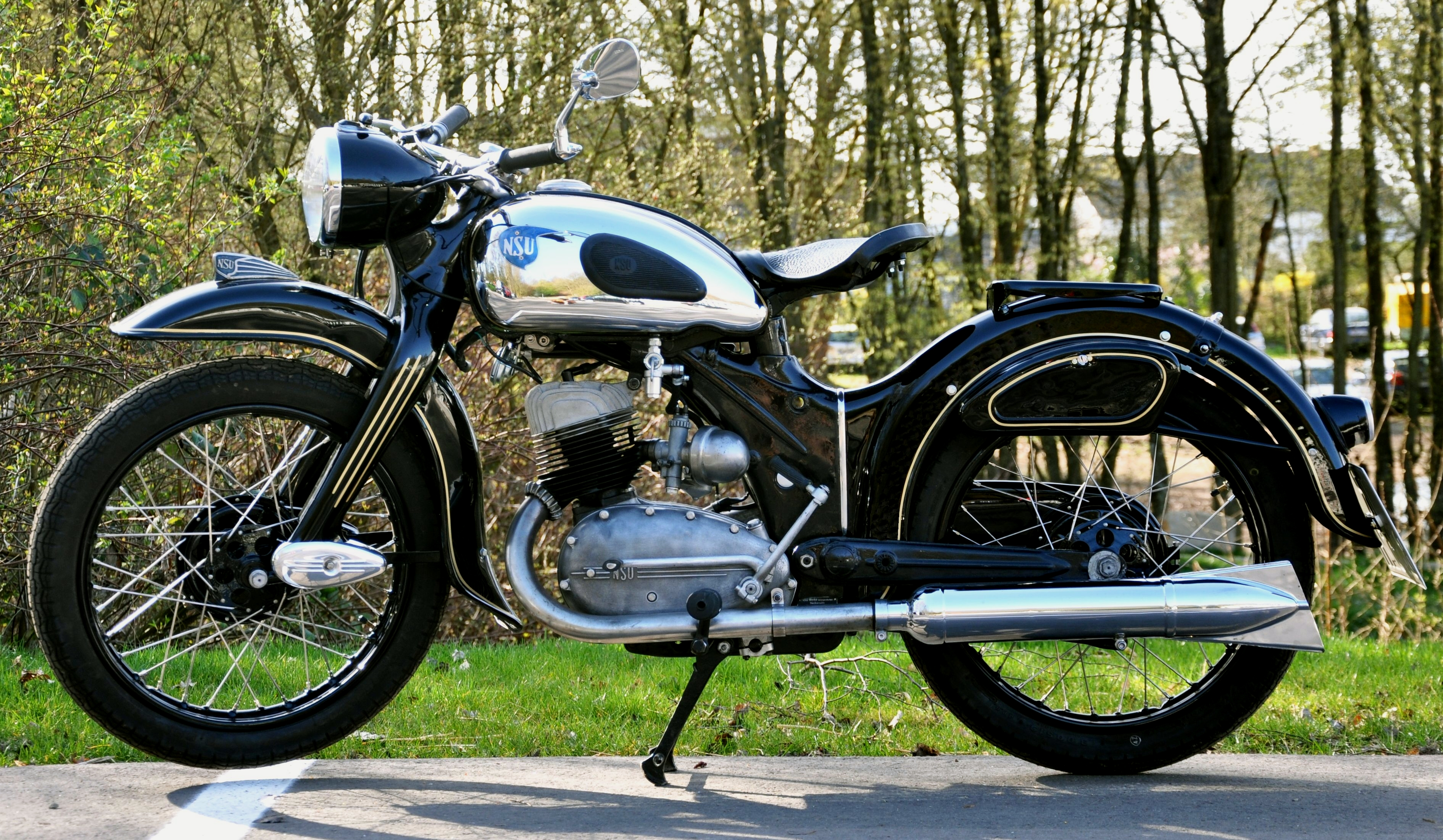
NSU Lux (1952)

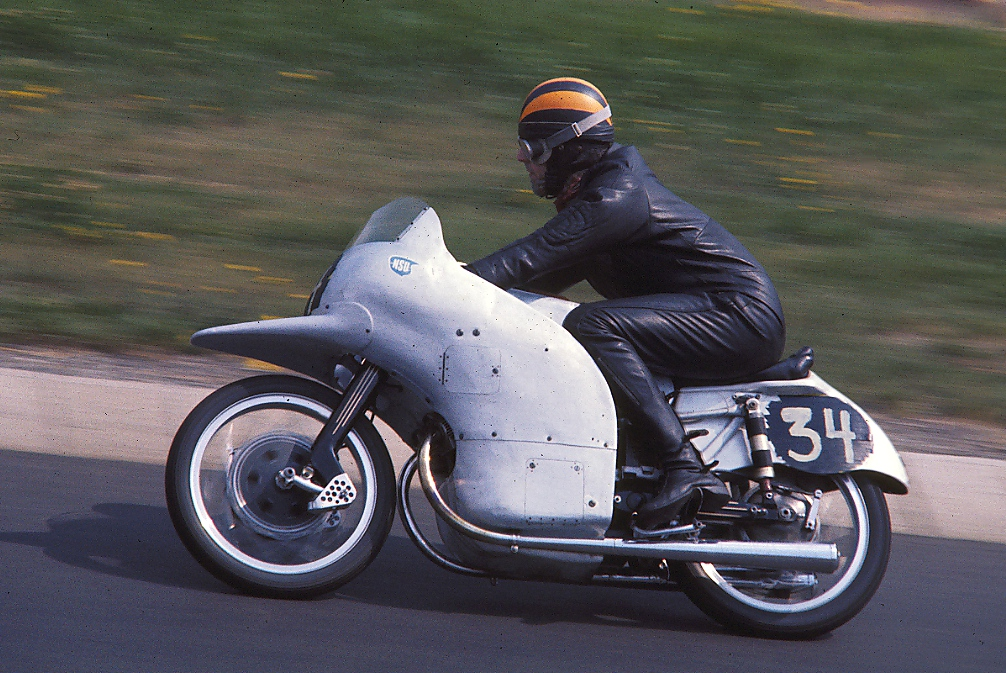
NSU Rennmax G.P. 250 cc (15 cu in) O.H.C. TWIN (1953)

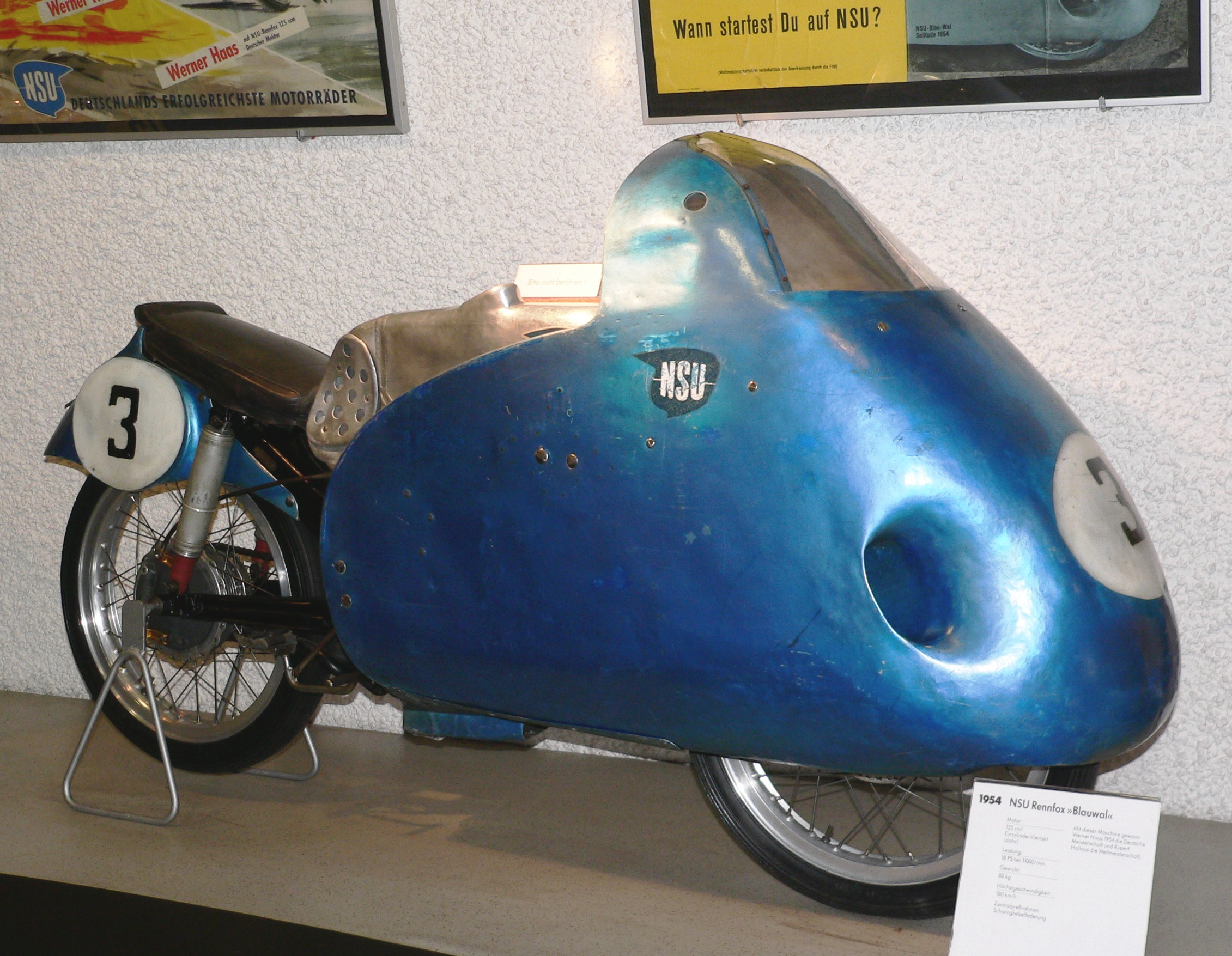
NSU Rennfox G.P. 125 cc (7.6 cu in) O.H.C. TWIN (1954)

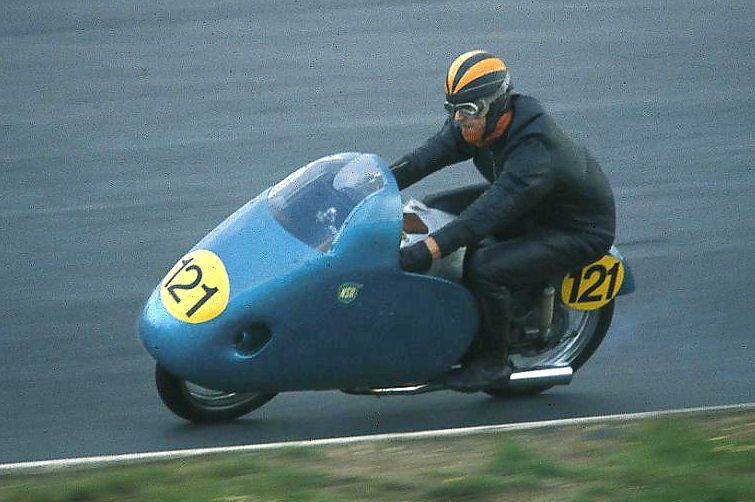
NSU Rennmax G.P. 250 cc (15 cu in) O.H.C. TWIN (1954)

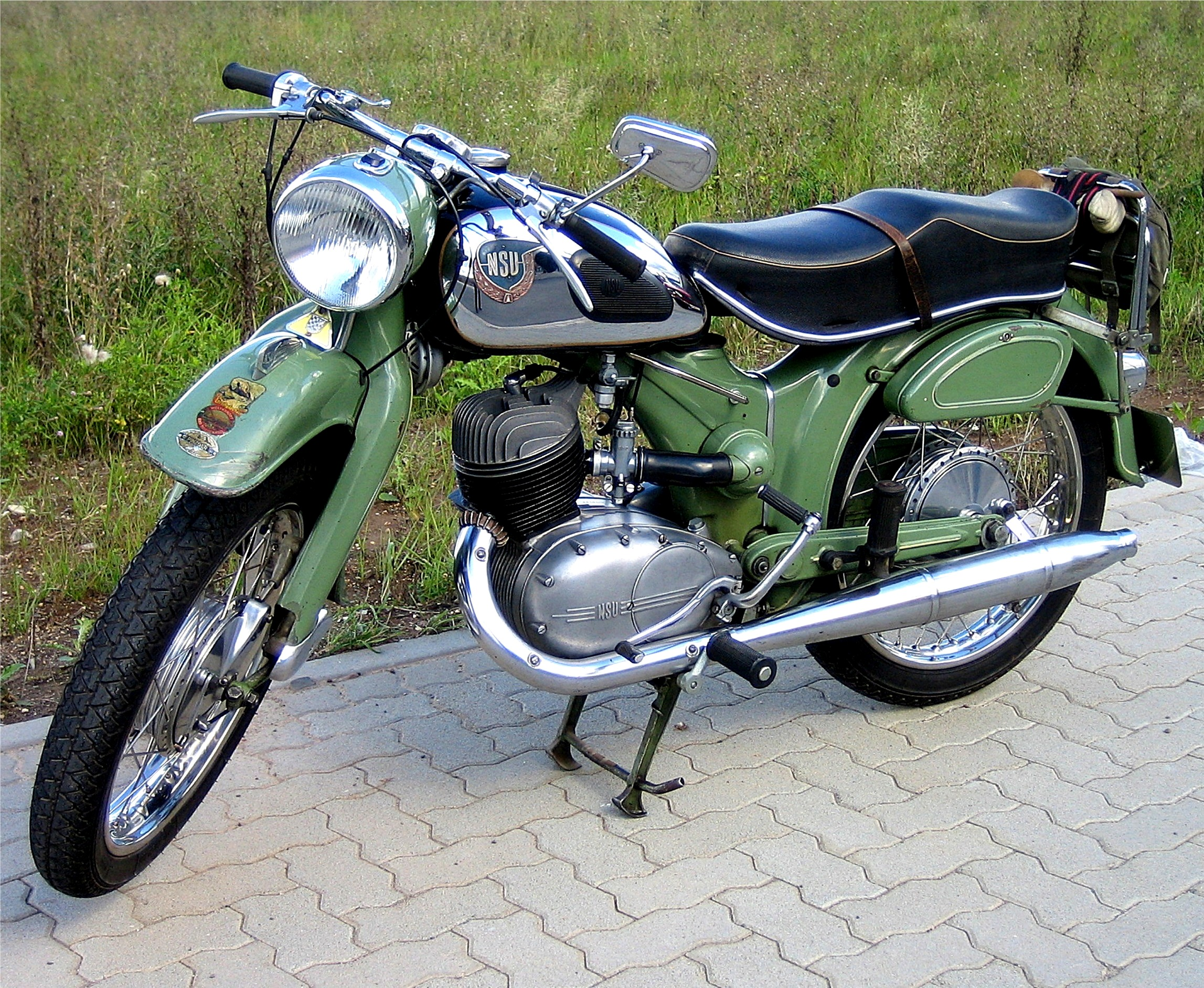
NSU Superlux 250 cc (15 cu in) T/S SINGLE (1955)

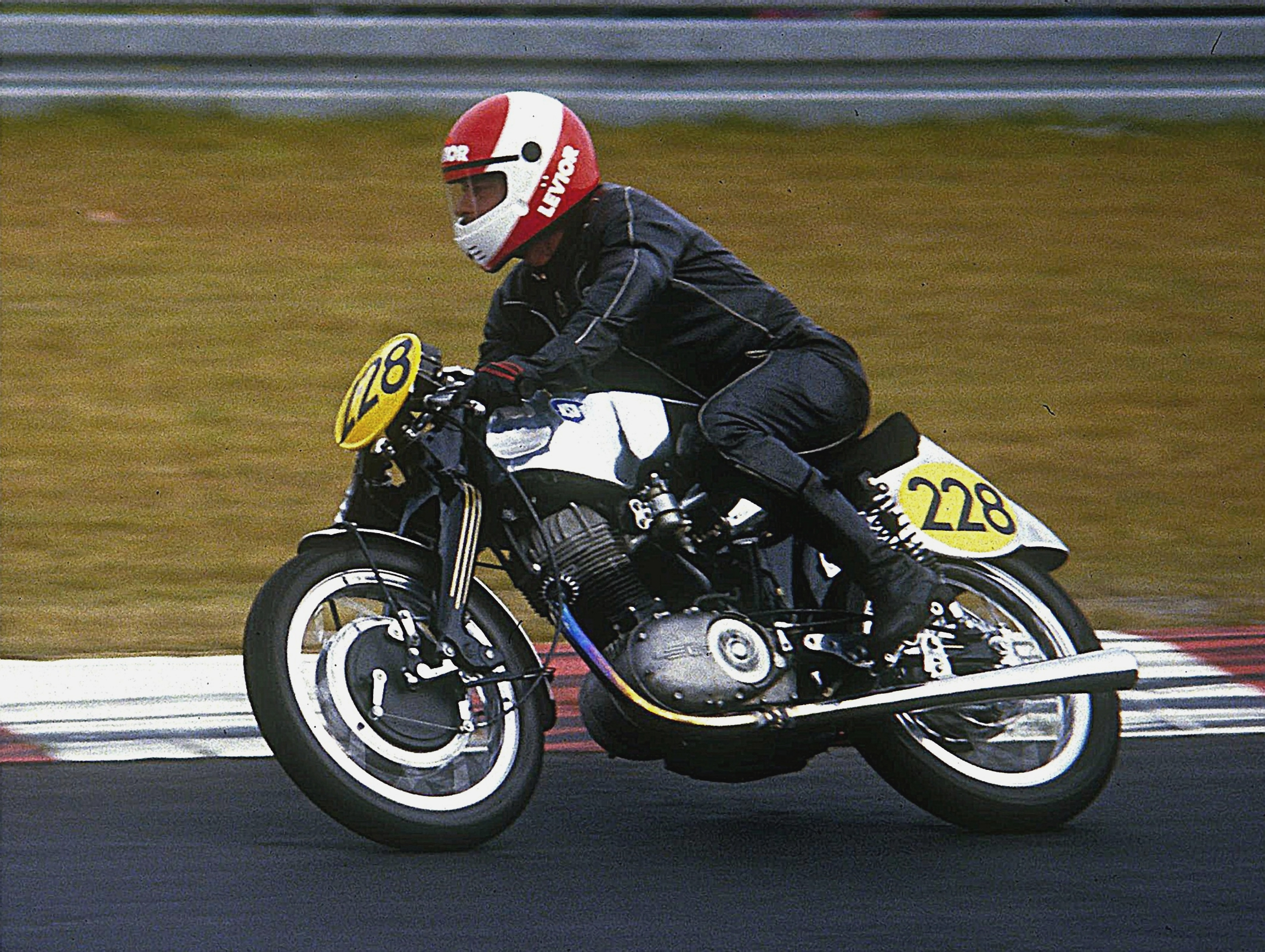
NSU Sportmax G.P. 250 cc (15 cu in) O.H.C. SINGLE (1956)

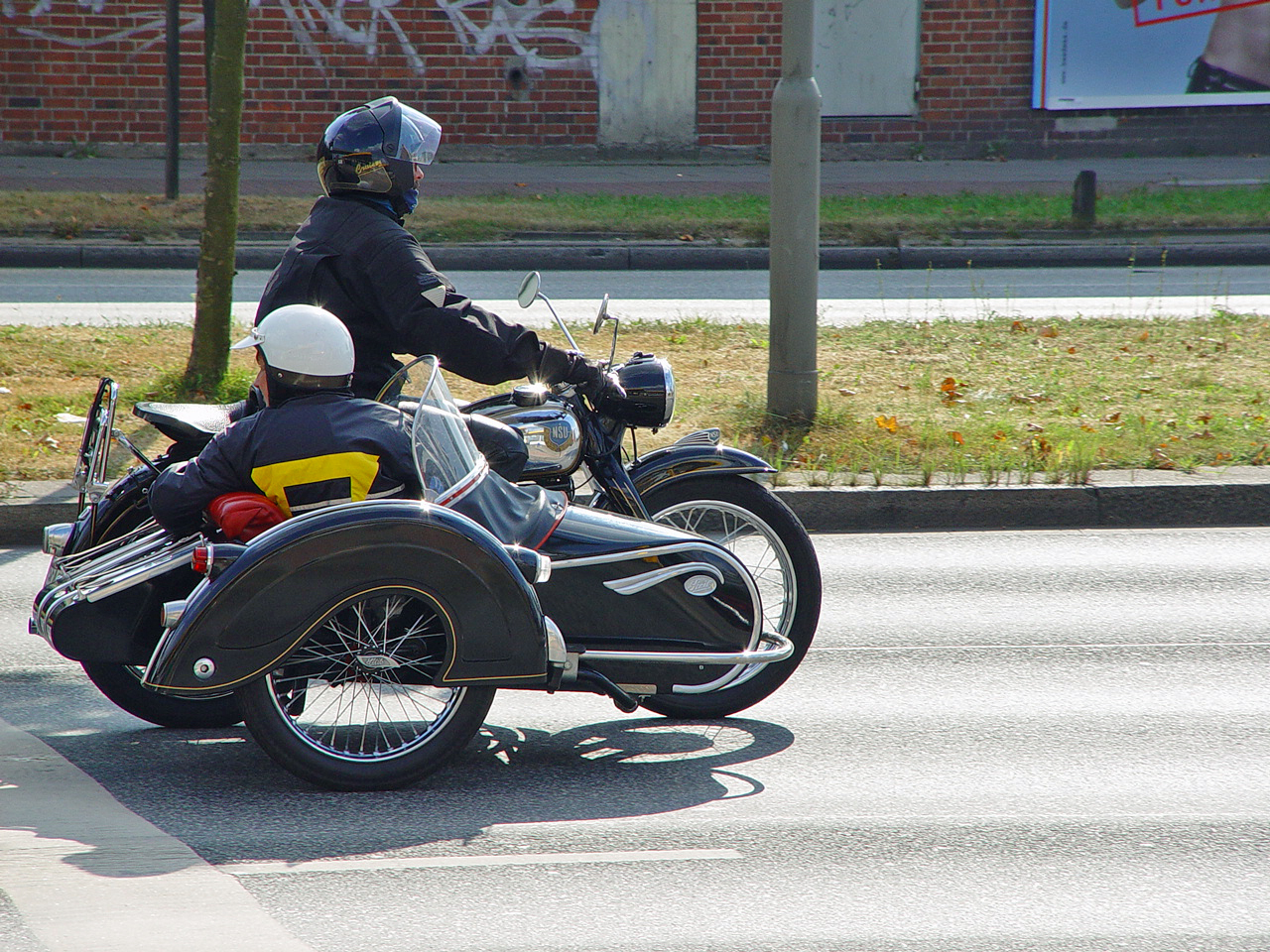
Sidecar (Germany, 2002)

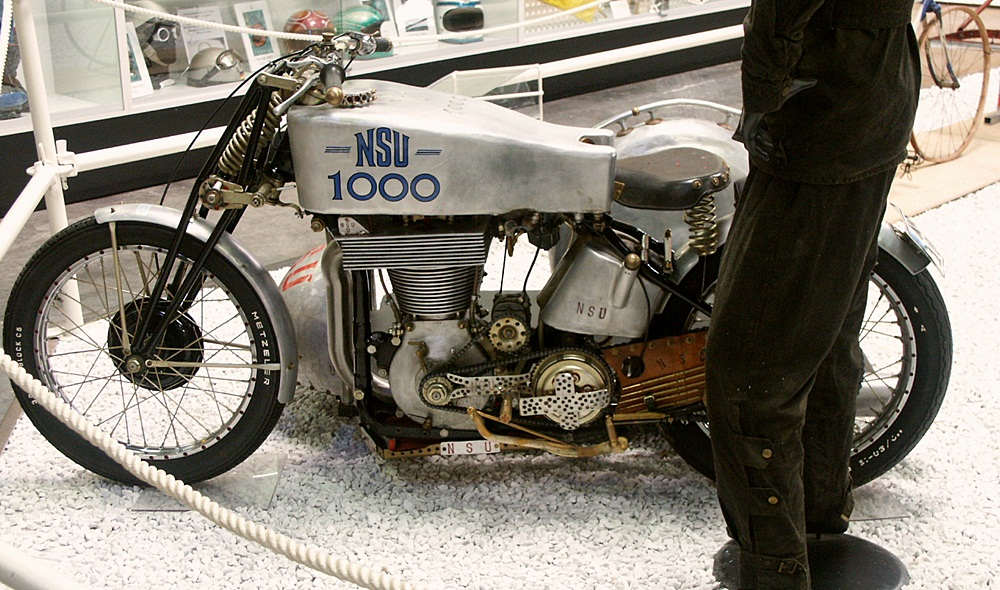
NSU 1000

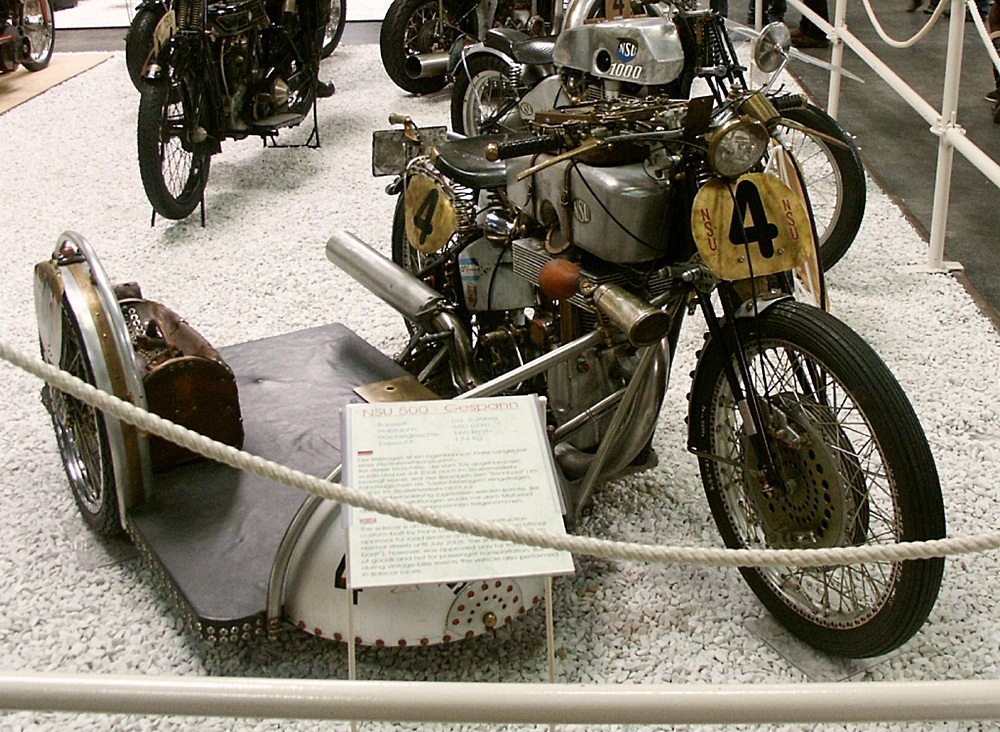
NSU 500

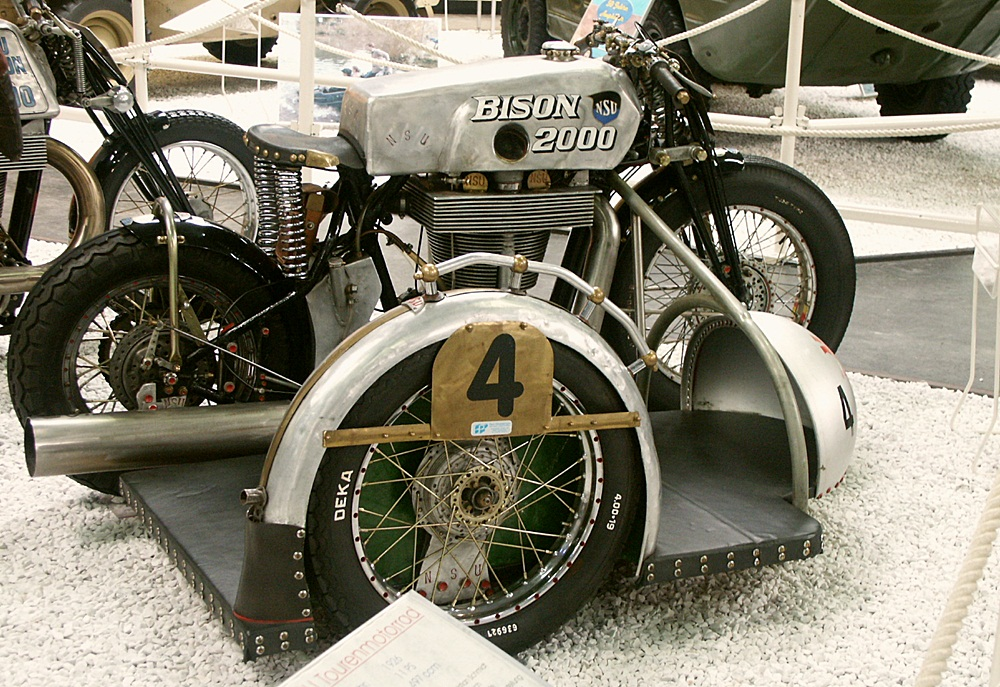
NSU 2000

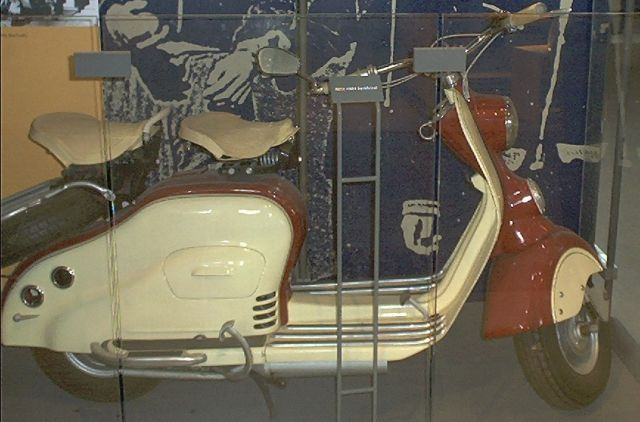
NSU Lambretta Prima D scooter

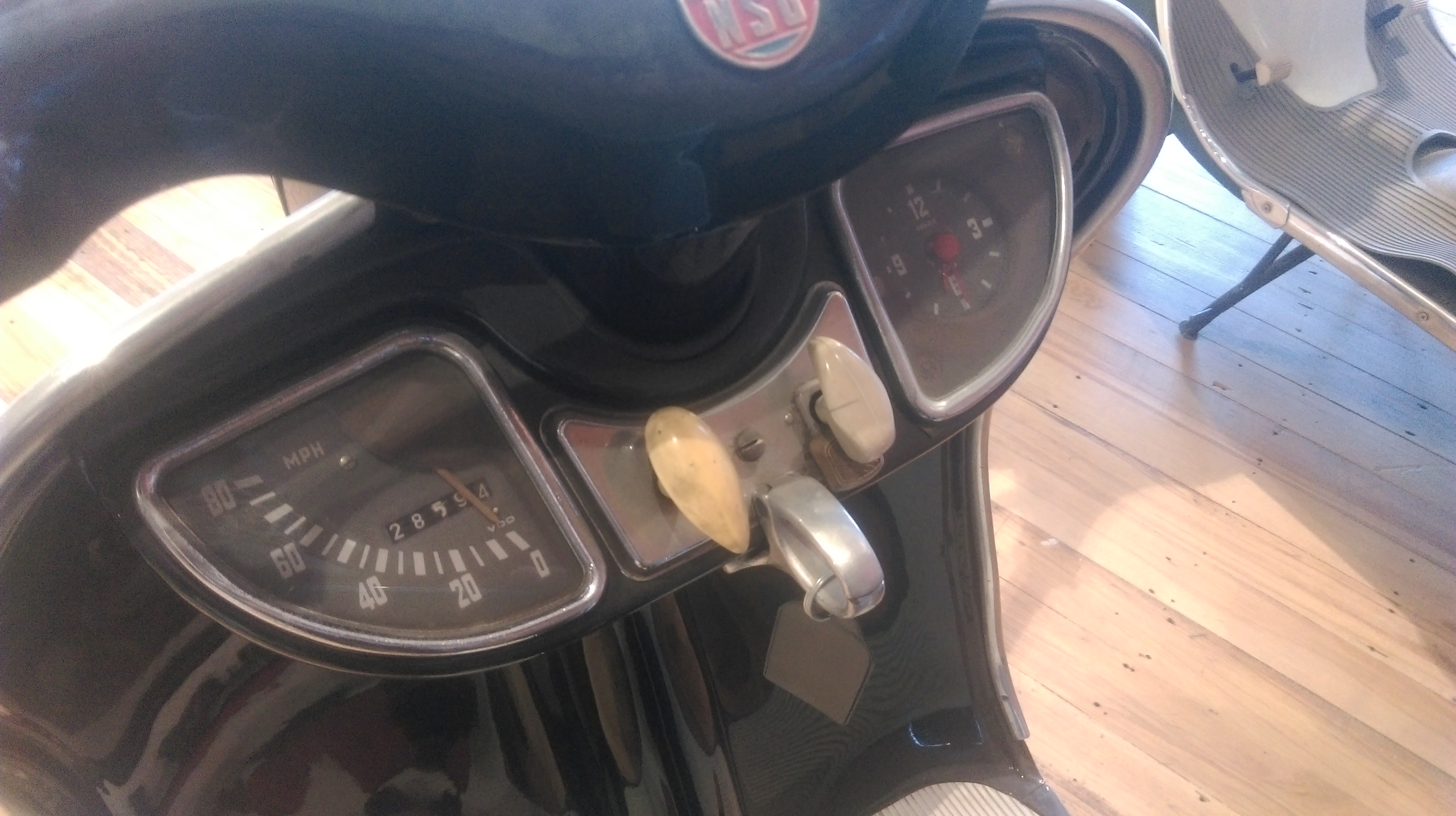
NSU Prima dashboard

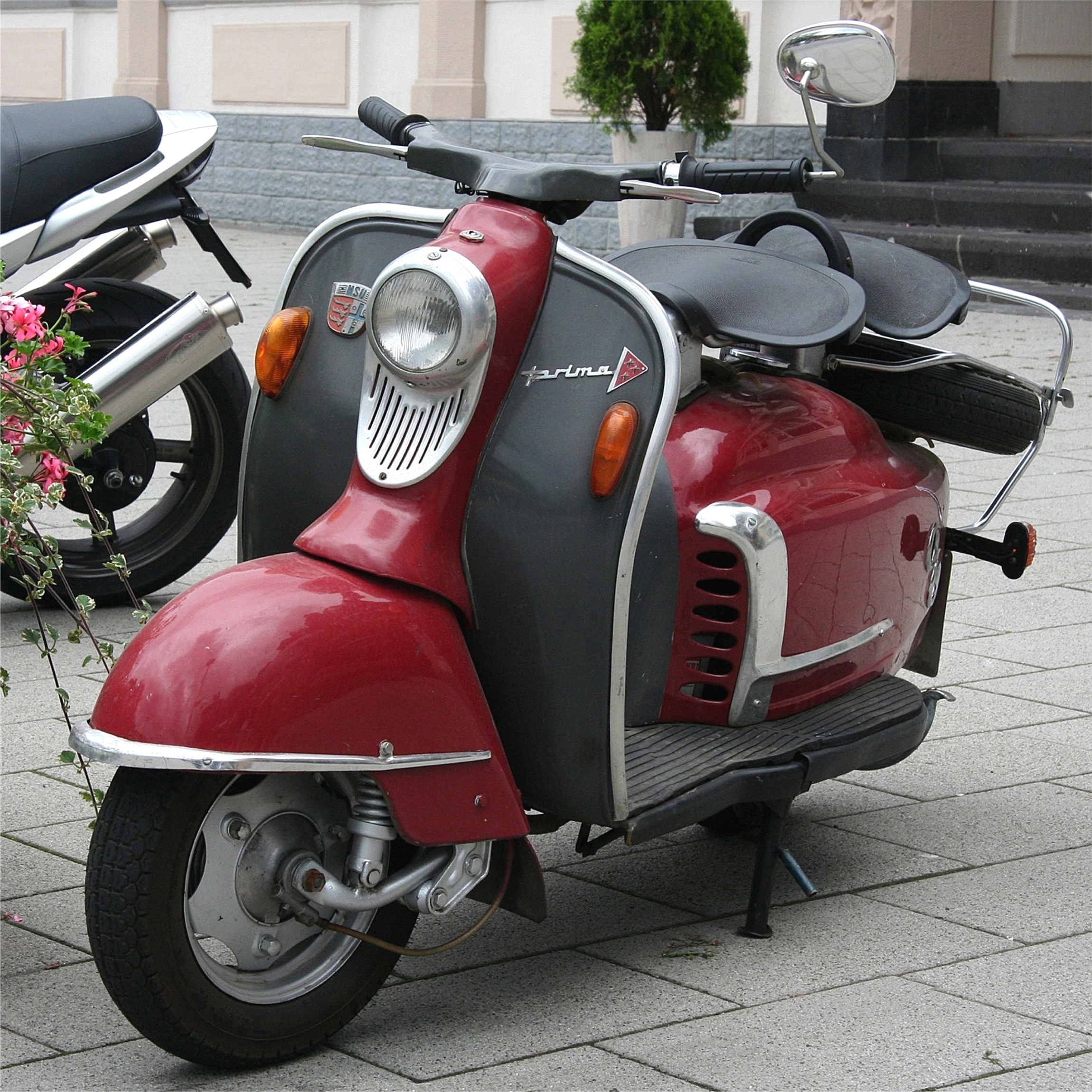
NSU Prima III scooter

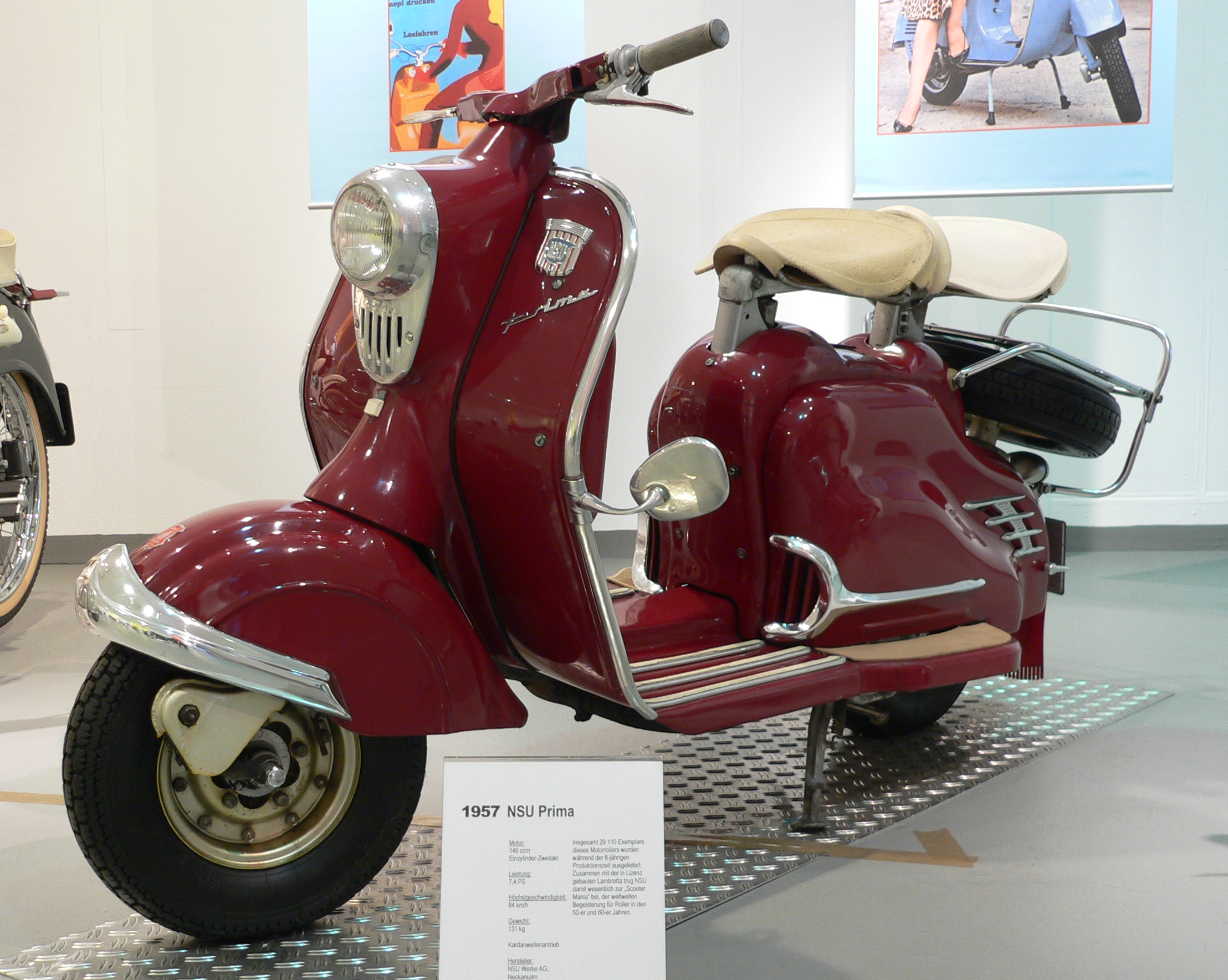
1957 NSU Prima in Deutsches Zweirad- und NSU-Museum

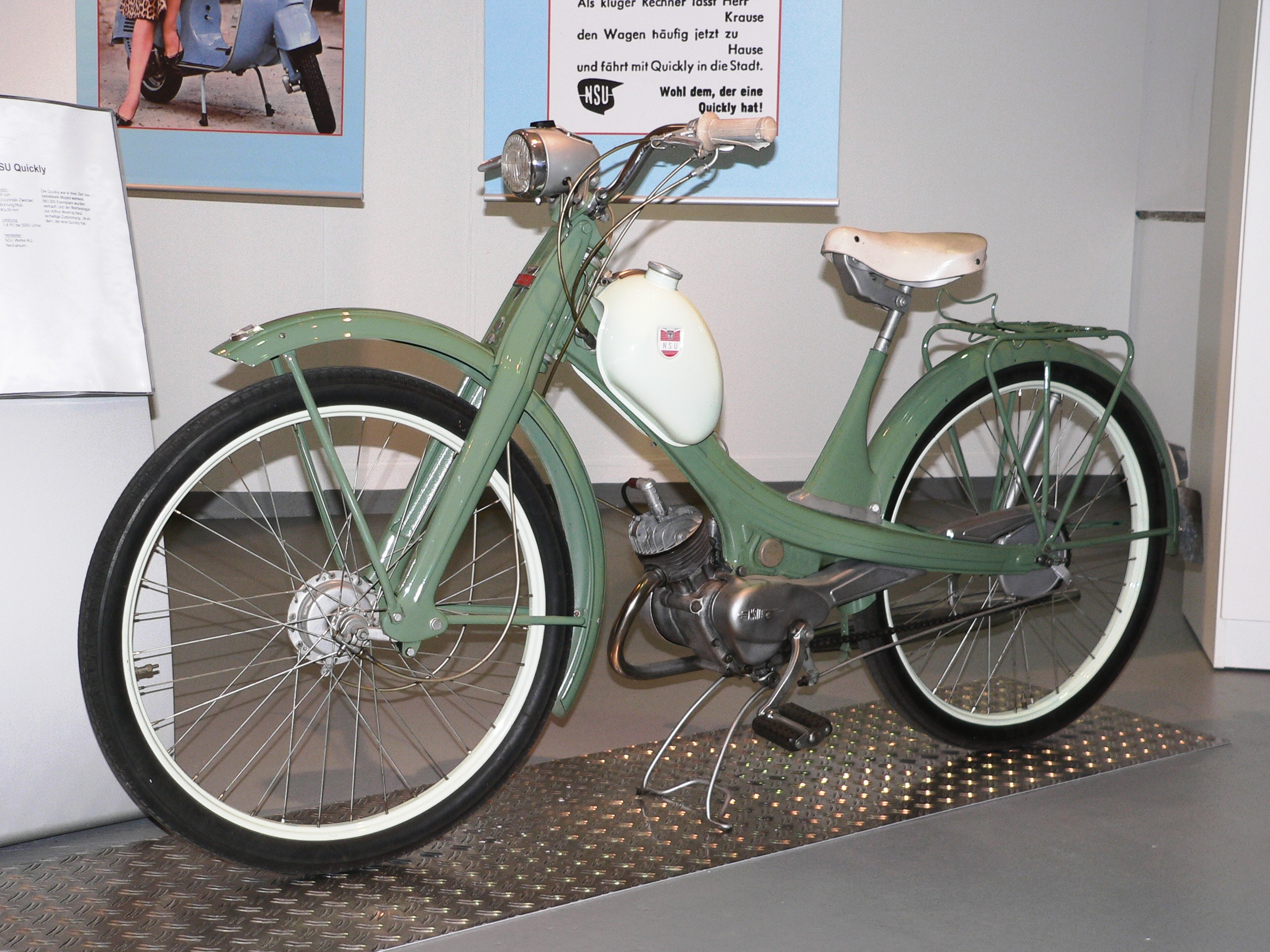
NSU Quickly 50 cc (3.1 cu in) T/S moped (1953)

The first "Neckarsulmer Motorrad" motorcycle was produced in 1901, using a Swiss 1 3/4 hp (1.8 PS; 1.3 kW) Zedel single-cylinder AIV (automatic inlet valve) motor with battery/coil ignition, clamped at the underside of a heavy-duty bicycle frame (of NSU manufacture), with the crankcase slightly below and in front of the pedal crank. Specialized racing motorcycles were campaigned from 1905 in events in Europe, the UK, and USA. In 1907, British manager Martin Geiger rode an NSU in the inaugural Isle of Man TT, placing fifth. NSU had several successes in the Isle of Man TT races in the 1950s. In 1908, an NSU v-twin took part in the Ormonde-Daytona beach speed record races for cars and motorcycles, ridden by Eugene Gaestral, who returned with an improved machine the following year.

In the 1930s, and in the mid-1950s, NSU was the largest motorcycle producer of the world, in its peak year (1955) producing 350,000 machines. NSU holds four world records for speed: 1951, 1953, 1954 and 1955. In 1956, NSU brought a team of six motorcycles of different engine capacities to Bonneville, Utah, to set World Land Speed Records. They had success in all categories, and most notably raised the absolute motorcycle speed record to 211 mph, with Wilhelm Herz piloting the Delphin III, a fully streamlined motorcycle with a 500cc supercharged DOHC twin-cylinder Rennsport engine. This machine still exists, in the Audi Museum in Stuttgart, Germany.

The NSU Quickly was the most popular moped of its time. It was produced between 1953 and 1966 in over 1,000,000 examples and still can be found today all over the world as more than 60% were exported.

== NSU bicycles ==
Bicycle production began in 1900 and continued into the early 1960s.

== NSU military vehicles ==
NSU was the principal maker of the Kettenkrad halftracked motorcycle (1940–1949) The Sd.Kfz. 2 was designed and built by NSU Motorenwerke AG in Neckarsulm, Germany. Designed and patented in June 1939, it was used for the first time during the invasion of the Soviet Union Operation Barbarossa in 1941.

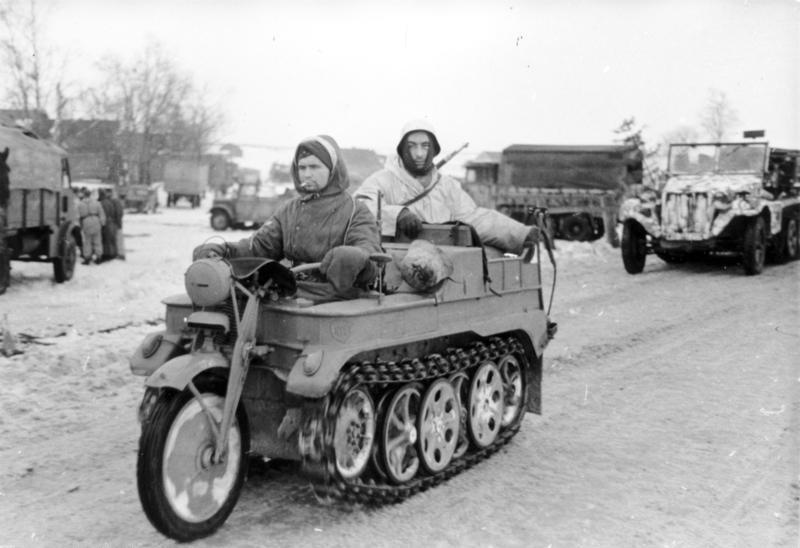

== See also ==
- List of German companies
- List of German cars
- NSU Prima
