= NSU-Pipe 15/24 PS =

Car built by NSU in the years 1906 to 1910

The NSU pipe 15/24 PS was a car which NSU built in the years 1906 to 1910 under license of the Belgian automobile manufacturer Pipe. The 15/24 PS was the successor of the NSU-Pipe 34 PS, and, like it, was targeted at the upper middle class market.

The water-cooled engine was a four-cylinder motor with a displacement of 3768 cm³ (bore × stroke = 100 × 120 mm) which produced 24 PS (17.6 kW). The engine had dual ignition (magneto and battery), automatic central lubrication and overhead valves. The engine power was transmitted to the rear wheels via a leather cone clutch, a four-speed gearbox with a right-hand shift mechanism and a chain. The cars had a wheelbase of 3000-3200 mm, the track was 1450 mm and the weight in the case of the double phaeton was 1650 kg. The top speed was about 70 km / h.

In addition to the Double-Phaeton version, the cars were produced in Roi-des-Belges, Landaulet or Sedan (saloon) body styles. In 1910 their production was discontinued without a direct successor in favor of smaller cars of NSU's own design.
