= NSU-Pipe 25/40 PS =

Car

The NSU Pipe 25/40 PS was a car intended for upper class customers, which NSU built in the years 1908 and 1909 under the license of the Belgian automobile manufacturer Pipe. This was the first - and for a long time only - six-cylinder model of the brand and the only car ever built by NSU for the upper class.

The water-cooled engine was a six-cylinder motor with a displacement of 6494 cm^{3} (bore × stroke = 105 × 125 mm), which produced 40 PS (29 kW) at 1100 rpm. The engine had magneto ignition, automatic central lubrication and overhead valves. The power was transmitted to the rear wheels via a leather cone clutch, a three-speed gearbox with a right-hand shift mechanism and a chain. The wheelbase of the car was 3280 mm, the track was 1457 mm and the weight of the chassis was 1100 kg. The top speed was about 100 km / h.

The cars were only produced as a double phaeton. In 1909, its production was discontinued without a successor.
