= NSU Quick 50 =

Light motorcycle manufactured by NSU Motorenwerke AG

- Manufacturer: NSU Motorenwerke AG
- Production: 1962 - 1965
- Predecessor: NSU Quickly
- Class: Moped / light motorcycle
- Engine: 50 cc (3.1 cu in) two-stroke single
- Top speed: 70 km/h (43 mph)
- Power: 4.3 PS (3.2 kW)
- Transmission: 4 speed manual, foot-shift
- Suspension: Front: leading link with twin shocks Rear: swingarm with twin shocks
- Brakes: 125 mm (4.9 in) single leading shoe drum, front and rear
- Tires: 23 x 2.50 front and rear
- Wheelbase: 49 in (1,245 mm)
- Dimensions: L: 1,860 mm (73.2 in); W: 600 mm (23.6 in); H: 930 mm (36.6 in)
- Seat height: 31 in (787 mm)
- Weight: 80 kg (176 lb) (dry)
- Fuel capacity: 11.8 L (3.1 US gal)
- Oil capacity: 1:25 mixture with petrol
- Related: NSU Quickly TT/K

The NSU Quick 50 was a light motorcycle manufactured by NSU Motorenwerke AG. NSU started producing the Quick 50 in Neckarsulm, Germany in 1962. 9,323 Quick 50 motorcycles were built before NSU stopped manufacturing motorcycles in 1965. Having produced bikes and automobiles since 1873, NSU was purchased by Volkswagen and was merged with Auto Union in 1969 to create Audi. To this day NSU bikes are sought as collectors' pieces, and for some still serve as functioning modes of transportation.

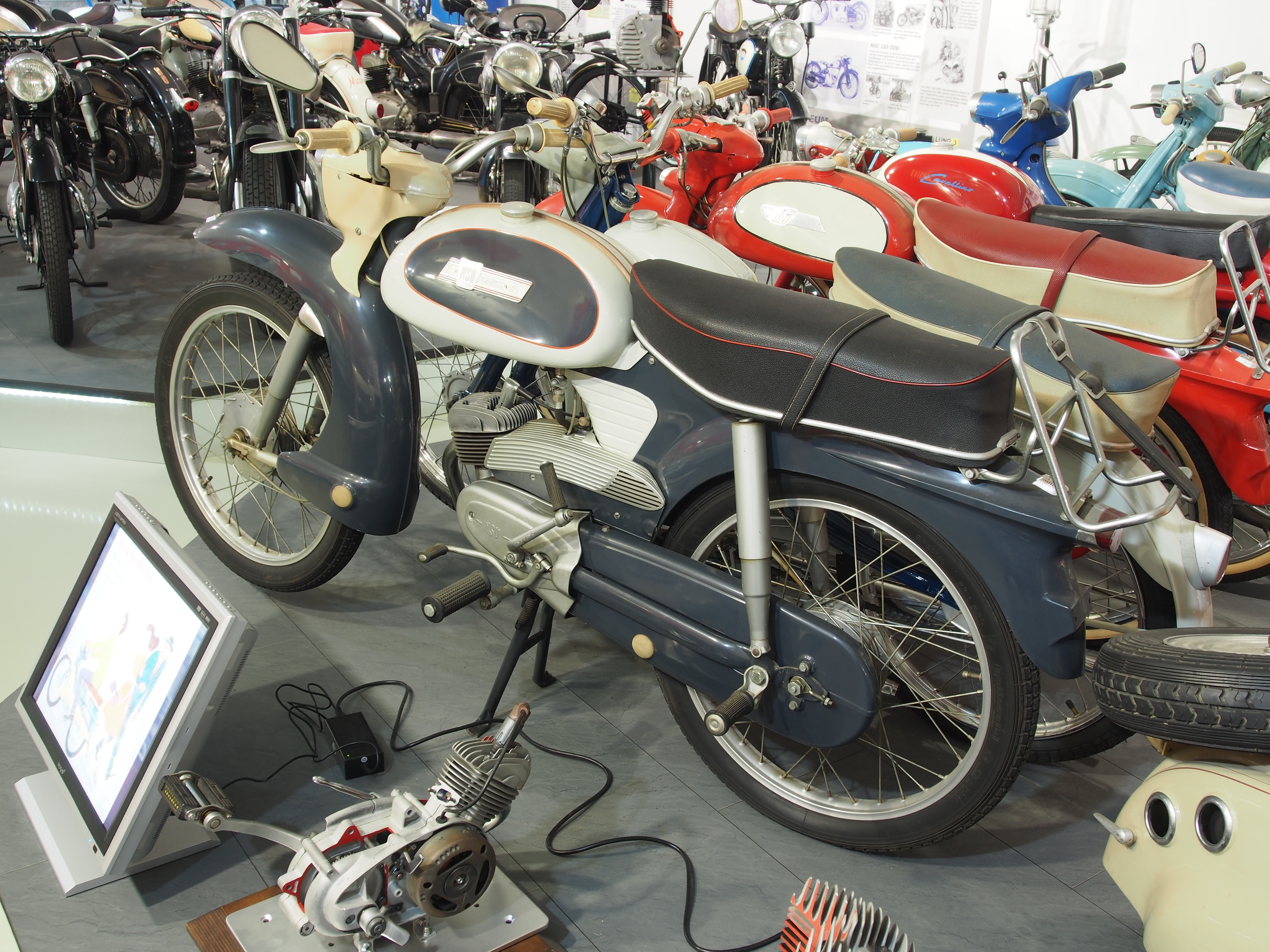
NSU Quick 50

== Quickly models ==
The Quick 50 was released around the same time as the Quickly-N-23. Both came as successors to a long line of lightweight bikes that started with the Quickly-N in 1953, which sold under 10,000 models in 1953, over 100,000 models in 1954 and over 200,000 models in 1955. The Quickly-N was followed by the Quickly-L, the Quickly-Cavalino, the Quickly TT and the Quickly S; together, these variations sold close to 800,000 models. The Quickly-N-23 was the last variation made by NSU that resembled the previous variations. The Quick 50 was the last motorcycle built by NSU after a 12-year run that produced over 1.1 million bikes in Quickly variations.

== Quick-50 specs ==
While the Quickly-N-23 was a reworking of the previous models the Quick 50 was the last new design from NSU. Despite the new design the frame of the Quick 50 was developed from the frame previously used in the NSU Quickly TT. With 12 years of experience creating and releasing new motorcycles into the market NSU had gauged what was vital to the performance of the motorcycle and what was not. Outside of the frame, the Quick 50 varied vastly from the other bikes produced by NSU. The engine differed in stroke (50 cc, two stroke), displacement (50 ccm), and compression ratio (0.0536 HP/kg), and delivered power through a four-speed transmission which reached velocities of up to 45 miles per hour.

The Quick 50 engine did not have pedals. As a result, the Quick 50 was not considered to be a moped in countries whose legal definition of a moped included the presence of pedals, as Germany's did. However, the moped market in the UK was booming and the company made a lot of sales to their friends to the West.
