= NSU Quickly =

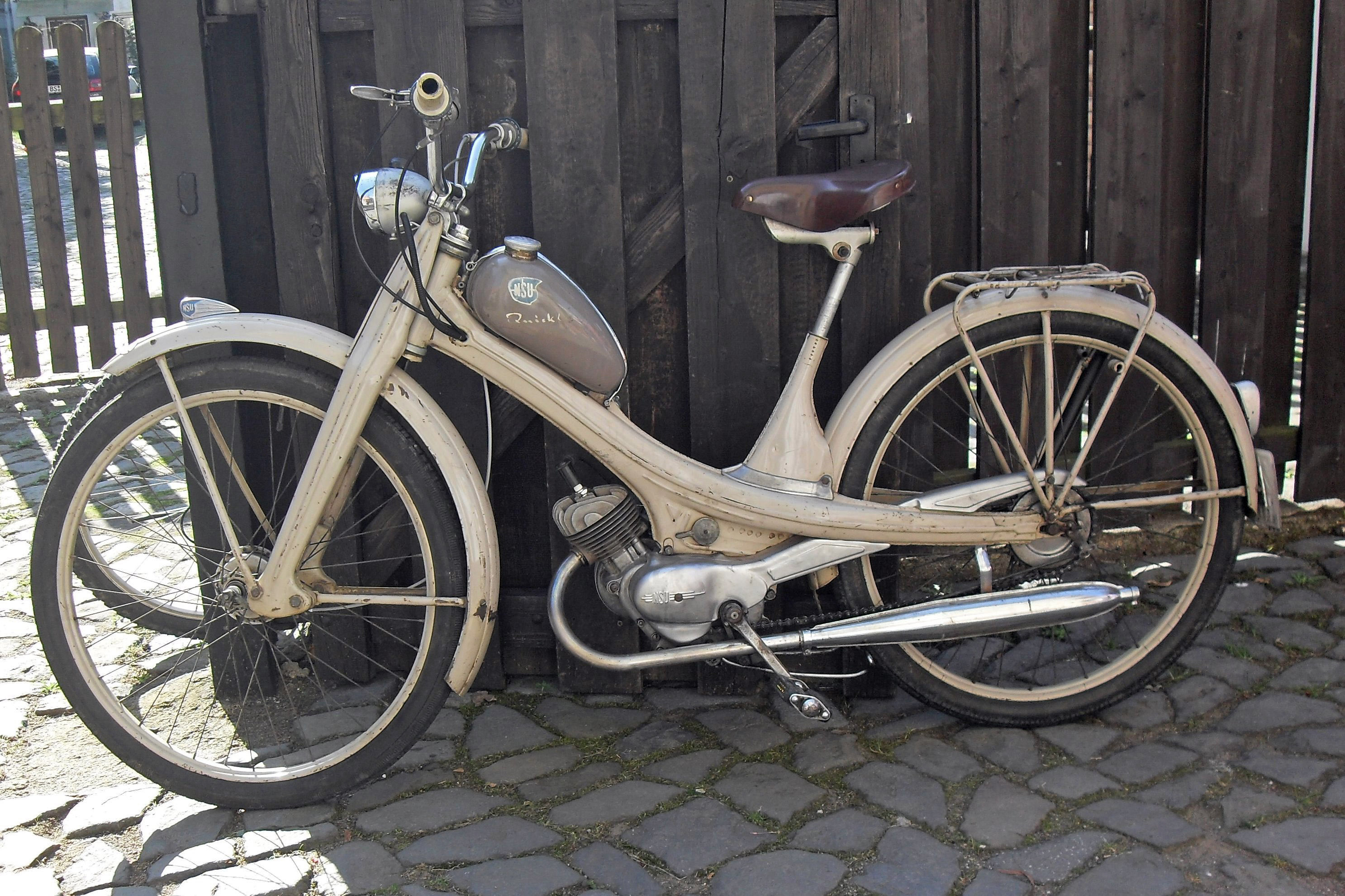
- Manufacturer: NSU Motorenwerke AG
- Production: 1953-1968 (post 2nd world war)
- Predecessor: NSU Quick
- Successor: NSU Quick 50
- Class: moped
- Engine: 49 cc (3.0 cu in)
- Top speed: 50 km/h (31 mph)
- Transmission: 2 or 3 speed manual, twistgrip operated
- Suspension: Front: leading link Rear: none
- Brakes: Drum/drum

The NSU Quickly was a moped manufactured by NSU Motorenwerke AG of Germany from 1953 to 1968. More than one million Quicklys were sold.

== Construction ==
The Quickly frame was a pressed-steel single spar unit with a headset at the front of the unit and wheel attachment points at the end of the arms at the rear of the unit. The unit also incorporated a tower in which the seat post was mounted and attachment points for the motor unit and the petrol tank.

The front forks of the Quickly were made from pressed steel and were fitted with leading-link suspension.

The motor unit included a 49 cc (3.0 cu in) two-stroke engine, a two-speed transmission (three-speed on some models), a bicycle pedal assembly to start the engine and assist propulsion up hills, and a centrestand.

=== Other frames: Cavallino and T ===
The Quickly Cavallino, the Quickly T, the Quickly TT and the Quickly TT/K did not use the same frame as the other Quickly models. The Cavallino had a tubular steel frame similar to a conventional motorcycle, but without a downtube. The T had a unique unit frame including a front tube and a rear fender. The TT and TT/K used the Cavallino frame.

== Variations ==
The Quickly was made in several levels of trim.

=== Quickly N ===
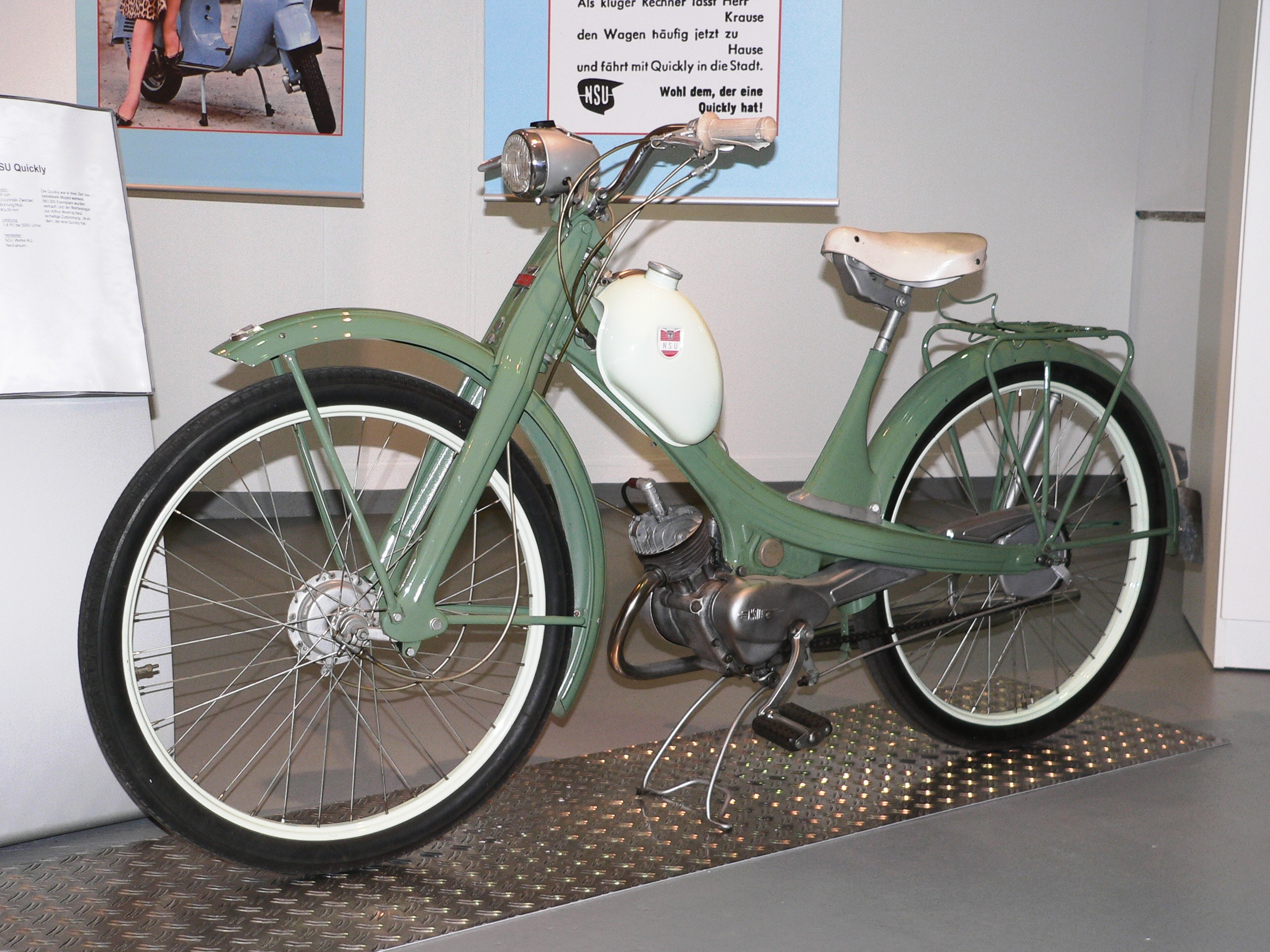
NSU Quickly N

The original and most basic version of the Quickly was the Quickly N. It used the original version of the engine, with a 5.5:1 compression ratio, which produced 1.4 PS (1.0 kW) at 4600 rpm. The N had a two-speed transmission that was operated from the handlebar. It ran on 26 x 2.00" wheels front and rear. 539,793 Quickly N mopeds were manufactured from 1953 to 1962.

=== Quickly S ===
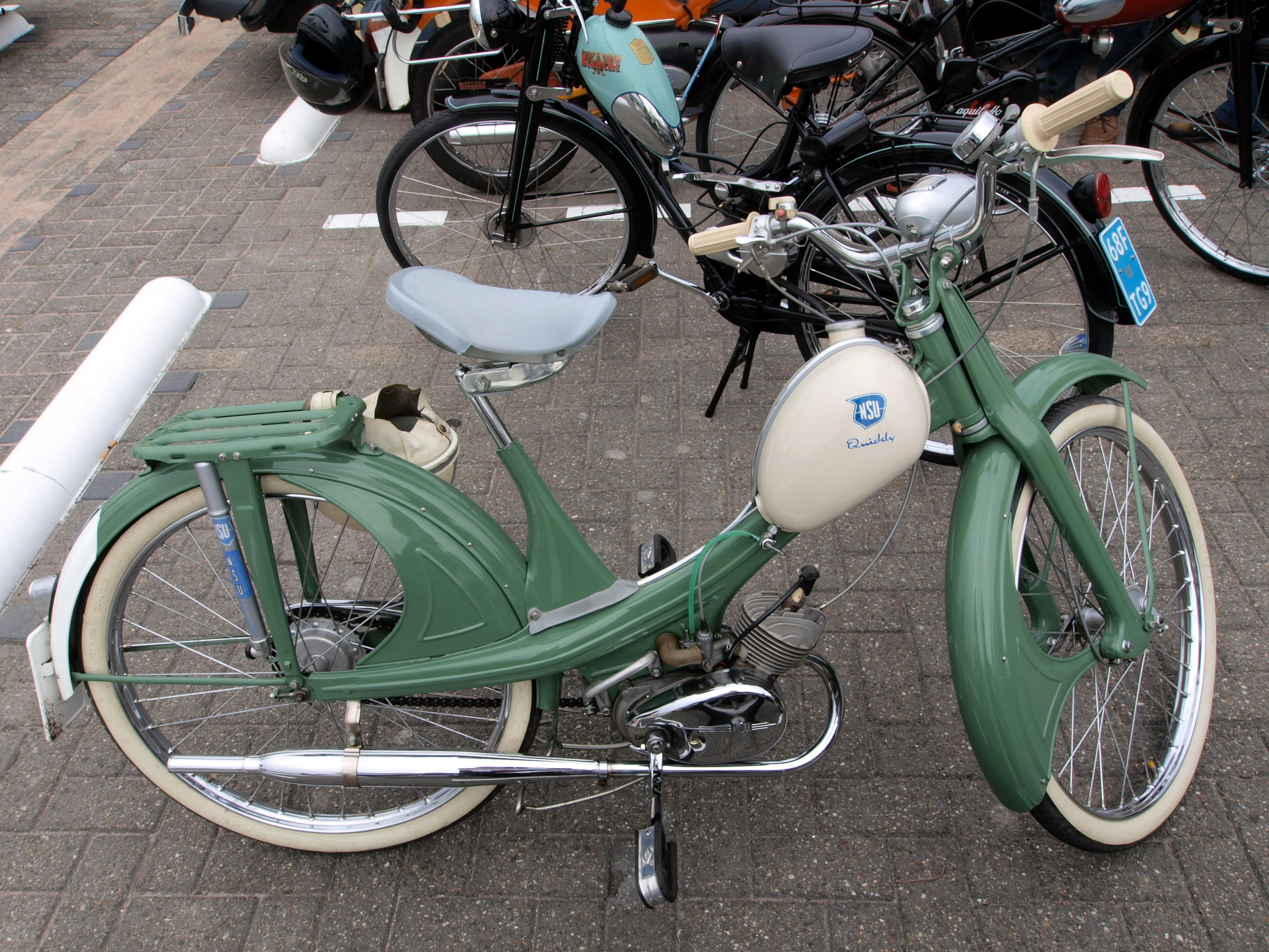
NSU Quickly S

The S was basically a N with larger fenders, a speedometer, a side stand, and chrome-plated rims. 314,715 Quickly S mopeds were manufactured from 1955 to 1962.

==== Van Oorschot variant ====
Van Oorschot, the Dutch importer of the NSU Quickly, assembled a Dutch version of the Quickly with front fender of the Quickly L, a different luggage carrier on the rear, and the rare 25 x 2.25" wheels.

=== Quickly L ===
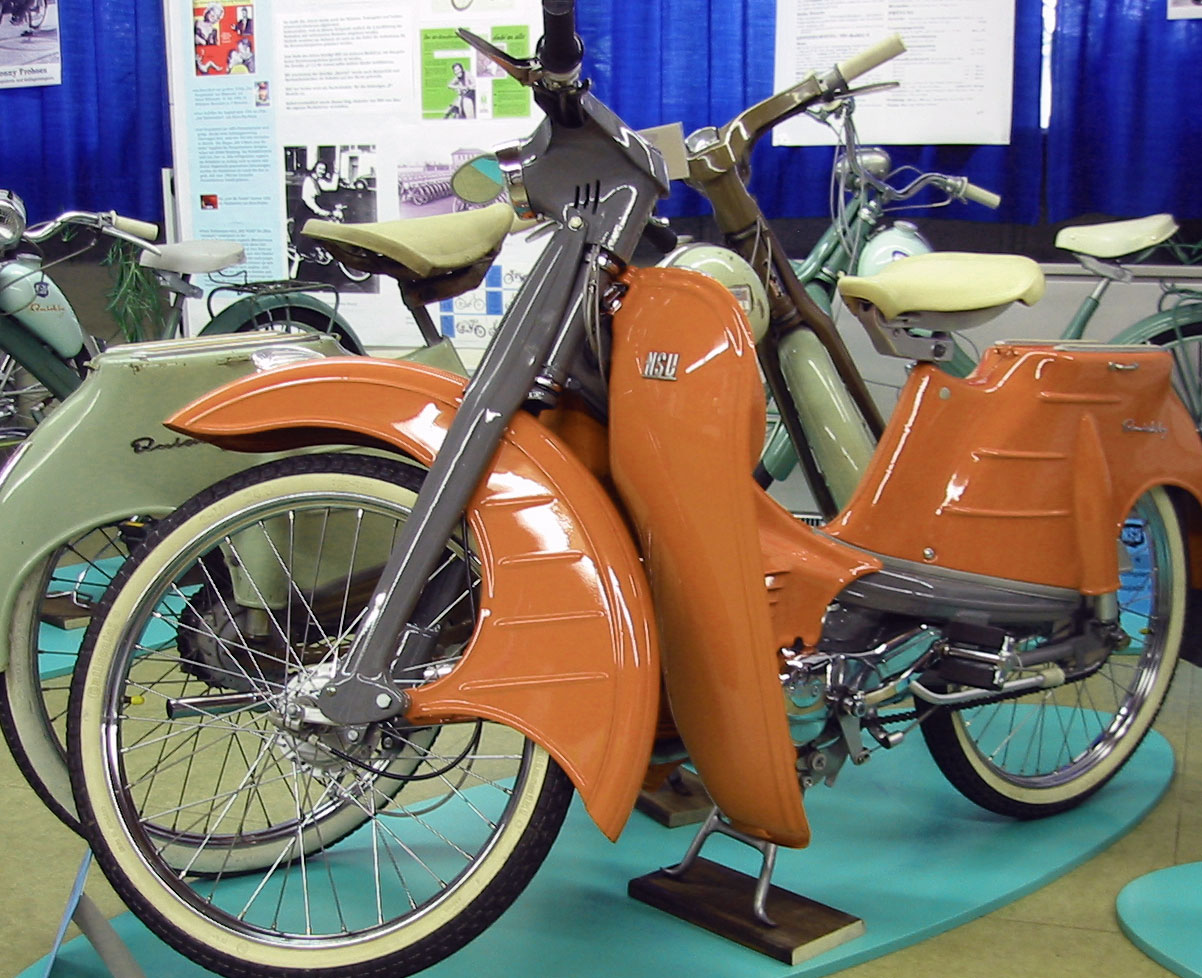
NSU Quickly L

The L was a "Luxus" (luxury) version. On the L, the regular Quickly pressed steel frame was given attachment points for a swingarm and a unit encompassing the rear fender and spring/damper units for the rear suspension. Leg shields were optional on the L. 86,380 Quickly L mopeds were manufactured from 1956 to 1961.

=== Quickly Cavallino ===
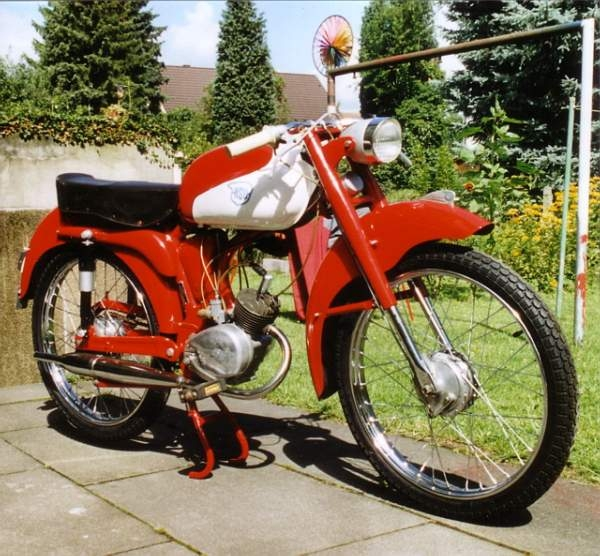
NSU Quickly Cavallino

The Quickly Cavallino used the Quickly motor unit but had a more conventional motorcycle frame and appearance. The Cavallino had telescopic front forks, a dual seat, a three-speed transmission, and 23 × 2.25" wheels. 21,584 Cavallino mopeds were manufactured from 1957 to 1960.

=== Quickly T ===
The T was called the "TraumQuickly", or "Dream Quickly". It had a unique frame, futuristic styling, a new leading link front fork with the front fender as a structural component, a three speed transmission, and a high-compression (6.8:1, 1.7 PS (1.3 kW) at 5000 rpm) version of the Quickly's motor unit. 38,605 Quickly T mopeds were manufactured from 1959 to 1963.

=== Quickly TT and TT/K ===
The TT used the frame from the Cavallino and the front suspension (including structural front fender) and high-compression motor unit from the Quickly T. The Quickly TT mopeds were manufactured from 1959 to 1963. The TT/K, a TT with a kickstarter, was available from 1960 to 1961, in which time 12,200 TT/Ks were manufactured.

=== Quickly S2 ===
The Quickly S2 was a Quickly S with a dual seat installed. It had the high-compression engine from the Quickly T and a pair of 25 x 2.25" wheels. 12,411 Quickly S2 mopeds were manufactured from 1960 to 1962.

=== Quickly S/23 and S2/23 series ===
The Quickly S and S2 models were reworked with larger fuel tanks, updated styling and 23" wheels, becoming the Quickly S/23 and S2/23 respectively. The S2/23 used the high-compression engine and three speed transmission from the T. Both models were manufactured from 1961 to 1963, in which time 28,435 S/23 mopeds and 22,322 S2/23 mopeds were manufactured.

=== Quickly N/23 ===
The Quickly N/23 replaced the N in 1962 and was manufactured until 1963. The N/23 was as basic as the N but had 23 x 2.00" wheels. 11,347 Quickly N/23 mopeds were manufactured.

=== Quickly F ===
Also known as the Quickly F/23, the Quickly F essentially replaced the L at the top of the traditional Quickly line. It was similar in styling and appearance to the S2/23, but it had rear suspension combining the swingarm from the L with the tall spring/damper units from the Cavallino and TT. The Quickly F was manufactured from 1962 to 1963.
