= NSU Sulmobil =

The NSU Sulmobil was a three-wheeled car built by Neckarsulmer Fahrzeugwerke Aktiengesellschaft (NSU) in the years 1905 to 1909.

The Sulmobil was the first car designed and constructed in-house by NSU. Three versions were produced, first with a single-cylinder and later with a two-cylinder engine.

== Technical details ==
The single-cylinder models (types II and IV) had an air-cooled engine with an upright cylinder, which produced 3.5 horsepower (2.6 kW) from a displacement of 451 cm³ (bore × stroke = 82 × 86 mm). The engine had a high-voltage Magneto ignition and was mounted with the three-speed gearbox on the single front wheel, which was propelled by a chain. The transmission was actuated by a right-hand-side slide mechanism. The wheelbase was 2000 mm, the track of the rear axle 1150 mm and the length of the vehicles about 2950 mm. The weight of the chassis was 300 kg, and the top speed 35 km / h.

The two-cylinder model (Type III) had a displacement of 795 cm³ (bore × stroke = 75 × 90 mm) and produced 5.5 hp (4.0 kW). Otherwise it was the same as the single-cylinder models.

The types II and IV were built 1905-1909, while the type III was only made in 1909. In that year, construction of the Sulmobil (which was expensive, costing RM 2500) was ceased, because of the vehicles' limited capabilities: the weight of their load, for example, was 150–200 kg.

The vehicle was a compromise between the car and the motorcycle, with a wooden luggage box 1000 × 800 × 900 mm. But there are also said to have been three-wheelers for personal transport.
