= Pipe (company) =

Belgian automobile manufacturer

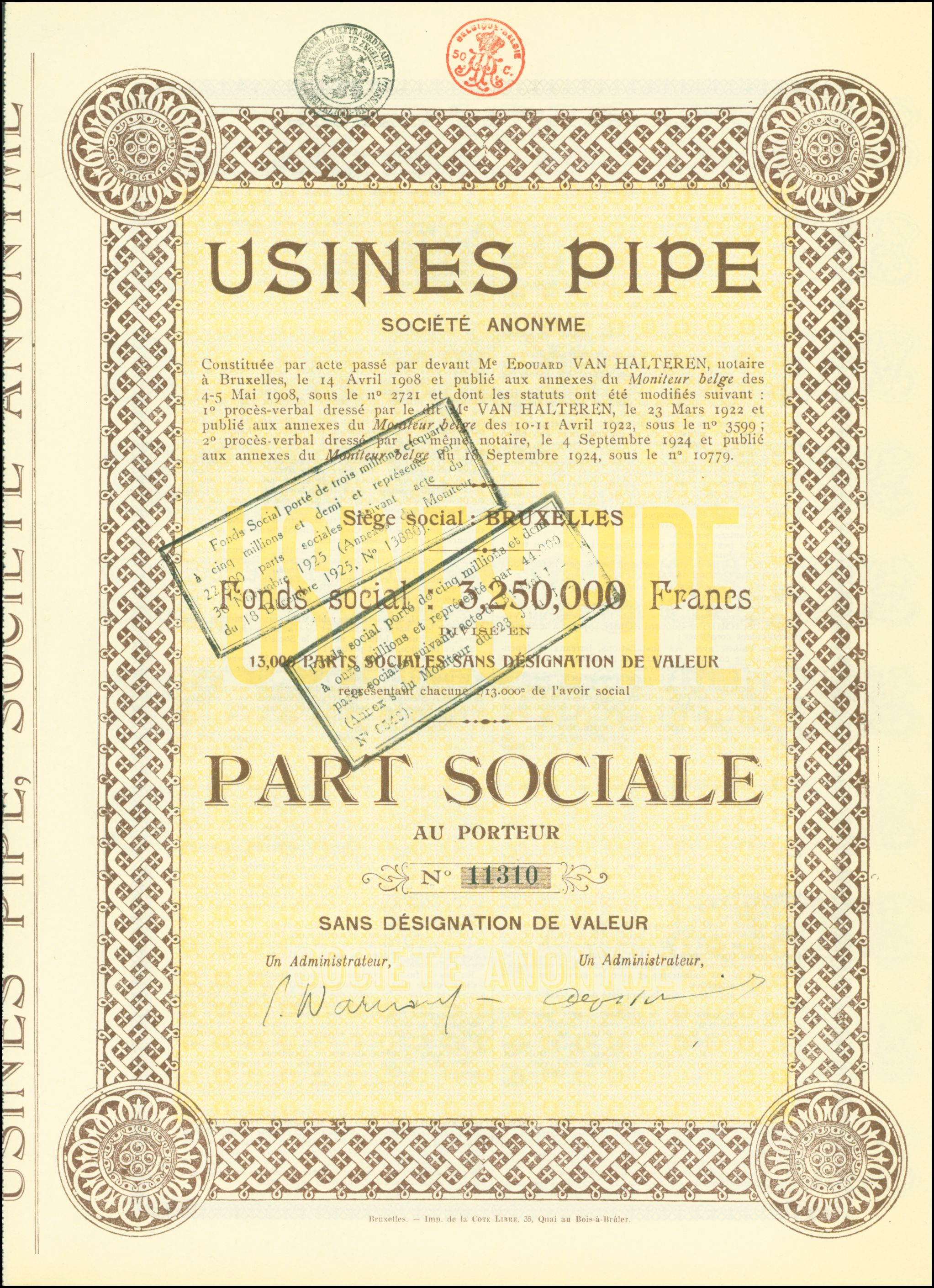
Share of the Usines Pipe SA, issued 18. September 1924

Pipe 15-20 hp (1904)

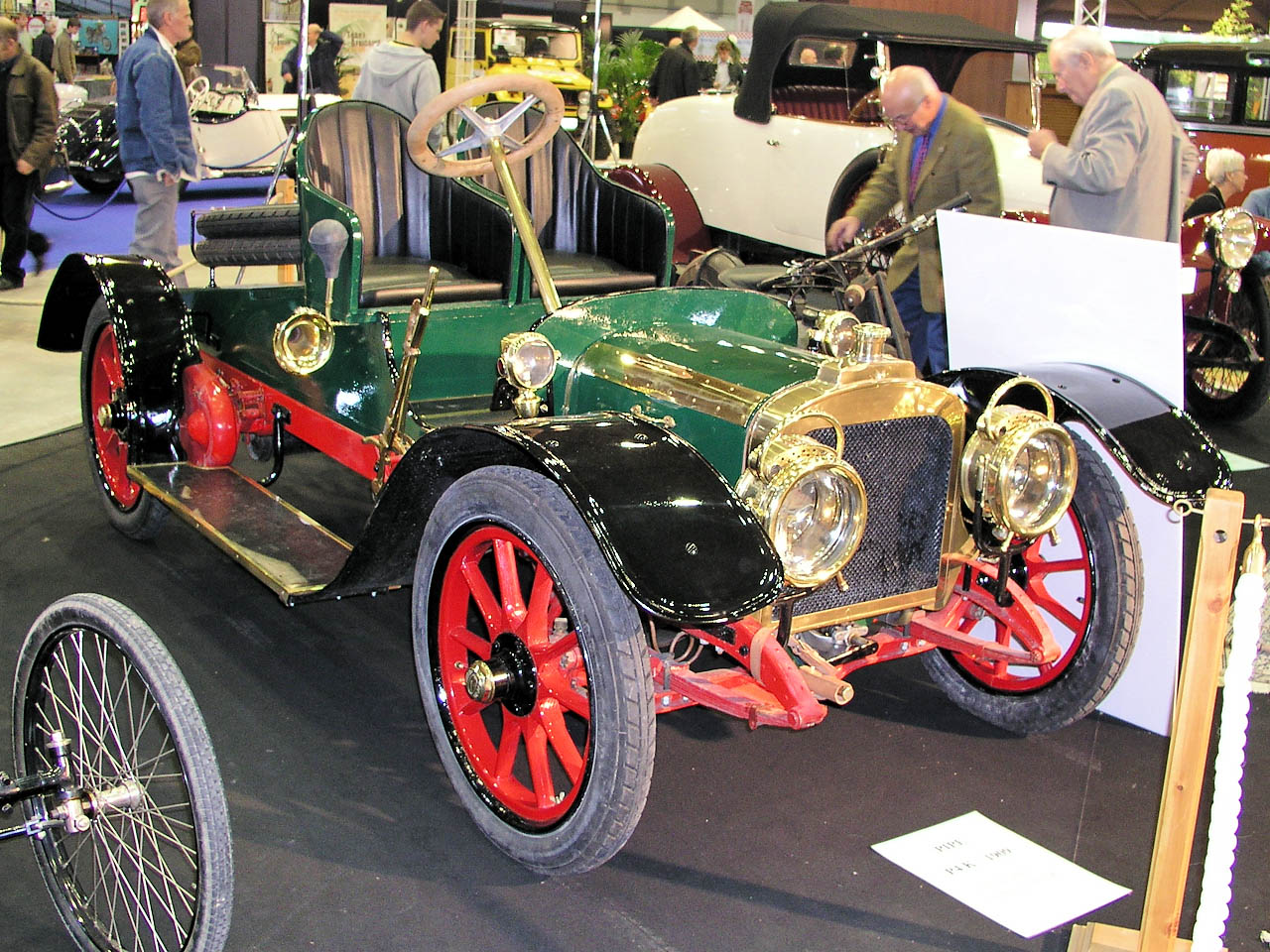
1909 Pipe P4K runabout

Pipe was a Belgian automobile manufacturer founded by the brothers Alfred and Victor Goldschmidt. The company was also known as Compagnie Belge de Construction Automobiles.

In 1900 they presented their first car in Brussels under the name Pipe. This model was similar to cars made by Panhard & Levassor. This Pipe car was powered by a two-cylinder engine.

In 1901, a sporty model was made, the Pipe 15 CV, with a four-cylinder engine. This model was a good design to use in racing, and was used in the Paris to Berlin race. Pipe also built cars with more powerful engines, such as the Pipe 90 CV from 1903, and the Pipe 60 CV from 1904. The latter model had a 13.5-litre four-cylinder engine.

In 1907, over 300 cars of the types 28, 50 and 80 CV were sold. Because of this, Pipe became one of the largest Belgian car manufacturers. Pipe cars were not only sold in Belgium, but they were exported to many different countries.

During the First World War, the factory was partly destroyed. Only in 1921 did it resume car manufacture. In that year, Pipe presented two new models, with 3.0 and 9.0 litre, but these models were presented badly. The management decided to switch to the manufacture of trucks instead. Under the Bovy-Pipe label, trucks were built and sold until 1950. But the company had already been taken over by Brossel in 1930.
