= 1960 Dutch TT =

(Netherlands) 1960 Dutch TT
Race details
- Race 3 of 7 races in the 1960 Grand Prix motorcycle racing season
- Date: 25 June 1960
- Location: Circuit van Drenthe, Assen
- Course: Permanent racing facility; 7.700 km (4.785 mi)

500cc
- Rider
Fastest lap
Rider	(Italy) Remo Venturi	MV Agusta
Time	3:19.4	
Podium
First	(Italy) Remo Venturi	MV Agusta
Second	(Australia) Bob Brown	Norton
Third	(Italy) Emilio Mendogni	MV Agusta

350cc
- Rider
Fastest lap
Rider	(United Kingdom) John Surtees	MV Agusta
Time	3:22.6	
Podium
First	(United Kingdom) John Surtees	MV Agusta
Second	(Federation of Rhodesia and Nyasaland) Gary Hocking	MV Agusta
Third	(United Kingdom) Bob Anderson	Norton

250cc
- Rider
Fastest lap
Rider	(Italy) Tarquinio Provini	Moto Morini
Time	3:21.5	
Podium
First	(Italy) Carlo Ubbiali	MV Agusta
Second	(Federation of Rhodesia and Nyasaland) Gary Hocking	MV Agusta
Third	(Switzerland) Luigi Taveri	MV Agusta

125cc
- Rider
Fastest lap
Rider	(Italy) Carlo Ubbiali	MV Agusta
Time	3:40.0	
Podium
First	(Italy) Carlo Ubbiali	MV Agusta
Second	(Federation of Rhodesia and Nyasaland) Gary Hocking	MV Agusta
Third	(Italy) Alberto Gandossi	MZ

Sidecar (B2A)
- Rider
Fastest lap
Rider	(Switzerland) Florian Camathias	BMW
Time	3:42.7	
Podium
First	(United Kingdom) Pip Harris	BMW
Second	(West Germany) Helmut Fath	BMW
Third	(Switzerland) Fritz Scheidegger	BMW

The 1960 Dutch TT was the third round of the 1960 Grand Prix motorcycle racing season. It took place on 25 June 1960 at the Circuit van Drenthe, Assen.

== 500 cc classification ==
Pos	Rider	Manufacturer	Laps	Time	Points
1	(Italy) Remo Venturi	MV Agusta	27	1:32:41.2	8
2	(Australia) Bob Brown	Norton	27	+30.5	6
3	(Italy) Emilio Mendogni	MV Agusta	27	+32.6	4
4	(South Africa) Paddy Driver	Norton	27	+1:05.0	3
5	(United Kingdom) Mike Hailwood	Norton	27	+1:31.1	2
6	(United Kingdom) Dickie Dale	Norton	27	+2:39.9	1
7	(United Kingdom) Frank Perris	Norton	27		
8	(Australia) Ron Miles	Norton	27		
9	(West Germany) Ernst Hiller	BMW	27		
10	(Japan) Fumio Ito	BMW	27		
11	(Australia) Jack Findlay	Norton	27		
12	(Netherlands) Anton Elbersen	BMW	24	+3 laps	

== 350 cc classification ==
Pos	Rider	Manufacturer	Laps	Time	Points
1	(United Kingdom) John Surtees	MV Agusta	20	1:08:43.7	8
2	(Federation of Rhodesia and Nyasaland) Gary Hocking	MV Agusta	20	+25.5	6
3	(United Kingdom) Bob Anderson	Norton	20	+2:17.8	4
4	(Australia) Bob Brown	Norton	20	+2:23.6	3
5	(South Africa) Paddy Driver	Norton	20	+2:44.6	2
6	(New Zealand) John Hempleman	Norton	20	+2:46.2	1
7	(Federation of Rhodesia and Nyasaland) Jim Redman	Norton	20		
8	(United Kingdom) Frank Perris	Norton	19	+1 lap	
9	(Australia) Ron Miles	Norton	19	+1 lap	
10	(Federation of Rhodesia and Nyasaland) Willy van Leeuwen	Norton	19	+1 lap	
11	(West Germany) Karl Hoppe	AJS	19	+1 lap	
12	(Austria) Bert Schneider	Norton	19	+1 lap	
13	(Belgium) Raymond Bogaerdt	Norton	19	+1 lap	
14	(United Kingdom) Dickie Dale	Norton	19	+1 lap	
15	(France) Jacques Insermini	Norton	19	+1 lap	
16	(Australia) Jack Findlay	Norton	19	+1 lap	
17	(Australia) Bob West	Norton	19	+1 lap	
18	(Netherlands) Joop Vogelzang	Norton	18	+2 laps	

== 250 cc classification ==
Pos	Rider	Manufacturer	Laps	Time	Points
1	(Italy) Carlo Ubbiali	MV Agusta	17	58:54.0	8
2	(Federation of Rhodesia and Nyasaland) Gary Hocking	MV Agusta	17	+30.3	6
3	(Switzerland) Luigi Taveri	MV Agusta	17	+57.1	4
4	(New Zealand) John Hempleman	MZ	17	+1:13.9	3
5	(United Kingdom) Mike Hailwood	Mondial	17	+2:54.2	2
6	(East Germany) Ernst Degner	MZ	17	+3:22.2	1
7	(Netherlands) Jan Huberts	Honda	17		
8	(Federation of Rhodesia and Nyasaland) Jim Redman	Honda	16	+1 lap	
9	(Italy) Alberto Pagani	Aermacchi	16	+1 lap	
10	(Austria) Rudi Thalhammer	NSU	16	+1 lap	
11	(West Germany) Horst Kassner	NSU	16	+1 lap	
12	(West Germany) Günter Beer	Adler	16	+1 lap	
13	(West Germany) Horst Burkhardt	NSU	15	+2 laps	
14	(West Germany) Siegfried Lohmann	Adler	15	+2 laps	
15	J. Welp	NSU	15	+2 laps	

== 125 cc classification ==
Pos	Rider	Manufacturer	Laps	Time	Points
1	(Italy) Carlo Ubbiali	MV Agusta	14	52:42.2	8
2	(Federation of Rhodesia and Nyasaland) Gary Hocking	MV Agusta	14	+3.1	6
3	(Italy) Alberto Gandossi	MZ	14	+23.7	4
4	(Federation of Rhodesia and Nyasaland) Jim Redman	Honda	14	+41.1	3
5	(East Germany) Ernst Degner	MZ	14	+1:25.0	2
6	(Japan) Giichi Suzuki	Honda	14	+2:17.1	1
7	(Italy) Alberto Pagani	MV Agusta	14		
8	(United Kingdom) Mike Hailwood	Ducati	14		
9	(Netherlands) Hans Lenheer	Ducati	12	+2 laps	
10	(Netherlands) Jaap Stoltenkamp	NSU	12	+2 laps	
19 starters, 11 finishers

== Sidecar classification ==
Pos	Rider	Passenger	Manufacturer	Laps	Time	Points
1	(United Kingdom) Pip Harris	(United Kingdom) Ray Campbell	BMW	14	53:26.2	8
2	(West Germany) Helmut Fath	(West Germany) Alfred Wohlgemuth	BMW	14	+31.0	6
3	(Switzerland) Fritz Scheidegger	(West Germany) Horst Burkhardt	BMW	14	+1:09.9	4
4	(Switzerland) Edgar Strub	(West Germany) Hilmar Cecco	BMW	14	+1:10.5	3
5	(United Kingdom) Bill Boddice	(United Kingdom) Graham Stokes	Norton	14	+1:36.1	2
6	(West Germany) Max Deubel	(West Germany) Horst Höhler	BMW	14	+1:57.6	1
7	(Switzerland) Claude Lambert	(Switzerland) Rodolphe Rüfenacht	BMW	13	+1 lap	
8	(United Kingdom) Bill Beevers	(United Kingdom) John Chisnall	BMW	13	+1 lap	
9	(West Germany) Otto Kölle	(West Germany) Dieter Hess	BMW	13	+1 lap	
10	(Socialist Federal Republic of Yugoslavia) Bošco Šnajder	(Socialist Federal Republic of Yugoslavia) Stanko Šajnovic	BMW	13	+1 lap	
11	(United Kingdom) John Tickle	(United Kingdom) Cathy Tickle	Norton	13	+1 lap	
12	(Australia) Ray Foster	(Australia) Estelle Foster	Norton	13	+1 lap	
13	(Australia) Orrie Salter	?	Norton	13	+1 lap	
14	(Netherlands) Harmen van der Wal	?	Norton	12	+2 laps	
15	L. W. Munninghof	?	Norton	12	+2 laps	
16	(Switzerland) Florian Camathias	(West Germany) Roland Föll	BMW	11	+3 laps	

Previous race: 1960 Isle of Man TT	FIM Grand Prix World Championship; 1960 season	Next race: 1960 Belgian Grand Prix
Previous race: 1959 Dutch TT	Dutch TT	Next race: 1961 Dutch TT
