= Michelle Duff =

Canadian motorcycle racer (1939–2025)

- Born: Michael Alan Duff; 13 December 1939; Toronto, Ontario, Canada
- Died: 23 July 2025 (aged 85); Liverpool, Nova Scotia, Canada
Motorcycle racing career statistics
Grand Prix motorcycle racing
Active years	1960–1967
First race	1960 Isle of Man TT
Last race	1967 500cc Canadian Grand Prix
First win	1964 250cc Belgian Grand Prix
Last win	1965 250cc Finnish Grand Prix
Team(s)	Aermacchi, AJS, Bultaco, Cotton, Matchless, MZ, Norton, Yamaha
Championships	0
Starts / Wins / Podiums / Poles / F. laps / Points; / 3 / 24 / 0 / 5 / 164 (176)

Michelle Ann Duff (born Michael Alan Duff; 13 December 1939 – 23 July 2025) was a Canadian Grand Prix motorcycle road racer.

== Riding ==
Duff's best season was in 1965, winning the 250cc Finnish Grand Prix and finishing the year in second place to Phil Read.

Duff suffered a near-fatal crash in Japan and required extensive surgery and physical therapy. The recovery was documented in the 1967 National Film Board of Canada short documentary film Ride for Your Life, directed by Robin Spry.

== Personal life and death ==
Duff married a Finnish woman in 1963 and had a son with her the same year, and a daughter two years later. In 1984, she changed her name to Michelle and commenced transition, separating from her wife. Following gender-affirming surgery, she wrote about her experiences as a professional motorcycle racer (note that this book is not about her life as a trans woman) in Make Haste, Slowly: The Mike Duff story.

Duff died in Liverpool, Nova Scotia on 23 July 2025, at the age of 85.

== World Championship results ==
**Position**	1	2	3	4	5	6
**Points**	8	6	4	3	2	1

(key) (Races in bold indicate pole position; races in italics indicate fastest lap. An empty black cell indicates that the class did not compete at that particular championship round.)

Year	Class	Motorcycle	1	2	3	4	5	6	7	8	9	10	11	12	13	Rank	Points
1960			FRA	IOM	NED	BEL	GER	ULS	NAT								
1960	500 cc	Norton		Ret												—	0
1961			ESP	GER	FRA	IOM	NED	BEL	DDR	ULS	NAT	SWE	ARG				
1961	350 cc	AJS				15				6		6				17th	2
1961	500 cc	Matchless				14		4				5				11th	5
1962			ESP	FRA	IOM	NED	BEL	GER	ULS	DDR	NAT	FIN	ARG				
1962	350 cc	AJS			5				6	5						9th	5
1962	500 cc	Matchless			Ret											—	0
1963			ESP	GER	FRA	IOM	NED	BEL	ULS	DDR	FIN	NAT	ARG	JPN			
1963	125 cc	Bultaco	6			Ret										16th	3
1963	125 cc	MZ								5						16th	3
1963	350 cc	AJS				6			4	6						10th	5
1963	500 cc	Matchless				4			6	4	3					6th	11
1964			USA	ESP	FRA	IOM	NED	BEL	GER	DDR	ULS	FIN	NAT	JPN			
1964	250 cc	Cotton				Ret										4th	20
1964	250 cc	Yamaha					5	1	3				2			4th	20
1964	350 cc	AJS				3	5		3	3	2	5	5			**3rd**	**20 (24)**
1964	500 cc	Norton	4													4th	18
1964	500 cc	Matchless				Ret				2		2	4			4th	18
1965			USA	GER	ESP	FRA	IOM	NED	BEL	DDR	CSK	ULS	FIN	NAT	JPN		
1965	125 cc	Yamaha					3	1								6th	12
1965	250 cc	Yamaha	2	2	3		2	3	3		2	2	1			**2nd**	**42 (50)**
1965	350 cc	AJS					Ret									—	0
1965	500 cc	Matchless					3									11th	4
1966			ESP	GER	FRA	NED	BEL	DDR	CSK	FIN	ULS	IOM	NAT	JPN			
1966	125 cc	Yamaha				6						4				10th	4
1966	250 cc	Yamaha					5	3	4			Ret				9th	9
1966	500 cc	Matchless										Ret				—	0
1967			ESP	GER	FRA	IOM	NED	BEL	DDR	CSK	FIN	ULS	NAT	CAN	JPN		
1967	350 cc	Aermacchi				Ret										—	0
1967	500 cc	Matchless				Ret								3		11th	4
