= 1960 Belgian motorcycle Grand Prix =

(Belgium) 1960 Belgian Grand Prix
Race details
- Race 4 of 7 races in the 1960 Grand Prix motorcycle racing season
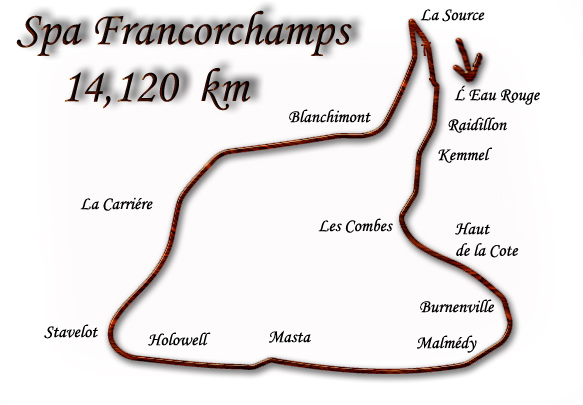
- Date: 3 July 1960
- Location: Circuit de Spa-Francorchamps
- Course: Permanent racing facility; 14.100 km (8.761 mi)

500cc
- Rider
Fastest lap
| Rider | (United Kingdom) John Surtees | MV Agusta |
| Time | 4:17.1 | |
Podium
| First | (United Kingdom) John Surtees | MV Agusta |
| Second | (Italy) Remo Venturi | MV Agusta |
| Third | (Australia) Bob Brown | Norton |

250cc
- Rider
Fastest lap
| Rider | (Italy) Carlo Ubbiali | MV Agusta |
| Time | 4:33.8 | |
Podium
| First | (Italy) Carlo Ubbiali | MV Agusta |
| Second | (Federation of Rhodesia and Nyasaland) Gary Hocking | MV Agusta |
| Third | (Switzerland) Luigi Taveri | MV Agusta |

125cc
- Rider
Fastest lap
| Rider | (New Zealand) John Hempleman (Italy) Bruno Spaggiari | MZ; MV Agusta |
| Time | 5:09.3 | |
Podium
| First | (East Germany) Ernst Degner | MZ |
| Second | (New Zealand) John Hempleman | MZ |
| Third | (Italy) Carlo Ubbiali | MV Agusta |

Sidecar (B2A)
- Rider
Fastest lap
| Rider | (Switzerland) Florian Camathias | BMW |
| Time | 5:08.5 | |
Podium
| First | (West Germany) Helmut Fath | BMW |
| Second | (Switzerland) Fritz Scheidegger | BMW |
| Third | (Switzerland) Edgar Strub | BMW |

The 1960 Belgian motorcycle Grand Prix was the fourth round of the 1960 Grand Prix motorcycle racing season. It took place on 3 July 1960 at the Circuit de Spa-Francorchamps.

== 500 cc classification ==
| Pos | Rider | Manufacturer | Laps | Time | Points |
|---|---|---|---|---|---|
| 1 | (United Kingdom) John Surtees | MV Agusta | 15 | 1:05:25.1 | 8 |
| 2 | (Italy) Remo Venturi | MV Agusta | 15 | +1:23.1 | 6 |
| 3 | (Australia) Bob Brown | Norton | 15 | +2:43.1 | 4 |
| 4 | (United Kingdom) Mike Hailwood | Norton | 15 | +2:59.4 | 3 |
| 5 | (Federation of Rhodesia and Nyasaland) Jim Redman | Norton | 15 | +3:41.3 | 2 |
| 6 | (Italy) Emilio Mendogni | MV Agusta | 15 | +3:46.6 | 1 |
| 7 | (New Zealand) John Hempleman | Norton | 15 | | |
| 8 | (United Kingdom) John Hartle | Norton | 15 | | |
| 9 | (Austria) Bert Schneider | Norton | 14 | +1 lap | |
| 10 | (Japan) Fumio Ito | BMW | 14 | +1 lap | |
| 11 | (New Zealand) Peter Pawson | Norton | 14 | +1 lap | |
| 12 | (United Kingdom) Dickie Dale | Norton | 14 | +1 lap | |
| 13 | (France) Jacques Insermini | Norton | 14 | +1 lap | |
| 14 | (Australia) Bob West | Norton | 14 | +1 lap | |
| 15 | (West Germany) Rudolf Gläser | Norton | 14 | +1 lap | |
| 16 | (West Germany) Hans-Günter Jäger | BMW | 13 | +2 laps | |
| 17 | (Belgium) Raymond Bogaerdt | Norton | 11 | +4 laps | |

== 250 cc classification ==
| Pos | Rider | Manufacturer | Laps | Time | Points |
|---|---|---|---|---|---|
| 1 | (Italy) Carlo Ubbiali | MV Agusta | 9 | 41:40.3 | 8 |
| 2 | (Federation of Rhodesia and Nyasaland) Gary Hocking | MV Agusta | 9 | +0.6 | 6 |
| 3 | (Switzerland) Luigi Taveri | MV Agusta | 9 | +30.6 | 4 |
| 4 | (United Kingdom) Mike Hailwood | Ducati | 9 | +2:02.5 | 3 |
| 5 | (Italy) Alberto Pagani | Aermacchi | 8 | +1 lap | 2 |
| 6 | (West Germany) Günter Beer | Adler | 8 | +1 lap | 1 |
| 7 | (Belgium) Pierrot Vervroegen | Motobi | 8 | +1 lap | |
| 8 | (Austria) Rudi Thalhammer | NSU | 8 | +1 lap | |
| 9 | (West Germany) Siegfried Lohmann | Adler | 8 | +1 lap | |
| 10 | (Belgium) Raphaël Orinel | NSU | 8 | +1 lap | |

== 125 cc classification ==
| Pos | Rider | Manufacturer | Laps | Time | Points |
|---|---|---|---|---|---|
| 1 | (East Germany) Ernst Degner | MZ | 8 | 42:00.1 | 8 |
| 2 | (New Zealand) John Hempleman | MZ | 8 | +5.3 | 6 |
| 3 | (Italy) Carlo Ubbiali | MV Agusta | 8 | +5.5 | 4 |
| 4 | (Italy) Bruno Spaggiari | MV Agusta | 8 | +20.6 | 3 |
| 5 | (Federation of Rhodesia and Nyasaland) Gary Hocking | MV Agusta | 8 | +1:04.3 | 2 |
| 6 | (United Kingdom) Mike Hailwood | Ducati | 8 | +1:04.7 | 1 |
| 7 | (Japan) Moto Kitano | Honda | 8 | | |
| 8 | (Japan) Sadao Shimazaki | Honda | 8 | | |
| 9 | (Federation of Rhodesia and Nyasaland) Jim Redman | Ducati | 8 | | |
| 10 | (Australia) Bob Brown | Honda | 8 | | |
| 11 | (Italy) Alberto Gandossi | MZ | 8 | | |
| 12 | (Japan) Giichi Suzuki | Honda | 8 | | |
13 starters, 12 finishers

== Sidecar classification ==
| Pos | Rider | Passenger | Manufacturer | Laps | Time | Points |
|---|---|---|---|---|---|---|
| 1 | (West Germany) Helmut Fath | (West Germany) Alfred Wohlgemuth | BMW | 8 | 41:57.1 | 8 |
| 2 | (Switzerland) Fritz Scheidegger | (West Germany) Horst Burkhardt | BMW | 8 | +22.3 | 6 |
| 3 | (Switzerland) Edgar Strub | (West Germany) Hilmar Cecco | BMW | 8 | +2:05.0 | 4 |
| 4 | (United Kingdom) Jackie Beeton | (United Kingdom) Eddie Bulgin | BMW | 8 | +2:15.2 | 3 |
| 5 | (West Germany) Alwin Ritter | (West Germany) Emil Hörner | BMW | 8 | +3:07.7 | 2 |
| 6 | (France) Jo Rogliardo | (France) Marcel Godillot | BMW | 8 | +3:35.8 | 1 |
| 7 | (Switzerland) Claude Lambert | (Switzerland) Rodolphe Rüfenacht | BMW | 8 | | |
| 8 | (United Kingdom) Bill Beevers | (United Kingdom) John Chisnall | BMW | 8 | | |
| 9 | (West Germany) Otto Kölle | (West Germany) Dieter Hess | BMW | 8 | | |
| 10 | (United Kingdom) John Tickle | (United Kingdom) Cathy Tickle | Norton | 8 | | |
| 11 | (Socialist Federal Republic of Yugoslavia) Bošco Šnajder | (Socialist Federal Republic of Yugoslavia) Stanko Šajnovic | BMW | 8 | | |
| 12 | (Australia) Ray Foster | (Australia) Estelle Foster | Norton | 8 | | |
| 13 | (France) Joseph Duhem | ? | Norton | 8 | | |
| 14 | (Australia) Orrie Salter | ? | Norton | 8 | | |
| 15 | (Switzerland) Florian Camathias | (Germany) Roland Föll | BMW | 7 | +1 lap | |
| 16 | (United Kingdom) Peter Woollett | ? | Norton | 7 | +1 lap | |
| 17 | (United Kingdom) Bill Boddice | (United Kingdom) Graham Stokes | Norton | 7 | +1 lap | |
| 18 | (West Germany) Max Deubel | (West Germany) Horst Höhler | BMW | 6 | +2 laps | |

| Previous race: 1960 Dutch TT | FIM Grand Prix World Championship; 1960 season | Next race: 1960 German Grand Prix |
| Previous race: 1959 Belgian Grand Prix | Belgian Grand Prix | Next race: 1961 Belgian Grand Prix |
