= 1960 French motorcycle Grand Prix =

(France) 1960 French Grand Prix
Race details
- Race 1 of 7 races in the 1960 Grand Prix motorcycle racing season
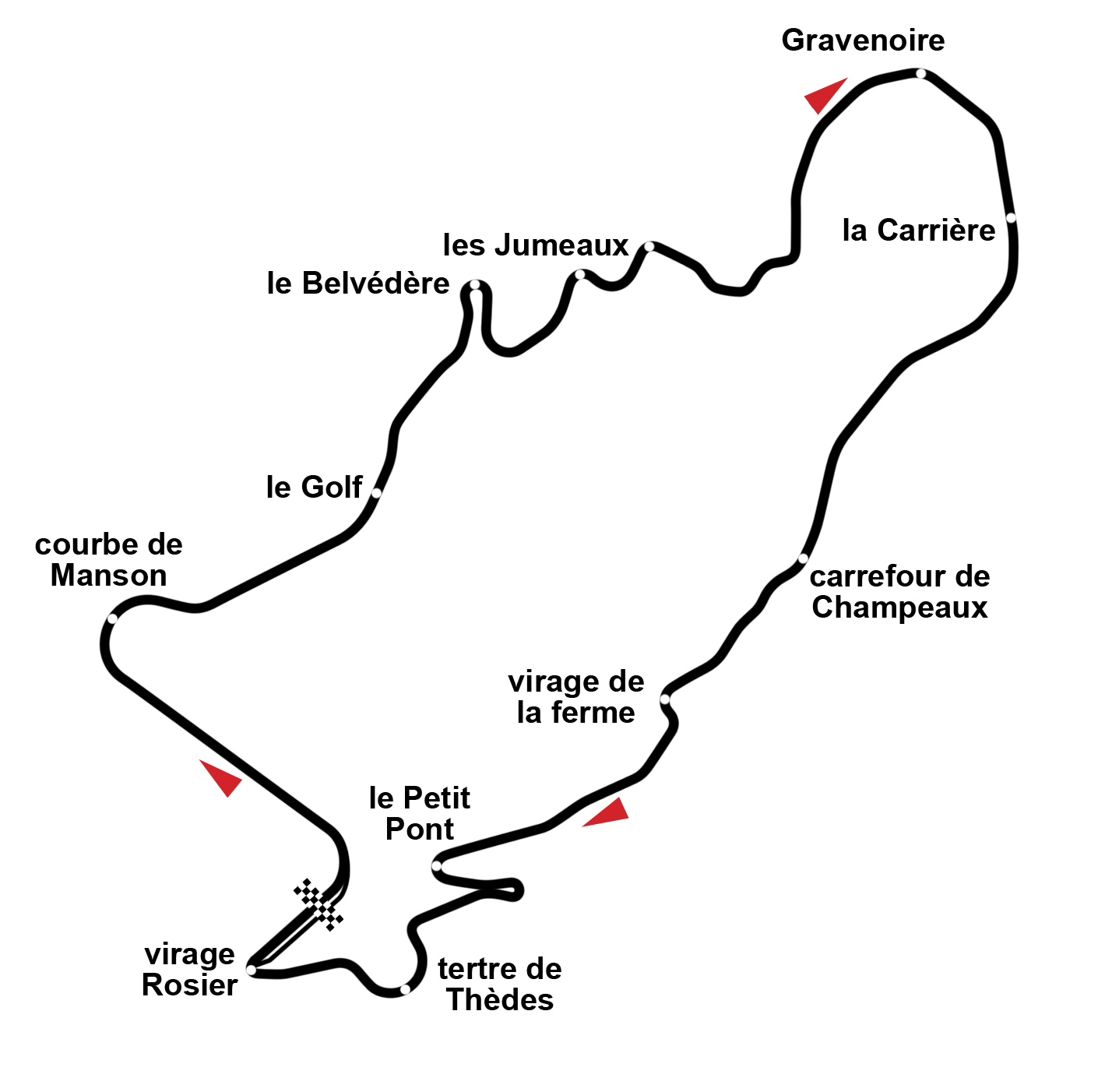
- Date: 22 May 1960
- Location: Clermont-Ferrand
- Course: Permanent racing facility; 8.055 km (5.005 mi)

500cc
- Rider
Fastest lap
Rider	(United Kingdom) John Surtees	MV Agusta
Time	3:54.7	
Podium
First	(United Kingdom) John Surtees	MV Agusta
Second	(Italy) Remo Venturi	MV Agusta
Third	(Australia) Bob Brown	Norton

350cc
- Rider
Fastest lap
Rider	(United Kingdom) John Surtees	MV Agusta
Time	3:58.7	
Podium
First	(Federation of Rhodesia and Nyasaland) Gary Hocking	MV Agusta
Second	(Czechoslovakia) František Šťastný	Jawa
Third	(United Kingdom) John Surtees	MV Agusta

Sidecar (B2A)
- Rider
Fastest lap
Rider	(Germany) Helmut Fath	BMW
Time	4:27.0	
Podium
First	(Germany) Helmut Fath	BMW
Second	(Switzerland) Fritz Scheidegger	BMW
Third	(Switzerland) Florian Camathias	BMW

The 1960 French motorcycle Grand Prix was the first round of the 1960 Grand Prix motorcycle racing season. It took place on 22 May 1960 at the Clermont-Ferrand circuit.

== 500 cc classification ==
Pos	Rider	Manufacturer	Laps	Time	Points
1	(United Kingdom) John Surtees	MV Agusta	25	1:39:21.6	8
2	(Italy) Remo Venturi	MV Agusta	25	+3:01.7	6
3	(Australia) Bob Brown	Norton	24	+1 lap	4
4	(South Africa) Paddy Driver	Norton	24	+1 lap	3
5	(Austria) Ladi Richter	Norton	24	+1 lap	2
6	(Japan) Fumio Ito	BMW	24	+1 lap	1
7	(New Zealand) Hugh Anderson	Norton	24	+1 lap	
8	(Australia) Bob West	Norton	24	+1 lap	
9	(New Zealand) John Hempleman	Norton	24	+1 lap	
10	(France) Jacques Insermini	Norton	24	+1 lap	
11	(Germany) Hans-Günter Jäger	BMW	23	+2 laps	
12	(South Africa) Jannie Stander	Norton	23	+2 laps	
13	(Germany) Lothar John	BMW	22	+3 laps	
14	(France) Jean-Pierre Bayle	Norton	22	+3 laps	
15	(Germany) Fritz Kläger	Horex	21	+4 laps	
16	(France) Antoine Paba	Norton	20	+5 laps	

== 350 cc classification ==
Pos	Rider	Manufacturer	Laps	Time	Points
1	(Federation of Rhodesia and Nyasaland) Gary Hocking	MV Agusta	19	1:20:46.7	8
2	(Czechoslovakia) František Šťastný	Jawa	19	+34.3	6
3	(United Kingdom) John Surtees	MV Agusta	19	+53.9	4
4	(Australia) Bob Brown	Norton	19	+1:35.9	3
5	(South Africa) Paddy Driver	Norton	19	+1:39.3	2
6	(United Kingdom) Frank Perris	Norton	19	+3:18.6	1
7	(New Zealand) John Hempleman	Norton	19		
8	(Austria) Rudi Thalhammer	Norton	19		
9	(Federation of Rhodesia and Nyasaland) Willy van Leeuwen	Norton	18	+1 lap	
10	(Australia) Bob West	Norton	18	+1 lap	
11	(France) Jacques Insermini	Norton	18	+1 lap	
12	(Federation of Rhodesia and Nyasaland) Shaun Robinson	Norton	18	+1 lap	
13	G. Smith	Norton	18	+1 lap	
14	(France) Jean-Pierre Bayle	Norton	17	+2 laps	
15	(France) Philippe Marsaux	Norton	17	+2 laps	
16	C. Packer	AJS	17	+2 laps	
17	Bouillard	Norton	16	+3 laps	
18	(Germany) Fritz Kläger	Horex	16	+3 laps	
19	F. Schneider	Norton	15	+4 laps	

== Sidecar classification ==
Pos	Rider	Passenger	Manufacturer	Laps	Time	Points
1	(Germany) Helmut Fath	(Germany) Alfred Wohlgemuth	BMW	13	58:39.6	8
2	(Switzerland) Fritz Scheidegger	(Germany) Horst Burkhardt	BMW	13	+56.8	6
3	(Switzerland) Florian Camathias	(United Kingdom) John Chisnall	BMW	13	+1:03.4	4
4	(Germany) Max Deubel	(Germany) Horst Höhler	BMW	13	+1:43.5	3
5	(Switzerland) Edgar Strub	(Germany) Hilmar Cecco	BMW	13	+4:15.8	2
6	(France) Jo Rogliardo	(France) Marcel Godillot	BMW	13	+4:40.7	1
7	(Germany) Alwin Ritter	(Germany) Emil Hörner	BMW	13		
8	(Germany) August Rohsiepe	?	BMW	13		
9	(Germany) Arsenius Butscher	(Germany) Alfred Schmidt	BMW	12	+1 lap	
10	(Switzerland) Claude Lambert	(Switzerland) Rodolphe Rüfenacht	BMW	12	+1 lap	
11	(United Kingdom) Jackie Beeton	(United Kingdom) Eddie Bulgin	BMW	12	+1 lap	
12	(Germany) Otto Kölle	(Germany) Dieter Hess	BMW	12	+1 lap	
13	(United Kingdom) Bill Beevers	?	BMW	12	+1 lap	
14	(Australia) Ray Foster	(Australia) Estelle Foster	Norton	12	+1 lap	
15	(United Kingdom) Pip Harris	(United Kingdom) Ray Campbell	BMW	11	+2 laps	
16	(United Kingdom) John Tickle	(United Kingdom) Cathy Tickle	Norton	11	+2 laps	
17	(France) Maurice Lazard	?	Norton	10	+3 laps	
18	Sauzerau	?	Norton	10	+3 laps	
19	Weiermuller	?	BMW	10	+3 laps	
20	(France) Marcel Beauvais	?	Norton	8	+5 laps	
21	(France) François Moulin	?	Norton	7	+6 laps	

Previous race: 1959 Nations Grand Prix	FIM Grand Prix World Championship; 1960 season	Next race: 1960 Isle of Man TT
Previous race: 1959 French Grand Prix	French Grand Prix	Next race: 1961 French Grand Prix
