= Remo Venturi =

Italian motorcycle racer

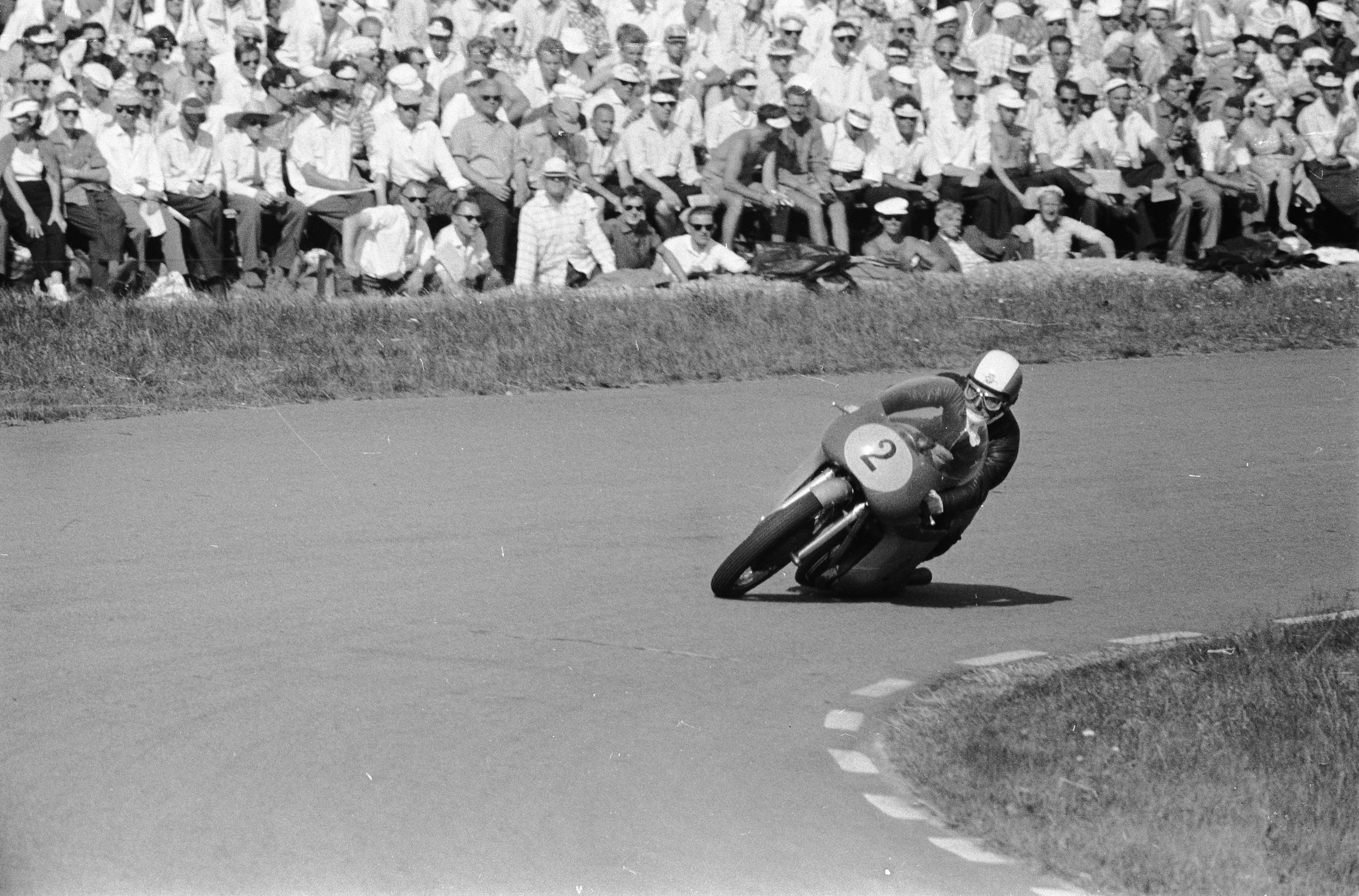
- Venturi competing in the 1960 500cc Dutch TT.
- Nationality: Italian
Motorcycle racing career statistics
Grand Prix motorcycle racing
Active years	1955 - 1960, 1962 - 1965
First race	1955 125cc West German Grand Prix
Last race	1965 250cc Nations Grand Prix
First win	1960 500cc Dutch TT
Last win	1960 500cc Dutch TT
Team(s)	MV Agusta, Bianchi, Benelli
Starts / Wins / Podiums / Poles / F. laps / Points; 24 / 1 / 22 / 0 / 3 / 122

Remo Venturi (born 21 April 1927, in Spoleto) is a former Italian Grand Prix motorcycle road racer. His best years were in 1959 and 1960 when he finished second in the 500cc world championship to his MV Agusta teammate, John Surtees.

== Motorcycle Grand Prix results ==
Position	1	2	3	4	5	6
Points	8	6	4	3	2	1

(key) (Races in italics indicate fastest lap)

Year	Class	Team	1	2	3	4	5	6	7	8	9	10	11	12	13	Points	Rank	Wins
1955	125cc	MV Agusta	ESP -	FRA -	IOM -	GER; 3	NED; 2	NAT; 2								16	3rd	0
1956	250cc	MV Agusta	IOM -	NED -	BEL -	GER; 3	ULS -	NAT; 3								8	6th	0
1957	125cc	MV Agusta	GER -	IOM -	NED -	BEL -	ULS; 3	NAT; 5								6	7th	0
1957	250cc	MV Agusta	GER -	IOM -	NED -	BEL -	ULS -	NAT; 2								6	10th	0
1958	500cc	MV Agusta	IOM -	NED -	BEL -	GER -	SWE -	ULS -	NAT; 2							6	9th	0
1959	350cc	MV Agusta	FRA -	IOM -	GER -	NED -	BEL -	SWE -	ULS -	NAT; 2						6	6th	0
1959	500cc	MV Agusta	FRA; 2	IOM -	GER; 2	NED; 3	BEL; 5		ULS -	NAT; 2						22	2nd	0
1960	500cc	MV Agusta	FRA; 2	IOM -	NED; 1	BEL; 2	GER; 2	ULS -	NAT -							26	2nd	1
1962	500cc	MV Agusta	IOM -	NED -	BEL -	ULS -	DDR -	NAT; 2	FIN -	ARG -						6	10th	0
1963	350cc	Bianchi	GER; 2	IOM -	NED -		ULS -	DDR -	FIN -	NAT -						6	6th	0
1964	350cc	Bianchi		IOM -	NED; 3		GER -	DDR -	ULS -	FIN -	NAT -	JPN -				46	8th	0
1964	500cc	Bianchi	USA -	IOM -	NED; 2	BEL -	GER -	DDR -	ULS -	FIN -	NAT -					6	8th	0
1965	250cc	Benelli	USA -	GER -	ESP -	FRA -	IOM -	NED -	BEL -	DDR -	CZE -	ULS -	FIN -	NAT; 3	JPN -	4	16th	0
