= 1960 German motorcycle Grand Prix =

(West Germany) 1960 German Grand Prix
Race details
- Race 5 of 7 races in the 1960 Grand Prix motorcycle racing season
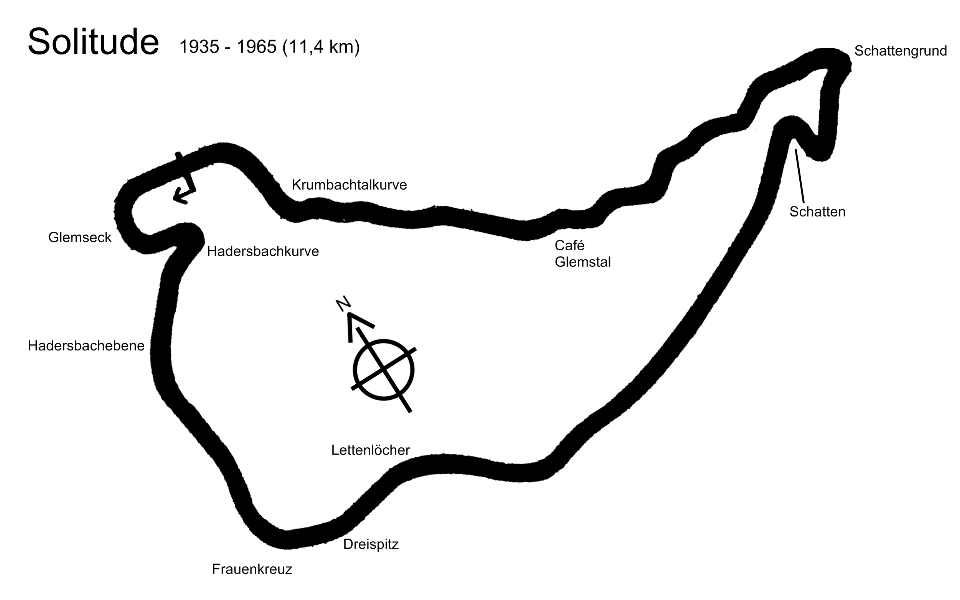
- Date: 23–24 July 1960
- Location: Solitude
- Course: Permanent racing facility; 11.409 km (7.089 mi)

500cc
- Rider
Fastest lap
Rider	(United Kingdom) John Surtees	MV Agusta
Time	4:30.9	
Podium
First	(United Kingdom) John Surtees	MV Agusta
Second	(Italy) Remo Venturi	MV Agusta
Third	(Italy) Emilio Mendogni	MV Agusta

250cc
- Rider
Fastest lap
Rider	(Federation of Rhodesia and Nyasaland) Gary Hocking	MV Agusta
Time	4:29.8	
Podium
First	(Federation of Rhodesia and Nyasaland) Gary Hocking	MV Agusta
Second	(Italy) Carlo Ubbialia	MV Agusta
Third	(Japan) Kenjirō Tanaka	Honda

Sidecar (B2A)
- Rider
Fastest lap
Rider	(West Germany) Helmut Fath	BMW
Time	5:10.5	
Podium
First	(West Germany) Helmut Fath	BMW
Second	(Switzerland) Florian Camathias	BMW
Third	(Switzerland) Fritz Scheidegger	BMW

The 1960 German motorcycle Grand Prix was the fifth round of the 1960 Grand Prix motorcycle racing season. It took place on 23–24 July 1960 at the Solitude circuit.

== 500 cc classification ==
Pos	Rider	Manufacturer	Laps	Time	Points
1	(United Kingdom) John Surtees	MV Agusta	18	1:22:32.1	8
2	(Italy) Remo Venturi	MV Agusta	18	+18.7	6
3	(Italy) Emilio Mendogni	MV Agusta	18	+1:35.1	4
4	(United Kingdom) Dickie Dale	Norton	18	+2:45.5	3
5	(New Zealand) John Hempleman	Norton	18	+2:56.2	2
6	(West Germany) Rudolf Gläser	Norton	18	+3:29.9	1
7	(South Africa) Paddy Driver	Norton	18		
8	(West Germany) Hans-Günter Jäger	BMW	18		
9	(Austria) Bert Schneider	Norton	18		
10	(France) Jacques Insermini	Norton	17	+1 lap	
11	(Germany) Alois Huber	BMW	17	+1 lap	
12	(Australia) Jack Findlay	Norton	17	+1 lap	
13	(United States) Allen Krupa	Norton	17	+1 lap	
14	(Belgium) Raymond Bogaerdt	Norton	17	+1 lap	
15	(Belgium) Raymond Hanset	Norton	17	+1 lap	

== 250 cc classification ==
Pos	Rider	Manufacturer	Laps	Time	Points
1	(Federation of Rhodesia and Nyasaland) Gary Hocking	MV Agusta	13	1:01:07.0	8
2	(Italy) Carlo Ubbiali	MV Agusta	13	+30.4	6
3	(Japan) Kenjirō Tanaka	Honda	13	+50.7	4
4	(United Kingdom) Dickie Dale	MZ	13	+51.8	3
5	(Switzerland) Luigi Taveri	MV Agusta	14	+1:06.5	2
6	(Japan) Kunimitsu Takahashi	Honda	14	+2:37.6	1
7	(Japan) Yukio Satō	Honda	14		
8	(West Germany) Heiner Butz	NSU	14		
9	(West Germany) Günter Beer	Adler	13	+1 lap	
10	(United Kingdom) Jack Murgatroyd	NSU	13	+1 lap	
11	(West Germany) Michael Schneider	NSU	13	+1 lap	
12	(West Germany) Walter Reichert	NSU	13	+1 lap	
13	(West Germany) Xaver Heiss	NSU	13	+1 lap	
14	(West Germany) Fritz Kläger	NSU	13	+1 lap	
15	(West Germany) Martin Sicheneder	Adler	13	+1 lap	

== Sidecar classification ==
Pos	Rider	Passenger	Manufacturer	Laps	Time	Points
1	(West Germany) Helmut Fath	(West Germany) Alfred Wohlgemuth	BMW	9	47:40.4	8
2	(Switzerland) Florian Camathias	(Switzerland) Gottfried Rüfenacht	BMW	9	+8.6	6
3	(Switzerland) Fritz Scheidegger	(West Germany) Horst Burkhardt	BMW	9	+52.1	4
4	(West Germany) Max Deubel	(West Germany) Horst Höhler	BMW	9	+1:10.8	3
5	(West Germany) Otto Kölle	(West Germany) Dieter Hess	BMW	9	+4:13.8	2
6	(West Germany) Alwin Ritter	(West Germany) Emil Hörner	BMW	9	+4:15.1	1
7	(West Germany) Arsenius Butscher	(West Germany) Alfred Schmidt	BMW	9		
8	(Australia) Ray Foster	(Australia) Estelle Foster	Norton	8	+1 lap	
9	(West Germany) August Rohsiepe	?	BMW	8	+1 lap	
10	(United Kingdom) Bill Beevers	(United Kingdom) John Chisnall	BMW	8	+1 lap	

Previous race: 1960 Belgian Grand Prix	FIM Grand Prix World Championship; 1960 season	Next race: 1960 Ulster Grand Prix
Previous race: 1959 German Grand Prix	German Grand Prix	Next race: 1961 German Grand Prix
