= 1960 Nations motorcycle Grand Prix =

(Italy) 1960 Nations Grand Prix
Race details
- Race 7 of 7 races in the 1960 Grand Prix motorcycle racing season
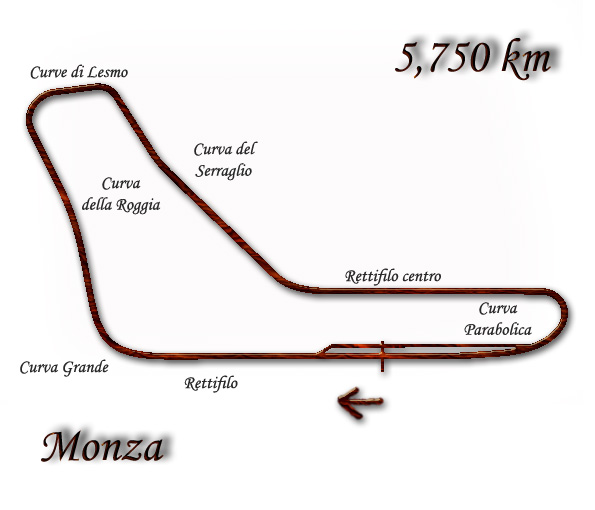
- Date: September 11 1960
- Location: Autodromo Nazionale Monza
- Course: Permanent racing facility; 5.75 km (3.57 mi)

500cc
- Rider
Fastest lap
Rider	(United Kingdom) John Surtees	MV Agusta
Time	1:48.7	
Podium
First	(United Kingdom) John Surtees	MV Agusta
Second	(Italy) Emilio Mendogni	MV Agusta
Third	(United Kingdom) Mike Hailwood	Norton

350cc
- Rider
Fastest lap
Rider	(Federation of Rhodesia and Nyasaland) Gary Hocking	MV Agusta
Time	1:55.2	
Podium
First	(Federation of Rhodesia and Nyasaland) Gary Hocking	MV Agusta
Second	(Czechoslovakia) František Šťastný	Jawa
Third	(United Kingdom) John Hartle	Norton

250cc
- Rider
Fastest lap
Rider	(Italy) Carlo Ubbiali	MV Agusta
Time	1:56.1	
Podium
First	(Italy) Carlo Ubbiali	MV Agusta
Second	(Federation of Rhodesia and Nyasaland) Jim Redman	Honda
Third	(East Germany) Ernst Degner	MZ

125cc
- Rider
Fastest lap
Rider	(Italy) Bruno Spaggiari	MV Agusta
Time	2:09.3	
Podium
First	(Italy) Carlo Ubbiali	MV Agusta
Second	(Italy) Bruno Spaggiari	MV Agusta
Third	(East Germany) Ernst Degner	MZ

The 1960 Nations motorcycle Grand Prix was the seventh and final round of the 1960 Grand Prix motorcycle racing season. It took place on September 11, 1960, at the Autodromo Nazionale Monza.

== 500 cc classification ==
Pos	Rider	Manufacturer	Laps	Time	Points
1	(United Kingdom) John Surtees	MV Agusta	35	1:05:14.0	8
2	(Italy) Emilio Mendogni	MV Agusta	35	+1:16.7	6
3	(United Kingdom) Mike Hailwood	Norton	34	+1 lap	4
4	(South Africa) Paddy Driver	Norton	34	+1 lap	3
5	(United Kingdom) John Hartle	Norton	34	+1 lap	2
6	(Federation of Rhodesia and Nyasaland) Jim Redman	Norton	33	+2 laps	1
7	(New Zealand) Hugh Anderson	Norton	33	+2 laps	
8	(Australia) Jack Findlay	Norton	33	+2 laps	
9	(United Kingdom) Dickie Dale	Norton	32	+3 laps	
10	(France) Jacques Insermini	Norton	32	+3 laps	
11	(Germany) Lothar John	BMW	32	+3 laps	
12	H. Kauert	Matchless	32	+3 laps	
13	V. Loro	Norton	30	+5 laps	

== 350 cc classification ==
Pos	Rider	Manufacturer	Laps	Time	Points
1	(Federation of Rhodesia and Nyasaland) Gary Hocking	MV Agusta	27	52:45.0	8
2	(Czechoslovakia) František Šťastný	Jawa	27	+28.1	6
3	(United Kingdom) John Hartle	Norton	27	+1:30.1	4
4	(United Kingdom) Dickie Dale	Norton	26	+1 lap	3
5	(United Kingdom) Bob Anderson	Norton	26	+1 lap	2
6	(New Zealand) Hugh Anderson	AJS	26	+1 lap	1
7	(Austria) Rudi Thalhammer	Norton	26	+1 lap	
8	(South Africa) Paddy Driver	Norton	26	+1 lap	
9	(Germany) Hans Pesl	Norton	26	+1 lap	
10	(Italy) Alfredo Milani	Norton	25	+2 laps	
11	(France) Jacques Insermini	Norton	25	+2 laps	
12	O. Perfetti	Bianchi	25	+2 laps	
13	H. Kauert	AJS	25	+2 laps	
14	R. Glaser	Norton	24	+3 laps	

== 250 cc classification ==
Pos	Rider	Manufacturer	Laps	Time	Points
1	(Italy) Carlo Ubbiali	MV Agusta	22	43:14.8	8
2	(Federation of Rhodesia and Nyasaland) Jim Redman	Honda	22	+40.4	6
3	(East Germany) Ernst Degner	MZ	22	+41.2	4
4	(Japan) Kunimitsu Takahashi	Honda	22	+42.2	3
5	(Italy) Gilberto Milani	Honda	22	+1:16.8	2
6	(Japan) Yukio Sato	Honda	22	+1:39.1	1
7	(Italy) Alberto Pagani	Ducati	22		
8	(Czechoslovakia) František Šťastný	Jawa	21	+1 lap	
9	(Germany) Horst Kassner	NSU	20	+2 laps	
10	(United Kingdom) John Dixon	Adler	20	+2 laps	
11	(Italy) Alberto Gandossi	MZ	19	+3 laps	
12	A. Schneider	NSU	19	+3 laps	
13	X. Heiss	NSU	19	+3 laps	
14	S. Lohmann	Adler	19	+3 laps	
15	G. Marchesani	CM	18	+4 laps	

== 125cc classification ==
Pos	Rider	Manufacturer	Laps	Time	Points
1	(Italy) Carlo Ubbiali	MV Agusta	18	39:28.1	8
2	(Italy) Bruno Spaggiari	MV Agusta	18	+0.2	6
3	(East Germany) Ernst Degner	MZ	18	+0.4	4
4	(Federation of Rhodesia and Nyasaland) Jim Redman	Honda	18	+36.9	3
5	(Federation of Rhodesia and Nyasaland) Gary Hocking	MV Agusta	18	+37.0	2
6	(Japan) Kunimitsu Takahashi	Honda	18	+1:24.3	1
7	(Japan) Yukio Sato	Honda	18		
8	(East Germany) Werner Musiol	MZ	18		
9	(United Kingdom) Rex Avery	EMC	18		
10	(Italy) Franco Farné	Ducati	17	+1 lap	
11	G. Marchesani	Mondial	16	+2 laps	
12	S. Brabetz	Ducati	16	+2 laps	
13	G. Mandolini	Ducati	16	+2 laps	
14	U. Svensson	Ducati	16	+2 laps	
15	A. Zucchi	Ducati	16	+2 laps	
16	R. Patrignani	Ducati	16	+2 laps	
17	A. de Simone	Ducati	16	+2 laps	
18	M. Schneider	Rumi	15	+3 laps	
30 starters, 18 finishers

Previous race: 1960 Ulster Grand Prix	FIM Grand Prix World Championship; 1960 season	Next race: 1961 Spanish Grand Prix
Previous race: 1959 Nations Grand Prix	Nations Grand Prix	Next race: 1961 Nations Grand Prix
