= František Šťastný =

Czech motorcycle racer

- Nationality: Czech
- Born: 12 November 1927; Kochánky, Czechoslovakia
- Died: 8 April 2000 (aged 72); Prague, Czech Republic
Motorcycle racing career statistics
Grand Prix motorcycle racing
Active years	1957–1969
First race	1957 250cc Isle of Man Lightweight TT
Last race	1969 350cc Yugoslavian Grand Prix
First win	1961 350cc German Grand Prix
Last win	1966 500cc East German Grand Prix
Team	Jawa
Starts / Wins / Podiums / Poles / F. laps / Points; 51 / 4 / 21 / 0 / 1 / 183

František Šťastný (12 November 1927 – 8 April 2000) was a Czech Grand Prix motorcycle road racer.

Šťastný started his sports career as bicycle racer. In 1948, he competed in the Peace Race. He competed in his first motorcycle race in 1947 on a DKW motorcycle. In 1952, he competed in the Czechoslovak Grand Prix with a used Norton motorcycle, finishing seventh. In 1953, he became a member of the Jawa factory racing team. He was the Czechoslovak motorcycle champion five times (500cc in 1956, 350cc in 1958, 350cc in 1959, 250 cc in 1960, 350 cc in 1965). He won Czechoslovak Grand Prix eight times (1954 250 cc, 1956 350 cc, 1958 350 cc, 1959 350 cc, 1960 250 cc and 350 cc, 1961 350 cc, 1962 500 cc).

In 1957, Šťastný competed in his first Grand Prix world championship race. His most successful season was 1961 in the 350cc class – he participated in five races and won twice (German Grand Prix and Swedish Grand Prix), gaining third place twice and finishing the season with 26 points, second overall behind Gary Hocking. He was also multi-time competitor in the Isle of Man TT, with best results in 1962 and 1963 in 350cc class.

After end of active sport career, Šťastný was a sportscaster for Czechoslovak Television.

== Motorcycle Grand Prix results ==
Points system from 1950 to 1968:

Position	1	2	3	4	5	6
Points	8	6	4	3	2	1

Points system from 1969 onwards:

Position	1	2	3	4	5	6	7	8	9	10
Points	15	12	10	8	6	5	4	3	2	1

(key) (Races in italics indicate fastest lap)

Year	Class	Team	1	2	3	4	5	6	7	8	9	10	11	12	13	Points	Rank	Wins
1957	250cc	Jawa	GER -	IOM; 12	NED; 5	BEL -	ULS -	NAT -								2	16th	0
1960	350cc	Jawa	FRA; 2	IOM -	NED -	ULS -	NAT; 2									12	4th	0
1961	250cc	Jawa	ESP -	GER -	FRA -	IOM -	NED; 5	BEL -	DDR -	ULS -	NAT; 5	SWE; 5	ARG -			6	10th	0
1961	350cc	Jawa		GER; 1		IOM; 5	NED; 3		DDR -	ULS; 3	NAT -	SWE; 1				26	2nd	2
1962	350cc	Jawa	IOM; 3	NED; 4		ULS; 2	DDR -	NAT; 4	FIN -							16	4th	0
1962	500cc	Jawa	IOM -	NED -	BEL -	ULS -	DDR; 4	NAT -	FIN; 3	ARG -						7	7th	0
1963	350cc	Jawa	GER -	IOM; 3	NED; 4		ULS -	DDR -	FIN -	NAT -						7	4th	0
1963	500cc	Jawa		IOM; NC	NED -	BEL -	ULS -	DDR -	FIN -	NAT -	ARG -					0	–	0
1964	350cc	Jawa	IOM; NC	NED -	GER -	DDR -	ULS -	FIN -	NAT -	JPN -						0	–	0
1965	250cc	Jawa	USA -	GER -	ESP -	FRA -	IOM; 5	NED -	BEL -	DDR; 4	CZE; 6	ULS -	FIN -	NAT; 5	JPN -	8	11th	0
1965	350cc	Jawa		GER -			IOM; NC	NED -		DDR; 4	CZE -	ULS; 1	FIN -	NAT; 4	JPN -	14	5th	1
1965	500cc	Jawa	USA -	GER -			IOM -	NED -	BEL -	DDR -	CZE; 6	ULS -	FIN -	NAT; 3		5	10th	0
1966	250cc	Jawa	ESP -	GER; 5	FRA -	NED -	BEL -	DDR; 6	CZE; 6	FIN; 3	ULS -	IOM; 4	NAT -	JPN -		11	8th	0
1966	350cc	Jawa		GER -	FRA -	NED; 6		DDR; 2	CZE; 4	FIN; 6	ULS -	IOM; 9	NAT; 5	JPN -		13	4th	0
1966	500cc	Jawa		GER -		NED; 3	BEL -	DDR; 1	CZE -	FIN -	ULS; 3	IOM; 6	NAT -			17	4th	1
1968	350cc	Jawa	GER -	IOM -	NED -	DDR -	CZE; 3	ULS; 4	NAT; 6							8	7th	0
1969	250cc	Jawa	ESP -	GER; 10	FRA -	IOM; 8	NED -	BEL -	DDR -	CZE -	FIN -	ULS; 10	NAT -	YUG -		5	32nd	0
1969	350cc	Jawa	ESP -	GER; 3		IOM; NC	NED -		DDR -	CZE -	FIN -	ULS; 5	NAT -	YUG; 3		26	9th	0
