= 1960 Grand Prix motorcycle racing season =

Sports season

1960 F.I.M. Grand Prix motorcycle racing season

Seasons
- ← 1959 1961 →

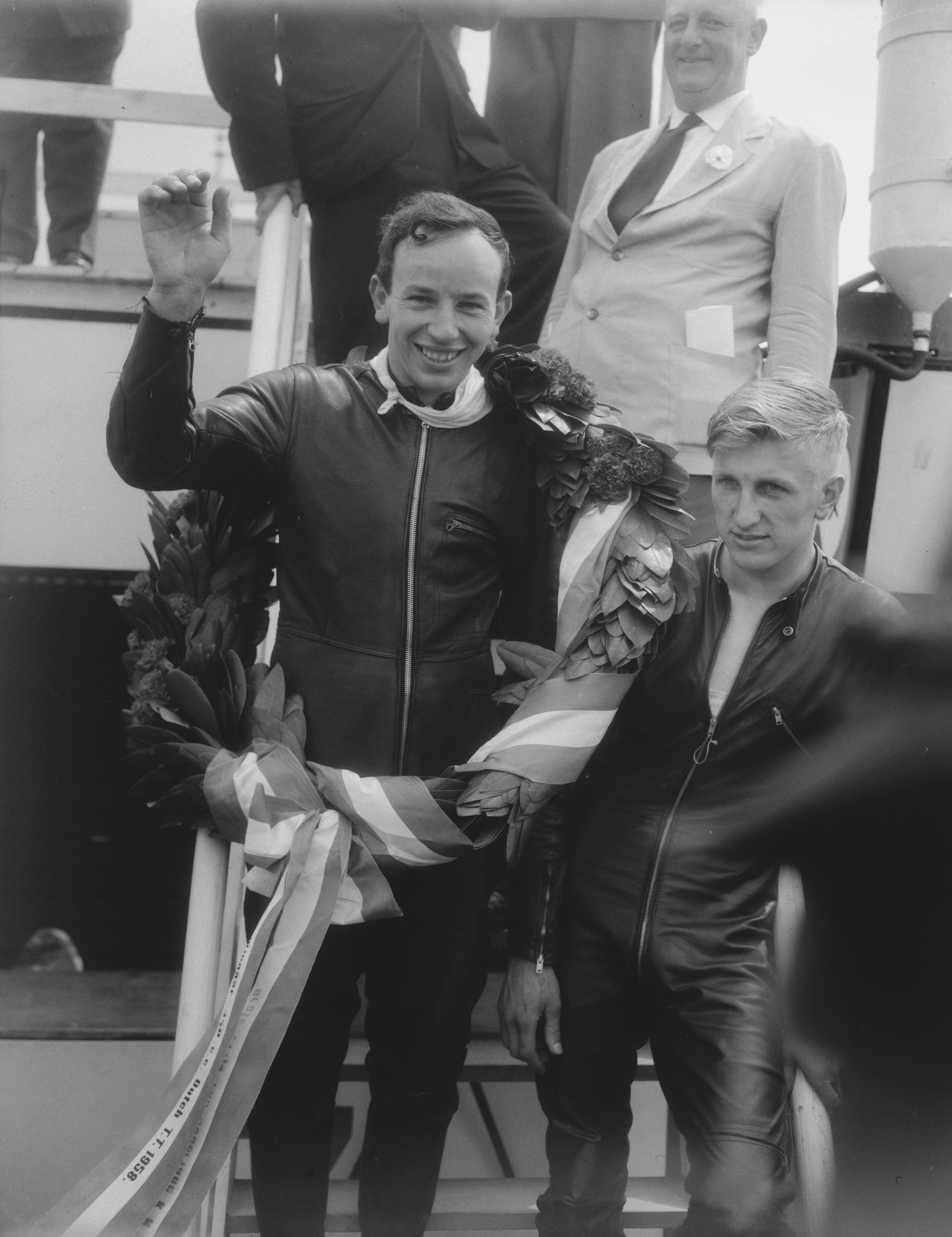
John Surtees (pictured in 1958) retained his 350cc and 500cc World Championship title, his final titles in motorcycle racing before moving to Formula One.

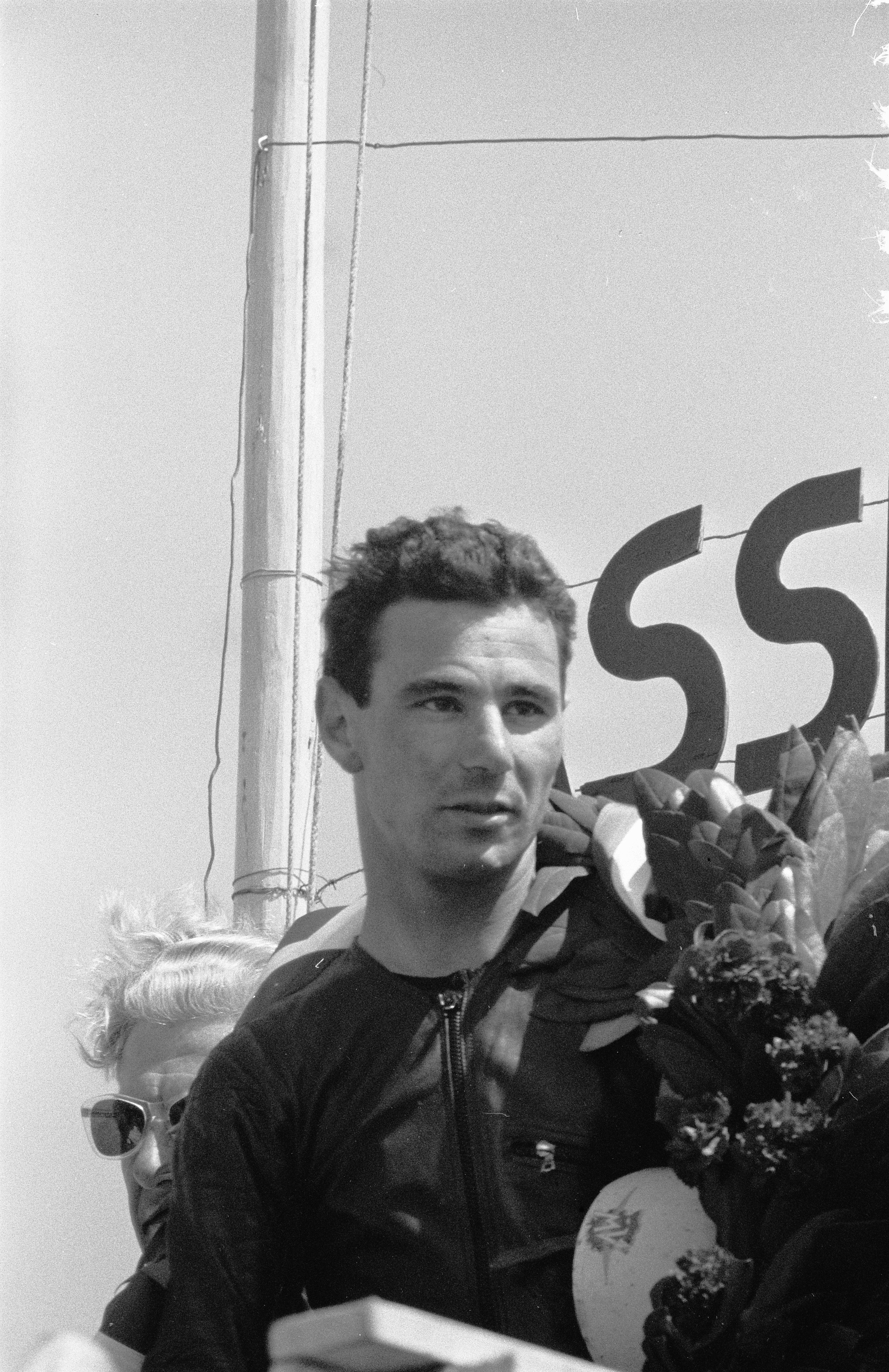
In his final season, Carlo Ubbiali successfully defended his 125cc and 250cc World Championship title.

The 1960 Grand Prix motorcycle racing season was the 12th F.I.M. Road Racing World Championship Grand Prix season. The season consisted of seven Grand Prix races in five classes: 500cc, 350cc, 250cc, 125cc and Sidecars 500cc. It began on 22 May, with French Grand Prix and ended with Nations Grand Prix in Italy on September 11.

John Surtees won the fourth and final 500cc championship after winning the German Grand Prix. On 28 July 1960, Surtees took to switch to Formula One shortly after winning the classes titles.

== 1960 Grand Prix season calendar ==
Round	Date	Grand Prix	Circuit	125cc winner	250cc winner	350cc winner	500cc winner	Sidecars 500cc winner	Report
1	22 May	(France) French Grand Prix	Circuit de Charade			(Federation of Rhodesia and Nyasaland) Gary Hocking	(United Kingdom) John Surtees	(West Germany) Fath / Wohlgemuth	Report
2	17 June	Isle of Man TT	Snaefell Mountain	(Italy) Carlo Ubbiali	(Federation of Rhodesia and Nyasaland) Gary Hocking	(United Kingdom) John Hartle	(United Kingdom) John Surtees	(West Germany) Fath / Wohlgemuth	Report
3	25 June	(Netherlands) Dutch TT	TT Circuit Assen	(Italy) Carlo Ubbiali	(Italy) Carlo Ubbiali	(United Kingdom) John Surtees	(Italy) Remo Venturi	(United Kingdom) Harris / Campbell	Report
4	3 July	(Belgium) Belgian Grand Prix	Spa-Francorchamps	(East Germany) Ernst Degner	(Italy) Carlo Ubbiali		(United Kingdom) John Surtees	(West Germany) Fath / Wohlgemuth	Report
5	24 July	(West Germany) German Grand Prix	Solitudering		(Federation of Rhodesia and Nyasaland) Gary Hocking		(United Kingdom) John Surtees	(West Germany) Fath / Wohlgemuth	Report
6	6 August	(Northern Ireland) Ulster Grand Prix	Dundrod Circuit	(Italy) Carlo Ubbiali	(Italy) Carlo Ubbiali	(United Kingdom) John Surtees	(United Kingdom) John Hartle		Report
7	11 September	(Italy) Nations Grand Prix	Monza	(Italy) Carlo Ubbiali	(Italy) Carlo Ubbiali	(Federation of Rhodesia and Nyasaland) Gary Hocking	(United Kingdom) John Surtees		Report

== Standings ==
=== Scoring system ===
Points were awarded to the top six finishers in each race. Only the four best races were counted in all five classes: the Sidecars, 125cc, 250cc, 350cc and 500cc championships.

Position	1st	2nd	3rd	4th	5th	6th
Points	8	6	4	3	2	1

==== 500cc final standings ====
Pos	Rider	Machine	FRA (France)	MAN (Isle of Man)	HOL (Netherlands)	BEL (Belgium)	GER (Germany)	ULS (Northern Ireland)	NAC (Italy)	Pts
1	(United Kingdom) John Surtees	MV Agusta	1	**1**	Ret	1	1	2	**1**	**32** (46)
2	(Italy) Remo Venturi	MV Agusta	2		1	2	**2**		Ret	**26**
3	(United Kingdom) John Hartle	MV Agusta / Norton		2	Ret	8		1	5	**16**
4	(Australia) Bob Brown	Norton	3	6	2	3				**15**
-	(Italy) Emilio Mendogni	MV Agusta			3	6	3		2	**15**
6	(United Kingdom) Mike Hailwood	Norton		3	5	4		Ret	3	**13**
7	(South Africa) Paddy Driver	Norton	4	9	4	Ret	7	Ret	4	**9**
8	(United Kingdom) Dickie Dale	Norton		5	6	12	4	7	9	**6**
9	(Federation of Rhodesia and Nyasaland) Jim Redman	Norton		15		5	Ret	5	6	**5**
10	(United Kingdom) Alan Shepherd	Matchless		Ret				3		**4**
11	(Australia) Tom Phillis	Norton		4				6		**4**
12	(United Kingdom) Ralph Rensen	Norton		10				4		**3**
13	(New Zealand) John Hempleman	Norton	9			7	5			**2**
14	(Austria) Ladislaus Richter	Norton	5	Ret		Ret	Ret			**2**
15	(Japan) Fumio Ito	BMW	6		10	10				**1**
16	(Germany) Rudolf Gläser	Norton			Ret	15	6		Ret	**1**
17	(New Zealand) Hugh Anderson	Norton	7	Ret				Ret	7	**0**
18	(United Kingdom) Frank Perris	Norton			7	Ret		Ret		**0**
19	(United Kingdom) Tony Godfrey	Norton		7						**0**
20	(Australia) Jack Findlay	Norton			11	Ret	12	13	8	**0**
21	(Germany) Hans-Günter Jäger	BMW	11		Ret	16	8		Ret	**0**
22	(United Kingdom) Robert Weston	Norton	8		Ret	14				**0**
23	(United Kingdom) Bob Anderson	Norton		8	Ret	Ret		Ret	Ret	**0**
24	(Australia) Ron Miles	Norton			8	Ret		Ret		**0**
25	(United Kingdom) Bruce Daniels	Norton						8		**0**
26	(Austria) Bert Schneider	Norton		Ret	Ret	9	9			**0**
27	(United Kingdom) Steve Murray	Matchless		28				9		**0**
28	(Germany) Ernst Hiller	BMW			9					**0**
29	(France) Jacques Insermini	Norton	10			13	10	Ret	10	**0**
30	(United Kingdom) Peter Middleton	Norton		14				10		**0**
31	(Germany) Lothar John	BMW	13				17		11	**0**
32	(New Zealand) Peter Pawson	Norton		Ret		11		Ret		**0**
33	(Germany) Alois Huber	BMW					11			**0**
=	(United Kingdom) John Lewis	Norton		11						**0**
=	(Northern Ireland) George Purvis	Matchless						11		**0**
36	(South Africa) Jannie Stander	Norton	12	27						**0**
37	(Germany) Heinz Kauert	Matchless					Ret		12	**0**
38	(Netherlands) Anton Elbersen	BMW			12					**0**
=	(United Kingdom) Roy Ingram	Norton		12						**0**
=	(United Kingdom) Ray Spence	Norton						12		**0**
41	(United States) Allen Krupa	Norton		34			13			**0**
42	(United Kingdom) Bill Smith	Matchless		13						**0**
=	(Italy) Vasco Loro	Norton							13	**0**
44	(Belgium) Raymond Bogaerdt	Norton			Ret	17	14			**0**
45	(France) Jean-Pierre Bayle	Norton	14			Ret	Ret			**0**
46	(United Kingdom) Vernon Cottle	Norton		Ret				14		**0**
47	(United Kingdom) Eddie Crooks	Norton		Ret				15		**0**
=	(Belgium) Raymond Hanset	Norton				Ret	15			**0**
=	(Germany) Fritz Kläger	Horex	15				Ret			**0**
50	(United Kingdom) Jack Bullock	Matchless		16				21		**0**
51	(France) Antoine Paba	Norton	16							**0**
=	(United Kingdom) Tommy Holmes	Norton						16		**0**
=	(Germany) Walter Scheimann	Norton					16			**0**
54	(United Kingdom) Syd Mizen	Matchless		17						**0**
=	(United Kingdom) Trevor Pound	Norton						17		**0**
=	(Germany) Hans Schmidt	Norton	17							0
57	(United Kingdom) Derek Powell	Matchless / Norton		18				18		0
58	(Germany) Fritz Meyer	BMW					18			0
=	(France) Guy Troncarelli	Norton	18							**0**
60	(United Kingdom) George Catlin	Matchless		19						**0**
=	(Sweden) Sven-Olov Gunnarsson	Norton						19		**0**
=	(Germany) Karl Recktenwald	Norton					19			**0**
63	(Northern Ireland) Billy McCosh	AJS		32				20		**0**
64	(United Kingdom) Terry Shepherd	Norton		20				Ret		**0**
65	(United Kingdom) Fred Stevens	Norton		21						**0**
66	(United Kingdom) Don Chapman	Norton		22						**0**
=	(Northern Ireland) Dick Creith	BSA						22		**0**
68	(United Kingdom) Jack Brett	Norton		23						**0**
=	(Northern Ireland) Martin Brosnan	Norton						23		**0**
70	(United Kingdom) Alf Shaw	Norton		36				24		**0**
71	(United Kingdom) Bob Rowbottom	Norton		24						**0**
72	(United Kingdom) Frank Gordon	Matchless						25		**0**
=	(United Kingdom) John Hurlstone	Norton		25						**0**
74	(United Kingdom) William Roberton	Norton						26		**0**
=	(United Kingdom) Derek Russell	Norton		26						**0**
76	(Northern Ireland) Ernie Oliver	Norton						27		**0**
77	(Northern Ireland) Robert McCracken	Norton						28		**0**
78	(Italy) Alberto Pagani	Norton		29						**0**
=	(United Kingdom) Jack Redmond	Norton						29		**0**
80	(United Kingdom) Harry Grant	Norton		30						**0**
=	(Northern Ireland) Jack Shannon	BSA						30		**0**
82	(United Kingdom) Owen Greenwood	Triumph		31						**0**
83	(United Kingdom) Ronald Cousins	Norton		33						**0**
84	(United Kingdom) Bill Beevers	Norton		35						**0**
85	(United Kingdom) Albert Moule	Norton		37						**0**
86	(United Kingdom) Patrick Manning	Norton		38						**0**
87	(United Kingdom) Joe Glazebrook	Norton		39						**0**
88	(United Kingdom) George Northwood	Norton		40						**0**
-	(United Kingdom) John Simmonds	Matchless		NC						**0**
-	(Canada) Dave Wildman	Norton		NC						**0**
-	(United Kingdom) Alan Trow	Norton		Ret		Ret		Ret		**0**
-	(United Kingdom) Bob McIntyre	Norton		Ret				Ret		0
-	(United Kingdom) Bill Prowting	AJS / Norton		Ret				Ret		0
-	(Northern Ireland) Tom Thorp	Matchless		Ret				Ret		0
-	(Netherlands) Martinus van Son	Norton					Ret		Ret	0
-	(United Kingdom) Chris Anderson	Norton						Ret		0
-	(France) Jean-Claude Bargetzi		Ret							0
-	(United Kingdom) James Beckett	Norton		Ret						0
-	(United Kingdom) Monty Buxton	Norton		Ret						0
-	(Italy) Paolo Campanelli	Norton							Ret	0
-	(United Kingdom) Geoff Canning	BSA						Ret		0
-	(United Kingdom) Roly Capner	BSA		Ret						**0**
-	(Sweden) Bror-Erland Carlsson	Matchless						Ret		**0**
-	(Sweden) Evert Carlsson	BMW					Ret			**0**
-	(United Kingdom) Louis Carr	Matchless		Ret						**0**
-	(United Kingdom) Peter Chatterton	Matchless		Ret						**0**
-	(Italy) Artemio Cirelli	Gilera							Ret	**0**
-	(United Kingdom) Sam Cooper	Norton		Ret						**0**
-	(Northern Ireland) Davy Crawford	Norton						Ret		**0**
-	(Italy) Giuseppe Dardanello	Norton							Ret	**0**
-	(United Kingdom) Graham Downes	Norton		Ret						**0**
-	(Canada) Mike Duff	Norton		Ret						**0**
-	(Sweden) Holger Ekström	Norton		Ret						**0**
-	(Sweden) Frans Fagerström	Matchless		Ret						**0**
-	(United Kingdom) Ray Fay	Matchless		Ret						**0**
-	(Germany) Hans-Siegfried Gläser	Norton					Ret			**0**
-	(Germany) Klaus Hamelmann	Münch					Ret			**0**
-	(Germany) Andreas Klaus	Norton					Ret			**0**
-	(United Kingdom) Den Jarman	Matchless		Ret						**0**
-	(Italy) Giuseppe Mantelli	Gilera							Ret	**0**
-	(Italy) Emanuele Maugliani	Gilera							Ret	**0**
-	(Italy) Alfredo Milani	Gilera							Ret	**0**
-	(United Kingdom) Derek Minter	Norton		Ret						**0**
-	(United Kingdom) Laurence Povey	BSA		Ret						**0**
-	(Netherlands) Gijs Oosterbaan	Norton					Ret			**0**
-	(United Kingdom) Llewelyn Ranson	Norton		Ret						**0**
-	(United Kingdom) Harold Riley	Norton		Ret						**0**
-	(United Kingdom) Bill Robertson	Norton		Ret						**0**
-	(Federation of Rhodesia and Nyasaland) Tommy Robinson	Norton					Ret			**0**
-	(Italy) Renzo Rossi	Gilera							Ret	**0**
-	(Australia) Graham Smith	Norton		Ret						**0**
-	(Federation of Rhodesia and Nyasaland) William van Leeuwen	Norton			Ret					**0**
-	(United Kingdom) Joe Wright	Norton		Ret						**0**
-	(Italy) Benedetto Zambotti	Gilera							Ret	**0**
Pos	Rider	Bike	FRA (France)	MAN (United Kingdom)	HOL (Netherlands)	BEL (Belgium)	GER (Germany)	ULS (Ulster)	NAC (Italy)	Pts

Colour	Result
Gold	Winner
Silver	Second place
Bronze	Third place
Green	Points classification
Blue	Non-points classification
Blue	Non-classified finish (NC)
Purple	Retired, not classified (Ret)
Red	Did not qualify (DNQ)
Red	Did not pre-qualify (DNPQ)
Black	Disqualified (DSQ)
White	Did not start (DNS)
White	Withdrew (WD)
White	Race cancelled (C)
Blank	Did not practice (DNP)
Blank	Did not arrive (DNA)
Blank	Excluded (EX)

**Bold** – Pole
Italics – Fastest Lap

=== 350cc Standings ===
Place	Rider	Number	Country	Machine	Points	Wins
1	(United Kingdom) John Surtees		United Kingdom	MV Agusta	22	2
2	(Federation of Rhodesia and Nyasaland) Gary Hocking		Rhodesia	MV Agusta	22	2
3	(United Kingdom) John Hartle		United Kingdom	MV Agusta / Norton	18	1
4	(Czechoslovakia) František Šťastný		Czechoslovakia	Jawa	12	0
5	(United Kingdom) Bob Anderson		United Kingdom	Norton	9	0
6	(Australia) Bob Brown		Australia	Norton	6	0
7	(New Zealand) Hugh Anderson		New Zealand	AJS	5	0
8	(United Kingdom) Dickie Dale		United Kingdom	Norton	5	0
9	(South Africa) Paddy Driver		South Africa	Norton	5	0
10	(United Kingdom) Bob McIntyre		United Kingdom	AJS	4	0
11	(United Kingdom) Derek Minter		United Kingdom	Norton	3	0
12	(United Kingdom) Ralph Rensen		United Kingdom	Norton	2	0
13	(United Kingdom) Frank Perris		United Kingdom	Norton	1	0
=	(New Zealand) John Hempleman		New Zealand	Norton	1	0

=== 250cc Standings ===
Place	Rider	Number	Country	Machine	Points	Wins
1	(Italy) Carlo Ubbiali		Italy	MV Agusta	32	4
2	(Federation of Rhodesia and Nyasaland) Gary Hocking		Rhodesia	MV Agusta	28	2
3	(Switzerland) Luigi Taveri		Switzerland	MV Agusta	11	0
4	(Federation of Rhodesia and Nyasaland) Jim Redman		Rhodesia	Honda	10	0
5	(United Kingdom) Mike Hailwood		United Kingdom	FB-Mondial	8	0
6	(Australia) Tom Phillis		Australia	Honda	6	0
7	(Japan) Kunimitsu Takahashi		Japan	Honda	6	0
8	(East Germany) Ernst Degner		East Germany	MZ	5	0
9	(Italy) Tarquinio Provini		Italy	Morini	4	0
=	(Japan) Kenjirō Tanaka		Japan	Honda	4	0
11	(Australia) Bob Brown		Australia	Honda	3	0
=	(New Zealand) John Hempleman		New Zealand	MZ	3	0
=	(United Kingdom) Dickie Dale		United Kingdom	MZ	3	0
14	(Japan) Moto Kitano		Japan	Honda	2	0
=	(Italy) Alberto Pagani		Italy	Aermacchi	2	0
=	(Italy) Gilberto Milani		Italy	Honda	2	0
17	(Japan) Naomi Taniguchi		Japan	Honda	1	0
=	(West Germany) Günter Beer		West Germany	Adler	1	0
=	(Japan) Yukio Satoh		Japan	Honda	1	0

=== 125cc ===
==== Riders' standings ====
Pos.	Rider	Bike	MAN (Isle of Man)	NED (Netherlands)	BEL (Belgium)	ULS (Northern Ireland)	NAT (Italy)	Pts
1	(Italy) Carlo Ubbiali	MV Agusta	1**^{F}**	1**^{F}**	3	1	1	24 (36)
2	(Federation of Rhodesia and Nyasaland) Gary Hocking	MV Agusta	2	2	5	2	5	18 (22)
3	(East Germany) Ernst Degner	MZ		5	1	3**^{F}**	3	16 (18)
4	(Italy) Bruno Spaggiari	MV Agusta			4**^{F}**	4	2**^{F}**	12
5	(New Zealand) John Hempleman	MZ	4		2**^{F}**	6		10
6	(Switzerland) Luigi Taveri	MV Agusta	3			5		6
7	(Federation of Rhodesia and Nyasaland) Jim Redman	Honda		4			4	6
8	(Italy) Alberto Gandossi	MZ		3				4
9	(United Kingdom) Bob Anderson	MZ	5					2
10	(Japan) Naomi Taniguchi	Honda	6					1
10	(Japan) Giichi Suzuki	Honda		6				1
10	(United Kingdom) Mike Hailwood	Ducati			6			1
10	(Japan) Kunimitsu Takahashi	Honda					6	1
Pos.	Rider	Bike	MAN (Isle of Man)	NED (Netherlands)	BEL (Belgium)	ULS (Northern Ireland)	NAT (Italy)	Pts

Race key
Colour	Result
Gold	Winner
Silver	2nd place
Bronze	3rd place
Green	Points finish
Blue	Non-points finish
Blue	Non-classified finish (NC)
Purple	Retired (Ret)
Red	Did not qualify (DNQ)
Black	Disqualified (DSQ)
White	Did not start (DNS)
White	Withdrew (WD)
White	Race cancelled (C)
Blank	Did not practice (DNP)
Blank	Excluded (EX)
Blank	Did not arrive (DNA)
Blank	Did not enter (empty cell)
Annotation	Meaning
P	Pole position
F	Fastest lap
Rider key
Colour	Meaning
Light blue	Rookie rider

==== Constructors' standings ====
Each constructor is awarded the same number of points as their best placed rider in each race.

Pos.	Constructor	MAN (Isle of Man)	NED (Netherlands)	BEL (Belgium)	ULS (Northern Ireland)	NAT (Italy)	Pts
1	(Italy) MV Agusta	1	1	3	1	1	24 (36)
2	(East Germany) MZ	4	3	1	3	3	16 (23)
3	(Japan) Honda	6	4			4	7
4	(Italy) Ducati			6			1
Pos.	Constructor	MAN (Isle of Man)	NED (Netherlands)	BEL (Belgium)	ULS (Northern Ireland)	NAT (Italy)	Pts
