= 1960 Ulster Grand Prix =

Motorcycle race in Northern Ireland

Race details
- Race 6 of 7 races in the 1960 Grand Prix motorcycle racing season
- Date: 6 August 1960
- Location: Dundrod Circuit
- Course: Public roads; 11.934 km (7.415 mi)

500cc
- Rider
Fastest lap
Rider	(United Kingdom) John Surtees	MV Agusta
Time	4:28.8	
Podium
First	(United Kingdom) John Hartle	Norton
Second	(United Kingdom) John Surtees	MV Agusta
Third	(United Kingdom) Alan Shepherd	Matchless

350cc
- Rider
Fastest lap
Rider	(United Kingdom) Alan Shepherd	AJS
Time	4:39.8	
Podium
First	(United Kingdom) John Surtees	MV Agusta
Second	(United Kingdom) John Hartle	Norton
Third	(New Zealand) Hugh Anderson	AJS

250cc
- Rider
Fastest lap
Rider	(Italy) Carlo Ubbiali	MV Agusta
Time	4:45.2	
Podium
First	(Italy) Carlo Ubbiali	MV Agusta
Second	(Australia) Tom Phillis	Honda
Third	(Federation of Rhodesia and Nyasaland) Jim Redman	Honda

125cc
- Rider
Fastest lap
Rider	(East Germany) Ernst Degner	MZ
Time	5:11.6	
Podium
First	(Italy) Carlo Ubbiali	MV Agusta
Second	(Federation of Rhodesia and Nyasaland) Gary Hocking	MV Agusta
Third	(East Germany) Ernst Degner	MZ

The 1960 Ulster Grand Prix was the sixth round of the 1960 Grand Prix motorcycle racing season. It took place on 6 August 1960 at the Dundrod Circuit.

== 500 cc classification ==
Pos	Rider	Manufacturer	Laps	Time	Points
1	(United Kingdom) John Hartle	Norton	20	1:35:18.8	8
2	(United Kingdom) John Surtees	MV Agusta	20	+20.4	6
3	(United Kingdom) Alan Shepherd	Matchless	20	+1:36.4	4
4	(United Kingdom) Ralph Rensen	Norton	20	+2:31.2	3
5	(Federation of Rhodesia and Nyasaland) Jim Redman	Norton	20	+2:31.2	2
6	(Australia) Tom Phillis	Norton	20	+3:06.6	1
7	(United Kingdom) Dickie Dale	Norton	20	+3:10.2	
8	(United Kingdom) Bruce Daniels	Norton	19	+1 lap	
9	(United Kingdom) Steve Murray	Matchless	19	+1 lap	
10	(United Kingdom) Peter Middleton	Norton	19	+1 lap	
11	(Northern Ireland) George Purvis	Matchless	19	+1 lap	
12	(United Kingdom) Ray Spence	Norton	19	+1 lap	
13	(Australia) Jack Findlay	Norton	19	+1 lap	
14	(United Kingdom) Vernon Cottle	Norton	19	+1 lap	
15	(United Kingdom) Eddie Crooks	Norton	19	+1 lap	
16	(United Kingdom) Tommy Holmes	Matchless	19	+1 lap	
17	(United Kingdom) Trevor Pound	Norton	19	+1 lap	
18	(United Kingdom) Derek Powell	Norton	19	+1 lap	
19	(Sweden) Sven-Olof Gunnarson	Norton	19	+1 lap	
20	(Northern Ireland) Billy McCosh	AJS	19	+1 lap	
21	(United Kingdom) Jack Bullock	Matchless	18	+2 laps	
22	(Northern Ireland) Dick Creith	BSA	18	+2 laps	
23	(Northern Ireland) Martin Brosnan	Norton	18	+2 laps	
24	(United Kingdom) Alf Shaw	Norton	18	+2 laps	
25	(United Kingdom) Frank Gordon	Matchless	17	+3 laps	
26	(United Kingdom) William Roberton	Matchless	17	+3 laps	
27	(Northern Ireland) Ernie Oliver	AJS	17	+3 laps	
28	(Northern Ireland) Robert McCracken	Norton	17	+3 laps	
29	(United Kingdom) Jack Redmond	BSA	17	+3 laps	
30	(Northern Ireland) Jack Shannon	BSA	17	+3 laps	

== 350 cc classification ==
Pos	Rider	Manufacturer	Laps	Time	Points
1	(United Kingdom) John Surtees	MV Agusta	20	1:35:17.4	8
2	(United Kingdom) John Hartle	Norton	20	+34.4	6
3	(New Zealand) Hugh Anderson	AJS	20	+3:31.4	4
4	(United Kingdom) Bob Anderson	Norton	20	+3:33.4	3
5	(United Kingdom) Dickie Dale	Norton	20	+3:39.8	2
6	(South Africa) Paddy Driver	Norton	20	+4:25.0	1
7	(New Zealand) Peter Pawson	AJS	20		
8	(United Kingdom) Ralph Rensen	Norton	20		
9	(United Kingdom) Peter Middleton	Norton	19	+1 lap	
10	(Australia) Ron Miles	Norton	19	+1 lap	
11	(Australia) Jack Findlay	Norton	19	+1 lap	
12	(United Kingdom) Billy McCosh	AJS	19	+1 lap	
13	J. Bullock	Norton	19	+1 lap	
14	(United Kingdom) Bruce Daniels	Norton	19	+1 lap	
15	T. Pound	Norton	19	+1 lap	
16	D. Crawford	Norton	19	+1 lap	
17	T. H. Turner	Norton	19	+1 lap	
18	(United Kingdom) Eddie Crooks	Norton	18	+2 laps	
19	(United Kingdom) Bill Robertson	Norton	18	+2 laps	
20	G. J. Canning	BSA	18	+2 laps	
21	C. L. F. Anderson	Norton	18	+2 laps	
22	A. E. Shaw	Norton	18	+2 laps	
23	A. Jardin	Norton	18	+2 laps	
24	(United Kingdom) Ernie Oliver	Norton	17	+3 laps	
25	J. Brown	Norton	17	+3 laps	
26	B. E. Carlzen	AJS	17	+3 laps	
27	J. Shannon	BSA	17	+3 laps	
28	W. J. Spratt	Norton	17	+3 laps	
29	B. Bradford	BSA	17	+3 laps	
30	T. Finlay	Norton	17	+3 laps	
31	A. McCall	BSA	15	+5 laps	
32	S. McAvoy	BSA	14	+6 laps	

== 250 cc classification ==
Pos	Rider	Manufacturer	Laps	Time	Points
1	(Italy) Carlo Ubbiali	MV Agusta	12	58:47.2	8
2	(Australia) Tom Phillis	Honda	12	+2.0	6
3	(Federation of Rhodesia and Nyasaland) Jim Redman	Honda	12	+3.2	4
4	(United Kingdom) Mike Hailwood	Ducati	12	+1:29.6	3
5	(Japan) Kunimitsu Takahashi	Honda	12	+2:10.0	2
6	(Switzerland) Luigi Taveri	MV Agusta	12	+2:33.2	1
7	(Japan) Yukio Sato	Honda	12		
8	(Republic of Ireland) Gerard Carter	NSU	12		
9	(United Kingdom) John Dixon	Adler	11	+1 lap	
10	(United Kingdom) Noel Orr	NSU	11	+1 lap	
11	D. G. Andrews	NSU	11	+1 lap	
12	H. Stanford	Mead Norton	10	+2 laps	
13	R. Wylie	AJS	10	+2 laps	
14	C. Donaghy	Royal Enfield	10	+2 laps	
15	F. Gordon	Royal Enfield	9	+3 laps	

== 125 cc classification ==
Pos	Rider	Manufacturer	Laps	Time	Points
1	(Italy) Carlo Ubbiali	MV Agusta	10	53:21.8	8
2	(Federation of Rhodesia and Nyasaland) Gary Hocking	MV Agusta	10	+0.2	6
3	(East Germany) Ernst Degner	MZ	10	+8.4	4
4	(Italy) Bruno Spaggiari	MV Agusta	10	+49.8	3
5	(Switzerland) Luigi Taveri	MV Agusta	10	+1:15.8	2
6	(New Zealand) John Hempleman	MZ	10	+1:18.4	1
7	(Japan) S. Fukuda	Honda	10		
8	(Japan) Yukio Sato	Honda	10		
8	(Republic of Ireland) Gerard Carter	Honda	10		
9	(United Kingdom) Noel Orr	Honda	10		
10	(United Kingdom) Rex Avery	EMC	9	+1 lap	
11	J. Brening	Ducati	9	+1 lap	
12	C. J. Percival	MV Agusta	8	+2 laps	
13	A. J. West	Ducati	8	+2 laps	
14	H. Dunlop	MV Agusta	8	+2 laps	
20 starters, 15 finishers

Previous race: 1960 German Grand Prix	FIM Grand Prix World Championship; 1960 season	Next race: 1960 Nations Grand Prix
Previous race: 1959 Ulster Grand Prix	Ulster Grand Prix	Next race: 1961 Ulster Grand Prix
