= Alberto Pagani =

Italian motorcycle racer

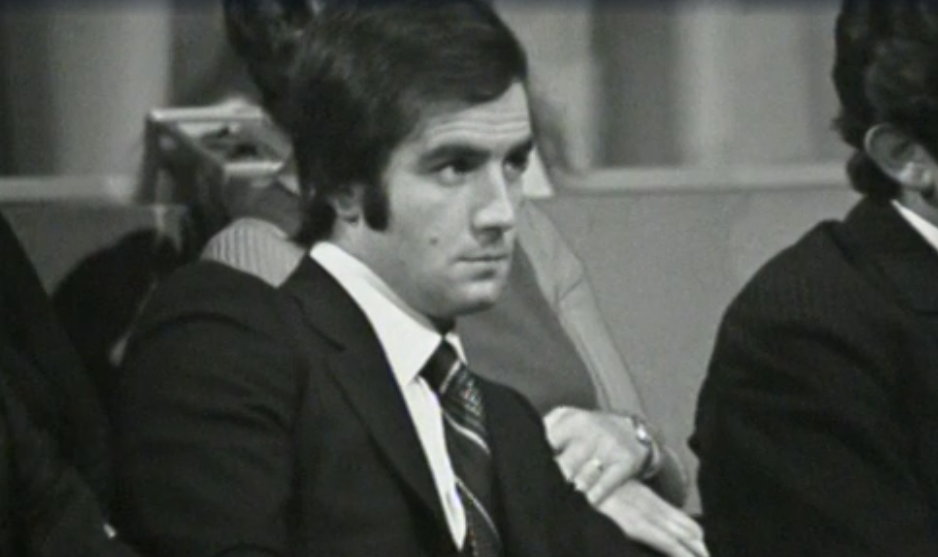
- Alberto Pagani (1972)
- Nationality: Italian
Motorcycle racing career statistics
Grand Prix motorcycle racing
Active years	1959 – 1972
First race	1959 125cc Ulster Grand Prix
Last race	1972 500cc Finnish Grand Prix
First win	1969 500cc Nations Grand Prix
Last win	1972 500cc Yugoslavian Grand Prix
Team(s)	Honda, MV Agusta
Starts / Wins / Podiums / Poles / F. laps / Points; 43 / 3 / 19 / 0 / 0 / 248

Alberto Pagani (29 August 1938 – 11 September 2017) was an Italian professional Grand Prix motorcycle road racer. His best year was in 1972 when he finished second in the 500cc world championship, behind his MV Agusta teammate, Giacomo Agostini. He was the son of Nello Pagani, the 1949 125 cc World Champion.

== Motorcycle Grand Prix results ==
Points system from 1950 to 1968:

**Position**	1	2	3	4	5	6
**Points**	8	6	4	3	2	1

Points system from 1969 onwards:

**Position**	1	2	3	4	5	6	7	8	9	10
**Points**	15	12	10	8	6	5	4	3	2	1

(key) (Races in bold indicate pole position; races in italics indicate fastest lap)

Year	Class	Team	1	2	3	4	5	6	7	8	9	10	11	12	13	Points	Rank	Wins
1959	125cc	Ducati	IOM -	GER -	NED -	BEL -	SWE -	ULS; 5	NAT -							2	13th	0
1960	125cc	MV Agusta		IOM; 12	NED -	BEL -		ULS -	NAT -							0	-	0
1960	250cc	Aermacchi		IOM -	NED -	BEL; 5	GER -	ULS -	NAT -							2	14th	0
1960	350cc	Norton	FRA -	IOM; 31	NED -			ULS -	NAT -							0	-	0
1960	500cc	Norton	FRA -	IOM; 29	NED -	BEL -	GER -	ULS -	NAT -							0	-	0
1961	250cc	Aermacchi	ESP -	GER -	FRA -	IOM; NC	NED -	BEL -	DDR -	ULS -	NAT -	SWE -	ARG -			0	-	0
1961	500cc	Norton		GER -	FRA -	IOM -	NED -	BEL -	DDR -	ULS -	NAT; 4	SWE -	ARG -			3	15th	0
1962	125cc	Honda	ESP -	FRA -	IOM -	NED -	BEL -	GER -	ULS -	DDR -	NAT; 5	FIN -	ARG -			2	19th	0
1962	250cc	Honda	ESP; 5	FRA -	IOM; 5	NED -	BEL -	GER -	ULS -	DDR -	NAT; 3		ARG -			8	9th	0
1963	50cc	Kreidler	ESP; 5	GER -	FRA; 6	IOM; NC	NED -	BEL -			FIN; 5		ARG; 3	JPN -		9	7th	0
1963	350cc	Norton		GER -		IOM; 22	NED -		ULS -	DDR -	FIN -	NAT -				0	-	0
1964	250cc	Paton	USA -	ESP -	FRA -	IOM; 3	NED -	BEL -	GER -	DDR; 5	ULS -	NAT -	JPN -			6	11th	0
1965	250cc	Aermacchi	USA -	GER -	ESP; 6	FRA -	IOM; NC	NED -	BEL -	DDR -	CZE -	ULS -	FIN -	NAT -	JPN -	1	28th	0
1965	350cc	Aermacchi		GER -			IOM; NC	NED -		DDR -	CZE -	ULS -	FIN -	NAT -	JPN -	0	-	0
1966	250cc	Aermacchi	ESP -	GER -	FRA -	NED -	BEL -	DDR -	CZE -	FIN -	ULS -	IOM; NC	NAT; 3	JPN -		4	14th	0
1966	350cc	Aermacchi		GER -	FRA -	NED -		DDR; 5	CZE; 6	FIN -	ULS -	IOM; NC	NAT; 3	JPN; 3		11	6th	0
1967	250cc	Aermacchi	ESP -	GER -	FRA -	IOM; NC	NED -	BEL -	DDR -	CZE -	FIN -	ULS -	NAT -	CAN -	JPN -	0	-	0
1967	350cc	Aermacchi		GER; 4		IOM; 4	NED -		DDR -	CZE; 5		ULS; 2	NAT; 4		JPN -	11	6th	0
1968	500cc	Linto	GER -	ESP -	IOM -	NED -	BEL -	DDR; 2	CZE -	FIN -	ULS -	NAT; 4				9	4th	0
1969	350cc	Aermacchi	ESP -	GER -		IOM; NC	NED -		DDR -	CZE -	FIN -	ULS -	NAT -	YUG -		0	-	0
1969	500cc	Linto	ESP -	GER -	FRA -	IOM; NC	NED -	BEL -	DDR -	CZE -	FIN -	ULS -	NAT; 1	YUG -		15	14th	1
1970	250cc	Aermacchi	GER -	FRA -	YUG -	IOM -	NED -	BEL -	DDR -	CZE -	FIN -	ULS -	NAT -	ESP; 7		4	32nd	0
1970	500cc	Linto	GER -	FRA; 3	YUG -	IOM -	NED; 3	BEL -	DDR -	CZE -	FIN; 3	ULS -	NAT -	ESP -		30	5th	0
1971	125cc	Derbi	AUT -	GER -	IOM -	NED -	BEL -	DDR -	CZE -	SWE -	FIN; 7		NAT -	ESP -		4	24th	0
1971	250cc	Suzuki	AUT -	GER -	IOM; 32	NED -	BEL -	DDR -	CZE -	SWE -	FIN -	ULS -	NAT -	ESP -		0	-	0
1971	500cc	Linto	AUT; 7	GER; 5	IOM; NC	NED -	BEL -	DDR -		SWE -	FIN; 7	ULS -				29	8th	1
1971	500cc	MV Agusta											NAT; 1	ESP -		29	8th	1
1972	350cc	MV Agusta	GER -	FRA -	AUT -	NAT -	IOM -	YUG -	NED -		DDR; 8	CZE -	SWE -	FIN -	ESP -	4	28th	0
1972	500cc	MV Agusta	GER; 2	FRA -	AUT -	NAT; 2	IOM; 2	YUG; 1	NED; 2	BEL; 2	DDR -	CZE -	SWE -	FIN; 2	ESP -	87	2nd	1
