= 1960 Isle of Man TT =

Annual motorcycle racing event

Race details
- Race 2 of 7 races in the 1960 Grand Prix motorcycle racing season
- Date: 13–17 June 1960
- Official name: Isle of Man Tourist Trophy
- Location: Snaefell Mountain Course
- Course: Public roads; 60.72 km (37.73 mi)

500cc
- Rider
Fastest lap
Rider	(United Kingdom) John Surtees	MV Agusta
Time	21:45.0	
Podium
First	(United Kingdom) John Surtees	MV Agusta
Second	(United Kingdom) John Hartle	MV Agusta
Third	(United Kingdom) Mike Hailwood	Norton

350cc
- Rider
Fastest lap
Rider	(United Kingdom) John Surtees	MV Agusta
Time	22:49.4	
Podium
First	(United Kingdom) John Hartle	MV Agusta
Second	(United Kingdom) John Surtees	MV Agusta
Third	(United Kingdom) Bob McIntyre	AJS

250cc
- Rider
Fastest lap
Rider	(Italy) Carlo Ubbiali	MV Agusta
Time	23:42.8	
Podium
First	(Federation of Rhodesia and Nyasaland) Gary Hocking	MV Agusta
Second	(Italy) Carlo Ubbiali	MV Agusta
Third	(Italy) Tarquinio Provini	Moto Morini

125cc
- Rider
Fastest lap
Rider	(Italy) Carlo Ubbiali	MV Agusta
Time	26:17.6	
Podium
First	(Italy) Carlo Ubbiali	MV Agusta
Second	(Federation of Rhodesia and Nyasaland) Gary Hocking	MV Agusta
Third	(Italy) Luigi Taveri	MV Agusta

Sidecar (B2A)
- Rider
Fastest lap
Rider	(Germany) Helmut Fath	BMW
Time	23:13.0	
Podium
First	(Germany) Helmut Fath	BMW
Second	(United Kingdom) Pip Harris	BMW
Third	(United Kingdom) Charlie Freeman	Norton

The 1960 Isle of Man TT was the second round of the 1960 Grand Prix motorcycle racing season. It took place between 13 June and 17 June 1960 at the Snaefell Mountain Course.

== Senior TT (500 cc) classification ==
Pos	Rider	Manufacturer	Laps	Time	Points
1	(United Kingdom) John Surtees	MV Agusta	6	2:12:35.2	8
2	(United Kingdom) John Hartle	MV Agusta	6	+2:39.0	6
3	(United Kingdom) Mike Hailwood	Norton	6	+5:36.4	4
4	(Australia) Tom Phillis	Norton	6	+6:24.6	3
5	(United Kingdom) Dickie Dale	Norton	6	+6:34.6	2
6	(Australia) Bob Brown	Norton	6	+7:16.2	1
7	(United Kingdom) Tony Godfrey	Norton	6	+8:09.0	
8	(United Kingdom) Bob Anderson	Norton	6	+8:41.8	
9	(South Africa) Paddy Driver	Norton	6	+10:32.6	
10	(United Kingdom) Ralph Rensen	Norton	6	+10:32.8	
40 finishers

== Junior TT (350 cc) classification ==
Pos	Rider	Manufacturer	Laps	Time	Points
1	(United Kingdom) John Hartle	MV Agusta	6	2:20:28.8	8
2	(United Kingdom) John Surtees	MV Agusta	6	+1:55.4	6
3	(United Kingdom) Bob McIntyre	AJS	6	+2:21.6	4
4	(United Kingdom) Derek Minter	Norton	6	+4:36.8	3
5	(United Kingdom) Ralph Rensen	Norton	6	+7:52.6	2
6	(United Kingdom) Bob Anderson	Norton	6	+7:56.4	1
7	(United Kingdom) Alan Shepherd	AJS	6	+8:29.4	
8	(United Kingdom) John Lewis	Norton	6	+8:31.2	
9	(United Kingdom) Brian Setchell	Norton	6	+8:38.6	
10	(United Kingdom) George Catlin	AJS	6	+8:51.2	
56 finishers

== Lightweight TT (250 cc) classification ==
Pos	Rider	Manufacturer	Laps	Time	Points
1	(Federation of Rhodesia and Nyasaland) Gary Hocking	MV Agusta	5	2:00.53.0	8
2	(Italy) Carlo Ubbiali	MV Agusta	5	+40.4	6
3	(Italy) Tarquinio Provini	Moto Morini	5	+51.6	4
4	(Australia) Bob Brown	Honda	5	+6:00.8	3
5	(Japan) Moto Kitano	Honda	5	+17:18.0	2
6	(Japan) Naomi Taniguchi	Honda	5	+19:48.0	1
7	(United Kingdom) Mike O'Rourke	Ariel	5	+20:18.0	
8	(Switzerland) Luigi Taveri	MV Agusta	5	+24:41.2	
9	(Italy) Osvaldo Perfetti	Bianchi	5	+25:03.6	
10	(United Kingdom) Alan Dugdale	NSU	5	+26:08.4	
17 finishers

== Ultra Lightweight TT (125cc) classification ==
Pos	Rider	Manufacturer	Laps	Time	Points
1	(Italy) Carlo Ubbiali	MV Agusta	3	1:19:21.2	8
2	(Federation of Rhodesia and Nyasaland) Gary Hocking	MV Agusta	3	+19.8	6
3	(Italy) Luigi Taveri	MV Agusta	3	+20.1	4
4	(New Zealand) John Hempleman	MZ	3	+2:14.6	3
5	(United Kingdom) Bob Anderson	MZ	3	+2:39.6	2
6	(Japan) Naomi Taniguchi	Honda	3	+5:27.8	1
7	(Japan) Giichi Suzuki	Honda	3	+5:36.2	
8	(Japan) Sadao Shimazaki	Honda	3	+5:40.8	
9	(Japan) Teisuke Tanaka	Honda	3	+5:46.2	
10	(Australia) Tom Phillis	Honda	3	+7:58.0	
33 starters, 22 finishers

== Sidecar TT classification ==
Pos	Rider	Passenger	Manufacturer	Laps	Time	Points
1	(Germany) Helmut Fath	(Germany) Alfred Wohlgemuth	BMW	3	1:20:45.8	8
2	(United Kingdom) Pip Harris	(United Kingdom) Ray Campbell	BMW	3	+1:24.4	6
3	(United Kingdom) Charlie Freeman	(United Kingdom) Billie Nelson	Norton	3	+7:21.4	4
4	(United Kingdom) Les Wells	(United Kingdom) Tony Cook	Norton	3	+7:36.2	3
5	(Switzerland) Florian Camathias	(Germany) Roland Föll	BMW	3	+8:12.2	2
6	(Germany) Alwin Ritter	(Germany) Emil Hörner	BMW	3	+9:35.2	1
7	(United Kingdom) Bill Beevers	(United Kingdom) John Chisnall	BMW	3	+10:01.8	
8	(United Kingdom) Pat Millard	(United Kingdom) G. Spence	Norton	3	+11:20.0	
9	(United Kingdom) Brian Green	(United Kingdom) D. Fynn	Norton	3	+12:30.0	
10	(United Kingdom) Derek Yorke	(United Kingdom) G. Mason	Norton	3	+12:38.8	
20 finishers

Previous race: 1960 French Grand Prix	FIM Grand Prix World Championship; 1960 season	Next race: 1960 Dutch TT
Previous race: 1959 Isle of Man TT	Isle of Man TT	Next race: 1961 Isle of Man TT
