= 1965 Isle of Man TT =

Annual motorcycle racing event

The 1965 Isle of Man TT motorcycle races were contested in six categories over the Snaefell Mountain Course. The Senior TT was won by Mike Hailwood on an MV Agusta.

== 1965 Isle of Man Lightweight TT 125cc final standings ==
3 Laps (113.00 Miles) Mountain Course.

| Place | Rider | Number | Country | Machine | Speed | Time | Points |
|---|---|---|---|---|---|---|---|
| 1 | (United Kingdom) Phil Read | | United Kingdom | Yamaha | 94.28 mph | 1:12.02.6 | 8 |
| 2 | (Switzerland) Luigi Taveri | | Switzerland | Honda | 94.15 mph | 1:12.08.4 | 6 |
| 3 | (Canada) Mike Duff | | Canada | Yamaha | 93.83 mph | 1:12.23.6 | 4 |
| 4 | (United Kingdom) Derek Woodman | | United Kingdom | MZ | 92.19 mph | 1:13.40.8 | 3 |
| 5 | (New Zealand) Hugh Anderson | | New Zealand | Suzuki | 91.62 mph | 1:14.08.0 | 2 |
| 6 | (Northern Ireland) Ralph Bryans | | United Kingdom | Honda | 90.89 mph | 1:14.44.0 | 1 |

== 1965 Sidecar TT final standings ==
3 Laps (113.00 Miles) Mountain Course.

| Place | Rider | Number | Country | Machine | Speed | Time | Points |
|---|---|---|---|---|---|---|---|
| 1 | (West Germany) Max Deubel/Emil Horner | | West Germany | BMW | 90.57 mph | 1:14.59.8 | 8 |
| 2 | (Switzerland) Fritz Scheidegger/J.Robinson | | Switzerland | BMW | 89.11 mph | 1:15.13.8 | 6 |
| 3 | (West Germany) Georg Auerbacher/R.Rykers | | West Germany | BMW | 84.45 mph | 1:20.26.2 | 4 |
| 4 | (West Germany) Hans Luthringhauser/H.Hahn | | West Germany | BMW | 84.11 mph | 1:20.45.6 | 3 |
| 5 | (United Kingdom) Tony Baitup/Graham Geer | | United Kingdom | Triumph | 84.02 mph | 1:20.48.8 | 2 |
| 6 | (United Kingdom) Charlie Freeman/B.Nelson | | United Kingdom | Norton | 80.90 mph | 1:23.57.8 | 1 |

== 1965 Isle of Man Lightweight TT 250cc final standings ==
6 Laps (226.38 Miles) Mountain Course.

| Place | Rider | Number | Country | Machine | Speed | Time | Points |
|---|---|---|---|---|---|---|---|
| 1 | (Rhodesia) Jim Redman | | Rhodesia | Honda | 97.19 mph | 2:19.45.8 | 8 |
| 2 | (Canada) Mike Duff | | Canada | Yamaha | 94.71 mph | 2:23.26.4 | 6 |
| 3 | (United Kingdom) Frank Perris | | United Kingdom | Suzuki | 93.99 mph | 2:24.32.0 | 4 |
| 4 | (Italy) Tarquinio Provini | | Italy | Benelli | 93.57 mph | 2:25.10.0 | 3 |
| 5 | (Czechoslovakia) František Šťastný | | Czechoslovakia | Jawa | 90.34 mph | 2:30.22.2 | 2 |
| 6 | (United Kingdom) Dave Williams | | United Kingdom | Mondial | 88.23 mph | 2:33.58.0 | 1 |

== 1965 Isle of Man Junior TT 350cc final standings ==
6 Laps (236.38 Miles) Mountain Course.

| Place | Rider | Number | Country | Machine | Speed | Time | Points |
|---|---|---|---|---|---|---|---|
| 1 | (Rhodesia) Jim Redman | | Rhodesia | Honda | 100.72 mph | 2:14.55.2 | 8 |
| 2 | (United Kingdom) Phil Read | | United Kingdom | Yamaha | 99.35 mph | 2:16.44.4 | 6 |
| 3 | (Italy) Giacomo Agostini | | Italy | MV Agusta | 98.52 mph | 2:17.53.4 | 4 |
| 4 | (Rhodesia) Bruce Beale | | Rhodesia | Honda | 93.29 mph | 2:25.37.2 | 3 |
| 5 | (United Kingdom) Griff A.Jenkins | | United Kingdom | Norton | 92.61 mph | 2:26.41.4 | 2 |
| 6 | (Italy) Gilberto Milani | | Italy | Aermacchi | 92.49 mph | 2:26.52.4 | 1 |

== 1965 50cc Ultra-Lightweight TT final standings ==
3 Laps (113.00 Miles) Mountain Course.

| Place | Rider | Number | Country | Machine | Speed | Time | Points |
|---|---|---|---|---|---|---|---|
| 1 | (Switzerland) Luigi Taveri | | Switzerland | Honda | 79.66 mph | 1:25.16.6 | 8 |
| 2 | (New Zealand) Hugh Anderson | | New Zealand | Suzuki | 78.85 mph | 1:26.08.8 | 6 |
| 3 | (West Germany) Ernst Degner | | West Germany | Suzuki | 77.04 mph | 1:28.10.0 | 4 |
| 4 | (United Kingdom) Charlie Mates | | United Kingdom | Honda | 65.61 mph | 1:43.41.4 | 3 |
| 5 | (United Kingdom) Ian Plumridge | | United Kingdom | Derbi | 63.43 mph | 1:47.05.4 | 2 |
| 6 | (United Kingdom) Ernie L Griffiths | | United Kingdom | Honda | 61.35 mph | 1:50.43.0 | 1 |

== 1965 Isle of Man Senior TT 500cc final standings ==
6 Laps (236.38 Miles) Mountain Course.

| Place | Rider | Number | Country | Machine | Speed | Time | Points |
|---|---|---|---|---|---|---|---|
| 1 | (United Kingdom) Mike Hailwood | | United Kingdom | MV Agusta | 91.69 mph | 2:28.09.0 | 8 |
| 2 | (United Kingdom) Joe Dunphy | | United Kingdom | Norton | 90.28 mph | 2:30.28.8 | 6 |
| 3 | (Canada) Mike Duff | | Canada | Matchless | 88.09 mph | 2:34.12.0 | 4 |
| 4 | (United Kingdom) Ian Burne | | United Kingdom | Norton | 87.63 mph | 2:35.01.06 | 3 |
| 5 | (Wales) Selwyn Griffiths | | United Kingdom | Matchless | 87.00 mph | 2:36.08.6 | 2 |
| 6 | (United Kingdom) Billy McCosh | | United Kingdom | Matchless | 86.90 mph | 2:36.19.4 | 1 |
