= Frank Perris =

British motorcycle racer

- Born: May 28, 1931; Toronto, Ontario, Canada
- Died: March 17, 2015 (aged 83); Isle of Wight, England
Motorcycle racing career statistics
Grand Prix motorcycle racing
Active years	1960 - 1966, 1969, 1971
First race	1960 350cc French Grand Prix
Last race	1971 500cc Belgian Grand Prix
First win	1963 125cc Japanese Grand Prix
Last win	1965 125cc Czechoslovakian Grand Prix
Team	Suzuki
Championships	0
Starts / Wins / Podiums / Poles / F. laps / Points; 40 / 3 / 18 / 0 / 2 / 163
Isle of Man TT career
TTs contested	18
TT wins	0
TT podiums	4

Frank Perris (May 28, 1931 – March 17, 2015) was a Canadian Grand Prix motorcycle road racer and TT rider from Toronto. Perris was noticed by the Suzuki team after his third-place in the 1961 500 cc World Championship, becoming a contracted-rider from 1962 until 1966. His best season was in 1965 when he won two 125cc Grand Prix races aboard a Suzuki two-stroke, and finished the year in second place in the 125cc world championship behind Hugh Anderson.

Perris later became Competitions Manager for Norton-Villiers, running the reformed works Norton road-race team.

== Early race years ==
Perris moved to England with his parents in 1938 and started road-riding during 1948 in the Chester area, firstly on a 1914 Douglas then buying a 1934 BSA Blue Star when joining the Chester Motor Club.

After visiting the Isle of Man TT races in 1949, Perris was inspired to race and for 1950 sold his BSA Blue Star, instead buying a 1934 250 cc Velocette MOV and a 1931 Norton International. After converting these for road-racing, at Easter he entered his first race held at Antelope race track, Rhydymwyn, near Mold, North Wales, crashing the Velo in the 250 race but, luckily uninjured, he completed the 500 race on the Inter.

For the 1951 season, Perris sold the MOV, buying a Velocette KTT, riding at different circuits for experience and entering his first TT race. He also benefited by a sponsored bike, an OK Supreme provided by Bill Smith's father. He also was entered in the Clubman's TT by Chester Motor Club, riding a Triumph T100 for Hector Dugdale finishing in 32nd position.

After the 1952 TT when he finished 18th, to complement his growing home short-circuit experience, Perris spent five weeks riding his KTT Velocette around Europe with some tools and a tent, competing in four races and riding from race to race.

In 1953, Perris sold both his old bikes to buy a new Triumph Grand Prix, winning his first race at Brands Hatch, with his growing experience enabling access to better machinery from established tuners-entrants John Viccars, Geoff Monty, Allen Dudley-Ward and Tom Kirby.

Perris was picked for the 1955 works AJS team at Ulster Grand Prix with a contract for 1956 but all British manufacturers discontinued their activities. John Viccars provided for 1957 a pair of Ray Petty tuned Manx Norton's which Perris rode for five years throughout Europe until finishing third in the 1961 500 cc World Championship.

== The middle years ==
In 1962, after being noticed due to his 1961 third-place, his big break came riding works Suzukis for five years until the Japanese manufacturers discontinued their racing after 1966.

Perris then retired to South Africa running a business for two years but, with a hankering to race, returned to England entering the 1968 TT riding Suzukis for Eddie Crooks and again for half a season in 1969. For 1971 Perris was provided with a new Yamaha TD2 by Lord Denbigh Rollo Fielding, with Suzuki GB providing a Suzuki Daytona 500 on which Perris claimed third place at the 1971 TT.

When planning his riding for 1972, after a chance meeting with Norton Chairman Dennis Poore, Perris was offered a position as Competitions Manager for Norton-Villiers, running a newly formed works Norton road race team – for the first time in ten years – based on Norton Commando road-engines in the Production and then-new F750 classes.

Contracted in December 1971, Perris had to build a team from scratch using riders Peter Williams, Phil Read, Mick Grant and Dave Croxford.

The team enjoyed some successes until 1974 when Norton-Villiers financially crashed.

== Death ==
Perris died on March 17, 2015, from a lengthy undisclosed illness, according to his daughter (although his long time friend and fellow racer Tommy Robb mentioned Alzheimer’s), with a funeral on April 1, 2015 at the Isle of Wight crematorium. He was 83.
