= 1962 Isle of Man TT =

Annual motorcycle racing event

The 1962 Isle of Man TT was a FIM event held on 4 June 1962 at the Snaefell Mountain Course. It was part of the 1962 Grand Prix motorcycle racing season.

== 1962 Isle of Man Lightweight TT 125cc final standings ==
3 Laps (113.00 Miles) Mountain Course.

Place	Rider	Number	Country	Machine	Speed	Time	Points
1	(Switzerland) Luigi Taveri		Switzerland	Honda	89.88 mph	1:15.34.2	8
2	(United Kingdom) Tommy Robb		United Kingdom	Honda	88.58 mph	1:16.40.6	6
3	(Australia) Tom Phillis		Australia	Honda	88.33 mph	1:16.55.0	4
4	(United Kingdom) Derek Minter		United Kingdom	Honda	87.24 mph	1:17.51.4	3
5	(Federation of Rhodesia and Nyasaland) Jim Redman		Rhodesia	Honda	85.29 mph	1:19.38.0	2
6	(United Kingdom) Rex Avery		United Kingdom	EMC	84.44 mph	1:20.26.6	1

== 1962 Sidecar TT final standings ==
3 Laps (113.00 Miles) Mountain Course.

Place	Rider	Number	Country	Machine	Speed	Time	Points
1	(United Kingdom) Chris Vincent		United Kingdom	BSA	83.57 mph	1:21.16.4	8
2	(West Germany) Otto Kolle		West Germany	BMW	82.93 mph	1:21.53.8	6
3	(United Kingdom) Colin Seeley		United Kingdom	Matchless	82.80 mph	1:21.01.8	4
4	(Switzerland) Claude Lambert		Switzerland	BMW	81.55 mph	1:23.17.6	3
5	(West Germany) Heinz Luthringshauser		West Germany	BMW	71.90 mph	1:25.52.0	2
6	(West Germany) Georg Auerbacher		West Germany	BMW	77.79 mph	1:27.18.8	1

== 1962 Isle of Man Lightweight TT 250cc final standings ==
6 Laps (226.38 Miles) Mountain Course.

Place	Rider	Number	Country	Machine	Speed	Time	Points
1	(United Kingdom) Derek Minter		United Kingdom	Honda	96.98 mph	2:20.30.0	8
2	(Federation of Rhodesia and Nyasaland) Jim Redman		Rhodesia	Honda	95.54 mph	2:22.23.6	6
3	(Australia) Tom Phillis		Australia	Honda	92.87 mph	2:26.15.6	4
4	(United Kingdom) Arthur Wheeler		United Kingdom	Moto Guzzi	88.72 mph	2:33.06.6	3
5	(Italy) Alberto Pagani		Italy	Aermacchi	85.55 mph	2:38.47.0	2
6	(United Kingdom) Dan Shorey		United Kingdom	Bultaco	82.59 mph	2:44.29.4	1

== 1962 Isle of Man Junior TT 350cc final standings ==
6 Laps (236.38 Miles) Mountain Course.

Place	Rider	Number	Country	Machine	Speed	Time	Points
1	(United Kingdom) Mike Hailwood		United Kingdom	MV Agusta	99.59 mph	2:16.24.2	8
2	(Federation of Rhodesia and Nyasaland) Gary Hocking		Rhodesia	MV Agusta	99.52 mph	2:16.29.8	6
3	(Czechoslovakia) František Šťastný		Czechoslovakia	Jawa	94.74 mph	2:23.23.4	4
4	(United Kingdom) Roy Ingham		United Kingdom	Norton	94.46 mph	2:23.48.8	3
5	(Canada) Mike Duff		Canada	AJS	93.81 mph	2:24.47.8	2
6	(New Zealand) Hugh Anderson		New Zealand	AJS	92.97 mph	2:25.47.8	1

== 1962 50cc Ultra-Lightweight TT final standings ==
2 Laps (75.46 Miles) Mountain Course.

Place	Rider	Number	Country	Machine	Speed	Time	Points
1	(West Germany) Ernst Degner		West Germany	Suzuki	75.12 mph	1:00.16.4	8
2	(Switzerland) Luigi Taveri		Switzerland	Honda	74.75 mph	1:00.34.4	6
3	(United Kingdom) Tommy Robb		United Kingdom	Honda	74.48 mph	1:00.47.6	4
4	(West Germany) Hans-Georg Anscheidt		West Germany	Kreidler	74.32 mph	1:00.55.4	3
5	(Japan) Mitsuo Itoh		Japan	Suzuki	73.02 mph	1:02.00.4	2
6	(Japan) M.Ichino		Japan	Suzuki	73.00 mph	1:02.01.4	1

- Fastest Lap; Ernst Degner 29 minutes 58.6 seconds, 75.72 mph.

== 1962 Isle of Man Senior TT 500cc final standings ==
6 Laps (236.38 Miles) Mountain Course.

Place	Rider	Number	Country	Machine	Speed	Time	Points
1	(Federation of Rhodesia and Nyasaland) Gary Hocking		Rhodesia	MV Agusta	103.51 mph	2:11.13.4	8
2	(United Kingdom) Ellis Boyce		United Kingdom	Norton	96.27 mph	2:21.06.2	6
3	(United Kingdom) Fred Stevens		United Kingdom	Norton	96.24 mph	2:21.09.4	4
4	(Austria) Bert Schneider		Austria	Norton	95.85 mph	2:21.43.8	3
5	(United Kingdom) Roy Ingham		United Kingdom	Norton	95.54 mph	2:22.20.8	2
6	(United Kingdom) Brian Setchell		United Kingdom	Norton	94.64 mph	2:23.32.6	1

== See also ==
- Beryl Swain
