= Alberto Gandossi =

Italian motorcycle racer (born 1933)

- Nationality: Italian
Motorcycle racing career statistics
Grand Prix motorcycle racing
Active years	1958, 1960
First race	1958 125cc Dutch TT
Last race	1960 125cc Dutch TT
First win	1958 125cc Belgian Grand Prix
Last win	1958 125cc Swedish Grand Prix
Team	Ducati
Starts / Wins / Podiums / Poles / F. laps / Points; 6 / 2 / 4 / 0 / 2 / 29

Alberto Gandossi (born 31 January 1933) was an Italian Grand Prix motorcycle road racer. His best year was in 1958 when he rode a Ducati to two Grand Prix victories and finished second to Carlo Ubbiali in the 125cc world championship.

== Biography ==
As for the World Championship competitions, Gandossi raced in the 1958 season in the 125 class riding a Ducati, winning two Grand Prix races and scoring a total of 28 points (25 after discarding his worst result; the rather complex rules stipulated that only the best four results were valid that year, so Gandossi had to discard one) and finishing second in the overall standings behind Carlo Ubbiali.

Two years later, Gandossi competed again in the same class riding an MZ and took third place in the Dutch TT.

But even before competing in the World Championship, Gandossi had gained experience as a Ducati rider in other famous races of the time, such as the Milan-Taranto, where he was class winner in 1956, and the Motogiro d'Italia, which he also won in his class that same year.
