= Hugh Anderson (motorcyclist) =

New Zealand motorcycle racer (born 1936)

Hugh Anderson MBE
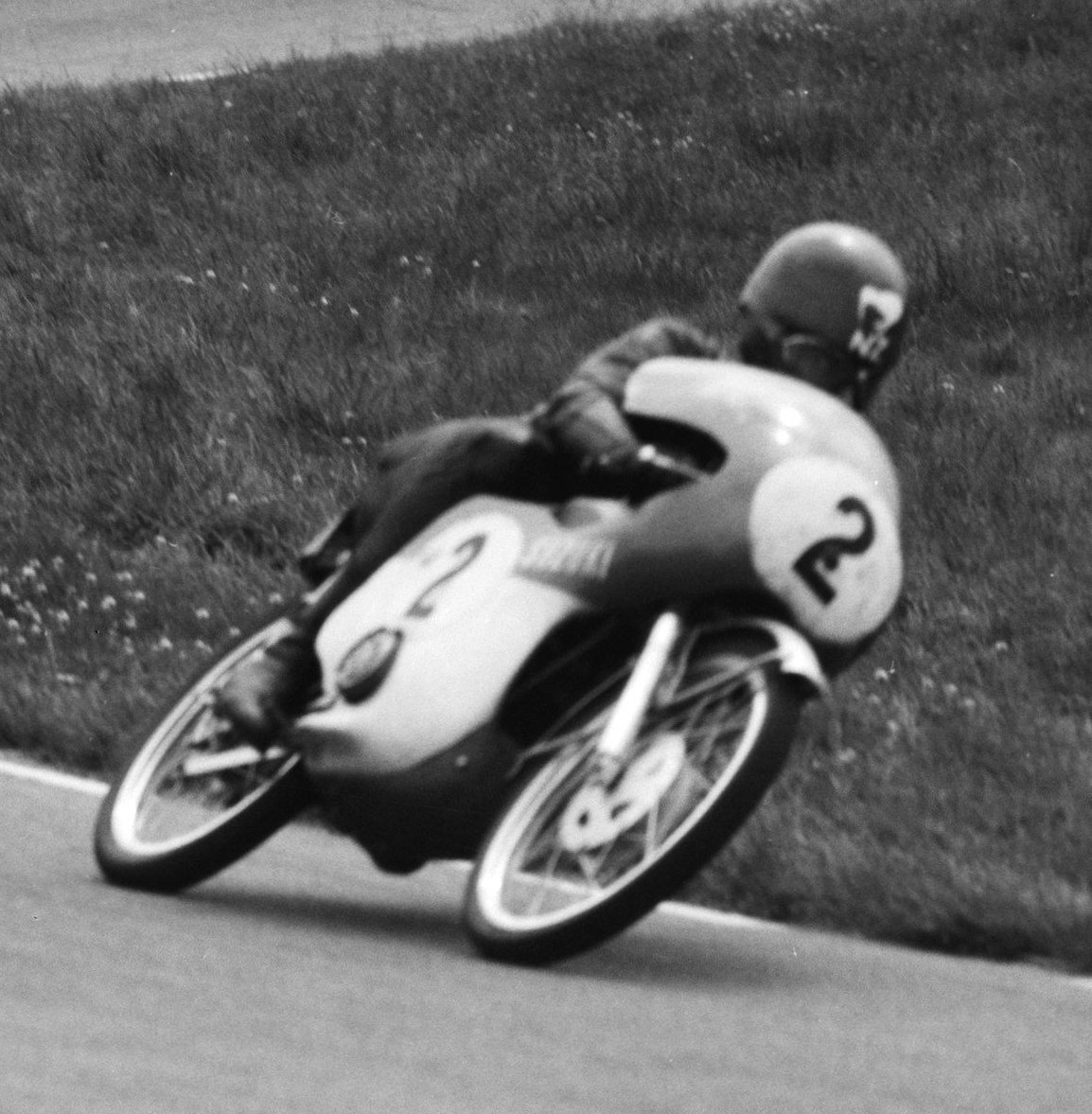
- Anderson at the 1963 Dutch TT
- Nationality: New Zealander
- Born: 18 January 1936 (age 90); Huntly, New Zealand
Motorcycle racing career statistics
Grand Prix motorcycle racing
Active years	1960-1966
First race	1960 350cc Isle of Man TT
Last race	1966 50cc Japanese Grand Prix
First win	1962 50cc Argentine Grand Prix
Last win	1965 125cc Japanese Grand Prix
Team	Suzuki
Championships	50 cc - 1963, 1964 125 cc - 1963, 1965
Starts / Wins / Podiums / Poles / F. laps / Points; 68 / 25 / 48 / 0 / 21
Isle of Man TT career
TTs contested	7 (1960 - 1966)
TT wins	2
First TT win	1963 Lightweight 125 TT
Last TT win	1964 Ultra-Lightweight TT
TT podiums	6

Hugh Robertson Anderson MBE (born 18 January 1936) is a four-time Grand Prix motorcycle road racing World Champion and a 19-time New Zealand national champion. He is also a two-time Isle of Man TT winner. In 2022, the F.I.M. inducted Anderson into the MotoGP Legends club.

== Motorcycle racing career ==
Growing up in Huntly, Anderson played rugby league for Huntly United alongside fellow future motorcycle champion Ginger Molloy.

Anderson received support for his racing activities from Rod Coleman, the Suzuki importer for New Zealand and former Grand Prix racer who won the 1954 Isle of Man Junior TT. He joined the Suzuki factory racing team in 1961, racing the factory's 50cc, 125cc and occasionally 250cc racers. During his team membership, Anderson was double World Champion (50cc and 125cc) in 1963 and retained his 50cc World Title the following year. In 1965, he was crowned 125cc World Championship on his factory Suzuki. Anderson's last race for the Suzuki factory was at the 1966 Japanese Grand Prix at Fisco in October 1966.

In the 1994 Queen's Birthday Honours, Anderson was appointed a Member of the Order of the British Empire, for services to motor sport. In 1995, he was inducted into the New Zealand Sports Hall of Fame.

== Motorcycle Grand Prix results ==
Position	1	2	3	4	5	6
Points	8	6	4	3	2	1

(key) (Races in italics indicate fastest lap)

Year	Class	Team	1	2	3	4	5	6	7	8	9	10	11	12	13	Points	Rank	Wins
1960	350cc	AJS	FRA -	IOM; NC	NED -			ULS; 3	NAT; 6							5	7th	0
1960	500cc	Norton	FRA; 7	IOM; NC	NED -	BEL -	GER -	ULS -	NAT -							0	-	0
1961	250cc	Suzuki	ESP -	GER -	FRA -	IOM; 10	NED -	BEL -	DDR -	ULS -	NAT -	SWE -	ARG -			0	-	0
1961	350cc	Norton		GER -		IOM; 7	NED -		DDR -	ULS -	NAT; NC	SWE -				0	-	0
1961	500cc	Norton		GER -	FRA -	IOM; NC	NED -	BEL -	DDR -	ULS -	NAT -	SWE -	ARG -			0	-	0
1962	50cc	Suzuki	ESP -	FRA -	IOM -	NED -	BEL -	GER -		DDR; 3	NAT; 4	FIN; 6	ARG; 1			16	7th	1
1962	125cc	Suzuki	ESP -	FRA -	IOM; NC	NED -	BEL -	GER; NC	ULS; NC	DDR -	NAT -	FIN -	ARG; 1			11	7th	1
1962	350cc	AJS			IOM -	NED; 6			ULS -	DDR -	NAT -	FIN -				1	14th	0
1962	500cc	Matchless			IOM; NC	NED -	BEL -		ULS -	DDR -	NAT -	FIN -	ARG -			0	-	0
1963	50cc	Suzuki	ESP; 2	GER; 1	FRA -	IOM; 2	NED; 2	BEL; 4			FIN; 3		ARG; 1	JPN; 2		34	1st	2
1963	125cc	Suzuki	ESP -	GER; 2	FRA; 1	IOM; 1	NED; 1	BEL; 2	ULS; 1	DDR; 1	FIN; 1	NAT -	ARG -	JPN; 5		54	1st	6
1964	50cc	Suzuki	USA; 1	ESP; 2	FRA; 1	IOM; 1	NED -	BEL; 3	GER -			FIN; 1		JPN -		38	1st	4
1964	125cc	Suzuki	USA; 1	ESP; 5	FRA -	IOM; NC	NED; 5		GER; NC	DDR; 1	ULS; 1	FIN -	NAT; 2	JPN; NC		34	3rd	3
1964	250cc	Suzuki	USA -	ESP; NC	FRA -	IOM -	NED -	BEL -	GER -	DDR -	ULS -		NAT -	JPN -		0	-	0
1965	50cc	Suzuki	USA; 2	GER; 3	ESP; 1	FRA; 6	IOM; 2	NED; 2	BEL; 2						JPN -	32	3rd	1
1965	125cc	Suzuki	USA; 1	GER; 1	ESP; 1	FRA; 1	IOM; 5	NED; 3		DDR -	CZE; NC	ULS -	FIN; 1	NAT; 1	JPN; 1	56	1st	7
1966	50cc	Suzuki	ESP; 4	GER; 3	NED; 3					IOM; 3	NAT; 4	JPN; 3				16	4th	0
1966	125cc	Suzuki	ESP -	GER -	NED; 4	DDR -	CZE; 4	FIN; 4	ULS; 5	IOM; 3	NAT -	JPN -				15	5th	0
