= Florian Camathias =

- Camathias demonstrating the kneeling riding position on an unfinished race-replica, a road-version BMW pushrod-engined motorcycle and sidecar configuration, known as kneeler, which he was famously associated with in 500 cc Grand Prix racing using the BMW RS54 Rennsport overhead camshaft competition engine.
- Nationality: (Switzerland) Swiss
- Born: 23 March 1924; San Gallo
- Died: 10 October 1965 (aged 41); Brands Hatch, Kent, England
Motorcycle racing career statistics
Grand Prix motorcycle racing
Active years	1953 - 1965
First win	1958 Dutch TT
Isle of Man TT career
TTs contested	9, 1957-1965
TT wins	1
First TT win	1963
Last TT win	1963
TT podiums	4, 1957, third place 1958, second place 1959, second place

Florian Camathias (23 March 1924 – 10 October 1965) was a Swiss professional Grand Prix motorcycle and sidecar racer.

Born in Wittenbach, St. Gallen in the canton of St. Gallen in Switzerland, Camathias owned a garage Veytaux, near Montreux.

== Race career ==
Camathias began his motorcycle racing career in 1945. Camathias placed fifth in the World Sidecar Championship in 1956. In 1957, he entered his first Isle of Man TT, finishing in ninth place in the Lightweight 250 event on an NSU solo motorcycle, and in third place in the Sidecar TT driving a BMW.

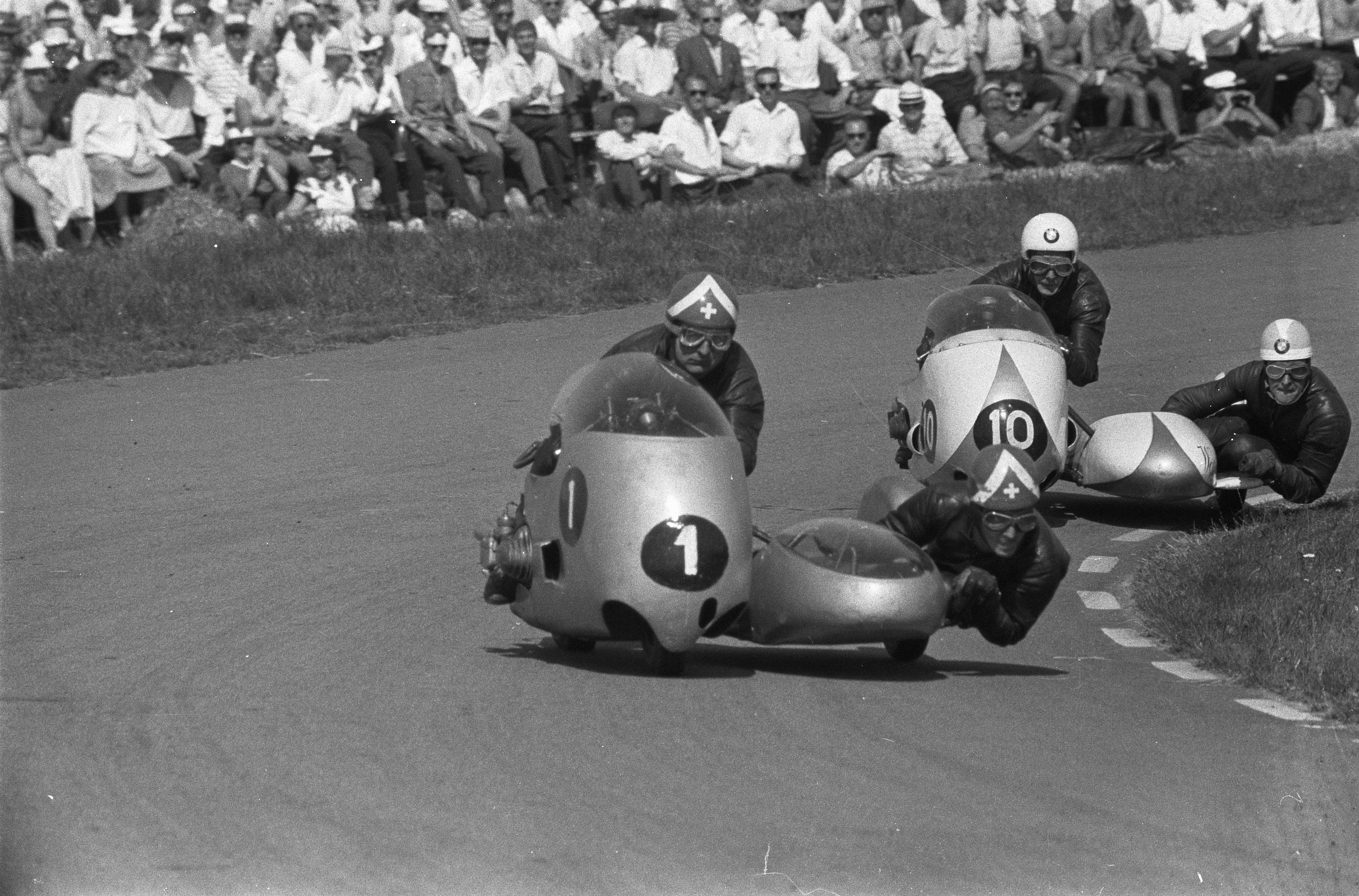
Camathias with passenger Roland Föll at the 1960 Assen TT

Camathias won his first Grand Prix victory in the 1958 Dutch TT at Assen. He also finished as runner-up position in the British Sidecar Championship. Repeating the achievements in 1959, he was Swiss and British Champion in 1960 and once again finished fifth in the World Championship.

Camathias crashed in the 1962 Sidecar TT, a race won by English racer Chris Vincent with a BSA-engined outfit. Camathias won his one and only TT at the 1963 races.

Camathias was a renowned engine builder associated with the desirable BMW RS54 Rennsport overhead camshaft competition engine, and began an association with English sidecar racer Colin Seeley, who used Camathias' engine for the 1964 Sidecar TT, placing third on a machine he dubbed as FCSB — Florian Camathias Special 'B', whilst Camathias finished 15th in the same race using a Gilera engine.

== Death ==
Camathias died after crashing during a race at Brands Hatch, Kent, England, on 10 October 1965. His passenger, Franz Ducret, was injured but recovered in West Hill Hospital, Dartford, Kent.

An inquest, presided over by Coroner for North Kent, Col. W.H. Harris, found that the crash was caused by welding failure where a front-fork tube had broken-away, and recorded a verdict of misadventure. Around 1,000 people attended the funeral with many from the motorcycle and car racing fraternity.

== Legacy ==
A European sidecar classic racing series was established named Camathias Cup Championship with classes for two engine capacities, under 750 cc and over 750 cc, with winners decided on the overall highest points score in each class. In 2015, 45 teams participated achieving full grids in five countries, including a 2-race short road-course event on the Billown Circuit at the Pre-TT races, part the Isle of Man race festival.

== Family connections ==
Camathias was the uncle to Romeo Camathias, a car racer born in 1947, whose son Joël Camathias is also a car racer.
