= Bob Brown (motorcyclist) =

Australian motorcycle racer

- Brown in 1959
- Nationality: Australian
- Born: 9 May 1930; Sydney, Australia
- Died: 23 July 1960 (aged 30); Stuttgart, West Germany
Motorcycle racing career statistics
Grand Prix motorcycle racing
| Active years | 1955 – 1960 |
| First race | 1955 500cc Dutch TT |
| Last race | 1960 350cc Dutch TT |
Starts / Wins / Podiums / Poles / F. laps / Points; 28 / 0 / 13 / N/A / N/A / 66

Robert N. Brown (9 May 1930 in Sydney – 23 July 1960 at Solituderennen) was an Australian professional Grand Prix motorcycle road racer. His best season was in 1959 when he finished in third place in both the 350cc and 500cc world championships. Brown was killed during practice for the 1960 West German Grand Prix.

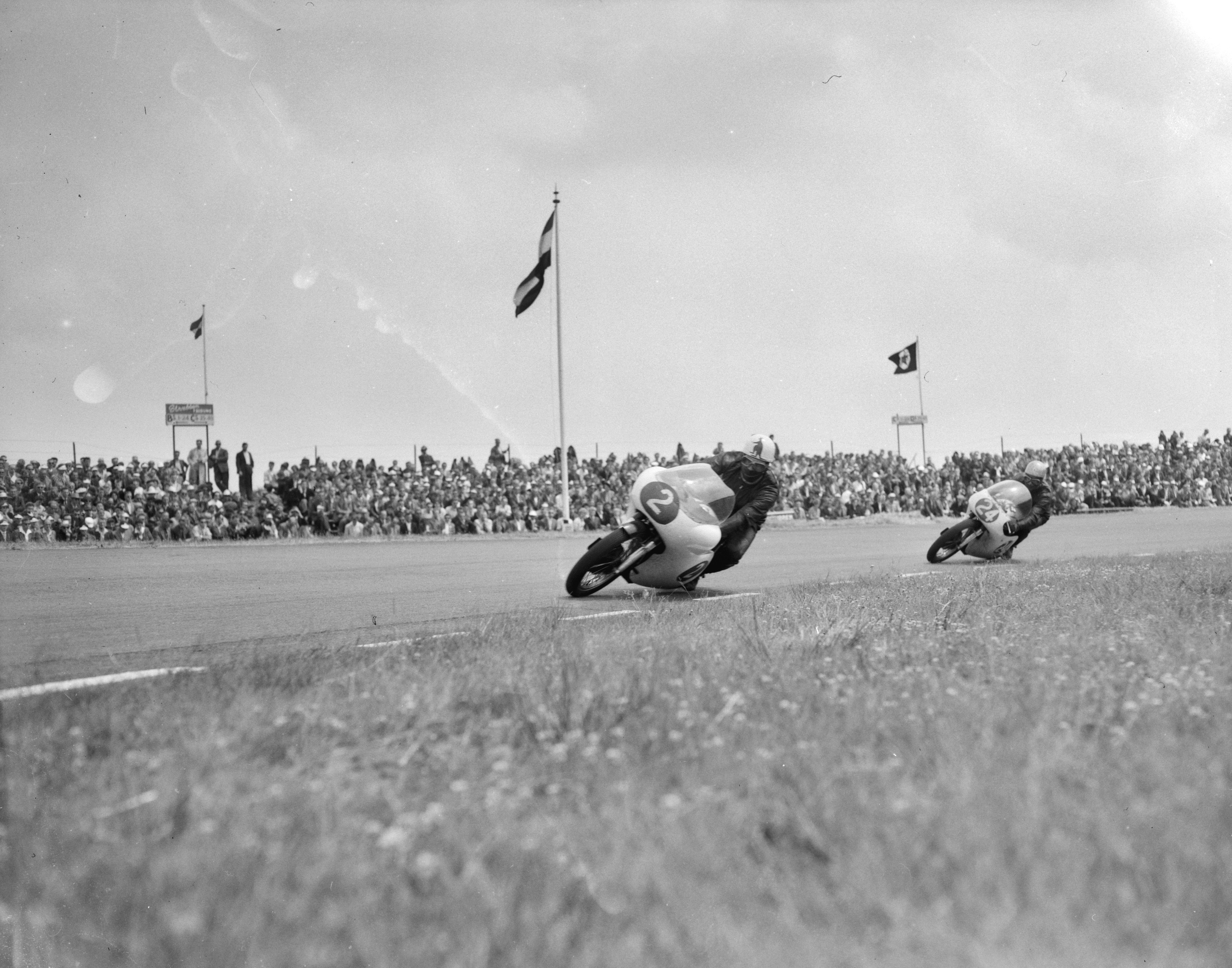
Brown en route to a victory in the 1959 350cc Dutch TT.
