= Helmut Fath =

German motorcycle racer

- Helmut Fath wearing the race winner's garland
- Nationality: German
- Born: 24 May 1929; Ursenbach, Germany
- Died: 19 June 1993 (aged 64); Heidelberg, Germany
Motorcycle racing career statistics
Grand Prix motorcycle racing
Active years	1956 - 1969
First race	1956 Belgian Sidecar Grand Prix
Last race	1969 Belgian Grand Prix
First win	1960 French Sidecar Grand Prix
Last win	1969 Belgian Sidecar Grand Prix
Team	BMW URS
Championships	2 (1960, 1968)
Starts / Wins / Podiums / Poles / F. laps / Points; / 11 / / N/A / N/A
Isle of Man TT career
TTs contested	6 (1958 - 1969)
TT wins	1
First TT win	1960 Sidecar TT
Last TT win	1960 Sidecar TT
TT podiums	2

Helmut Fath (24 May 1929 – 19 June 1993) was a German sidecar racer and engineer. He won the Sidecar World Championship in 1960 and 1968. His early racing was on BMW R50 sidecars with a chassis of his own design. After a bad accident in 1961, he took time off and returned with his own design URS four-cylinder machine to win the title in 1968. The URS engine was also used in solo competition as well as powering Horst Owesle/Peter Rutterford to the 1971 World Sidecar Championship.

Sporting positions
Preceded by Walter Schneider with Hans Strauß	World Sidecar Champion with Alfred Wohlgemuth; 1960	Succeeded by Max Deubel with Emil Hörner
Preceded by Klaus Enders with Ralf Engelhardt	World Sidecar Champion with Wolfgang Kalauch; 1968	Succeeded by Klaus Enders with Ralf Engelhardt
