= Dickie Dale =

British motorcycle racer

- Nationality: (United Kingdom) British
- Born: 25 April 1927; Frampton, England
- Died: 30 April 1961 (aged 34); Bonn, West Germany
Motorcycle racing career statistics
Grand Prix motorcycle racing
Active years	1949-1950, 1953 – 1960
First race	1949 250cc Isle of Man TT
Last race	1960 350cc Nations Grand Prix
First win	1954 500cc Spanish Grand Prix
Last win	1955 350cc Nations Grand Prix
Team(s)	Benelli, Gilera, Moto Guzzi, MV Agusta
Championships	0
Starts / Wins / Podiums / Poles / F. laps / Points; 41 / 2 / 12 / 0 / 2 / 123

Richard H. Dale (25 April 1927 – 30 April 1961), known as Dickie Dale, was a Grand Prix motorcycle road racer born in Wyberton near Boston, Lincolnshire, England. In 1945, he was drafted into the RAF and served as a flight mechanic, and bought his first motorcycle, a 1939 AJS Silver Streak, while stationed at RAF Cranwell.

Dale competed in the inaugural 1949 Grand Prix motorcycle racing season. He was a victor in the 1951 North West 200. His best seasons were 1955 and 1956 when he finished in second place in the 350cc world championship, both times behind his Moto Guzzi teammate Bill Lomas. He was also a two-time winner of the prestigious pre-season Mettet Grand Prix invitational race (1957, 1960).

Dale also competed in the 500cc class aboard Moto Guzzi's famous V8 Grand Prix bike. He died on the way to hospital in a helicopter, after crashing during the 1961 Eifelrennen race at the Nürburgring in West Germany.
