= Jacques Insermini =

French stuntman and actor (1927–2024)

- Born: Jacques Émile Edmond Insermini; 24 October 1927; Paris, France
- Died: 6 June 2024 (aged 96); Paris, France
- Occupations: Stuntman, actor

Jacques Émile Edmond Insermini (24 October 1927 – 6 June 2024) was a French stuntman, actor, and motorcyclist. In the 1970s, he primarily worked in erotic and pornographic cinema.

== Biography ==
Born in the 18th arrondissement of Paris on 24 October 1927, Insermini starting his career in motorcycle racing and weightlifting. From 1951 to 1962, he raced in the French motorcycle championships, which he won several times. At the end of the 1960s, he began his acting career with small roles in theatre. He also acted in B movies in Germany. In the 1970s, he became a pornographic actor and took on the pseudonyms Bruno Kohls, Jacques Inzermini, and Jacques Leviec. He was active until 1985. He played the role of a cowboy in the 1977 film Délires porno.

Insermini died in Paris on 6 June 2024, at the age of 96.

== Motorcycle awards ==
- Champion of France (1960, 1961, 1962)

== Filmography ==
=== Film ===
- Le Dingue (1973)
- Chinese in Paris (1974)
- The Man from Chicago (1975)
- Hippopotamours (1976)
- Marche pas sur mes lacets (1977)
- Trois filles dans le vent (1981)
- Ninja Strikes Back (1982)
- Fire under the Skin (1985)

=== Television ===
- À la bonne étoile (1966)
- Ne fais pas ça Isabella (1967)
- Jean Pinot, médecin aujourd'hui (1973)

=== X-rated films ===
- L'insatisfaite (1972)
- The Felines (1972)
- Pénélope, folle de son corps (1973)
- Le journal érotique d'un bûcheron (1973)
- Dossier érotique d'un notaire (1973)
- Les confidences d'un lit trop accueillant (1973)
- The Adulteress (1975)
- Femmes impudiques (1975)
- Indécences (1975)
- Candy's Candy (1975)
- Porn's Girls (1976)
- Weekends of a Perverted Couple (1976)
- Perversions (1976)
- Langue de velours (1976)
- Mes nuits avec... Alice, Pénélope, Arnold, Maud et Richard (1976)
- Luxure (1986)
- Pornographique suédoise (1976)
- Shocking! (1976)
- Le bouche-trou (1976)
- Parties raides (1976)
- Délires porno (1977)
- Prends-moi de force (1978)
- Règlement de femmes à O.Q. Corral (1978)
- Soirées prives (1979)
