= John Hempleman =

New Zealand motorcycle racer (1933–2019)

- Born: John Giles Hempleman; 22 April 1933
- Died: 19 August 2019 (aged 86)
Motorcycle racing career statistics
Grand Prix motorcycle racing
Active years	1959–1960
First race	1959 350cc West German Grand Prix
Last race	1960 500cc West German Grand Prix
Starts / Wins / Podiums / Poles / F. laps / Points; 11 / 0 / 1 / N/A / N/A / 26

John Giles Hempleman (22 April 1933 – 19 August 2019) was a Grand Prix motorcycle road racer from New Zealand. He had his best season in 1960 when he won the 250cc and 500cc classes at the East German Grand Prix, a non-championship race, and finished the year in fifth place in the 125cc world championship.
