= Libero Liberati =

Italian motorcycle racer (1926–1962)

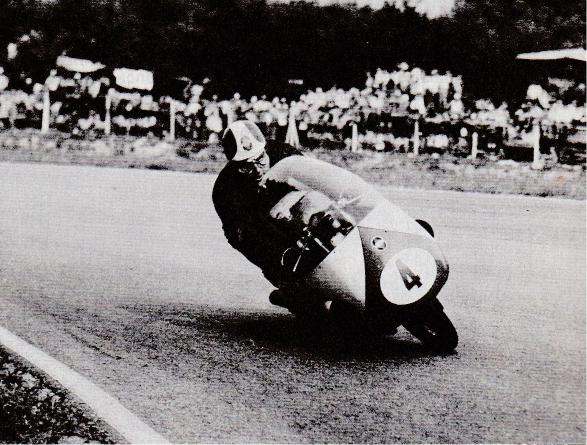
- Liberati racing in 1957
- Nationality: Italian
- Born: 20 September 1926; Terni, Kingdom of Italy
- Died: 5 March 1962 (aged 35); Terni, Italy
Motorcycle racing career statistics
Grand Prix motorcycle racing
Active years	1952–1953, 1955 – 1957, 1959
First race	1952 500cc Swiss Grand Prix
Last race	1959 250cc West German Grand Prix
First win	1956 350cc Nations Grand Prix
Last win	1957 500cc Nations Grand Prix
Team(s)	Gilera, Morini
Championships	500cc- 1957
Starts / Wins / Podiums / Poles / F. laps / Points; 15 / 6 / 14 / N/A / 3 / 741

Libero Liberati (20 September 1926 – 5 March 1962) was an Italian professional motorcycle road racer. He competed in the FIM Grand Prix motorcycle racing world championships from 1952 to 1959, most prominently as a member of the Gilera factory racing team where he won the 1957 500cc world championships.

Liberati was born in Terni. He became famous in his country, winning the Italian championship in 1948. Two years later, Moto Guzzi called him to race in the 500cc World Championship, where he took part in a single race. The same happened the following year with Gilera. Liberati scored his first points in the World Championship in 1953, and his first race victory came in 1956 in the 350cc class.

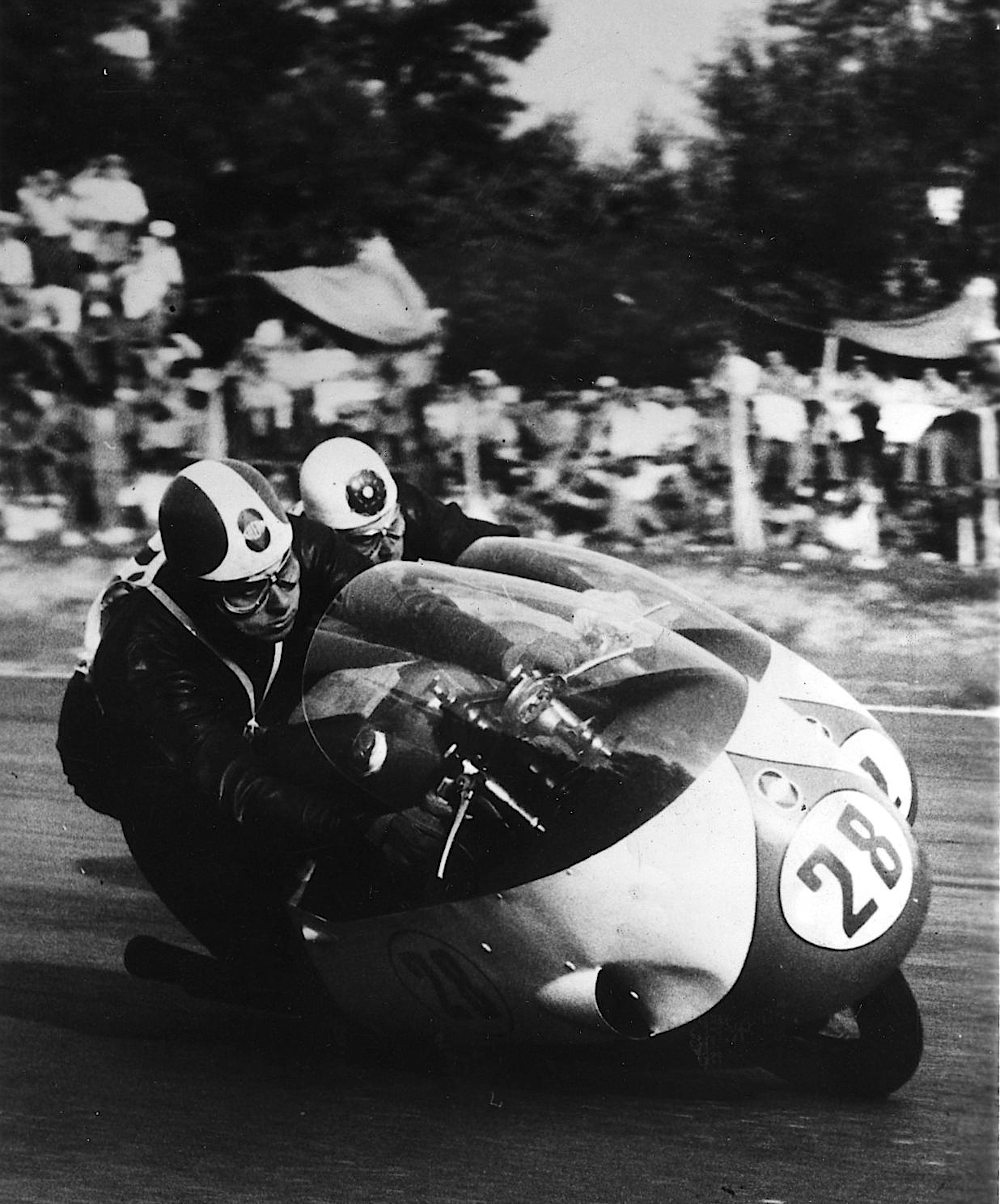
Gilera's Liberati (28) and Geoff Duke negotiate La Curva Grande at Monza during the 1956 Nations Grand Prix.

In 1957, Liberati won the 500cc World Championship, scoring a total of four victories. He also won a race in the 350cc class. However, at the end of the season, a dispute with the Gilera factory left him without a ride. Two years later Moto Morini gave him the opportunity to race again, this time in the 250cc class.

On 5 March 1962, Liberati died from an accident during a training session on the Strada statale 209 Valnerina, violently hitting his head after slipping on the wet road.

== Motorcycle Grand Prix results ==
Points system from 1950 to 1968
Position	Points
1	8
2	6
3	4
4	3
5	2
6	1

(key) (Races in italics indicate fastest lap)

Year	Class	Team	1	2	3	4	5	6	7	8	9	Points	Rank	Wins
1952	500cc	Gilera	SUI; 7	IOM -	NED; 8	BEL -	GER -	ULS -	NAT; 8	ESP -		0	—	0
1953	500cc	Gilera	IOM -	NED -	BEL -	GER -	FRA -	ULS -	SUI -	NAT; 3	ESP -	4	12th	0
1955	500cc	Gilera	ESP -	FRA; 2	IOM -	GER -	BEL -	NED -	ULS -	NAT -		6	7th	0
1956	350cc	Gilera	IOM -	NED -	BEL -	GER -	ULS -	NAT; 1				8	7th	1
1956	500cc	Gilera	IOM -	NED -	BEL -	GER -	ULS -	NAT; 2				6	8th	0
1957	350cc	Gilera	GER; 1	IOM -	NED; 3	BEL; 2	ULS; 3	NAT; 3				22	2nd	1
1957	500cc	Gilera	GER; 1	IOM -	NED; 2	BEL; 1	ULS; 1	NAT; 1				32	1st	4
1959	250cc	Moto Morini	IOM -	GER; 4	NED -	BEL -	SWE -	ULS -	NAT -			3	12th	0

Preceded by John Surtees	500cc Motorcycle World Champion; 1957	Succeeded by John Surtees
