= John Hartle =

British motorcycle racer

- John Hartle with his hometown's coat of arms helmet emblem
- Nationality: British
- Born: 22 December 1933; Chapel-en-le-Frith, Derbyshire, England
- Died: 31 August 1968 (aged 34); Scarborough, England
Motorcycle racing career statistics
Grand Prix motorcycle racing
Active years	1955 – 1968
First race	1955 350cc Isle of Man TT
Last race	1968 500cc Ulster Grand Prix
First win	1956 500cc Ulster Grand Prix
Last win	1963 500cc Dutch TT
Team(s)	Norton, MV Agusta
Starts / Wins / Podiums / Poles / F. laps / Points; 45 / 5 / 34 / N/A / 2 / 204

John Hartle (22 December 1933 – 31 August 1968) was an English professional road racer who competed in national, international and Grand Prix motorcycle events.

== Motorcycling career ==
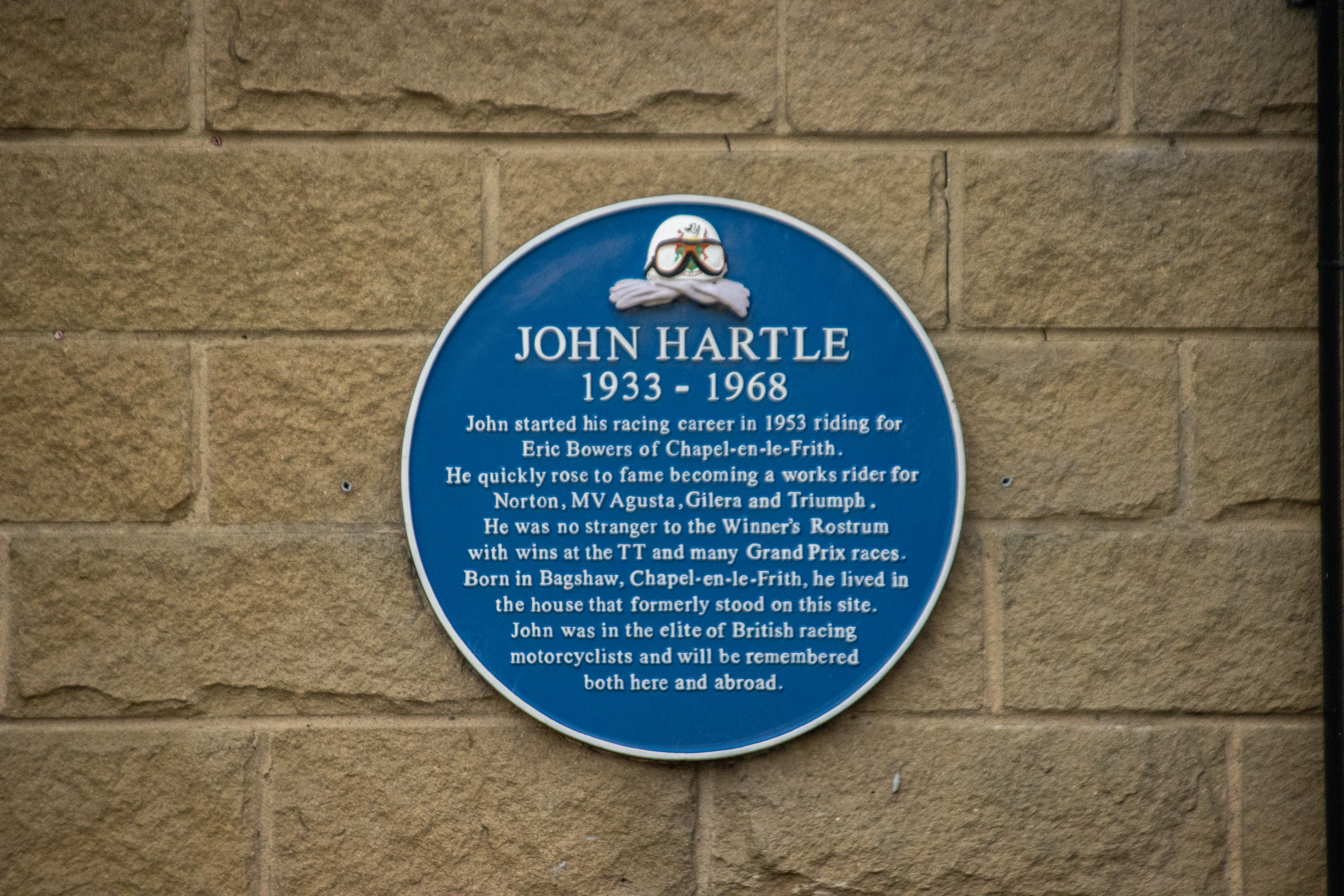
Hartle has a blue plaque in Chapel-en-le-Frith.

Born in Chapel-en-le-Frith, Derbyshire, Hartle began racing in 1952 when working for Eric Bowers Motorcycles, riding a BSA Gold Star at Brough Aerodrome, in the East Riding of Yorkshire, England. Gaining more experience at other nearby short circuits including Cadwell Park and Oulton Park in 1953, he also finished in three out of four races entered in the 1953 and 1954 Isle of Man Manx Grand Prix.

Hartle rode for the works Norton team during the 1955 season and again in 1956 in what would be factory team's last year in Grand Prix racing, returning to ride for Eric Bowers in 1957.

MV Agusta signed Hartle in 1958 at the urging of John Surtees. He ended the season as runner-up to Surtees in the 500 and 350 classes. In 1960 he won his first Isle of Man TT race, the Junior TT event. After being released by MV Agusta, he then rode for Geoff Duke's privateer Gilera team, alongside Derek Minter.

In his early career, Hartle was sponsored for non-championship races by Eric W Bowers Coaches and later Comerfords, a large London retailer of roadgoing and sporting motorcycles, until his retirement in 1964.

Hartle returned to racing during 1967, winning the Isle of Man inaugural Production Race 750 category for road-based machines on a Triumph Thruxton Bonneville, and scoring World Championship points in both 350 cc and 500 cc races.

Hartle was killed in 1968 after crashing at the Oliver's Mount circuit in Scarborough.

Hartle was proud of his connection with his hometown of Chapel-en-le-Frith, always carrying the coat of arms as his 'pudding basin' helmet emblem with the Latin motto Cava et Spera, which translates to 'Caution and Hope'. He was recognised in his hometown in 2010 by a blue wall-plaque attached to the building which now stands where he used to live.

== John Hartle Trophy ==
The John Hartle Trophy is an annual award at the Isle of Man TT Races. The trophy is presented to the winner of the Superstock TT.

== Motorcycle Grand Prix results ==
**Position**	1	2	3	4	5	6
**Points**	8	6	4	3	2	1

(key) (Races in bold indicate pole position; races in italics indicate fastest lap)

Year	Class	Team	1	2	3	4	5	6	7	8	9	10	11	Points	Rank	Wins
1955	350cc	Norton		FRA -	IOM; 6	GER -	BEL -	NED -	ULS; 2	NAT -				7	9th	0
1955	500cc	Norton	ESP -	FRA -	IOM; 13	GER -	BEL -	NED -	ULS; 2	NAT -				6	7th	0
1956	350cc	Norton	IOM; 3	NED -	BEL -	GER -	ULS; 3	NAT -						8	8th	0
1956	500cc	Norton	IOM; 2	NED -	BEL -	GER -	ULS; 1	NAT -						14	**3rd**	1
1957	250cc	MV Agusta	GER -	IOM -	NED -	BEL; 1	ULS -	NAT -						8	5th	1
1957	350cc	Norton	GER; 2	IOM; NC	NED; 6	BEL -	ULS; 4	NAT; 6						11	5th	0
1958	350cc	MV Agusta	IOM; NC	NED; 2	BEL; 2	GER; 2	SWE -	ULS; 2	NAT; 2					24	**2nd**	0
1958	500cc	MV Agusta	IOM; NC	NED; 2	BEL; 3	GER; 2	SWE -	ULS; 3	NAT -					20	**2nd**	0
1959	350cc	MV Agusta	FRA; 3	IOM; 2	GER -		BEL -	SWE; 2	ULS -	NAT -				16	**2nd**	0
1959	500cc	MV Agusta	FRA -	IOM; NC	GER -	NED -	BEL -		ULS -	NAT -				0	–	0
1960	350cc	MV Agusta	FRA -	IOM; 1	NED -			ULS; 2	NAT; 3					18	**3rd**	1
1960	500cc	Norton	FRA -	IOM; 2	NED -	BEL; 8	GER -	ULS; 1	NAT; 5					16	**3rd**	1
1961	250cc	Honda	ESP -	GER -	FRA -	IOM -	NED -	BEL; NC	DDR -	ULS; NC	NAT; NC	SWE -	ARG -	0	–	0
1963	350cc	Gilera	GER -	IOM; 2	NED -	BEL -	ULS -	DDR -	FIN -	NAT -		JPN -		6	6th	0
1963	500cc	Gilera		IOM; 2	NED; 1	BEL -	ULS; 2	DDR -	FIN -	NAT -	ARG -			20	**3rd**	1
1964	500cc	Norton	USA; 3	IOM -	NED -	BEL -	GER -	DDR -	ULS -	FIN -	NAT -			4	14th	0
1967	350cc	Aermacchi	GER -	IOM; 7	NED -		DDR -	CZE -		ULS -	NAT -		JPN -	0	–	0
1967	500cc	Matchless	GER -	IOM; 6	NED -	BEL -	DDR; 2	CZE; 5		ULS; 2	NAT; 6	CAN -		22	**3rd**	0
1967	500cc	Norton							FIN; 2					22	**3rd**	0
1968	500cc	Metisse	GER -	ESP -	IOM; NC	NED -	BEL -	DDR -	CZE -	FIN -	ULS; 3	NAT -		4	16th	0
