= Tarquinio Provini =

Italian motorcycle racer (1933–2005)

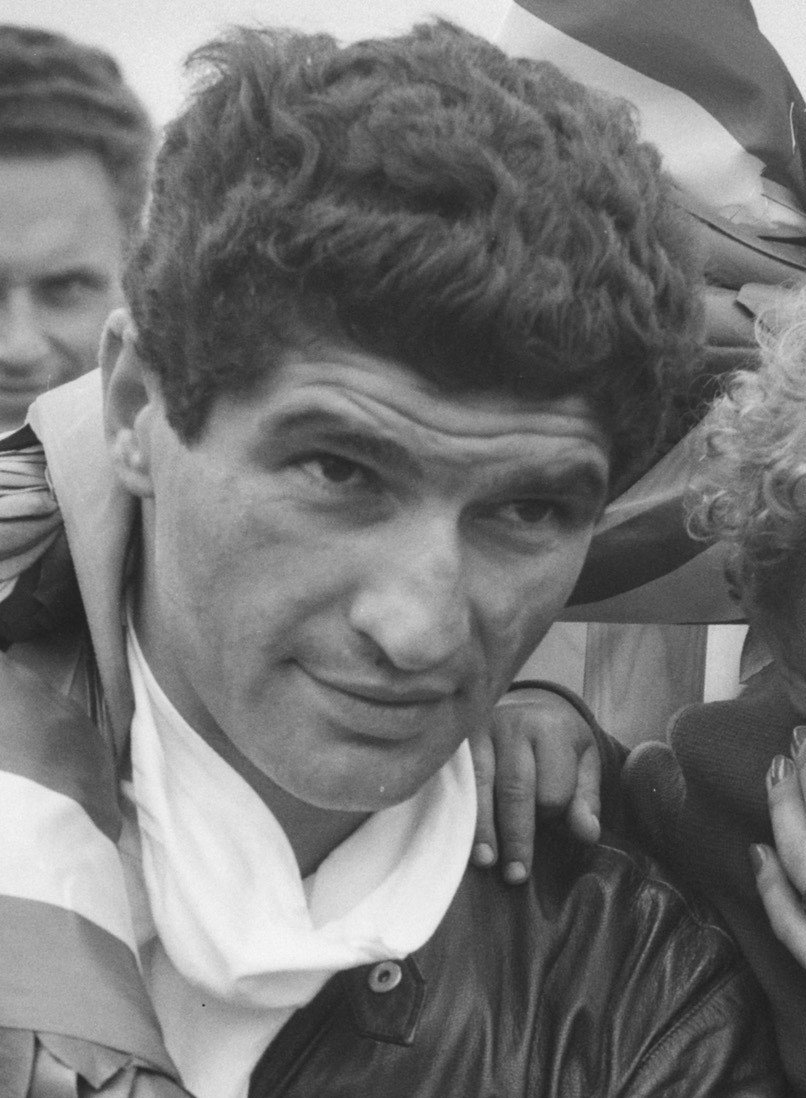
- Provini at the Dutch TT in 1959
- Nationality: Italian
- Born: 29 May 1933; Roveleto di Cadeo, Emilia-Romagna, Kingdom of Italy
- Died: 6 January 2005 (aged 71); Bologna, Italy
Motorcycle racing career statistics
Grand Prix motorcycle racing
Active years	1954 - 1966
First race	1954 125cc Nations Grand Prix
Last race	1966 350cc West German Grand Prix
First win	1954 125cc Spanish Grand Prix
Last win	1965 250cc Nations Grand Prix
Team(s)	Mondial, MV Agusta, Moto Morini, Benelli, Kreidler
Championships	125cc - 1957 250cc - 1958
Starts / Wins / Podiums / Poles / F. laps / Points; 50 / 20 / 39 / N/A / 23 / 269

Tarquinio Provini (29 May 1933 – 6 January 2005) was an Italian professional Grand Prix motorcycle road racer. He was a two-time world champion in road racing. Provini was also a four-time Isle of Man TT winner and won 13 Italian national championships.

== Motorcycling career ==
Provini was born in Roveleto di Cadeo, Emilia-Romagna, the son of a garage owner, and grew up around engines and machinery. He began riding motorcycles at the age of ten. He began racing in 1949 despite being too young by using his uncle's name on his racing license. In 1954, he won the Motogiro of Italy. He moved up to the Grand Prix competition in the middle of the 1954 season and won the Spanish Grand Prix at the end of the year. He won the 1957 FIM 125cc World Championship riding for the Italian Mondial factory. In 1958, he won the 250cc World Championship for MV Agusta.

When MV Agusta quit racing in the smaller classes, Provini signed to race for the Moto Morini factory. In 1963 he waged a season-long battle with Honda's Jim Redman for the 250 world championship. Each rider won four races and the title wasn't decided until the final race in Japan, with Redman winning the championship over Provini by two points. In 1966, he suffered a serious crash at the Isle of Man TT that broke his back, forcing his retirement. Provini redirected his energies and co-founded the Protar company which specialized in making scale racing bike models outside Bologna. He died in Bologna in 2005.

== Motorcycle Grand Prix results ==
Position	1	2	3	4	5	6
Points	8	6	4	3	2	1

(key) (Races in italics indicate fastest lap)

Year	Class	Team	1	2	3	4	5	6	7	8	9	10	11	12	13	Points	Rank	Wins
1954	125cc	Mondial	IOM -	ULS -	NED -	GER -	NAT; 2	ESP; 1								14	4th	1
1955	125cc	Mondial	ESP -	FRA; 4	IOM; NC	GER -	NED -	NAT -								3	9th	0
1956	125cc	Mondial	IOM -	NED -	BEL -	GER; 3	ULS -	NAT; 2								10	4th	0
1957	125cc	Mondial	GER; 2	IOM; 1	NED; 1	BEL; 1	ULS; 2	NAT -								30	1st	3
1957	250cc	Mondial	GER -	IOM; NC	NED; 1	BEL -	ULS -	NAT; 1								16	2nd	2
1958	125cc	MV Agusta	IOM; NC	NED; 3	BEL; 3	GER; 2	SWE; 4	ULS -	NAT -							17	4th	0
1958	250cc	MV Agusta	IOM; 1	NED; 1	BEL -	GER; 1	SWE -	ULS; 1	NAT -							32	1st	4
1959	125cc	MV Agusta	IOM; 1	GER; 2	NED -	BEL; 2	SWE; 1	ULS -	NAT; 5							28	2nd	2
1959	250cc	MV Agusta	IOM; 1	GER -	NED; 1	BEL -	SWE -	ULS -	NAT -							16	2nd	2
1960	250cc	Moto Morini	IOM; 3	NED -	BEL -	GER -	ULS -	NAT -								4	9th	0
1961	250cc	Moto Morini	ESP -	GER; 3	FRA; 4	IOM -	NED -	BEL -	DDR -	ULS -	NAT; 4	SWE -	ARG -			10	6th	0
1962	250cc	Moto Morini	ESP -	FRA -	IOM -	NED; 3	BEL -	GER -	ULS -	DDR -	NAT; 2	ARG -				10	5th	0
1963	250cc	Moto Morini	ESP; 1	GER; 1	IOM -	NED; 3	BEL; 3	ULS; 2	DDR -	NAT; 1	ARG; 1	JPN; 4				42	2nd	4
1964	50cc	Kreidler	USA -	ESP -	FRA; 6	IOM; 8	NED -	BEL -	GER -			FIN -		JPN -		1	13th	0
1964	250cc	Benelli	USA -	ESP; 1	FRA -	IOM; NC	NED; 4	BEL; 5	GER; 5	DDR -	ULS -		NAT -	JPN -		15	5th	1
1965	250cc	Benelli	USA -	GER -	ESP -	FRA -	IOM; 4	NED -	BEL -	DDR -	CZE -	ULS -	FIN -	NAT; 1	JPN -	11	7th	1
1965	350cc	Benelli		GER -			IOM; NC	NED -		DDR -	CZE -	ULS -	FIN -	NAT; 3	JPN -	4	13th	0
1966	350cc	Benelli	GER; 2	FRA -	NED -	DDR -	CZE -	FIN -	ULS -	IOM -	NAT -	JPN -				6	11th	0
