= Keith Campbell (motorcyclist) =

Australian motorcycle racer

- Nationality: Australian
- Born: 2 October 1931; Melbourne, Australia
- Died: 13 July 1958 (aged 26); Cadours, France
Motorcycle racing career statistics
Grand Prix motorcycle racing
Active years	1950 – 1958
First race	1950 250cc Ulster Grand Prix
Last race	1958 350cc Belgian Grand Prix
First win	1957 350cc Dutch TT
Last win	1957 350cc Ulster Grand Prix
Team	Moto Guzzi
Championships	350cc – 1957
Starts / Wins / Podiums / Poles / F. laps / Points; 11 / 3 / 8 / 0 / 2 / 53

Keith Ronald Campbell (2 October 1931 – 13 July 1958) was an Australian professional motorcycle road racer. He competed in the FIM Grand Prix motorcycle racing world championships from 1950 to 1958.

Campbell grew up in the Melbourne suburb of Prahran with the ambition to be a champion racing motorcyclist. He became Australia's first motorcycling road racing world champion when he won the 1957 FIM 350cc world championship as a member of the Moto Guzzi factory racing team.

Campbell married Geraldine, the sister-in-law of Britain's championship rider Geoff Duke and came back to Australia on his honeymoon in December 1957. He returned to Europe as the star rider at the 500cc Grand Prix de Cadours near Toulouse in France. According to a newspaper report, in trials he had beaten all records for the circuit, lapping at 71.5 miles an hour. He was leading the race when he failed to round a bend known as Cox's Corner, crashed and was killed instantly. His cause of death was said to be a fractured skull. This same corner claimed the life of Frenchman Raymond Sommer in 1950 and the circuit is named in his honour. Campbell's wife Geraldine was watching the race from the pits but did not see the accident.

== Motorcycle Grand Prix results ==
Points system from 1950 to 1968

Position	1	2	3	4	5	6
Points	8	6	4	3	2	1

5 best results were counted up until 1955.

(key) (Races in italics indicate fastest lap)

Year	Class	Team	1	2	3	4	5	6	7	8	9	Points	Rank	Wins
1950	250cc	Excelsior	IOM -	SUI -	ULS; 6	NAT -						1	17th	0
1954	500cc	Norton	FRA -	IOM -	ULS -	BEL; 5	NED -	GER -	SUI -	NAT -	ESP -	2	19th	0
1955	350cc	Norton	FRA -	IOM -	GER; 9	BEL; 3	NED -	ULS -	NAT -			4	11th	0
1957	350cc	Moto Guzzi	GER -	IOM; 2	NED; 1	BEL; 1	ULS; 1	NAT -				30	1st	3
1957	500cc	Moto Guzzi	GER -	IOM; 5	NED -	BEL -	ULS -	NAT -				2	15th	0
1958	350cc	Norton	IOM; 7	NED; 3	BEL; 3	GER -	SWE -	ULS -	NAT -			8	7th	0
1958	500cc	Norton	IOM; NC	NED -	BEL; 2	GER -	SWE -	ULS -	NAT -			6	9th	0

== Bibliography ==
- Flack, Darryl (30 August 2023). The Immortals of Australian Motorcycle Racing: The World Champs (Part of the 7-volume comprehensive sports collection). Immortals of Australian Sport (7-book series). Gelding Street Press. ISBN 978-0-6452070-5-7.
