= Cecil Sandford =

British motorcycle racer (1928–2023)

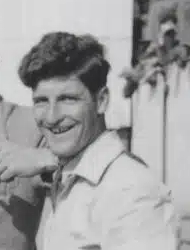
- Cecil Sandford in 1952
- Nationality: British
- Born: 21 February 1928; Blockley, Gloucestershire, England
- Died: 28 November 2023 (aged 95)
Motorcycle racing career statistics
Grand Prix motorcycle racing
Active years	1950–1957
First race	1950 350cc Ulster Grand Prix
Last race	1957 250cc Nations Grand Prix
First win	1952 125cc Isle of Man TT
Last win	1957 250cc Ulster Grand Prix
Team(s)	MV Agusta, Moto Guzzi, DKW, Mondial
Championships	125cc – 1952 250cc – 1957
Starts / Wins / Podiums / Poles / F. laps / Points; 42 / 5 / 21 / N/A / 3 / 149

Cecil Charles Sandford (21 February 1928 – 28 November 2023) was a British professional Grand Prix motorcycle road racer. He competed in the FIM motorcycle Grand Prix world championships from 1950 to 1957. Sandford was a two-time FIM road racing world champion and a two-time winner at the Isle of Man TT.

== Motorcycle racing career ==
Born in Blockley, Gloucestershire, Sandford began his career riding in local scramble and grass track events. In 1950, he was offered a place on the AJS factory racing team alongside the reigning world champion, Les Graham. He followed Graham to the MV Agusta team and won the 1952 FIM 125cc title, bringing Agusta their first world championship, as well as their first Isle of Man TT win.

Sandford left MV at the end of 1954, as he believed he was not getting equal treatment to his Italian team-mate Carlo Ubbiali. He raced as a privateer in 1955. In 1956, he signed a factory contract with DKW in the 350cc class, but he had a troubled time with the brand's two-stroke machines, finishing fifth in the world championship. He raced part-time for Mondial in the 125cc class in parallel, and signed a three-year factory contract with them at the end of the year. In the 1957 season, he won a second world championship, and a second Isle of Man TT race, this time in the 250cc class. Mondial announced their immediate withdrawal from Grand Prix racing in October 1957, and Sandford decided to retire from racing rather than carry on as a privateer. He later worked at a bike dealership at Shipston-on-Stour.

Sandford died on 28 November 2023, aged 95. He was the last surviving motorcycle Grand Prix world champion of the 1950s at the time of his death.

== Motorcycle Grand Prix results ==
Points system from 1950 to 1968

Position	1	2	3	4	5	6
Points	8	6	4	3	2	1

(key) (Races in italics indicate fastest lap)

Year	Class	Team	1	2	3	4	5	6	7	8	9	Points	Rank	Wins
1950	350cc	AJS	IOM -	BEL -	NED -	SUI -	ULS; 5	NAT; 6				3	13th	0
1951	250cc	Velocette	ESP -	SUI; 5	IOM -	BEL -	NED -	FRA -	ULS -	NAT -		2	12th	0
1951	350cc	Velocette	ESP -	SUI; 2	IOM -	BEL; 4	NED -	FRA -	ULS -	NAT -		9	9th	0
1952	125cc	MV Agusta	IOM; 1	NED; 1	GER; 3	ULS; 1	NAT -	ESP; 3				28	1st	3
1953	125cc	MV Agusta	IOM; 3	NED; 3		GER -		ULS; 2		NAT -	ESP; 2	20	2nd	0
1953	500cc	MV Agusta	IOM -	NED -	BEL -	GER -	FRA -	ULS -	SUI -	NAT; 5	ESP -	2	15th	0
1954	125cc	MV Agusta	IOM; 3	ULS; 5	NED -	GER; 5	NAT -	ESP -				8	8th	0
1955	250cc	Moto Guzzi		IOM; 2	GER; 3		NED; 5	ULS; 5	NAT -			12	3rd	0
1955	350cc	Moto Guzzi	FRA -	IOM; 3	GER; 4	BEL; 4	NED -	ULS; 4	NAT -			13	5th	0
1956	125cc	Mondial	IOM -	NED; 4	BEL -	GER; 6	ULS -	NAT -				4	13th	0
1956	350cc	DKW	IOM; 4	NED; 4	BEL; 3	GER; 4	ULS -	NAT; 5				13	5th	0
1957	125cc	Mondial	GER -	IOM; 5	NED; 4	BEL; 3	ULS -	NAT -				9	6th	0
1957	250cc	Mondial	GER; 3	IOM; 1	NED; 2	BEL; 3	ULS; 1	NAT; 4				26	1st	2
