= Bill Lomas =

British motorcycle racer

- Lomas demonstrating the light weight of the Moto Guzzi V8 engine
- Nationality: British
- Born: 8 March 1928; Milford, Derbyshire, England
- Died: 14 August 2007 (aged 79); Mansfield, England
Motorcycle racing career statistics
Grand Prix motorcycle racing
Active years	1950 – 1956
First race	1950 350cc Isle of Man Junior TT
Last race	1956 350cc Ulster Grand Prix
First win	1955 350cc Isle of Man Junior TT
Last win	1956 350cc Ulster Grand Prix
Team(s)	Moto Guzzi, MV Agusta
Championships	350cc – 1955, 1956
Starts / Wins / Podiums / Poles / F. laps / Points; 27 / 9 / 16 / 0 / 14 / 120

William Lomas (8 March 1928 – 14 August 2007) was an English Grand Prix motorcycle road racer. He was a two-time World Champion and a two-time Isle of Man TT winner. He won the 1955 and 1956 350cc world championship as a member of the Moto Guzzi factory racing team. In the 1956 season, he rode the famous V8 Moto Guzzi Grand Prix race bike. Lomas was also an accomplished trials rider.

Lomas died in Mansfield, England on 14 August 2007 from complications following a heart attack.

== Motorcycle Grand Prix results ==
Position	1	2	3	4	5	6
Points	8	6	4	3	2	1

(Races in italics indicate fastest lap)

Year	Class	Team	1	2	3	4	5	6	7	8	9	Points	Rank	Wins
1950	350cc	Velocette	IOM; NC	BEL; 4	NED; 3	SUI -	ULS -	NAT; 5				9	7th	0
1951	250cc	Velocette		SUI -	IOM -			FRA; 5	ULS -	NAT -		2	12th	0
1951	350cc	Velocette	ESP -	SUI -	IOM; 5	BEL; 3	NED -	FRA -	ULS -	NAT -		6	11th	0
1952	125cc	MV Agusta		IOM -	NED -		GER -	ULS; 2	NAT -	ESP -		6	8th	0
1952	250cc	Velocette	SUI -	IOM; NC	NED -		GER -	ULS -	NAT -			0	–	0
1952	350cc	AJS	SUI -	IOM; 4	NED -	BEL; 5	GER; 3	ULS -	NAT -	ESP -		9	7th	0
1952	500cc	MV Agusta	SUI -	IOM; 5	NED -	BEL -	GER -	ULS; 3	NAT -	ESP -		6	13th	0
1954	250cc	MV Agusta	FRA -	IOM; NC	ULS -		NED -	GER -	SUI -	NAT -		0	–	0
1954	350cc	MV Agusta	FRA -	IOM; 7	ULS -	BEL -	NED -	GER -	SUI -	NAT -	ESP -	0	–	0
1954	500cc	MV Agusta	FRA -	IOM; NC	ULS -	BEL -	NED -	GER -	SUI -	NAT -	ESP -	0	–	0
1955	125cc	MV Agusta	ESP -	FRA -	IOM; 4	GER -		NED -		NAT -		3	9th	0
1955	250cc	Moto Guzzi			IOM; 1	GER -		NED; DSQ	ULS; 4	NAT; 5		13	2nd	1
1955	350cc	Moto Guzzi		FRA -	IOM; 1	GER; 1	BEL; 1	NED; 2	ULS; 1	NAT; 2		32	1st	4
1955	500cc	Moto Guzzi	ESP -	FRA -	IOM; 7	GER -	BEL -	NED -	ULS; 1	NAT -		8	6th	1
1956	350cc	Moto Guzzi	IOM; NC	NED; 1	BEL -	GER; 1	ULS; 1	NAT -				24	1st	3
1956	500cc	Moto Guzzi	IOM; 5	NED -	BEL -	GER -	ULS -	NAT -				2	16th	0
