= Roberto Colombo =

Roberto Colombo may refer to:

- Roberto Colombo (footballer) (born 1975), Italian football player
- Roberto Colombo (motorcyclist) (1927–1957), Italian former Grand Prix motorcycle racer
- Roberto Colombo (politician), Italian politician
- Roberto Colombo (music producer), Italian music producer
