= Roberto Colombo (motorcyclist) =

Italian motorcycle racer (1927–1957)

- Nationality: Italian
- Born: 5 January 1927; Casatenovo, Italy
- Died: 6 July 1957 (aged 30); Francorchamps, Belgium
Motorcycle racing career statistics
Grand Prix motorcycle racing
Active years	1952, 1954 - 1957
First race	1952 250cc Nations Grand Prix
Last race	1957 125cc Dutch TT
Team(s)	Moto Guzzi, MV Agusta
Starts / Wins / Podiums / Poles / F. laps / Points; 22 / 0 / 8 / 0 / 0 / 54

Roberto Colombo (5 January 1927 in Casatenovo – 6 July 1957 in Francorchamps) was an Italian Grand Prix motorcycle road racer who competed for the MV Agusta factory racing team. His best seasons were 1956 and 1957 when he finished fourth in the 250cc world championship. Colombo was killed during practice for the 1957 Belgian Grand Prix.

== Motorcycle Grand Prix results ==
Points system from 1950 to 1968:

Position	1	2	3	4	5	6
Points	8	6	4	3	2	1

(Races in italics indicate fastest lap)

Year	Class	Team	1	2	3	4	5	6	7	8	Points	Rank	Wins
1952	250cc	NSU	SUI -	IOM -	NED -	GER -	ULS -	NAT; 5	ESP -		2	16th	0
1954	125cc	MV Agusta		IOM -	ULS -	NED -	GER -		NAT -	ESP; 2	6	9th	0
1954	250cc	Moto Guzzi	FRA -	IOM -	ULS -	NED -	GER -	SUI; 5	NAT; 4		5	8th	0
1955	350cc	Moto Guzzi	FRA; 3	IOM -	GER -	BEL; 5	NED -	ULS -	NAT; 6		7	10th	0
1956	125cc	MV Agusta	IOM; NC	NED -	BEL -	GER -	ULS -	NAT -			0	-	0
1956	250cc	MV Agusta	IOM; 2	NED; 4	BEL -	GER -	ULS -	NAT -			9	4th	0
1956	350cc	MV Agusta	IOM -	NED -	BEL -	GER -	ULS -	NAT; 3			4	11th	0
1957	125cc	MV Agusta	GER; 3	IOM; 6	NED; 2	BEL -	ULS -	NAT -			11	5th	0
1957	250cc	MV Agusta	GER; 2	IOM; 3	NED -	BEL -	ULS -	NAT -			10	4th	0
