= 1955 Grand Prix motorcycle racing season =

Sports season

1955 F.I.M. Grand Prix motorcycle racing season

Seasons
- ← 1954 1956 →

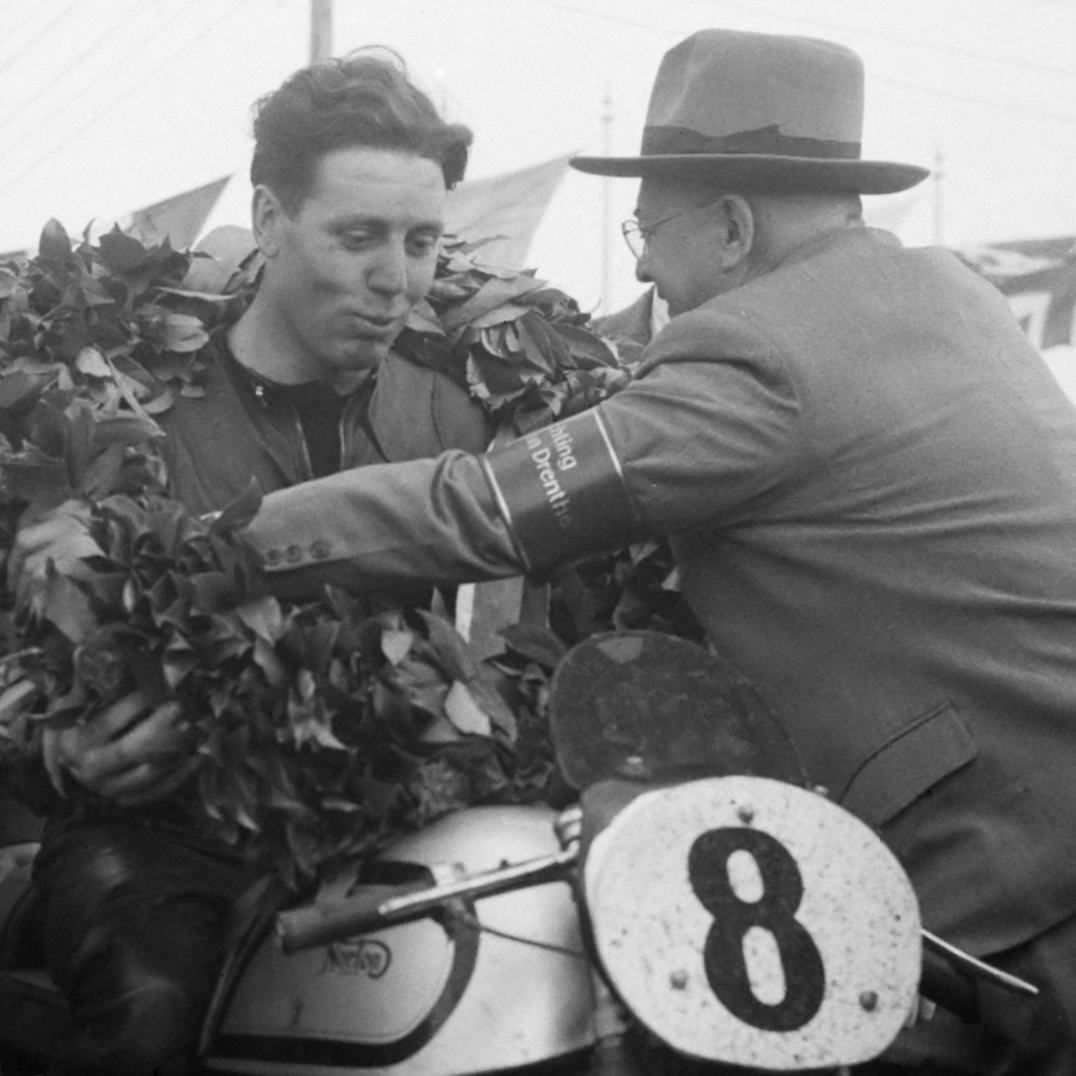
Geoff Duke (pictured in 1951) won his last 500cc World Championship title in 1955.

The 1955 Grand Prix motorcycle racing season was the seventh F.I.M. Road Racing World Championship Grand Prix season. The season consisted of eight Grand Prix races in five classes: 500cc, 350cc, 250cc, 125cc and Sidecars 500cc. It began on 1 May, with Spanish Grand Prix and ended with Nations Grand Prix in Italy on 4 September.

== 1955 Grand Prix season calendar ==
Round	Date	Grand Prix	Circuit	125cc winner	250cc winner	350cc winner	500cc winner	Sidecars 500cc winner	Report
1	1 May	(Spain) Spanish Grand Prix	Montjuïc Circuit	(Switzerland) Luigi Taveri			(Republic of Ireland) Reg Armstrong	(West Germany) Faust / Remmert	Report
2	15 May	(France) French Grand Prix	Reims	(Italy) Carlo Ubbiali		(Italy) Duilio Agostini	(United Kingdom) Geoff Duke		Report
3	10 June	Isle of Man TT	Snaefell Mountain	(Italy) Carlo Ubbiali	(United Kingdom) Bill Lomas	(United Kingdom) Bill Lomas	(United Kingdom) Geoff Duke	(West Germany) Schneider / Strauß	Report
4	26 June	(West Germany) German Grand Prix	Nürburgring Nordschleife	(Italy) Carlo Ubbiali	(West Germany) Hermann Paul Müller	(United Kingdom) Bill Lomas	(United Kingdom) Geoff Duke	(West Germany) Faust / Remmert	Report
5	3 July	(Belgium) Belgian Grand Prix	Spa-Francorchamps			(United Kingdom) Bill Lomas	(Italy) Giuseppe Colnago	(West Germany) Noll / Cron	Report
6	16 July	(Netherlands) Dutch TT	TT Circuit Assen	(Italy) Carlo Ubbiali	(Switzerland) Luigi Taveri	(Australia) Ken Kavanagh	(United Kingdom) Geoff Duke	(West Germany) Faust / Remmert	Report
7	13 August	(Northern Ireland) Ulster Grand Prix	Dundrod Circuit		(United Kingdom) John Surtees	(United Kingdom) Bill Lomas	(United Kingdom) Bill Lomas		Report
8	4 September	(Italy) Nations Grand Prix	Monza	(Italy) Carlo Ubbiali	(Italy) Carlo Ubbiali	(United Kingdom) Dickie Dale	(Italy) Umberto Masetti	(West Germany) Noll / Cron	Report

== Standings ==
=== Scoring system ===
Points were awarded to the top six finishers in each race. Only the four best races counted in the Sidecars, 125cc and 250cc, while in the 350cc and 500cc championships, the five best results were counted.

Position	1st	2nd	3rd	4th	5th	6th
Points	8	6	4	3	2	1

==== 500cc final standings ====
Pos	Rider	Machine	ESP (Spain)	FRA (France)	MAN (United Kingdom)	GER (Germany)	BEL (Belgium)	HOL (Netherlands)	ULS (Ulster)	NAC (Italy)	Pts
1	(United Kingdom) Geoff Duke	Gilera	Ret	1	1	1	Ret	1		3	**36**
2	(Republic of Ireland) Reg Armstrong	Gilera	1	3	2	Ret	Ret	2		2	**30**
3	(Italy) Umberto Masetti	MV Agusta	3			4		3		1	**19**
4	(Italy) Giuseppe Colnago	Gilera	7			5	1	Ret		4	**13**
5	(Italy) Carlo Bandirola	MV Agusta	**2**	11		3	Ret			Ret	**10**
6	(United Kingdom) Bill Lomas	Moto Guzzi			7				1		**8**
7	(France) Pierre Monneret	Gilera		10			2			Ret	**6**
8	(United Kingdom) John Hartle	Norton			13				2		**6**
9	(Italy) Libero Liberati	Gilera		2						Ret	**6**
10	(Germany) Walter Zeller	BMW				2					**6**
11	(United Kingdom) Bob McIntyre	Norton			5				4		**5**
12	(United Kingdom) Dickie Dale	Moto Guzzi	Ret						3		**4**
=	(Australia) Ken Kavanagh	Moto Guzzi	Ret		3						**4**
14	(Belgium) Léon Martin	Gilera					3				**4**
15	(Italy) Tito Forconi	MV Agusta	6	4			Ret			Ret	**4**
16	(Italy) Duilio Agostini	Moto Guzzi	Ret				4				**3**
=	(United Kingdom) Jack Brett	Norton			4				Ret		**3**
18	(Italy) Orlando Valdinoci	Gilera	4								**3**
=	(Netherlands) Drikus Veer	Gilera						4			**3**
20	(Australia) Bob Brown	Matchless			16		11	5			**2**
21	(Italy) Alfredo Milani	Gilera					Ret	14		5	**2**
22	(New Zealand) Peter Murphy	Matchless		Ret	Ret			Ret	5		**2**
23	(Belgium) Auguste Goffin	Norton		Ret		Ret	5				**2**
24	(France) Jacques Collot	Norton		5						Ret	**2**
=	(Italy) Nello Pagani	MV Agusta	5	Ret							**2**
26	(Australia) Jack Ahearn	Norton			Ret	6	7	Ret	Ret		**1**
27	(South Africa) Eddie Grant	Matchless / Norton			14		16	6			**1**
28	(United Kingdom) John Clark	Matchless			Ret				6		**1**
=	(Germany) Ernst Riedelbauch	BMW				Ret				6	**1**
=	(United Kingdom) John Storr	Norton		Ret			6				**1**
31	(Belgium) Firmin Dauwe	Norton		6							**1**
=	(Isle of Man) Derek Ennett	Matchless			6						**1**
33	(Germany) Hans-Günther Jäger	Norton				7		8			0
=	(United Kingdom) Eric Jones	Norton			8				7		0
35	(Switzerland) Florian Camathias	Norton		7					Ret		0
=	(Austria) Gerold Klinger	BMW				Ret				7	0
37	(Netherlands) Piet Bakker	Norton						7			0
38	(New Zealand) Len Aislabie	Norton			20	Ret	8		Ret		0
39	(Sweden) Sven Andersson	Norton			Ret	8				Ret	0
40	(United Kingdom) William Hall	Norton						Ret		8	0
41	(France) Marcel Beauvais	Norton		8							0
=	(Spain) Alfredo Flores	Norton	8								0
=	(Netherlands) Priem Rozenberg	BMW						8			0
44	(Northern Ireland) Bob Matthews	Norton				11	9	Ret	11		0
45	(New Zealand) Bill Collett	Matchless			23		Ret		9		0
46	(United Kingdom) Derek Powell	Matchless			9				Ret		0
=	(United Kingdom) Percy Tait	Norton			Ret				9		0
48	(France) Jean-Pierre Bayle	Norton		9							0
=	(Italy) Enrico Galante	Norton								9	0
=	(Sweden) Kuno Johansson	Matchless				9					0
51	(United Kingdom) Phil Heath	Norton				14	13	10	Ret		0
52	(United Kingdom) Peter Davey	Norton			10			Ret			0
=	(Germany) Ernst Hiller	Matchless				10				Ret	0
=	(New Zealand) Maurice Low	Triumph / BSA			Ret				10		0
55	(Italy) Artemio Cirelli	Gilera								10	0
=	(Belgium) Edouard Texidor	Norton					10				0
56	(United Kingdom) Robin Fitton	Norton		Ret				11	Ret		0
=	(Netherlands) Piet Knijnenburg	Matchless						11			0
=	(South Africa) Ray Travers	Norton			11						0
59	(Northern Ireland) Malcolm Templeton	Matchless			30				12		0
60	(New Zealand) John Hempleman	Norton			Ret		12		Ret		0
61	(Northern Ireland) Mike O'Rourke	Norton			12						0
=	(Germany) Hans-Joachim Scheel	Norton				12					0
63	(Guernsey) Ken Tostevin	Matchless			Ret				13		0
64	(Germany) Heinz Schreiber	Norton				13					0
=	(Netherlands) Casper Swart	Norton						13			0
66	(United Kingdom) Angus Martin	Norton			40				14		0
67	(United Kingdom) Peter Davey	Norton					14				0
68	(United Kingdom) Arthur Wheeler	Matchless			17		15		Ret		0
69	(United Kingdom) Harry Pearce	Matchless			15						0
=	(Germany) Karl-Heinz Scheifel	Norton				15					0
=	(Netherlands) Gerrit Ten Kate	Norton						15			0
=	(Northern Ireland) Harry Turner	Norton							15		0
73	(United Kingdom) Ralph Rensen	Norton			33				16		0
74	(New Zealand) Frederick Cook	Matchless			18		17	Ret	Ret		0
75	(Northern Ireland) Ernie Oliver	Norton							17		0
76	(Northern Ireland) Dick Knox	Norton							18		0
77	(United Kingdom) Robert King	Norton			Ret				19		0
78	(United Kingdom) John Denton	Norton			19						0
79	(United Kingdom) Ken Swallow	Matchless			43				20		0
80	(Isle of Man) George Costain	Norton			21						0
=	(Northern Ireland) Jimmy Hayes	AJS							21		0
82	(United Kingdom) Roy Evans	Matchless							22		0
=	(Canada) Ivor Lloyd	Norton			22						0
84	(United Kingdom) Geoff Read	Norton			24						0
85	(United Kingdom) Dave Chadwick	Norton			25				Ret		0
86	(Wales) Frank Perris	Matchless			26				Ret		0
87	(United Kingdom) Eric Pantilin	Norton			27						0
88	(United Kingdom) Albert Moule	BSA			28						0
89	(United Kingdom) John Surtees	Norton			29	Ret			Ret		0
90	(United Kingdom) Bob Rowbottom	Norton			31						0
91	(United Kingdom) George Catlin	Norton			32						0
92	(United Kingdom) Philip Palmer	BSA			34						0
93	(United Kingdom) Ken Tully	Norton			35						0
94	(United Kingdom) Terry Shepherd	Norton			36						0
95	(United Kingdom) Jack Bailey	Norton			37						0
96	(United Kingdom) Bill Beevers	Norton			38						0
97	(United Kingdom) Bill Roberton	Norton			39						0
98	(United Kingdom) Joe Glazebrook	Norton			41						0
99	(United Kingdom) Ray Fay	BSA			42						0
100	(Dominion of Ceylon) Ralph Wijesinghe	BSA			44						0
101	(United Kingdom) Walter Hancock	BSA			45						0
102	(United Kingdom) Willie Wilshere	Norton			46						0
103	(United Kingdom) Frank Norris	Norton			47						0
–	(United Kingdom) Tony McAlpine	BMW				Ret	Ret	Ret		Ret	0
–	(Australia) Keith Campbell	Norton				Ret		Ret		Ret	0
–	(New Zealand) Chris Stormont	BSA			Ret			Ret	Ret		0
–	(Morocco) Francis Flahaut	Norton		Ret		Ret					0
–	(Sweden) Ulf Gate	Matchless			Ret					Ret	0
–	(Switzerland) Hans Haldemann	Norton		Ret					Ret		0
–	(Australia) Dick Thomson	Matchless			Ret					Ret	0
–	(United Kingdom) Fergus Anderson	Moto Guzzi					Ret				0
–	(Spain) Fernando Aranda	Norton					Ret				0
–	(Germany) Bruno Böhrer	Horex								Ret	0
–	(Italy) Paolo Campanelli	Gilera								Ret	0
–	(United Kingdom) Roly Capner	BSA			Ret						0
–	(United Kingdom) Louis Carr	Norton			Ret						0
–	(Northern Ireland) Louis Carter	Norton							Ret		0
–	(Northern Ireland) Phil Carter	Matchless			Ret						0
–	(United Kingdom) Eric Cheers	Matchless			Ret						0
–	(Italy) Franco Chinelli	Gilera								Ret	0
–	(Spain) Javier de Ortueta	Norton					Ret				0
–	(Dominion of Ceylon) Rally Dean	Norton							Ret		0
–	(United Kingdom) Stanley Dibben	Norton	Ret								0
–	(Netherlands) Anton Elbersen	Norton						Ret			0
–	(Italy) Lodovico Facchinelli	Gilera								Ret	0
–	(Italy) Luigi Folconi	Moto Guzzi								Ret	0
–	(Northern Ireland) Bob Ferguson	AJS			Ret						0
–	(United Kingdom) Jack Forrest	BMW						Ret			0
–	(Isle of Man) Frank Fox	Norton			Ret						0
–	(Italy) Martino Giani	Gilera								Ret	0
–	(Spain) Francisco González	Norton	Ret								0
–	(Gibraltar) John Grace	Norton	Ret								0
–	(Italy) Francesco Guglielminetti	Norton								Ret	0
–	(Northern Ireland) Wilf Herron	Norton							Ret		0
–	(United Kingdom) Eric Houseley	Matchless						Ret			0
–	(United Kingdom) Roy Ingram	Norton			Ret						0
–	(United Kingdom) Arnold Jones	Matchless			Ret						0
–	(Finland) Harald Karlsson	Norton			Ret						0
–	(Germany) Rudolf Knees	Norton				Ret					0
–	(United Kingdom) George Leigh	Norton			Ret						0
–	(Northern Ireland) Robert McCracken	Triumph							Ret		0
–	(United Kingdom) George Northwood	BSA			Ret						0
–	(Belgium) Pierre Nicholas	Norton					Ret				0
–	(United Kingdom) Tony Ovens	Norton			Ret						0
–	(United Kingdom) Harry Plews	Norton			Ret						0
–	(Australia) Maurice Quincey	Norton			Ret						0
–	(Canada) Gerald Robarts	Norton			Ret						0
–	(Republic of Ireland) Michael Roche	Norton							Ret		0
–	(United Kingdom) Charlie Salt	BSA			Ret						0
–	(United Kingdom) George Salt	Matchless			Ret						0
–	(Republic of Ireland) W. Stewart	Norton							Ret		0
–	(Netherlands) Martinus van Son	Norton						Ret			0
–	(Republic of Ireland) John Williamson	Norton							Ret		0
–	(Isle of Man) Jackie Wood	Norton			Ret						0
–	(Germany) Erich Wünsche	Norton								Ret	0
–	(Germany) Georg Braun	Horex			DNS						0
–	(Australia) Allen Burt	Matchless			DNS						0
–	(Argentina) Ricardo Galvagni	Norton				DNS					0
–	(Finland) Sakari Järvimaa	Matchless			DNS						0
–	(Argentina) Armando Poggi	Norton				DNS					0
–	(Dominion of Ceylon) R. Siriwardena	Norton			DNS						0
–	(Northern Ireland) W.H. Spence	Norton			DNS						0
–	(United Kingdom) Des Wright	BSA			DNS						0
Pos	Rider	Bike	ESP (Spain)	FRA (France)	MAN (United Kingdom)	GER (Germany)	BEL (Belgium)	HOL (Netherlands)	ULS (Ulster)	NAC (Italy)	Pts

Colour	Result
Gold	Winner
Silver	Second place
Bronze	Third place
Green	Points classification
Blue	Non-points classification
Blue	Non-classified finish (NC)
Purple	Retired, not classified (Ret)
Red	Did not qualify (DNQ)
Red	Did not pre-qualify (DNPQ)
Black	Disqualified (DSQ)
White	Did not start (DNS)
White	Withdrew (WD)
White	Race cancelled (C)
Blank	Did not practice (DNP)
Blank	Did not arrive (DNA)
Blank	Excluded (EX)

**Bold** – Pole
Italics – Fastest Lap

=== 350cc Standings ===
Place	Rider	Number	Country	Machine	Points	Wins
1	(United Kingdom) Bill Lomas	72	United Kingdom	Moto Guzzi	32	4
2	(United Kingdom) Dickie Dale		United Kingdom	Moto Guzzi	18	1
3	(West Germany) August Hobl		Germany	DKW	17	0
4	(Australia) Ken Kavanagh		Australia	Moto Guzzi	14	1
5	(United Kingdom) Cecil Sandford		United Kingdom	Moto Guzzi	13	0
6	(United Kingdom) John Surtees		United Kingdom	Norton	11	0
7	(Italy) Duilio Agostini		Italy	Moto Guzzi	8	1
8	(United Kingdom) Bob McIntyre		United Kingdom	Norton	8	0
9	(United Kingdom) John Hartle		United Kingdom	Norton	7	0
10	(Italy) Roberto Colombo		Italy	Moto Guzzi	7	0
11	(Australia) Keith Campbell		Australia	Norton	4	0
12	(Italy) Enrico Lorenzetti		Italy	Moto Guzzi	3	0
=	(Belgium) Auguste Goffin		Belgium	Velocette	3	0
14	(New Zealand) Peter Murphy		New Zealand	AJS	3	0
=	(West Germany) Karl Hofmann		Germany	DKW	3	0
16	(Australia) Maurice Quincey		Australia	Norton	2	0
17	(Netherlands) Hans Bartl		Netherlands	DKW	2	0
18	(France) Jacques Collot		France	Norton	1	0

=== 250cc Standings ===
Place	Rider	Number	Country	Machine	Points	Wins
1	(West Germany) Hermann Paul Müller		Germany	NSU	16	1
2	(United Kingdom) Cecil Sandford		United Kingdom	Moto Guzzi	14	0
3	(United Kingdom) Bill Lomas		United Kingdom	MV Agusta	13	1
4	(Switzerland) Luigi Taveri		Switzerland	MV Agusta	11	1
5	(Italy) Umberto Masetti		Italy	MV Agusta	11	0
6	(United Kingdom) Sammy Miller		United Kingdom	NSU	10	0
7	(United Kingdom) John Surtees		United Kingdom	NSU	8	1
=	(Italy) Carlo Ubbiali		Italy	MV Agusta	8	1
9	(West Germany) Hans Baltisberger		Germany	NSU	6	0
=	(West Germany) Wolfgang Brandt		Germany	NSU	6	0
11	(United Kingdom) Arthur Wheeler		United Kingdom	Moto Guzzi	6	0
12	(Italy) Enrico Lorenzetti		Italy	Moto Guzzi	3	0
13	(United Kingdom) Dave Chadwick		United Kingdom	RD Special	2	0
14	(United Kingdom) Bill Webster		United Kingdom	Velocette	1	0
=	(West Germany) Helmut Hallmeier		Germany	NSU	1	0

=== 125cc ===
==== Riders' standings ====
Pos.	Rider	Bike	ESP (Spain)	FRA (France)	MAN (United Kingdom)	GER (Germany)	NED (Netherlands)	NAT (Italy)	Pts
1	(Italy) Carlo Ubbiali	MV Agusta	3	1	1**^{F}**	1**^{F}**	1	1**^{F}**	32 (44)
2	(Switzerland) Luigi Taveri	MV Agusta	1	2	2	2	NC**^{F}**		26
3	(Italy) Remo Venturi	MV Agusta				3	2	2	16
4	(Italy) Giuseppe Lattanzi	Mondial	4	3	3				11
5	(Italy) Angelo Copeta	MV Agusta	5	5				3	8
6	(Italy) Romolo Ferri	Mondial	2**^{F}**	6**^{F}**					7
7	(United Kingdom) Bill Webster	MV Agusta			5		4		5
8	(Austria) Rudolf Grimas	Mondial					3		4
9	(Italy) Tarquinio Provini	Mondial		4					3
9	(United Kingdom) Bill Lomas	MV Agusta			4				3
9	(West Germany) Karl Lottes	MV Agusta				4			3
9	(West Germany) August Hobl	DKW						4	3
13	(East Germany) Bernhard Petruschke	IFA				5			2
13	(West Germany) Willi Scheidhauer	MV Agusta					5		2
13	(West Germany) Sigfried Wünsche	DKW						5	2
16	(Spain) Marcelo Cama	Montesa	6						1
16	(United Kingdom) Ross Porter	MV Agusta			6				1
16	(East Germany) Erhard Krumpholz	IFA				6			1
16	(West Germany) Erich Wünsche	MV Agusta					6		1
16	(Italy) Paolo Campanelli	Mondial						6	1
Pos.	Rider	Bike	ESP (Spain)	FRA (France)	MAN (United Kingdom)	GER (Germany)	NED (Netherlands)	NAT (Italy)	Pts

Race key
Colour	Result
Gold	Winner
Silver	2nd place
Bronze	3rd place
Green	Points finish
Blue	Non-points finish
Blue	Non-classified finish (NC)
Purple	Retired (Ret)
Red	Did not qualify (DNQ)
Black	Disqualified (DSQ)
White	Did not start (DNS)
White	Withdrew (WD)
White	Race cancelled (C)
Blank	Did not practice (DNP)
Blank	Excluded (EX)
Blank	Did not arrive (DNA)
Blank	Did not enter (empty cell)
Annotation	Meaning
P	Pole position
F	Fastest lap
Rider key
Colour	Meaning
Light blue	Rookie rider

==== Constructors' standings ====
Each constructor is awarded the same number of points as their best placed rider in each race.

Pos.	Constructor	ESP (Spain)	FRA (France)	MAN (United Kingdom)	GER (Germany)	NED (Netherlands)	NAT (Italy)	Pts
1	(Italy) MV Agusta	1	1	1	1	1	1	32 (48)
2	(Italy) Mondial	2	3	3		3	6	18 (19)
3	(West Germany) DKW						4	3
4	(East Germany) IFA				5			2
5	(Spain) Montesa	6						1
Pos.	Constructor	ESP (Spain)	FRA (France)	MAN (United Kingdom)	GER (Germany)	NED (Netherlands)	NAT (Italy)	Pts
