= 1956 Isle of Man TT =

Grand prix

Race details
- Race 1 of 6 races in the 1956 Grand Prix motorcycle racing season
- Date: 4–14 June 1956
- Official name: Isle of Man Tourist Trophy
- Location: Snaefell Mountain Course (Senior, Junior, Clubmans Senior and Clubmans Junior); Clypse Course (Ultra Lightweight, Lightweight and Sidecars)
- Course: Public roads; Mountain Course 60.72 km (37.73 mi); Clypse Course 17.63 km (10.95 mi)

500cc
- Rider
Fastest lap
Rider	(United Kingdom) John Surtees	MV Agusta
Time	23:09.4	
Podium
First	(United Kingdom) John Surtees	MV Agusta
Second	(United Kingdom) John Hartle	Norton
Third	(United Kingdom) Jack Brett	Norton

350cc
- Rider
Fastest lap
Rider	(Australia) Ken Kavanagh	Moto Guzzi
Time	24:18.8	
Podium
First	(Australia) Ken Kavanagh	Moto Guzzi
Second	(Isle of Man) Derek Ennett	AJS
Third	(United Kingdom) John Hartle	Norton

250cc
- Rider
Fastest lap
Rider	(Germany) Hans Baltisberger	NSU
Time	9:21.6	
Podium
First	(Italy) Carlo Ubbiali	MV Agusta
Second	(Italy) Roberto Colombo	MV Agusta
Third	(Germany) Hans Baltisberger	NSU

125cc
- Rider
Fastest lap
Rider	(Italy) Carlo Ubbiali	MV Agusta
Time	9:09.8	
Podium
First	(Italy) Carlo Ubbiali	MV Agusta
Second	(Spain) Marcelo Cama	Montesa
Third	(Spain) Francisco González	Montesa

Sidecar (B2A)
- Rider
Fastest lap
Rider	(Germany) Willhelm Noll	BMW
Time	9:01.6	
Podium
First	(Germany) Fritz Hillebrand	BMW
Second	(United Kingdom) Pip Harris	Norton
Third	(United Kingdom) Bill Boddice	Norton

The 1956 Isle of Man TT was the first round of the 1956 Grand Prix motorcycle racing season. It took place between 4 June and 8 June 1956 at the Snaefell Mountain Course for the Senior and Junior TTs and the Clypse Course for the Lightweight, Ultra Lightweight and Sidecar TTs.

== Senior TT (500 cc) classification ==
Pos	Rider	Manufacturer	Laps	Time	Points
1	(United Kingdom) John Surtees	MV Agusta	7	2:44:05.8	8
2	(United Kingdom) John Hartle	MV Agusta	7	+1:30.8	6
3	(United Kingdom) Jack Brett	Norton	7	+2:48.4	4
4	(Germany) Walter Zeller	BMW	7	+3:16.4	3
5	(United Kingdom) Bill Lomas	Moto Guzzi	7	+3:22.8	2
6	(Isle of Man) Derek Ennett	Matchless	7	+6:34.6	1
7	(United Kingdom) Alan Trow	Norton	7	+9:22.0	
8	(New Zealand) Gavin Dunlop	Matchless	7	+9:22.0	
9	(United Kingdom) George Salt	Norton	7	+10:13.4	
10	(United Kingdom) Don Chapman	Norton	7	+10:37.4	
45 finishers

== Junior TT (350 cc) classification ==
Pos	Rider	Manufacturer	Laps	Time	Points
1	(Australia) Ken Kavanagh	Moto Guzzi	7	2:57:29.4	8
2	(Isle of Man) Derek Ennett	AJS	7	+4:38.0	6
3	(United Kingdom) John Hartle	Norton	7	+7:19.2	4
4	(United Kingdom) Cecil Sandford	DKW	7	+7:19.4	3
5	(South Africa) Eddie Grant	Norton	7	+10:14.6	2
6	(United Kingdom) Alan Trow	Norton	7	+11:11.4	1
7	(United Kingdom) Derek Powell	AJS	7	+11:46.6	
8	(United Kingdom) Frank Perris	AJS	7	+12:11.4	
9	(Italy) Duilio Agostini	Moto Guzzi	7	+13:23.2	
10	(United Kingdom) Terry Shepherd	Norton	7	+13:29.2	
42 finishers

== Lightweight TT (250 cc) classification ==
Pos	Rider	Manufacturer	Laps	Time	Points
1	(Italy) Carlo Ubbiali	MV Agusta	9	1:26:54.0	8
2	(Italy) Roberto Colombo	MV Agusta	9	+2:08.6	6
3	(Germany) Hans Baltisberger	NSU	9	+2:30.6	4
4	(Germany) Horst Kassner	NSU	9	+2:33.6	3
5	(Czechoslovakia) František Bartoš	ČZ	9	+5:11.0	2
6	(United Kingdom) Arthur Wheeler	Moto Guzzi	9	+5:26.6	1
7	(United Kingdom) Phil Carter	RDS	9	+8:32.2	
8	(United Kingdom) Albert Jones	Norton	9	+9:16.6	
9	(United Kingdom) Frank Cope	Norton	9	+11:51.2	
10	(United Kingdom) Norman Webb	Moto Guzzi	9	+16:36.2	
10 finishers

== Ultra Lightweight TT (125cc) classification ==
Pos	Rider	Manufacturer	Laps	Time/Retired	Points
1	(Italy) Carlo Ubbiali	MV Agusta	9	1:24:16.8	8
2	(Spain) Marcelo Cama	Montesa	9	+5:02.4	6
3	(Spain) Francisco González	Montesa	9	+11:02.0	4
4	(Spain) Enrique Sirera	Montesa	9	+11:07.0	4
5	(United Kingdom) Dave Chadwick	LEF	9	+12:26.0	2
6	(Czechoslovakia) Václav Parus	ČZ	9	+13:07.2	1
7	(United Kingdom) Douglas Allen	Mondial	9	+14:01.6	
8	(United Kingdom) Dudley Edlin	MV Agusta	9	+15:28.2	
9	(United Kingdom) Frank Cope	Norton	9	+20:01.8	
22 starters, 9 finishers

== Sidecar TT classification ==
Pos	Rider	Passenger	Manufacturer	Laps	Time	Points
1	(Germany) Fritz Hillebrand	(Germany) Manfred Grunwald	BMW	9	1:23:12.2	8
2	(United Kingdom) Pip Harris	(United Kingdom) Ray Campbell	Norton	9	+1:35.6	6
3	(United Kingdom) Bill Boddice	(United Kingdom) William Storr	Norton	9	+3:07.0	4
4	(Australia) Bob Mitchell	(United Kingdom) Eric Bliss	Norton	9	+4:04.6	3
5	(United Kingdom) Jackie Beeton	(United Kingdom) Les Nutt	Norton	9	+5:41.4	2
6	(United Kingdom) Ernie Walker	(United Kingdom) Dun Roberts	Norton	9	+5:47.2	1
7	(United Kingdom) Fred Hanks	(United Kingdom) E. Donnan	Matchless	9	+8:35.8	
8	(United Kingdom) Alan Young	(United Kingdom) Tony Partridge	Norton	9	+9:01.8	
9	(United Kingdom) Bill Beevers	(United Kingdom) Jeff Mundy	Norton	9	+9:29.8	
10	(United Kingdom) Len Taylor	(United Kingdom) Peter Glover	Norton	9	+9:53.2	
15 finishers

== Non-championship races ==
=== Clubmans Senior TT classification ===
Pos	Rider	Manufacturer	Laps	Time
1	Bernard Codd	BSA	3	1:18:40.6
2	Ron Jerrard	BSA	3	+1:06.2
3	Tony Jenkins	BSA	3	+2:41.8
4	Fred Wallis	BSA	3	+2:43.6
5	Dennis Smart	BSA	3	+4:34.4
6	Geoffrey Coombes	BSA	3	+5:24.2
7	John Hurlstone	Triumph	3	
8	W. J. Hill	BSA	3	
9	Brian Newman	BSA	3	
10	David Andrews	BSA	3	
28 finishers

=== Clubmans Junior TT classification ===
Pos	Rider	Manufacturer	Laps	Time
1	Bernard Codd	BSA	3	1:22:48.4
2	John Eckhart	BSA	3	+41.6
3	Alan Shepherd	Norton	3	+2:54.8
4	Eric Unwin	BSA	3	+3:19.6
5	Derrick Jervis	BSA	3	+3:20.4
6	Jimmy Morton	BSA	3	+3:32.8
7	James Coates	BSA	3	
8	Norman Robertson	BSA	3	
9	Ken James	BSA	3	
10	Denis Pratt	BSA	3	
50 finishers

Previous race: 1955 Nations Grand Prix	FIM Grand Prix World Championship; 1956 season	Next race: 1956 Dutch TT
Previous race: 1955 Isle of Man TT	Isle of Man TT	Next race: 1957 Isle of Man TT
