= 1957 Isle of Man TT =

Annual motorcycle racing event

(United Kingdom) 1957 Isle of Man TT Races
Race details
- Race No 2 of 6 races in the 1957 Grand Prix motorcycle racing season.
Date	3 – 7 June 1957
Location	Douglas, Isle of Man
Course	Road Course; 37.73 mi / 60.20 km

Senior TT 500cc
Pole Position	Fastest Lap
2. (Scotland) Bob McIntyre	3. (Scotland) Bob McIntyre
	101.12 mph
Podium
1. (Scotland) Bob McIntyre
2. (United Kingdom) John Surtees	3. (Australia) Bob Brown

Junior TT 350 cc
Pole Position	Fastest Lap
2.	3. (Scotland) Bob McIntyre
	97.42 mph
Podium
1. (Scotland) Bob McIntyre
2. (Australia) Keith Campbell	3. (Australia) Bob Brown

Lightweight 250 cc
Pole Position	Fastest Lap
2.	3. (Italy) Tarquinio Provini
	78.00 mph *Clypse Course
Podium
1. (United Kingdom) Cecil Sandford
2. (Switzerland) Luigi Taveri	3. (Italy) Roberto Colombo

The 1957 Isle of Man Tourist Trophy was the Golden Jubilee event and the second race in the 1957 Motorcycle World Championships.

== Background ==
The first event was the 350cc 1957 Junior TT race held on the Snaefell mountain course. The race was initially led by Bob McIntyre riding a Gilera motorcycle who beat the lap record for the Junior TT race from a standing start in 23 minutes and 14.2 seconds, an average speed of 97.42 mph and 42 seconds faster than the lap record set by Ray Amm in the 1954 Junior TT Race. On lap 1, John Surtees riding for MV Agusta had to stop at the pits to change a spark plug, followed by Bob McIntrye who had to change a plug on the end of lap 2. The delay to McIntyre handed the lead to Dickie Dale riding a Moto Guzzi Grand Prix single-cylinder and led John Hartle riding a Norton in 2nd place by 22.2 seconds and Bob McIntyre in 3rd place by 24.6 seconds. A delay in the pits on lap 3 for Dickie Dale of 3 minutes and 38 seconds to replace a smashed windscreen allowed Bob McIntyre to regain the lead. An engine failure on lap 4 at Quarry Bends to the Norton of Jackie Wood, caused Dale and Hartle to crash on engine oil left on the road. This allowed Bob McIntyre to comfortably win the 1957 Junior TT Race at an average speed of 94.99 mph.

The 1957 Lightweight TT Race held on the Clypse Course was over 10 laps and 107.90 miles and was dominated by Cecil Sandford riding for the F.B.Mondial marque and team-mate Sammy Miller. By lap 2, Sandford led Miller by 2 seconds and Tarquinio Provini, also riding for Mondial, in a distant 3rd place. By lap 7, Miller had caught up and on lap 9 passed Sandford between the Creg-ny-Baa and Ballacoar Corner for the lead. At Governor's Bridge on the last lap, Miller slipped off his Mondial, allowing Sandford to win the 1957 Lightweight TT Race at an average race speed of 75.80 mph from the MV Agusta pair of Luigi Taveri and Roberto Colombo. An exhausted Miller is forced to push-in his Mondial to finish in 5th place.

Despite a rain shower between races, the 1957 Ultra-Lightweight TT on the Clypse Course was a more closely contested race. At Parkfield Corner on lap 1, Luigi Taveri riding for MV Agusta led the Mondial of Sammy Miller, while Tarquinio Provini riding for Mondial and Carlo Ubbiali on a MV Agusta were in the mid-field chasing pack. At the Creg-ny-Baa on the first lap, Ubbiali caught up to the leaders to take 3rd place with Tarquinio Provini in 4th place, until Provini passed Ubbiali for 3rd place on the Whitebridge Hill on the end of the 1st lap of the Clypse Course. By the end of lap 2, Provini passed both Taveri and Miller for the lead and by the end of the 3rd lap had a 13-second lead and set the fastest lap of the race of 8 minutes and 41.8 seconds an average speed of 74.44 mph and won the 1957 Lightweight TT Race at an average race speed of 73.69 mph. On lap 8 at Hall Corner, Luigi Taveri slipped off his MV Agusta, but continued on and was passed by Ubbiali at Parkfield Corner on lap 9. The last lap is contested by Taveri in a "slipstream dog-fight" for 3rd place which is won by Lugi Taveri by less than 1 second from Miller and Sandford.

The 10 lap 1957 Sidecar Race also held on the Clypse Course was led from start to finish by the BMW outfit of Fritz Hillebrand and Manfred Grünwald. In 2nd place was Walter Schneider/H.Strauss, also with a BMW sidecar. The Norton outfit of Cyril Smith and E.J.Bliss passed the other works BMW outfit of Florian Camathias/J.Galliker on lap 4. At the Manx Arms on the last lap, the Norton of Smith and Bliss suffers big-end failure allowing Camathias and Galliker to retake 3rd place and give BMW a 1-2-3 victory in the 1957 Sidecar TT Race.

There was high expectations for the Blue Riband race of the Golden Jubilee TT with the 8 lap (301.86 miles) 1957 Senior TT Race. As Geoff Duke had been injured at Imola at an Easter race meeting the works ride in the factory Gilera team had passed to Bob McIntyre. During the 1955 Isle of Man TT, Duke was credited with the first lap of the Snaefell mountain course at an average speed of 100 mph. This was later revised by the official time-keepers at the TT Grandstand to 99.97 mph.

The 1957 Senior TT race was led by Bob McIntyre riding for Gilera and he beat the overall lap-record from a standing start in 22 minutes and 38.4 seconds at an average speed of 99.99 mph and was 0.6 seconds faster than the lap record set by Geoff Duke in the 1955 Senior TT Race. The main rival for winning the Senior TT race is John Surtees riding for MV Agusta who posts a time of 23 minutes and 17.4 seconds an average speed of 97.20 mph on the first lap. On the flying second lap, Bob McIntyre laps the Mountain Course in 22 minutes and 24.4 seconds an average speed of 101.03 mph, breaking the overall lap record and the first 100 mph lap. The feat is again repeated on the 3rd lap at an average speed of 100.54 mph and the 4th and 6th lap at an average speed of 101.12 and 100.35 mph respectively. By lap 4, Bob McIntyre led the 1957 Senior TT Race from John Surtees by 2 min and 10.2 seconds and is only 9.8 seconds behind Surtees on the road. By the end of lap 4, Bob McIntyre passed John Surtees on the road. However, Surtees repassed Bob McIntyre on the road on the Mountain Section as the Gilera team gave McIntyre signals to the slow the pace. The 1957 Senior TT Race was eventually won by Bob McIntyre in 3 hours, 2 minutes and 57.2 seconds at an average speed of 98.99 mph. The record breaking Senior TT Race and the Golden Jubilee celebrations were marred by the death of Charlie Salt who crashed a BSA motorcycle at Ballagarraghyn Corner and was killed during the later stages of the 1957 Senior TT Race.

== Race results ==
=== 1957 Isle of Man Junior TT 350cc final standings ===
3 June 1957 – 7 Laps (264.11 Miles) Mountain Course.

Place	Rider	Number	Country	Machine	Speed	Time	Points
1	(Scotland) Bob McIntyre		United Kingdom	Gilera	94.99 mph	2:46.50.2	8
2	(Australia) Keith Campbell		Australia	Moto Guzzi	92.95 mph	2:50.29.8	6
3	(Australia) Bob Brown		Australia	Gilera	92.34 mph	2:51.38.2	4
4	(United Kingdom) John Surtees		United Kingdom	MV Agusta	91.80 mph	2:52.37.6	3
5	(Australia) Eric Hinton		Australia	Norton	97.32 mph	2:54.50.0	2
6	(New Zealand) G.C.A (Peter) Murphy		New Zealand	Matchless	90.49 mph	2:55.08.4	1

=== 1957 Isle of Man Lightweight TT 250cc final standings ===
5 June 1957 – 10 Laps (107.90 miles) Clypse Course.

Place	Rider	Number	Country	Machine	Speed	Time	Points
1	(United Kingdom) Cecil Sandford		United Kingdom	Mondial	75.80 mph	1:25.04.0	8
2	(Switzerland) Luigi Taveri		Switzerland	MV Agusta	74.24 mph	1:25.04.0	6
3	(Italy) Roberto Colombo		Italy	MV Agusta	74.10 mph	1:27.21.8	4
4	(Czechoslovakia) František Bartoš		Czechoslovakia	Jawa	72.45 mph	1:29.22.4	3
5	(Northern Ireland) Sammy Miller		United Kingdom	Mondial	71.31 mph	1:30.47.0	2
6	(United Kingdom) Dave Chadwick		United Kingdom	MV Agusta	70.02 mph	1:32.28.0	1

=== 1957 Isle of Man Lightweight TT 125cc final standings ===
5 June 1957 – 10 Laps (107.90 miles) Clypse Course.

Place	Rider	Number	Country	Machine	Speed	Time	Points
1	(Italy) Tarquinio Provini		Italy	Mondial	73.69 mph	1:27:51.0	8
2	(Italy) Carlo Ubbiali		Italy	MV Agusta	73.22 mph	1:28:25.0	6
3	(Switzerland) Luigi Taveri		Switzerland	MV Agusta	71.44 mph	1:30:37.8	4
4	(Northern Ireland) Sammy Miller		United Kingdom	Mondial	71.43 mph	1:30:38.4	3
5	(United Kingdom) Cecil Sandford		United Kingdom	Mondial	71.42 mph	1:30:38.6	2
6	(Italy) Roberto Colombo		Italy	MV Agusta	71.24 mph	1:30:53.0	1

=== 1957 Sidecar TT final standings ===
5 June 1957 – 10 Laps (107.90 miles) Clypse Course.

Place	Rider	Number	Country	Machine	Speed	Time	Points
1	(West Germany) Fritz Hillebrand/M.Grünwald		West Germany	BMW	71.89 mph	1:30.03.4	8
2	(West Germany) Walter Schneider/H.Strauss		West Germany	BMW	71.21 mph	1:30.54.8	6
3	(Switzerland) Florian Camathias/J.Galliker		Switzerland	BMW	70.14 mph	1:32.18.2	4
4	(United Kingdom) Jackie Beeton/C.Billingham		United Kingdom	Norton	66.97 mph	1:36.42.2	3
5	(United Kingdom) Charlie Freeman/J.Chisnall		United Kingdom	Norton	64.82 mph	1:39.53.2	2
6	(United Kingdom) Peter Woolett/G.Loft		United Kingdom	Norton	63.58 mph	1:41.50.0	1

=== 1957 Isle of Man Senior TT 500cc final standings ===
Friday 7 June 1957 – 8 Laps (301.84 Miles) Mountain Course.

Place	Rider	Number	Country	Machine	Speed	Time	Points
1	(Scotland) Bob McIntyre		United Kingdom	Gilera	98.99 mph	3:02.57.2	8
2	(United Kingdom) John Surtees		United Kingdom	MV Agusta	97.86 mph	3:05.04.2	6
3	(Australia) Bob Brown		Australia	Gilera	95.81 mph	3:09.02.0	4
4	(United Kingdom) Dickie Dale		United Kingdom	Moto Guzzi	94.89 mph	3:10.52.4	3
5	(Australia) Keith Campbell		Australia	Moto Guzzi	93.27 mph	3:14.10.2	2
6	(United Kingdom) Alan Trow		United Kingdom	Norton	92.74 mph	3:15.17.0	1

- To date, this is the longest race in Grand Prix motorcycle racing history.

== Notes ==
- Monday Evening practice, Stanley Woods who has not lapped the TT Course for 18 years laps a Moto Guzzi motorcycle on a 'Reserve A' plate in 28 minutes and 22 seconds an average speed of 80 mph.
- The fine weather causes melting tar during practice and Jimmy Buchan riding a Junior Norton and Walter Zeller riding a BMW to crash at Laurel Bank. Derek Minter riding a Norton crashes at Milntown also because of the melting tar.
- Wednesday Evening practice, Terry Shepherd a replacement for Umberto Masetti riding an MV Agusta crashes at the Nook and breaks fingers in his left-hand. Also, Bob McIntyre riding a Gilera suffers a bird-strike. Walter Zeller riding for BMW tops the practice leaderboard with a lap of 23 minutes and 21.6 seconds.
- During lap 1 of the 1957 Junior TT Race, John Surtees stops on lap 1 to change a plug. Also on lap 1, Fred Wallis riding a BSA retires at Ramsey with engine problems and G.A.Northwood riding a Norton at Ballacraine. On lap 2, George T.Salt riding a Norton retires at Ballacraine, H.Ferguson riding an AJS at Creg-ny-Baa and J.Anderson at Bedstead Corner. By lap 3, A.King riding a Norton retires at Governor's Bridge and E Arthur Lavington riding a Velocette at Ballacrane with an engine problem. The Australian rider, R.Barker retires at Kirk Michael on lap 4 with a broken chain and Jack Brett riding a Norton at Guthrie's Memorial.
- The 1957 Lightweight TT held on the Clypse Course, F.E.Heath retires at Parkfield Corner on lap 1 and T.E.Rutherford riding a NSU slides-off at Ballacoar corner. On lap 2, Jackie Woods riding for NSU retires with engine problems. Also on lap 3, Carlo Ubbiali riding for MV Agusta retires with a dropped valve and Bob Brown retires on the Creg-ny-Baa 'back-road.'
- During the 1957 Ultra-Lightweight TT Race, also held on the Clypse Course, Fron Purslow riding a Triumph retires on lap 1 with a loose mud-guard. During lap 2, Ken Martin riding an Anelay motorcycle retires at the TT Grandstand and Ross Porter riding a MV Agusta retires at Creg-ny-Ba with a seized engine. On lap 3, Arthur Wheeler riding an MV Agusta retires with a broken exhaust rocker and Len Harfield at the TT Grandstand with gearbox problems.
- The 1957 Sidecar TT Race, held on the Clypse Course, on lap 1 E.Walker/D.G.Roberts, riding a Norton, retire with a split fuel-pump and P.J.R.Millward/S.Teather retire their Norton outfit at Morney Corner with broken suspension. During lap 3, B.N.Green/W.E.Rushmere retire at Edges Corner with broken suspension. The French driver, Jacques Drion and female passenger Inge Stoll retire with a broken hand-hold on their Norton sidecar. At Ballacoar Corner on lap 4, the Norton sidecar of Pip Harris/R.M.Campbell brush a bank and retire. On the last lap, Bill Boddice/Bill Canning crash at the 4th Milestone on Ballacarooin Hill.
- Fastest lap of the 1957 Sidecar TT Race was Fritz Hillebrand/M.Grunwald riding a BMW outfit in 8 minutes and 55.4 seconds an average speed of 72.55 mph.
- During the 8 lap, 1957 Senior TT Race, on lap 1, John Hempleman retires at the Mountain Box with ignition box problems. On lap 4, Walter Zeller riding a BMW retires at Ramsey with ignition problems and Dickie Dale stops at Sulby when his Moto Guzzi V8 suffers a piston seizure, but continues the race with the engine running on 7 cylinders. During lap 7, Jack Brett riding for Norton crashes at Sulby when the chain breaks and Eric Hinton crashes at Ballacraine. On lap 8, Dickie Dale's teammate, Keith Campbell riding for Moto Guzzi falls of at Ramsey after oil leaks on the rear-tyre and loses 3 minutes, but he continues and finishes in 5th place at an average race speed of 93.27 mph. Also on lap 8, Geoff Tanner riding a Norton runs out of petrol on the Mountain Section while holding 6th place and freewheels and pushes down the Mountain to finish in 28th place.
- The 1957 Golden Jubilee TT races were the last TT races to allow the use of full bid streamlining. The advantage of this kind of streamlining was self-evident to the contestants and resulted in the first six in the 125, 250, and Junior races all using this kind of streamlining. It was only in the Senior TT that two machines not using full bin streamlining finished in the first six. This was John Surtees' second on the 4-cylinder M.V. and Dicky Dale on the Guzzi Vee-8 who finished fourth. By 1958 a new set of regulations was brought in that banned all forms of streamlining that covered the front and back wheels of a solo racing motorcycle. With very little modification these regulations are still in force today.
