= 1955 Belgian motorcycle Grand Prix =

(Belgium) 1955 Belgian Grand Prix
Race details
- Race 5 of 8 races in the 1955 Grand Prix motorcycle racing season
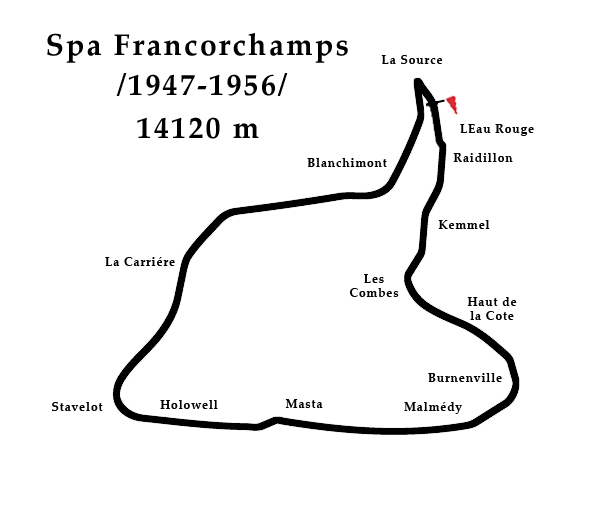
- Date: 3 July 1955
- Location: Circuit de Spa-Francorchamps
- Course: Permanent racing facility; 14.120 km (8.774 mi)

500cc
- Rider
Fastest lap
Rider	(United Kingdom) Geoff Duke	Gilera
Time	4:35.7	
Podium
First	(Italy) Giuseppe Colnago	Gilera
Second	(France) Pierre Monneret	Gilera
Third	(Belgium) Léon Martin	Gilera

350cc
- Rider
Fastest lap
Rider	(United Kingdom) Bill Lomas	Moto Guzzi
Time	4:53.6	
Podium
First	(United Kingdom) Bill Lomas	Moto Guzzi
Second	(West Germany) August Hobl	DKW
Third	(Australia) Keith Campbell	Norton

Sidecar (B2A)
- Rider
Fastest lap
Rider	(United Kingdom) Cyril Smith	Norton
Time	5:20.0	
Podium
First	(West Germany) Wilhelm Noll	BMW
Second	(West Germany) Willi Faust	BMW
Third	(West Germany) Walter Schneider	BMW

The 1955 Belgian motorcycle Grand Prix was the fifth round of the 1955 Grand Prix motorcycle racing season. It took place on 3 July 1955 at the Circuit de Spa-Francorchamps.

== 500 cc classification ==
Pos	Rider	Manufacturer	Laps	Time	Points
1	(Italy) Giuseppe Colnago	Gilera	15	1:10:51.1	8
2	(France) Pierre Monneret	Gilera	15	+43.8	6
3	(Belgium) Léon Martin	Gilera	15	+2:35.6	4
4	(Italy) Duilio Agostini	Moto Guzzi			3
5	(Belgium) Auguste Goffin	Norton			2
6	(United Kingdom) John Storr	Norton			1
7	(Australia) Jack Ahearn	Norton			
8	(New Zealand) Bill Aislabie	Norton			
9	(United Kingdom) Bob Matthews	Norton			
10	(Belgium) Edouard Texidor	Norton			
11	(Australia) Bob Brown	Matchless			
12	(New Zealand) John Hempleman	Norton			
13	(United Kingdom) Phil Heath	Norton			
14	(United Kingdom) Peter Davey	Norton			
15	(United Kingdom) Arthur Wheeler	Matchless			
16	(South Africa) Eddie Grant	Norton			
17	(New Zealand) Fred Cook	Matchless			

== 350 cc classification ==
Pos	Rider	Manufacturer	Laps	Time	Points
1	(United Kingdom) Bill Lomas	Moto Guzzi	11	54:47.7	8
2	(West Germany) August Hobl	DKW	11	+14.9	6
3	(Australia) Keith Campbell	Norton	11	+2:14.2	4
4	(United Kingdom) Cecil Sandford	Moto Guzzi			3
5	(Italy) Roberto Colombo	Moto Guzzi			2
6	(West Germany) Hans Bartl	DKW			1
7	(West Germany) Hans Baltisberger	NSU			
8	(Belgium) Auguste Goffin	Norton			
9	(Australia) Jack Ahearn	Norton			
10	(Belgium) Jules Nies	Norton			
11	(Australia) Bob Brown	AJS			
12	(New Zealand) John Hempleman	Norton			
13	(United Kingdom) Tommy Wood	Norton			
14	(United Kingdom) Arthur Wheeler	AJS			
15	(New Zealand) Fred Cook	AJS			
16	(United Kingdom) Bob Matthews	Norton			
17	(Belgium) Edouard Texidor	AJS			
18	(Belgium) Pierre Vervroegen	Norton			
19	A. van Fleteren	AJS			

== Sidecar classification ==
Pos	Rider	Passenger	Manufacturer	Laps	Time	Points
1	(West Germany) Wilhelm Noll	(West Germany) Fritz Cron	BMW	7	38:21.2	8
2	(West Germany) Willi Faust	(West Germany) Karl Remmert	BMW	7	+1.1	6
3	(West Germany) Walter Schneider	(West Germany) Hans Strauss	BMW	7	+47.3	4
4	(Belgium) Julien Deronne	(Belgium) Bruno Leys	BMW			3
5	(United Kingdom) Pip Harris	(United Kingdom) Ray Campbell	Norton			2
6	(France) Jacques Drion	(West Germany) Inge Stoll	Norton			1
7	(France) Jean Murit	(Morocco) Francis Flahaut	Norton			
8	(Switzerland) Florian Camathias	(Switzerland) Maurice Büla	BMW			
9	(Belgium) Marcel Masuy	?	Norton			
10	(Belgium) Pierre Vervroegen	(Belgium) Raymond Bogaert	Norton			
11	"Rausens"	?	Norton			
12	T. Gobel	?	Norton			
13	(United Kingdom) Eric Oliver	(United Kingdom) Eric Bliss	Norton			

Previous race: 1955 German Grand Prix	FIM Grand Prix World Championship; 1955 season	Next race: 1955 Dutch TT
Previous race: 1954 Belgian Grand Prix	Belgian Grand Prix	Next race: 1956 Belgian Grand Prix
