= Duilio Agostini =

Italian motorcycle racer (1926–2008)

- Nationality: Italian
- Born: 8 April 1926; Mandello del Lario, Italy
Motorcycle racing career statistics
Grand Prix motorcycle racing
Active years	1953–1955
First race	1953 350cc Nations Grand Prix
Last race	1955 500cc Belgium Grand Prix
First win	1955 350cc French Grand Prix
Last win	1955 350cc French Grand Prix
Team	Moto Guzzi
Starts / Wins / Podiums / Poles / F. laps / Points; 5 / 1 / 3 / N/A / 0 / 24

Duilio Agostini (8 April 1926 – 12 April 2008) was an Italian Grand Prix motorcycle road racer. He had his best year in 1955 when he won the 350cc French Grand Prix and finished the season in seventh place in the 350cc world championship. He is not related to Grand Prix motorcycle racing legend Giacomo Agostini.

== Biography ==
Duilio Agostini was born to a well off family that owned the hotel restaurant Al Porto, now known as the Giardinetto, at Mandello del Lario on the shores of Lake Como; Guests included many important personalities linked to motorcycling, such as Omobono Tenni, Stanley Woods, Terzo Bandini, Primo Moretti and Ugo Prini.

Agostini worked for Moto Guzzi first in the customer service department, and finally, in 1947, as the official test rider alongside of Engineer Giulio Cesare Carcano.

Agostini's first race, which he won, was at Asola, Lombardy riding a borrowed Condor 500. From that moment, his racing career began and he gained many podium positions and victories. In 1953 he won first overall in the Milano-Taranto on a Moto Guzzi Dondolino. That year, he also won the Italian Championship in the Second Category of the 500cc class. In 1954 he became an official Moto Guzzi rider both in the 250cc class and in the 350 class, as they used to do in those days, with the Bialbero (twin cam). That year he was victorious winning the Italian 250cc Seniors (Campionato Italiano Seniores).

Whilst at the 1955 Isle of Man TT, Agostini met an Australian, Margaret Ward, who later became his wife. They had two daughters, Alis, born in 1957, and Lindy, born in 1962.

Agostini's best year was 1955 when he won the French motorcycle Grand Prix and ended the season in seventh place in the 350cc World Championship.

In 1957, Agostini retired from racing and devoted himself to his workshop and Moto Guzzi dealership in Mandello del Lario.

In the 1970s, Agostini founded a team for endurance racing using the Moto Guzzi V7 Sport. The race development projects led to the manufacture of many special components that were later marketed by the dealership. In the 70's, together with a group of enthusiasts, formed a new motorcycle club, the Moto Club Carlo Guzzi, of which he was president for many years. Together with the club he organised the first international Moto Guzzi rallies in Mandello del Lario. The rallies were held every two years and giving rise to a tradition which continued over the years. The last rally organised by Duilio in collaboration with the Moto Club took place in September 1989.

In 1993, Agostini retired from the dealership leaving it totally in the hands of his daughter Alis who already managed it from 1981, initially with her sister Lindy. After a life dedicated to the brand of Mandello he died April 12, 2008, following a serious illness.

== Race results ==
=== 1950 ===
- 16 April Circuito di Asola (Moto Guzzi 500) 1st place
- 18 May Circuito di Lodi (Moto Guzzi 500) 4th place and fastest lap
- 28 May Circuito di Codogno (Moto Guzzi 500 ) 1st place and fastest lap
- 18 June Circuito di Castano Primo (Moto Guzzi 500) 1st place

=== 1951 ===
- 15 April Circuito di Finale Emilia ( Moto Guzzi 500 ) 3rd place
- 20 May Circuito di San Secondo ad Asti ( Moto Guzzi 500 ) 5th place
- 3 June Circuito di Busto Arsizio ( Moto Guzzi 500 ) 3rd place
- 9 September Circuito di Asola (Moto Guzzi 500 ) 2nd place
- 30 September Circuito di Castelfranco Veneto ( Moto Guzzi 500 ) 1st place
- 7 October Circuito di La Spezia ( Moto Guzzi 500 ) 1st place
- 21 October Autodromo di Modena (Moto Guzzi 500 ) retired
- Italian Championship second category ( Moto Guzzi 500 ) 5th place

=== 1952 ===
- 13 April Circuito di Cattolica (Moto Guzzi 500 ) retired
- 25 April Autodromo di Modena (Moto Guzzi 500 ) 2nd place
- 2 June Circuito di Gradisca (Moto Guzzi 500 ) retired
- 15 June Milano Taranto (Moto Guzzi 500 ) retired
- 6 June Circuito di Fossano (Moto Guzzi 500) retired
- 21 September Circuito di Castelfranco Veneto (Moto Guzzi 500 ) 1st place
- Italian Championship second category ( Moto Guzzi 500 ) 5th place

=== 1953 ===
- 3 May Circuito di Crema (Moto Guzzi 500 ) 1st place and fastest lap
- 10 May Circuito delle mura di Bergamo (Moto Guzzi 500 ) 1st place and fastest lap
- 14 June Circuito di Busto Arsizio ( Moto Guzzi 500 ) 1st place and fastest lap
- 21 June Milano Taranto ( Moto Guzzi 500 ) 1st Absolute
- 12 July Coppa del mare Livorno ( Moto Guzzi 500 ) 1st place
- 16 August Circuito di Luino (Moto Guzzi 500 ) retired but had the fastest lap
- 6 September GP delle Nazioni a Monza ( Moto Guzzi 350 ) 3rd place
- World Championship (Moto Guzzi 350 ) 10th place
- Italian Championship second category ( Moto Guzzi 350 ) 1st place

=== 1954 ===
- 28 March Autodromo di Modena ( Moto Guzzi 250 ) 3rd place
- 28 March Autodromo di Modena ( Moto Guzzi 500) retired
- 19 April Circuito di Ferrara ( Moto Guzzi 250 ) 2nd place
- 25 April Coppa d’oro Shell at Imola ( Moto Guzzi 250 ) retired but had the fastest lap
- 23 May Autodromo Monza ( Moto Guzzi 250 ) 3rd place
- 17 June Circuito di Piacenza ( Moto Guzzi 250 ) 1st place
- 20 June Milano Taranto ( Moto Guzzi 500 ) retired
- 25 July Circuito di Locarno ( Moto Guzzi 250 ) 1st place
- 25 July Circuito di Locarno (Moto Guzzi 500) retired
- 1 August Circuito di Senigalia ( Moto Guzzi 350 ) 1st place
- 12 September GP delle Nazioni Monza ( Moto Guzzi 350 ) 4th place
- 26 September Circuito di Codogno ( Moto Guzzi 250) 2nd place and the fastest lap
- 3 October Spanish GP ( Moto Guzzi 350 ) 2nd place
- 3 October Spanish GP ( Moto Guzzi 500) retired
- World Championship ( Moto Guzzi 350 ) 7th place
- Italian Championship seniors ( Moto Guzzi 250 ) 1st place

=== 1955 ===
- 11 April Coppa d’oro Shell at Imola (Moto Guzzi 350) retired
- 11 April Coppa d’oro Shell at Imola (Moto Guzzi 500) retired
- 1 May Spanish GP (Moto Guzzi 500) retired
- 15 May French GP at Reims (Moto Guzzi 350) 1st place and the fastest lap
- 6 June Isle of Man TT (Moto Guzzi 350) 8th place
- 3 July Belgian GP at Spa (Moto Guzzi 350) retired
- 3 July Belgian GP at Spa (Moto Guzzi 500) 4th place
- 16 July Dutch GP at Assen (Moto Guzzi 350) retired
- 11 August Ulster GP Ireland (Moto Guzzi 350) retired
- 4 September GP delle Nazioni at Monza (Moto Guzzi 350) retired
- World Championship (Guzzi 350) 7th place
- World Championship (Guzzi 500) 16th place

=== 1956 ===
- 2 April Coppa d’oro Shell at Imola (Moto Guzzi 350) 6th place
- 29 April Gran premio della Sarre at St. Wendel (Moto Guzzi 500) 4th place
- 13 May Hockenheim Circuit (Moto Guzzi 350) retired
- 13 May Hockenheim Circuit (Guzzi 500) 5th place
- 4 June Isle of Man TT (Moto Guzzi 350) 9th place
- 30 June Dutch GP at Assen (Moto Guzzi 350) 7th place
- 8 July Belgian GP at Spa (Moto Guzzi 350) retired
- 9 September GP delle Nazioni at Monza (Moto Guzzi 350) 8th place

=== 1957 ===
- 19 March Circuito di Siracusa (motoGuzzi 350) retired
- 15 September Autodromo di Modena (Moto Guzzi 350) 4th place
- Italian Championship Seniors (Moto Guzzi 350) 8th place
