= 1955 German motorcycle Grand Prix =

(West Germany) 1955 German Grand Prix
Race details
- Race 4 of 8 races in the 1955 Grand Prix motorcycle racing season
- Date: 26 June 1955
- Location: Nürburgring
- Course: Permanent racing facility; 22.810 km (14.173 mi)

500cc
- Rider
Fastest lap
Rider	(United Kingdom) Geoff Duke	Gilera
Time	10:23.3	
Podium
First	(United Kingdom) Geoff Duke	Gilera
Second	(West Germany) Walter Zeller	BMW
Third	(Italy) Carlo Bandirola	MV Agusta

350cc
- Rider
Fastest lap
Rider	(United Kingdom) Bill Lomas	Moto Guzzi
Time	10:35.0	
Podium
First	(United Kingdom) Bill Lomas	Moto Guzzi
Second	(West Germany) August Hobl	DKW
Third	(United Kingdom) John Surtees	Mondial

250cc
- Rider
Fastest lap
Rider	(West Germany) Hermann Paul Müller	NSU
Time	10:56.7	
Podium
First	(West Germany) Hermann Paul Müller	NSU
Second	(West Germany) Wolfgang Brandt	NSU
Third	(United Kingdom) Cecil Sandford	Moto Guzzi

125cc
- Rider
Fastest lap
Rider	(Italy) Carlo Ubbiali	MV Agusta
Time	12:18.2	
Podium
First	(Italy) Carlo Ubbiali	MV Agusta
Second	(Switzerland) Luigi Taveri	MV Agusta
Third	(Italy) Remo Venturi	MV Agusta

Sidecar (B2A)
- Rider
Fastest lap
Rider	(West Germany) Willi Faust	BMW
Time	11:37.0	
Podium
First	(West Germany) Willi Faust	BMW
Second	(West Germany) Wilhelm Noll	BMW
Third	(West Germany) Walter Schneider	BMW

The 1955 German motorcycle Grand Prix was the fourth round of the 1955 Grand Prix motorcycle racing season. It took place on 26 June 1955 at the Nürburgring circuit.

== 500 cc classification ==
Pos	Rider	Manufacturer	Laps	Time	Points
1	(United Kingdom) Geoff Duke	Gilera	9	1:34:06.1	8
2	(West Germany) Walter Zeller	BMW	9	+24.3	6
3	(Italy) Carlo Bandirola	MV Agusta	9	+3:28.9	4
4	(Italy) Umberto Masetti	MV Agusta			3
5	(Italy) Giuseppe Colnago	Gilera			2
6	(Australia) Jack Ahearn	Norton			1
7	(West Germany) Hans-Günter Jäger	Norton			
8	(Sweden) Sven Andersson	Norton			
9	(Sweden) Kuno Johansson	Matchless			
10	(West Germany) Ernst Hiller	Matchless			
11	(United Kingdom) Bob Matthews	Norton			
12	(East Germany) Hans-Joachim Scheel	Norton			
13	H. Schreiber	Norton			
14	(United Kingdom) Phil Heath	Norton			
15	H. Scheifel	Norton			

== 350 cc classification ==
Pos	Rider	Manufacturer	Laps	Time	Points
1	(United Kingdom) Bill Lomas	Moto Guzzi	7	1:14:52.1	8
2	(West Germany) August Hobl	DKW	7	+13.0	6
3	(United Kingdom) John Surtees	Norton	7	+16.3	4
4	(United Kingdom) Cecil Sandford	Moto Guzzi			3
5	(Australia) Ken Kavanagh	Moto Guzzi			2
6	(West Germany) Karl Hofmann	DKW			1
7	(West Germany) Siegfried Wünsche	DKW			
8	(Italy) Carlo Bandirola	MV Agusta			
9	(Australia) Keith Campbell	Norton			
10	(Australia) Jack Ahearn	Norton			
11	(New Zealand) Peter Murphy	AJS			
12	(New Zealand) Bill Aislabie	AJS			
13	(West Germany) Helmut Hallmeier	NSU			
14	G. Bodmer	DKW			
15	H. Hötzer	AJS			
16	(United Kingdom) Arthur Wheeler	AJS			
17	(Australia) Bob Brown	AJS			
18	K. Bähr	Horex			
19	(West Germany) Günther Borgesdiek	Norton			
20	(West Germany) Bruno Böhrer	Parilla			
21	(United Kingdom) Eric Houseley	AJS			
22	H. Kauret	AJS			
23	A. Huber	AJS			
24	(West Germany) Werner Mazanec	AJS			
25	(West Germany) Rudi Stein	AJS			

== 250 cc classification ==
Pos	Rider	Manufacturer	Laps	Time	Points
1	(West Germany) Hermann Paul Müller	NSU	6	1:06:19.6	8
2	(West Germany) Wolfgang Brandt	NSU	6	+1:02.0	6
3	(United Kingdom) Cecil Sandford	Moto Guzzi	6	+1:05.7	4
4	(Switzerland) Luigi Taveri	MV Agusta			3
5	(United Kingdom) Arthur Wheeler	Moto Guzzi			2
6	(West Germany) Helmut Hallmeier	NSU			1
7	(Italy) Roberto Colombo	Moto Guzzi			
8	(West Germany) Fritz Kläger	NSU			
9	(West Germany) Roland Heck	NSU			
10	(West Germany) Karl-Julius Holthaus	NSU			
11	(West Germany) Horst Kassner	NSU			
12	(West Germany) Rudi Stein	NSU			
13	(Switzerland) Florian Camathias	NSU			
14	(West Germany) Rudi Meier	NSU			
15	(East Germany) Hans-Joachim Scheel	AWO			
16	(West Germany) Siegfried Lohmann	Adler			
17	(West Germany) Ludwig Malchus	NSU			
18	(United Kingdom) Basil Keys	Norton			
19	W. Kesberg	NSU			

== 125cc classification ==
Pos	Rider	Manufacturer	Laps	Time/Retired	Points
1	(Italy) Carlo Ubbiali	MV Agusta	5	1:01:56.5	8
2	(Switzerland) Luigi Taveri	MV Agusta	5	+0.8	6
3	(Italy) Remo Venturi	MV Agusta	5	+1.6	4
4	(West Germany) Karl Lottes	MV Agusta	5	+1:44.4	3
5	(East Germany) Bernhard Petruschke	IFA	5	+2:46.0	2
6	(East Germany) Erhart Krumpholz	IFA	5	+3:14.5	1
7	(West Germany) H. Bähr	MV Agusta			
8	(West Germany) Willi Scheidhauer	MV Agusta			
9	(Austria) Werner Funk	MV Agusta			
10	(Netherlands) Gerrit Dupont	MV Agusta			
11	(West Germany) Erich Wünsche	MV Agusta			
14 starters, 11 finishers

== Sidecar classification ==
Pos	Rider	Passenger	Manufacturer	Laps	Time	Points
1	(West Germany) Willi Faust	(West Germany) Karl Remmert	BMW	5	58:33.8	8
2	(West Germany) Wilhelm Noll	(West Germany) Fritz Cron	BMW	5	+1:03.7	6
3	(West Germany) Walter Schneider	(West Germany) Manfred Grunwald	BMW	5	+1:52.0	4
4	(France) Jacques Drion	(West Germany) Inge Stoll	Norton			3
5	(Australia) Bob Mitchell	(Australia) Max George	Norton			2
6	(France) Jean Murit	(Morocco) Francis Flahaut	Norton			1
7	(West Germany) Helmut Fath	(West Germany) Emil Ohr	BMW			
8	(West Germany) Willy Mäder	(West Germany) Erich Schöttle	Norton			
9	(West Germany) Fritz Seeber	(West Germany) Franz Heiss	BMW			
10	(Belgium) Marcel Masuy	?	Norton			
11	(East Germany) Fritz Bagge	?	Norton			
12	(West Germany) Friedrich Staschel	(East Germany) Edgar Perduss	BMW			
13	(West Germany) Loni Neussner	?	Norton			
14	V. Tongratz	?	Norton			
15	T. Gobel	?	Norton			
16	W. Nowak	?	Norton			
17	(Switzerland) Hans Haldemann	(Switzerland) Herbert Läderach	Norton			

Previous race: 1955 Isle of Man TT	FIM Grand Prix World Championship; 1955 season	Next race: 1955 Belgian Grand Prix
Previous race: 1954 German Grand Prix	German Grand Prix	Next race: 1956 German Grand Prix
