= Giuseppe Colnago =

Italian motorcycle racer (1923–2000)

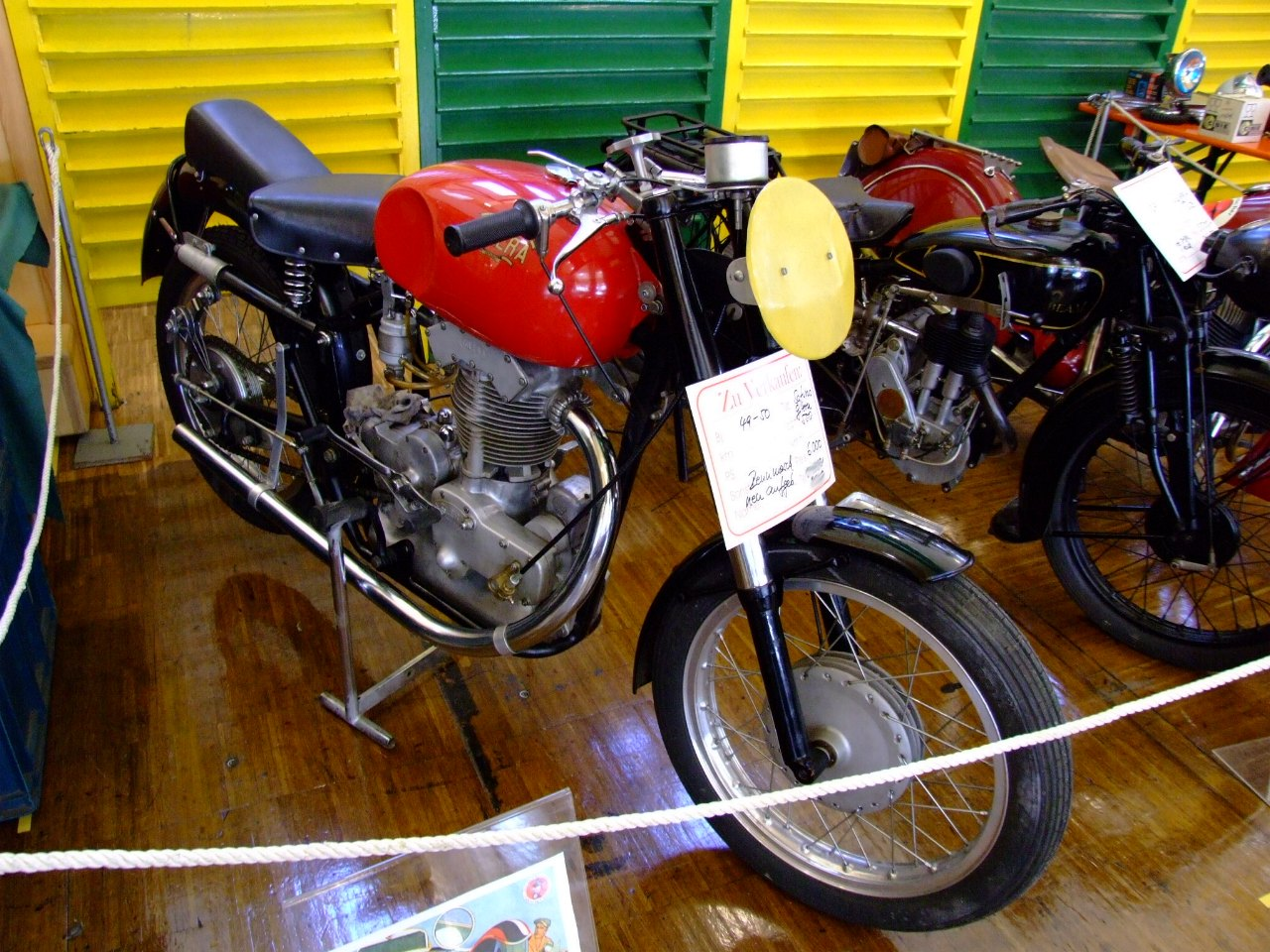
- Gileras 500cc
- Nationality: Italian
Motorcycle racing career statistics
Grand Prix motorcycle racing
Active years	1952 - 1953, 1955, 1957
First race	1952 500cc Nations Grand Prix
Last race	1957 350cc Nations Grand Prix
First win	1955 500cc Belgian Grand Prix
Last win	1955 500cc Belgian Grand Prix
Team(s)	Gilera, Moto Guzzi
Starts / Wins / Podiums / Poles / F. laps / Points; 10 / 1 / 2 / N/A / N/A / 33

Giuseppe Colnago (15 December 1923 - 22 December 2000) was an Italian professional Grand Prix motorcycle road racer.

Born in Caponago, Colnago had his best year in 1955 when he won the 500cc Belgian Grand Prix and finished the season in fourth place in the 500cc world championship. He was one of the few people to race the famous Moto Guzzi V8 race bike.
