= 1955 Spanish motorcycle Grand Prix =

(Spain) 1955 Spanish Grand Prix
Race details
- Race 1 of 8 races in the 1955 Grand Prix motorcycle racing season
- Date: 1 May 1955
- Location: Montjuïc circuit
- Course: Public roads; 3.791 km (2.356 mi)

500cc
- Rider
Fastest lap
Rider	(Australia) Ken Kavanagh	Moto Guzzi
Time	2:02.7	
Podium
First	(Republic of Ireland) Reg Armstrong	Gilera
Second	(Italy) Carlo Bandirola	MV Agusta
Third	(Italy) Umberto Masetti	MV Agusta

125cc
- Rider
Fastest lap
Rider	(Italy) Romolo Ferri	Mondial
Time	2:09.0	
Podium
First	(Switzerland) Luigi Taveri	MV Agusta
Second	(Italy) Romolo Ferri	Mondial
Third	(Italy) Carlo Ubbiali	MV Agusta

Sidecar (B2A)
- Rider
Fastest lap
Rider	(West Germany) Willi Faust	BMW
Time	2:15.9	
Podium
First	(West Germany) Willi Faust	BMW
Second	(United Kingdom) Cyril Smith	Norton
Third	(United Kingdom) Eric Oliver	Norton

The 1955 Spanish motorcycle Grand Prix was the first round of the 1955 Grand Prix motorcycle racing season. It took place on 1 May 1955 at the Montjuïc circuit.

== 500 cc classification ==
Pos	Rider	Manufacturer	Laps	Time	Points
1	(Republic of Ireland) Reg Armstrong	Gilera	53	1:50:20.4	8
2	(Italy) Carlo Bandirola	MV Agusta	53	+31.9	6
3	(Italy) Umberto Masetti	MV Agusta	53	+1:19.9	4
4	(Italy) Orlando Valdinoci	Gilera			3
5	(Italy) Nello Pagani	MV Agusta			2
6	(Italy) Tito Forconi	MV Agusta			1
7	(Italy) Giuseppe Colnago	Gilera			
8	(Spain) Alfredo Flores	Norton			

== 125cc classification ==
Pos	Rider	Manufacturer	Laps	Time/Retired	Points
1	(Switzerland) Luigi Taveri	MV Agusta	27	58:59.9	8
2	(Italy) Romolo Ferri	Mondial	27	+34.7	6
3	(Italy) Carlo Ubbiali	MV Agusta	27	+34.9	4
4	(Italy) Giuseppe Lattanzi	Mondial	27	+1:03.9	3
5	(Italy) Angelo Copeta	MV Agusta	27	+2:05.7	2
6	(Spain) Marcelo Cama	Montesa	27	+2:06.6	1
7	(Spain) Juan Atorrasagasti	MV Agusta			
8	(Spain) Francisco González	Montesa			
9	(Spain) Carlos del Val	Mondial			
10	(Spain) Enrico Sirera	Montesa			
15 starters, 11 finishers

== Sidecar classification ==
Pos	Rider	Passenger	Manufacturer	Laps	Time	Points
1	(West Germany) Willi Faust	(West Germany) Karl Remmert	BMW	27	1:02:02.9	8
2	(United Kingdom) Cyril Smith	(United Kingdom) Stanley Dibben	Norton	27	+59.5	6
3	(United Kingdom) Eric Oliver	(United Kingdom) Eric Bliss	Norton	27	+2:18.9	4
4	(West Germany) Rudolf Koch	(West Germany) Christian Wirth	BMW			3
5	(Italy) Ernesto Merlo	(Italy) Vittorio Mussa	Gilera			2
6	(Switzerland) Roland Benz	(Switzerland) Jakob Kuchler	Norton			1
7	(United Kingdom) Fron Purslow	(United Kingdom) Alan Goodwin	BSA			
8	(United Kingdom) Bill Beevers	(United Kingdom) Brian Morris	Norton			
9	(Italy) Luigi Marcelli	(Italy) Lorenzo Dobelli	Norton			

Previous race: 1954 Spanish Grand Prix	FIM Grand Prix World Championship; 1955 season	Next race: 1955 French Grand Prix
Previous race: 1954 Spanish Grand Prix	Spanish Grand Prix	Next race: 1957 Spanish Grand Prix
