= 1955 French motorcycle Grand Prix =

(France) 1955 French Grand Prix
Race details
- Race 2 of 8 races in the 1955 Grand Prix motorcycle racing season
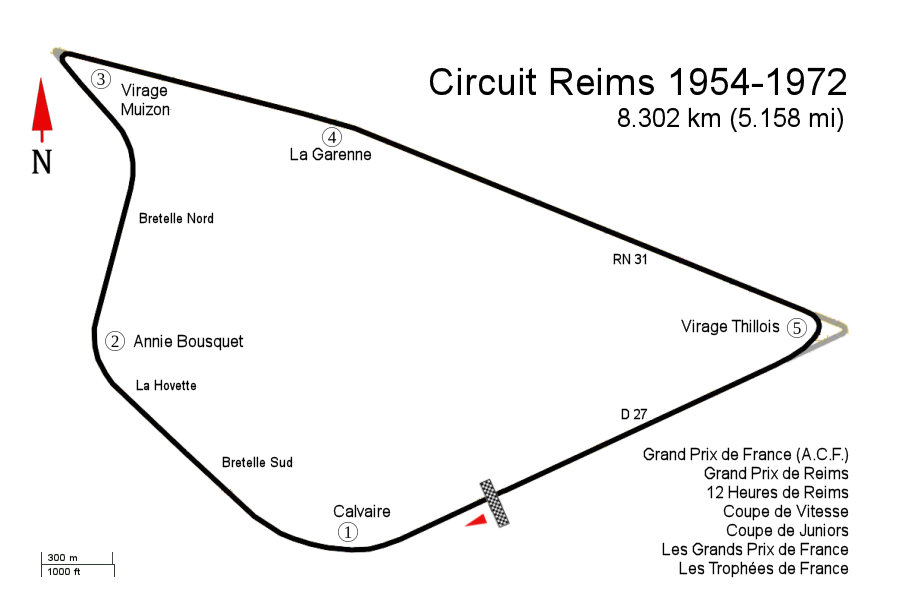
- Date: 15 May 1955
- Location: Reims-Gueux
- Course: Public roads; 8.301 km (5.158 mi)

500cc
- Rider
Fastest lap
Rider	(United Kingdom) Geoff Duke	Gilera
Time	2:39.0	
Podium
First	(United Kingdom) Geoff Duke	Gilera
Second	(Italy) Libero Liberati	Gilera
Third	(Republic of Ireland) Reg Armstrong	Gilera

350cc
- Rider
Fastest lap
Rider	(Italy) Duilio Agostini	Moto Guzzi
Time	3:02.0	
Podium
First	(Italy) Duilio Agostini	Moto Guzzi
Second	(United Kingdom) Dickie Dale	Moto Guzzi
Third	(Italy) Roberto Colombo	Moto Guzzi

125cc
- Rider
Fastest lap
Rider	(Italy) Romolo Ferri	Mondial
Time	3:16.8	
Podium
First	(Italy) Carlo Ubbiali	MV Agusta
Second	(Switzerland) Luigi Taveri	MV Agusta
Third	(Italy) Giuseppe Lattanzi	Mondial

The 1955 French motorcycle Grand Prix was the second round of the 1955 Grand Prix motorcycle racing season. It took place on 15 May 1955 at the Reims-Gueux circuit.

== 500 cc classification ==
Pos	Rider	Manufacturer	Laps	Time	Points
1	(United Kingdom) Geoff Duke	Gilera	30	1:22:52.8	8
2	(Italy) Libero Liberati	Gilera	30	+2:00.2	6
3	(Republic of Ireland) Reg Armstrong	Gilera	30	+2:22.4	4
4	(Italy) Tito Forconi	MV Agusta			3
5	(France) Jacques Collot	Norton			2
6	(Belgium) Firmin Dauwe	Norton			1
7	(Switzerland) Florian Camathias	Norton			
8	(France) Marcel Beauvais	Norton			
9	(France) Jean-Pierre Bayle	Norton			

== 350 cc classification ==
Pos	Rider	Manufacturer	Laps	Time	Points
1	(Italy) Duilio Agostini	Moto Guzzi	24	1:16:16.5	8
2	(United Kingdom) Dickie Dale	Moto Guzzi	24	+1.2	6
3	(Italy) Roberto Colombo	Moto Guzzi	24	+1:33.8	4
4	(Belgium) Auguste Goffin	Norton			3
5	(New Zealand) Peter Murphy	AJS			2
6	(France) Jacques Collot	Norton			1
7	(United Kingdom) John Storr	Norton			
8	(Morocco) Francis Flahaut	Norton			
9	(United Kingdom) Robin Fitton	Velocette			
10	(West Germany) Bruno Böhrer	Parilla			
11	(United Kingdom) Tommy Wood	Norton			
12	(Switzerland) Hans Haldemann	Norton			
13	P. Whelan	AJS			
14	(France) René Guérin	Norton			

== 125cc classification ==
Pos	Rider	Manufacturer	Laps	Time/Retired	Points
1	(Italy) Carlo Ubbiali	MV Agusta	12	40:29.8	8
2	(Switzerland) Luigi Taveri	MV Agusta	12	+18.8	6
3	(Italy) Giuseppe Lattanzi	Mondial	12	+18.9	4
4	(Italy) Tarquinio Provini	Mondial	12	+30.8	3
5	(Italy) Angelo Copeta	MV Agusta	12	+1:09.6	2
6	(Italy) Romolo Ferri	Mondial	11	+1 lap	1
7	(West Germany) Otto Krebs	Mondial			
8	(United Kingdom) Bill Webster	MV Agusta			
9	(West Germany) Karl Kronmüller	MV Agusta			
10	(West Germany) Willi Scheidhauer	MV Agusta			
14 starters, 10 finishers

Previous race: 1955 Spanish Grand Prix	FIM Grand Prix World Championship; 1955 season	Next race: 1955 Isle of Man TT
Previous race: 1954 French Grand Prix	French Grand Prix	Next race: 1958 French Grand Prix
