= 1955 Nations motorcycle Grand Prix =

(Italy) 1955 Nations Grand Prix
Race details
- Race 8 of 8 races in the 1955 Grand Prix motorcycle racing season
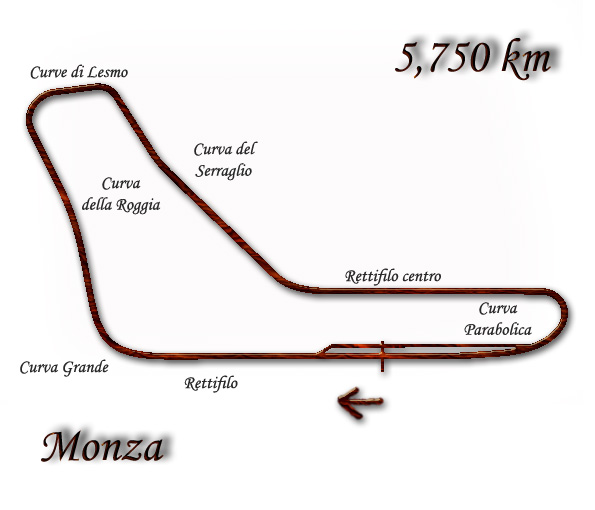
- Date: 4 September 1955
- Location: Autodromo Nazionale Monza
- Course: Permanent racing facility; 5.750 km (3.573 mi)

500cc
- Rider
Fastest lap
Rider	(United Kingdom) Geoff Duke	Gilera
Time	1:54.1	
Podium
First	(Italy) Umberto Masetti	MV Agusta
Second	(Republic of Ireland) Reg Armstrong	Gilera
Third	(United Kingdom) Geoff Duke	Gilera

350cc
- Rider
Fastest lap
Rider	(United Kingdom) Bill Lomas	Moto Guzzi
Time	2:00.4	
Podium
First	(United Kingdom) Dickie Dale	Moto Guzzi
Second	(United Kingdom) Bill Lomas	Moto Guzzi
Third	(Australia) Ken Kavanagh	Moto Guzzi

250cc
- Rider
Fastest lap
Rider	(West Germany) Hans Baltisberger	NSU
Time	2:04.9	
Podium
First	(Italy) Carlo Ubbiali	MV Agusta
Second	(West Germany) Hans Baltisberger	NSU
Third	(United Kingdom) Sammy Miller	NSU

125cc
- Rider
Fastest lap
Rider	(Italy) Carlo Ubbiali	MV Agusta
Time	2:11.9	
Podium
First	(Italy) Carlo Ubbiali	MV Agusta
Second	(Italy) Remo Venturi	MV Agusta
Third	(Italy) Angelo Copeta	MV Agusta

Sidecar (B2A)
- Rider
Fastest lap
Rider	(Italy) A. Milani	Gilera
Time	2:12.9	
Podium
First	(West Germany) Wilhelm Noll	BMW
Second	(West Germany) Walter Schneider	BMW
Third	(France) Jacques Drion	Norton

The 1955 Nations motorcycle Grand Prix was the eighth and final round of the 1955 Grand Prix motorcycle racing season. It took place on 4 September 1955 at the Autodromo Nazionale Monza.

== 500 cc classification ==
Pos	Rider	Manufacturer	Laps	Time	Points
1	(Italy) Umberto Masetti	MV Agusta	35	1:08:04.1	8
2	(Republic of Ireland) Reg Armstrong	Gilera	35	+0.5	6
3	(United Kingdom) Geoff Duke	Gilera	35	+1.6	4
4	(Italy) Giuseppe Colnago	Gilera			3
5	(Italy) Alfredo Milani	Gilera			2
6	(West Germany) Ernst Riedelbauch	BMW			1
7	(Austria) Gerold Klinger	BMW			
8	(United Kingdom) Bill Hall	Norton			
9	(Italy) Enrico Galante	Norton			
10	(Italy) A. Cirelli	Gilera			

== 350 cc classification ==
Pos	Rider	Manufacturer	Laps	Time	Points
1	(United Kingdom) Dickie Dale	Moto Guzzi	27	55:21.3	8
2	(United Kingdom) Bill Lomas	Moto Guzzi	27	+0.1	6
3	(Australia) Ken Kavanagh	Moto Guzzi	27	+13.1	4
4	(Italy) Enrico Lorenzetti	Moto Guzzi			3
5	(West Germany) August Hobl	DKW			2
6	(Italy) Roberto Colombo	Moto Guzzi			1
7	(West Germany) Helmut Hallmeier	NSU			
8	(West Germany) Siegfried Wünsche	DKW			
9	(United Kingdom) Arthur Wheeler	AJS			
10	(Italy) Lodovico Facchinelli	AJS			
11	(United Kingdom) Bill Hall	Norton			
12	(West Germany) Erwin Aldinger	Horex			
13	(Sweden) Sven Andersson	Norton			
14	(Switzerland) Arthur Wick	AJS			

== 250 cc classification ==
Pos	Rider	Manufacturer	Laps	Time	Points
1	(Italy) Carlo Ubbiali	MV Agusta	22	46:34.1	8
2	(West Germany) Hans Baltisberger	NSU	22	+0.3	6
3	(United Kingdom) Sammy Miller	NSU	22	+15.6	4
4	(West Germany) Hermann Paul Müller	NSU			3
5	(United Kingdom) Bill Lomas	MV Agusta			2
6	(Italy) Umberto Masetti	MV Agusta			1
7	(Italy) Roberto Colombo	Moto Guzzi			
8	(West Germany) Kurt Knopf	NSU			
9	(West Germany) Karl Lottes	DKW			
10	(United Kingdom) Arthur Wheeler	Moto Guzzi			
11	(West Germany) Günter Beer	Adler			
12	(Italy) Adelmo Mandolini	Moto Guzzi			
13	(Italy) Lanfranco Baviera	Moto Guzzi			
14	(Spain) Alfredo Flores	Moto Guzzi			
15	(Italy) Dino Fagiolini	Moto Guzzi			
16	(France) René Guérin	Moto Guzzi			
17	(Italy) Guido Sala	Moto Guzzi			

== 125cc classification ==
Pos	Rider	Manufacturer	Laps	Time/Retired	Points
1	(Italy) Carlo Ubbiali	MV Agusta	18	41:03.8	8
2	(Italy) Remo Venturi	MV Agusta	18	+27.1	6
3	(Italy) Angelo Copeta	MV Agusta	18	+1:42.2	4
4	(West Germany) August Hobl	DKW	18	+1:44.5	3
5	(West Germany) Siegfried Wünsche	DKW	17	+1 lap	2
6	(Italy) Paolo Campanelli	Mondial	17	+1 lap	1
7	(Italy) Guido Sala	MV Agusta			
8	(West Germany) Karl Lottes	MV Agusta			
9	(West Germany) Willi Scheidhauer	MV Agusta			
10	(Switzerland) Florian Camathias	MV Agusta			
24 starters, 15 finishers

== Sidecar classification ==
Pos	Rider	Passenger	Manufacturer	Laps	Time	Points
1	(West Germany) Wilhelm Noll	(West Germany) Fritz Cron	BMW	18	41:21.6	8
2	(West Germany) Walter Schneider	(West Germany) Hans Strauss	BMW	18	+0.2	6
3	(France) Jacques Drion	(West Germany) Inge Stoll	Norton	18	+58.6	4
4	(Switzerland) Florian Camathias	(Switzerland) Maurice Büla	BMW			3
5	(France) Jean Murit	(Morocco) Francis Flahaut	BMW			2
6	(West Germany) Fritz Seeber	(West Germany) Franz Heiss	BMW			1
7	(West Germany) Friedrich Staschel	(East Germany) Edgar Perduss	BMW			
8	(West Germany) Loni Neussner	?	Norton			
9	(Italy) Alfonso Sammarchi	?	Norton			
10	(Switzerland) Fritz Mühlemann	(Switzerland) K. Tuscher	BSA			
11	A. Baldi	?	BSA			

Previous race: 1955 Ulster Grand Prix	FIM Grand Prix World Championship; 1955 season	Next race: 1956 Isle of Man TT
Previous race: 1954 Nations Grand Prix	Nations Grand Prix	Next race: 1956 Nations Grand Prix
