= 1955 Isle of Man TT =

Annual motorcycle racing event

Race details
- Race 3 of 8 races in the 1955 Grand Prix motorcycle racing season
- Date: 4–10 June 1955
- Official name: Isle of Man Tourist Trophy
- Location: Snaefell Mountain Course (Senior and Junior); Clypse Course (Ultra Lightweight, Lightweight, Sidecars, Clubmans Senior and Clubmans Junior)
- Course: Public roads; Mountain Course 60.72 km (37.73 mi); Clypse Course 17.63 km (10.95 mi)

500cc
- Rider
Fastest lap
Rider	(United Kingdom) Geoff Duke	Gilera
Time	22:39.0	
Podium
First	(United Kingdom) Geoff Duke	Gilera
Second	(Republic of Ireland) Reg Armstrong	Gilera
Third	(Australia) Ken Kavanagh	Moto Guzzi

350cc
- Rider
Fastest lap
Rider	(United Kingdom) Bill Lomas	Moto Guzzi
Time	24:03.2	
Podium
First	(United Kingdom) Bill Lomas	Moto Guzzi
Second	(United Kingdom) Bob McIntyre	Norton
Third	(United Kingdom) Cecil Sandford	Moto Guzzi

250cc
- Rider
Fastest lap
Rider	(United Kingdom) Bill Lomas	MV Agusta
Time	8:52.0	
Podium
First	(United Kingdom) Bill Lomas	MV Agusta
Second	(United Kingdom) Cecil Sandford	Moto Guzzi
Third	(West Germany) Hermann Paul Müller	NSU

125cc
- Rider
Fastest lap
Rider	(Italy) Carlo Ubbiali	MV Agusta
Time	9:02.2	
Podium
First	(Italy) Carlo Ubbiali	MV Agusta
Second	(Switzerland) Luigi Taveri	MV Agusta
Third	(Italy) Giuseppe Lattanzi	Mondial

Sidecar (B2A)
- Rider
Fastest lap
Rider	(West Germany) Willhelm Noll	BMW
Time	9:00.0	
Podium
First	(West Germany) Walter Schneider	BMW
Second	(United Kingdom) Bill Boddice	Norton
Third	(United Kingdom) Pip Harris	Matchless

In the 1955 Isle of Man TT the Lightweight 250cc race moved to the 10.75 miles long Clypse Course, also used for the Lightweight 125cc TT race, and the Sidecar TT, and the course was used for these races until 1959. During this period the rest of the TT program remained on the Mountain Circuit.

In the Junior TT, Norton rider Bob McIntyre led for four of the seven laps, but brake overheating and suspension problems forced him to slow, allowing Bill Lomas on a Moto Guzzi to pass, and go on to victory.

== Senior TT (500 cc) classification ==
Pos	Rider	Manufacturer	Laps	Time	Points
1	(United Kingdom) Geoff Duke	Gilera	7	2:41:49.8	8
2	(Republic of Ireland) Reg Armstrong	Gilera	7	+1:59.2	6
3	(Australia) Ken Kavanagh	Moto Guzzi	7	+4:43.0	4
4	(United Kingdom) Jack Brett	Norton	7	+5:49.8	3
5	(United Kingdom) Bob McIntyre	Norton	7	+7:03.4	2
6	(Isle of Man) Derek Ennett	Matchless	7	+9:24.6	1
7	(United Kingdom) Bill Lomas	Moto Guzzi	7	+12:05.0	
8	(United Kingdom) Eric Jones	Norton	7	+12:55.4	
9	(United Kingdom) Derek Powell	Matchless	7	+13:35.4	
10	(United Kingdom) Peter Davey	Norton	7	+14:25.2	
47 finishers

== Junior TT (350 cc) classification ==
Pos	Rider	Manufacturer	Laps	Time	Points
1	(United Kingdom) Bill Lomas	Moto Guzzi	7	2:51:38.2	8
2	(United Kingdom) Bob McIntyre	Norton	7	+1:00.0	6
3	(United Kingdom) Cecil Sandford	Moto Guzzi	7	+1:24.0	4
4	(United Kingdom) John Surtees	Norton	7	+3:14.0	3
5	(Australia) Maurice Quincey	Norton	7	+4:03.8	2
6	(United Kingdom) John Hartle	Norton	7	+5:16.8	1
7	(Isle of Man) Derek Ennett	AJS	7	+7:00.2	
8	(Italy) Duilio Agostini	Moto Guzzi	7	+8:46.6	
9	(New Zealand) Peter Murphy	AJS	7	+8:59.8	
10	(Australia) Jack Ahearn	Norton	7	+10:23.0	
52 finishers

== Lightweight TT (250 cc) classification ==
Pos	Rider	Manufacturer	Laps	Time	Points
1	(United Kingdom) Bill Lomas	MV Agusta	9	1:21:38.2	8
2	(United Kingdom) Cecil Sandford	Moto Guzzi	9	+51.2	6
3	(West Germany) Hermann Paul Müller	NSU	9	+4:43.4	4
4	(United Kingdom) Arthur Wheeler	Moto Guzzi	9	+8:06.2	3
5	(United Kingdom) Dave Chadwick	R.D. Special	9	+9:07.4	2
6	(United Kingdom) Bill Webster	Velocette	9	+13:27.2	1
7	(United Kingdom) Phil Carter	Norton	9	+15:27.6	
8	(United Kingdom) Bill Maddrick	Moto Guzzi	9	+16:16.8	
8 finishers

== Ultra-Lightweight TT (125 cc) classification ==
Pos	Rider	Manufacturer	Laps	Time	Points
1	(Italy) Carlo Ubbiali	MV Agusta	9	1:23:38.2	8
2	(Switzerland) Luigi Taveri	MV Agusta	9	+2.0	6
3	(Italy) Giuseppe Lattanze	Mondial	9	+2:14.8	4
4	(United Kingdom) Bill Lomas	MV Agusta	9	+2:59.6	3
5	(United Kingdom) Bill Webster	MV Agusta	9	+20:35.8	2
6	(United Kingdom) Ross Porter	MV Agusta	9	+22:26.8	1
7	(United Kingdom) Frank Burman	EMC-Puch	9	+22:33.8	
8	(United Kingdom) Len Harfield	LCH	9	+27:11.8	
16 starters, 8 finishers

== Sidecar TT classification ==
Pos	Rider	Passenger	Manufacturer	Laps	Time	Points
1	(West Germany) Walter Schneider	(West Germany) Hans Strauss	BMW	9	1:23:14.0	8
2	(United Kingdom) Bill Boddice	(United Kingdom) William Storr	Norton	9	+3:44.6	6
3	(United Kingdom) Pip Harris	(United Kingdom) Ray Campbell	Matchless	9	+5:08.0	4
4	(United Kingdom) Jackie Beeton	(United Kingdom) Charles Billingham	Norton	9	+5:40.0	3
5	(United Kingdom) Frank Taylor	(United Kingdom) Ron Taylor	Norton	9	+8:38.8	2
6	(United Kingdom) Ernie Walker	(United Kingdom) Dun Roberts	Norton	9	+8:42.4	1
7	(United Kingdom) Fred Hanks	(United Kingdom) E. Donnan	Matchless	9	+10:22.4	
8	(United Kingdom) Derek Yorke	(United Kingdom) R. Eden	Norton	9	+14:48.0	
9	(United Kingdom) A. H. Skein	(United Kingdom) F. Westaway	Norton	9	+18:27.0	
10	(Switzerland) Fritz Mühlemann	(Switzerland) K. Tuscher	BSA	9	+26:54.0	
10 finishers

== Non-championship races ==
=== Clubmans Senior TT classification ===
Pos	Rider	Manufacturer	Laps	Time
1	Eddie Dow	BSA	9	1:22:23
2	I. M. Atkinson	Triumph	9	+1:08
3	R. Kelly	Triumph	9	+2:01
4	P. Ferbrache	BSA	9	+2:39
5	D. Andrews	BSA	9	+2:58
6	A. H. Mustard	BSA	9	+3:01
7	F. Wallis	BSA	9	
8	G. W. Shekell	Triumph	9	
9	M. W. Gillingham	Triumph	9	
10	D. J. Hunt	BSA	9	
12 finishers

=== Clubmans Junior TT classification ===
Pos	Rider	Manufacturer	Laps	Time
1	Jimmy Buchan	BSA	9	1:25:24.0
2	D. Joubert	BSA	9	+15.6
3	P. Ferbrache	BSA	9	+2:30.8
4	R. Thompson	BSA	9	+4:49.0
5	C. McLean	BSA	9	+4:50.4
6	W. H. Hocking	BSA	9	+4:57.8
7	K. W. James	BSA	9	
8	D. Jervis	BSA	9	
9	T. E. Hutchinson	BSA	9	
10	R. M. Harding	BSA	9	
12 finishers

Previous race: 1955 French Grand Prix	FIM Grand Prix World Championship; 1955 season	Next race: 1955 German Grand Prix
Previous race: 1954 Isle of Man TT	Isle of Man TT	Next race: 1956 Isle of Man TT
