= 1955 Dutch TT =

(Netherlands) 1955 Dutch TT
Race details
- Race 6 of 8 races in the 1955 Grand Prix motorcycle racing season
- Date: 16 July 1955
- Location: Circuit van Drenthe, Assen
- Course: Public roads; 7.700 km (4.785 mi)

500cc
- Rider
Fastest lap
Rider	(United Kingdom) Geoff Duke (Republic of Ireland) Reg Armstrong	Gilera; Gilera
Time	3:31.6	
Podium
First	(United Kingdom) Geoff Duke	Gilera
Second	(Republic of Ireland) Reg Armstrong	Gilera
Third	(Italy) Umberto Masetti	MV Agusta

350cc
- Rider
Fastest lap
Rider	(United Kingdom) Dickie Dale	Moto Guzzi
Time	3:34.5	
Podium
First	(Australia) Ken Kavanagh	Moto Guzzi
Second	(United Kingdom) Bill Lomas	Moto Guzzi
Third	(United Kingdom) Dickie Dale	Moto Guzzi

250cc
- Rider
Fastest lap
Rider	(United Kingdom) Bill Lomas	MV Agusta
Time	3:42.4	
Podium
First	(Switzerland) Luigi Taveri	MV Agusta
Second	(Italy) Umberto Masetti	MV Agusta
Third	(West Germany) Hermann Paul Müller	NSU

125cc
- Rider
Fastest lap
Rider	(Switzerland) Luigi Taveri	MV Agusta
Time	3:53.4	
Podium
First	(Italy) Carlo Ubbiali	MV Agusta
Second	(Italy) Remo Venturi	MV Agusta
Third	(Austria) Rudolf Grimas	Mondial

Sidecar (B2A)
- Rider
Fastest lap
Rider	(United Kingdom) Cyril Smith	Norton
Time	3:51.9	
Podium
First	(West Germany) Willi Faust	BMW
Second	(West Germany) Wilhelm Noll	BMW
Third	(Australia) Bob Mitchell	Norton

The 1955 Dutch TT was the sixth round of the 1955 Grand Prix motorcycle racing season. It took place on 16 July 1955 at the Circuit van Drenthe, Assen.

A new 4.7 mile (7.7 km) circuit had been built at Assen for the Dutch TT; the public road version was no longer used after 1954. This track set the foundation for future Dutch TT's.

== 500 cc classification ==
Pos	Rider	Manufacturer	Laps	Time	Points
1	(United Kingdom) Geoff Duke	Gilera	27	1:37:03.9	8
2	(Republic of Ireland) Reg Armstrong	Gilera	27	+35.3	6
3	(Italy) Umberto Masetti	MV Agusta	27	+2:05.3	4
4	(Netherlands) Drikus Veer	Gilera			3
5	(Australia) Bob Brown	Matchless			2
6	(South Africa) Eddie Grant	Norton			1
7	(Netherlands) Piet Bakker	Norton			
8	(West Germany) Hans-Günter Jäger	Norton			
9	(Netherlands) Priem Rozenberg	BMW			
10	(United Kingdom) Phil Heath	Norton			
11	(United Kingdom) Robin Fitton	Norton			
12	(Netherlands) Piet Knijenburg	Matchless			
13	(Netherlands) Casper Swart	Norton			
14	(Italy) Alfredo Milani	Gilera			
15	(Netherlands) Gerrit ten Kate	Norton			

== 350 cc classification ==
Pos	Rider	Manufacturer	Laps	Time	Points
1	(Australia) Ken Kavanagh	Moto Guzzi	20	1:13:36.2	8
2	(United Kingdom) Bill Lomas	Moto Guzzi	20	+0.2	6
3	(United Kingdom) Dickie Dale	Moto Guzzi	20	+0.5	4
4	(West Germany) August Hobl	DKW			3
5	(West Germany) Karl Hofmann	DKW			2
6	(West Germany) Hans Bartl	DKW			1
7	(West Germany) Hans Baltisberger	NSU			
8	(West Germany) Siegfried Wünsche	DKW			
9	(Netherlands) Lo Simons	AJS			
10	(West Germany) Heinz Kauert	AJS			

== 250 cc classification ==
Pos	Rider	Manufacturer	Laps	Time	Points
1	(Switzerland) Luigi Taveri	MV Agusta	17	1:04:22.4	8
2	(Italy) Umberto Masetti	MV Agusta	17	+41.2	6
3	(West Germany) Hermann Paul Müller	NSU	17	+43.8	4
4	(Italy) Enrico Lorenzetti	Moto Guzzi			3
5	(United Kingdom) Cecil Sandford	Moto Guzzi			2
6	(United Kingdom) Arthur Wheeler	Moto Guzzi			1
7	(West Germany) Günter Beer	Adler			
8	(Australia) Jack Forrest	NSU			
9	(West Germany) Kurt Knopf	NSU			
10	(Netherlands) Piet Knijenburg	NSU			
11	(West Germany) Karl-Julius Holthaus	NSU			
12	(Netherlands) Lo Simons	NSU			
13	(West Germany) Ludwig Malchus	NSU			

== 125cc classification ==
Pos	Rider	Manufacturer	Laps	Time/Retired	Points
1	(Italy) Carlo Ubbiali	MV Agusta	14	57:17.2	8
2	(Italy) Remo Venturi	MV Agusta	14	+0.2	6
3	(Austria) Rudolf Grimas	Mondial	13	+1 lap	4
4	(United Kingdom) Bill Webster	MV Agusta	13	+1 lap	3
5	(West Germany) Willi Scheidhauer	MV Agusta	13	+1 lap	2
6	(West Germany) Erich Wünsche	MV Agusta	13	+1 lap	1
7	(Netherlands) Gerrit Dupont	MV Agusta			
8	(Netherlands) Jasper Kaspers	Sparta			
9	(United Kingdom) Bill Maddrick	MV Agusta			
10	(Netherlands) Jan Muijlwijk	DKW			
11	(Netherlands) Jan Rietveld	Eysink			
15 starters, 11 finishers

== Sidecar classification ==
Pos	Rider	Passenger	Manufacturer	Laps	Time	Points
1	(West Germany) Willi Faust	(West Germany) Karl Remmert	BMW	14	55:41.1	8
2	(West Germany) Wilhelm Noll	(West Germany) Fritz Cron	BMW	14	+18.2	6
3	(Australia) Bob Mitchell	(Australia) Max George	Norton	14	+1:31.0	4
4	(France) Jean Murit	(Morocco) Francis Flahaut	BMW			3
5	(France) Jacques Drion	(West Germany) Inge Stoll	Norton			2
6	(Netherlands) Henk Steman	(Netherlands) Mappie de Haas	BMW			1
7	(Switzerland) Roland Benz	(Switzerland) Jakob Kuchler	Norton			
8	(West Germany) Loni Neussner	?	Norton			
9	(Switzerland) Hans Haldemann	(Switzerland) Herbert Läderach	Norton			

Previous race: 1955 Belgian Grand Prix	FIM Grand Prix World Championship; 1955 season	Next race: 1955 Ulster Grand Prix
Previous race: 1954 Dutch TT	Dutch TT	Next race: 1956 Dutch TT
