= The Nook, Isle of Man =

Location on road race course

Coordinates: 54°10′28″N 4°28′07″W

The Nook (Middle English: a corner or recess) is situated on the primary A18 Mountain Road in the parish of Onchan in the Isle of Man between the 37th Milestone road-side marker on the Snaefell Mountain Course and the TT Grandstand on the primary A2 Glencrutchery Road in the town of Douglas.

The Nook along with the nearby Governor's Bridge road junction and hairpin bends is part of the Snaefell Mountain Course used since 1920 for the Isle of Man TT and from 1923 for the Manx Grand Prix Races. The Nook was part of the Clypse Course for the Isle of Man TT races between 1954 and 1959. It is also part of the Willaston Circuit used for cycle racing, classic car racing and used as part of timed special stage for the Rally Isle of Man.

For the 1954 Isle of Man TT races, the approach to Governor's Bridge including The Nook corner on the A18 Bemahauge Road was widened to accommodate the re-introduced Sidecar TT on the Clypse Course. The Department of Transport announced a proposal to build a new section of road for the Mountain Course with a link road from The Nook to Governor's Bridge using parts of the pre-existing A18 Bemahague Road. This road widening scheme occurred between February and April 2008 with the removal of trees on the Bemahague Estate which includes Government House, the official residence of the Lieutenant Governor of the Isle of Man. The Isle of Man TT Races and Manx Grand Prix continued to use the original A18 Bemahauge Road that runs parallel to the new link road from The Nook to the Governor's Dip for motor-cycle racing.
