= 1956 Belgian motorcycle Grand Prix =

(Belgium) 1956 Belgian Grand Prix
Race details
- Race 3 of 6 races in the 1956 Grand Prix motorcycle racing season
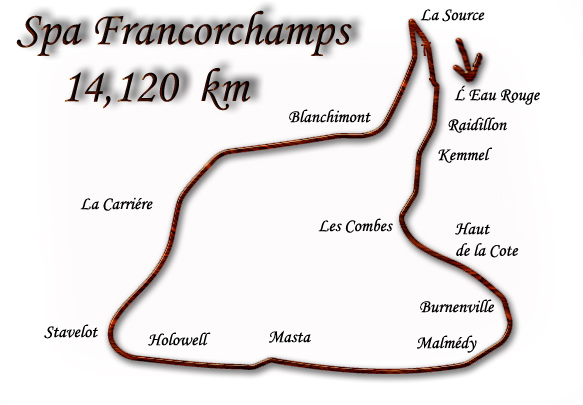
- Date: 8 July 1956
- Location: Circuit de Spa-Francorchamps
- Course: Permanent racing facility; 14.100 km (8.761 mi)

500cc
- Rider
Fastest lap
Rider	(United Kingdom) Geoff Duke	Gilera
Time	4:29.0	
Podium
First	(United Kingdom) John Surtees	MV Agusta
Second	(West Germany) Walter Zeller	BMW
Third	(France) Pierre Monneret	Gilera

350cc
- Rider
Fastest lap
Rider	(United Kingdom) Bill Lomas	Moto Guzzi
Time	4:41.5	
Podium
First	(United Kingdom) John Surtees	MV Agusta
Second	(West Germany) August Hobl	DKW
Third	(United Kingdom) Cecil Sandford	DKW

250cc
- Rider
Fastest lap
Rider	(Italy) Enrico Lorenzetti	Moto Guzzi
Time	4:54.5	
Podium
First	(Italy) Carlo Ubbiali	MV Agusta
Second	(Switzerland) Luigi Taveri	MV Agusta
Third	(West Germany) Horst Kassner	NSU Motorenwerke

125cc
- Rider
Fastest lap
Rider	(Italy) Romolo Ferri	Gilera
Time	5:13.2	
Podium
First	(Italy) Carlo Ubbiali	MV Agusta
Second	(Italy) Fortunato Libanori	MV Agusta
Third	(France) Pierre Monneret	Gilera

Sidecar (B2A)
- Rider
Fastest lap
Rider	(United Kingdom) Cyril Smith	Norton
Time	5:18.1	
Podium
First	(West Germany) Wilhelm Noll	BMW
Second	(United Kingdom) Pip Harris	Norton
Third	(Australia) Bob Mitchell	Norton

The 1956 Belgian motorcycle Grand Prix was the third round of the 1956 Grand Prix motorcycle racing season. It took place on 8 July 1956 at the Circuit de Spa-Francorchamps.

== 500 cc classification ==
Pos	Rider	Manufacturer	Laps	Time	Points
1	(United Kingdom) John Surtees	MV Agusta	15	1:09:02.2	8
2	(West Germany) Walter Zeller	BMW	15	+39.0	6
3	(France) Pierre Monneret	Gilera	15	+1:28.5	4
4	(Italy) Umberto Masetti	MV Agusta	15		3
5	(Italy) Alfredo Milani	Gilera	15		2
6	(Belgium) Auguste Goffin	Norton	15		1
7	(Australia) Barry Hodgkinson	Norton	15		
8	(United Kingdom) John Storr	Norton	15		
9	(United Kingdom) Bob Matthews	Norton	14	+1 lap	
10	(Australia) Keith Bryen	Norton	14	+1 lap	
11	(South Africa) Eddie Grant	Norton	14	+1 lap	
12	(Gibraltar) John Grace	Norton	14	+1 lap	
13	(New Zealand) Fred Cook	Matchless	14	+1 lap	
14	M. Roche	Norton	14	+1 lap	
15	P. Nicholas	Norton	14	+1 lap	

== 350 cc classification ==
Pos	Rider	Manufacturer	Laps	Time	Points
1	(United Kingdom) John Surtees	MV Agusta	11	52:48.6	8
2	(West Germany) August Hobl	DKW	11	+16.8	6
3	(United Kingdom) Cecil Sandford	DKW	11	+48.1	4
4	(West Germany) Karl Hofmann	DKW	11		3
5	(Italy) Umberto Masetti	MV Agusta	11		2
6	(West Germany) Hans Bartl	DKW	11		1
7	(Belgium) Auguste Goffin	Norton	11		
8	(United Kingdom) Bob Matthews	Norton	11		
9	(Australia) Barry Hodgkinson	Norton	11		
10	(United Kingdom) John Storr	Norton	11		
11	(United Kingdom) Arthur Wheeler	Moto Guzzi	11		
12	(South Africa) Eddie Grant	Norton	11		
13	(Australia) Keith Bryen	Norton	10	+1 lap	
14	J. J. Wood	Velocette	10	+1 lap	
15	M. Roche	Norton	10	+1 lap	
16	(New Zealand) Fred Cook	AJS	10	+1 lap	
17	(Australia) Bob Brown	AJS	10	+1 lap	
18	(Belgium) Pierre Vervroegen	Norton	10	+1 lap	
19	(Belgium) Firmin Dauwe	Norton	10	+1 lap	
20	(France) Jean-Pierre Bayle	Norton	10	+1 lap	
21	(Netherlands) Lo Simons	AJS	10	+1 lap	
22	(Netherlands) Leen Rehorst	AJS	10	+1 lap	
23	(Belgium) Christian Baix	Norton	10	+1 lap	

== 250 cc classification ==
Pos	Rider	Manufacturer	Laps	Time	Points
1	(Italy) Carlo Ubbiali	MV Agusta	9	45:11.9	8
2	(Switzerland) Luigi Taveri	MV Agusta	9	+38.1	6
3	(West Germany) Horst Kassner	NSU	9	+1:41.2	4
4	(Netherlands) Kees Koster	NSU	9		3
5	(Netherlands) Lo Simons	NSU	9		2
6	(France) Jean-Pierre Bayle	NSU	8	+1 lap	1
7	(West Germany) Karl-Julius Holthaus	NSU	8	+1 lap	
8	(Italy) Tarquinio Provini	Mondial	8	+1 lap	
9	(West Germany) Siegfried Lohmann	Adler	8	+1 lap	
10	(United Kingdom) Bill Maddrick	Moto Guzzi	8	+1 lap	

== 125cc classification ==
Pos	Rider	Manufacturer	Laps	Time/Retired	Points
1	(Italy) Carlo Ubbiali	MV Agusta	8	42:09.1	8
2	(Italy) Fortunato Libanori	MV Agusta	8	+39.6	6
3	(France) Pierre Monneret	Gilera	8	+51.9	4
4	(Switzerland) Luigi Taveri	MV Agusta	8	+2:04.5	3
5	(West Germany) Karl Hofmann	DKW	8	+2:52.3	2
6	(Gibraltar) John Grace	Montesa	7	+1 lap	1
7	(Spain) Francisco González	Montesa	7	+1 lap	
8	(Netherlands) Lo Simons	Mondial	7	+1 lap	
9	(United Kingdom) Bill Maddrick	MV Agusta	6	+2 laps	
17 starters, 9 finishers

== Sidecar classification ==
Pos	Rider	Passenger	Manufacturer	Laps	Time	Points
1	(West Germany) Wilhelm Noll	(West Germany) Fritz Cron	BMW	8	43:17.5	8
2	(United Kingdom) Pip Harris	(United Kingdom) Ray Campbell	Norton	8	+35.5	6
3	(Australia) Bob Mitchell	(United Kingdom) Eric Bliss	Norton	8	+40.2	4
4	(West Germany) Fritz Hillebrand	(West Germany) Manfred Grunwald	BMW	8		3
5	(West Germany) Helmut Fath	(West Germany) Emil Ohr	BMW	8		2
6	(France) Jacques Drion	(Switzerland) Inge Stoll	BMW	8		1
7	(Belgium) Jack Wijns	(Belgium) Jean Verwoot	BMW	8		
8	(West Germany) Walter Schneider	(West Germany) Hans Strauss	BMW	8		
9	(France) Marcel Beauvais	(France) André Coudert	Norton	8		
10	B. R. Vervroegen	?	Norton	8		
11	R. Ransens	?	Norton	7	+1 lap	

Previous race: 1956 Dutch TT	FIM Grand Prix World Championship; 1956 season	Next race: 1956 German Grand Prix
Previous race: 1955 Belgian Grand Prix	Belgian Grand Prix	Next race: 1957 Belgian Grand Prix
