= 1956 Dutch TT =

(Netherlands) 1956 Dutch TT
Race details
- Race 2 of 6 races in the 1956 Grand Prix motorcycle racing season
- Date: 30 June 1956
- Location: Circuit van Drenthe, Assen
- Course: Public roads; 7.700 km (4.785 mi)

500cc
- Rider
Fastest lap
Rider	(United Kingdom) John Surtees	MV Agusta
Time	3:25.2	
Podium
First	(United Kingdom) John Surtees	MV Agusta
Second	(Germany) Walter Zeller	BMW
Third	(South Africa) Eddie Grant	Norton

350cc
- Rider
Fastest lap
Rider	(United Kingdom) Bill Lomas	Moto Guzzi
Time	3:30.5	
Podium
First	(United Kingdom) Bill Lomas	Moto Guzzi
Second	(United Kingdom) Gary Hocking	MV Agusta
Third	(Germany) August Hobl	DKW

250cc
- Rider
Fastest lap
Rider	(Italy) Carlo Ubbiali	MV Agusta
Time	3:34.4	
Podium
First	(Italy) Carlo Ubbiali	MV Agusta
Second	(Switzerland) Luigi Taveri	MV Agusta
Third	(Italy) Enrico Lorenzetti	Moto Guzzi

125cc
- Rider
Fastest lap
Rider	(Italy) Carlo Ubbiali	MV Agusta
Time	3:45.6	
Podium
First	(Italy) Carlo Ubbiali	MV Agusta
Second	(Switzerland) Luigi Taveri	MV Agusta
Third	(Germany) August Hobl	DKW

Sidecar (B2A)
- Rider
Fastest lap
Rider	(United Kingdom) Pip Harris	Norton
Time	3:50.1	
Podium
First	(Germany) Fritz Hillebrand	BMW
Second	(West Germany) Wilhelm Noll	BMW
Third	(United Kingdom) Cyril Smith	Norton

The 1956 Dutch TT was the second race of the 1956 Motorcycle Grand Prix season. It took place on the weekend of 30 June 1956 at the Assen circuit.

== 500 cc classification ==
Pos	Rider	Manufacturer	Laps	Time	Points
1	(United Kingdom) John Surtees	MV Agusta	27	1:34:05.1	8
2	(West Germany) Walter Zeller	BMW	27	+25.5	6
3	(South Africa) Eddie Grant	Norton	26	+1 lap	4
4	(Australia) Keith Bryen	Norton	26	+1 lap	3
5	(New Zealand) Paul Fahey	Matchless	26	+1 lap	2
6	(West Germany) Ernst Hiller	BMW	26	+1 lap	1
7	(Canada) Gerald Robarts	Norton	26	+1 lap	
8	(Netherlands) Piet Bakker	Norton	26	+1 lap	
9	(Netherlands) Priem Rozenberg	BMW	26	+1 lap	
10	(New Zealand) Fred Cook	Matchless	25	+2 laps	
11	(Netherlands) Casper Swart	Norton	24	+3 laps	

== 350 cc classification ==
Pos	Rider	Manufacturer	Laps	Time	Points
1	(United Kingdom) Bill Lomas	Moto Guzzi	20	1:11:21.8	8
2	(United Kingdom) John Surtees	MV Agusta	20	+13.6	6
3	(West Germany) August Hobl	DKW	20	+18.5	4
4	(United Kingdom) Cecil Sandford	DKW	20		3
5	(Australia) Ken Kavanagh	Moto Guzzi	20		2
6	(United Kingdom) Dickie Dale	Moto Guzzi	20		1
7	(Italy) Duilio Agostini	Moto Guzzi	20		
8	(West Germany) Karl Hofmann	DKW	20		
9	(South Africa) Eddie Grant	Norton	20		
10	(New Zealand) Paul Fahey	AJS	20		
11	(Australia) Barry Hodgkinson	Norton	19	+1 lap	
12	(Czechoslovakia) Gustav Havel	Jawa	19	+1 lap	
13	(Canada) Gerald Robarts	AJS	19	+1 lap	
14	(Australia) Keith Bryen	Norton	19	+1 lap	
15	H. Wieland	Norton	19	+1 lap	
16	(United Kingdom) Ken Tostevin	Norton	19	+1 lap	
17	(Italy) Adelmo Mandolini	Moto Guzzi	19	+1 lap	
18	(Netherlands) Leen Rehorst	AJS	18	+2 laps	
19	(Netherlands) Lo Simons	Norton	18	+2 laps	

== 250 cc classification ==
Pos	Rider	Manufacturer	Laps	Time	Points
1	(Italy) Carlo Ubbiali	MV Agusta	17	1:02:26.5	8
2	(Switzerland) Luigi Taveri	MV Agusta	17	+22.6	6
3	(Italy) Enrico Lorenzetti	Moto Guzzi	17	+1:59.0	4
4	(Italy) Roberto Colombo	MV Agusta	17		3
5	(West Germany) Horst Kassner	NSU	16	+1 lap	2
6	(Czechoslovakia) Jiří Koštíř	ČZ	16	+1 lap	1
7	(Netherlands) Lo Simons	NSU	16	+1 lap	
8	(Netherlands) Kees Koster	NSU	16	+1 lap	
9	(West Germany) Hubert Attenberger	Adler	16	+1 lap	
10	(West Germany) Karl-Julius Holthaus	NSU	16	+1 lap	
11	(Switzerland) Florian Camathias	NSU	16	+1 lap	
12	B. Giannini	Moto Guzzi	16	+1 lap	
13	(Netherlands) Jasper Kaspers	ČZ	15	+2 laps	

== 125cc classification ==
Pos	Rider	Manufacturer	Laps	Time/Retired	Points
1	(Italy) Carlo Ubbiali	MV Agusta	14	53:40.2	8
2	(Switzerland) Luigi Taveri	MV Agusta	14	+16.1	6
3	(West Germany) August Hobl	DKW	14	+54.5	4
4	(United Kingdom) Cecil Sandford	Mondial	14	+1:10.2	3
5	(West Germany) Karl Hofmann	DKW	14	+2:14.1	2
6	(Czechoslovakia) František Bartoš	ČZ	14	+3:06.0	1
7	(Spain) Francisco González	Montesa	14		
8	(Gibraltar) John Grace	Montesa	14		
9	(Spain) Marcelo Cama	Montesa	13	+1 lap	
10	(United Kingdom) Bill Webster	MV Agusta	13	+1 lap	
11	(Netherlands) Lo Simons	Mondial	13	+1 lap	
12	(Switzerland) Florian Camathias	MV Agusta	12	+2 laps	
13	(Czechoslovakia) Václav Parus	ČZ	12	+2 laps	
14	(Netherlands) Jasper Kaspers	Sparta	12	+2 laps	
15	(Netherlands) Gerrit Dupont	NSU	11	+3 laps	
22 starters, 15 finishers

== Sidecar classification ==
Pos	Rider	Passenger	Manufacturer	Laps	Time	Points
1	(West Germany) Fritz Hillebrand	(West Germany) Manfred Grunwald	BMW	14	54:46.5	8
2	(West Germany) Wilhelm Noll	(West Germany) Fritz Cron	BMW	14	+6.4	6
3	(United Kingdom) Cyril Smith	(United Kingdom) Stanley Dibben	Norton	14	+27.9	4
4	(Australia) Bob Mitchell	(United Kingdom) Eric Bliss	Norton	14		3
5	(Switzerland) Florian Camathias	(Switzerland) Maurice Büla	BMW	14		2
6	(France) Jacques Drion	(Switzerland) Inge Stoll	BMW	14		1
7	(West Germany) Helmut Fath	(West Germany) Emil Ohr	BMW	14		
8	(West Germany) Loni Neussner	(West Germany) Dieter Hess	BMW	14		
9	(West Germany) Fritz Seeber	(West Germany) Franz Heiß	BMW	13	+1 lap	
10	(Australia) Arthur Lang	(Australia) Donald Maxwell	Norton	13	+1 lap	
11	(Netherlands) Harmen van der Wal	?	Norton	12	+2 laps	

Previous race: 1956 Isle of Man TT	FIM Grand Prix World Championship; 1956 season	Next race: 1956 Belgian Grand Prix
Previous race: 1955 Dutch TT	Dutch TT	Next race: 1957 Dutch TT
