= Governor's Bridge (Isle of Man) =

Coordinates: 54°10′18″N 4°28′06″W

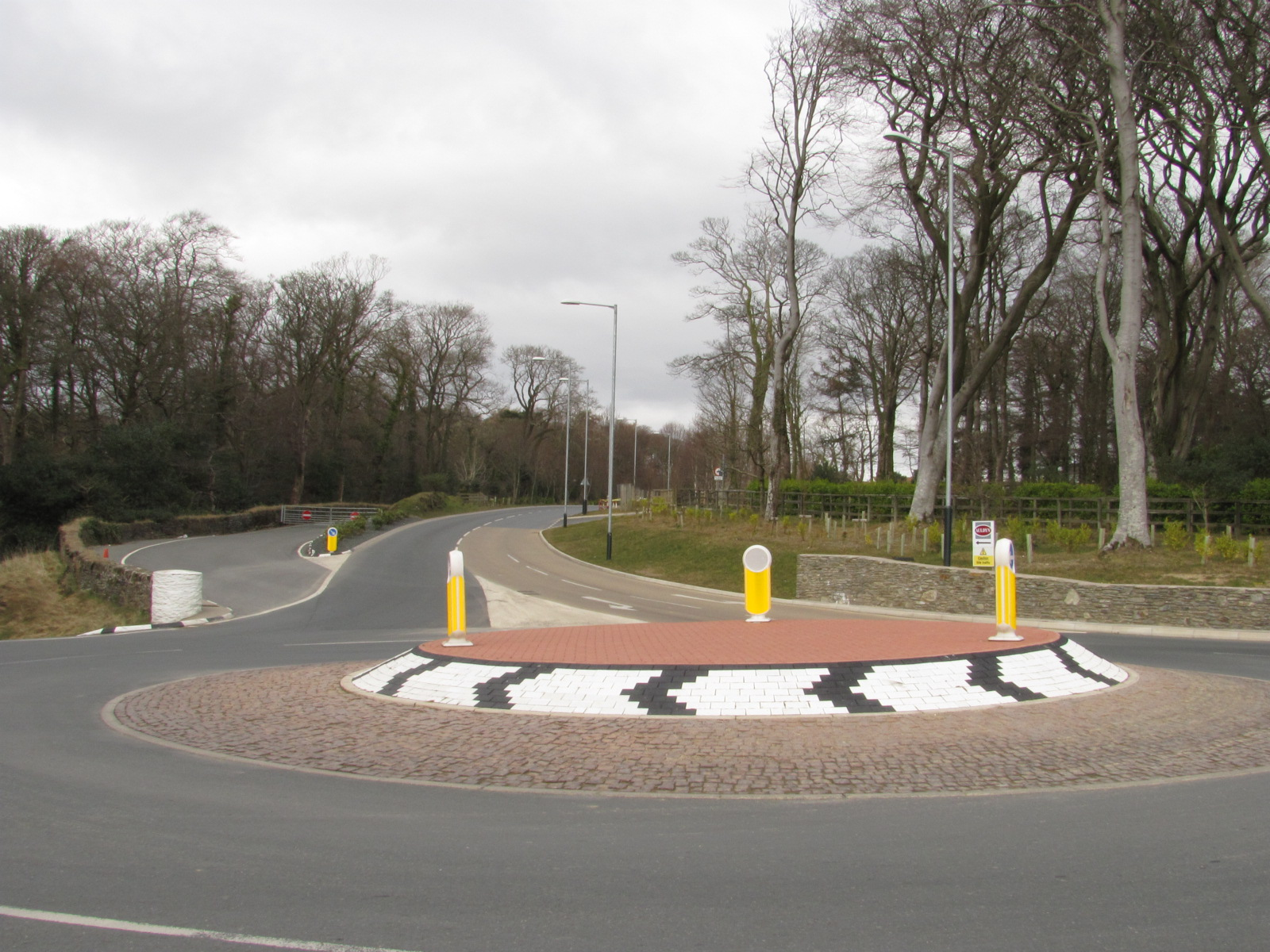
Governor's Bridge newly improved road junction at the A18 Bemahague Road (running uphill into the distance) and the A2 Governor's Road (running left to right) showing the historic section Old Bemahague Road still used as part of TT course gated-off to the left, with the hairpin-bend into the dip just out-of-frame

Governor's Bridge (formerly known as Heywood's Bridge or the Deemster's Bridge) is a hairpin bend adjacent to a road junction on the primary A18 Mountain Road in the parish of Onchan in the Isle of Man, with a sudden drop in elevation leading to Governor's Dip, followed by a left-hand bend and finally a right exiting on to the main Glencrutchery Road.

The Governor's Bridge road junction and hairpin bend are part of the Snaefell Mountain Course used since 1920 for the Isle of Man TT and from 1923 for the Manx Grand Prix Races. This junction was part of the Clypse Course for the TT races between 1954 and 1959. It is also part of the Willaston Circuit used for cycle racing, classic car racing and used as part of a timed special stage for the Rally Isle of Man.

For the 1920 Isle of Man TT Races, changes were made to the Mountain Course and competitors then turned left at Hillberry, continuing uphill at Cronk-ny-Mona following the primary A18 Mountain Road to Governor's Bridge, with a new start/finish line on Glencrutchery Road which lengthened the course to 37.75 miles (60.75 km).

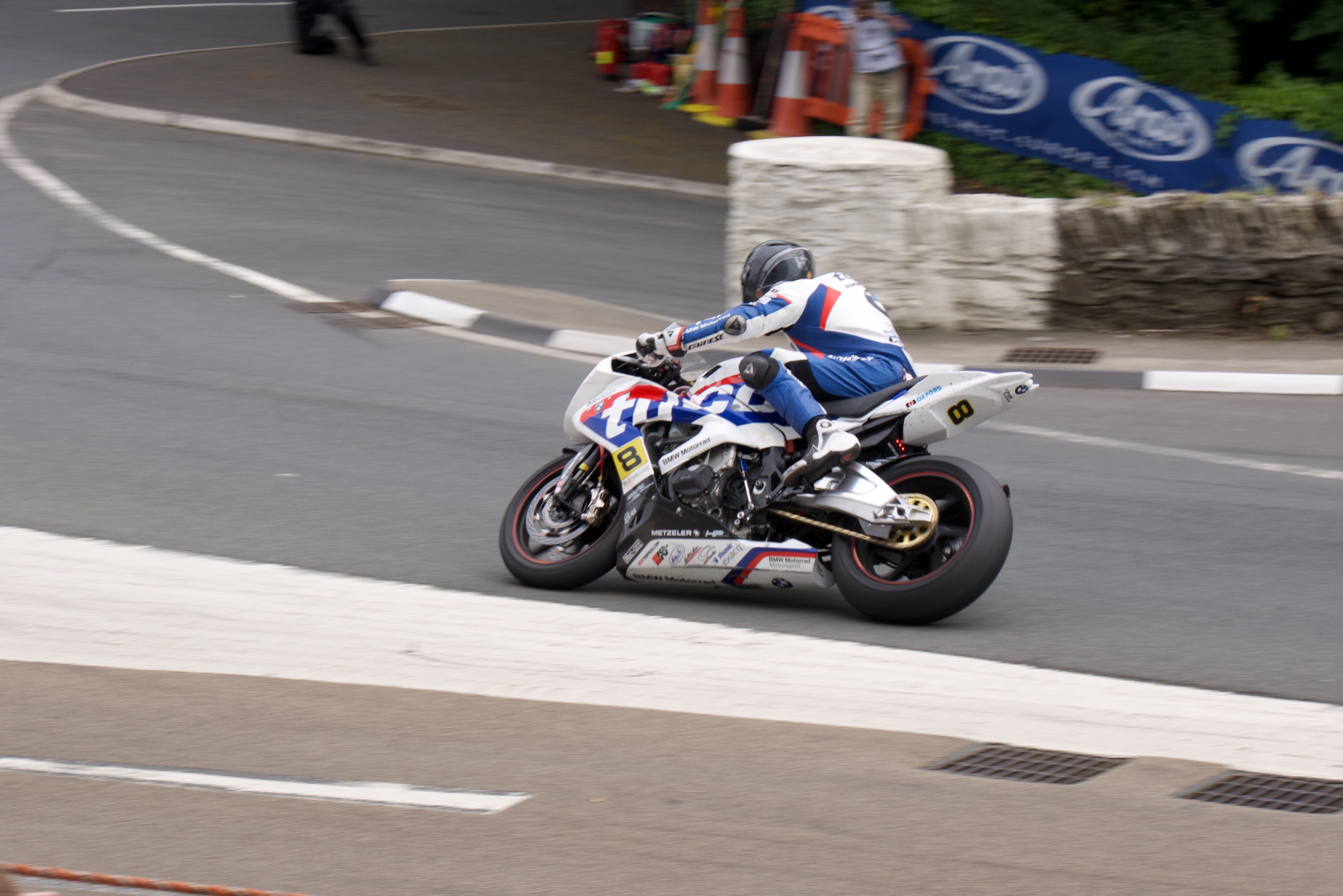
Guy Martin on a racing line in 2015 leaving Old Bemahague Road about to enter Governor's Bridge/Governor's Dip in the 2015 Senior TT race

This included the creation of a new link road at Governor's Bridge on the primary A2 Ramsey to Douglas Road between the road junction of the newly created A18 Bemahague road (from Governor's Bridge to Signpost Corner), the A2 Governor's Road/Glencrutchery Road and Victoria Road in Douglas. The new A2 link road effectively redirected the main road traffic and created the Governor's Dip bends off the primary A2 road which was used as part of the Snaefell Mountain Course for motor-cycle racing. The new link road also created a small wooded glen on the site which is known for its distinctive horse-chestnut trees.

For the 1954 Isle of Man TT races, the approach to Governor's Bridge on the A18 Bemahague Road was widened with the removal of a grass bank to facilitate turning of the wider sidecar outfits in the re-introduced Sidecar TT on the Clypse Course.

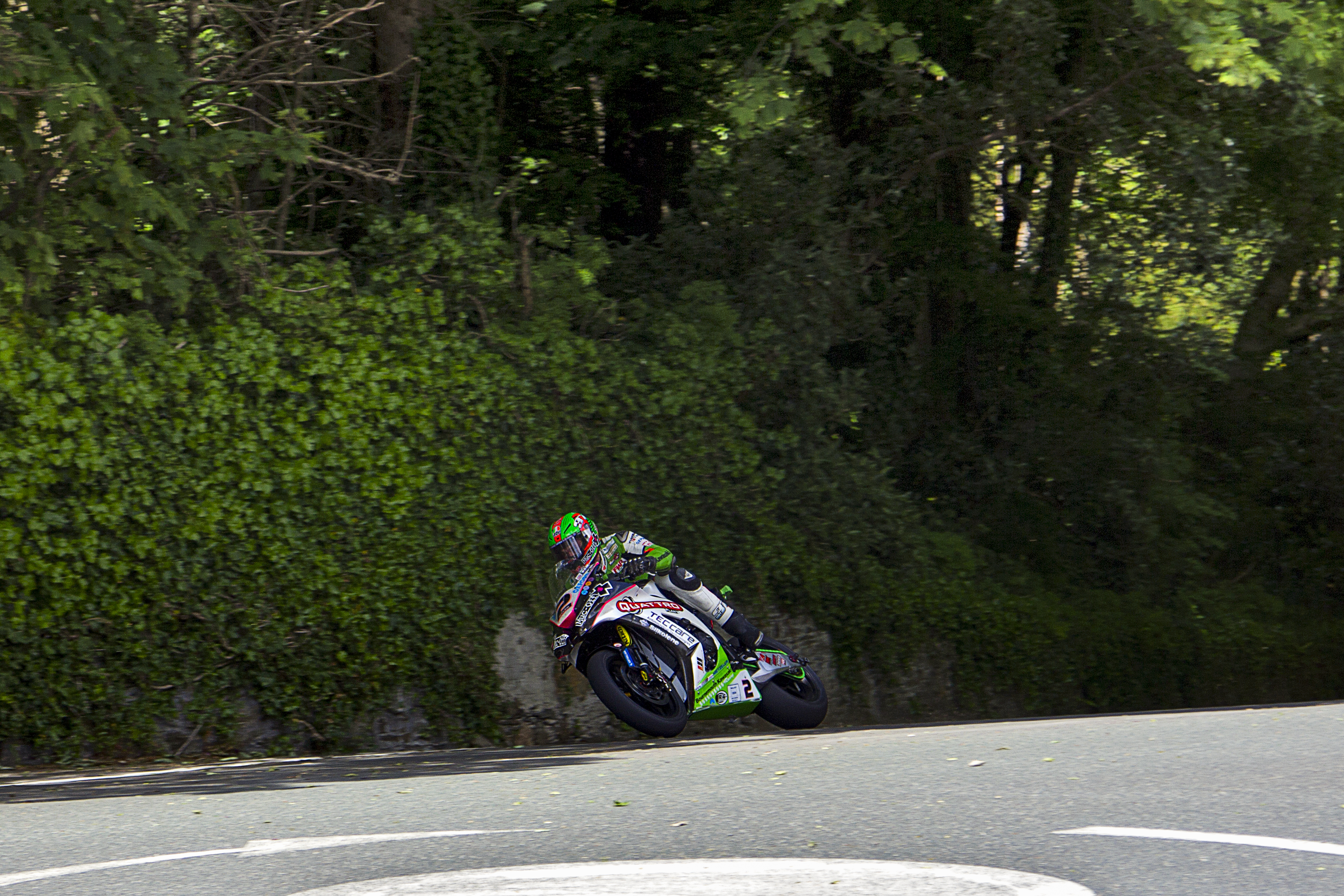
James Hillier exiting Governor's Dip from adjacent Governor's Bridge during the 2015 Superbike race, a dark area with a heavy tree-canopy traditionally requiring careful riding to avoid a low-speed spill due to damp road conditions on a part of the original TT course usually closed to 'everyday' traffic

During October 2007 the Isle of Man Department of Transport began road widening at Braddan Bridge, further around the Mountain Course exiting Douglas, additionally creating a roundabout. The Department of Transport also announced a proposal to build a new section of road for the Mountain Course with a link road from Signpost Corner to Governor's Bridge using the pre-existing A18 Bemahague Road. This road widening scheme occurred between February and April 2008, with the removal of trees on the Bemahague Estate (which includes Government House, the official residence of the Lieutenant Governor of the Isle of Man) and the creation of a small mini-roundabout. Further work by the Isle of Man Department of Transport in July and September 2008 included the installation of a storm drain and the completion of the mini-roundabout.

The Isle of Man TT Races and Manx Grand Prix continue to use the original A18 Bemahague Road (designated as Old Bemahague Road which runs parallel to the new link road) and the Governor's Dip for motorcycle racing, avoiding the new road sections.
