= František Bartoš (motorcyclist) =

Czech motorcycle racer

- Nationality: Czech
Motorcycle racing career statistics
Grand Prix motorcycle racing
Active years	1956 - 1957
First race	1956 Isle of Man 250cc Lightweight TT
Last race	1957 250cc Belgian Grand Prix
Team	ČZ
Starts / Wins / Podiums / Poles / F. laps / Points; 5 / 0 / 0 / N/A / N/A / 11

František Bartoš (10 May 1926 – 21 January 1987) was a Czech Grand Prix motorcycle road racer. He enjoyed his best season as a rider for the ČZ factory racing team in 1957, when he finished the season in ninth place in the 125cc world championship.

== Motorcycle Grand Prix results ==
Position	1	2	3	4	5	6
Points	8	6	4	3	2	1

(key) (Races in italics indicate fastest lap)

Year	Class	Team	1	2	3	4	5	6	Points	Rank	Wins
1956	125cc	ČZ	IOM	NED; 6	BEL	GER	ULS	NAT	1	19th	0
1956	250cc	ČZ	IOM; 5	NED	BEL	GER	ULS	NAT	2	12th	0
1957	125cc	ČZ	GER	IOM	NED	BEL; 4	ULS	NAT	3	9th	0
1957	250cc	ČZ	GER	IOM; 4	NED	BEL; 5	ULS	NAT	5	11th	0
