= Mondial Piega 1000 =

Italian sport motorbike

- Manufacturer: Mondial
- Production: 2002–2004
- Class: Sport bike
- Engine: 999 cc (61.0 cu in) liquid cooled, four-stroke, DOHC, 4 valves/cylinder, 90° V-Twin
- Transmission: 6-speed manual

The Mondial Piega 1000 is an exotic, limited production Italian sport bike made by Mondial. The engine is from Honda, the same V-twin used on the VTR-1000 SP-1.

== Specifications ==
All specifications are for the Mondial Piega, manufacturer claimed and estimated. Differences for the Evolution model are shown after a double slash, i.e. //

=== Engine ===
- Type: Liquid-cooled, four-stroke 90° V-Twin DOHC, 4 valves/cylinder
- Capacity: 999 cc
- Bore/Stroke: 100 mm × 63.6 mm (3.94 in × 2.50 in)
- Compression ratio: 10.8:1
- Fuel system: Electronic Fuel Injection
- Ignition: Mondial Software Control Unit

=== Transmission ===
- Primary Drive: Gear
- Final Drive: Chain
- Clutch: Wet, Multi-plate
- Gearbox: 6-speed

=== Cycle parts ===
- Frame: Tubular chromium-molybdenum-vanadium steel trellis; Öhlins steering damper
- Swingarm: Tubular chromium-molybdenum-vanadium steel trellis wrapped in carbon-fiber
- Front wheel: // Evo: Marchesini
- Rear wheel: // Evo: Marchesini
- Front tyre: 120/70 ZR 17
- Rear tyre: 180/50 ZR 17 // Evo: 180/55 ZR 17
- Front suspension: Paioli 46 mm TiN upside down forks // Evo: Öhlins 43 mm TiN upside-down forks
- Rear suspension: Öhlins
- Front brakes: Brembo dual 310 mm discs with 4-piston calipers // Evo: dual 320 mm discs with 4 piston Radial Calipers
- Rear brakes: single 200 mm disc with 2-piston calipers // Evo: single 220 mm

=== Dimensions ===
- Length: ? mm (? in): // Evo: 2000 mm (78.7 in)
- Width (w/mirrors): // Evo: 990 mm (39 in)
- Height: ? mm (in)
- Seat height: 820 mm (32.3 in)
- Wheelbase: 1398 mm (55 in) // Evo: 1420 mm (55.9 in)
- Rake: // Evo: 26°
- Trail:
- Weight (dry): 179 kg // Evo: 178 kg
- Fuel Tank capacity: 20 L (reserve 3 L) // Evo: 18 L (reserve 3.8 L)

=== Performance ===
(measured at crankshaft)

- Maximum Power: 101.4 kW (136 bhp) @ 9,500 rpm // Evo: 104.4 kW (140 bhp) @ 9,800 rpm
- Maximum Torque: 110 Nm (81.1 ft·lbf) @ 8,500 rpm // Evo: 100 Nm (73.8 ft·lbf) @ 8,000 rpm
