= Walter Zeller (motorcyclist) =

German motorcycle racer

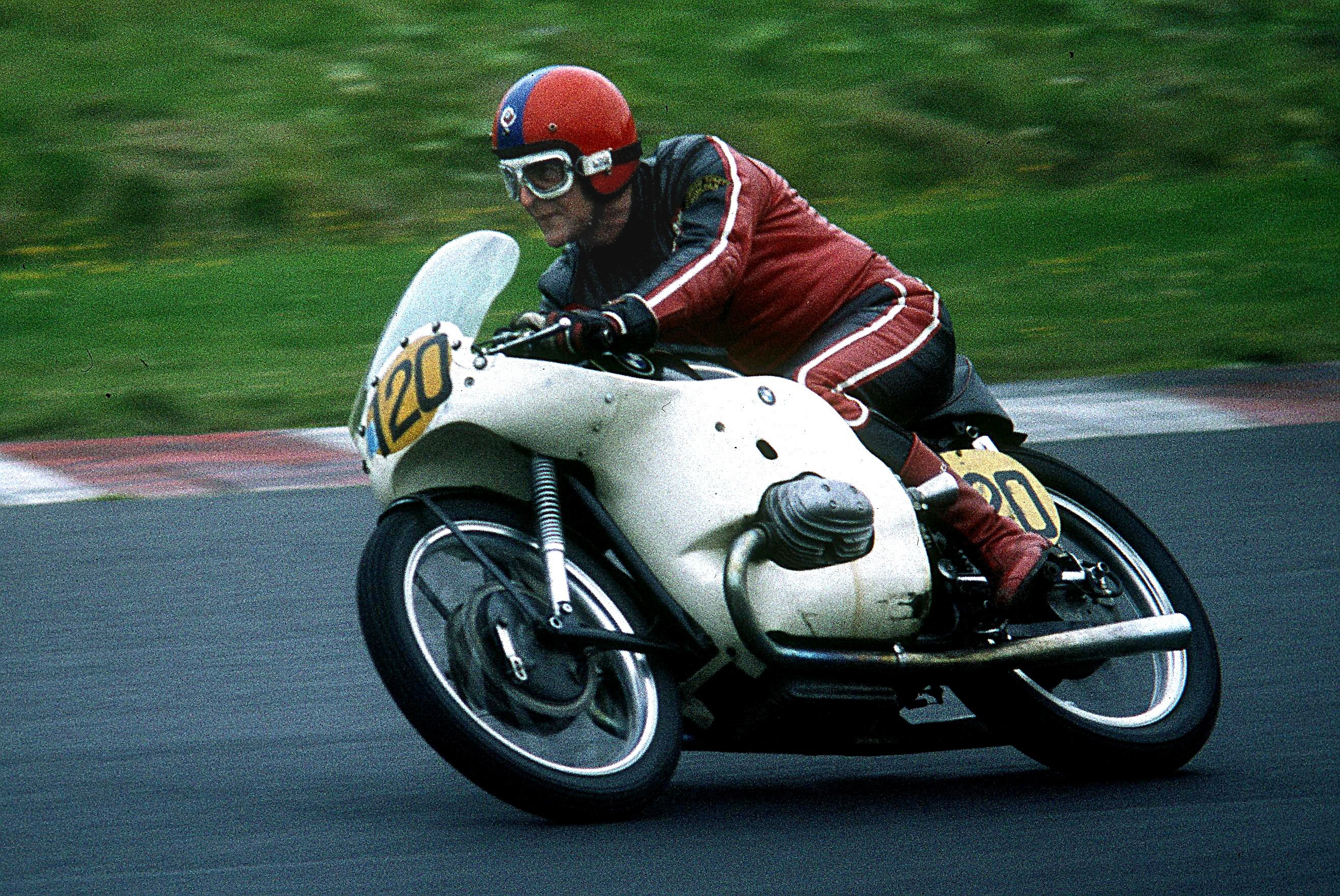
- Walter Zeller in 1979
- Nationality: German
Motorcycle racing career statistics
Grand Prix motorcycle racing
Active years	1955 – 1957
First race	1955 500cc West German Grand Prix
Last race	1957 500cc Dutch TT
Team	BMW
Starts / Wins / Podiums / Poles / F. laps / Points; 7 / 0 / 5 / N/A / N/A / 30

Walter Zeller (born 11 September 1927 in Ebersberg; died 4 February 1995) was a former Grand Prix motorcycle road racer from Germany who rode for the BMW factory racing team. His best year was in 1956 when he finished the season second in the 500cc world championship behind John Surtees.

== Motorcycle Grand Prix results ==
**Position**	1	2	3	4	5	6
**Points**	8	6	4	3	2	1

(key) (Races in bold indicate pole position; races in italics indicate fastest lap)

Year	Class	Team	1	2	3	4	5	6	7	8	Points	Rank	Wins
1955	500cc	BMW	ESP -	FRA -	IOM -	GER; 2	BEL -	NED -	ULS -	NAT -	6	7th	0
1956	500cc	BMW	IOM; 4	NED; 2	BEL; 2	GER; Ret	ULS; Ret	NAT; 6			16	**2nd**	0
1957	500cc	BMW	GER; 3	IOM; Ret	NED; 3	BEL; Ret	ULS -	NAT -			8	6th	0
