= Clypse Course =

Motorcycle racing course on the Isle of Man

- Location: Onchan, Isle of Man
- Coordinates: 54°10′18″N 4°29′31″W
- Opened: 1954
- Closed: 1959
- Major events: Isle of Man TT; Sidecar World Championship
- Length: 17.63 km (10.95 mi)
- Turns: 34
- Race lap record: 8:04.2, 80.42mph (Tarquinio Provini, MV Agusta, 1959, 250 cc)

The Clypse Course describes a motor-cycle racing course used for the Isle of Man TT Races between 1954 and 1959.

The course is 10.92 mi (17.57 km) long and is in the parish of Onchan in the Isle of Man. The course uses two short sections of the Snaefell Mountain Course which includes the primary A18 road between Cronk-ny-Mona and Creg-ny-Baa used in the reverse direction. Also, the primary A18 Mountain Road between Signpost Corner and Governor's Bridge. The highest point of the course is 856 ft (261 m) above sea level at Ballacarrooin Hill (Ordnance Survey grid reference SC 406 827). The name Clypse is probably a contraction from the Scandinavian word Kleppsstar ( Kleppr's farm) which gives the modern name of Clypse Beg and Clypse Mooar.

== History ==
The Clypse Course was a new street circuit for racing in the Isle of Man was used to re-introduce the Ultra-Lightweight TT and Sidecar TT Race for the 1954 Isle of Man TT Races. To facilitate racing on the Clypse Course, during the winter of 1953/54 road widening occurs on the Mountain Course at Creg-na-Baa, Signpost Corner and the approach to Governor's Bridge. The re-introduction of the Sidecar TT Race for the 1954 Isle of Man TT Race was controversial as it was opposed by the motor-cycle manufacturers and also for the inclusion of the first female competitor Inge Stoll at an Isle of Man TT race.

The Lightweight TT Race was run on the Clypse Course for the first time in 1955 and continued until the 1959 race. The Clubman Races were run on the Clypse Course for 1955, then reverting to the Snaefell Mountain Course for the next year. The last year for racing on the Clypse Course was the 1959 Isle of Man TT Race.

For 1960, the Lightweight, Ultra-Lightweight and Sidecar TT Races reverted to the Mountain Course.

== Speed and lap records ==
The lap record for the Clypse Course is 8 Minutes and 4.2 seconds at an average speed of 80.22 mph (129.10 km/h) set by Tarquinio Provini during the 1959 Lightweight TT Race.

== Legacy ==
The Clypse Course has not been used since 1959. Parts of the Clypse Course that are not part of the Snaefell Mountain Course have been used for cycle racing, Hill Climb events and Classic Car Racing. Parts of the Clypse Course which include the secondary road B12 Creg-na-Baa 'Back-Road' and the B20 Begoade Road are regularly used for the Rally Isle of Man and the Manx Rally.

== Winners at the Clypse Course ==
=== Winners (riders) ===
# Wins	Rider	Wins	
# Wins	Rider	Category	Years won
4	(Italy) Carlo Ubbiali	Lightweight TT	1956
4	(Italy) Carlo Ubbiali	Ultra Lightweight TT	1955, 1956, 1958
4	(Italy) Tarquinio Provini	Lightweight TT	1958, 1959
4	(Italy) Tarquinio Provini	Ultra Lightweight TT	1957, 1959
3	(Germany) Walter Schneider	Sidecar TT	1955, 1958, 1959
3	(Germany) Hans Strauss	Sidecar TT	1955, 1958, 1959
2	(Germany) Manfred Grunwald	Sidecar TT	1956, 1957
2	(Germany) Fritz Hillebrand	Sidecar TT	1956, 1957
1	(Austria) Rupert Hollaus	Ultra Lightweight TT	1954
1	(United Kingdom) Les Nutt	Sidecar TT	1954
1	(United Kingdom) Eric Oliver	Sidecar TT	1954
1	(United Kingdom) Jimmy Buchan	Clubmans Junior TT	1955
1	(United Kingdom) Eddie Dow	Clubmans Senior TT	1955
1	(United Kingdom) Bill Lomas	Lightweight TT	1955
1	(United Kingdom) Cecil Sandford	Lightweight TT	1957

=== Winners (manufacturers) ===
# Wins	Manufacturer	Wins	
# Wins	Manufacturer	Category	Years won
8	(Italy) MV Agusta	Lightweight TT	1955, 1956, 1958, 1959
8	(Italy) MV Agusta	Ultra Lightweight TT	1955, 1956, 1958, 1959
5	(Germany) BMW	Sidecar TT	1955, 1956, 1957, 1958, 1959
2	(United Kingdom) BSA	Clubmans Senior TT	1955
2	(United Kingdom) BSA	Clubmans Junior TT	1955
2	(Italy) Mondial	Lightweight TT	1957
2	(Italy) Mondial	Ultra Lightweight TT	1957
1	(United Kingdom) Norton	Sidecar TT	1954
1	(Germany) NSU	Ultra Lightweight TT	1954

=== By year ===
Year	Ultra Lightweight TT		Lightweight TT		Sidecar TT			Clubmans Junior TT		Clubmans Senior TT		Report
Year	Rider	Manufacturer	Rider	Manufacturer	Rider	Passenger	Manufacturer	Rider	Manufacturer	Rider	Manufacturer	Report
1959	(Italy) Tarquinio Provini	MV Agusta	(Italy) Tarquinio Provini	MV Agusta	(Germany) Walter Schneider	(Germany) Hans Strauss	BMW					Report
1958	(Italy) Carlo Ubbiali	MV Agusta	(Italy) Tarquinio Provini	MV Agusta	(Germany) Walter Schneider	(Germany) Hans Strauss	BMW					Report
1957	(Italy) Tarquinio Provini	Mondial	(United Kingdom) Cecil Sandford	Mondial	(Germany) Fritz Hillebrand	(Germany) Manfred Grunwald	BMW					Report
1956	(Italy) Carlo Ubbiali	MV Agusta	(Italy) Carlo Ubbiali	MV Agusta	(Germany) Fritz Hillebrand	(Germany) Manfred Grunwald	BMW					Report
1955	(Italy) Carlo Ubbiali	MV Agusta	(United Kingdom) Bill Lomas	MV Agusta	(Germany) Walter Schneider	(Germany) Hans Strauss	BMW	(United Kingdom) Jimmy Buchan	BSA	(United Kingdom) Eddie Dow	BSA	Report
1954	(Austria) Rupert Hollaus	NSU			(United Kingdom) Eric Oliver	(United Kingdom) Les Nutt	Norton					Report
