= Willaston Circuit =

Road racing course on Isle of Man

Coordinates: 54.171711°N 4.476211°W

The Willaston Circuit is a 3.5-mile road racing course on the Isle of Man used for cycle racing and classic car racing. The inaugural race was in 1936 and the course was last used in 2000 by the Manx Motor Racing Club before the foot & mouth outbreak in the British Isles halted all motor racing on the Isle of Man in 2001.

The route passes the Mountain Course at TT Grandstand, turns right at Parkfield Corner, right at Willaston Corner, and then runs through Cronk-y-Berry and Edge's Corner before re-joining the mountain course at Cronk-ny-Mona and turning right again to Signpost Corner, The Nook and Governor's Bridge.
