= Inge Stoll =

German motorcycle racer

- Inge Stoll in 1947
- Nationality: German
- Born: 11 February 1930; Breinig, Germany
- Died: 24 August 1958 (aged 28); Brno, Czechoslovakia
Motorcycle racing career statistics
Isle of Man TT career
TTs contested	2 (1954, 1957)
TT wins	0
TT podiums	0

Ingeborg Stoll-Laforge (11 February 1930 – 24 August 1958) was a female German motorcycle racer.

== Early life ==
Ingeborg Stoll-Laforge was born on 11 February 1930, in the village of Breinig in Stolberg, near Aachen, Germany to Maria (née Moll) and Kurt Stoll. Her parents raced together, with Maria as Kurt's motorcycle sidecar passenger. Inge took over her mother's role in the sidecar when she turned 17.

== Racing career ==
Stoll began competing professionally as a female passenger in her father's NSU outfit in 1947. In December 1949, she married Belgian Jean Laforge but the marriage was short lived. Her father retired in 1951 to concentrate on running his driving school. She then joined sidecar driver Jacques Drion in 1952 and won the 1952 and 1954 French Sidecar Championships. Stoll and Drion competed in the World Sidecar Championship events from 1952 to 1957.

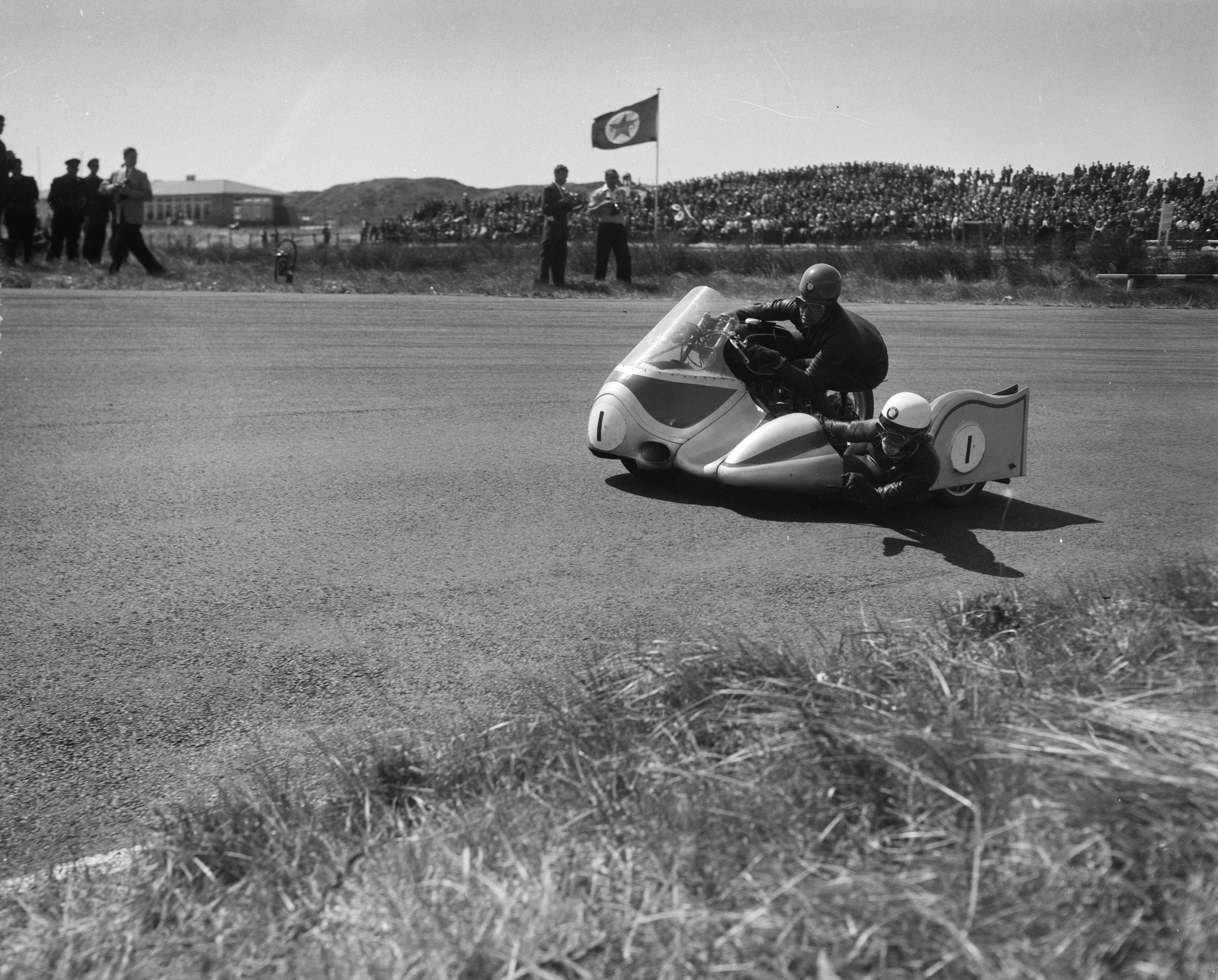
Zandvoort sidecar race. Jacques Drion driving with Ingeberg Stoll in sidecar

The re-introduction of the Sidecar TT race into the 1954 Isle of Man TT races was controversial as it was opposed by the motorcycle manufacturers and also for the inclusion of Inge Stoll as the first female competitor at an Isle of Man TT race.

In May 1958, Stoll married Manfred Grunwald and was planning to give up her racing career, but Drion was unable to find a new passenger so she agreed to ride with him for another race.

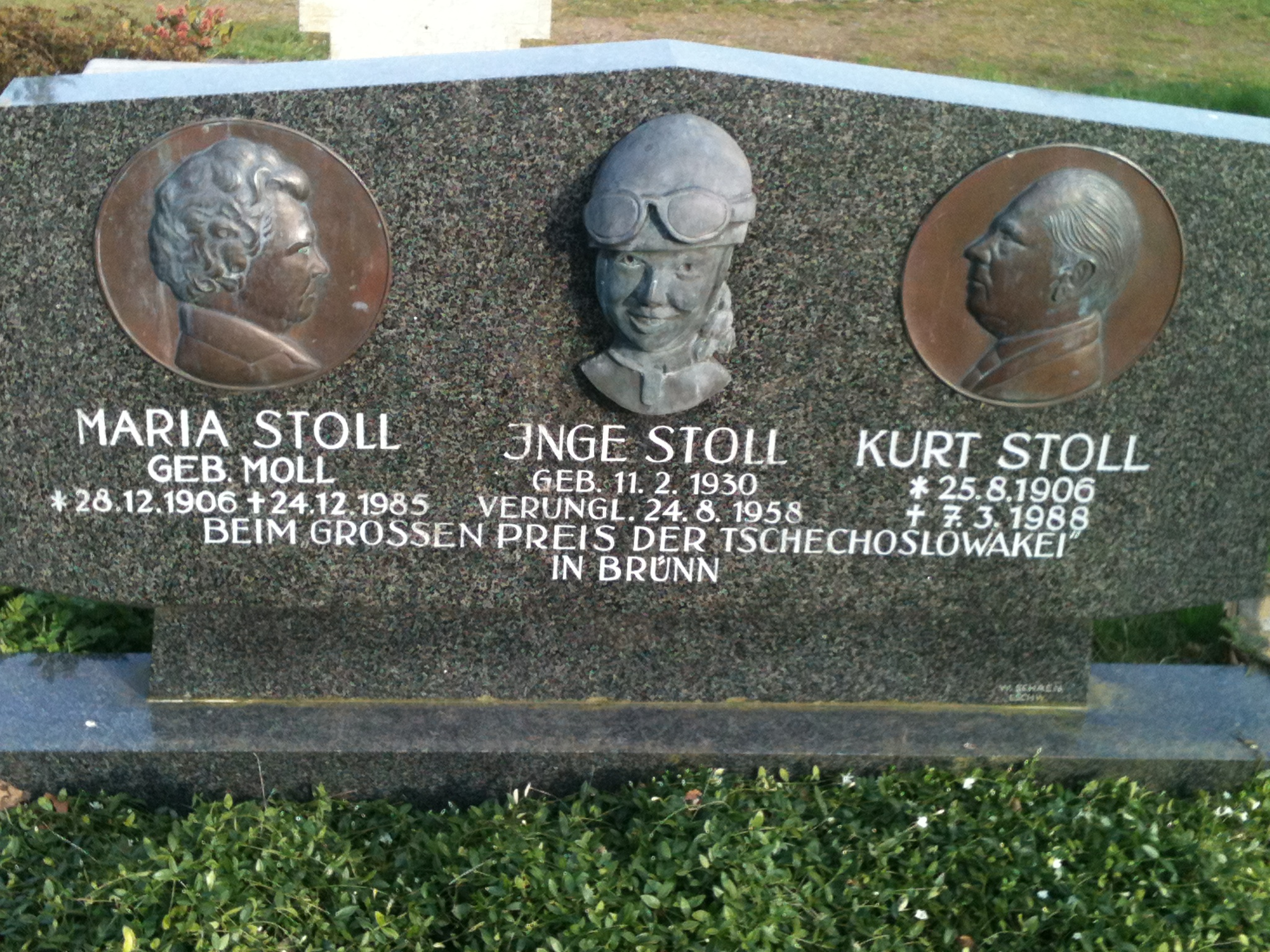
Stoll family burial memorial

At the 1958 Czechoslovakian Grand Prix, a non-championship event, the Norton sidecar outfit of Stoll and Drion, while holding second place, left the road on a right-hand corner during the penultimate lap. The machine hit a fence and overturned. Stoll was killed instantly and Drion died after being admitted to hospital.

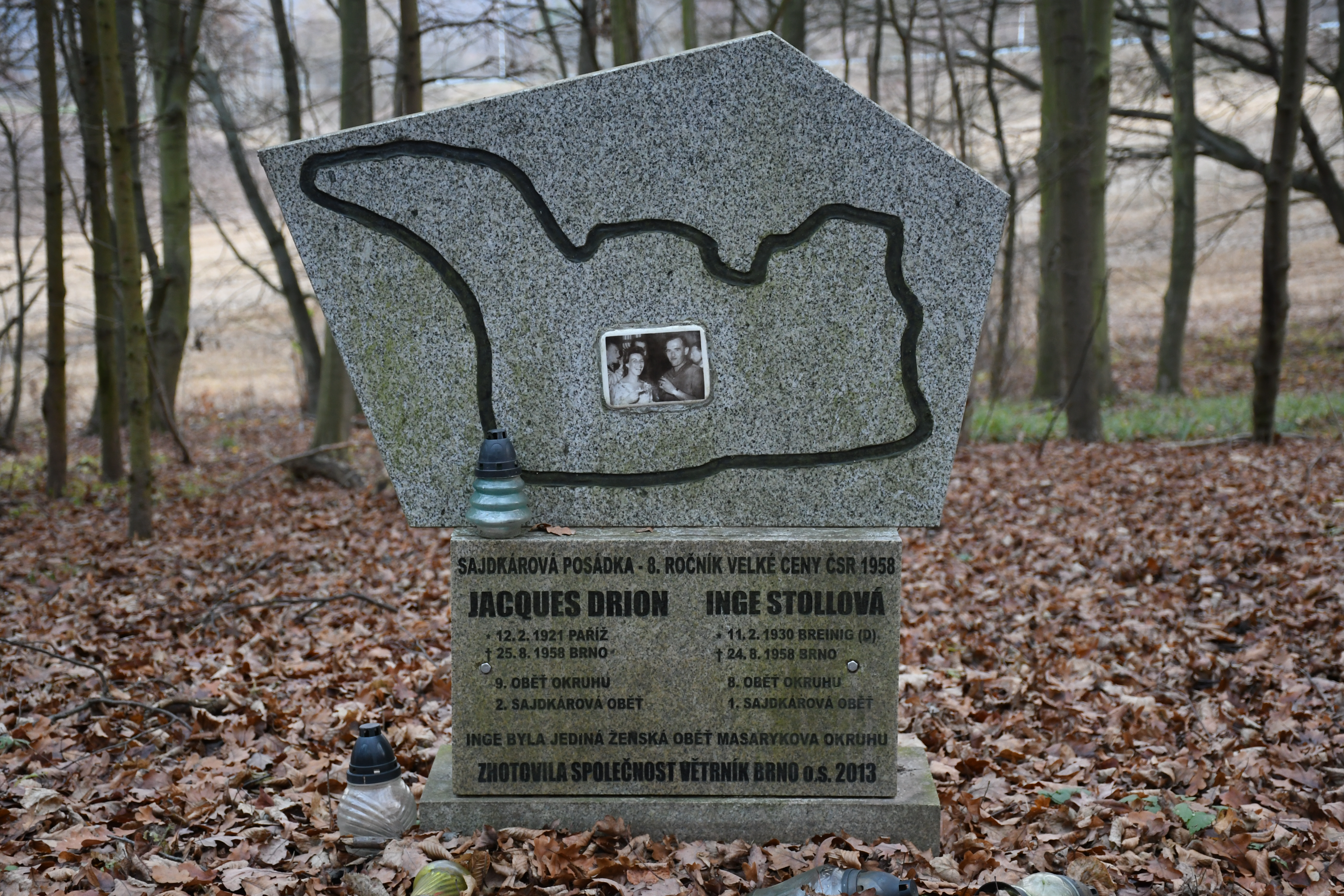
Memorial to Stoll and Drion near their fatal crash site

== Isle of Man TT race career ==
Year	Position	Race	Make of Motorcycle	Average Speed
1954	5th	Sidecar TT*	Norton	63.91 mph

- *Event held on Clypse Course
- DNF 1957 Sidecar TT Race, broken hand-hold.

TT Career Summary		
Finishing Position	5th	DNF
Number of times	1	1

== World Championship career 1952–1957 ==
Grand Prix career summary
Finishing position	2nd	3rd	4th	5th	6th
Number of times	1	3	4	5	3

- Total number of points: 48
