= Walter Schneider (motorcyclist) =

German motorcycle racer

- Nationality: German
- Born: 15 January 1927; Weidenau, Germany
- Died: 27 March 2010 (aged 83); Siegen, Germany
Motorcycle racing career statistics
Grand Prix motorcycle racing
Active years	1954 - 1959
First race	1954 Isle of Man Sidecar TT
Last race	1959 Belgian Sidecar Grand Prix
First win	1955 Isle of Man Sidecar TT
Last win	1959 Belgian Sidecar Grand Prix
Team	BMW
Championships	2
Starts / Wins / Podiums / Poles / F. laps / Points; / 7 / / N/A / N/A
Isle of Man TT career
TTs contested	6 (1954 - 1959)
TT wins	3
First TT win	1955 Sidecar TT
Last TT win	1959 Sidecar TT
TT podiums	4

Walter Schneider (15 January 1927 – 27 March 2010) was a German motorcycle, sidecar and car racer. In 1958 and 1959 he became Sidecar World Champion with Hans Strauß.

Schneider began his racing as a sidecar passenger in 1949 with Kurt Bäch before switching to the driver's seat the following year with Hans Wahl in the sidecar in the junior category. Moving to senior in 1951, by 1953 he finished fourth in the German Sidecar Championship on a privately prepared machine.

With a works BMW ride for 1954, the team soon were on the pace finishing fourth in their first race, the Sidecar TT on the Clypse Course. With every GP a top-five finish including a second in Germany, they ended the title in fourth position.

In 1955, Schneider and Strauß managed their first win, in the Sidecar TT, again on the Clypse Course. With two third places and a second they finished the season in third. The 1955 season was not so good, with only two points finishes ending up in tenth overall. 1957 was much better for the team, with two seconds and a first, at the Belgian motorcycle Grand Prix, finishing second in the title race.

In 1958, they won races at the Isle of Man, Belgium and Germany, and finished second in the Netherlands, results that secured the world championship.

The 1959 season saw almost as dominant a performance as the previous year, with two wins and two seconds enough to net another championship.

After winning his second world title, Schneider decided to retire from sidecar competition, only to take up car racing. After a massive crash in a BMW car in 1964 where he plunged several hundred metres down a slope, he decided to retire from competition.

In 1958, Schneider had opened a motor garage, later expanding to car repairs and finally a new car dealership selling Volkswagen, Audi and Skoda.

Sporting positions
Preceded by Fritz Hillebrand with Manfred Grunwal	World Sidecar Champion with Hans Strauß; 1954-1959	Succeeded by Helmut Fath with Alfred Wohlgemuth
