= August Hobl =

German motorcycle racer (born 1931)

- Nationality: German
Motorcycle racing career statistics
Grand Prix motorcycle racing
Active years	1953, 1955, 1956
First race	1953 250cc Dutch TT
Last race	1956 350cc Nations Grand Prix
Team	DKW
Starts / Wins / Podiums / Poles / F. laps / Points; 15 / 0 / 7 / N/A / N/A / 52

August Hobl (born 13 April 1931) is a German former professional Grand Prix motorcycle road racer. His best year was in 1956 when he rode a DKW motorcycle to finish the season ranked third in the 350cc world championship behind the Moto Guzzi teammates Bill Lomas and Dickie Dale.
