= 1954 Isle of Man TT =

Annual motorcycle racing event

(United Kingdom) 1954 Isle of Man TT
Race details
- Race 2 of 9 races in the 1954 Grand Prix motorcycle racing season
- Date: 14–19 June 1954
- Official name: Isle of Man Tourist Trophy
- Location: Isle of Man TT Mountain Circuit; Clypse Course (Ultra Lightweight and Sidecars)
- Course: Public roads; TT Course 60.72 km (37.73 mi); Clypse Course 17.63 km (10.95 mi)

500cc
- Rider
Fastest lap
Rider	(Federation of Rhodesia and Nyasaland) Ray Amm	Norton
Podium
First	(Federation of Rhodesia and Nyasaland) Ray Amm	Norton
Second	(United Kingdom) Geoff Duke	Gilera
Third	(United Kingdom) Jack Brett	Norton

350cc
- Rider
Fastest lap
Rider	(Federation of Rhodesia and Nyasaland) Ray Amm	Norton
Podium
First	(New Zealand) Rod Coleman	AJS
Second	(United Kingdom) Derek Farrant	AJS
Third	(United Kingdom) Bob Keeler	Norton

250cc
- Rider
Fastest lap
Rider	(Germany) Werner Haas	NSU
Podium
First	(Germany) Werner Haas	NSU
Second	(Austria) Rupert Hollaus	NSU
Third	(Republic of Ireland) Reg Armstrong	NSU

125cc
- Rider
Fastest lap
Rider	(Austria) Rupert Hollaus	NSU
Podium
First	(Austria) Rupert Hollaus	NSU
Second	(Italy) Carlo Ubbiali	MV Agusta
Third	(United Kingdom) Cecil Sandford	MV Agusta

Sidecar (B2A)
- Rider
Fastest lap
Rider	(United Kingdom) Eric Oliver	Norton
Podium
First	(United Kingdom) Eric Oliver	Norton
Second	(Germany) Fritz Hillebrand	BMW
Third	(Germany) Willi Noll	BMW

The 1954 Isle of Man Tourist Trophy was the second race in the 1954 Grand Prix motorcycle racing season and proved highly controversial for TT Course and race changes. The 1954 Junior TT was the first race where the official race distance was reduced from 7 laps to 5 laps. The 1954 Senior TT Race was stopped at half distance due to the weather conditions on the Mountain Section of the course.

The first world championship event for the 1954 Isle of Man TT Races was the 350cc Junior TT Race. The race was led on lap 1 by Fergus Anderson from Gilera team-mate Ken Kavanagh by 10 seconds and Ray Amm riding for Norton a further 6 seconds adrift in 3rd place. On lap 2, Fergus Anderson retired at Kirk Michael with an engine problem and Ken Kavanagh retired at the pits with an engine mis-fire on lap 3. The race was then led by Ray Amm by 24 seconds from Rod Coleman riding for AJS motor-cycles. However, Ray Amm retired at Barregarrow on lap 5 allowing Rod Coleman to become the first New Zealander to win an Isle of Man TT Race at an average race speed of 91.54 mph.

The new 10 lap (107.90 miles) Sidecar TT held on the Clypse Course was led from start to finish by Eric Oliver and passenger Les Nutt riding a Norton outfit with a "dust-bin" fairing at an average speed of 68.87 mph. The Norton outfit of Bill Boddice/J.Pirie hit a bank at Creg-ny-Baa and flipped over on lap 7, but continued on to finish the race in 6th place. The winner of the 1954 Lightweight TT race, Werner Haas crashed at Governor's Bridge on lap 1 of the 1954 Ultra-Lightweight TT Race, also held on the Clypse Course. This allowed Rupert Hollaus to win the race in 1 hour, 33 minutes and 3.4 seconds at an average race speed of 69.57 mph. His victory was notable because he was one of only seven riders to have won an Isle of Man TT race in their first attempt.

In deteriorating weather conditions and with reduced visibility on the Mountain Section of the course the 1954 Senior TT Race was held after a short delay and started at midday. Despite the conditions, Geoff Duke riding the works Gilera set a time of 25 minutes and 41.0 seconds an average speed of 88.18 mph and led Ray Amm riding for Norton by 14 seconds on lap 1. On the second lap, Geoff Duke lapped in 26 minutes and 23 seconds at an average speed of 85.84 mph and Ray Amm lapped at an average speed of 86.49 to reduce the lead to just 2 seconds. Further heavy rain and low cloud on the Mountain Section reduced speed further and the conditions caused John Grace and Ted Frend to retire at the TT Grandstand on lap 2 and Ray Amm used "feet-down" tactics on the slower corners. The leader, Geoff Duke, decided to refuel on lap 3. Ray Amm in second place went straight through without stopping and lapped in 25 minutes and 28 seconds at an average speed of 88.93 mph and now led Geoff Duke by 32 seconds. At the Windy Corner on lap 4, the visibility was down to 20 yards and a decision was made to stop the race because of the conditions. This allowed Ray Amm, due to refueling at the TT Grandstand on lap 4, to win the 1954 Senior TT Race in 1 hour, 42 minutes and 46.8 seconds at an average race speed of 88.12 mph. The controversial decision by race organisers to stop the 1954 Senior TT Race on lap 4, just as the weather started to improve, was protested by the Gilera management. This was on the grounds that the works Norton team were told of the decision allowing Ray Amm to lead the race on lap 3, but the official protest was rejected by the race organisers. During lap 1 of the 1954 Senior TT Race, Simon Sandys-Winsch riding a Junior Velocette crashed at the Highlander and died in hospital a few days later.

== Race results ==
=== 1954 Clubmans Senior Results ===
10 June 1954 – Mountain Course (4 laps – 150.92 miles)

Rank	Rider	Team	Speed	Time
1	(United Kingdom) Alistair King	BSA	85.76 mph	1:45.36.0
2	(United Kingdom) Ben Denton	BSA	85.69 mph	1:45.41.6
3	(United Kingdom) Ewan Haldane	BSA	85.26 mph	1:46.12.2
4	(United Kingdom) Tony Ovens	Triumph	84.47 mph	1:46.42.2
5	(United Kingdom) Maurice Baigent	BSA	84.74 mph	1:46.51.8
6	(United Kingdom) Percy Tait	BSA	84.58 mph	1:47.05.0
7	(United Kingdom) Dave Chadwick	Norton	83.20 mph	1:47.05.0
8	(United Kingdom) Eric Cheers	Triumph	76.53 mph	1:58.20.0
9	(United Kingdom) Len King	Triumph	82.92 mph	1:50.17.2
10	(United Kingdom) Eddie Dow	BSA	81.40 mph	1:50.33.0

=== 1954 Clubmans Junior Results ===
10 June 1954 – Mountain Course (4 laps – 150.92 miles)

Rank	Rider	Team	Speed	Time
1	(United Kingdom) Phillip Palmer	BSA	81.83 mph	1:50.39.4
2	(United Kingdom) Des Wright	BSA	81.68 mph	1:51.50.8
3	(United Kingdom) James Davie	BSA	81.66 mph	1:50.54.4
4	(United Kingdom) Sandy Bowie	BSA	81.56 mph	1:51.06.0
5	(United Kingdom) Geoff Tanner	Norton	81.54 mph	1:51.04.0
6	(United Kingdom) George Arnold	BSA	81.20 mph	1:51.30.8
7	(United Kingdom) Jimmy Buchan	BSA	80.75 mph	1:52.08.6
8	(United Kingdom) Willie Gibson	BSA	80.05 mph	1:53.08.0
9	(United Kingdom) J Muir	Norton	79.70 mph	1:53.08.0
10	(United Kingdom) Bill Robertson	BSA	78.37 mph	1:55.33.0

=== 1954 Isle of Man Junior TT 350cc final standings ===
14 June 1954 – 5 Laps (188.56 Miles) Mountain Course.

Place	Rider	Number	Machine	Speed	Time	Points
1	(New Zealand) Rod Coleman		AJS	91.51 mph	2:03.41.8	8
2	(United Kingdom) Derek Farrant		AJS	90.14 mph	2:05.35.0	6
3	(United Kingdom) Bob Keeler		Norton	90.03 mph	2:04.43.6	4
4	(New Zealand) Leo T Simpson		AJS	89.17 mph	2:06.58.8	3
5	(United Kingdom) Peter A Davey		Norton	88.13 mph	2:08.26.4	2
6	(United Kingdom) John R Clark		AJS	90.49 mph	2:08.26.4	1

=== 1954 Isle of Man Lightweight TT 250cc final standings ===
14 June 1954 – 3 Laps (113.00 Miles) Mountain Course.

Place	Rider	Number	Machine	Speed	Time	Points
1	(West Germany) Werner Haas		NSU	90.88 mph	1:14.44.4	8
2	(Austria) Rupert Hollaus		NSU	89.99 mph	1:15.28.6	6
3	(Republic of Ireland) Reg Armstrong		NSU	89.92 mph	1:15.31.8	4
4	(West Germany) Hermann Paul Müller		NSU	88.87 mph	1:16.25.6	3
5	(United Kingdom) Fergus Anderson		Moto Guzzi	86.48 mph	1:18.32.2	2
6	(West Germany) Hans Baltisberger		NSU	86.46 mph	1:18.33.6	1

=== 1954 Isle of Man Ultra-Lightweight TT 125cc final standings ===
16 June 1954 – 10 Laps (107.90 miles) Clypse Course.

Place	Rider	Number	Machine	Speed	Time	Points
1	(Austria) Rupert Hollaus		NSU	69.57 mph	1:33.03.4	8
2	(Italy) Carlo Ubbiali		MV Agusta	69.52 mph	1:37.07.4	6
3	(United Kingdom) Cecil Sandford		MV Agusta	66.35 mph	1:37.35.8	4
4	(West Germany) Hans Baltisberger		NSU	65.78 mph	1:38.25.2	3
5	(Canada) Ivor Lloyd		MV Agusta	62.68 mph	1:43.16.6	2
6	(United Kingdom) Brian Purslow		MV Agusta	60.84 mph	1:46.24.6	1

=== 1954 Sidecar TT final standings ===
16 June 1954 – 10 Laps (107.90 miles) Clypse Course.

Place	Rider	Passenger	Number	Machine	Speed	Time	Points
1	(United Kingdom) Eric Oliver	Les Nutt		Norton	68.87 mph	1:34.00.2	8
2	(West Germany) Fritz Hillebrand	Manfred Grünwald		BMW	67.48 mph	1:35.56.2	6
3	(West Germany) Willi Noll	Fritz Cron		BMW	65.22 mph	1:39.16.4	4
4	(West Germany) Walter Schneider	Hans Strauss		BMW	64.45 mph	1:40.27.4	3
5	(France) Jacques Drion	Inge Stoll		Norton	61.91 mph	1:41.18.8	2
6	(United Kingdom) Bill Boddice	John Pirie		Norton	62.28 mph	1:43.22.8	1

=== 1954 Isle of Man Senior TT 500cc final standings ===
Friday 18 June 1954 – 4 Laps (150.74 Miles) Mountain Course. (Reduced Race Distance)

Place	Rider	Number	Machine	Speed	Time	Points
1	(Federation of Rhodesia and Nyasaland) Ray Amm	93	Norton	88.12 mph	1:42.46.8	8
2	(United Kingdom) Geoff Duke	76	Gilera	87.19 mph	1:43.52.6	6
3	(United Kingdom) Jack Brett	56	Norton	86.04 mph	1:45.15.2	4
4	(Republic of Ireland) Reg Armstrong	53	Gilera	86.63 mph	1:45.45.6	3
5	(South Africa) Rudy Allison	64	Norton	83.85 mph	1:48.06.6	2
6	(Australia) Gordon Laing	22	Norton	83.85 mph	1:48.37.2	1

== Notes ==
- The 1954 World Championship season was used to reintroduce the Ultra-Lightweight TT and Sidecar TT Race to the Isle of Man TT Races. A new race circuit, the Clypse Course, was used for the new races.
- To facilitate racing on the Clypse Course, during the winter of 1953/54 road widening occurred on the Snaefell mountain course at Creg-ny-Baa, Signpost Corner, Cronk-ny-Mona and the approach to Governor's Bridge. Other major course alterations for the 1954 Isle of Man TT Races included the removal of a cottage at Appledene, road widening at Handley's Corner, Barregarrow, Ballaugh Bridge and Kerrowmoar.
- The course alterations were criticised by leading TT competitor Ray Amm, who described the situation as a "Lot of trash to say the machines are beyond control..." and "To keep altering the course like this which has been going for 50 years is pure sacrilege they are wrecking it....It will finish-up like a racing bowl with all the character gone."
- The reintroduction of the Sidecar TT Race was controversial and the motorcycle manufacturers "declare themselves as appalled" by the inclusion of a sidecar race. It was also opposed by the motorcycle manufacturers for the inclusion of the first female competitor, Inge Stol at an Isle of Man TT race. The matter of female competitors was raised in the Isle of Man Parliament, but "Tynwald refused to ban the Fräulein."
- A first-time visitor to the Isle of Man TT Races was Soichiro Honda the founder of Honda Motor Co., Ltd. (In 1959, a works Honda team arrived to compete in the TT for the first time).
- A number of accidents occurred during practice week. During Monday evening practice, R.J.Ashford riding an AJS was killed instantly after crashing at Laurel Bank. At Sarah's Cottage, during Wednesday evening practice, Bob McIntyre riding an AJS suffered a cut chin and concussion after a crash and was detained in Noble's Hospital. Also, Keith Campbell suffered a broken right foot and Bob Cooper a broken collar bone at incidents at Sarah's Cottage, both riding AJS motor-cycles in the Junior class.
- On Lap 1 of the Junior race, Jack Brett riding for Norton retired at Ramsey with an engine problem. At Sulby, Bob McIntyre, riding an AJS, retired with an engine problem. Riding a Norton, Maurice Quincey pushed in from Governor's Bridge and retired.
- At the Quarterbridge on lap 1 of the Senior TT, Derek Farrant riding for AJS crashed along with E. Houseley also riding an AJS. On lap 2, Fergus Anderson riding for Moto Guzzi retired at Barregarrow after falling off. At the Stonebreakers Hut the Norton of E.W.L.Hunt hit the bank and he retired.
