= Sidecar TT =

Isle of Man motorcycle road race

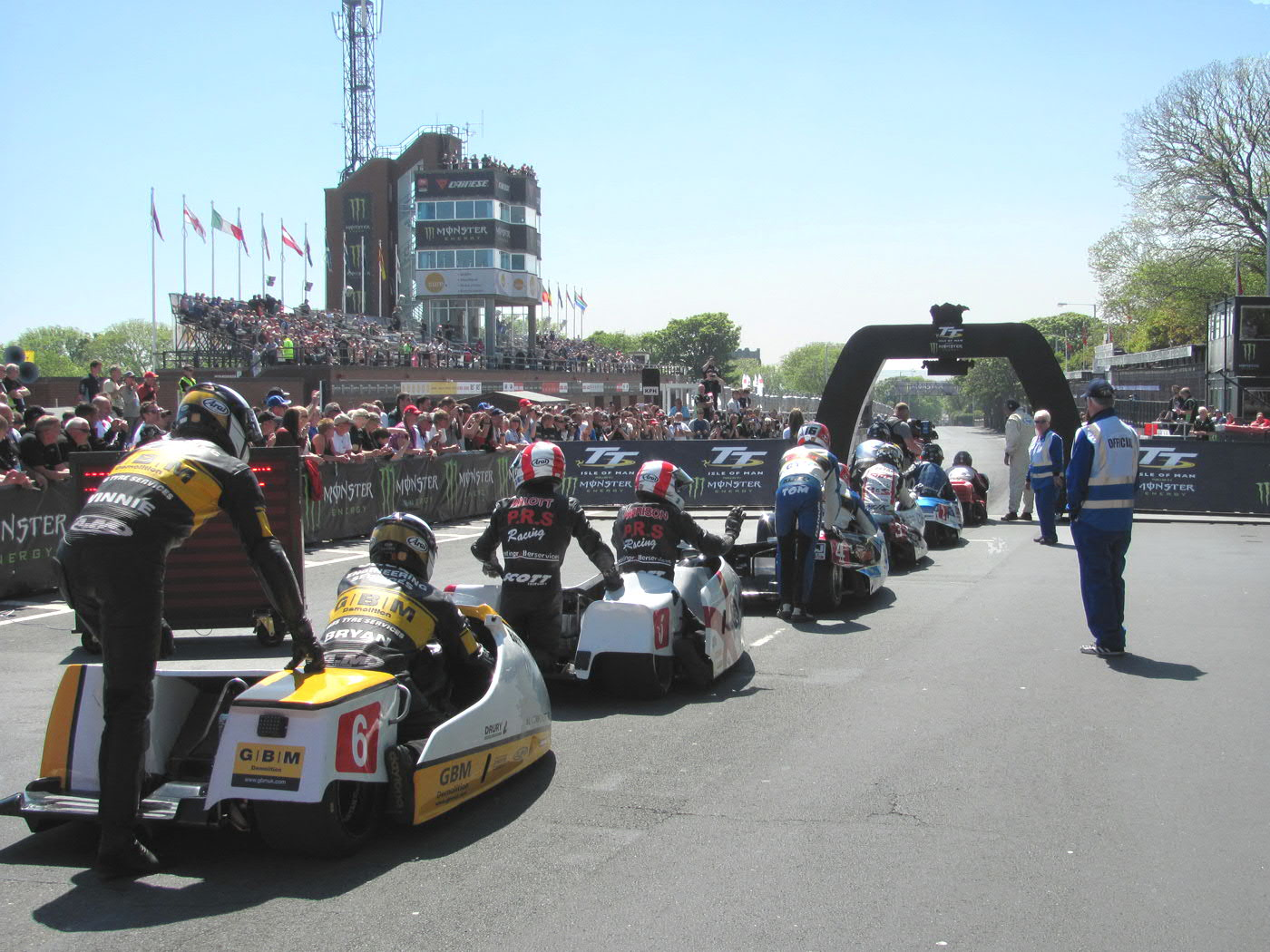
Competitors for Sidecar TT Race 2 line up to start the race at TT Grandstand, 5 June 2013

The Sidecar TT is a motorcycle-with-sidecar road race competition held over two legs which takes place during the Isle of Man TT festival, an annual event at the end of May and beginning of June. Between 1954 and 1976 this race was part of the Grand Prix motorcycle racing world championship.

== Engine capacity ==
The 1923 races was the first time the Sidecar TT race was run, over 3 laps (113 miles (182 km)) of the Mountain Course won by Freddie Dixon and passenger T.W.Denney with a special Douglas banking-sidecar at an average race speed of 53.15 mph (85.54 km/h). For the 1926 races the Sidecar TT and Ultra-Lightweight TT were dropped due to lack of entries.

The Sidecar TT race was re-introduced in the 1954 event for machines not exceeding 500 cc engine capacity, run on the Clypse Course. A non-championship 750 cc class for sidecars was introduced for the 1968 event. From 1975, the previous 500 cc and 750 classes were replaced by a 1000 cc engine capacity class. For 1976 the event became a race held over two-legs. The new FIM Formula 2 class for Sidecar outfits was introduced for the 1990 races.

- 1954–1959 Sidecars not exceeding 500 cc engine capacity. Race held on Clypse Course.
- 1960–1976 World Championship event held on Snaefell Mountain Course not exceeding 500 cc.
- 1968–1974 Non-Championship event not exceeding 750 cc.
- 1975–1989 not exceeding 1000 cc engine capacity.
- 1990– onwards FIM Formula 2 Sidecar race for two-stroke engines not exceeding 350 cc or four-stroke engines not exceeding 600 cc.

== Eligibility ==
=== Entrants ===
- Entrants must be in possession of a valid National Entrants or FIM Sponsors Licence for Road Racing.
- Sidecar Passengers must hold a TT Course Licence as a passenger.

=== Formula Two Sidecar TT specifications ===
The 2012 specification for entries into the Sidecar TT race were defined as any machine complying with the following specifications:

- Machines must comply with general technical rules as per ACU Standing Regulations and 2012 IOM TT regulations.
  - Engine Types
    - 501 – 600cc, 4 stroke, 4 cylinder, production based motor-cycle engines.
    - Rotary engines are not permitted.
    - Fuel injection systems are permitted using only the throttle-bodies as homologated for the motorcycle engine used by the entrant.
    - Electronic traction control system is prohibited. Wheel speed sensors are not permitted.
  - General Construction
    - The Sidecar may be placed either side of the motorcycle. Hinged sidecars and steerable sidecar wheels are prohibited.
    - The three road wheels may be disposed as to give two or three tracks.
    - If three tracks are made then the centres of the tracks of the motorcycle shall not be more than 75mm apart.
    - The main chassis frame must consist of, at a minimum – a steering head, a frame to accommodate the engine and a main spar to the sidecar wheel which will be made from good quality steel tube.
    - The tubing used for the construction of the frame may be of a circular or non-circular section, and the outside diameter shall not exceed 101.6mm.
    - Minimum suspension travel to be no less than 20mm.
    - Monocoque construction is prohibited and the use of composite construction is forbidden with the single exception of the sidecar platform (i.e. aluminium or carbon fibre skinned honeycomb).
  - Engine Position
    - The engine must be positioned behind the steering head and in front of the driver.
    - The final drive must be transmitted to the road through the rear wheel of the motorcycle. An engine positioned behind the driver and in front of the rear drive wheel is prohibited.
    - The engine must be positioned so that the centre-line of the engine will not exceed 160mm beyond the centre-line of the rear wheel of the motorcycle.
  - Dimensions
    - Width (Overall Maximum) 1575 mm. Wheelbase (Maximum) 1651 mm. Track 800 mm minimum, 1105mm maximum. Height (Overall Maximum) 800 mm
    - Weight (Minimum) 136.5 kg without fuel. The addition of ballast to reach this official minimum weight is prohibited.
  - Wheels
    - Wheel rim diameter of 254 mm and 64mm in width. The diameter of the tyre must be as least 400mm and the width 100mm; maximum front tyre width 220mm. The use of slick tyres is permitted.
  - Steering
    - Steering of the front wheel must be by a non-adjustable handlebars securely fixed to the forks or yokes of the motorcycle with no intermediate push or pull rods and all steering elements must be located on the sprung portion of the front suspension unit.
  - Brakes
    - All three wheels must be braked and use only ferrous brake discs.

=== Official qualification time ===
- 115% of the time set by the third fastest qualifier in the class.

== Speed and lap records ==
The lap record for the Sidecar TT is 18 minutes and 45.85 seconds, an average speed of 120.645 mph (194.159 km/h) set by Ben Birchall and passenger Tom Birchall during Race 2 in 2023. They also set a new race record of 56 minutes and 41.816 seconds, an average race speed of 119.784 mph (192.774 km/h) for 3 laps (113 miles (182 km)) of the Mountain Course, bettering their own race-record set in 2018.

== Sidecar TT race winners ==
=== By driver ===
Rider	Wins
Dave Molyneux	17
Ben Birchall	14
Rob Fisher	10
Mick Boddice, Dave Saville, Siegfried Schauzu	9
Nick Crowe	5
Klaus Enders, Trevor Ireson, Jock Taylor	4
Ryan Crowe, Max Deubel, Klaus Klaffenböck, Walter Schneider*, Rolf Steinhausen	3
Geoff Bell, Lowry Burton, Dick Greasley, Fritz Hillebrand*, Mac Hobson, John Holden	2
Steve Abbott, Georg Auerbacher, Florian Camathias, Freddie Dixon, M. Hamblin, Roy Hanks, Conrad Harrison, Helmut Fath, Heinz Luthringshauser, George O'Dell, Eric Oliver*, Les Parker, C. Prichard, Tim Reeves, Nigel Rollason, Fritz Scheidegger, George H. Tucker, Chris Vincent, Terry Vinicombe	1

- *Indicates Sidecar TT wins on the Clypse Course.

=== By passenger ===
Rider	Wins
Tom Birchall	14
Rick Long, Dan Sayle	8
C.Birks, W.Kalauch	6
D.Hall	5
Bengt Johannson, H.Schneider,	4
Callum Crowe, R.Englehardt, Patrick Farrance, Darren Hope, E.Horner, C.Pollington, H.Strauss*, D.Williams	3
M.Grunwald*, K.Cornbill, Mark Cox, Pat.Cushnahan, R.Crossely, K.Ellison, P.Hill, B.Hutchinson, N.Roche, D.Wells, Andrew Winkle, Mick Wynn	2
Mike Aylott, K.Arthur, N.Burgess, M.Burns, N.Carpenter, S.Collins, A.Herzig, E.Bliss, J.Flaxman, J.Gibbard, H.Hahn, Craig Hallam, Colin Hardman, D.Jewell, J.Robinson, K.Morgan, L.Nutt*, J.Parkins, T.W.Denney, G.Russell, R.Smith, S.Smith, A.Wohlegemuth	1

- *Indicates Sidecar TT wins on the Clypse Course.

=== By marque ===
Marque	Wins
Yamaha	40
Honda	26
BMW	25
Kawasaki, Suzuki	3
BSA, Konig, LMS, Norton	2

== See also ==
- TT Zero
- Ultra-Lightweight TT
- Lightweight TT
- Junior TT
- Senior TT
