= FB Mondial (motorcycle manufacturer) =

Italian motorcycle manufacturer

Mondial Moto
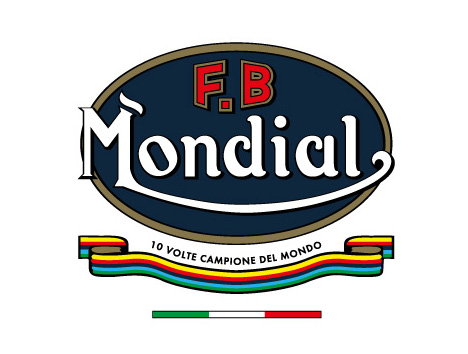
- Industry: Motorcycle manufacturing
- Founded: 1929; 97 years ago, Milan
- Founder: Carlo Boselli, Luigi Boselli, Ettore Boselli, Giuseppe Boselli, Ada Boselli
- Headquarters: Manerbio, Italy
- Area served: Worldwide
- Products: Motorcycles; Scooters
- Website: fbmondial.com

FB Mondial is a motorcycle manufacturer, founded in 1929, in Milan, Italy. They are best known for their domination of Motorcycle World Championships between 1949 and 1957. The firm produced some of the most advanced and successful Grand Prix road racers of the time, winning five rider and five manufacturer World Championships in that short period.

== Early history (1929–1943) ==
FB Mondial was born under the impulse of the Boselli brothers Luigi, Carlo, Ettore and Ada. FB stands for "Fratelli Boselli" (English: Boselli Brothers). Father of the entrepreneurial brothers was Giuseppe Boselli, a well-respected pilot and co-owner of GD, an Italian motorcycle company from Bologna.

Initially, a workshop was opened for sales and service of G.D models, but within a few months, it soon became clear that there was a market demand for a cheap and robust motorbike. During his years as a competitive motorcyclist, Count Giuseppe Boselli had met Oreste Drusiani, a well-known engine builder and the pair struck a deal. It was in Oreste's farm in Bologna that FB established its first production site, dedicating itself to the construction of motorbikes.

After steady success in their early years, in 1943 FB decided to expand their production capability and buy modern machinery to increase production. Unfortunately they could not put their plan into practice, as on 24 July 1943, a heavy allied bombing struck the Bologna railway station and its surroundings, shaking the farm. The machinery survived, but was commandeered by the military to aid in the war effort, putting production on hold for the duration of the war.

== Post-war era (1948–1979) ==
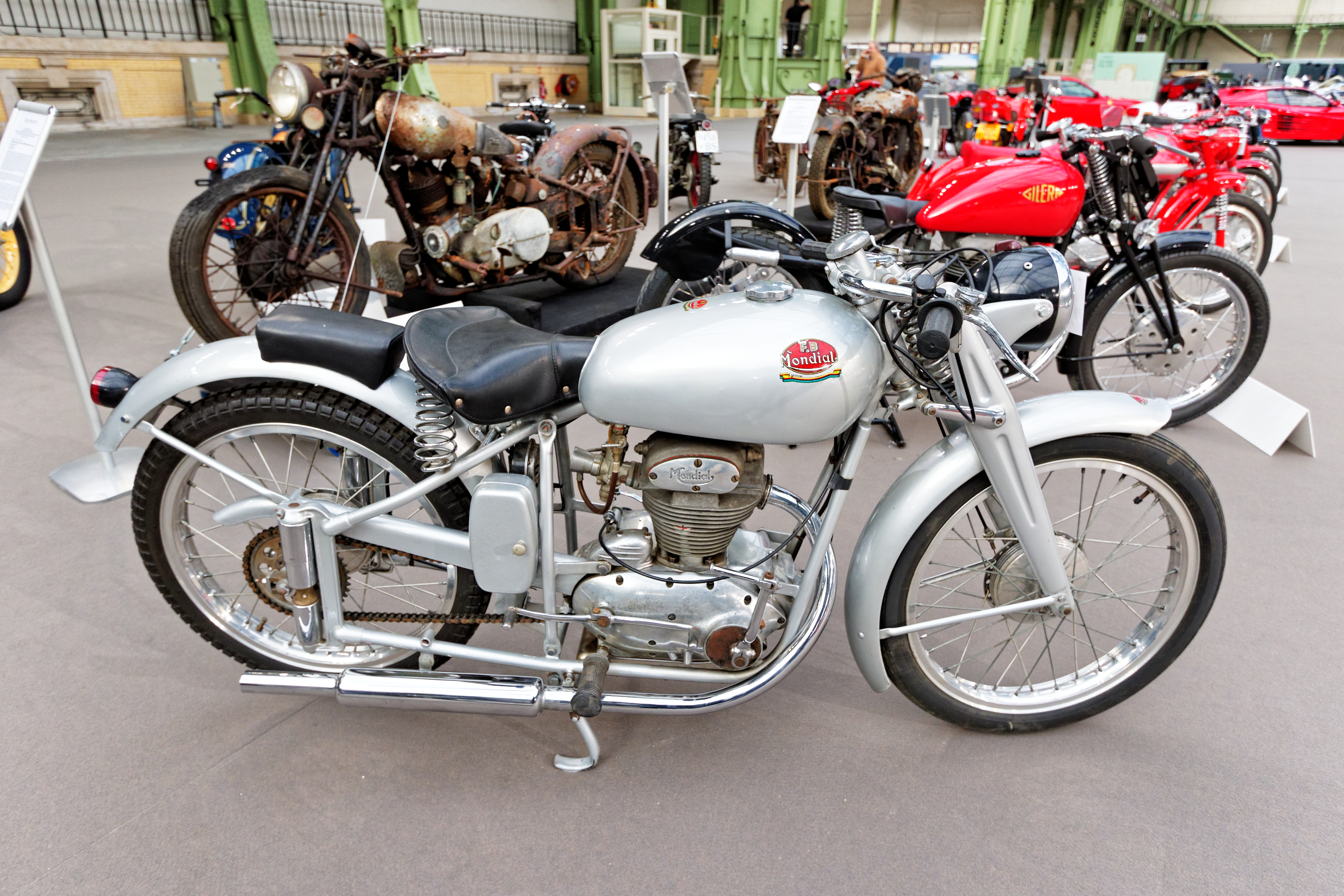
FB Mondial 125cc – 1949

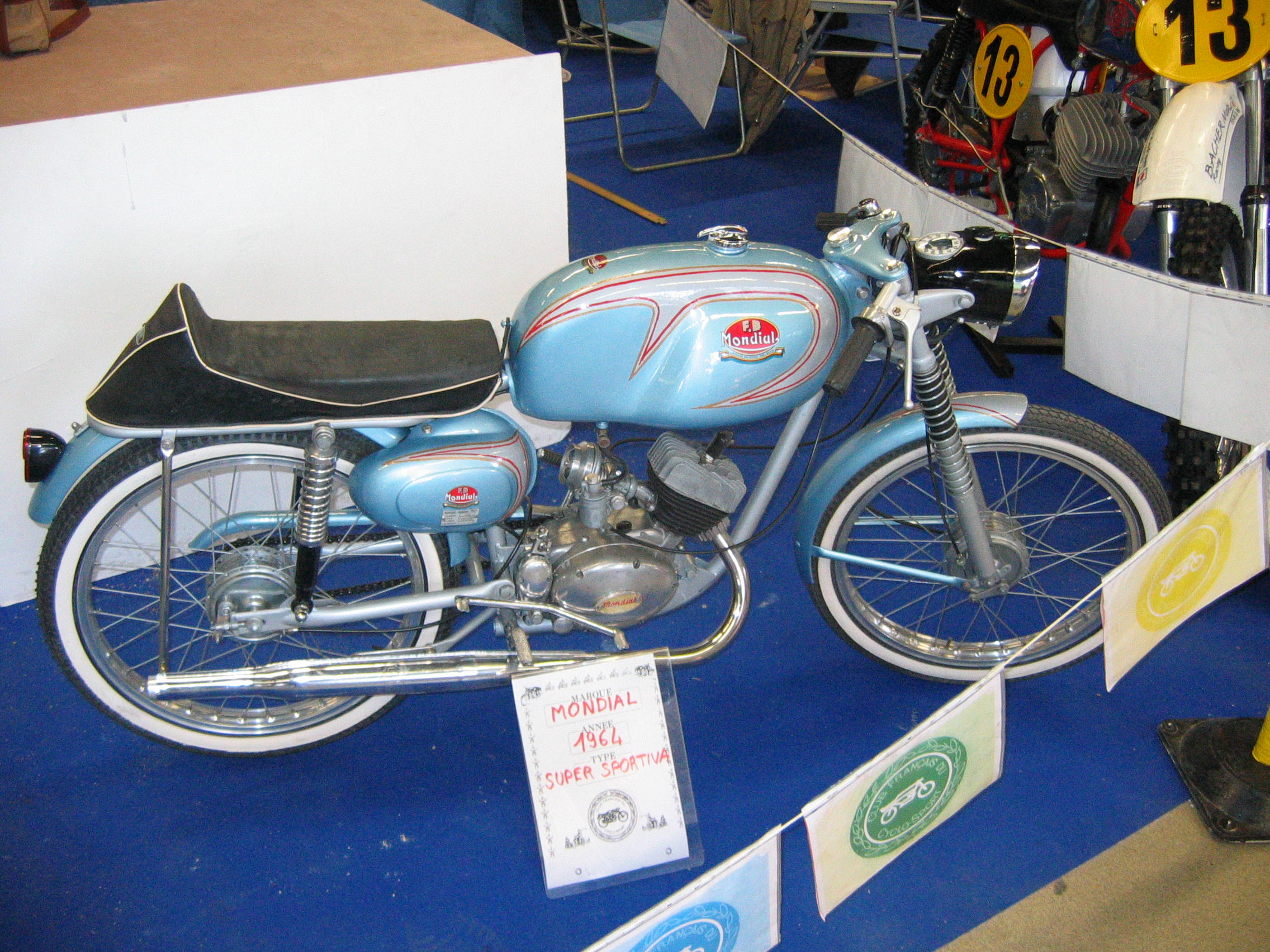
1964 50cc Mondial Super Sportiva

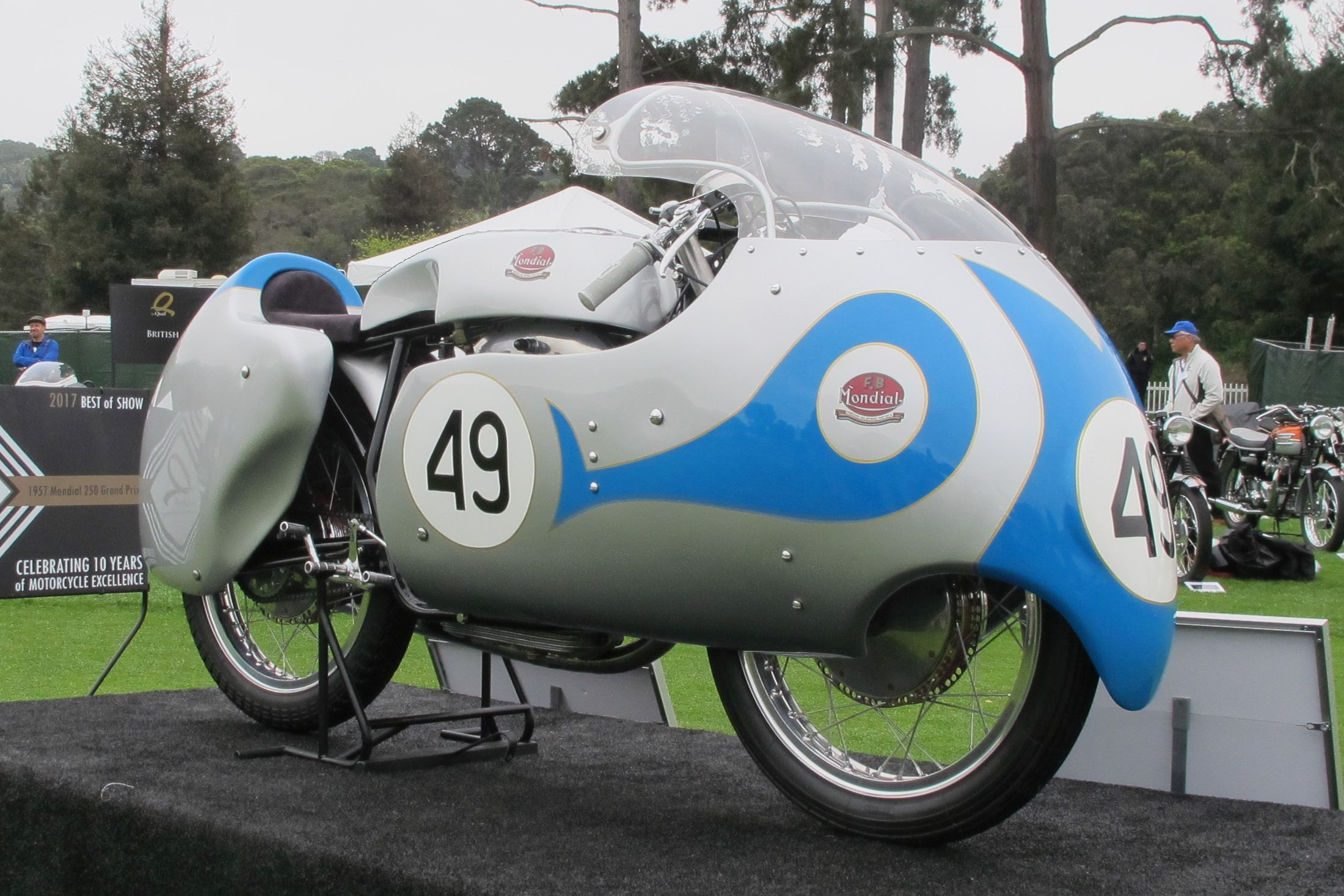
1957 Mondial 250 Grand Prix racing motorcycle

The collaboration between the Drusiani family and the Boselli family continued at the end of the war period, with the reconstruction of the building, thanks to the enormous economic resources of Boselli, who took over full control of the company. FB effectively relaunched in 1948 as FB Mondial. Mondial found early racing success, winning their first of what would become five World Championships in only their second year of production. During a time when MV Agusta and Ducati produced economy lightweight two-stroke motorcycles, mopeds and scooters, Mondial was more of a "boutique" manufacturer, specializing in high-performance, small-displacement motorcycles. Much of the production of each motorcycle was done by hand, which kept output low, with production numbers typically ranging between 1,000 and 2,000 units per year. Mondial were able to continue this success for a number of years, sticking with this methodology. In 1957, Soichiro Honda approached Mondial owner Count Boselli for purchase of a Mondial racebike, with which the firm had just won the 125 cc and 250 cc world titles. Count Boselli gave Mr. Honda a racing Mondial; Honda used this bike as a standard to which he aspired, in order to compete on a world-scale. An original Mondial 125 cc racebike is, still now, the first bike on display when entering Honda's Motegi Collection Hall.

After the 1957 Grand Prix season, many major Italian motorcycle manufacturers including Gilera, Moto Guzzi, and MV Agusta announced that they would pull out of Grand Prix competition citing increasing costs and diminishing sales (MV Agusta later reconsidered and continued racing). Mondial, despite their continued success, decide to join them. This marked the beginning of a decline in popularity and sales for the Italian company, and in 1960, the last all-Mondial motorcycle left the factory. After this, Mondial continued for a while, purchasing engines from proprietary makers. In this hybrid form, motorcycles with Mondial frames and ancillary parts, but non-Mondial engines, were produced by the factory for the next 19 years. However, Mondial stopped production in their entirety in 1979, until their rebirth nearly twenty years later.

== Ziletti ownership (1999–2004) ==
In 1999, the rights to Mondial were purchased by newspaper tycoon Roberto Ziletti. Ziletti was an avid motorcyclist in his youth, and his dream was to own a prestigious motorcycle company. Soon after purchasing the rights, Ziletti's father died, leaving him in charge of the Lastra Group. Mondial started producing superbikes again soon afterward.

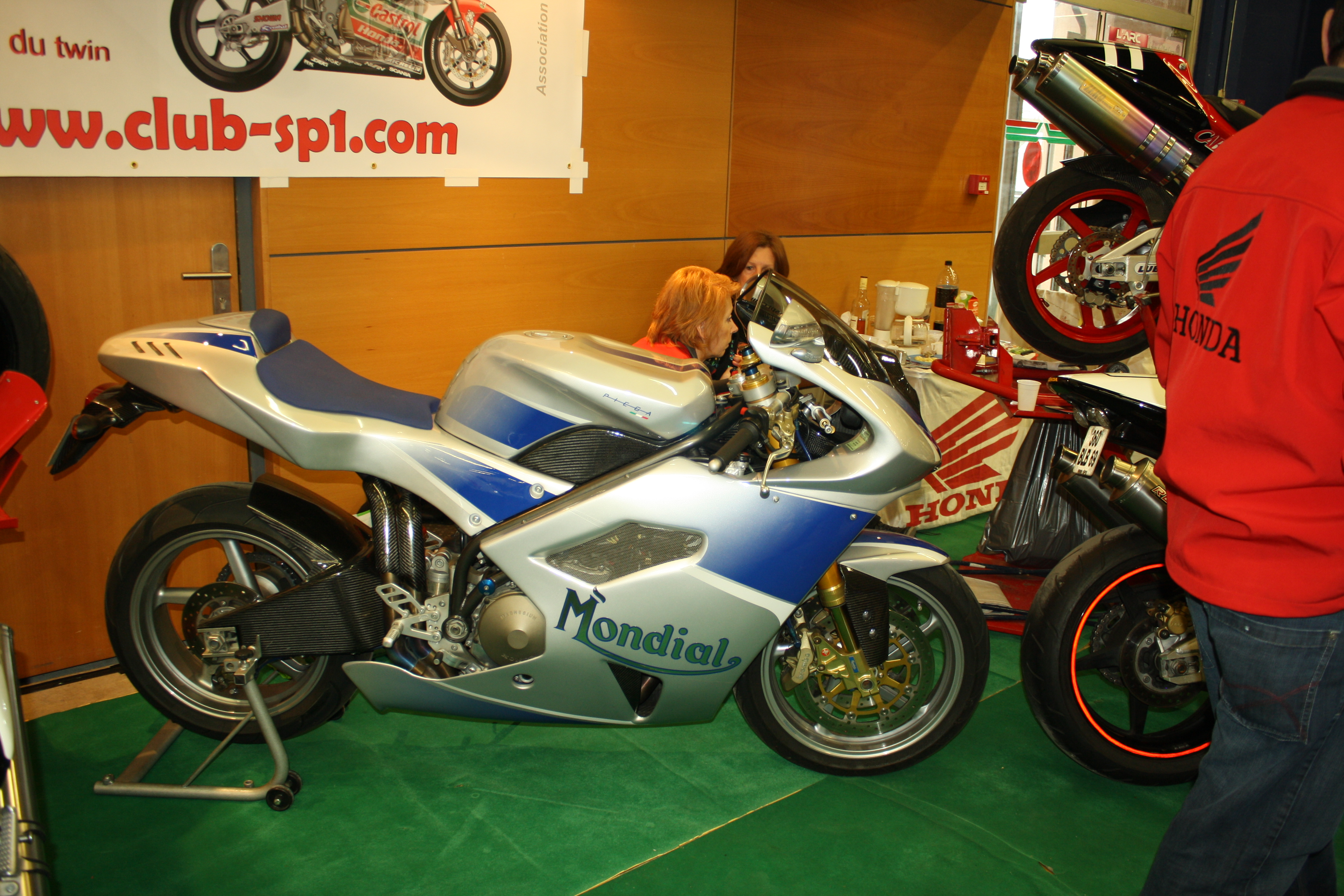
Mondial Piega

In 2000 Ziletti asked Honda to supply engines for the new Mondial (the Piega 1000) from their race-winning RC51 superbikes. A deal was supposedly made because Mondial had supplied Soichiro Honda with that 1957 racebike. This was the first time Honda has ever allowed a firm to use its engines for their production vehicles.

Mondial's difficulties occurred when Lastra acquired Mitsubishi Corp.'s worldwide graphic arts division, leaving Roberto Ziletti insufficient time to focus on Mondial. He had spent more than 11 million Euros on the company, and after failing to farm Mondial out to a Swiss company, the Arcore factory was placed in the hands of the Monza bankruptcy court in July 2004, with around 35 Mondial Piega 1000s in various states of completion. To place this in perspective, Lastra Group had a turnover exceeding 500 million Euros in 2004.

In interviews in March 2005 a south Georgia motorcycle dealership, stated that the courts had arranged to sell Mondial to their American firm, Superbike Racing, on 28 February 2005, and that they would continue the marque. However, the Monza courts sold Mondial Moto SPA to another buyer on 27 July 2005: Biemme, another motorcycle firm located in Meda (near Milan) and owned by Piero Caronni (the same man who bought from Rimini bankruptcy court the remains and the production right from Bimota for the then defunct Bimota V Due), renamed itself as GRUPPO MONDIAL S.R.L. and continues offering the Piega 1000s to the market.

== Pelpi international (2014–present) ==
In 2014, friends Count Pierluigi Boselli, owner of the Mondial brand and descendant of the original founders, and Cesare Galli, holder of Pelpi international Italy, started to lay the foundation of a project to revive the company, sketching out the first designs that would in time become the first motorcycle.

Cesare Galli was formerly the Technical Director at Fantic Motor, the successful Italian offroad brand. Galli worked there until Fantic shut down in 1996 (it has since been restarted successfully), after winning a hat-trick of World Trials Championships with his designs, as well as successive World and Italian Enduro titles. Galli took over the importation of Kawasaki dirtbikes and ATVs for Italy. In 2002 he founded Pelpi International, European distributor for Taiwanese scooter and minibike manufacturers Aeon and Over.

Through that first year and all of 2015 the initial design sketches evolved into prototypes then eventually became reality; the HPS 125 and HPS 250 for FB Mondial. The HPS design aims to be a fusion of the classic F.B. Mondial character, with modern technology.

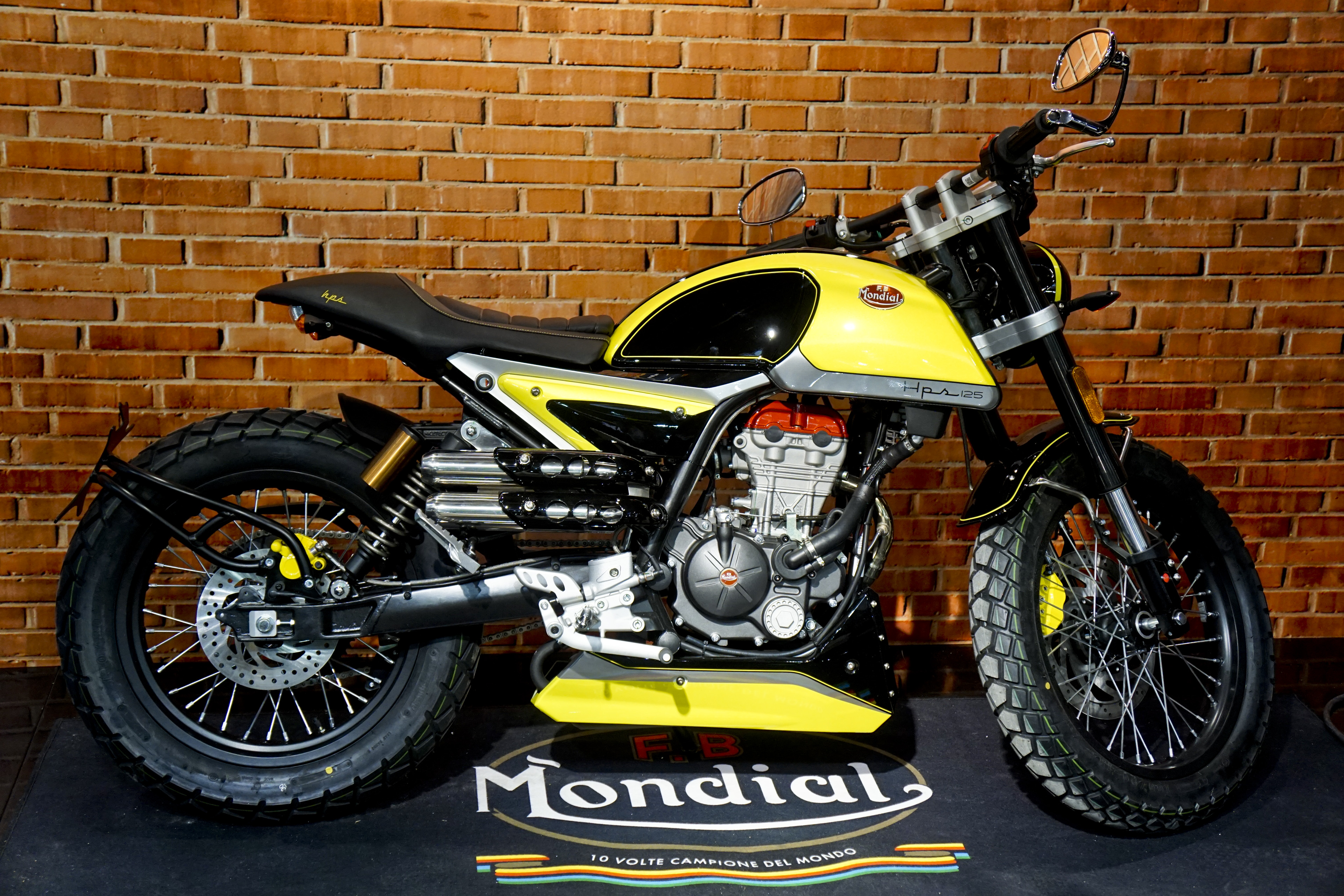
2017 FB Mondial HPS 125

Built by Zongshen-Piaggio joint venture in China, the new Mondials are effectively Piaggio engines with Mondial's own higher specification design of chassis and styling.

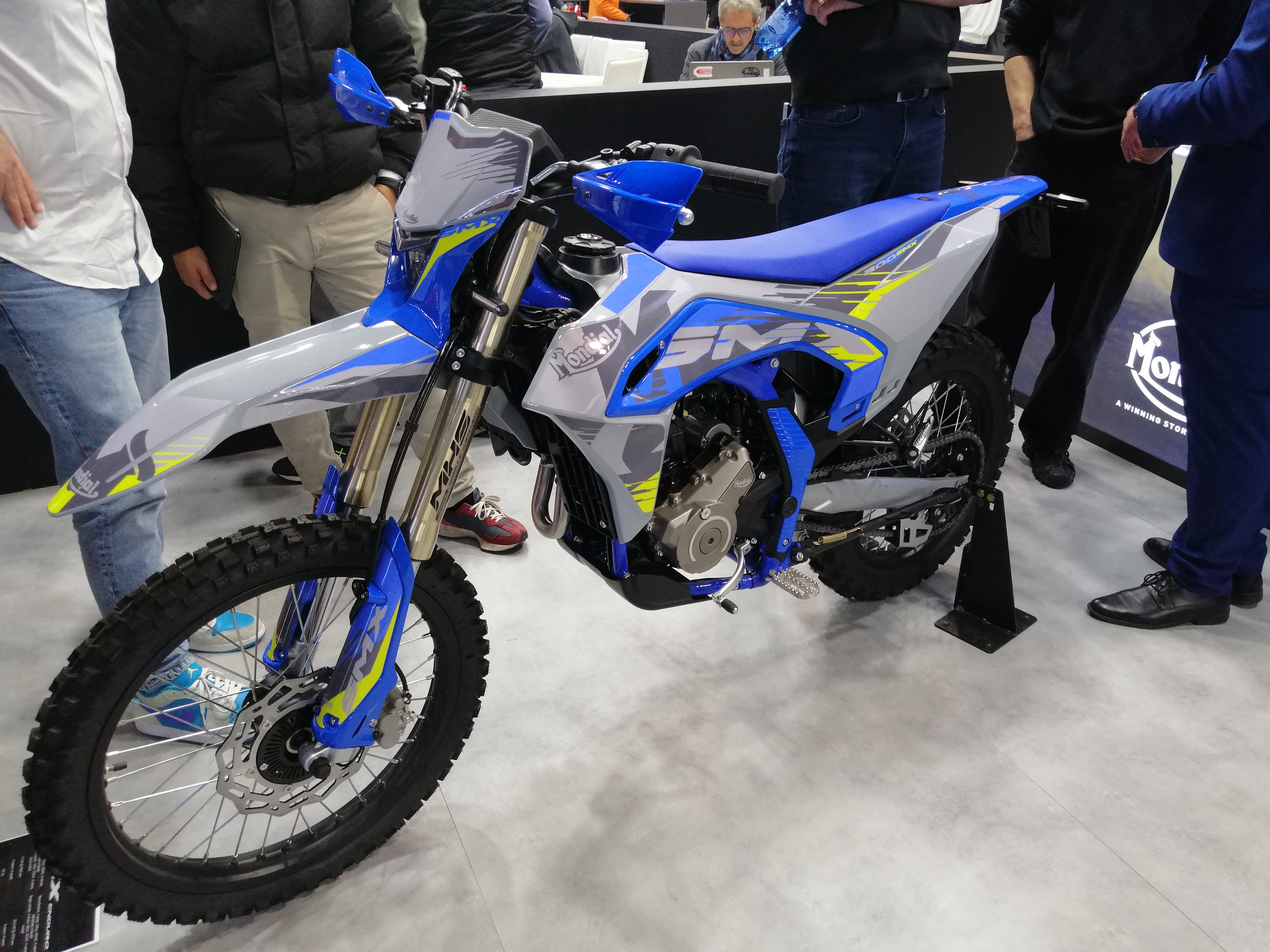
2024 FB Mondial SMX

The firm currently offers four variants to the market. The traditionally styled 'café-racer' HPS, available with a 125cc and 250cc engine, as well as the off-road, sportier styled SMT and SMX models.

== Race history ==
=== World Championship Grand Prix ===
World Championship 1949

- Riders' World Championship – 125cc Class – Nello Pagani
- Constructors' World Championship – 125cc Class

World Championship 1950

- Riders' World Championship – 125cc Class – Bruno Ruffo
- Constructors' World Championship – 125cc Class

World Championship 1951

- Riders' World Championship – 125cc Class – Carlo Ubbiali
- Constructors' World Championship – 125cc Class

World Championship 1957

- Riders' World Championship – 250cc Class – Cecil Sandford
- Riders' World Championship – 125cc Class – Tarquinio Provini
- Constructors' World Championship – 250cc Class
- Constructors' World Championship – 125cc Class

After the 1957 Grand Prix season, the major Italian motorcycle manufacturers including Gilera, Moto Guzzi, MV Agusta and Mondial announced that they would pull out of Grand Prix competition citing increasing costs and diminishing sales.

=== National championships ===
- 1950 Italian Leaders Championship – 1st Division – Class 125 – Carlo Ubbiali
- 1950 Italian Leaders Championship – 1st Division – International Industry Trophy
- 1951 Italian Leaders Championship – 1st Division – Class 125 – Carlo Ubbiali
- 1952 Italian Leaders Championship – 1st Division – Class 125 – Carlo Ubbiali
- 1952 Austrian Speed Championship – Class 125 – Alexander Mayer
- 1952 Italian Leadership Championship – 2nd Division – Class 125 – Adelio Albonico
- 1953 Austrian Speed Championship – Class 125 – Alexander Mayer
- 1953 Dutch Speed Championship – Class 125 – Lodewick Simons
- 1953 Italian Leadership Championships – 2nd Class – Class 125 – Venturi Remo
- 1954 Dutch Speed Championship – Class 125 – Lodewick Simons
- 1954 Italian Leaders Championships – 2nd Class – Class 125 – Tarquinio Provini
- 1954 Italian Marche Championship – 2nd Division – Class 125
- 1955 Italian Leaders Championships – 1st Class – Class 125 – Tarquinio Provini
- 1956 Italian Motocross Championship – Emilio Ostorero
- 1957 Italian Motocross Championship – Emilio Ostorero
- 1957 Italian Championships Formula 1 – Class 250
- 1957 Italian Championships Formula 1 – Class 125
- 1957 English Marche Championships – Class 250 English Marche Championships – Class 125
- 1965 French Speed Championship – Class 125 – Jacky Onda

=== Isle of Man Tourist Trophy ===
1951 Isle of Man TT

- Ultra Lightweight TT (125cc) – Cromie McCandless

1957 Isle of Man TT

- Ultra Lightweight TT (125cc) – Tarquinio Provini
- Lightweight TT (250cc) – Cecil Sandford

== Models ==
Naked

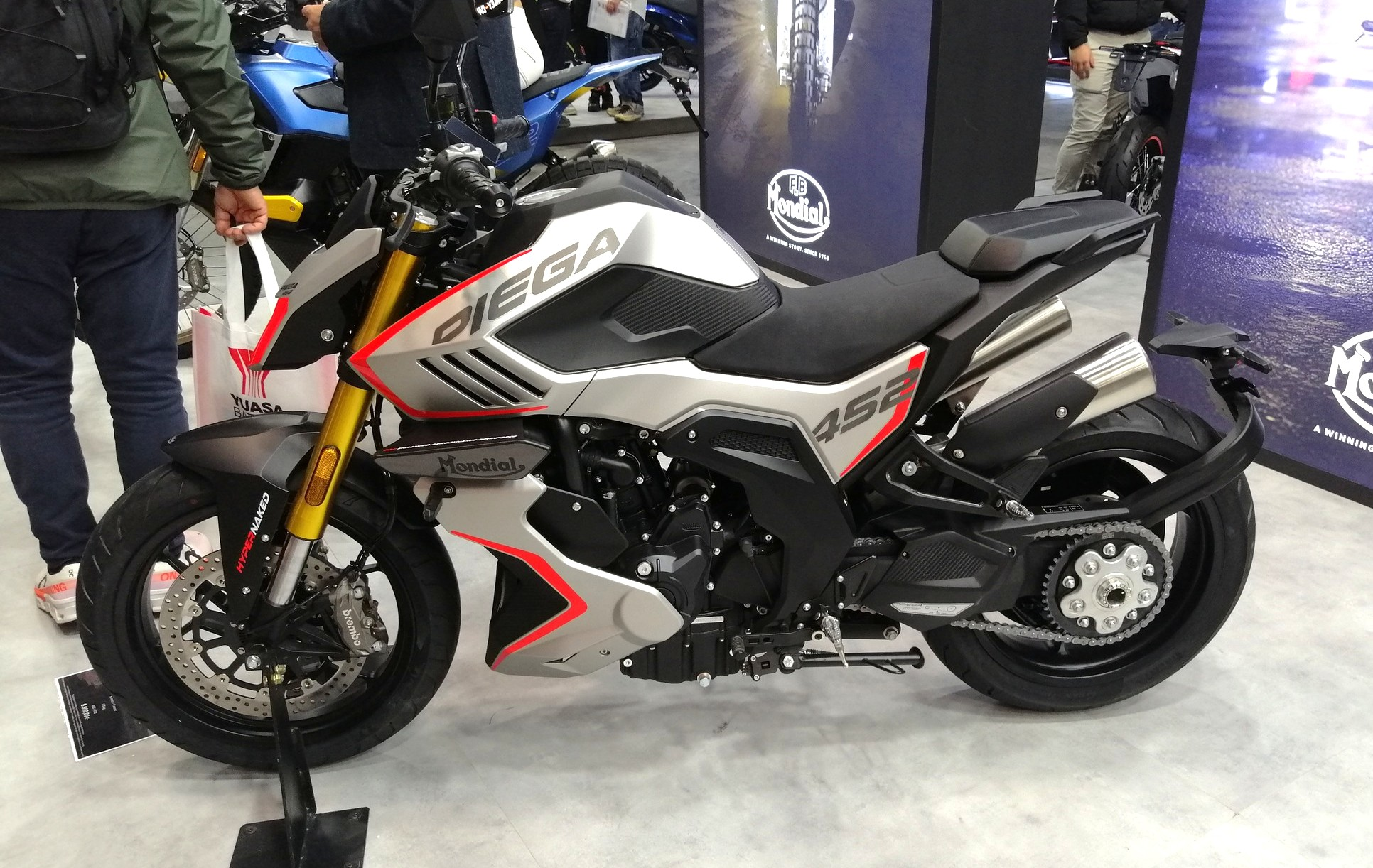
2026 FB Mondial Piega 452

- Mondial Piega 125
- Mondial Piega 452
- Mondial Flex 125
- Mondial Flex 300

Sport

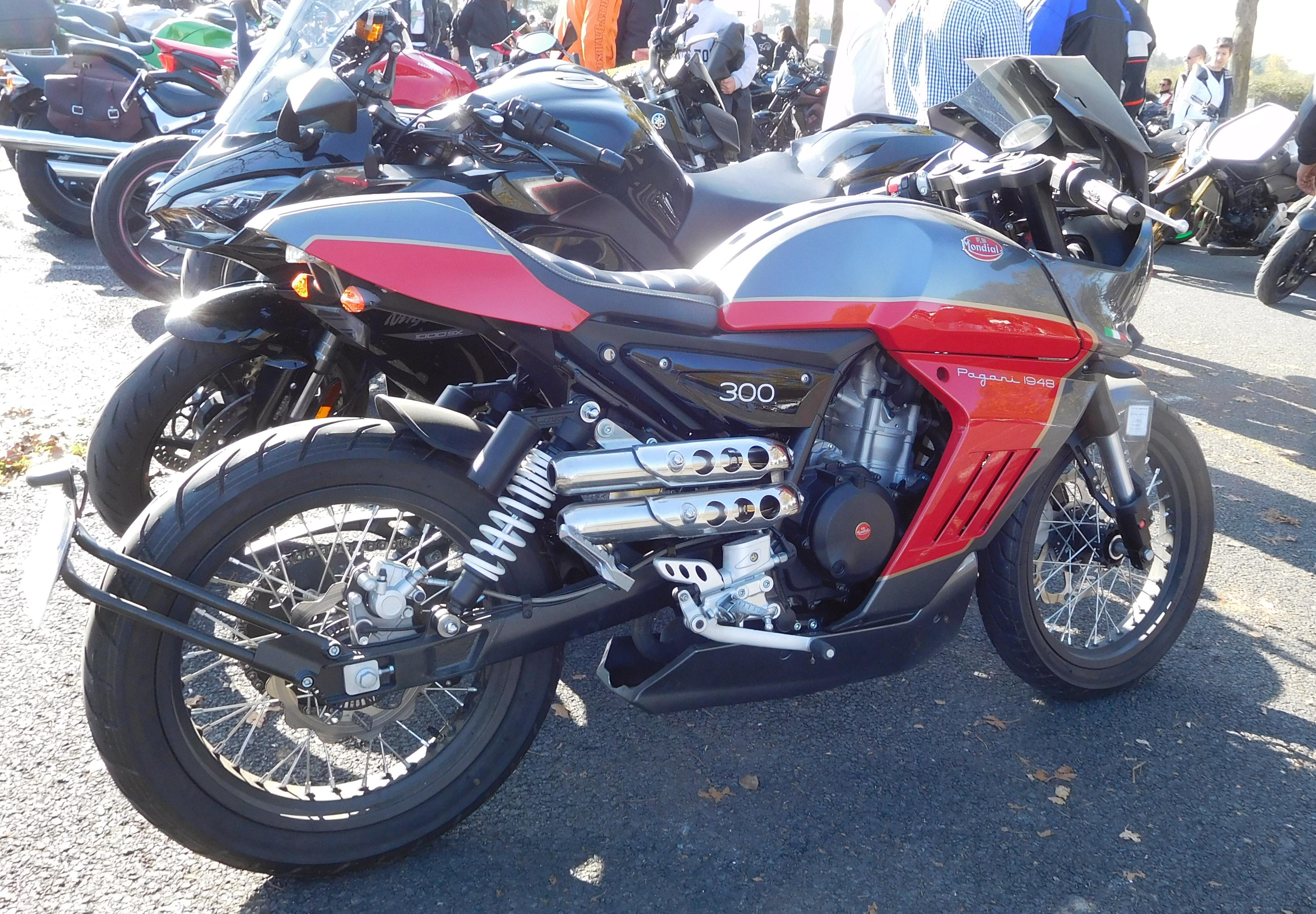
2026 FB Mondial Sport Classic 300

- Mondial Pagani Sport Classic 125
- Mondial Pagani Sport Classic 300

Cruiser

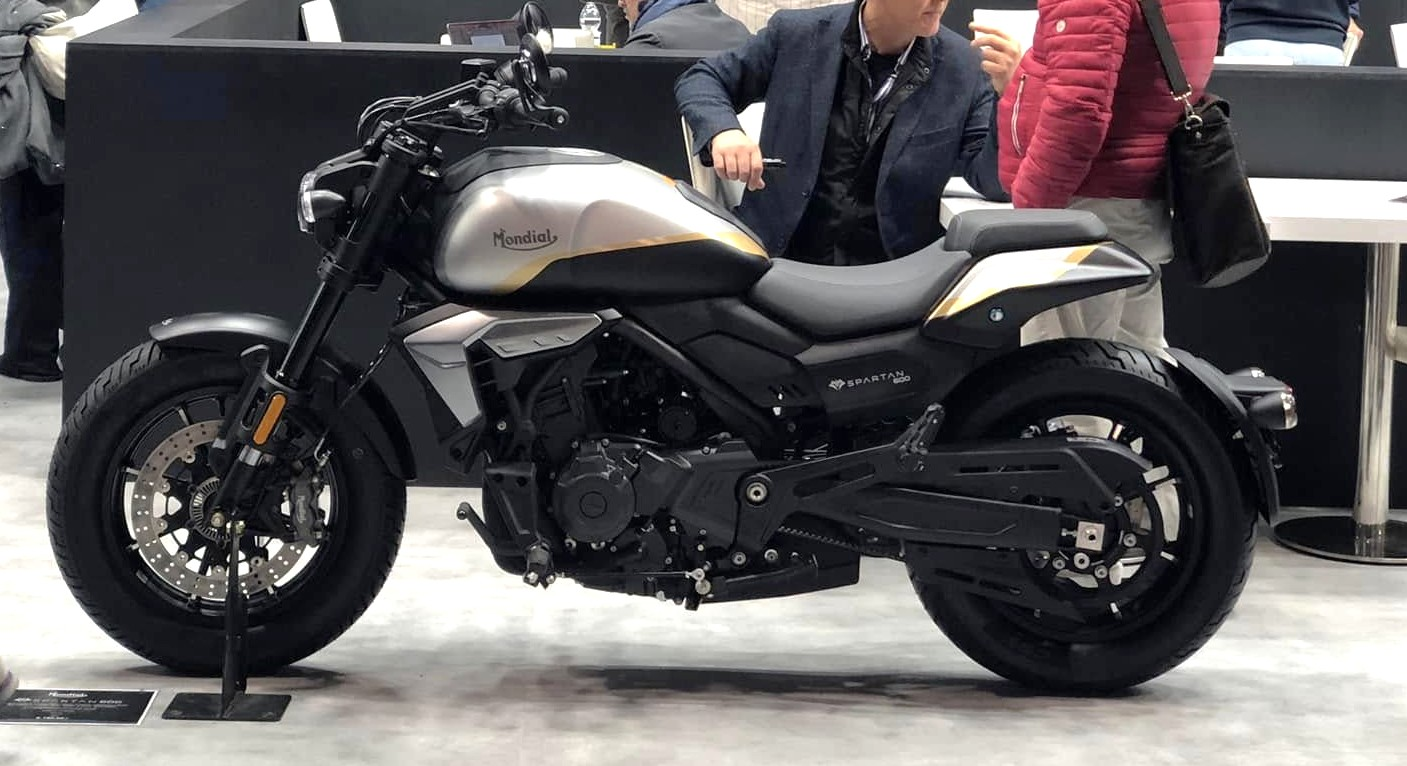
2026 FB Mondial Spartan 600

- Mondial Spartan 125
- Mondial Spartan 250
- Mondial Spartan 600

Scrambler

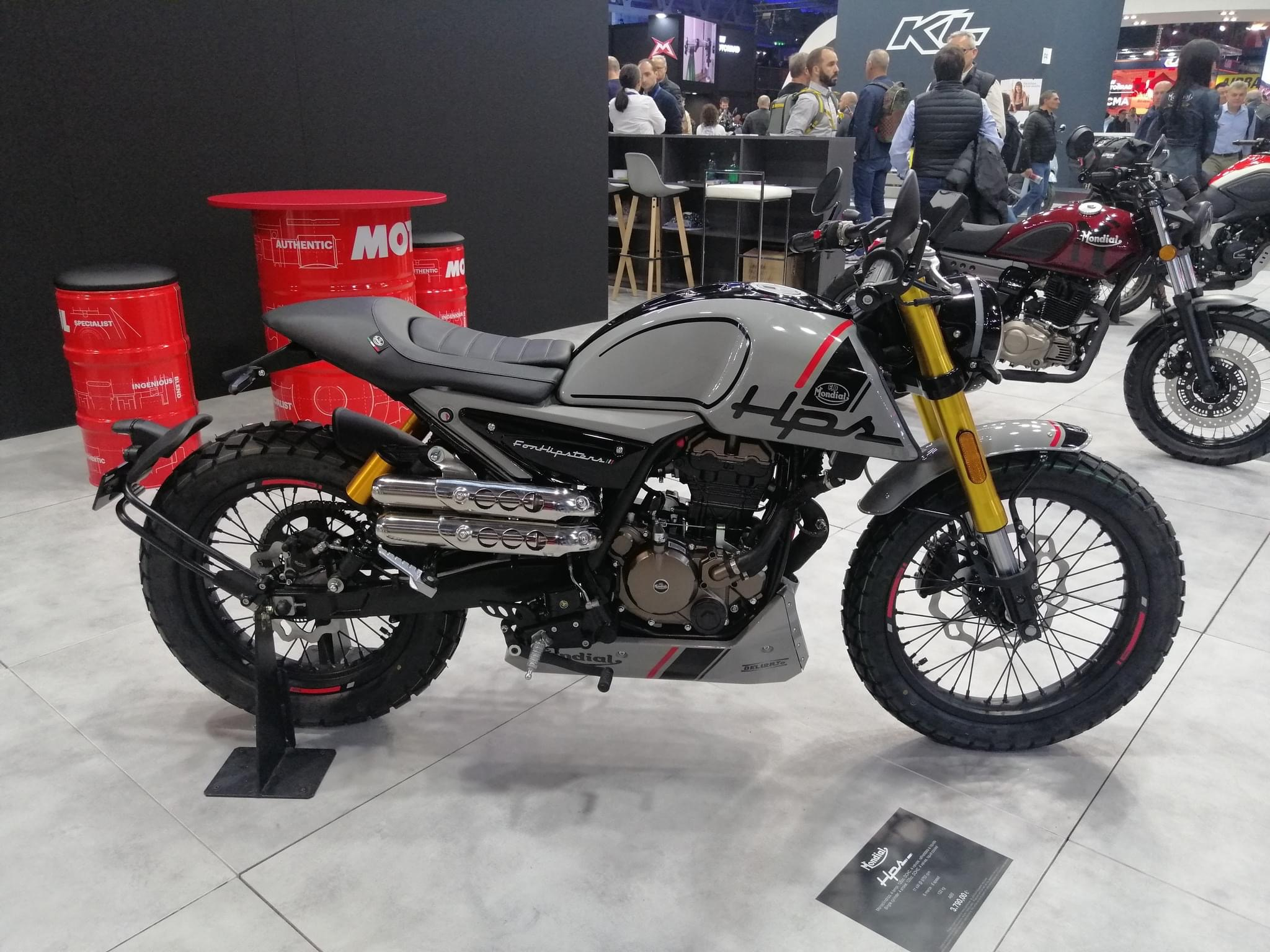
2026 FB Mondial HPS 300

- Mondial HPS 125
- Mondial HPS 300

Flat Track

2026 FB Mondial Flat 125

- Mondial Flat 125
- Mondial Flat 300

Motard/Enduro

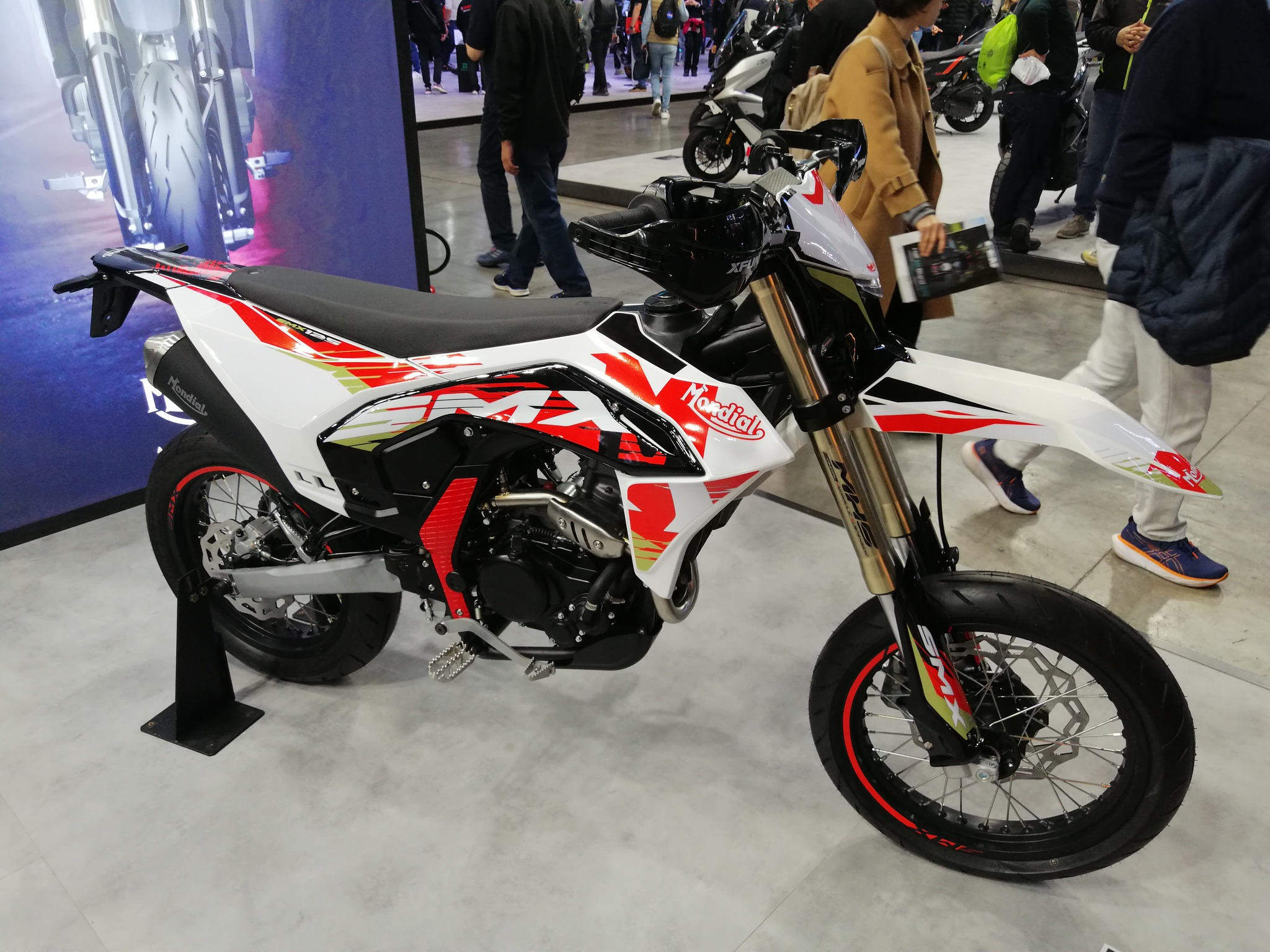
2026 FB Mondial SMX 125

- Mondial SMX 125
- Mondial SMX 300

Dual-Sport

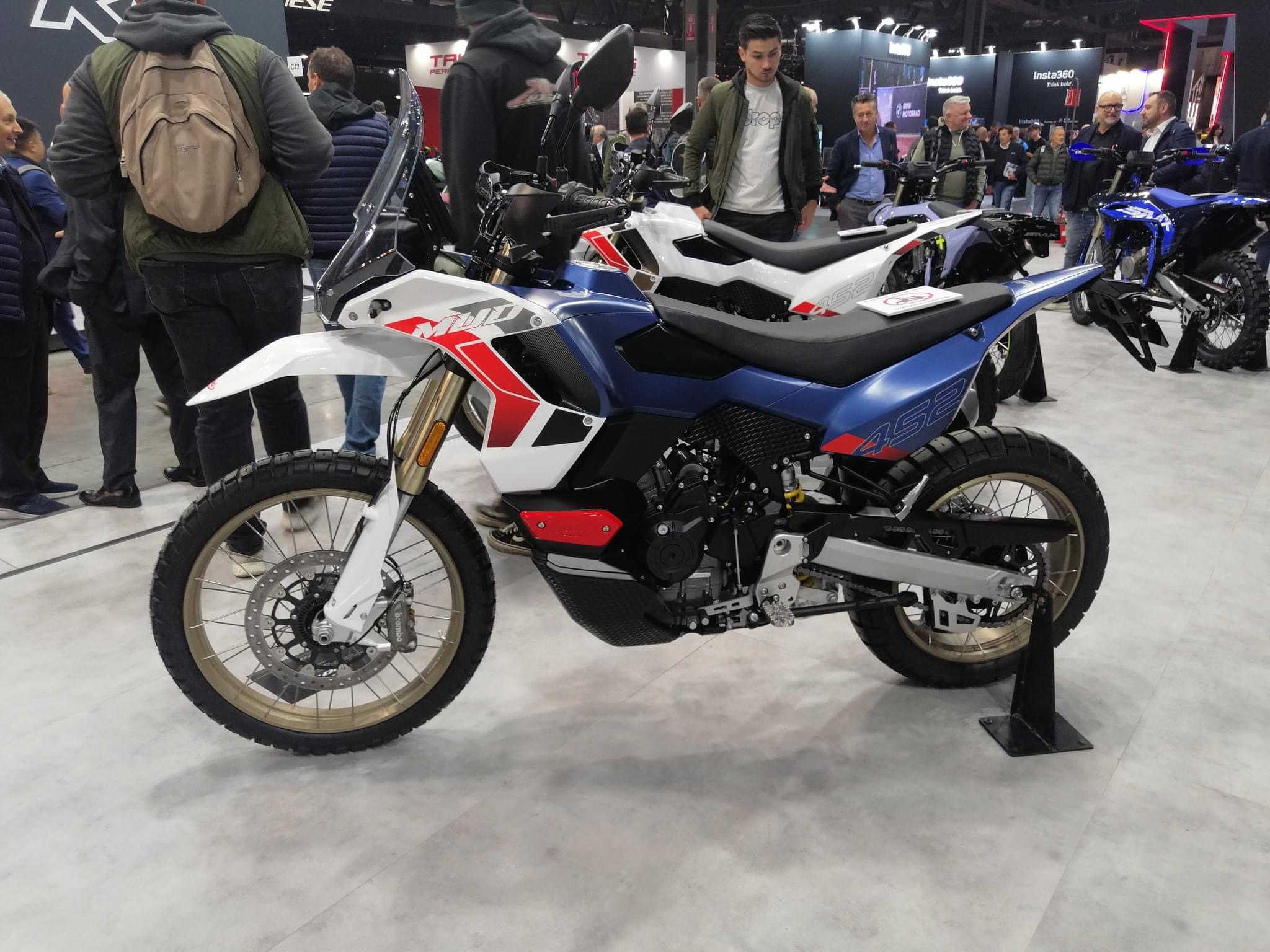
2026 FB Mondial Mud 452

- Mondial Mud 452

Scooter

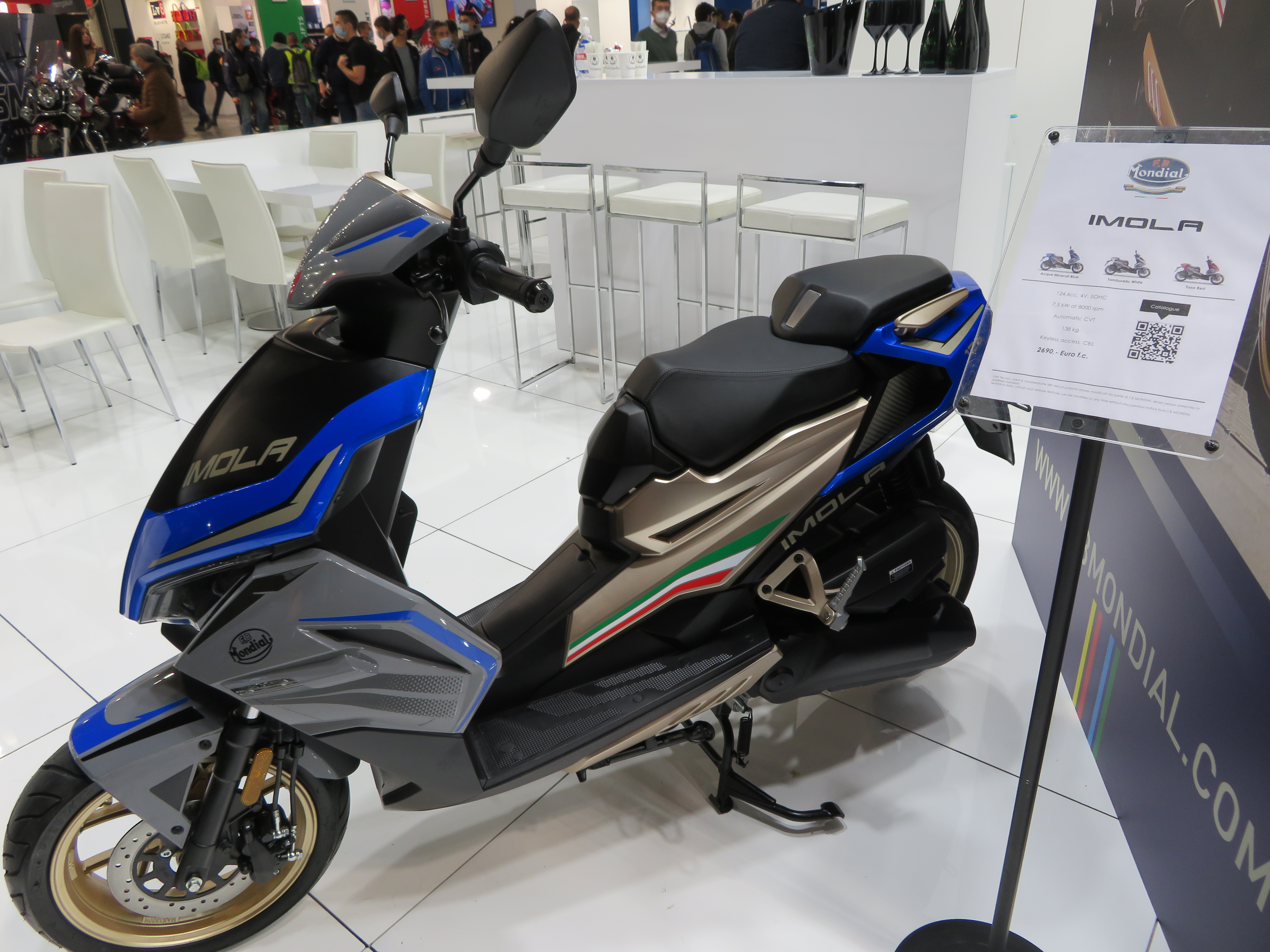
2026 FB Mondial Imola 125

- Mondial Imola 50
- Mondial Imola 125

== See also ==
- List of Italian companies
- List of motorcycle manufacturers
