= List of 125cc/Moto3 World Riders' Champions =

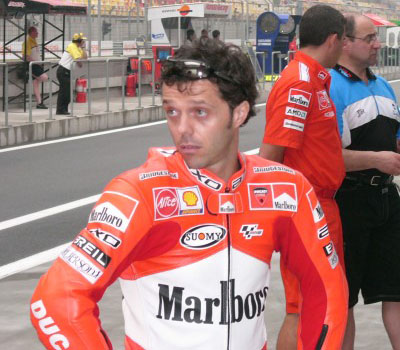
Loris Capirossi, the youngest 125cc champion

Grand Prix motorcycle racing is the premier championship of motorcycle road racing, which has been divided into three classes: MotoGP, Moto2, and Moto3. Former classes that have been discontinued include 350cc, 250cc, 125cc, 50cc/80cc, MotoE, and Sidecar. The Grand Prix Road-Racing World Championship was established in 1949 by the sport's governing body, the Fédération Internationale de Motocyclisme (FIM), and is the oldest motorsport world championship in existence. Moto3 replaced the 125cc class in 2012; the 125cc referred to the size of the engines of the motorcycles that participated in the class. It is the entry-level class where young riders begin their Grand Prix motorcycle racing careers. The minimum age for a rider is 16 years, and the maximum is 28 years. However, after a rash of incidents involving young rider fatalities in lower classes, the FIM set a minimum age of 18 starting in the 2023 season.

Points earned in these events count toward the riders' and constructors' world championships. These two are separate championships, but are based on the same point system. The number of points awarded at the end of each race to the top 15 qualifying riders depends on their placement. Points received by each finisher, from first 1st place to 15th place: 25, 20, 16, 13, 11, 10, 9, 8, 7, 6, 5, 4, 3, 2, 1. Historically, there have been several points systems. Results from all current Grands Prix count towards the championships; in the past, only a certain number of results were counted.

Ángel Nieto has won the most championships, with seven. Loris Capirossi is the youngest rider to win the championship; he was 17 years and 165 days old when he won in 1990. Spanish riders have won the most championships; 19 riders have won a total of 25 championships. Italian riders have won the second-most championships; 15 riders have won a total of 24 championships. Riders from the United Kingdom have won the third-most championships; five riders have won a total of five championships. Rupert Hollaus' 1954 title was the only time a posthumous World Champion was crowned in any class in Grand Prix motorcycle racing. He was killed during practice for the Italian Grand Prix before the end of the 1954 season. Emilio Alzamora was the second rider in history to win a Grand Prix motorcycle world championship without having won a race in 1999 after Manuel Herreros. Nello Pagani won the inaugural championship in 1949. Nicolas Terol was the last rider to win the 125cc championship in 2011. Sandro Cortese was the first rider to win the Moto3 championship in 2012. Máximo Quiles is the current champion; he won the 2026 Moto3 World Championship.

== Champions ==
Key
‡	Champion also won the 250cc Championship in that season
†	Champion also won the 80cc Championship in that season
*	Champion also won the 50cc Championship in that season
—	Indicates information is not available

- The "Season" column refers to the season the competition was held, and wikilinks to the article about that season.
- The "Margin" column refers to the margin of points by which the winner defeated the runner-up.

=== By season ===
125cc/Moto3 World Riders' Champions by season
Season	Country	Rider	Constructor	Grands Prix	Poles	Wins	Podiums	Fastest laps	Points	Clinched	# of rounds remaining	Margin
1949	Italy	Nello Pagani	Mondial	3	—	2	2	2	27	Round 3 of 3	0	13
1950	Italy	Bruno Ruffo	Mondial	3	—	1	2	1	17	Round 3 of 3	0	3
1951	Italy	Carlo Ubbiali	Mondial	4 (Note: Ubbiali missed one race of the season.)	—	1	3	2	20	Round 4 of 4	0	8
1952	United Kingdom	Cecil Sandford	MV Agusta	6 (Note: Sandford missed one race of the season.)	—	3	5	3	28	Round 5 of 6	1	4
1953	West Germany	Werner Haas^{‡}	NSU	6 (Note: Haas missed one race of the season.)	—	3	5	4	30	Round 5 of 6	1	10
1954	Austria	Rupert Hollaus	NSU	6 (Note: Hollaus missed two races of the season.)	—	4	4	3	32	Round 4 of 6	2	14
1955	Italy	Carlo Ubbiali	MV Agusta	6	—	5	6	3	32	Round 5 of 6	1	6
1956	Italy	Carlo Ubbiali^{‡}	MV Agusta	6	—	5	6	3	32	Round 4 of 6	2	18
1957	Italy	Tarquinio Provini	Mondial	6 (Note: Provini missed one race of the season.)	—	3	5	5	30	Round 5 of 6	1	8
1958	Italy	Carlo Ubbiali	MV Agusta	7 (Note: Ubbiali missed one race of the season.)	—	4	5	2	32	Round 6 of 7	1	7
1959	Italy	Carlo Ubbiali^{‡}	MV Agusta	7 (Note: Ubbiali missed one race of the season.)	—	3	5	4	30	Round 7 of 7	0	2
1960	Italy	Carlo Ubbiali^{‡}	MV Agusta	5	—	4	5	2	24	Round 4 of 5	1	6
1961	Australia	Tom Phillis	Honda	11	—	4	8	6	44	Round 11 of 11	0	2
1962	Switzerland	Luigi Taveri	Honda	11 (Note: Taveri missed one race of the season.)	—	6	9	7	48	Round 8 of 11	3	10
1963	New Zealand	Hugh Anderson*	Suzuki	12 (Note: Anderson missed three races of the season.)	—	6	8	4	54	Round 8 of 12	4	16
1964	Switzerland	Luigi Taveri	Honda	11 (Note: Taveri missed two races of the season.)	—	5	9	3	46	Round 9 of 11	2	10
1965	New Zealand	Hugh Anderson	Suzuki	12 (Note: Anderson missed two races of the season.)	—	7	8	8	56	Round 11 of 12	1	12
1966	Switzerland	Luigi Taveri	Honda	10 (Note: Taveri missed one race of the season.)	—	5	8	5	46	Round 9 of 10	1	6
1967	United Kingdom	Bill Ivy	Yamaha	12	—	8	10	10	56	Round 10 of 12	2	16
1968	United Kingdom	Phil Read^{‡}	Yamaha	9 (Note: Read missed one race of the season.)	—	6	8	2	40	Round 6 of 9	3	6
1969	United Kingdom	Dave Simmonds	Kawasaki	11 (Note: Simmonds missed one race of the season.)	—	8	10	6	90	Round 7 of 11	4	31
1970	West Germany	Dieter Braun	Suzuki	11 (Note: Braun missed four races in of the season.)	—	4	6	0	84	Round 9 of 11	2	12
1971	Spain	Ángel Nieto	Derbi	11 (Note: Nieto missed five races of the season.)	—	5	6	6	87	Round 11 of 11	0	8
1972	Spain	Ángel Nieto*	Derbi	13 (Note: Nieto missed six races of the season.)	—	5	7	5	97	Round 13 of 13	0	10
1973	Sweden	Kent Andersson	Yamaha	12 (Note: Andersson missed five races of the season.)	—	5	7	3	99	Round 10 of 12	2	24
1974	Sweden	Kent Andersson	Yamaha	10 (Note: Andersson missed one race of the season.)	3	5	8	2	87	Round 8 of 10	2	24
1975	Italy	Paolo Pileri	Morbidelli	10	3	7	8	4	90	Round 6 of 10	4	18
1976	Italy	Pier Paolo Bianchi	Morbidelli	9 (Note: Bianchi missed two races of the season.)	6	7	7	6	90	Round 8 of 9	1	23
1977	Italy	Pier Paolo Bianchi	Morbidelli	12 (Note: Bianchi missed two races of the season.)	8	7	9	6	131	Round 10 of 12	2	26
1978	Italy	Eugenio Lazzarini	MBA	12 (Note: Lazzarini missed two races of the season.)	5	4	8	4	114	Round 10 of 12	2	26
1979	Spain	Ángel Nieto	Minarelli	13 (Note: Nieto missed five races of the season.)	5	8	8	6	120	Round 10 of 13	3	67
1980	Italy	Pier Paolo Bianchi	MBA	10 (Note: Bianchi missed one race of the season.)	3	2	5	1	90	Round 9 of 10	1	9
1981	Spain	Ángel Nieto	Minarelli	12 (Note: Nieto missed one race of the season.)	3	8	9	5	140	Round 10 of 12	2	45
1982	Spain	Ángel Nieto	Garelli	12 (Note: Nieto missed three races of the season.)	2	6	7	2	111	Round 10 of 12	2	16
1983	Spain	Ángel Nieto	Garelli	11 (Note: Nieto missed one race of the season.)	1	6	7	6	102	Round 9 of 11	2	26
1984	Spain	Ángel Nieto	Garelli	8 (Note: Nieto missed one race of the season.)	0	6	6	6	90	Round 6 of 8	2	12
1985	Italy	Fausto Gresini	Garelli	10	5	3	8	1	109	Round 10 of 10	0	10
1986	Italy	Luca Cadalora	Garelli	11	5	4	8	4	122	Round 11 of 11	0	8
1987	Italy	Fausto Gresini	Garelli	11	6	10	10	7	150	Round 9 of 11	2	62
1988	Spain	Jorge Martínez^{†}	Derbi	11	6	9	10	6	197	Round 10 of 11	1	29
1989	Spain	Àlex Crivillé	JJ Cobas	12 (Note: Crivillé missed one race of the season.)	3	5	9	4	166	Round 12 of 12	0	14
1990	Italy	Loris Capirossi	Honda	14	0	3	8	0	182	Round 14 of 14	0	9
1991	Italy	Loris Capirossi	Honda	13	5	5	12	4	200	Round 12 of 13	1	19
1992	Italy	Alessandro Gramigni	Aprilia	13 (Note: Gramigni missed one race of the season.)	3	2	7	0	134	Round 13 of 13	0	16
1993	Germany	Dirk Raudies	Honda	14	6	9	11	3	280	Round 14 of 14	0	14
1994	Japan	Kazuto Sakata	Aprilia	14	7	4	8	4	224	Round 13 of 14	1	30
1995	Japan	Haruchika Aoki	Honda	13	3	7	9	2	224	Round 11 of 13	2	84
1996	Japan	Haruchika Aoki	Honda	15	3	2	9	3	220	Round 15 of 15	0	27
1997	Italy	Valentino Rossi	Aprilia	15	4	11	13	7	321	Round 12 of 15	3	83
1998	Japan	Kazuto Sakata	Aprilia	14	4	4	6	2	229	Round 13 of 14	1	12
1999	Spain	Emilio Alzamora	Honda	16	0	0	10	3	227	Round 16 of 16	0	1
2000	Italy	Roberto Locatelli	Aprilia	16	9	5	8	5	230	Round 15 of 16	1	13
2001	San Marino	Manuel Poggiali	Gilera	16	2	3	11	0	241	Round 16 of 16	0	9
2002	France	Arnaud Vincent	Aprilia	16	2	5	10	0	273	Round 16 of 16	0	19
2003	Spain	Dani Pedrosa	Honda	16 (Note: Pedrosa missed two races of the season.)	3	5	6	3	223	Round 14 of 16	2	57
2004	Italy	Andrea Dovizioso	Honda	16	8	5	11	3	293	Round 14 of 16	2	91
2005	Switzerland	Thomas Lüthi	Honda	16	5	4	8	1	242	Round 16 of 16	0	5
2006	Spain	Álvaro Bautista	Aprilia	16	8	8	14	7	338	Round 13 of 16	3	76
2007	Hungary	Gábor Talmácsi	Aprilia	17	5	3	10	6	282	Round 17 of 17	0	5
2008	France	Mike Di Meglio	Derbi	17	2	4	9	4	264	Round 15 of 17	2	39
2009	Spain	Julián Simón	Aprilia	16	7	7	12	7	289	Round 14 of 16	2	65.5
2010	Spain	Marc Márquez	Derbi	17	12	10	12	7	310	Round 17 of 17	0	14
2011	Spain	Nicolás Terol	Aprilia	17 (Note: Terol missed one race of the season.)	7	8	11	4	302	Round 17 of 17	0	40
2012	Germany	Sandro Cortese	KTM	17	7	5	15	4	325	Round 15 of 17	2	111
2013	Spain	Maverick Viñales	KTM	17	2	3	15	3	323	Round 17 of 17	0	12
2014	Spain	Álex Márquez	Honda	18	3	3	10	3	278	Round 18 of 18	0	2
2015	United Kingdom	Danny Kent	Honda	18	5	6	9	3	260	Round 18 of 18	0	6
2016	South Africa	Brad Binder	KTM	18	6	7	14	3	319	Round 14 of 18	4	142
2017	Spain	Joan Mir	Honda	18	1	10	13	3	341	Round 16 of 18	2	93
2018	Spain	Jorge Martín	Honda	18 (Note: Martín missed one race of the season.)	11	7	10	3	260	Round 17 of 18	1	42
2019	Italy	Lorenzo Dalla Porta	Honda	19	1	4	11	1	279	Round 17 of 19	2	79
2020	Spain	Albert Arenas	KTM	15	0	3	5	1	174	Round 15 of 15	0	4
2021	Spain	Pedro Acosta	KTM	18	1	6	8	1	259	Round 17 of 18	1	43
2022	Spain	Izan Guevara	GasGas	20	5	7	12	2	319	Round 18 of 20	2	62
2023	Spain	Jaume Masià	Honda	20	6	4	10	1	274	Round 19 of 20	1	6
2024	Colombia	David Alonso	CFMoto	20	7	14	15	3	421	Round 16 of 20	4	165
2025	Spain	José Antonio Rueda	KTM	22 (Note: Rueda missed three races of the season.)	5	10	14	4	365	Round 18 of 22	4	84
2026	Spain	Máximo Quiles	KTM	20* (Note: Quiles missed one race of the season.)	4*	12*	18*	3*	417*	Round 17 of 21	4	151*

* Season still in progress

=== Multiple champions ===
125cc/Moto3 multiple champions
Rider	Total	Seasons
(Spain) Ángel Nieto	7	1971, 1972, 1979, 1981, 1982, 1983, 1984
(Italy) Carlo Ubbiali	6	1951, 1955, 1956, 1958, 1959, 1960
(Switzerland) Luigi Taveri	3	1962, 1964, 1966
(Italy) Pier Paolo Bianchi	3	1976, 1977, 1980
(New Zealand) Hugh Anderson	2	1963, 1965
(Sweden) Kent Andersson	2	1973, 1974
(Italy) Fausto Gresini	2	1985, 1987
(Italy) Loris Capirossi	2	1990, 1991
(Japan) Haruchika Aoki	2	1995, 1996
(Japan) Kazuto Sakata	2	1994, 1998

=== By constructor ===
125cc/Moto3 World Riders' Champions by constructor
Constructor	Total
(Japan) Honda	19
(Italy) Aprilia	10
(Austria) KTM	7
(Italy) MV Agusta	6
(Italy) Garelli	6
(Spain) Derbi	5
(Italy) Mondial	4
(Japan) Yamaha	4
(Japan) Suzuki	3
(Italy) Morbidelli	3
(Germany) NSU	2
(Italy) MBA	2
(Italy) Minarelli	2
(Japan) Kawasaki	1
(Spain) JJ Cobas	1
(Italy) Gilera	1
(Spain) GasGas	1
(China) CFMoto	1

=== By nationality ===
125cc/Moto3 World Riders' Champions by nationality
Country	Riders	Total
Spain	19	25
Italy	15	24
United Kingdom	5	5
Japan	2	4
Switzerland	2	4
Germany	4	4
New Zealand	1	2
Sweden	1	2
France	2	2
Austria	1	1
Australia	1	1
San Marino	1	1
Hungary	1	1
South Africa	1	1
Colombia	1	1
