= Jiří Koštíř =

Czech motorcycle racer

- Nationality: Czechoslovak
Motorcycle racing career statistics
Grand Prix motorcycle racing
| Active years | 1956–1957, 1959 |
| First race | 1956 250cc Dutch TT |
| Last race | 1959 250cc Belgian Grand Prix |
| Team | ČZ |
Starts / Wins / Podiums / Poles / F. laps / Points; 5 / 0 / 0 / N/A / N/A / 1

Jiří Koštíř (1928 – 19 June 1960) was a Czech Grand Prix motorcycle road racer.

Koštíř was a factory ČZ rider for most of his career. He died after an accident at the Znojmo street circuit in 1960.

== Motorcycle Grand Prix results ==
| Position | 1 | 2 | 3 | 4 | 5 | 6 |
| Points | 8 | 6 | 4 | 3 | 2 | 1 |

(key) (Races in italics indicate fastest lap)

| Year | Class | Team | 1 | 2 | 3 | 4 | 5 | 6 | 7 | Points | Rank | Wins |
|---|---|---|---|---|---|---|---|---|---|---|---|---|
| 1956 | 250cc | ČZ | IOM | NED; 6 | BEL | GER | ULS | NAT | | 1 | 17th | 0 |
| 1957 | 250cc | ČZ | GER | IOM; 7 | NED; Ret | BEL; 11 | ULS | NAT | | 0 | - | 0 |
| 1959 | 250cc | ČZ | IOM | GER | NED; 12 | BEL | SWE | ULS | NAT | 0 | - | 0 |
