= Bob McIntyre (motorcyclist) =

British motorcycle racer

- Nationality: Scottish
- Born: 28 November 1928; Glasgow, Scotland
- Died: 15 August 1962 (aged 33); Chester, England
Motorcycle racing career statistics
Grand Prix motorcycle racing
Active years	1953 – 1962
First race	1953 350cc Isle of Man TT
Last race	1962 250cc German Grand Prix
First win	1957 350cc Isle of Man TT
Last win	1962 250cc Belgium GP
Team(s)	AJS, Bianchi, Gilera, Honda, Norton
Starts / Wins / Podiums / Poles / F. laps / Points; 17 / 5 / 16 / N/A / 9 / 171

Robert MacGregor McIntyre (28 November 1928 – 15 August 1962) was a Scottish motorcycle racer. The first rider to achieve an average speed of 100 mph (160 km/h) for one lap of the Snaefell Mountain Course in 1957, McIntyre is also remembered for his five motorcycle Grand Prix wins which included three wins at the Isle of Man TT races, and four victories in the North West 200. He also won the 1959 Race of the Year at Mallory Park. McIntyre died nine days after injuries sustained racing at Oulton Park, Cheshire, England in August 1962.

== Career ==
McIntyre was born in Scotstoun, Glasgow. He entered competition in 1948 on his only transport, an Ariel Red Hunter, and was soon competing in off-road scrambles. After a few seasons he began road racing, but the roads were not always well surfaced. McIntyre rode a BSA at Balado Airfield near Kinross. The concrete track had patches of loose gravel, and he won three of the four races he entered.

=== Racing at Isle of Man ===
For 1952, McIntyre rode a BSA to second in the Isle of Man Junior Clubmans TT, averaging 80.09 mph (128.89 km/h) on his fastest lap. A long association with the Isle of Man Mountain Circuit had begun. Later that year, he returned to win the Manx Junior (350cc) and come second in the Manx Senior (500cc) riding the same AJS 7R in both classes.

=== AJS rider ===
In 1953, following some English National short circuit wins, McIntyre went to the North West 200 for his first International win on an AJS 7R in the 350 cc class. Despite having to retire at the TT that year, his performance was noticed by AJS, and he joined that team for the 1953 Grands Prix World championship. The only win was at Pau in France, there was a third at the Ulster Grand Prix, and he was in the first six placings for the Netherlands, Switzerland and Belgium. In the 1954 Isle of Man Senior TT, McIntyre came 14th on an AJS.

=== Potts Norton privateer ===
AJS pulled out of racing, and McIntyre was soon riding the 'Dustbin' faired Potts Norton. The TT looked to be within reach, and in the 1955 Isle of Man Junior TT, he did lead for four of the seven laps, but brake overheating and suspension problems forced him to slow, allowing Bill Lomas on a Moto Guzzi to go on to victory, with McIntyre second. In the Senior, he managed fifth, with an average of 93.83 mph (151.00 km/h), very good for a private entrant among works teams. Giulio Carcano offered him a Guzzi ride after, but he did not accept.

McIntyre continued to ride the 'Dustbin' faired Norton for Joe Potts, from Bellshill near Glasgow, and continued to win races other than the TT. The 1956 TT saw retirements with mechanical problems.

=== Gilera and the World Championship Grand Prix ===
In 1957, owing to personal intervention by injured Gilera works rider Geoff Duke, McIntyre was offered a ride on the four cylinder Gileras for the Isle of Man TT. Race week began with the Junior TT. He broke the lap record with a 97.42 mph (156.78 km/h) and his race average was 94.99 mph (152.87 km/h). In celebration of the Golden Jubilee, the Senior was run over eight laps, a race of 302 miles (486 km). The Gileras had pannier fuel tanks built into the side of the fairings to carry extra fuel. The extra fuel weight didn't stop him from making a 99.99 mph (160.92 km/h) first lap. The second lap saw 101.03 mph (162.59 km/h), and the fourth lap was the fastest at 101.12 mph (162.74 km/h). He caught up to, and overtook 1956 World Champion, John Surtees who was riding an MV Agusta 500. McIntyre went on to win, after racing for three hours, two minutes and fifty-seven seconds. This was McIntyre's best TT.

The 1957 World Championship looked to be within reach, but a crash at Assen, in the Dutch TT meant he was out of action for a couple of months. He did come second in the 500 cc Ulster Grand Prix, and won the 350 cc Nations Grand Prix at Monza. His teammate Libero Liberati won the 500 cc World Championship that year, with McIntyre coming second. McIntyre was third in the 350 cc World Championship as well.

At the end of 1957, the Italian teams quit Grand Prix racing citing increasing costs. In November 1957, with racing over, McIntyre rode a 350 cc Gilera racer around the banked circuit at Monza in an attempt to break the one-hour speed record, and he averaged 141 mph (227 km/h) on the bumpy Monza surface. This record was not bettered until 1964, by Mike Hailwood at 144.8 on an MV Agusta, on the track at Daytona.

In the 1961 Isle of Man TT Lightweight race, McIntyre raised the lap record to 99.58 mph (160.26 km/h), and had a strong lead, when his engine seized, ending his race. Riding a Norton in the Senior TT he came second. He won the 1961 250cc Ulster Grand Prix. In the 1962 Isle of Man Lightweight TT, he raised the lap record to 99.61, and then retired with electrical problems. He also rode in Grand Prix races on Honda and Bianchi, making the podium in the Netherlands, Belgium, and East Germany.

In 1962, McIntyre finished second in the Spanish and French Grands Prix, while he had a non-start in the 500 Senior TT and mechanical problems in both the 250 and 350 cc events.

McIntyre went on to win the Belgium GP at the Spa-Francorchamps circuit in the Ardennes, his last victory on the World stage.

=== Oulton Park and death ===
McIntyre still competed in non-championship events, and it was at one such event at Oulton Park, Cheshire in August 1962 that he won the 250 cc race, and then started in the 500 cc race on his Manx Norton. After a bad start in poor conditions, he fought his way to the front before aquaplaning across a stream of water, losing control and crashing into a post holding an advertising sign, sustaining serious head injuries. After nine days in hospital he died.

=== Tribute ===
In 2017, Michael Dunlop recreated McIntyre's achievement with a parade/demonstration on the TT course, at a similar speed with a 100-mph lap on a replica 1957 Gilera, and wearing period clothing.

== Results ==
=== Manx Grand Prix races ===
Year	Race & Capacity	Make of Motorcycle	Average Speed
1952	1st Junior	AJS	85.73 mph (137.97 km/h)
1952	2nd Senior	AJS	87.67 mph (141.09 km/h)

=== Isle of Man TT races ===
Year	Race & Capacity	Make of Motorcycle	Average Speed
1952	2nd Clubmans Junior TT	BSA	78.57 mph (126.45 km/h)
1954	14th Senior TT	AJS	80.13 mph (128.96 km/h)
1955	5th Senior TT	Norton	93.83 mph (151.00 km/h)
1955	2nd Junior TT	Norton	91.79 mph (147.72 km/h)
1957	1st Senior TT	Gilera	98.99 mph (159.31 km/h)
1957	1st Junior TT	Gilera	94.99 mph (152.87 km/h)
1959	5th Senior TT	Norton	82.34 mph (132.51 km/h)
1959	1st 500 cc Formula 1 TT	Norton	97.77 mph (157.35 km/h)
1960	3rd Junior TT	AJS	95.11 mph (153.06 km/h)
1961	2nd Senior TT	Norton	99.20 mph (159.65 km/h)

TT Career Summary
Finishing Position	1	2	3	5	14	DNF
Number of times	3	3	1	2	1	11

=== FIM Motor-Cycle Grand Prix races ===
**Position**	1	2	3	4	5	6
**Points**	8	6	4	3	2	1

(key) (Races in bold indicate pole position)

Year	Class	Team	1	2	3	4	5	6	7	8	9	10	11	Points	Rank	Wins
1953	350cc	AJS	IOM; NC	NED -	BEL -	GER -	FRA -	ULS; 2	SUI -	NAT -	ESP -			6	8th	0
1954	350cc	Norton	FRA -	IOM -	ULS; 3	BEL; 6	NED; 4	GER -	SUI; 6	NAT -	ESP -			9	8th	0
1954	500cc	Norton	FRA -	IOM; 14	ULS -	BEL; 4	NED; 6	GER -	SUI -	NAT -	ESP -			4	16th	0
1955	350cc	Norton	ESP -	FRA -	IOM; 2	GER -	BEL -	NED; 5	ULS -	NAT -				8	8th	0
1955	500cc	Norton	ESP -	FRA -	IOM; 5	GER -	BEL -	NED -	ULS; 4	NAT -				5	11th	0
1956	350cc	Norton	IOM; NC	NED -	BEL -	GER -	ULS -	NAT -						0	–	0
1956	500cc	Norton	IOM; NC	NED -	BEL -	GER -	ULS -	NAT -						0	–	0
1957	350cc	Gilera	GER -	IOM; 1	NED; 2	BEL -	ULS -	NAT; 1						22	**3rd**	2
1957	500cc	Gilera	GER; 2	IOM; 1	NED -	BEL -	ULS; 2	NAT -						20	**2nd**	1
1958	350cc	Norton	IOM; NC	NED -	BEL -	GER -	SWE -	ULS; 5	NAT -					2	12th	0
1958	500cc	Norton	IOM; NC	NED -	BEL -	GER -	SWE -	ULS; 2	NAT -					6	9th	0
1959	350cc	AJS	FRA -	IOM; NC	GER -		BEL -	SWE -	ULS -	NAT -				0	–	0
1959	500cc	Norton	FRA -	IOM; 5	GER -	NED -	BEL -		ULS; 2	NAT -				8	6th	0
1960	350cc	AJS	FRA -	IOM; 3	NED -	BEL -	GER -	ULS -	NAT -					4	10th	0
1960	500cc	Norton	FRA -	IOM; NC	NED -	BEL -	GER -	ULS -	NAT -					0	–	0
1961	250cc	Honda	ESP -	GER -	FRA -	IOM; NC	NED; 2	BEL; NC	DDR; 8	ULS; 1	NAT; NC	SWE -	ARG -	14	5th	1
1961	350cc	Bianchi	ESP -	GER -	FRA -	IOM; NC	NED; 2	BEL -	DDR; 3	ULS -	NAT -	SWE; 3	ARG -	14	4th	0
1961	500cc	Norton	ESP -	GER -	FRA -	IOM; 2	NED; 3	BEL; 3	DDR -	ULS -	NAT -	SWE -	ARG -	14	4th	0
1962	250cc	Honda	ESP; 2	FRA; 2	IOM; DNS	NED; 2	BEL; 1	GER; 2	ULS -	DDR -	NAT -	FIN -	ARG -	32	**2nd**	1
1962	350cc	Honda	ESP -	FRA -	IOM; NC	NED; NC	BEL -	GER -	ULS -	DDR -	NAT -	FIN -	ARG -	0	–	0
