= List of Grand Prix motorcycle racers: S =

,

| Name | Seasons | World Championships | MotoGP Wins | 500cc Wins | 350cc Wins | Moto2 Wins | 250cc Wins | Moto3 Wins | 125cc Wins | 80cc Wins | 50cc Wins | MotoE Wins |
|---|---|---|---|---|---|---|---|---|---|---|---|---|
| (Finland) Jarno Saarinen | 1968, 1970–1973 | 1; 250cc - 1972 | 0 | 2 | 5 | 0 | 8 | 0 | 0 | 0 | 0 | 0 |
| (Spain) Daniel Sáez (1985) | 2005-2008 | 0 | 0 | 0 | 0 | 0 | 0 | 0 | 0 | 0 | 0 | 0 |
| (Spain) Daniel Sáez (1996) | 2016 | 0 | 0 | 0 | 0 | 0 | 0 | 0 | 0 | 0 | 0 | 0 |
| (Spain) Andrés Sánchez | 1983-1990, 1992 | 0 | 0 | 0 | 0 | 0 | 0 | 0 | 0 | 0 | 0 | 0 |
| (Spain) Antonio Sánchez | 1983, 1988-1995 | 0 | 0 | 0 | 0 | 0 | 0 | 0 | 0 | 0 | 0 | 0 |
| (Spain) David Sanchís | 2022-2023 | 0 | 0 | 0 | 0 | 0 | 0 | 0 | 0 | 0 | 0 | 0 |
| (United Kingdom) Cecil Sandford | 1950-1957 | 2; 125cc - 1952; 250cc - 1957 | 0 | 0 | 0 | 0 | 2 | 0 | 3 | 0 | 0 | 0 |
| (Italy) Guido Sala | 1952, 1954, 1957 | 0 | 0 | 0 | 0 | 0 | 0 | 0 | 1 | 0 | 0 | 0 |
| (Czech Republic) Filip Salač | 2018- | 0 | 0 | 0 | 0 | 0 | 0 | 1 | 0 | 0 | 0 | 0 |
| (Indonesia) Gerry Salim | 2019 | 0 | 0 | 0 | 0 | 0 | 0 | 0 | 0 | 0 | 0 | 0 |
| (Finland) Rico Salmela | 2026- | 0 | 0 | 0 | 0 | 0 | 0 | 0 | 0 | 0 | 0 | 0 |
| (Spain) David Salom | 2012 | 0 | 0 | 0 | 0 | 0 | 0 | 0 | 0 | 0 | 0 | 0 |
| (Spain) Luis Salom | 2009-2016 | 0 | 0 | 0 | 0 | 0 | 0 | 9 | 0 | 0 | 0 | 0 |
| (United Kingdom) Charlie Salt | 1949-1957 | 0 | 0 | 0 | 0 | 0 | 0 | 0 | 0 | 0 | 0 | 0 |
| (Spain) David Salvador | 2021-2023 | 0 | 0 | 0 | 0 | 0 | 0 | 0 | 0 | 0 | 0 | 0 |
| (Italy) Luca Salvadori | 2023 | 0 | 0 | 0 | 0 | 0 | 0 | 0 | 0 | 0 | 0 | 0 |
| (Italy) Federico Sandi | 2005-2008 | 0 | 0 | 0 | 0 | 0 | 0 | 0 | 0 | 0 | 0 | 0 |
| (France) Christian Sarron | 1976-1990 | 1; 250cc - 1984 | 0 | 1 | 0 | 0 | 6 | 0 | 0 | 0 | 0 | 0 |
| (Japan) Ayumu Sasaki | 2016- | 0 | 0 | 0 | 0 | 0 | 0 | 3 | 0 | 0 | 0 | 0 |
| (Italy) Lorenzo Savadori | 2008-2010, 2019-2025 | 0 | 0 | 0 | 0 | 0 | 0 | 0 | 0 | 0 | 0 | 0 |
| (Germany) Marcel Schrötter | 2008-2022, 2024 | 0 | 0 | 0 | 0 | 0 | 0 | 0 | 0 | 0 | 0 | 0 |
| (United States) Kevin Schwantz | 1986-1995 | 1; 500cc - 1993 | 0 | 25 | 0 | 0 | 0 | 0 | 0 | 0 | 0 | 0 |
| (Japan) Taro Sekiguchi | 1999-2002, 2004–2007, 2016 | 0 | 0 | 0 | 0 | 0 | 0 | 0 | 0 | 0 | 0 | 0 |
| (Malaysia) Danial Shahril | 2023-2024 | 0 | 0 | 0 | 0 | 0 | 0 | 0 | 0 | 0 | 0 | 0 |
| (United Kingdom) Barry Sheene | 1970-1984 | 2; 500cc - 1976-1977 | 0 | 19 | 0 | 0 | 0 | 0 | 3 | 0 | 1 | 0 |
| (Spain) Iván Silva | 1998-1999, 2001, 2004, 2006–2007, 2012–2013 | 0 | 0 | 0 | 0 | 0 | 0 | 0 | 0 | 0 | 0 | 0 |
| (Belgium) Xavier Siméon | 2010-2020 | 0 | 0 | 0 | 0 | 1 | 0 | 0 | 0 | 0 | 0 | 0 |
| (United Kingdom) Dave Simmonds | 1963-1972 | 1 125cc - 1969 | 0 | 1 | 0 | 0 | 0 | 0 | 10 | 0 | 0 | 0 |
| (Spain) Julián Simón | 2002-2017 | 1 125cc - 2009 | 0 | 0 | 0 | 0 | 0 | 0 | 8 | 0 | 0 | 0 |
| (Italy) Marco Simoncelli | 2002-2011 | 1 250cc - 2008 | 0 | 0 | 0 | 0 | 12 | 0 | 2 | 0 | 0 | 0 |
| (Australia) Olly Simpson | 2014-2015 | 0 | 0 | 0 | 0 | 0 | 0 | 0 | 0 | 0 | 0 | 0 |
| (Australia) Arthur Sissis | 2011-2014 | 0 | 0 | 0 | 0 | 0 | 0 | 0 | 0 | 0 | 0 | 0 |
| (Scotland) Rory Skinner | 2022-2023 | 0 | 0 | 0 | 0 | 0 | 0 | 0 | 0 | 0 | 0 | 0 |
| (Australia) Barry Smith | 1965-1981 | 0 | 0 | 0 | 0 | 0 | 0 | 0 | 1 | 0 | 3 | 0 |
| (United Kingdom) Bradley Smith | 2006-2020, 2022 | 0 | 0 | 0 | 0 | 0 | 0 | 0 | 3 | 0 | 0 | 0 |
| (Czech Republic) Jakub Smrž | 1998-2006 | 0 | 0 | 0 | 0 | 0 | 0 | 0 | 0 | 0 | 0 | 0 |
| (United States) Freddie Spencer | 1980-1987, 1989, 1993 | 3; 250cc - 1985; 500cc - 1983, 1985 | 0 | 20 | 0 | 0 | 7 | 0 | 0 | 0 | 0 | 0 |
| (United States) Ben Spies | 2008-2013 | 0 | 1 | 0 | 0 | 0 | 0 | 0 | 0 | 0 | 0 | 0 |
| (Italy) Nicholas Spinelli | 2023-2025 | 0 | 0 | 0 | 0 | 0 | 0 | 0 | 0 | 0 | 0 | 4 |
| (Denmark) Svend Aage Sørensen | 1951-1953 | 0 | 0 | 0 | 0 | 0 | 0 | 0 | 0 | 0 | 0 | 0 |
| (Italy) Emilio Soprani | 1949-1953 | 0 | 0 | 0 | 0 | 0 | 0 | 0 | 0 | 0 | 0 | 0 |
| (Czech Republic) František Srna | 1971-1972 | 0 | 0 | 0 | 0 | 0 | 0 | 0 | 0 | 0 | 0 | 0 |
| (Australia) Bryan Staring | 2004, 2013, 2018 | 0 | 0 | 0 | 0 | 0 | 0 | 0 | 0 | 0 | 0 | 0 |
| (Czech Republic) František Šťastný | 1957-1969 | 0 | 0 | 1 | 3 | 0 | 0 | 0 | 0 | 0 | 0 | 0 |
| (United Kingdom) Fred Stevens | 1959-1967 | 0 | 0 | 0 | 0 | 0 | 0 | 0 | 0 | 0 | 0 | 0 |
| (Australia) Casey Stoner | 2001-2012 | 2 MotoGP - 2007, 2011 | 38 | 0 | 0 | 0 | 5 | 0 | 2 | 0 | 0 | 0 |
| (New Zealand) Andrew Stroud | 1992-1996 | 0 | 0 | 0 | 0 | 0 | 0 | 0 | 0 | 0 | 0 | 0 |
| (Indonesia) Rafid Topan Sucipto | 2012-2013, 2018 | 0 | 0 | 0 | 0 | 0 | 0 | 0 | 0 | 0 | 0 | 0 |
| (Italy) Alberto Surra | 2021-2025 | 0 | 0 | 0 | 0 | 0 | 0 | 0 | 0 | 0 | 0 | 0 |
| (United Kingdom) John Surtees | 1952-1960 | 7; 350cc - 1958-1960; 500cc - 1956, 1958-1960 | 0 | 22 | 15 | 0 | 1 | 0 | 0 | 0 | 0 | 0 |
| (Japan) Tatsuki Suzuki | 2015-2024 | 0 | 0 | 0 | 0 | 0 | 0 | 3 | 0 | 0 | 0 | 0 |
| (Malaysia) Hafizh Syahrin | 2011-2021 | 0 | 0 | 0 | 0 | 0 | 0 | 3 | 0 | 0 | 0 | 0 |
