= Fortunato Libanori =

Italian motorcycle racer (1934–2006)

- Nationality: Italian
- Born: Milan
Motorcycle racing career statistics
Grand Prix motorcycle racing
| Active years | 1956 - 1957 |
| First race | 1956 125cc Belgian Grand Prix |
| Last race | 1957 250cc Dutch TT |
| Team | MV Agusta |
Starts / Wins / Podiums / Poles / F. laps / Points; 5 / 0 / 1 / N/A / N/A / 17

Fortunato Libanori (14 June 1934 – 11 July 2006) was an Italian Grand Prix motorcycle road racer. His best year was in 1956 when he finished fifth in the 125cc world championship.

== Motorcycle Grand Prix results ==
| Year | Class | Team | Motorcycle | 1 | 2 | 3 | 4 | 5 | 6 | Points | Position | Wins |
|---|---|---|---|---|---|---|---|---|---|---|---|---|
| 1956 | 125 cc | MV Agusta | 125 Bialbero | IOM - | NED ? | BEL; 2 | GER; 4 | ULS - | NAT; DNF | 9 | 5th | 0 |
| 1957 | 125 cc | MV Agusta | 125 Bialbero | GER - | IOM - | NED; 5 | BEL - | ULS - | NAT; 4 | 5 | 8th | 0 |
| 1957 | 250 cc | MV Agusta | 250 Monocilindrica Bialbero | GER - | IOM - | NED; 4 | BEL - | ULS - | NAT - | 3 | 14th | 0 |
