= 1956 German motorcycle Grand Prix =

(West Germany) 1956 German Grand Prix
Race details
- Race 4 of 6 races in the 1956 Grand Prix motorcycle racing season
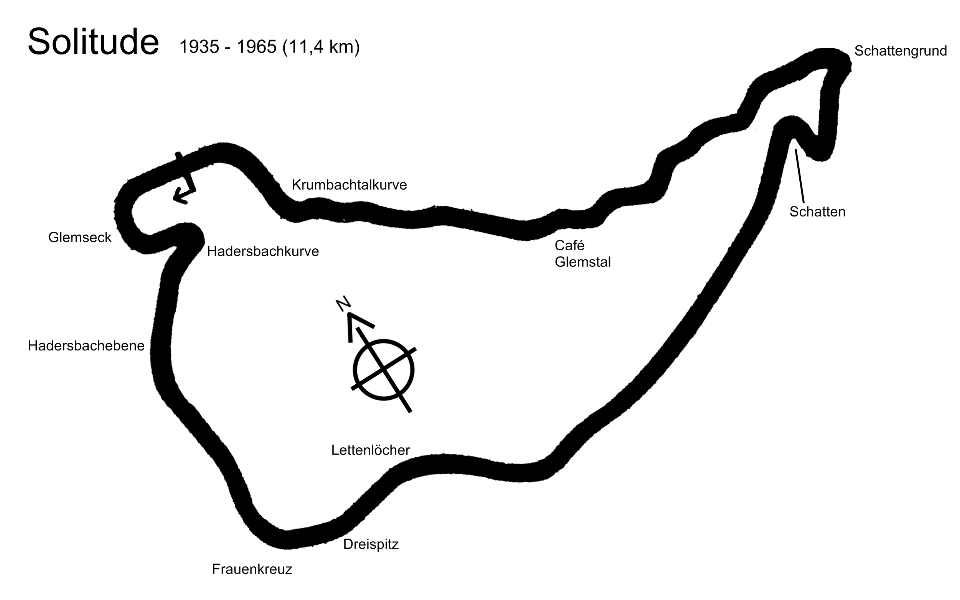
- Date: 21–22 July 1956
- Location: Solitude
- Course: Permanent racing facility; 11.409 km (7.089 mi)

500cc
- Rider
Fastest lap
Rider	(United Kingdom) Bill Lomas	Moto Guzzi
Time	4:27.9	
Podium
First	(Republic of Ireland) Reg Armstrong	Gilera
Second	(Italy) Umberto Masetti	MV Agusta
Third	(France) Pierre Monneret	Gilera

350cc
- Rider
Fastest lap
Rider	(United Kingdom) Bill Lomas	Moto Guzzi
Time	4:36.0	
Podium
First	(United Kingdom) Bill Lomas	Moto Guzzi
Second	(West Germany) August Hobl	DKW
Third	(United Kingdom) Dickie Dale	Moto Guzzi

250cc
- Rider
Fastest lap
Rider	(Italy) Carlo Ubbiali	MV Agusta
Time	4:45.2	
Podium
First	(Italy) Carlo Ubbiali	MV Agusta
Second	(Switzerland) Luigi Taveri	MV Agusta
Third	(Italy) Remo Venturi	MV Agusta

125cc
- Rider
Fastest lap
Rider	(Italy) Romolo Ferri	Gilera
Time	4:56.0	
Podium
First	(Italy) Romolo Ferri	Gilera
Second	(Italy) Carlo Ubbiali	MV Agusta
Third	(Italy) Tarquinio Provini	Mondial

Sidecar (B2A)
- Rider
Fastest lap
Rider	(West Germany) Wilhelm Noll	BMW
Time	4:54.3	
Podium
First	(West Germany) Wilhelm Noll	BMW
Second	(West Germany) Fritz Hillebrand	BMW
Third	(West Germany) Helmut Fath	BMW

The 1956 German motorcycle Grand Prix was the fourth round of the 1956 Grand Prix motorcycle racing season. It took place on 21–22 July 1956 at the Solitude circuit.

== 500 cc classification ==
Pos	Rider	Manufacturer	Laps	Time	Points
1	(Republic of Ireland) Reg Armstrong	Gilera	18	1:23:16.4	8
2	(Italy) Umberto Masetti	MV Agusta	18	+14.0	6
3	(France) Pierre Monneret	Gilera	18	+41.8	4
4	(Austria) Gerold Klinger	BMW	18		3
5	(South Africa) Eddie Grant	Norton	18		2
6	(Australia) Keith Bryen	Norton	18		1
7	(West Germany) Alois Huber	BMW	18		
8	(West Germany) Ernst Hiller	BMW	18		

== 350 cc classification ==
Pos	Rider	Manufacturer	Laps	Time	Points
1	(United Kingdom) Bill Lomas	Moto Guzzi	13	1:00:52.3	8
2	(West Germany) August Hobl	DKW	13	+31.1	6
3	(United Kingdom) Dickie Dale	Moto Guzzi	13	+1:00.7	4
4	(United Kingdom) Cecil Sandford	DKW	13		3
5	(West Germany) Hans Bartl	DKW	13		2
6	(United Kingdom) Bob Matthews	Norton	13		1
7	(United Kingdom) John Storr	Norton	13		
8	(Australia) Keith Bryen	Norton	13		
9	(West Germany) Helmut Hallmeier	NSU	13		

== 250 cc classification ==
Pos	Rider	Manufacturer	Laps	Time	Points
1	(Italy) Carlo Ubbiali	MV Agusta	13	1:02:58.6	8
2	(Switzerland) Luigi Taveri	MV Agusta	13	+54.2	6
3	(Italy) Remo Venturi	MV Agusta	13	+57.9	4
4	(West Germany) Hans Baltisberger	NSU	13		3
5	(Australia) Bob Brown	NSU	13		2
6	(West Germany) Roland Heck	NSU	13		1
7	(West Germany) Fritz Kläger	NSU	13		
8	(West Germany) Horst Kassner	NSU	13		

== 125cc classification ==
Pos	Rider	Manufacturer	Laps	Time/Retired	Points
1	(Italy) Romolo Ferri	Gilera	9	45:04.2	8
2	(Italy) Carlo Ubbiali	MV Agusta	9	+8.8	6
3	(Italy) Tarquinio Provini	Mondial	9	+16.8	4
4	(Italy) Fortunato Libanori	MV Agusta	9	+1:27.6	3
5	(West Germany) August Hobl	DKW	9	+1:40.6	2
6	(United Kingdom) Cecil Sandford	Mondial	9	+2:06.6	1
7	(West Germany) Karl Hofmann	DKW	9		
8	(Italy) Alano Montanari	Ducati	9		
9	(Spain) Marcelo Cama	Montesa	9		
10	(East Germany) Ernst Degner	MZ	9		
11	(Italy) Adelmo Mandolini	Ducati	9		
12	(West Germany) Karl Lottes	DKW	9		
31 starters, 24 finishers

== Sidecar classification ==
Pos	Rider	Passenger	Manufacturer	Laps	Time	Points
1	(West Germany) Wilhelm Noll	(West Germany) Fritz Cron	BMW	9	45:04.9	8
2	(West Germany) Fritz Hillebrand	(West Germany) Manfred Grunwald	BMW	9	+0.9	6
3	(West Germany) Helmut Fath	(West Germany) Emil Ohr	BMW	9	+1:15.8	4
4	(West Germany) Walter Schneider	(West Germany) Hans Strauss	BMW	9		3
5	(United Kingdom) Cyril Smith	(United Kingdom) Stanley Dibben	Norton	9		2
6	(West Germany) Loni Neussner	(West Germany) Dieter Hess	BMW	9		1
7	(United Kingdom) Pip Harris	(United Kingdom) Ray Campbell	Norton	9		
8	(Switzerland) Florian Camathias	(Switzerland) Maurice Büla	BMW	9		
9	(France) Jacques Drion	(Switzerland) Inge Stoll	BMW	9		
10	(Switzerland) Edgar Strub	(West Germany) Hilmar Cecco	Norton	9		
11	(West Germany) Otto Schmid	?	BMW	9		
12	(France) Jean Murit	(Morocco) Francis Flahaut	BMW	9		

Previous race: 1956 Belgian Grand Prix	FIM Grand Prix World Championship; 1956 season	Next race: 1956 Ulster Grand Prix
Previous race: 1955 German Grand Prix	German Grand Prix	Next race: 1957 German Grand Prix
