= Luigi Taveri =

Swiss motorcycle racer (1929–2018)

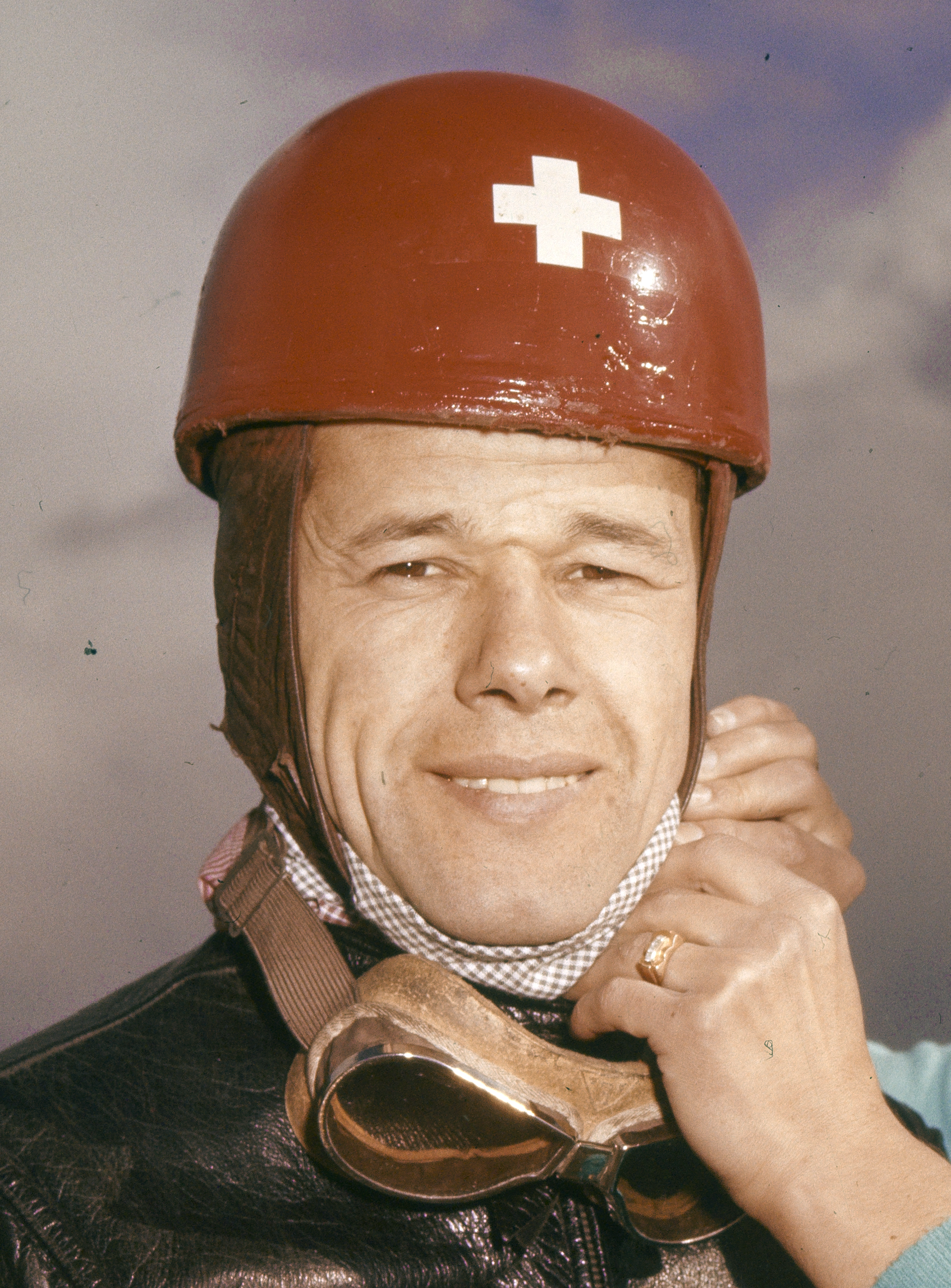
- Luigi Taveri, c. 1957
- Nationality: Swiss
- Born: 19 September 1929; Horgen, Zürich, Switzerland
- Died: 1 March 2018 (aged 88)
Motorcycle racing career statistics
Grand Prix motorcycle racing
Active years	1954–1966
First race	1954 500cc French Grand Prix
Last race	1966 125cc Nations Grand Prix
First win	1955 125cc Spanish Grand Prix
Last win	1966 125cc Nations Grand Prix
Team	Yamaha
Championships	125cc – 1962, 1964, 1966
Starts / Wins / Podiums / Poles / F. laps / Points; 143 / 30 / 89 / N/A / 28 / 541

Luigi Taveri (19 September 1929 – 1 March 2018) was a Swiss professional Grand Prix motorcycle road racer. He competed in the FIM motorcycle Grand Prix world championships from 1954 to 1966. Taveri is notable for being a three-time 125cc road racing world champion. Although he specialised in the smaller engined machines, Taveri is the only competitor to have scored points in six Grand Prix classes: 50cc, 125cc, 250cc, 350cc, 500cc and Sidecars. In 2016, he was named an FIM Legend for his motorcycling achievements.

== Racing career ==
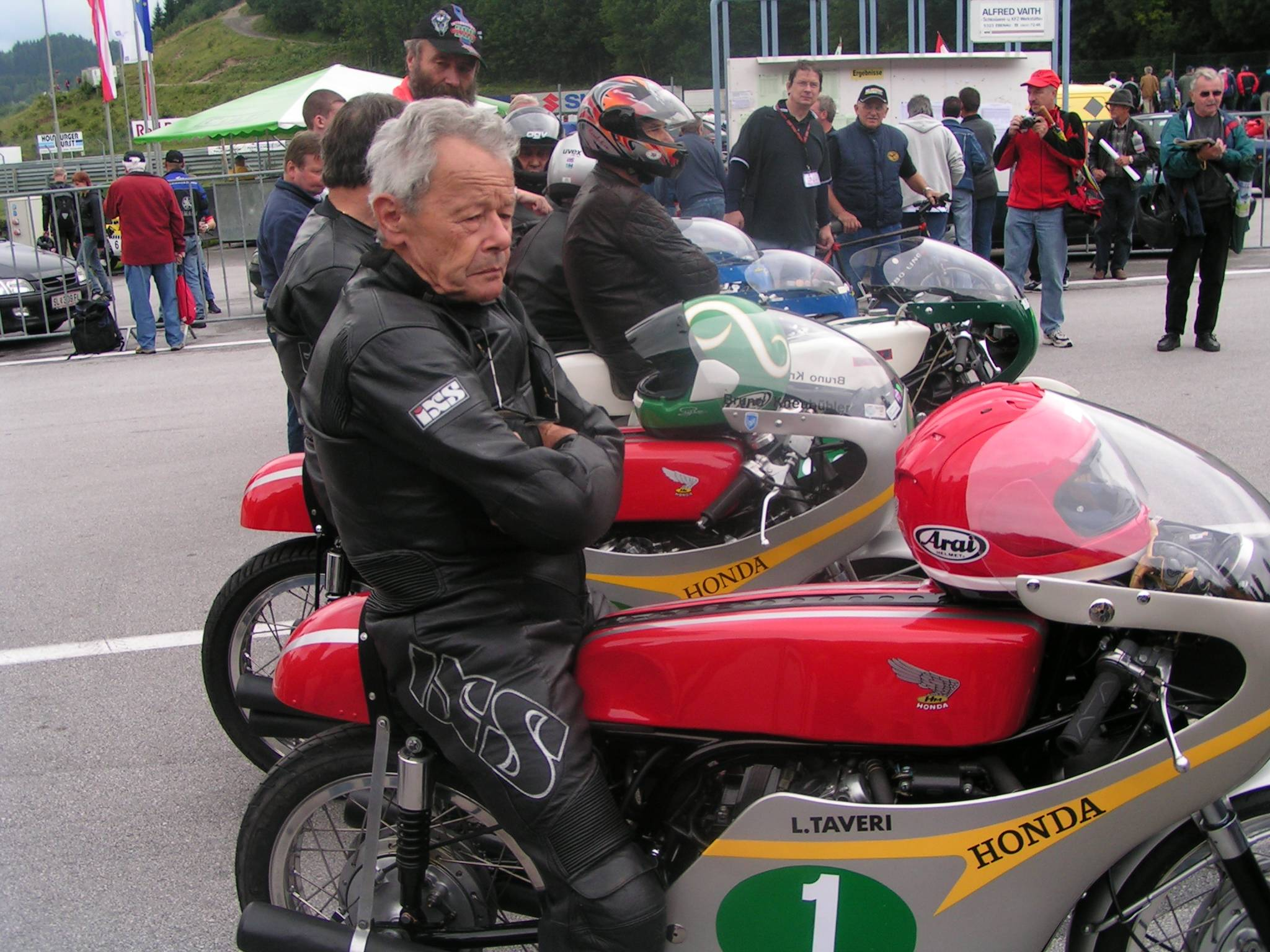
Taveri at the Salzburgring track in 2005

Taveri made his world championship debut in the 1954 season, racing in the 500 cc class on a Norton motorcycle. In 1955, he took his first win in the 125 cc race at the Spanish Grand Prix. He took one more win in 1955, in the 250 cc class at the Dutch TT.

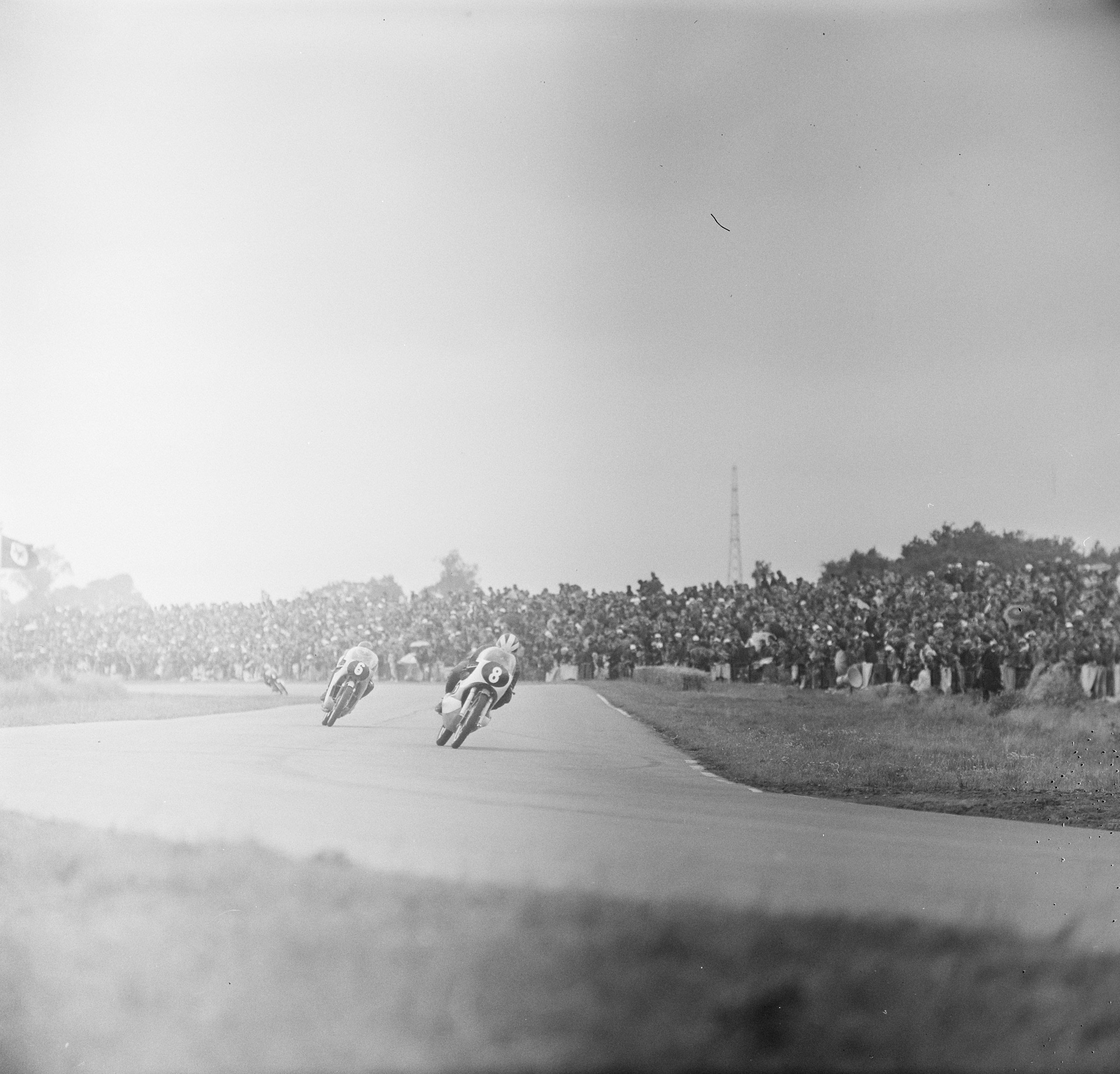
Taveri (6) pursues Phil Read (8) during the 1966 125cc Dutch TT.

Taveri participated in the Isle of Man TT on several occasions from 1955 to 1966 with three victories and several second places amongst his results.

During his career, Taveri rode for MV Agusta, and became a works rider for Ducati, MZ, Kreidler and in 1961 for Yamaha. His final Grand Prix victory at the 1966 125cc Italian Grand Prix came 11 years and 133 days after his first win, marking one of the longest winning careers in the Grand Prix motorcycle racing history. Over his racing career, Taveri had 30 victories and 89 podiums in all classes, including three Isle of Man TT victories. After retiring from competition, he continued in the sport by demonstrating historic machines.

Taveri died on 1 March 2018 of complications from a stroke at the age of 88.

== Motorcycle Grand Prix results ==
Position	1	2	3	4	5	6
Points	8	6	4	3	2	1

(key) (Races in italics indicate fastest lap)

Year	Class	Team	1	2	3	4	5	6	7	8	9	10	11	12	13	Points	Rank	Wins
1954	250cc	Moto Guzzi	FRA -	IOM -	ULS -		NED -	GER -	SUI; 4	NAT -						3	13th	0
1954	500cc	Norton	FRA; 4	IOM -	ULS -	BEL -	NED; 8	GER -	SUI -	NAT -	ESP -					3	17th	0
1954	Sidecar	Norton		IOM -	ULS -	BEL -		GER -	SUI; 6	NAT -						1	10th	0
1955	125cc	MV Agusta	ESP; 1	FRA; 2	IOM; 2	GER; 2	NED -		NAT -							26	2nd	1
1955	250cc	MV Agusta			IOM -	GER; 4	NED; 1	ULS -	NAT -							11	4th	1
1956	125cc	MV Agusta	IOM -	NED; 2	BEL; 4	GER -	ULS -	NAT; 4								12	3rd	0
1956	250cc	MV Agusta	IOM -	NED; 2	BEL; 2	GER; 2	ULS; 1	NAT; 4								26	2nd	1
1957	125cc	MV Agusta	GER; 5	IOM; 3	NED; 3	BEL; 2	ULS; 1	NAT; 3								22	2nd	1
1957	250cc	MV Agusta	GER; 5	IOM; 2	NED -	BEL -	ULS -	NAT -								8	7th	0
1958	125cc	Ducati	IOM -	NED; 2	BEL; 6	GER -	SWE; 2	ULS; 2	NAT; 5							20	3rd	0
1958	350cc	Norton	IOM -	NED; 6	BEL -	GER -	SWE -	ULS -	NAT -							1	15th	0
1959	125cc	MZ	IOM; 2													14	4th	0
1959	125cc	Ducati		GER -	NED -	BEL; 3	SWE -	ULS -	NAT; 3							14	4th	0
1959	250cc	MZ	IOM -	GER -	NED -	BEL -	SWE -	ULS -	NAT; 5							2	13th	0
1960	125cc	MV Agusta	IOM; 3	NED -	BEL -		ULS; 5	NAT -								6	6th	0
1960	250cc	MV Agusta	IOM; 8	NED; 3	BEL; 3	GER; 5	ULS; 6	NAT -								11	3rd	0
1961	125cc	Yamaha	ESP -	GER; 5	FRA; 5	IOM; 2	NED -	BEL; 1	DDR; DSQ	ULS; 6	NAT; 3	SWE; 1	ARG -			30	3rd	2
1961	250cc	Yamaha	ESP -	GER -	FRA -	IOM -	NED -	BEL -	DDR -	ULS -	NAT -	SWE; 2	ARG -			6	10th	0
1962	50cc	Yamaha	ESP; 3	FRA; 3	IOM; 2	NED; 9	BEL; 3	GER; 4		DDR; 4	NAT; 6	FIN; 1	ARG -			29	3rd	1
1962	125cc	Yamaha	ESP; 3	FRA; 4	IOM; 1	NED; 1	BEL; 1	GER; 1	ULS; 1	DDR; 1	NAT; 2	FIN; 2	ARG -			48	1st	6
1962	250cc	Yamaha	ESP -	FRA -	IOM -	NED -	BEL; 3	GER -	ULS; 3	DDR -	NAT; NC		ARG -			8	8th	0
1963	50cc	Yamaha	ESP -	GER -	FRA -	IOM -	NED -	BEL -			FIN -		ARG -	JPN; 1		8	8th	1
1963	125cc	Yamaha	ESP; 1	GER; 4	FRA; 3	IOM; 4	NED; 3	BEL; 3	ULS; 3	DDR; 4	FIN; 2	NAT; 1	ARG; NC	JPN; NC		38	2nd	2
1963	250cc	Yamaha	ESP; 5	GER; NC		IOM; NC	NED; NC	BEL; 4	ULS; NC	DDR; 5		NAT; 3	ARG -	JPN; 5		13	5th	0
1963	350cc	Yamaha		GER -		IOM -	NED; 3		ULS; 3	DDR; 2	FIN; 5	NAT; NC				16	3rd	0
1964	50cc	Yamaha	USA -	ESP; 6	FRA -	IOM -	NED -	BEL -	GER -			FIN; 3		JPN -		5	7th	0
1964	125cc	Yamaha	USA -	ESP; 1	FRA; 1	IOM; 1	NED -		GER; 2	DDR; 2	ULS; 2	FIN; 1	NAT; 1	JPN; 2		46	1st	5
1964	250cc	Yamaha	USA -	ESP; NC	FRA; 2	IOM; NC	NED -	BEL -	GER; 6	DDR -	ULS; NC		NAT; 6	JPN; 4		11	6th	0
1965	50cc	Yamaha	USA -	GER; 2	ESP; 4	FRA; 2	IOM; 1	NED; 3	BEL; 3						JPN; 1	32	2nd	2
1965	125cc	Yamaha	USA -	GER; NC	ESP; NC	FRA; NC	IOM; 2	NED; 5		DDR -	CZE -	ULS -	FIN -	NAT -	JPN; 2	14	5th	0
1966	50cc	Yamaha	ESP; 1	GER; 4	NED; 1					IOM; 2	NAT; 3	JPN -				26	3rd	2
1966	125cc	Yamaha	ESP; 2	GER; 1	NED; 2	DDR; 1	CZE; 1	FIN; 2	ULS; 1	IOM; 8	NAT; 1	JPN -				46	1st	5
