= Keith Bryen =

Australian motorcycle racer

- Nationality: Australian
- Born: Keith Maxwell Bryen; 29 May 1927
- Died: 22 October 2013 (aged 86)
Motorcycle racing career statistics
Grand Prix motorcycle racing
Active years	1956 - 1957
First race	1956 500cc Dutch TT
Last race	1957 500cc Ulster Grand Prix
Starts / Wins / Podiums / Poles / F. laps / Points; 8 / 0 / 3 / N/A / N/A / 23

Keith Bryen (29 May 1927 – 22 October 2013) was a Grand Prix motorcycle road racer from Australia. His best season was in 1957 when he finished fourth in the 350cc world championship.
