= Helmut Hallmeier =

German motorcycle racer

- Nationality: German
Motorcycle racing career statistics
Grand Prix motorcycle racing
Active years	1954 - 1955, 1957
First race	1954 250cc West German Grand Prix
Last race	1957 350cc West German Grand Prix
Team	NSU
Starts / Wins / Podiums / Poles / F. laps / Points; 4 / 0 / 2 / N/A / N/A / 10

Helmut Hallmeier (1933 – 26 June 1976) was a former Grand Prix motorcycle road racer from the Germany. His best years were in 1954 when he finished the season in ninth place in the 250cc world championship and 1957 when he finished in ninth place in the 350cc world championship.
