= Romolo Ferri =

Italian motorcycle racer (1928–2015)

- Nationality: Italian
Motorcycle racing career statistics
Grand Prix motorcycle racing
Active years	1951 - 1952, 1954 - 1956, 1958
First race	1951 125cc Nations Grand Prix
Last race	1958 125cc Belgian Grand Prix
First win	1956 125cc German Grand Prix
Last win	1956 125cc German Grand Prix
Team(s)	Mondial, Gilera
Starts / Wins / Podiums / Poles / F. laps / Points; 9 / 1 / 7 / 0 / 4 / 48

Romolo Ferri (23 November 1928 – 13 May 2015) was an Italian Grand Prix motorcycle road racer. He had his most successful year in 1956, when he won the 125cc German Grand Prix and finished the season in second place behind Carlo Ubbiali.
