= 1956 Nations motorcycle Grand Prix =

(Italy) 1956 Nations Grand Prix
Race details
- Race 6 of 6 races in the 1956 Grand Prix motorcycle racing season
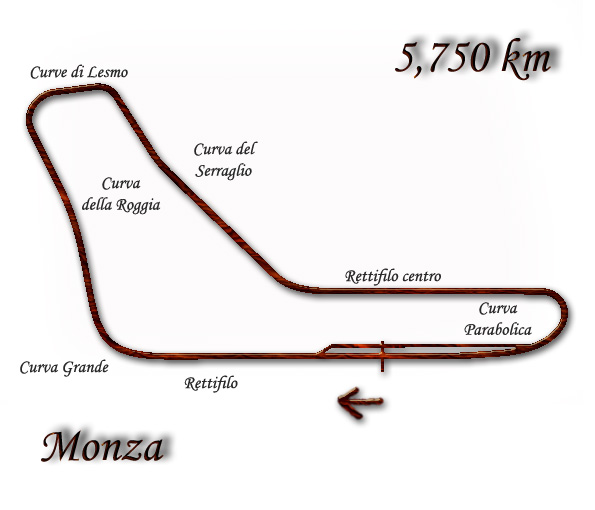
- Date: 9 September 1956
- Location: Autodromo Nazionale Monza
- Course: Permanent racing facility; 5.75 km (3.57 mi)

500cc
- Rider
Fastest lap
| Rider | (United Kingdom) Geoff Duke (Italy) Libero Liberati | Gilera; Gilera |
| Time | 1:50.4 | |
Podium
| First | (United Kingdom) Geoff Duke | Gilera |
| Second | (Italy) Libero Liberati | Gilera |
| Third | (France) Pierre Monneret | Gilera |

350cc
- Rider
Fastest lap
| Rider | (Italy) Libero Liberati | Gilera |
| Time | 1:52.0 | |
Podium
| First | (Italy) Libero Liberati | Gilera |
| Second | (United Kingdom) Dickie Dale | Moto Guzzi |
| Third | (Italy) Roberto Colombo | MV Agusta |

250cc
- Rider
Fastest lap
| Rider | (Italy) Carlo Ubbiali | MV Agusta |
| Time | 2:00.4 | |
Podium
| First | (Italy) Carlo Ubbiali | MV Agusta |
| Second | (Italy) Enrico Lorenzetti | Moto Guzzi |
| Third | (Italy) Remo Venturi | MV Agusta |

125cc
- Rider
Fastest lap
| Rider | (Italy) Tarquinio Provini | Mondial |
| Time | 2:06.2 | |
Podium
| First | (Italy) Carlo Ubbiali | MV Agusta |
| Second | (Italy) Tarquinio Provini | Mondial |
| Third | (Italy) Renato Sartori | Mondial |

The 1956 Nations motorcycle Grand Prix was the sixth and final round of the 1956 Grand Prix motorcycle racing season. It took place on 9 September 1956 at the Autodromo Nazionale Monza.

== 500 cc classification ==
| Pos | Rider | Manufacturer | Laps | Time | Points |
|---|---|---|---|---|---|
| 1 | (United Kingdom) Geoff Duke | Gilera | 35 | 1:05:59.2 | 8 |
| 2 | (Italy) Libero Liberati | Gilera | 35 | +0.1 | 6 |
| 3 | (France) Pierre Monneret | Gilera | 35 | +40.8 | 4 |
| 4 | (Republic of Ireland) Reg Armstrong | Gilera | 35 | | 3 |
| 5 | (Italy) Carlo Bandirola | MV Agusta | 35 | | 2 |
| 6 | (West Germany) Walter Zeller | BMW | 35 | | 1 |
| 7 | (Italy) Roberto Colombo | MV Agusta | 35 | | |
| 8 | (Italy) Alfredo Milani | Gilera | 34 | +1 lap | |
| 9 | (Austria) Gerold Klinger | BMW | 33 | +2 laps | |
| 10 | (West Germany) Ernst Hiller | BMW | 33 | +2 laps | |
| 11 | (West Germany) Ernst Riedelbauch | BMW | 33 | +2 laps | |
| 12 | (United Kingdom) John Storr | Norton | 33 | +2 laps | |
| 13 | (Italy) Giuseppe Cantoni | Gilera | 32 | +3 laps | |

== 350 cc classification ==
| Pos | Rider | Manufacturer | Laps | Time | Points |
|---|---|---|---|---|---|
| 1 | (Italy) Libero Liberati | Gilera | 27 | 52:12.9 | 8 |
| 2 | (United Kingdom) Dickie Dale | Moto Guzzi | 27 | +1:15.3 | 6 |
| 3 | (Italy) Roberto Colombo | MV Agusta | 27 | +1:48.3 | 4 |
| 4 | (West Germany) Karl Hofmann | DKW | 26 | +1 lap | 3 |
| 5 | (United Kingdom) Cecil Sandford | DKW | 26 | +1 lap | 2 |
| 6 | (West Germany) August Hobl | DKW | 26 | +1 lap | 1 |
| 7 | (West Germany) Hans Bartl | DKW | 26 | +1 lap | |
| 8 | (Italy) Umberto Masetti | MV Agusta | 26 | +1 lap | |
| 9 | (United Kingdom) Arthur Wheeler | Moto Guzzi | 25 | +2 laps | |
| 10 | (United Kingdom) John Storr | Norton | 25 | +2 laps | |
| 11 | (France) Jean-Pierre Bayle | Norton | 24 | +3 laps | |
| 12 | (Spain) Alfredo Flores | Moto Guzzi | 23 | +4 laps | |
| 13 | M. van Son | Norton | 23 | +4 laps | |
| 14 | (West Germany) Fritz Kläger | Horex | 22 | +5 laps | |
| 15 | (West Germany) Heinz Kauert | AJS | 22 | +5 laps | |
| 16 | (France) Albert Montagne | Norton | 22 | +5 laps | |

== 250 cc classification ==
| Pos | Rider | Manufacturer | Laps | Time | Points |
|---|---|---|---|---|---|
| 1 | (Italy) Carlo Ubbiali | MV Agusta | 22 | 45:26.7 | 8 |
| 2 | (Italy) Enrico Lorenzetti | Moto Guzzi | 22 | +1.9 | 6 |
| 3 | (Italy) Remo Venturi | MV Agusta | 22 | +15.5 | 4 |
| 4 | (Switzerland) Luigi Taveri | MV Agusta | 22 | | 3 |
| 5 | (Italy) Alano Montanari | Moto Guzzi | 22 | | 2 |
| 6 | (United Kingdom) Sammy Miller | NSU | 21 | +1 lap | 1 |
| 7 | (West Germany) Horst Kassner | NSU | 21 | +1 lap | |
| 8 | (West Germany) Roland Heck | NSU | 21 | +1 lap | |
| 9 | (Netherlands) Kees Koster | NSU | 21 | +1 lap | |
| 10 | (United Kingdom) Arthur Wheeler | Moto Guzzi | 21 | +1 lap | |
| 11 | (West Germany) Fritz Kläger | NSU | 20 | +2 laps | |
| 12 | (Italy) Guido Paccioca | Moto Guzzi | 20 | +2 laps | |
| 13 | (France) Jean-Pierre Bayle | NSU | 20 | +2 laps | |
| 14 | (West Germany) Adolf Heck | Adler | 19 | +3 laps | |
| 15 | (West Germany) Siegfried Lohmann | Adler | 19 | +3 laps | |

== 125cc classification ==
| Pos | Rider | Manufacturer | Laps | Time | Points |
|---|---|---|---|---|---|
| 1 | (Italy) Carlo Ubbiali | MV Agusta | 18 | 38:38.2 | 8 |
| 2 | (Italy) Tarquinio Provini | Mondial | 18 | +0.4 | 6 |
| 3 | (Italy) Renato Sartori | Mondial | 18 | +57.4 | 4 |
| 4 | (Switzerland) Luigi Taveri | MV Agusta | 18 | +1:39.8 | 3 |
| 5 | (Italy) Sandro Artusi | Ducati | 17 | +1 lap | 2 |
| 6 | (West Germany) Karl Hofmann | DKW | 17 | +1 lap | 1 |
| 7 | (Italy) Alberto Gandossi | Ducati | 17 | +1 lap | |
| 8 | (West Germany) August Hobl | DKW | 17 | +1 lap | |
| 9 | (Sweden) Olle Nygren | Ducati | 16 | +2 laps | |
| 10 | (Gibraltar) John Grace | Montesa | 16 | +2 laps | |
27 starters, 14 finishers

== Sidecar classification ==
| Pos | Rider | Passenger | Manufacturer | Laps | Time | Points |
|---|---|---|---|---|---|---|
| 1 | (Italy) Albino Milani | (Italy) Rossano Milani | Gilera | 18 | 39:19.6 | 8 |
| 2 | (United Kingdom) Pip Harris | (United Kingdom) Ray Campbell | Norton | 18 | +43.5 | 6 |
| 3 | (West Germany) Fritz Hillebrand | (West Germany) Manfred Grunwald | BMW | 18 | +55.1 | 4 |
| 4 | (Switzerland) Florian Camathias | (Switzerland) Maurice Büla | BMW | 18 | | 3 |
| 5 | (France) Jacques Drion | (Switzerland) Inge Stoll | BMW | 18 | | 2 |
| 6 | (West Germany) Walter Schneider | (West Germany) Hans Strauss | BMW | 18 | | 1 |
| 7 | (West Germany) Helmut Fath | (West Germany) Emil Ohr | BMW | 17 | +1 lap | |
| 8 | (France) Jean Murit | (Morocco) Francis Flahaut | BMW | 17 | +1 lap | |
| 9 | (West Germany) Loni Neussner | (West Germany) Dieter Hess | BMW | 17 | +1 lap | |
| 10 | (Italy) Alfonso Sammarchi | ? | Norton | 16 | +2 laps | |

| Previous race: 1956 Ulster Grand Prix | FIM Grand Prix World Championship; 1956 season | Next race: 1957 German Grand Prix |
| Previous race: 1955 Nations Grand Prix | Nations Grand Prix | Next race: 1957 Nations Grand Prix |
