= 1956 Ulster Grand Prix =

Motorcycle race in Northern Ireland

Race details
- Race 4 of 6 races in the 1956 Grand Prix motorcycle racing season
- Date: 9–11 August 1956
- Location: Dundrod Circuit
- Course: Public roads; 11.934 km (7.415 mi)

500cc
- Rider
Fastest lap
Rider	(United Kingdom) Geoff Duke	Gilera
Time	4:42.6	
Podium
First	(United Kingdom) John Hartle	Norton
Second	(Australia) Bob Brown	Matchless
Third	(New Zealand) Peter Murphy	Matchless

350cc
- Rider
Fastest lap
Rider	(United Kingdom) Bill Lomas	Moto Guzzi
Time	4:51.0	
Podium
First	(United Kingdom) Bill Lomas	Moto Guzzi
Second	(United Kingdom) Dickie Dale	Moto Guzzi
Third	(United Kingdom) John Hartle	Norton

250cc
- Rider
Fastest lap
Rider	(Italy) Carlo Ubbiali	MV Agusta
Time	4:58.6	
Podium
First	(Switzerland) Luigi Taveri	MV Agusta
Second	(United Kingdom) Sammy Miller	NSU
Third	(United Kingdom) Arthur Wheeler	Moto Guzzi

125cc
- Rider
Fastest lap
Rider	(Italy) Carlo Ubbiali	MV Agusta
Time	5:24.0	
Podium
First	(Italy) Carlo Ubbiali	MV Agusta
Second	(Italy) Romolo Ferri	Gilera
Third	(United Kingdom) Bill Webster	MV Agusta

Sidecar (B2A)
- Rider
Fastest lap
Rider	(West Germany) Wilhelm Noll	BMW
Time	5:29.0	
Podium
First	(West Germany) Wilhelm Noll	BMW
Second	(United Kingdom) Pip Harris	Norton
Third	(Switzerland) Florian Camathias	BMW

The 1956 Ulster Grand Prix was the fifth round of the 1956 Grand Prix motorcycle racing season. It took place on 9–11 August 1956 at the Dundrod Circuit.

== 500 cc classification ==
Pos	Rider	Manufacturer	Laps	Time	Points
1	(United Kingdom) John Hartle	Norton	27	2:20:14.6	8
2	(Australia) Bob Brown	Matchless	27	+2:47.4	6
3	(New Zealand) Peter Murphy	Matchless	27	+2:48.4	4
4	(United Kingdom) Geoff Tanner	Norton	27		3
5	(United Kingdom) Wilfred Herron	Norton	26	+1 lap	2
6	(United Kingdom) Jack Brett	Norton	26	+1 lap	1
7	(United Kingdom) Austin Carson	Norton	26	+1 lap	
8	(United Kingdom) Dave Chadwick	Norton	26	+1 lap	
9	(United Kingdom) Alan Trow	Norton	25	+2 laps	
10	(United Kingdom) A. Martin	Matchless	25	+2 laps	
11	D. G. Chapman	Norton	24	+3 laps	
12	S. Murray	Norton	24	+3 laps	
13	(United Kingdom) Ralph Rensen	Norton	24	+3 laps	
14	(United Kingdom) Tom Turner	Norton	24	+3 laps	
15	T. D. Sloan	Norton	23	+4 laps	
16	W. Robertson	Matchless	23	+4 laps	
17	M. Brosnan	BSA	23	+4 laps	
18	H. B. Lowe	BSA	23	+4 laps	
19	S. Williamson	Norton	23	+4 laps	

== 350 cc classification ==
Pos	Rider	Manufacturer	Laps	Time	Points
1	(United Kingdom) Bill Lomas	Moto Guzzi	25	2:03:14.4	8
2	(United Kingdom) Dickie Dale	Moto Guzzi	25	+54.0	6
3	(United Kingdom) John Hartle	Norton	25	+1:11.8	4
4	(United Kingdom) Jack Brett	Norton	25		3
5	(New Zealand) Peter Murphy	AJS	25		2
6	(Australia) Bob Brown	AJS	25		1
7	(West Germany) August Hobl	DKW	25		
8	(United Kingdom) Alan Trow	Norton	24	+1 lap	
9	(United Kingdom) Dave Chadwick	Norton	24	+1 lap	
10	(United Kingdom) Frank Perris	AJS	24	+1 lap	
11	(United Kingdom) Ralph Rensen	Norton	24	+1 lap	
12	(New Zealand) Bob Coleman	AJS	24	+1 lap	
13	H. Grant	BSA	23	+2 laps	
14	(United Kingdom) Tom Turner	Norton	23	+2 laps	
15	S. Murray	Norton	23	+2 laps	
16	G. N. Begg	AJS	22	+3 laps	
17	G. J. Canning	BSA	22	+3 laps	
18	K. W. Swallow	AJS	22	+3 laps	
19	S. Williamson	Norton	22	+3 laps	
20	S. R. Farlow	BSA	22	+3 laps	
21	J. W. Dixon	Velocette	22	+3 laps	
22	H. Plews	AJS	22	+3 laps	
23	J. Jones	BSA	21	+4 laps	
24	S. R. Cameron	AJS	21	+4 laps	
25	L. Rice	AJS	20	+5 laps	
26	J. A. Artt	Norton	20	+5 laps	

== 250 cc classification ==
Pos	Rider	Manufacturer	Laps	Time	Points
1	(Switzerland) Luigi Taveri	MV Agusta	13	1:07:02.4	8
2	(United Kingdom) Sammy Miller	NSU	13	+13.6	6
3	(United Kingdom) Arthur Wheeler	Moto Guzzi	13	+3:31.0	4
4	(New Zealand) Bob Coleman	NSU	13		3
5	(United Kingdom) Bill Maddrick	Moto Guzzi	12	+1 lap	2
6	(Switzerland) Maurice Büla	NSU	11	+2 laps	1
7	(United Kingdom) Frank Cope	Norton	11	+2 laps	
8	(United Kingdom) William Dehaney	Velocette	11	+2 laps	

== 125cc classification ==
Pos	Rider	Manufacturer	Laps	Time/Retired	Points
1	(Italy) Carlo Ubbiali	MV Agusta	12	1:05:55.0	8
2	(Italy) Romolo Ferri	Gilera	12	+1:29.4	6
3	(United Kingdom) Bill Webster	MV Agusta	10	+2 laps	4
4	(United Kingdom) Bill Maddrick	MV Agusta	10	+2 laps	3
5	(United Kingdom) Frank Cope	MV Agusta	10	+2 laps	2
7 starters, 5 finishers

== Sidecar classification ==
Pos	Rider	Passenger	Manufacturer	Laps	Time	Points
1	(West Germany) Wilhelm Noll	(West Germany) Fritz Cron	BMW	10	56:24.0	8
2	(United Kingdom) Pip Harris	(United Kingdom) Ray Campbell	Norton	10	+1:01.4	6
3	(Switzerland) Florian Camathias	(Switzerland) Maurice Büla	BMW	10	+1:15.6	4
4	(United Kingdom) Frank Taylor	(United Kingdom) Ron Taylor	Norton	10		3
5	(United Kingdom) Bill Beevers	(United Kingdom) Jeff Mundy	Norton	10		2
6	(Belgium) Jack Wijns	(United Kingdom) Mick Woollett	BMW	9	+1 lap	1

Previous race: 1956 German Grand Prix	FIM Grand Prix World Championship; 1956 season	Next race: 1956 Nations Grand Prix
Previous race: 1955 Ulster Grand Prix	Ulster Grand Prix	Next race: 1957 Ulster Grand Prix
