= Carlo Ubbiali =

Italian motorcycle racer (1929–2020)

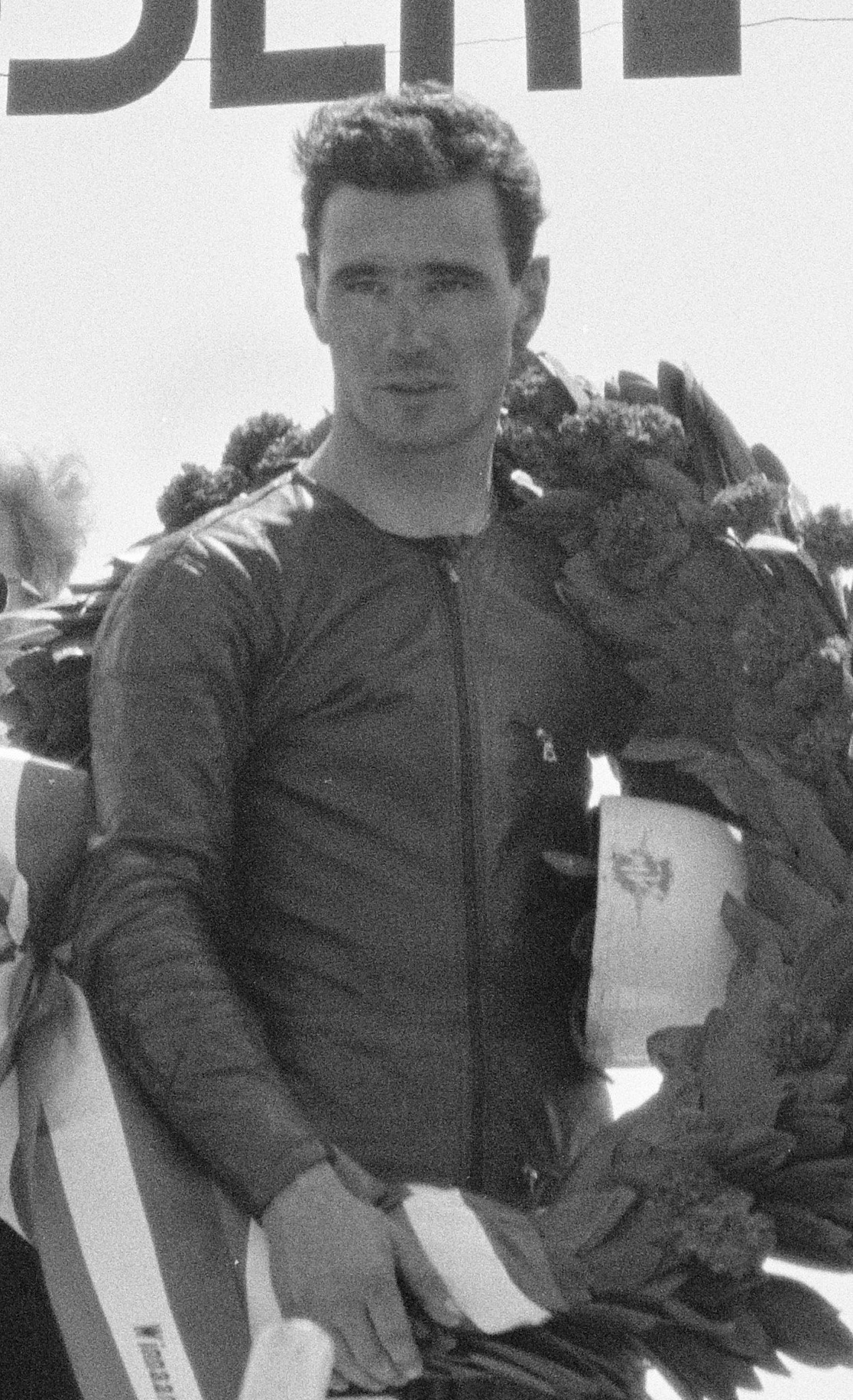
- Ubbiali in 1960
- Nationality: Italian
- Born: 22 September 1929; Bergamo, Italy
- Died: 2 June 2020 (aged 90); Bergamo, Italy
Motorcycle racing career statistics
Grand Prix motorcycle racing
Active years	1949–1960
First race	1949 125cc Swiss Grand Prix
Last race	1960 125cc Nations Grand Prix
First win	1950 125cc Ulster Grand Prix
Last win	1960 125cc Nations Grand Prix
Team(s)	Mondial, MV Agusta
Championships	125cc – 1951, 1955, 1956, 1958–1960 250cc – 1956, 1959, 1960
Starts / Wins / Podiums / Poles / F. laps / Points; 71 / 39 / 68 / N/A / 30 / 403

Carlo Ubbiali (22 September 1929 – 2 June 2020) was an Italian professional motorcycle road racer. He competed in the FIM Grand Prix motorcycle racing world championships from 1949 to 1960, most prominently as a member of the MV Agusta factory racing team. In the 1950s, he was a dominant force in the smaller classes of Grand Prix motorcycle racing, winning six 125cc and three 250cc world titles. In 2001, the F.I.M. inducted Ubbiali into the MotoGP Hall of Fame.

== Career ==
Ubbiali was born in Bergamo, Lombardy. In 1949, the first year of Grand Prix motorcycle racing, he finished in fourth place in the 125cc class riding an MV Agusta. That year, he also won a gold medal in the International Six Days Trial. He switched to Mondial for the 1950 season, and the following year won his first world championship for Mondial in 1951.

After losing his crown to Cecil Sandford in 1952, Ubbiali re-signed with MV Agusta. He went on to become their top rider, winning six 125cc titles and three 250cc crowns and scoring double championships in 1956, 1959, and 1960. Ubbiali was also a five-time winner at the prestigious Isle of Man TT races. He rarely made a mistake while competing, as evidenced by the fact that he never suffered a serious crash during his 12-year Grand Prix career.

Ubbiali retired at the age of 30 while still in his prime. Until the motorcycle racing career of Giacomo Agostini, he was considered Italy's greatest motorcycle racer. His record of nine World Championships stood until 1971 when Agostini won his tenth World Championship. His nine titles tie him with Mike Hailwood and Valentino Rossi for third place on the championship win list behind only Agostini and Ángel Nieto.

In 2001, the F.I.M. inducted Ubbiali into the MotoGP Hall of Fame. In 2019, he received the Coni Golden Collar award.

Ubbiali died on 2 June 2020. By the time of his death, he was the last surviving rider from the first season of Grand Prix motorcycle racing.

== Motorcycle Grand Prix results ==
1949 points system:

Position	1	2	3	4	5	Fastest lap
Points	10	8	7	6	5	1

Points system from 1950 to 1968:

Position	1	2	3	4	5	6
Points	8	6	4	3	2	1

(key) (Races in italics indicate fastest lap)

Year	Class	Team	1	2	3	4	5	6	7	Points	Rank	Wins
1949	125cc	MV Agusta	SUI; 4	NED; 3	NAT -					13	4th	0
1950	125cc	Mondial	NED -	ULS; 1	NAT; 2					14	2nd	1
1951	125cc	Mondial	ESP; 2	IOM; 2	NED -	ULS -	NAT; 1			20	1st	1
1952	125cc	Mondial	IOM; 2	NED; 2	GER; 2	ULS -	NAT; 2	ESP -		24	2nd	0
1953	125cc	MV Agusta	IOM; NC	NED; 2	GER; 1	ULS -	NAT; 3	ESP -		18	3rd	1
1954	125cc	MV Agusta	IOM; 2	ULS -	NED; 3	GER; 3	NAT; 3	ESP -		18	2nd	0
1955	125cc	MV Agusta	ESP; 3	FRA; 1	IOM; 1	GER; 1	NED; 1		NAT; 1	32	1st	5
1955	250cc	MV Agusta			IOM -	GER -	NED -	ULS -	NAT; 1	8	7th	1
1956	125cc	MV Agusta	IOM; 1	NED; 1	BEL; 1	GER; 2	ULS; 1	NAT; 1		32	1st	5
1956	250cc	MV Agusta	IOM; 1	NED; 1	BEL; 1	GER; 1	ULS -	NAT; 1		32	1st	5
1957	125cc	MV Agusta	GER; 1	IOM; 2	NED -	BEL -	ULS -	NAT; 1		22	3rd	2
1957	250cc	MV Agusta	GER; 1	IOM; NC	NED -	BEL -	ULS -	NAT -		8	5th	1
1958	125cc	MV Agusta	IOM; 1	NED; 1	BEL; 5	GER; 1	SWE; 3	ULS; 1	NAT -	32	1st	4
1958	250cc	MV Agusta	IOM; 2	NED; 2	BEL -	GER -	SWE -	ULS -	NAT; 3	16	3rd	0
1959	125cc	MV Agusta	IOM; 5	GER; 1	NED; 1	BEL; 1	SWE; 2	ULS -	NAT; 2	30	1st	3
1959	250cc	MV Agusta	IOM; 2	GER; 1	NED; 2	BEL -	SWE; 2	ULS -	NAT; 1	28	1st	2
1960	125cc	MV Agusta	IOM; 1	NED; 1	BEL; 3		ULS; 1	NAT; 1		24	1st	4
1960	250cc	MV Agusta	IOM; 2	NED; 1	BEL; 1	GER; 2	ULS; 1	NAT; 1		32	1st	4
