= 1956 Grand Prix motorcycle racing season =

Sports season

1956 F.I.M. Grand Prix motorcycle racing season

Seasons
- ← 1955 1957 →

Bill Lomas (left) and John Surtees (right), the 1956 350cc and 500cc World Champion respectively.

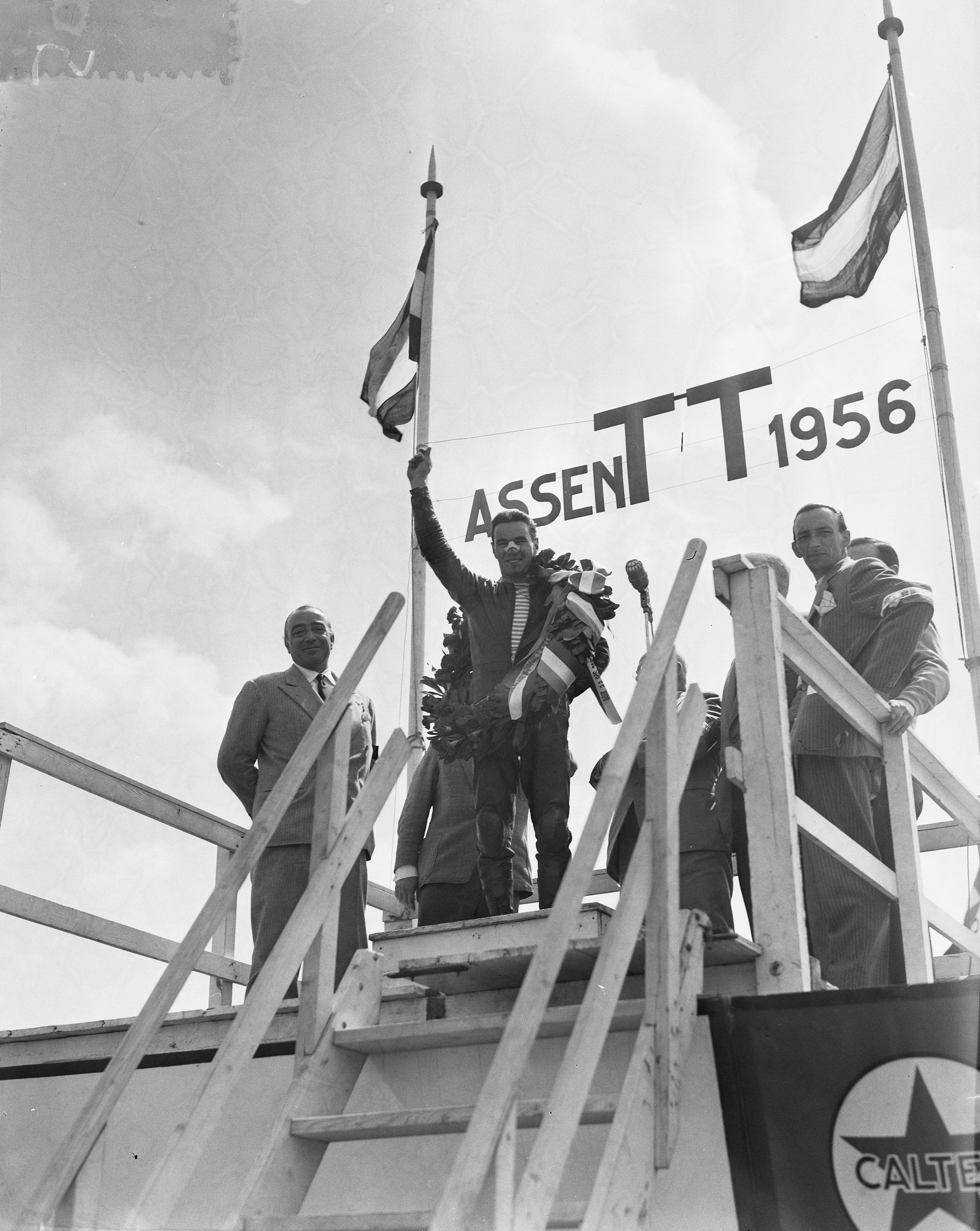
Carlo Ubbiali, the 1956 125cc and 250cc World Champion.

The 1956 Grand Prix motorcycle racing season was the eighth F.I.M. Road Racing World Championship Grand Prix season. The season consisted of six Grand Prix races in five classes: 500cc, 350cc, 250cc, 125cc and Sidecars 500cc. It began on 8 June, with Isle of Man TT and ended with Nations Grand Prix in Italy on 9 September.

Reigning 500cc champion Geoff Duke had to serve a six months ban at the start of the season for supporting a strike by privateer riders over starting money at the 1955 Dutch TT.

== 1956 Grand Prix season calendar ==
Round	Date	Grand Prix	Circuit	125cc winner	250cc winner	350cc winner	500cc winner	Sidecars 500cc winner	Report
1	8 June	Isle of Man TT	Snaefell Mountain	(Italy) Carlo Ubbiali	(Italy) Carlo Ubbiali	(Australia) Ken Kavanagh	(United Kingdom) John Surtees	(West Germany) Hillebrand / Grunwald	Report
2	30 June	(Netherlands) Dutch TT	TT Circuit Assen	(Italy) Carlo Ubbiali	(Italy) Carlo Ubbiali	(United Kingdom) Bill Lomas	(United Kingdom) John Surtees	(West Germany) Hillebrand / Grunwald	Report
3	8 July	(Belgium) Belgian Grand Prix	Spa-Francorchamps	(Italy) Carlo Ubbiali	(Italy) Carlo Ubbiali	(United Kingdom) John Surtees	(United Kingdom) John Surtees	(West Germany) Noll / Cron	Report
4	22 July	(West Germany) German Grand Prix	Solitude	(Italy) Romolo Ferri	(Italy) Carlo Ubbiali	(United Kingdom) Bill Lomas	(Republic of Ireland) Reg Armstrong	(West Germany) Noll / Cron	Report
5	11 August	(Northern Ireland) Ulster Grand Prix	Dundrod Circuit	(Italy) Carlo Ubbiali	(Switzerland) Luigi Taveri	(United Kingdom) Bill Lomas	(United Kingdom) John Hartle	(West Germany) Noll / Cron	Report
6	9 September	(Italy) Nations Grand Prix	Monza	(Italy) Carlo Ubbiali	(Italy) Carlo Ubbiali	(Italy) Libero Liberati	(United Kingdom) Geoff Duke	(Italy) Milani / Milani	Report

== Standings ==
=== Scoring system ===
Points were awarded to the top six finishers in each race. Only the four best races were counted in all five classes: the Sidecars, 125cc, 250cc, 350cc and 500cc championships.

Position	1st	2nd	3rd	4th	5th	6th
Points	8	6	4	3	2	1

==== 500cc final standings ====
Pos	Rider	Machine	MAN (United Kingdom)	HOL (Netherlands)	BEL (Belgium)	GER (Germany)	ULS (Ulster)	NAC (Italy)	Pts
1	(United Kingdom) John Surtees	MV Agusta	1	1	1				24
2	(Germany) Walter Zeller	BMW	4	2	2	Ret	Ret	6	16
3	(United Kingdom) John Hartle	Norton	2				1		14
4	(France) Pierre Monneret	Gilera			3	3		3	12
5	(Republic of Ireland) Reg Armstrong	Gilera			Ret	1	Ret	4	11
6	(Italy) Umberto Masetti	MV Agusta	DNS	Ret	4	2		Ret	9
7	(United Kingdom) Geoff Duke	Gilera			Ret	Ret	Ret	1	8
8	(Australia) Bob Brown	Matchless			Ret		2		6
9	(Italy) Libero Liberati	Gilera						2	6
10	(South Africa) Eddie Grant	Norton	37	3	11	5			6
11	(United Kingdom) Jack Brett	Norton	3				6		5
12	(New Zealand) Peter Murphy	Matchless	Ret				3		4
13	(Australia) Keith Bryen	Norton	Ret	4	10	6			4
14	(Austria) Gerold Klinger	BMW				4		9	3
15	(United Kingdom) Geoffrey Tanner	Norton	Ret				4		3
16	(Italy) Alfredo Milani	Gilera			5			8	2
17	(United Kingdom) Bill Lomas	Moto Guzzi	5	Ret	Ret	Ret	Ret		2
18	(New Zealand) Paul Fahey	Matchless	Ret	5	Ret	Ret			2
19	(Italy) Carlo Bandirola	MV Agusta						5	2
=	(Northern Ireland) Wilf Herron	Norton					5		2
21	(Germany) Ernst Hiller	BMW		6		8		10	1
22	(Isle of Man) Derek Ennett	Matchless	6						1
=	(Belgium) Auguste Goffin	Norton			6				1
24	(United Kingdom) Alan Trow	Norton	7				9		0
25	(Canada) Gerald Robarts	Norton	15	7					0
26	(Australia) Barry Hodgkinson	Norton	22	Ret	7	Ret			0
27	(Germany) Alois Huber	BMW RS				7		Ret	0
28	(Northern Ireland) Austin Carson	Norton					7		0
=	(Italy) Roberto Colombo	MV Agusta						7	0
30	(United Kingdom) John Storr	Norton			8	Ret		12	0
31	(United Kingdom) Dave Chadwick	Norton	23				8		0
32	(Netherlands) Piet Bakker	Norton		8					0
=	(New Zealand) Gavin Dunlop	Matchless	8						0
34	(Isle of Man) Jackie Wood	Velocette / Norton	24		Ret	9		Ret	0
35	(Northern Ireland) Bob Matthews	Norton			9	Ret			0
36	(Netherlands) Priem Rozenberg	BMW		9					0
=	(United Kingdom) George Salt	Norton	9						0
38	(United Kingdom) Dennis Chapman	Norton	10				11		0
39	(New Zealand) Frederick Cook	Matchless	18	10	13	17			0
40	(Northern Ireland) Angus Martin	Matchless	Ret				10		0
41	(France) Jacques Collot	Norton Manx				10		Ret	0
42	(Germany) Ernst Riedelbauch	BMW			Ret	11		11	0
43	(United Kingdom) Ralph Rensen	Norton	11				13		0
44	(Netherlands) Casper Swart	Norton		11					0
45	(Gibraltar) John Grace	Norton	Ret	Ret	12				0
=	(Germany) Hans-Günther Jäger	Norton		Ret	Ret	12			0
47	(United Kingdom) Stephen Murray	Norton					12		0
=	(Northern Ireland) Mike O'Rourke	Norton	12						0
49	(Italy) Giuseppe Cantoni	MV Agusta						13	0
=	(Isle of Man) George Costain	Norton	13						0
=	(Germany) Peter Knees	BMW				13			0
52	(Wales) Frank Perris	Matchless	14				Ret		0
53	(Republic of Ireland) Michael Roche	Norton	DNS		14				0
=	(Germany) Hans-Joachim Scheel	Norton				14			0
=	(Northern Ireland) Harry Turner	Norton					14		0
56	(Sweden) Ulf Gate	Norton				15			0
=	(Belgium) Pierre Nicholas	Norton			15				0
=	(United Kingdom) Des Sloan	Norton			15				0
59	(Isle of Man) Frank Fox	Norton	16						0
=	(United Kingdom) Bill Roberton	Matchless					16		0
=	(Germany) Berthold Sieler	Norton				16			0
62	(Northern Ireland) Martin Brosnan	BSA					17		0
=	(United Kingdom) Harry Plews	Norton	17						0
64	(United Kingdom) Harry Lowe	BSA	41				18		0
=	(Germany) Karl-Heinz Scheifel	Norton				18			0
66	(Northern Ireland) Phil Carter	Norton	19						0
=	(Northern Ireland) Stanley Williamson	Norton					19		0
68	(United Kingdom) Denis Christian	Matchless	20						0
69	(Guernsey) Ken Tostevin	Matchless	21	Ret					0
70	(United Kingdom) Ken Tully	Norton	25						0
71	(Northern Ireland) Bob Ferguson	Matchless	26						0
72	(United Kingdom) Louis Carr	Matchless	27						0
73	(United Kingdom) Brian Duffy	Norton	28				Ret		0
74	(United Kingdom) Albert Moule	Norton	29						0
75	(Australia) Dick Thomson	Matchless	30			Ret			0
76	(United Kingdom) Llewelyn Ranson	Norton	31						0
77	(East Africa Protectorate) Vic Preston	Norton	32						0
78	(United Kingdom) Bill Beevers	Norton	33						0
79	(United Kingdom) Ken Willis	Norton	34						0
80	(South Africa) James Edwards	Norton	35						0
81	(New Zealand) George Begg	AJS	36				Ret		0
82	(United Kingdom) Joe Glazebrook	Norton	38						0
83	(Colombia) E. Barona	Norton	39						0
84	(United Kingdom) Walter Hancock	BSA	40						0
85	(New Zealand) Stan Cameron	AJS	42						0
86	(Dominion of Ceylon) Ralph Wijesinghe	BSA	43						0
87	(United Kingdom) Roly Capner	BSA	44						0
88	(United Kingdom) John Denton	Norton	45						0
-	(Australia) Keith Campbell	Norton / Moto Guzzi			Ret	Ret		Ret	0
-	(Germany) Günther Borgesdiek	Norton			Ret	Ret			0
-	(New Zealand) Robert Coleman	Norton				Ret	Ret		0
-	(Spain) Francisco González	Norton	Ret	Ret					0
-	(Australia) Ken Kavanagh	Moto Guzzi	DNS	Ret	Ret	DNS			0
-	(Sweden) Olle Nygren	Matchless	Ret					Ret	0
-	(Netherlands) Leen Reehorst	Jawa		Ret	Ret				0
-	(Netherlands) Martinus van Son	Matchless		Ret				Ret	0
-	(Sweden) Sven Andersson	Norton				Ret			0
-	(France) Jean-Pierre Bayle	Norton						Ret	0
-	(Belgium) Raymond Bogaerdt	Norton			Ret				0
-	(Germany) Buno Böhrer	Horex				Ret			0
-	(Italy) Paolo Campanelli	Gilera						Ret	0
-	(United Kingdom) George Catlin	Norton	Ret						0
-	(Italy) Artemio Cirelli	Gilera						Ret	0
-	(United Kingdom) John Clark	Matchless	Ret						0
-	(New Zealand) Robert Cook	BSA	Ret						0
-	(United Kingdom) Ronald Cousins	Norton	Ret						0
-	(United Kingdom) Dickie Dale	Moto Guzzi	Ret						0
-	(Belgium) Firmin Dawue	Norton			Ret				0
-	(Italy) Gerardo Düring	Matchless						Ret	0
-	(Netherlands) Anton Elbersen	Matchless		Ret					0
-	(Germany) Karl-Heinz Ewig	Norton				Ret			0
-	(United Kingdom) Ray Fay	BSA	Ret						0
-	(United Kingdom) Robin Fitton	Norton					Ret		0
-	(United Kingdom) Brian Freestone	Norton	Ret						0
-	(Italy) Enrico Galante	Norton						Ret	0
-	(Italy) Martino Giani	Gilera						Ret	0
-	(Italy) Francesco Guglielminetti	Norton						Ret	0
-	(United Kingdom) William Hall	Norton						Ret	0
-	(Czech Republic) Gustav Havel	Jawa		Ret					0
-	(Czech Republic) Frantisek Helikar	Jawa		Ret					0
-	(Australia) Eric Hinton	Norton	DNS			Ret			0
-	(Netherlands) Jaap Iesberts	Matchless		Ret					0
-	(United Kingdom) Roy Ingram	BSA	Ret						0
-	(United Kingdom) Arnold Jones	Matchless	Ret						0
-	(Netherlands) Kees Koster	Norton		Ret					0
-	(United Kingdom) George Leigh	Norton	Ret						0
=	(Canada) Ivor Lloyd	Norton	Ret						0
=	(Italy) Giuseppe Mantelli	Gilera						Ret	0
-	(Northern Ireland) Robert McCracken	Norton					Ret		0
-	(United Kingdom) Bob McIntyre	Norton	Ret						0
-	(Belgium) Jules Nies	Norton			Ret				0
-	(United Kingdom) Frank Norris	Norton	Ret						0
-	(Northern Ireland) Ernie Oliver	Norton					Ret		0
-	(Italy) Sergio Pinza	Moto Guzzi						Ret	0
-	(United Kingdom) Maurice Pizzey	Norton	Ret						0
-	(United Kingdom) Derek Powell	Matchless	Ret						0
-	(United Kingdom) Charlie Salt	BSA	Ret						0
-	(United Kingdom) Brian Setchell	AJS	Ret						0
-	(United Kingdom) Terry Shepherd	Norton	Ret						0
-	(Netherlands) Lodewijk Simons	Norton		Ret					0
-	(Czech Republic) František Šťastný	Jawa		Ret					0
-	(United Kingdom) Ken Swallow	Matchless					Ret		0
-	(Netherlands) Gerrit Ten Kate	Norton		Ret					0
-	(United Kingdom) Gerry Turner	Pike-BSA	Ret						0
-	(Netherlands) Drikus Veer	Jawa		Ret					0
-	(Canada) John Waring	Norton	Ret						0
-	(United Kingdom) Arthur Wheeler	Moto Guzzi					Ret		0
-	(India) Jack Wilks	BSA	Ret						0
-	(United Kingdom) Trevor Williams	Norton	Ret						0
-	(New Zealand) Len Aislabie	Norton	DNS						0
-	(New Zealand) Rod Coleman	Norton	DNS						0
-	(United Kingdom) Robert King	Norton	DNS						0
-	(United Kingdom) Derek Minter	BSA	DNS						0
-	(Morocco) E. Muñoz	Norton	DNS						0
-	(Morocco) M. Muñoz	Norton	DNS						0
-	(United Kingdom) George Northwood	BSA	DNS						0
-	(United Kingdom) Tony Ovens	Norton	DNS						0
-	(Canada) H. Wieland	Norton	DNS						0
-	(Republic of Ireland) J. Woods	Norton	DNS						0
Pos	Rider	Bike	MAN (United Kingdom)	HOL (Netherlands)	BEL (Belgium)	GER (Germany)	ULS (Ulster)	NAC (Italy)	Pts

Colour	Result
Gold	Winner
Silver	Second place
Bronze	Third place
Green	Points classification
Blue	Non-points classification
Blue	Non-classified finish (NC)
Purple	Retired, not classified (Ret)
Red	Did not qualify (DNQ)
Red	Did not pre-qualify (DNPQ)
Black	Disqualified (DSQ)
White	Did not start (DNS)
White	Withdrew (WD)
White	Race cancelled (C)
Blank	Did not practice (DNP)
Blank	Did not arrive (DNA)
Blank	Excluded (EX)

**Bold** – Pole
Italics – Fastest Lap

=== 350cc Standings ===
Place	Rider	Number	Country	Machine	Points	Wins
1	(United Kingdom) Bill Lomas		United Kingdom	Moto Guzzi	24	3
2	(United Kingdom) Dickie Dale		United Kingdom	Moto Guzzi	17	0
=	(West Germany) August Hobl		Germany	DKW	17	0
4	(United Kingdom) John Surtees		United Kingdom	MV Agusta	14	1
5	(United Kingdom) Cecil Sandford		United Kingdom	DKW	13	0
6	(Australia) Ken Kavanagh		Australia	Moto Guzzi	10	1
7	(Italy) Libero Liberati		Italy	Gilera	8	1
8	(United Kingdom) John Hartle		United Kingdom	Norton	8	0
9	(United Kingdom) Derek Ennett		United Kingdom	AJS	6	0
10	(West Germany) Karl Hofmann		Germany	DKW	6	0
11	(Italy) Roberto Colombo		Italy	MV Agusta	4	0
12	(United Kingdom) Jack Brett		United Kingdom	Norton	3	0
13	(Netherlands) Hans Bartl		Netherlands	DKW	3	0
14	(Italy) Umberto Masetti		Italy	MV Agusta	2	0
=	(New Zealand) Peter Murphy		New Zealand	AJS	2	0
=	(South Africa) Eddie Grant		South Africa	Norton	2	0
17	(Australia) Bob Brown		Australia	AJS	1	0
=	(United Kingdom) Bob Matthews		United Kingdom	Norton	1	0
=	(United Kingdom) Alan Trow		United Kingdom	Norton	1	0

=== 250cc Standings ===
Place	Rider	Number	Country	Machine	Points	Wins
1	(Italy) Carlo Ubbiali		Italy	MV Agusta	32	5
2	(Switzerland) Luigi Taveri		Switzerland	MV Agusta	26	1
3	(Italy) Enrico Lorenzetti		Italy	Moto Guzzi	10	0
4	(Italy) Roberto Colombo		Italy	MV Agusta	9	0
=	(West Germany) Horst Kassner		Germany	NSU	9	0
6	(Italy) Remo Venturi		Italy	MV Agusta	8	0
7	(United Kingdom) Sammy Miller		United Kingdom	NSU	7	0
8	(West Germany) Hans Baltisberger		Germany	NSU	7	0
9	(United Kingdom) Arthur Wheeler		United Kingdom	Moto Guzzi	5	0
10	(New Zealand) Bob Coleman		New Zealand	NSU	3	0
=	(Netherlands) Kees Koster		Netherlands	NSU	3	0
12	(Czechoslovakia) František Bartoš		Czechoslovakia	ČZ	2	0
=	(United Kingdom) Bill Maddrick		United Kingdom	Moto Guzzi	2	0
=	(Netherlands) Lo Simons		Netherlands	NSU	2	0
=	(Italy) Alano Montanari		Italy	Moto Guzzi	2	0
=	(Australia) Bob Brown		Australia	NSU	2	0
17	(France) Jean-Pierre Bayle		France	NSU	1	0
=	(Switzerland) Maurice Büla		Switzerland	NSU	1	0
=	(West Germany) Roland Heck		Germany	NSU	1	0
=	(Czechoslovakia) Jiří Koštíř		Czechoslovakia	ČZ	1	0

=== 125cc ===
==== Riders' standings ====
Pos.	Rider	Bike	MAN (United Kingdom)	NED (Netherlands)	BEL (Belgium)	GER (Germany)	ULS (Ulster)	NAT (Italy)	Pts
1	(Italy) Carlo Ubbiali	MV Agusta	1**^{F}**	1**^{F}**	1	2	1**^{F}**	1	32 (46)
2	(Italy) Romolo Ferri	Gilera			NC**^{F}**	1	2		14
3	(Switzerland) Luigi Taveri	MV Agusta		2	4			4	12
4	(Italy) Tarquinio Provini	Mondial				3		2**^{F}**	10
5	(Italy) Fortunato Libanori	MV Agusta			2	4			9
6	(Spain) Marcelo Cama	Montesa	2						6
7	(West Germany) August Hobl	DKW		3		5			6
8	(West Germany) Karl Hofmann	DKW		5	5			6	5
9	(Spain) Francisco Gonzalez	Montesa	3						4
9	(France) Pierre Monneret	Gilera			3				4
9	(United Kingdom) Bill Webster	MV Agusta					3		4
9	(Italy) Renato Sartori	Mondial						3	4
13	(United Kingdom) Cecil Sandford	Mondial		4		6			4
14	(Spain) Enrico Sirera	Montesa	4						3
14	(United Kingdom) Bill Maddrick	MV Agusta					4		3
16	(United Kingdom) Dave Chadwick	LEF	5						2
16	(United Kingdom) Frank Cope	MV Agusta					5		2
16	(Italy) Sandro Artusi	Ducati						5	2
19	(Czechoslovakia) Vaclav Parus	ČZ	6						1
19	(Czechoslovakia) František Bartoš	ČZ		6					1
19	(Gibraltar) Johnny Grace	Montesa			6				1
Pos.	Rider	Bike	ESP (Spain)	FRA (France)	MAN (United Kingdom)	GER (Germany)	NED (Netherlands)	NAT (Italy)	Pts

Race key
Colour	Result
Gold	Winner
Silver	2nd place
Bronze	3rd place
Green	Points finish
Blue	Non-points finish
Blue	Non-classified finish (NC)
Purple	Retired (Ret)
Red	Did not qualify (DNQ)
Black	Disqualified (DSQ)
White	Did not start (DNS)
White	Withdrew (WD)
White	Race cancelled (C)
Blank	Did not practice (DNP)
Blank	Excluded (EX)
Blank	Did not arrive (DNA)
Blank	Did not enter (empty cell)
Annotation	Meaning
P	Pole position
F	Fastest lap
Rider key
Colour	Meaning
Light blue	Rookie rider

==== Constructors' standings ====
Each constructor is awarded the same number of points as their best placed rider in each race.

Pos.	Constructor	MAN (United Kingdom)	NED (Netherlands)	BEL (Belgium)	GER (Germany)	ULS (Ulster)	NAT (Italy)	Pts
1	(Italy) MV Agusta	1	1	1	2	1	1	32 (46)
2	(Italy) Gilera			3	1	2		18
3	(Italy) Mondial		4		3		2	13
4	(West Germany) DKW		3	5	5		6	9
5	(Spain) Montesa	2		6				7
6	LEF	5						2
6	(Italy) Ducati						5	2
8	(Czechoslovakia) ČZ	6	6					2
Pos.	Constructor	MAN (United Kingdom)	NED (Netherlands)	BEL (Belgium)	GER (Germany)	ULS (Ulster)	NAT (Italy)	Pts
