= Horst Kassner =

German motorcycle racer (1937–2019)

- Nationality: German
Motorcycle racing career statistics
Grand Prix motorcycle racing
Active years	1956, 1958 – 1959
First race	1956 250cc Isle of Man Lightweight TT
Last race	1959 250cc Isle of Man Lightweight TT
Team	NSU
Starts / Wins / Podiums / Poles / F. laps / Points; 9 / 0 / 2 / N/A / N/A / 12

Horst Kassner (12 May 1937 – 21 April 2019) was a Grand Prix motorcycle road racer from Germany. His best year was in 1956 when he finished the season in fourth place in the 250cc world championship.
