= Alano Montanari =

Italian motorcycle racer

- Nationality: Italian
Motorcycle racing career statistics
Grand Prix motorcycle racing
Active years	1950 - 1954, 1956 - 1957,
First race	1950 250cc Nations Grand Prix
Last race	1957 350cc Belgian Grand Prix
Team	Moto Guzzi
Starts / Wins / Podiums / Poles / F. laps / Points; 13 / 0 / 3 / N/A / N/A / 39

Alano Montanari was an Italian Grand Prix motorcycle road racer.

== Career ==
Although he had participated in various World Cup races following 1949, in the 1953 Grand Prix motorcycle racing season, Montanari finished competed in the full season, achieved three podiums, and finished fifth overall in the 250cc world championship. He also won the Shell Cup in Imola in the 250cc category. During these years, he and Enrico Lorenzetti became very good friends.

With a 350cc single cylinder Moto Guzzi, Montanari achieved the Italian speed record title at the age of 49.

Montanari finished his career in 1958 at the age of 50, but couldn’t enjoy his retirement too long.

Unfortunately, Montanari contracted an infection during an accident, which was left untreated and he died on August 17 the same year.
