= 1957 Grand Prix motorcycle racing season =

Sports season

1957 F.I.M. Grand Prix motorcycle racing season

Seasons
- ← 1956 1958 →

The 1957 Grand Prix motorcycle racing season was the ninth F.I.M. Road Racing World Championship Grand Prix season. The season consisted of six Grand Prix races in five classes: 500cc, 350cc, 250cc, 125cc and Sidecars 500cc. It began on 19 May, with German Grand Prix and ended with Nations Grand Prix in Italy on 1 September.

== Season summary ==
1957 marked the end of an era in Grand Prix motorcycle racing. There had been a variety of machinery competing during the 1950s including works teams from AJS, Norton, Gilera, MV Agusta, Moto Guzzi and BMW. They used singles, twins and four-cylinder machines including privateer Nortons and Matchless.

The Italian firms dropped a bombshell by announcing they would pull out of racing at the conclusion of the 1957 season, citing escalating costs and dwindling motorcycle sales. MV Agusta initially went along with the pull out before reconsidering. The firm would go on to claim 17 consecutive 500cc crowns.

1957 would also mark a new era in other respects with the banning of the dustbin fairings due to their dangerous instability in crosswinds. Another harbinger of change was the introduction of two-stroke engines in competition. An East German firm named MZ placed respectably in races at the Nürburgring although few people viewed the two-strokes as a threat to the mighty four-strokes.

== 1957 Grand Prix season calendar ==
Round	Date	Grand Prix	Circuit	125cc winner	250cc winner	350cc winner	500cc winner	Sidecars 500cc winner	Report
1	19 May	(Germany) German Grand Prix	Hockenheimring	(Italy) Carlo Ubbiali	(Italy) Carlo Ubbiali	(Italy) Libero Liberati	(Italy) Libero Liberati	(Germany) Hillebrand / Grunwald	Report
2	7 June	Isle of Man TT	Snaefell Mountain	(Italy) Tarquinio Provini	(United Kingdom) Cecil Sandford	(United Kingdom) Bob McIntyre	(United Kingdom) Bob McIntyre	(Germany) Hillebrand / Grunwald	Report
3	29 June	(Netherlands) Dutch TT	TT Circuit Assen	(Italy) Tarquinio Provini	(Italy) Tarquinio Provini	(Australia) Keith Campbell	(United Kingdom) John Surtees	(Germany) Hillebrand / Grunwald	Report
4	7 July	(Belgium) Belgian Grand Prix	Spa-Francorchamps	(Italy) Tarquinio Provini	(United Kingdom) John Hartle	(Australia) Keith Campbell	(Italy) Libero Liberati	(Germany) Schneider / Strauß	Report
5	10 August	(Northern Ireland) Ulster Grand Prix	Dundrod Circuit	(Switzerland) Luigi Taveri	(United Kingdom) Cecil Sandford	(Australia) Keith Campbell	(Italy) Libero Liberati		Report
6	1 September	(Italy) Nations Grand Prix	Monza	(Italy) Carlo Ubbiali	(Italy) Tarquinio Provini	(United Kingdom) Bob McIntyre	(Italy) Libero Liberati	(Italy) Milani / Milani	Report

== Standings ==
=== Scoring system ===
Points were awarded to the top six finishers in each race. Only the four best races were counted in all five classes: the Sidecars, 125cc, 250cc, 350cc and 500cc championships.

Position	1st	2nd	3rd	4th	5th	6th
Points	8	6	4	3	2	1

==== 500cc final standings ====
Pos	Rider	Machine	GER (Germany)	MAN (Isle of Man)	HOL (Netherlands)	BEL (Belgium)	ULS (Northern Ireland)	NAC (Italy)	Pts
1	(Italy) Libero Liberati	Gilera	1		2	**1**	1	1	**32** (38)
2	(United Kingdom) Bob McIntyre	Gilera	2	**1**	Ret		2		**20**
3	(United Kingdom) John Surtees	MV Agusta	Ret	2	1	Ret	Ret	4	**17**
4	(United Kingdom) Geoff Duke	Gilera					3	2	**10**
5	(United Kingdom) Jack Brett	Norton		Ret	4	2	Ret		**9**
6	(Germany) Walter Zeller	BMW	3	Ret	3	Ret			8
7	(Australia) Keith Bryen	Matchless / Norton / Moto Guzzi		13	6	3	5		7
8	(United Kingdom) Dickie Dale	Moto Guzzi	4	4					6
9	(Italy) Alfredo Milani	Gilera				Ret		3	4
10	(Australia) Bob Brown	Gilera		3					**4**
11	(United Kingdom) Terry Shepherd	MV Agusta	5		Ret		6	6	**4**
12	(United Kingdom) Derek Minter	Norton		16	9	4			**3**
13	(United Kingdom) Geoffrey Tanner	Norton		28			4		**3**
14	(Germany) Ernst Hiller	BMW	6		5				**3**
15	(Northern Ireland) Mike O'Rourke	Norton		29	10	5			**2**
16	(Australia) Keith Campbell	Moto Guzzi	Ret	5	Ret	Ret	Ret		**2**
=	(Italy) Umberto Masetti	MV Agusta	Ret		Ret			5	**2**
18	(Germany) Hans-Günter Jäger	Norton / BMW	13		Ret	6		13	**1**
19	(United Kingdom) Alan Trow	Norton		6					**1**
20	(New Zealand) John Hempleman	Norton		Ret	7	Ret	11		**0**
21	(Italy) Carlo Bandirola	MV Agusta						7	**0**
=	(United Kingdom) Alistair King	Norton		7					**0**
=	(Northern Ireland) Bob Matthews	Norton					7		**0**
=	(Germany) Ernst Riedelbauch	BMW	7						**0**
25	(United Kingdom) Jimmy Buchan Jr.	Norton		9			8		**0**
26	(Australia) Roger Barker	Norton		10	8				**0**
27	(Austria) Gerold Klinger	BMW	Ret		Ret	Ret		8	**0**
28	(Germany) Eugen Hagenlocher	BMW	8						**0**
=	(New Zealand) Peter Murphy	Matchless		8					**0**
30	(Germany) Alois Huber	BMW	9					11	**0**
31	(United Kingdom) John Clark	Moto Guzzi		Ret	Ret	Ret	9		**0**
=	(United Kingdom) John Hartle	Norton			Ret	Ret	Ret	9	**0**
33	(Isle of Man) Jackie Wood	Norton		Ret			10		**0**
34	(Italy) Giuseppe Cantoni	Gilera						10	**0**
35	(Guernsey) Ken Tostevin	Norton	10	18	11				**0**
36	(United Kingdom) Bernard Codd	Norton		11					**0**
=	(France) Jacques Insermini	Norton	11						**0**
38	(United Kingdom) Denis Christian	Matchless		Ret			12		**0**
39	(Northern Ireland) Austin Carson	Norton	12						**0**
=	(United Kingdom) Frank Fox	Norton		12					**0**
=	(Italy) Francesco Guglieminetti	Norton						12	**0**
=	(Netherlands) Priem Rozenberg	BMW			12				**0**
43	(United Kingdom) Fred Wallis	BSA		Ret			13		**0**
44	(Netherlands) Kees Koster	Norton			13				**0**
=	(Italy) Nico Tagli	Gilera						13	**0**
46	(United Kingdom) Ralph Rensen	Norton		Ret			14		**0**
47	(United Kingdom) Peter Davey	Norton		14					**0**
=	(Netherlands) Anton Elbersen	Norton			14				**0**
49	(United Kingdom) Derek Powell	Matchless		Ret			15		**0**
=	(United Kingdom) George Catlin	Norton		15		Ret			**0**
51	(United Kingdom) Vernon Cottle	Norton					16		**0**
52	(United Kingdom) Dennis Chapman	Norton		Ret			17		**0**
53	(Isle of Man) George Costain	Norton		17					**0**
54	(Australia) Dick Thomson	Norton / Matchless	Ret	Ret			18		**0**
55	(United Kingdom) John Denton	Norton		19					**0**
=	(Northern Ireland) Jimmy Jones	Norton					19		**0**
57	(New Zealand) Harry Lowe	BSA		27			20		**0**
58	(New Zealand) John Anderson	Norton		20	Ret	Ret			**0**
59	(United Kingdom) Harry Grant	BSA		Ret			21		**0**
60	(United Kingdom) Louis Carr	Matchless		21					**0**
61	(Northern Ireland) Martin Brosnan	Norton					22		**0**
=	(South Africa) Stan Setaro	Norton		22					**0**
63	(Northern Ireland) Tommy Holmes	BSA					23		**0**
=	(United Kingdom) Arthur Wheeler	Moto Guzzi		23					**0**
65	(United Kingdom) Ray Fay	Norton		24					**0**
=	(Northern Ireland) Jimmy Hayes	AJS					24		**0**
67	(Northern Ireland) Bob Coulter	BSA					25		**0**
=	(United Kingdom) Ken Tully	Norton		25					**0**
69	(Republic of Ireland) M.S. Hall	Norton					26		**0**
=	(United Kingdom) Ken Willis	Norton		26					**0**
71	(United Kingdom) Bill Roberton	Norton		30					**0**
72	(United Kingdom) Roly Capner	Norton		31					**0**
73	(United Kingdom) Ernie Barrett	Norton		32					**0**
74	(United Kingdom) Robert King	Norton		33					**0**
75	(United Kingdom) Arnold Jones	AJS		34					**0**
76	(United Kingdom) Basil King	Norton		35					**0**
77	(United Kingdom) Llewellyn Ranson	Norton		36					**0**
78	(United Kingdom) Bob Rowbottom	Norton		37					**0**
79	(United Kingdom) Joe Glazebrook	AJS		38					**0**
-	(New Zealand) Noel McCutcheon	Norton		Ret	Ret	Ret			**0**
-	(Netherlands) Martinus van Son	Matchless	Ret					Ret	**0**
-	(United States) Andy Aharonian	BSA		Ret					**0**
-	(Sweden) Sven Andersson	Norton						Ret	**0**
-	(Netherlands) Piet Bakker	Norton			Ret				**0**
-	(United Kingdom) John Banks	Norton		Ret					**0**
-	(United Kingdom) Bill Beevers	Norton		Ret					**0**
-	(Belgium) Raymond Bogaerdt	Norton				Ret			**0**
-	(United Kingdom) Joe Brindley	Norton		Ret					**0**
-	(New Zealand) Stan Cameron	AJS		Ret					**0**
-	(Italy) Paolo Campanelli	Gilera						Ret	**0**
-	(Italy) Fabio Ceredi	Moto Guzzi						Ret	**0**
-	(United Kingdom) Dave Chadwick	Norton		Ret					**0**
-	(France) Jacques Collot	Norton	Ret					Ret	**0**
-	(Italy) Giuseppe Colnago	Moto Guzzi				Ret			**0**
-	(United Kingdom) Ronald Cousins	Norton		Ret					**0**
-	(France) René Deschamps	Norton	Ret						**0**
-	(Northern Ireland) Bob Ferguson	Matchless		Ret					**0**
-	(Italy) Enrico Galante	Norton						Ret	**0**
-	(Sweden) Ulf Gate	Norton		Ret					**0**
-	(Italy) Martino Giani	Gilera						Ret	**0**
-	(United Kingdom) Walter Hancock	BSA		Ret					**0**
-	(Australia) Eric Hinton	Norton		Ret					**0**
-	(Germany) Heinz Kauert	Matchless	Ret						**0**
-	(Germany) Rudolf Knees	BMW	Ret						**0**
-	(France) Guy Ligier	Norton	Ret						**0**
-	(United Kingdom) Robert Lilley	Norton		Ret					**0**
-	(Italy) Giuseppe Mantelli	Gilera						Ret	**0**
-	(Germany) Kurt Maul	Norton	Ret						**0**
-	(Northern Ireland) Robert McCracken	Norton					Ret		**0**
-	(United Kingdom) Bernard Morle	Norton		Ret					**0**
-	(United Kingdom) Albert Moule	Norton		Ret					**0**
-	(United Kingdom) Andrew Mustard	BSA		Ret					**0**
-	(Belgium) Pierre Nicholas	Norton				Ret			**0**
-	(Belgium) Jules Nies	Norton				Ret			**0**
-	(United Kingdom) Frank Norris	Norton		Ret					**0**
-	(United Kingdom) George Northwood	Norton		Ret					**0**
-	(United Kingdom) Grenville Pennington	BSA		Ret					**0**
-	(United Kingdom) Harry Plews	Norton		Ret					**0**
-	(United Kingdom) Brian Purslow	Norton		Ret					**0**
-	(United Kingdom) Charlie Salt	BSA		Ret					**0**
-	(United Kingdom) George Salt	Norton		Ret					**0**
-	(Germany) Karl-Heinz Scheifel	Matchless	Ret						**0**
-	(Germany) Toni Schmitz	Norton	Ret						**0**
-	(United Kingdom) Brian Setchell	Norton		Ret					**0**
-	(Netherlands) Casper Swart	Norton			Ret				**0**
-	(United Kingdom) Percy Tait	Norton		Ret					**0**
-	(Canada) Don Tickle	Norton		Ret					**0**
-	(Germany) Hermann Vogt	Matchless	Ret						**0**
-	(United States) Danny Walker	Norton		Ret					**0**
-	(United Kingdom) Trevor Williams	Norton		Ret					**0**
-	(New Zealand) Ian Yeates	Norton		Ret					**0**
-	(Italy) Gianvittorio Ziglioli	Moto Guzzi						Ret	**0**
Pos	Rider	Bike	GER (Germany)	MAN (United Kingdom)	HOL (Netherlands)	BEL (Belgium)	ULS (Ulster)	NAC (Italy)	Pts

Colour	Result
Gold	Winner
Silver	Second place
Bronze	Third place
Green	Points classification
Blue	Non-points classification
Blue	Non-classified finish (NC)
Purple	Retired, not classified (Ret)
Red	Did not qualify (DNQ)
Red	Did not pre-qualify (DNPQ)
Black	Disqualified (DSQ)
White	Did not start (DNS)
White	Withdrew (WD)
White	Race cancelled (C)
Blank	Did not practice (DNP)
Blank	Did not arrive (DNA)
Blank	Excluded (EX)

**Bold** – Pole
Italics – Fastest Lap

=== 1957 350cc Roadracing World Championship final standings ===
Place	Rider	Number	Country	Machine	Points	Wins
1	(Australia) Keith Campbell		Australia	Moto Guzzi	30	3
2	(United Kingdom) Bob McIntyre		United Kingdom	Gilera	22	2
3	(Italy) Libero Liberati	7	Italy	Gilera	22	1
4	(Australia) Keith Bryen		Australia	Moto Guzzi	12	0
5	(United Kingdom) John Hartle	8	United Kingdom	Norton	11	0
6	(Italy) Giuseppe Colnago		Italy	Moto Guzzi	7	0
7	(Australia) Bob Brown	17	Australia	Gilera	6	0
8	(Italy) Alano Montanari	3	Italy	Moto Guzzi	5	0
9	(Germany) Helmut Hallmeier		West Germany	NSU	4	0
10	(United Kingdom) Jack Brett	12	United Kingdom	Norton	3	0
10	(Italy) Umberto Masetti	14	Italy	MV Agusta	3	0
10	(Italy) Alfredo Milani		Italy	Gilera	3	0
10	(United Kingdom) John Surtees	4	United Kingdom	MV Agusta	3	0

=== 1957 250cc Roadracing World Championship final standings ===
Place	Rider	Number	Country	Machine	Points	Wins
1	(United Kingdom) Cecil Sandford	5	United Kingdom	Mondial	26	2
2	(Italy) Tarquinio Provini		Italy	Mondial	16	2
3	(United Kingdom) Sammy Miller	7	United Kingdom	Mondial	14	0
4	(Italy) Roberto Colombo		Italy	MV Agusta	10	0
5	(United Kingdom) John Hartle	8	United Kingdom	MV Agusta	8	1
5	(Italy) Carlo Ubbiali	1	Italy	MV Agusta	8	1
7	(Switzerland) Luigi Taveri	2	Switzerland	MV Agusta	8	0
8	(United Kingdom) Dave Chadwick		United Kingdom	MV Agusta	7	0
9	(Italy) Enrico Lorenzetti		Italy	Moto Guzzi	7	0
10	(Italy) Remo Venturi	6	Italy	MV Agusta	6	0

=== 125cc ===
==== Riders' standings ====
Pos.	Rider	Bike	GER (Germany)	MAN (Isle of Man)	NED (Netherlands)	BEL (Belgium)	ULS (Ulster)	NAT (Italy)	Pts
1	(Italy) Tarquinio Provini	Mondial	2**^{F}**	1**^{F}**	1**^{F}**	1**^{F}**	2**^{F}**		30 (36)
2	(Switzerland) Luigi Taveri	MV Agusta	5	3	3	2	1	3	22 (28)
3	(Italy) Carlo Ubbiali	MV Agusta	1	2				1**^{F}**	22
4	(United Kingdom) Sammy Miller	Mondial		4	6		5	2	12
5	(Italy) Roberto Colombo	MV Agusta	3	6	2				11
6	(United Kingdom) Cecil Sandford	Mondial		5	4	3			9
7	(Italy) Remo Venturi	MV Agusta					3	5	6
8	(Italy) Fortunato Libanori	MV Agusta			5			4	5
9	(East Germany) Horst Fügner	MZ	4						3
9	(Czechoslovakia) František Bartoš	ČZ				4			3
9	(United Kingdom) Dave Chadwick	MV Agusta					4		3
12	(United Kingdom) Bill Webster	MV Agusta				5	6		3
13	(East Germany) Ernst Degner	MZ	6						1
13	(United Kingdom) Bill Maddrick	MV Agusta				6			1
13	(Italy) Guido Sala	Mondial						6	1
Pos.	Rider	Bike	GER (Germany)	MAN (Isle of Man)	NED (Netherlands)	BEL (Belgium)	ULS (Ulster)	NAT (Italy)	Pts

Race key
Colour	Result
Gold	Winner
Silver	2nd place
Bronze	3rd place
Green	Points finish
Blue	Non-points finish
Blue	Non-classified finish (NC)
Purple	Retired (Ret)
Red	Did not qualify (DNQ)
Black	Disqualified (DSQ)
White	Did not start (DNS)
White	Withdrew (WD)
White	Race cancelled (C)
Blank	Did not practice (DNP)
Blank	Excluded (EX)
Blank	Did not arrive (DNA)
Blank	Did not enter (empty cell)
Annotation	Meaning
P	Pole position
F	Fastest lap
Rider key
Colour	Meaning
Light blue	Rookie rider

==== Constructors' standings ====
Each constructor is awarded the same number of points as their best placed rider in each race.

As Mondial and MV Agusta had equal number of points, identical ranks obtained in all races, and equal number of races in which they classified, their finishing time in each of the six races was added up. Mondial's total time (5:20:51.8) is quicker than MV Agusta's total time (5:22:38.1), and was declared the constructors' champion.

Pos.	Constructor	GER (Germany)	MAN (Isle of Man)	NED (Netherlands)	BEL (Belgium)	ULS (Ulster)	NAT (Italy)	Pts
1	(Italy) Mondial	2	1	1	1	2	2	30 (42)
2	(Italy) MV Agusta	1	2	2	2	1	1	30 (42)
3	(East Germany) MZ	4						3
4	(Czechoslovakia) ČZ				4			3
Pos.	Constructor	GER (Germany)	MAN (Isle of Man)	NED (Netherlands)	BEL (Belgium)	ULS (Ulster)	NAT (Italy)	Pts
