= Manliffe Barrington =

Irish motorcycle racer

- Nationality: Irish
- Born: 19 November 1912
- Died: 1999 (aged 86–87)
Motorcycle racing career statistics
Grand Prix motorcycle racing
Active years	1949 - 1951
Team(s)	AJS, Moto Guzzi, Norton, Vincent-HRD
Starts / Wins / Podiums / Poles / F. laps / Points; / 1 / 1 / 0 / 0 / 12
Isle of Man TT career
TTs contested	9 (1935-1938, 1947-1951)
TT wins	2
First TT win	1947 Lightweight TT
Last TT win	1949 Lightweight TT
TT podiums	2

Manliffe Barrington (19 November 1912 – 1999) was an Irish professional motorcycle racer. He was a two-time winner at the Isle of Man TT races.

== Motorcycle racing career ==
Barrington was born in Monkstown, Dublin to an official importer for CAV (a predecessor of Lucas) for tractors in Ireland. He first competed in the 1935 Isle of Man TT on an Excelsior, finishing the Senior TT in 11th place at an average race speed of 72.06 mph. Manliffe also occasionally raced cars including finishing 4th at Phoenix Park in 1937 driving a Rapier.

When motorsports activities resumed following the conclusion of the Second World War, Barrington was entered into the 1947 Isle of Man TT races riding a Moto Guzzi sponsored by former TT champion Stanley Woods. The 250 cc Lightweight TT race was won by Barrington in what proved highly controversial circumstances from teammate Maurice Cann. Despite Cann lapping consistently for the whole race at an average race speed of over 74 mph and Barrington at just over 73 mph, the 1947 250cc Lightweight TT Race was awarded to Barrington. Despite a protest to the ACU, the result was allowed to stand as "....in those days of wind-up watches and hand-written records, the officials had under-estimated Barrington's time by a minute."

The first event of the new 1949 Grand Prix motorcycle racing season was the 1949 Isle of Man TT Race. A further race win for Barrington in the new Grand Prix Championship was the 1949 250 cc Lightweight TT race at an average race speed of 77.99 mph again riding a Moto Guzzi.

During practice for the 1952 Senior TT race, Barrington was riding a 500 cc Norton when engine seizure at the left-hand bend before the Barregarrow cross-roads resulted in a crash, and a broken thigh caused his retirement from motorcycle racing.

== World Championship results ==
(key) (Races in bold indicate pole position; races in italics indicate fastest lap.)

Year	Class	Motorcycle	1	2	3	4	5	6	7	8	Position	Points
1949			IOM	SUI	NED	BEL	ULS	NAT				
1949	250 cc	Moto Guzzi	1								6th	10
1949	350 cc	Norton	18								—	0
1950			IOM	BEL	NED	SUI	ULS	NAT				
1950	350 cc	AJS	39								—	0
1950	500 cc	Vincent-HRD	Ret								—	0
1951			ESP	SUI	IOM	BEL	NED	FRA	ULS	NAT		
1951	350 cc	Norton			17						—	0
1951	500 cc	Norton			5						19th	2

== TT Race Wins ==
Year	Race & Capacity	Motorcycle	Average Speed
1947	Lightweight 250cc	Moto Guzzi	73.22 mph
1949	Lightweight 250cc	Moto Guzzi	77.99 mph

== TT career summary ==
Finishing Position	1st	5th	11th	17th	18th	39th	DNF
Number of times	2	1	1	1	1	1	7

== 1947 Lightweight TT Race Results ==
Rank	Rider	Team	Speed	Time
1	(Republic of Ireland) Manliffe Barington	Moto Guzzi	73.22 mph	3:36.26.6
2	(England) Maurice Cann	Moto Guzzi	72.972	3:37.10.8
3	(England) Ben Drinkwater	Excelsior	70.139	3:34.57.0
