= Maurice Cann =

British motorcycle racer

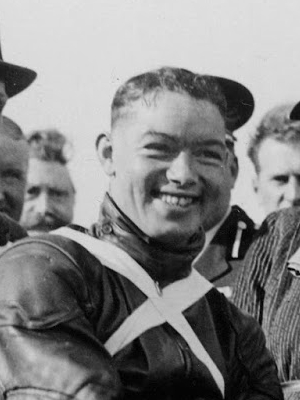
- Cann after winning the 1937 Senior Manx Grand Prix
- Nationality: British
- Born: 23 March 1911
- Died: 12 February 1989 (aged 77)
Motorcycle racing career statistics
Grand Prix motorcycle racing
Active years	1949 - 1953
First race	1949 Ulster Grand Prix
Last race	1953 Isle of Man TT
First win	1949 250cc Ulster Grand Prix
Last win	1952 250cc Ulster Grand Prix
Team(s)	AJS, Moto Guzzi
Championships	0
Starts / Wins / Podiums / Poles / F. laps / Points; / 3 / 5 / 0 / 2 / 41
Isle of Man TT career
TTs contested	7 (1938-1939, 1947-1948, 1950, 1952-1953)
TT wins	1
First TT win	1948 Lightweight TT
Last TT win	1948 Lightweight TT
TT podiums	3

Maurice Cann (23 March 1911 – 12 February 1989) was a British former Grand Prix motorcycle road racer. He entered his first Manx Grand Prix in 1931, and in 1938 competed in his first Isle of Man TT. Cann won the 1948 Lightweight TT aboard a Moto Guzzi. He competed from 1949 to 1952 in the Grand Prix world championships. He won his first time in world championship competition in the 250cc class at the 1949 Ulster Grand Prix, also on a Moto Guzzi.

== World Championship results ==
(key) (Races in bold indicate pole position; races in italics indicate fastest lap.)

Year	Class	Motorcycle	1	2	3	4	5	6	7	8	9	Rank	Points
1949			IOM	SUI	NED	BEL	ULS	NAT					
1949	250 cc	Moto Guzzi					1					4th	11
1950			IOM	BEL	NED	SUI	ULS	NAT					
1950	250 cc	Moto Guzzi	2				1					**2nd**	**14**
1950	350 cc	Moto Guzzi	Ret									—	0
1951			ESP	SUI	IOM	BEL	NED	FRA	ULS	NAT			
1951	250 cc	Moto Guzzi							2			6th	6
1952			SUI	IOM	NED	BEL	GER	ULS	NAT	ESP			
1952	250 cc	Moto Guzzi		5				1				4th	10
1952	350 cc	AJS		Ret								—	0
1953			IOM	NED	BEL	GER	FRA	ULS	SUI	NAT	ESP		
1953	250 cc	Moto Guzzi	Ret									—	0

Sporting positions
Preceded by Bruno Francisci	250cc Motorcycle European Champion; 1948	Succeeded by Herbert Hauf (1981)
