= Artie Bell =

British motorcycle racer

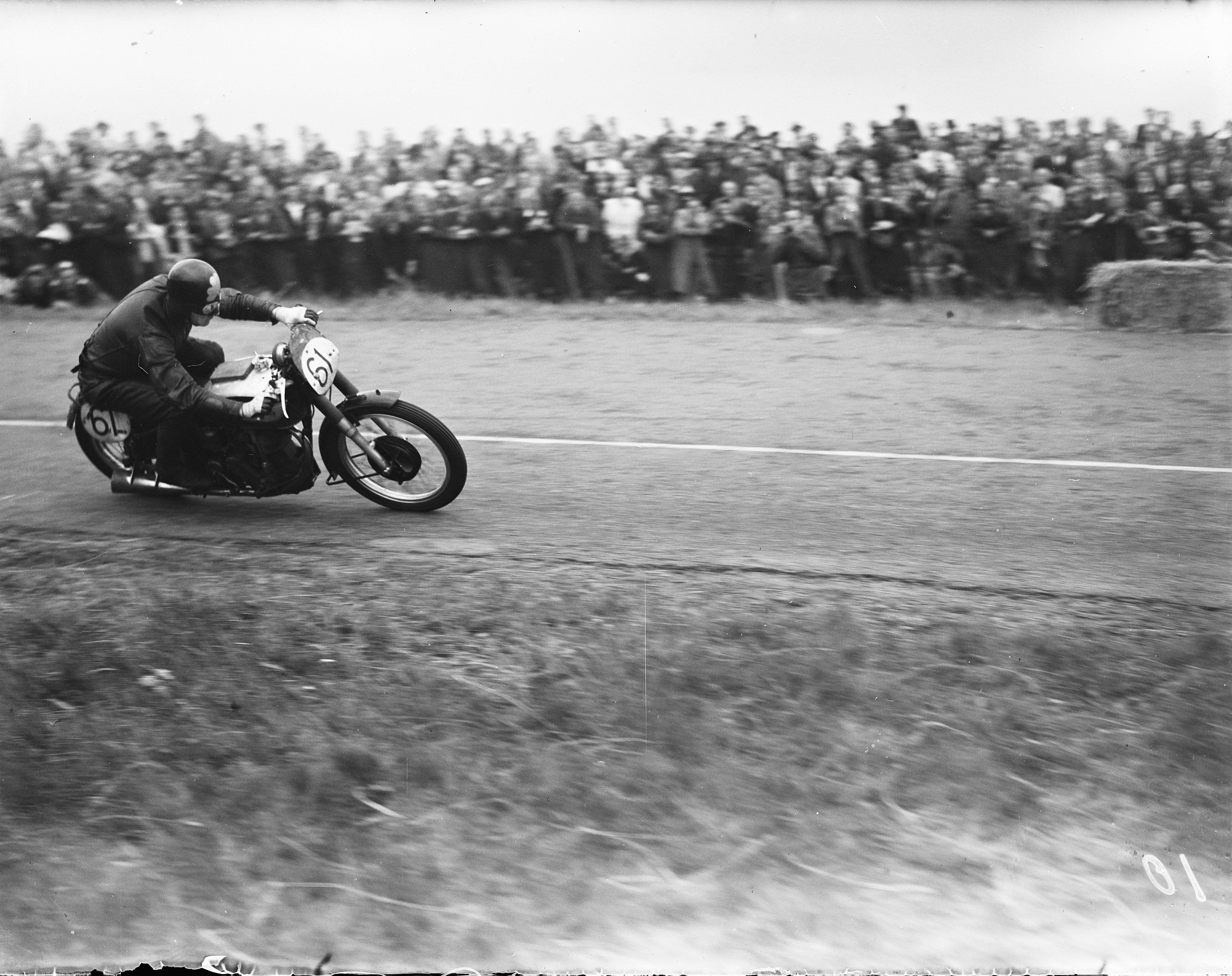
- Nationality: British
- Born: 6 September 1914; Belfast, Ireland, United Kingdom
- Died: 7 August 1972 (aged 57)
Motorcycle racing career statistics
Grand Prix motorcycle racing
Active years	1949 – 1950
First race	1949 Isle of Man; 350cc Junior TT
Last race	1950 350cc Belgian Grand Prix
First win	1950 Isle of Man; 350cc Junior TT
Last win	1950 Isle of Man; 350cc Junior TT
Team	Norton
Championships	0
Starts / Wins / Podiums / Poles / F. laps / Points; 9 / 1 / 5 / 0 / 1 / 47

Arthur James Bell (6 September 1914 – 7 August 1972) was a British (Northern Irish) motorcycle road racer who became known for his short post-World War II Isle of Man TT career that came to notice with his second-place finish in the 1947 Isle of Man TT on a second-hand 500cc Norton he bought himself on which he led for three of the seven laps.

== Early career ==
Bell began motorcycling as a teenager despite the opposition of his father, who at one time forced him to get rid of his Sunbeam motorcycle, but by 1938 Bell prevailed and rode in minor events progressing to a second-place finish in the North West 200 an event that still takes place in Northern Ireland.

== Active years ==
Riding his 1939 Norton, Bell participated in several races in the immediate post-World War II period including the 1946 Cookstown 100 event where he recorded the fastest lap time of 76.60 mph and winning the 1947 500cc Ulster Grand Prix race with an average speed of 91.25 mph (146 km/h) in a time of 2 hours 43 minutes 1 second, while setting a new lap record of 94.79 mph (151.17 km/h). Away from motorbikes, he also won the 1946 Circuit of Ireland Rally, in a 12/4 Riley Sprite. Bell also won the 1947 North West 200.

Following his 1947 Isle of Man performance, Norton picked Bell up as a works rider for the following season. He did not finish in his TT Junior 350cc race, however, the next season he claimed first place in the 500cc Senior TT race and third place in the 350cc Junior event. In 1949, he placed third and fourth in the TT as well as taking the North West 200 again. Norton introduced the Featherbed frame in 1950 contributing to his 1950 first place in the 350cc Junior race and second place in the 500cc Senior race. Further placings in the 1950 Dutch TT and Swiss Grand Prix ensured his position in the 1950 Grand Prix season with seventh and fourth place respectively in the 500cc and 350cc championship standings. Bell also claimed the North West 200 for a third time.

Unfortunately, Bell's promising racing career came to an end following a high-speed crash during the 1950 season at La Source Hairpin during the 1950 Belgian Grand Prix at the extremely fast Spa-Francorchamps circuit. The accident occurred during the 500cc race when the leader Carlo Bandirola was being followed by Les Graham and Bell. When Bandirola braked early for the La Source Hairpin, a collision occurred when the AJS Porcupine motorcycle ridden by Graham hit the rear wheel of the motorcycle ridden by Bandirola. Although Graham was thrown clear, Bell hit the AJS Porcupine and machines collided at high speed with a timing-post at La Source Hairpin. Bell was unable to race again even though he survived serious injury.

Bell died on 7 August 1972 at his home in County Down. In 1996 the Irish Post Office issued a set postage stamps of notable Irish motorcyclists that included a stamp depicting Artie Bell. Also in 1996, the Isle of Man Post Office issued a set of post stamps of Irish Isle of Man TT winners including Artie Bell's win during the 1950 Junior TT race.

== Motor-Cycle Grand Prix results ==
FIM World Motor-Cycle Championship

Year	Class	Team	1	2	3	4	5	6	Points	Rank	Wins
1949	350cc	Norton	IOM; 3	SUI; 6	NED -	BEL -	ULS -		7	10th	0
1949	500cc	Norton	IOM; 4	SUI; DNF	NED; 4	BEL; 4	ULS; 2	NAT -	6	7th	0
1950	350cc	Norton	IOM; 1	BEL; 2	NED -	SUI -	ULS -	NAT -	14	4th	1
1950	500cc	Norton	IOM; 2	BEL -	NED -	SUI -	ULS -	NAT -	6	7th	0

== See also ==
- 1949 Grand Prix motorcycle racing season
- 1950 Grand Prix motorcycle racing season
- 1950 Isle of Man TT
- List of people on the postage stamps of Ireland
