= Harold Daniell =

British motorcycle racer

- Nationality: British
- Born: 29 October 1909
- Died: 19 January 1967 (aged 57)
Motorcycle racing career statistics
Grand Prix motorcycle racing
Active years	1949 - 1950
Team	Norton
Starts / Wins / Podiums / Poles / F. laps / Points; / 1 / 3 / / / 33
Isle of Man TT career
TTs contested	10 (1934-1939, 1947-1950)
TT wins	3
First TT win	1938 Senior TT
Last TT win	1949 Senior TT
TT podiums	5

Harold Daniell (29 October 1909 – 19 January 1967) was a British professional Grand Prix motorcycle road racer and auto racing driver. He competed in the 1940s and 1950s. On retiring from racing he owned a Norton motorcycle dealership in Forest Hill, London.

Daniell and George Rowley rode the supercharged AJS V4s in the 1936 Isle of Man Senior TT, but despite its high top speed, it lacked acceleration. Both riders retired due to mechanical problems.

In the 1938 Isle of Man TT' Daniell completed the first under 25-minute (24min.52.6sec), 91.00 plus mph, lap of the Isle of Man TT Snaefell Mountain Course on his Norton in the Senior TT, a record which would stand for 12 years. He won, beating Stanley Woods by only 14.4 seconds.

Daniell competed in the 1949 Grand Prix motorcycle racing season riding on a 500cc Norton and finished sixth overall with 17 points in the World Championship while Leslie Graham and Nello Pagani finished first and second respectively. In the same year he also won the Isle of Man Senior TT and was placed fifth in the Junior TT. His victory in the Senior TT makes him the first race winner of the MotoGP (then 500 cc) class.

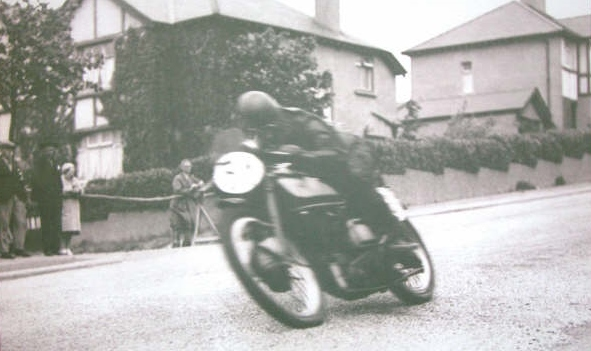
Harold Daniell through Bray Hill at the 1938 Isle of Man TT

Daniell's Isle of Man TT racing career spanned the years from 1930 until 1950 and included three victories and several placings in the Tourist Trophy races but he also competed in the Manx Grand Prix. Daniell declared that the new Norton was like "riding on a featherbed" compared with riding the "garden gate" - and it has been called the Featherbed frame ever since. After his motorcycle racing career, Daniell began auto racing, entering Formula 3 events at the wheel of an Emeryson car.

TT Career Summary								
Finishing Position	1	2	3	4	5	8	9	DNF
Number of times	3	1	1	1	4	1	2	7

== World Championship results ==
(key) (Races in bold indicate pole position; races in italics indicate fastest lap.)

Year	Class	Motorcycle	1	2	3	4	5	6	Rank	Points
1949			IOM	SUI	NED	BEL	ULS	NAT		
1949	350 cc	Norton	4						12th	6
1949	500 cc	Norton	1	3	6	7			6th	17
1950			IOM	BEL	NED	SUI	ULS	NAT		
1950	350 cc	Norton	3	6		9	6		8th	6
1950	500 cc	Norton	5			5		10	12th	4
