= Dario Ambrosini =

Italian motorcycle racer (1918–1951)

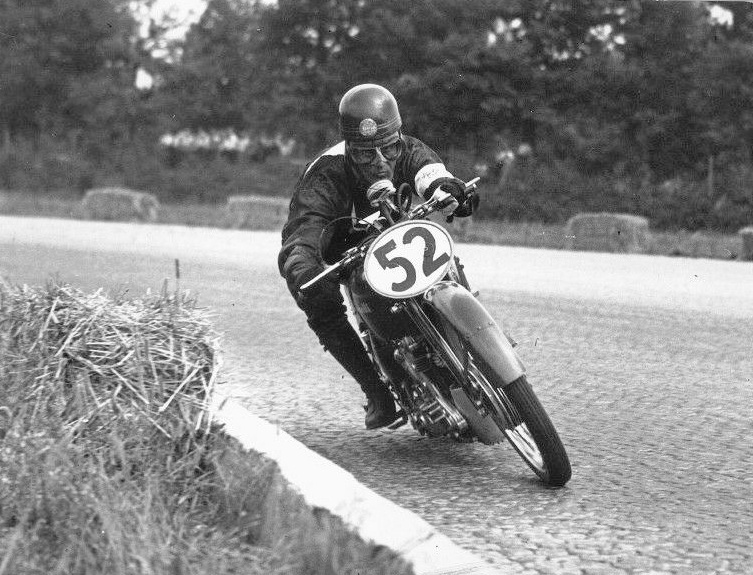
- Dario Ambrosini at 1949 Nations motorcycle Grand Prix at Monza
- Nationality: Italian
Motorcycle racing career statistics
Grand Prix motorcycle racing
Active years	1949 - 1951
First race	1949 250cc Swiss Grand Prix
Last race	1951 Isle of Man 250cc Lightweight TT
First win	1949 250cc Nations Grand Prix
Last win	1951 250cc Swiss Grand Prix
Team	Benelli
Championships	250cc - 1950
Starts / Wins / Podiums / Poles / F. laps / Points; 8 / 5 / 8 / 0 / 0 / 57
Isle of Man TT career
TTs contested	3 (1949 - 1951)
TT wins	1
First TT win	1950 Lightweight TT
Last TT win	1950 Lightweight TT
TT podiums	2

Dario Ambrosini (7 March 1918 in Cesena - 14 July 1951 in Albi) was an Italian Grand Prix motorcycle road racer who competed for the Benelli factory racing team. He finished second to Bruno Ruffo in the inaugural FIM 250cc world championship in 1949. He returned in 1950 and claimed the 250cc world championship with three victories including one at the 1950 Isle of Man TT. Ambrosini was killed during official practice for the 1951 French Grand Prix at Albi.

== Motorcycle Grand Prix results ==
1949 point system

Position	1	2	3	4	5	Fastest lap
Points	10	8	7	6	5	1

Points system from 1950 to 1968

Position	1	2	3	4	5	6
Points	8	6	4	3	2	1

5 best results were counted up until 1955.

(key) (Races in italics indicate fastest lap)

Year	Class	Team	1	2	3	4	5	6	7	8	Points	Rank	Wins
1949	250cc	Benelli	IOM; NC	SUI; 2	ULS -	NAT; 1					19	2nd	1
1950	250cc	Benelli	IOM; 1	SUI; 1	ULS; 2	NAT; 1					24	1st	3
1951	250cc	Benelli	ESP -	SUI; 1	IOM; 2	BEL -	NED -	FRA (†)	ULS -	NAT -	14	3rd	1
