= 1950 Grand Prix motorcycle racing season =

Sports season

1950 F.I.M. Grand Prix motorcycle racing season

Seasons
- ← 1949 1951 →

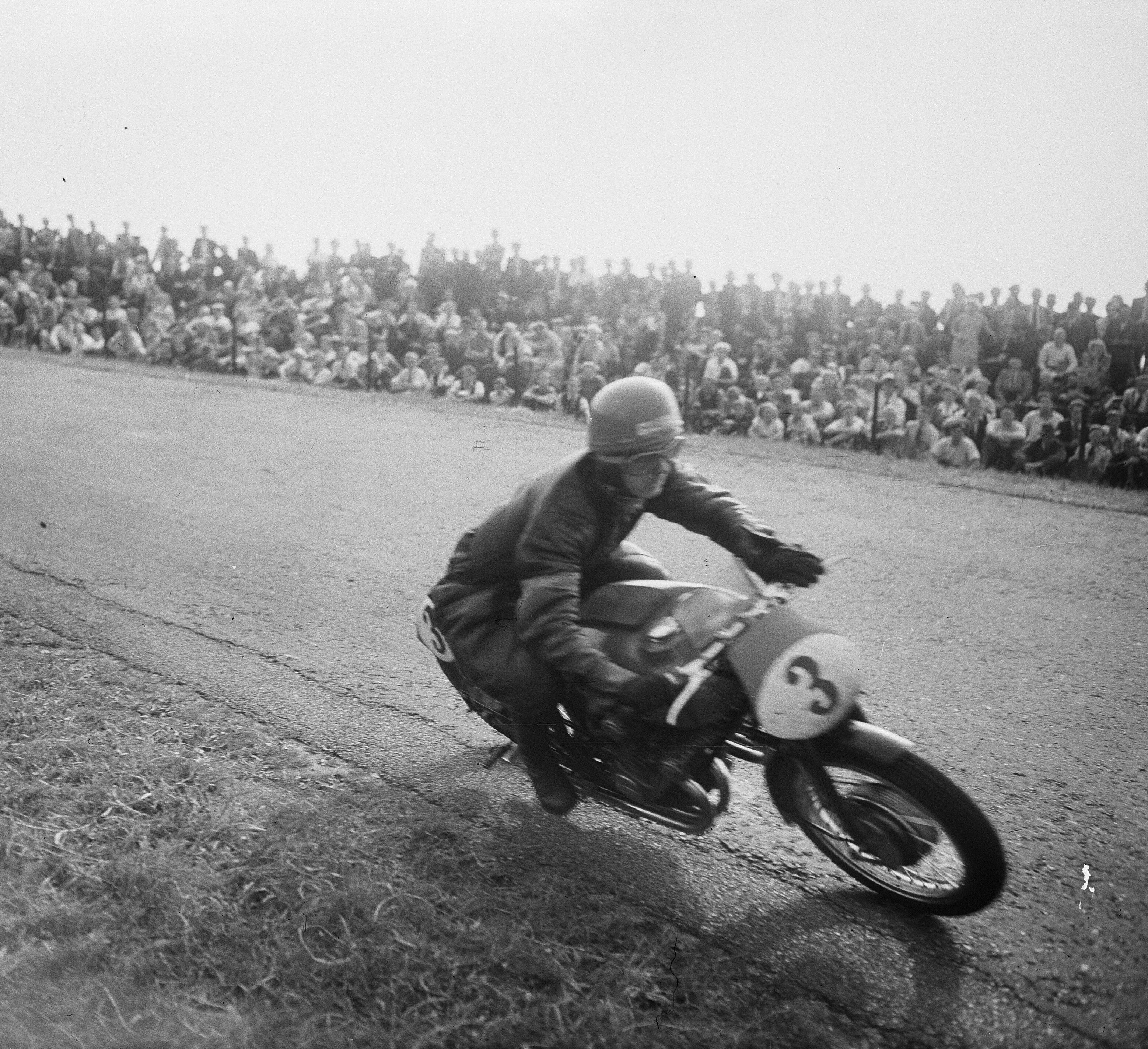
Umberto Masetti won his first 500cc World Championship title in 1950.

The 1950 Grand Prix motorcycle racing season was the second F.I.M. Road Racing World Championship Grand Prix season. The season consisted of six Grand Prix races in five classes: 500cc, 350cc, 250cc, 125cc and Sidecars 600cc. It began on 10 June, with Isle of Man TT and ended with Nations Grand Prix on 10 September.

== 1950 Grand Prix season calendar ==
Round	Date	Grand Prix	Circuit	125cc winner	250cc winner	350cc winner	500cc winner	Sidecars 600cc winner	Report
1	10 June	Isle of Man TT	Snaefell Mountain		(Italy) Dario Ambrosini	(Northern Ireland) Artie Bell	(United Kingdom) Geoff Duke		Report
2	2 July	(Belgium) Belgian Grand Prix	Spa-Francorchamps			(United Kingdom) Bob Foster	(Italy) Umberto Masetti	(United Kingdom) (Italy) Oliver / Dobelli	Report
3	8 July	(Netherlands) Dutch TT	Assen	(Italy) Bruno Ruffo		(United Kingdom) Bob Foster	(Italy) Umberto Masetti		Report
4	23 July	(Switzerland) Swiss Grand Prix	Geneva		(Italy) Dario Ambrosini	(United Kingdom) Leslie Graham	(United Kingdom) Leslie Graham	(United Kingdom) (Italy) Oliver / Dobelli	Report
5	18 August	(Northern Ireland) Ulster Grand Prix	Clady	(Italy) Carlo Ubbiali	(United Kingdom) Maurice Cann	(United Kingdom) Bob Foster	(United Kingdom) Geoff Duke		Report
6	10 September	(Italy) Nations Grand Prix	Monza	(Italy) Gianni Leoni	(Italy) Dario Ambrosini	(United Kingdom) Geoff Duke	(United Kingdom) Geoff Duke	(United Kingdom) (Italy) Oliver / Dobelli	Report

== Standings ==
=== Scoring system ===
Points were awarded to the top six finishers in each race. All rounds counted towards the championship in the 125cc and Sidecars, the best three races counted in the 250cc, while in the 350cc and 500cc championships, only the best four results counted.

Position	1st	2nd	3rd	4th	5th	6th
Points	8	6	4	3	2	1

==== 500cc final standings ====
Pos	Rider	Machine	MAN (Isle of Man)	BEL (Belgium)	HOL (Netherlands)	SUI (Switzerland)	ULS (Ulster)	NAC (Italy)	Pts
1	(Italy) Umberto Masetti	Gilera		1	1	2	6	2	**28** (29)
2	(United Kingdom) Geoff Duke	Norton	**1**	Ret	Ret	4	1	1	**27**
3	(United Kingdom) Leslie Graham	AJS Porcupine	4	Ret	Ret	1	2	7	**17**
4	(Italy) Nello Pagani	Gilera		2	2	10	7	Ret	**12**
5	(Italy) Carlo Bandirola	Gilera		4	4	3	Ret	5	**12**
6	(United Kingdom) Johnny Lockett	Norton	3	Ret	Ret	6	3	8	**9**
7	(Northern Ireland) Artie Bell	Norton	2	Ret					**6**
8	(Italy) Arciso Artesiani	MV Agusta		5	Ret	12		3	**6**
9	(Australia) Harry Hinton	Norton	10	6	3	Ret	DNS		**5**
10	(United Kingdom) Ted Frend	AJS	15	3	Ret	Ret	Ret	11	**4**
11	(United Kingdom) Dickie Dale	Norton	7	9	Ret		4	6	**4**
12	(United Kingdom) Harold Daniell	Norton	5	Ret	Ret	5	DNS	10	**4**
13	(Italy) Alfredo Milani	Gilera				Ret		4	**3**
14	(Australia) Eric McPherson	AJS / Norton	14	Ret	5				**2**
15	(United Kingdom) Jock West	AJS					5		**2**
16	(New Zealand) Syd Jensen	Triumph / AJS	Ret	12	6	Ret			**1**
17	(Republic of Ireland) Reg Armstrong	Velocette	6	8				Ret	**1**
18	(United Kingdom) Phil Heath	Norton	34	13	7	Ret	8		**0**
19	(United Kingdom) Bob Foster	Moto Guzzi / AJS / Velocette	Ret	7	Ret	Ret		15	**0**
20	(Switzerland) Georges Cordey	Norton / Velocette				7		Ret	**0**
21	(United Kingdom) Ken Armstrong	MV Agusta / Velocette			9	8			**0**
22	(United Kingdom) Albert Moule	Norton	17	Ret	8	11	Ret		**0**
23	(Northern Ireland) Cromie McCandless	Norton	8						**0**
24	(United Kingdom) Jack Brett	Norton	9	11					**0**
25	(France) Georges Houel	Gilera		Ret		9			**0**
=	(Northern Ireland) Harry Turner	Norton	Ret				9		**0**
26	(Italy) Giuseppe Colnago	Gilera						9	**0**
27	(New Zealand) Jim Swarbrick	Norton	18	11	10	15			**0**
28	(Italy) Felice Benasedo	Moto Guzzi		10	Ret			Ret	**0**
29	(United Kingdom) Ernie Barrett	Norton	Ret				10		**0**
30	(Australia) George Morrison	Norton	11	Ret			DNS		**0**
31	(United Kingdom) Jim Kentish	Norton	Ret				11		**0**
=	(Netherlands) Louis van Rijswijk	Triumph		Ret	11				**0**
33	(United Kingdom) Arthur Wheeler	Norton	26	14	12		DNS		**0**
34	(United Kingdom) Freddie Fairbairn	Vincent Grey Flash	51				12		**0**
35	(United Kingdom) Ken Bills	Vincent Grey Flash	12						**0**
=	(Italy) Guido Leoni	MV Agusta						12	**0**
37	(United Kingdom) Ernie Braine	Norton	46	Ret	14		13		**0**
38	(Belgium) Albert Vertriest	Triumph		16	13				**0**
39	(Switzerland) Benoit Musy	Moto Guzzi				13		18	**0**
40	(Isle of Man) Tommy McEwans	Triumph	13						**0**
=	(Italy) Armando Miele	Gilera						13	**0**
42	(Italy) Dante Bianchi	Moto Guzzi						14	**0**
=	(Switzerland) Hans Haldemann	Norton				14			**0**
44	(Belgium) Auguste Goffin	Norton		15				17	**0**
45	(United Kingdom) Sidney Mason	Norton		Ret	15				**0**
46	(Sweden) Evert Carlsson	Norton		19	16				**0**
47	(United Kingdom) Roy Evans	Norton	16						**0**
=	(France) Georges Monneret	Norton						16	**0**
49	(United Kingdom) Ernie Thomas	Triumph		Ret	17	Ret		Ret	**0**
50	(Belgium) Jaak Delsing	Triumph		17					**0**
51	(Finland) Väinö Hollming	Norton / Velocette		18	Ret	Ret		Ret	**0**
52	(Italy) Adelmo Mandolini	Moto Guzzi						19	**0**
=	(United Kingdom) David Whitworth	Triumph	19						**0**
54	(United Kingdom) Sid Lawton	AJS / Rudge	20				DNS		**0**
55	(Italy) Lodovico Facchinelli	Moto Guzzi						20	**0**
56	(Italy) Dario Basso	Gilera						21	**0**
=	(United Kingdom) Ashley Len Parry	Norton	21						**0**
58	(Italy) Libero Liberati	Moto Guzzi						22	**0**
=	(United Kingdom) Stan Miller	Norton	22						**0**
60	(United Kingdom) Bill Beevers	Norton	23						**0**
61	(United Kingdom) John Simister	Triumph	24						**0**
62	(United Kingdom) Vic Willoughby	Norton	25	Ret	Ret				**0**
63	(United Kingdom) Les Archer	Norton	27						**0**
64	(United Kingdom) Charlie Brett	Velocette	28						**0**
65	(United Kingdom) Guy Newman	Norton	29						**0**
66	(Northern Ireland) Charlie Gray	AJS	30						**0**
67	(Scotland) George Paterson	AJS	31						**0**
68	(United Kingdom) Roy Walker	Norton	32						**0**
69	(United Kingdom) Jack Varlow	Norton	33						**0**
70	(United Kingdom) Jack Harding	Norton	35				Ret		**0**
71	(United Kingdom) Syd Barnett	AJS	36						**0**
72	(United Kingdom) Eric Hardy	Norton	37						**0**
73	(United Kingdom) Humphrey Ranson	AJS	38						**0**
74	(United Kingdom) John Fisher	Norton	39						**0**
75	(United Kingdom) Ernest Walker	Norton	40						**0**
76	(United Kingdom) Reg Lee	AJS	41						**0**
77	(United Kingdom) Jack Bailey	Triumph	42						**0**
78	(United Kingdom) Charlie Salt	Velocette	43	Ret	Ret		Ret		**0**
79	(United Kingdom) Leslie Harris	Velocette	44						**0**
80	(United Kingdom) Joe Glazebrook	Triumph	45						**0**
81	(United Kingdom) Syl Anderton	Triumph	47						**0**
82	(United Kingdom) Llewelyn Ranson	AJS	48						**0**
83	(New Zealand) John Dale	Norton	49						**0**
84	(Northern Ireland) Reg McDonald	Velocette	50						**0**
85	(United Kingdom) Bob McDonald	AJS	52						**0**
-	(United Kingdom) Eric Briggs	Norton	Ret	Ret	Ret				**0**
-	(United Kingdom) Oliver Scott	Norton	Ret	Ret	Ret				**0**
-	(United Kingdom) Bill Hall	Triumph	Ret	Ret					**0**
-	(United Kingdom) Bill Lomas	Velocette		Ret	Ret				**0**
-	(Northern Ireland) Bob Matthews	Velocette	Ret					Ret	**0**
-	(United Kingdom) Bert Meyers	Norton	Ret				Ret		**0**
-	(Scotland) Fergus Anderson	Moto Guzzi						Ret	**0**
-	(Republic of Ireland) Manliff Barrington	Vincent Grey Flash	Ret						**0**
-	(Italy) Bruno Bertacchini	Moto Guzzi						Ret	**0**
-	(Italy) Aldo Brini	Gilera						Ret	**0**
-	(Republic of Ireland) Thomas Byrne	Triumph					Ret		**0**
-	(United Kingdom) Maurice Cann	Moto Guzzi						Ret	**0**
-	(Republic of Ireland) Gerard Carter	Norton					Ret		**0**
-	(Italy) Luigi Ciai	Moto Guzzi						Ret	**0**
-	(Belgium) Eugéne Cordang	Triumph		Ret					**0**
-	(United Kingdom) Les Dear	Norton	Ret						**0**
-	(United Kingdom) Wilmot Evans	Bitza					Ret		**0**
-	(United Kingdom) Mike Featherstone	AJS		Ret					**0**
-	(United Kingdom) Lennart Fenning	Norton					Ret		**0**
-	(United Kingdom) Jack Fletcher	BSA	Ret						**0**
-	(Netherlands) Cees Fokke-Bosch	Norton			Ret				**0**
-	(Italy) Sante Geminiani	Moto Guzzi						Ret	**0**
-	(United Kingdom) Rob Harrison	Triumph	Ret						**0**
-	(United Kingdom) Johnny Hodgkin	Vincent Grey Flash	Ret						**0**
-	(United Kingdom) Chris Horn	Norton	Ret						**0**
-	(United Kingdom) Eddie Iffland	Norton	Ret						**0**
-	(United Kingdom) Denis Jenkinson	Norton				Ret			**0**
-	(Netherlands) Piet Knijnenburg	BMW R51/2			Ret				**0**
-	(United Kingdom) Max Klein	Norton	Ret						**0**
-	(Switzerland) Willy Lips	Norton				Ret			**0**
-	(United Kingdom) Bill Maddrick	Velocette	Ret						**0**
-	(Belgium) Léon Martin	Norton		Ret					**0**
-	(Switzerland) Robert Müller	Norton				Ret			**0**
-	(United Kingdom) Bill Petch	Norton	Ret						**0**
-	(Netherlands) Hub Pellikaan	BMW R51/2			Ret				**0**
-	(United Kingdom) Cecil Sandford	Velocette	Ret						**0**
-	(Netherlands) Jacques Schot	Norton			Ret				**0**
-	(Italy) Elio Scopingo	Moto Guzzi						Ret	**0**
-	(United Kingdom) Cyril Stevens	Vincent	Ret						**0**
-	(Netherlands) Drikus Veer	Triumph			Ret				**0**
-	(Netherlands) Jan Veer	Triumph			Ret				**0**
-	(United Kingdom) Robert Weston	Norton	Ret						**0**
-	(Switzerland) Henri Widonne	Norton				Ret			**0**
Pos	Rider	Bike	MAN (Isle of Man)	BEL (Belgium)	HOL (Netherlands)	SUI (Switzerland)	ULS (Ulster)	NAC (Italy)	Pts

Colour	Result
Gold	Winner
Silver	Second place
Bronze	Third place
Green	Points classification
Blue	Non-points classification
Blue	Non-classified finish (NC)
Purple	Retired, not classified (Ret)
Red	Did not qualify (DNQ)
Red	Did not pre-qualify (DNPQ)
Black	Disqualified (DSQ)
White	Did not start (DNS)
White	Withdrew (WD)
White	Race cancelled (C)
Blank	Did not practice (DNP)
Blank	Did not arrive (DNA)
Blank	Excluded (EX)

**Bold** – Pole
Italics – Fastest Lap

==== Constructors' 500cc World Championship ====
Pos	Constructor	(Isle of Man)	(Belgium)	(Netherlands)	(Switzerland)	(Ulster)	(Italy)	Pts
1	(United Kingdom) Norton	1	6	3	4	1	1	**28** (32)
2	(Italy) Gilera	–	1	1	2	6	2	**28** (29)
3	(United Kingdom) AJS	4	3	5	1	2		**21**
4	(Italy) MV Agusta	–	5	9	8	–	3	**6**
5	(United Kingdom) Triumph	13	12	6	Ret	Ret	–	**1**
6	(United Kingdom) Velocette	6	7	9	7	Ret	15	**1**
–	(Japan) Bitza	–	–	–	–	Ret	–	**0**
–	(Germany) BMW	–	–	Ret	–	–	–	**0**
–	(United Kingdom) BSA	Ret	–	–	–	–	–	**0**
–	(Italy) Moto Guzzi	Ret	7	Ret	13	–	14	**0**
–	(United Kingdom) Rudge-Whitworth	20	–	–	–	–	–	**0**
–	(United Kingdom) Vincent	12	–	–	–	12	–	**0**

=== 1950 350cc Roadracing World Championship final standings ===
Place	Rider	Number	Country	Machine	Points	Wins
1	(United Kingdom) Bob Foster		United Kingdom	Velocette	30	3
2	(United Kingdom) Geoff Duke		United Kingdom	Norton	24	1
3	(United Kingdom) Leslie Graham		United Kingdom	AJS	17	1
4	(United Kingdom) Artie Bell		United Kingdom	Norton	14	1
5	(Republic of Ireland) Reg Armstrong		United Kingdom	Velocette	11	0
6	(Australia) Eric Hinton		Australia	Norton	9	0
7	(United Kingdom) Bill Lomas		United Kingdom	Velocette	9	0
8	(United Kingdom) Harold Daniell		United Kingdom	Norton	6	0
9	(United Kingdom) John Lockett		United Kingdom	Norton	4	0
9	(United Kingdom) Dickie Dale		United Kingdom	AJS	4	0
11	(United Kingdom) Ted Frend		United Kingdom	AJS	4	0
12	(Australia) Eric McPherson		Australia	AJS	3	0
13	(United Kingdom) Cecil Sandford		United Kingdom	AJS	3	0

=== 1950 250cc Roadracing World Championship final standings ===
Place	Rider	Number	Country	Machine	Points	Wins
1	(Italy) Dario Ambrosini		Italy	Benelli	24	3
2	(United Kingdom) Maurice Cann		United Kingdom	Moto Guzzi	14	1
3	(United Kingdom) Fergus Anderson		United Kingdom	Moto Guzzi	6	0
3	(Italy) Bruno Ruffo		Italy	Moto Guzzi	6	0
5	(United Kingdom) Dickie Dale		United Kingdom	Benelli	4	0
5	(Republic of Ireland) Wilf Billington		Ireland	Moto Guzzi	4	0
5	(Italy) Bruno Francisci		Italy	Benelli	4	0
5	(United Kingdom) Ronald Mead		United Kingdom	Velocette	4	0
9	(United Kingdom) Arthur Burton		United Kingdom	Excelsior	3	0
9	(Italy) Claudio Mastellari		Italy	Moto Guzzi	3	0
9	(Switzerland) Benoit Musy		Switzerland	Moto Guzzi	3	0
9	(United Kingdom) Roland Pike		United Kingdom	Rudge	3	0
13	(United Kingdom) David Andrews		United Kingdom	Excelsior	2	0

=== 125cc ===
==== Riders' standings ====
Pos.	Rider	Bike	NED (Netherlands)	ULS (Ulster)	NAT (Italy)	Pts
1	(Italy) Bruno Ruffo	Mondial	1**^{F}**	2	4	17
2	(Italy) Gianni Leoni	Mondial	2		1	14
2	(Italy) Carlo Ubbiali	Mondial		1**^{F}**	2**^{F}**	14
4	(Italy) Giuseppe Matucci	Morini	3			4
4	(Italy) Luigi Zinzani	Morini			3	4
6	(Italy) Umberto Braga	Mondial	4			3
7	(Italy) Raffaele Alberti	Mondial			5	2
7	(Italy) Felice Benasedo	MV Agusta	5			2
9	(Netherlands) Gijs Lagervey	Sparta	6			2
10	(Italy) Emilio Soprani	Morini			6	1
Pos.	Rider	Bike	SUI (Switzerland)	NED (Netherlands)	NAT (Italy)	Pts

Race key
Colour	Result
Gold	Winner
Silver	2nd place
Bronze	3rd place
Green	Points finish
Blue	Non-points finish
Blue	Non-classified finish (NC)
Purple	Retired (Ret)
Red	Did not qualify (DNQ)
Black	Disqualified (DSQ)
White	Did not start (DNS)
White	Withdrew (WD)
White	Race cancelled (C)
Blank	Did not practice (DNP)
Blank	Excluded (EX)
Blank	Did not arrive (DNA)
Blank	Did not enter (empty cell)
Annotation	Meaning
P	Pole position
F	Fastest lap
Rider key
Colour	Meaning
Light blue	Rookie rider

==== Constructors' standings ====
Each constructor is awarded the same number of points as their best placed rider in each race.

Pos.	Constructor	NED (Netherlands)	ULS (Ulster)	NAT (Italy)	Pts
1	(Italy) Mondial	1	1	1	24
2	(Italy) Morini	3		3	8
3	(Italy) MV Agusta	5			2
4	(Netherlands) Sparta	6			1
Pos.	Constructor	NED (Netherlands)	ULS (Ulster)	NAT (Italy)	Pts
