= List of Grand Prix motorcycle racers: J =

Name	Seasons	World Championships	MotoGP Wins	500cc Wins	350cc Wins	Moto2 Wins	250cc Wins	Moto3 Wins	125cc Wins	80cc Wins	50cc Wins	MotoE Wins
(United States) P. J. Jacobsen	2008	0	0	0	0	0	0	0	0	0	0	0
(France) Olivier Jacque	1995-2005, 2007	1; 250cc - 2000	0	0	0	0	7	0	0	0	0	0
(France) Quentin Jacquet	2009-2010	0	0	0	0	0	0	0	0	0	0	0
(Sweden) Börje Jansson	1969-1973	0	0	0	0	0	1	0	3	0	0	0
(Slovakia) Jakub Jantulík	2009	0	0	0	0	0	0	0	0	0	0	0
(Spain) Raúl Jara	2001-2002	0	0	0	0	0	0	0	0	0	0	0
(France) Jean-Pierre Jeandat	1989-1996	0	0	0	0	0	0	0	0	0	0	0
(United Kingdom) David Jefferies	1993	0	0	0	0	0	0	0	0	0	0	0
(United Kingdom) Tony Jefferies	1970-1971	0	0	0	1	0	0	0	0	0	0	0
(United Kingdom) Griff Jenkins	1964-1965, 1967	0	0	0	0	0	0	0	0	0	0	0
(United Kingdom) Denis Jenkinson	1950	0	0	0	0	0	0	0	0	0	0	0
(Germany) Steve Jenkner	1997-2005	0	0	0	0	0	0	1	0	0	0	0
(New Zealand) Syd Jensen	1949-1950	0	0	0	0	0	0	0	0	0	0	0
(Spain) Enrique Jerez	2004-2008	0	0	0	0	0	0	0	0	0	0	0
(Germany) Lothar John	1966, 1968-1973	0	0	0	0	0	0	0	0	0	0	0
(Australia) Mike Jones	2016, 2018	0	0	0	0	0	0	0	0	0	0	0
(Republic of Ireland) Paul Jordan	2008-2009	0	0	0	0	0	0	0	0	0	0	0
(Belgium) Serge Julin	1984-1985, 1987-1989	0	0	0	0	0	0	0	0	0	0	0
(Hungary) Károly Juhász	1987-1988	0	0	0	0	0	0	0	0	0	0	0
