= 1950 Belgian motorcycle Grand Prix =

(Belgium) 1950 Belgian Grand Prix
Race details
- Race 2 of 6 races in the 1950 Grand Prix motorcycle racing season
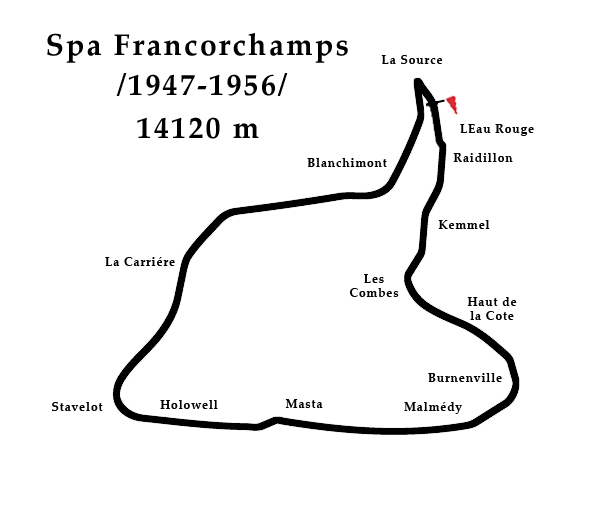
- Date: 2 July 1950
- Location: Circuit de Spa-Francorchamps
- Course: Permanent racing facility; 14.120 km (8.774 mi)

500cc
Fastest lap
Rider	(United Kingdom) Geoff Duke	Norton
Time	5:04	
Podium
First	(Italy) Umberto Masetti	Gilera
Second	(Italy) Nello Pagani	Gilera
Third	(United Kingdom) Ted Frend	AJS

350cc
Fastest lap
Rider	(United Kingdom) Artie Bell	Norton
Time	5:21	
Podium
First	(United Kingdom) Bob Foster	Velocette
Second	(United Kingdom) Artie Bell	Norton
Third	(United Kingdom) Geoff Duke	Norton

Sidecar (B2A)
Fastest lap
Rider	(United Kingdom) Eric Oliver (Italy) Ercole Frigerio	Norton; Gilera
Passenger	(Italy) Lorenzo Dobelli (Italy) Ezio Ricotti	
Time	6:20	
Podium
First rider	(United Kingdom) Eric Oliver	Norton
First passenger	(Italy) Lorenzo Dobelli	
Second rider	(Italy) Ercole Frigerio	Gilera
Second passenger	(Italy) Ezio Ricotti	
Third rider	(Switzerland) Hans Haldemann	Norton
Third passenger	(Switzerland) Josef Albisser	

The 1950 Belgian motorcycle Grand Prix was the second race of the 1950 Grand Prix motorcycle racing season. It took place on the weekend of 2 July 1950 at the Circuit de Spa-Francorchamps. The event was marred by the fatal accident of Briton David Whitworth during the 350cc event. On the 10th lap, Whitworth tangled with Charlie Salt and crashed. Salt was able to keep going, but Whitworth had fractured his skull. He died the following day in a hospital close to the track.

== 500 cc classification ==
Pos	Rider	Manufacturer	Laps	Time	Points
1	(Italy) Umberto Masetti	Gilera	14	1:12:48.8	8
2	(Italy) Nello Pagani	Gilera	14	+31.7	6
3	(United Kingdom) Ted Frend	AJS	14	+33.2	4
4	(Italy) Carlo Bandirola	Gilera	14	+51.5	3
5	(Italy) Arciso Artesiani	MV Agusta	14	+57.7	2
6	(Australia) Harry Hinton	Norton	14	+1:42.8	1
7	(United Kingdom) Bob Foster	AJS	14	+1:53.5	
8	(Republic of Ireland) Reg Armstrong	Velocette	14	+3:05.7	
9	(United Kingdom) Dickie Dale	Norton	14	+4:09.8	
10	(Italy) Felice Benasedo	Moto Guzzi	14	+5:32.7	

== 350 cc classification ==
Pos	Rider	Manufacturer	Laps	Time	Points
1	(United Kingdom) Bob Foster	Velocette	11	59:28.8	8
2	(United Kingdom) Artie Bell	Norton	11	+24.6	6
3	(United Kingdom) Geoff Duke	Norton	11	+55.0	4
4	(United Kingdom) Bill Lomas	Velocette	11	+1:10.1	3
5	(United Kingdom) Charlie Salt	Velocette	11	+1:30.4	2
6	(United Kingdom) Harold Daniell	Norton	11	+1:35.8	1
7	(United Kingdom) Ted Frend	AJS	11	+2:20.2	
8	(Australia) Eric McPherson	AJS	11	+2:27.7	
9	(United Kingdom) Vic Willoughby	Velocette	11	+2:27.9	
10	(United Kingdom) Tommy Wood	Velocette	11	+2:28.7	
11	(Australia) Harry Hinton	Norton			
12	(United Kingdom) Dickie Dale	AJS			
13	(New Zealand) Syd Jensen	AJS			
14	(Australia) George Morrison	Norton			
15	(Belgium) Léon Martin	Velocette			
16	(United Kingdom) Arthur Wheeler	Velocette			
17	(United Kingdom) Ernie Thomas	Velocette			
18	(United Kingdom) Fergus Anderson	AJS			
19	(New Zealand) Jim Swarbrick	AJS			
20	(United Kingdom) Eric Oliver	AJS			
21	(United Kingdom) Albert Moule	Norton			
22	J. F. Kentish	AJS			
23	(Finland) Väinö Hollming	Velocette			

== Sidecar classification ==
Pos	Rider	Passenger	Manufacturer	Laps	Time	Points
1	(United Kingdom) Eric Oliver	(Italy) Lorenzo Dobelli	Norton	7	44:43.9	8
2	(Italy) Ercole Frigerio	(Italy) Ezio Ricotti	Gilera	7	+28.7	6
3	(Switzerland) Hans Haldemann	(Switzerland) Josef Albisser	Norton	7	+48.9	4
4	(Switzerland) Ferdinand Aubert	(Switzerland) René Aubert	Norton	7	+2:58.7	3
5	(Belgium) Alphonse Vervroegen	(Belgium) Pierrot Vervroegen	FN	7	+3:53.8	2
6	(Switzerland) Fritz Mühlemann	(Switzerland) Marie Mühlemann	Norton	7	+4:17.1	1
7	(Belgium) Julien Deronne	(Belgium) Johnny Anthony	Norton	7	+4:17.4	
8	(Belgium) Marcel Masuy	(United Kingdom) Denis Jenkinson	BMW	7	+4:33.3	
9	(United Kingdom) Pip Harris	(United Kingdom) Neil Smith	Norton	7	+4:41.2	
10	(Belgium) Adhémar Maréchal	(Belgium) Guy de Marneffe	BMW	7	+5:05.3	

Previous race: 1950 Isle of Man TT	FIM Grand Prix World Championship; 1950 season	Next race: 1950 Dutch TT
Previous race: 1949 Belgian Grand Prix	Belgian Grand Prix	Next race: 1951 Belgian Grand Prix
