= 1949 Belgian motorcycle Grand Prix =

(Belgium) 1949 Belgian Grand Prix
Race details
- Race 4 of 6 races in the 1949 Grand Prix motorcycle racing season
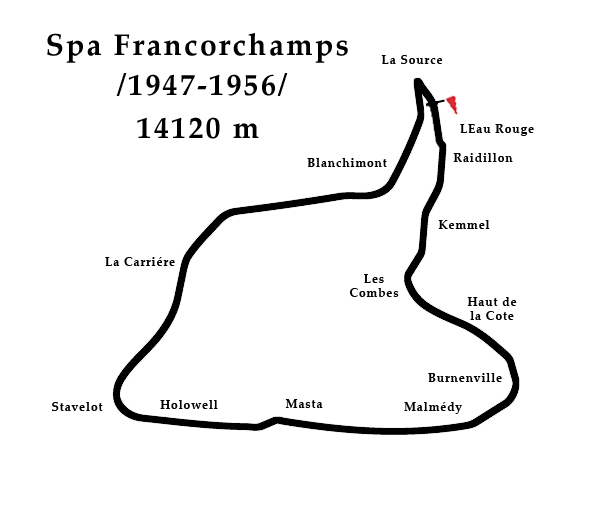
- Date: 17 July 1949
- Location: Circuit de Spa-Francorchamps
- Course: Permanent racing facility; 14.120 km (8.774 mi)

500cc
- Rider
Fastest lap
Rider	(Italy) Arciso Artesiani	Gilera
Time	96.3 mph (155.0 km/h)	
Podium
First	(United Kingdom) Bill Doran	AJS
Second	(Italy) Arciso Artesiani	Gilera
Third	(Italy) Enrico Lorenzetti	Moto Guzzi

350cc
- Rider
Fastest lap
Rider	(United Kingdom) Freddie Frith (United Kingdom) Bob Foster	Velocette; Velocette
Time	90.8 mph (146.1 km/h)	
Podium
First	(United Kingdom) Freddie Frith	Velocette
Second	(United Kingdom) Bob Foster	Velocette
Third	(United Kingdom) Johnny Lockett	Norton

Sidecar (B2A)
- Rider
Fastest lap
Rider	(United Kingdom) Eric Oliver	Norton
Podium
First	(United Kingdom) Eric Oliver	Norton
Second	(Belgium) Frans Vanderschrick	Norton
Third	(Italy) Ernesto Merlo	Gilera

The 1949 Belgian motorcycle Grand Prix was the fourth round of the 1949 Grand Prix motorcycle racing season. It took place at the Circuit de Spa-Francorchamps.

British rider Bill Doran won the 500cc race riding his AJS from Arciso Artesiani and Enrico Lorenzetti.

By winning their second race of the 600 cc Sidecar of the season British Norton rider Eric Oliver and his swinger Denis Jenkinson wrapped up the first Sidecar championship before the third and final round to be held at the Nations Grand Prix. In the same race, Belgian sidecar rider Edouard Bruylant and his British passenger known as "Hurst" were killed.

== 500 cc classification ==
Pos	Rider	Manufacturer	Time	Points
1	(United Kingdom) Bill Doran	AJS	1:19:56.0	10
2	(Italy) Arciso Artesiani	Gilera	+0.2	9
3	(Italy) Enrico Lorenzetti	Moto Guzzi	+1.3	7
4	(United Kingdom) Artie Bell	Norton	+50.0	6
5	(Italy) Nello Pagani	Gilera	+1:08.0	5
6	(Italy) Guido Leoni	Moto Guzzi	+1:14.0	
7	(United Kingdom) Harold Daniell	Norton		
8	(Australia) George Morrison	Norton		
9	(New Zealand) Syd Jensen	Triumph		
10	(United Kingdom) Ken Bills	Velocette		
16 finishers

== 350 cc classification ==
Pos	Rider	Manufacturer	Time	Points
1	(United Kingdom) Freddie Frith	Velocette	1h 06m 14s	10.5
2	(United Kingdom) Bob Foster	Velocette	+16s	8.5
3	(United Kingdom) Johnny Lockett	Norton	+33s	7
4	(United Kingdom) David Whitworth	Velocette	+1m 39s	6
5	(Australia) Eric McPherson	AJS	+2m 01s	5
6	(Republic of Ireland) Reg Armstrong	AJS	+2m 01s	
7	(United Kingdom) Eric Oliver	Velocette		
8	(Italy) Enrico Lorenzetti	Moto Guzzi		
9	(Netherlands) Louis van Rijswijk	Velocette		
10	(United Kingdom) Tommy Wood	Velocette		
22 finishers

== Sidecar Classification ==
Pos	Rider	Passenger	Manufacturer	Time	Points
1	(United Kingdom) Eric Oliver	(United Kingdom) Denis Jenkinson	Norton	50m 07s	11
2	(Belgium) Frans Vanderschrick	(United Kingdom) Martin Whitney	Norton	+25s	8
3	(Italy) Ernesto Merlo	(Italy) Dino Magri	Gilera	+1m 33s	7
4	(Switzerland) Roland Benz	(Switzerland) Max Hirzel	BMW	+1m 54s	6
5	(United Kingdom) Pip Harris	(United Kingdom) Neil Smith	Norton	+2m 31s	5
6	(Belgium) Raymond Rorsvort	(Belgium) Louis van Leemput	BMW	+4m 33s	
7	(Belgium) Alphonse Vervroegen	?	FN		
8	(Belgium) Jean Debotze	?	Norton		
8 finishers

Previous race: 1949 Dutch TT	FIM Grand Prix World Championship; 1949 season	Next race: 1949 Ulster Grand Prix
Previous race: None	Belgian motorcycle Grand Prix	Next race: 1950 Belgian Grand Prix
