= Bruno Ruffo =

Italian motorcycle racer (1920–2007)

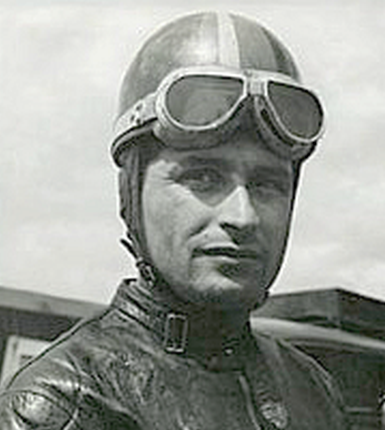
- Nationality: Italian
Motorcycle racing career statistics
Grand Prix motorcycle racing
Active years	1949-1952
First race	1949 250cc Swiss Grand Prix
Last race	1952 250cc Dutch TT
First win	1949 250cc Swiss Grand Prix
Last win	1951 250cc Ulster Grand Prix
Team(s)	Moto Guzzi, Mondial
Championships	250cc - 1949, 1951 125cc - 1950
Starts / Wins / Podiums / Poles / F. laps / Points; 14 / 4 / 10 / N/A / 5 / 78

Bruno Ruffo (9 December 1920 – 10 February 2007) was an Italian Grand Prix motorcycle road racer born in Verona. He won three Grand Prix World Championships.

In 1949, Ruffo won the inaugural 250cc World Championship riding for the Italian Moto Guzzi factory. During the 1950 season, Ruffo was annoyed that Moto Guzzi instructed him to let his teammate win the Championship that year while he finished third. That same year, Ruffo rode a Mondial to claim the 125cc World Championship. In 1951, he once again captured the 250cc World Championship with four victories. Ruffo retired in 1952 after an accident and opened a successful vehicle hire business in Verona. He died at 86 years old.

More Information http://www.motorsportmemorial.org/LWFWIW/focusLWFWIW.php?db2=LWF&db=ms&n=637

== Commemorative Sculpture. ==
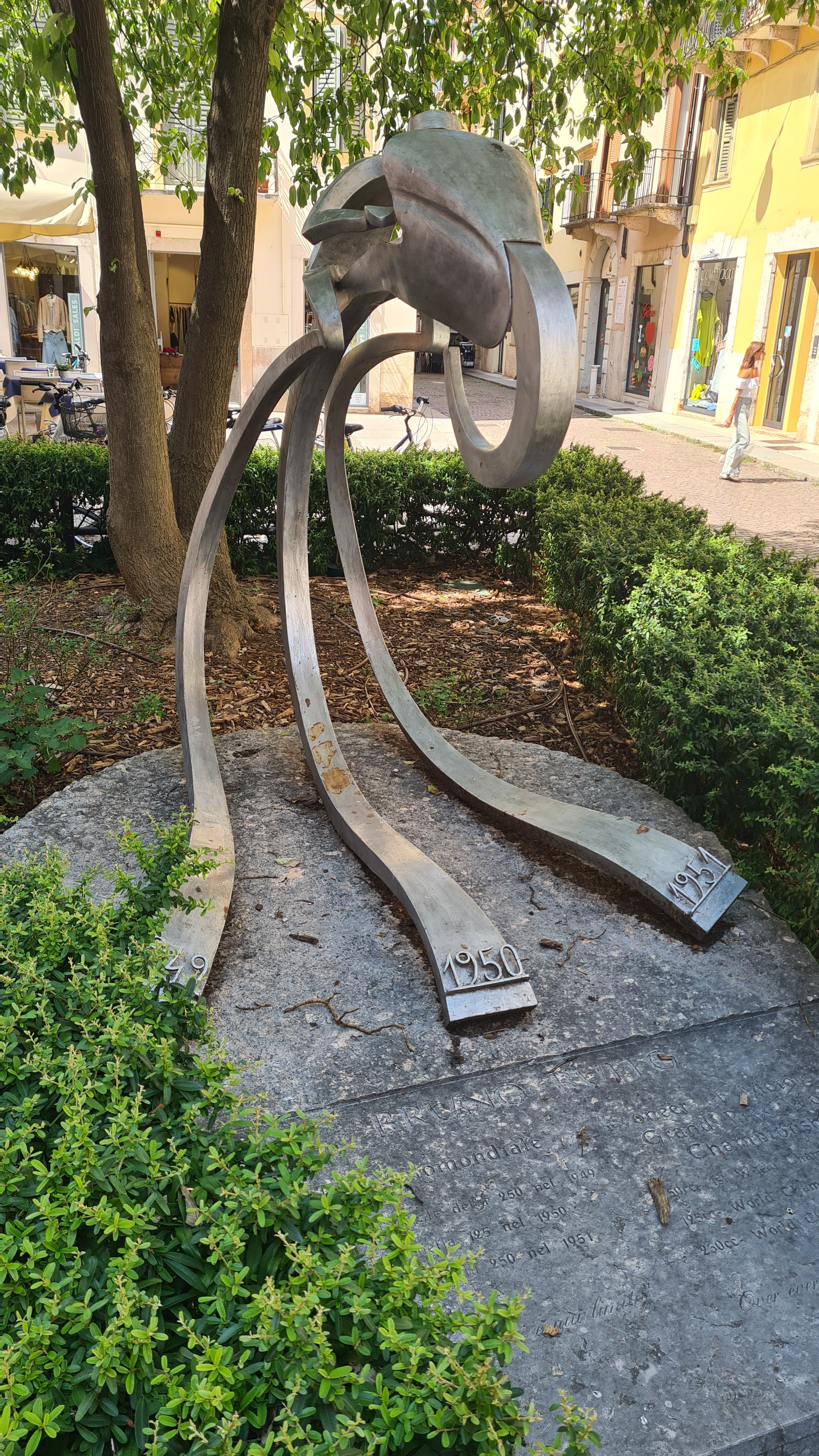
Bruno Ruffo pioneer of the MotoGP, First 250 World Champion in 1949, 125 World Champion in 1950, 250 World Champion in 1951. Beyond every limit there is no more limit. Your son Renzo.

In 2009, a monument in his memory, commissioned by his son Renzo Ruffo and sculpted by wrought iron artist Marco Da Ronco, was unveiled in his hometown, Verona, located between Via Roma and Vicolo Morette. The work consists of three main pieces in wrought iron, positioned on a marble plinth. The pieces assembled together represent a human figure on a racing motorcycle, captured in the fleeting moment of high-speed riding.

== Motorcycle Grand Prix results ==
1949 point system

Position	1	2	3	4	5	Fastest lap
Points	10	8	7	6	5	1

Points system from 1950 to 1968

Position	1	2	3	4	5	6
Points	8	6	4	3	2	1

5 best results were counted up until 1955.

(key) (Races in italics indicate fastest lap)

Year	Class	Team	1	2	3	4	5	6	7	8	Points	Rank	Wins
1949	250cc	Moto Guzzi	IOM -	SUI; 1	ULS; 2	NAT; 4					24	1st	1
1950	125cc	Mondial		NED; 1		ULS; 2	NAT; 4				17	1st	1
1950	250cc	Moto Guzzi	IOM -		SUI; 2	ULS -	NAT -				6	3rd	0
1951	250cc	Moto Guzzi	ESP -	SUI; 2	IOM -	BEL -	NED -	FRA; 1	ULS; 1	NAT; 3	22	1st	2
1951	500cc	Moto Guzzi	ESP -	SUI -	IOM -	BEL -	NED -	FRA -	ULS -	NAT; 5	2	19th	0
1952	250cc	Moto Guzzi	SUI -	IOM; 6	NED; 2	GER -	ULS -	NAT -			7	6th	0
