= Bill Doran (motorcyclist) =

British motorcycle racer

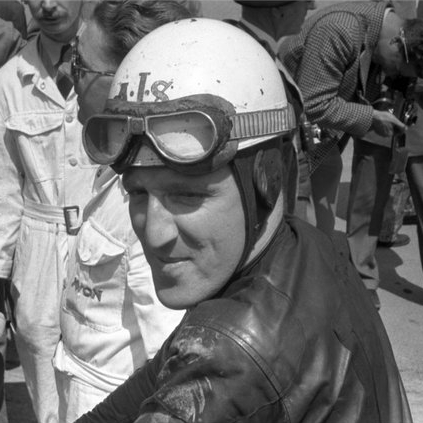
- Bill Doran at the 1952 Swiss GP
- Nationality: British
Motorcycle racing career statistics
Grand Prix motorcycle racing
Active years	1949, 1951 – 1953
First race	1949 350cc Swiss Grand Prix
Last race	1953 350cc Dutch TT
First win	1949 500cc Belgian Grand Prix
Last win	1951 350cc Dutch TT
Starts / Wins / Podiums / Poles / F. laps / Points; 21 / 2 / 8 / N/A / N/A / 75

William Doran (/ˈdɒrən/, 12 November 1916 – 9 September 1973) was an English professional Grand Prix motorcycle road racer. Born in Tottington near Bury in Lancashire, he started racing in 1946, finishing in 23rd position in his first Manx Grand Prix and placed second in the 1948 Senior TT race on private Nortons.

Doran became a works AJS rider from 1949, winning the 1949 Belgian Grand Prix on an AJS Porcupine, until his retirement after suffering a head injury in a serious crash in August 1953 at Rouen.

Doran's best season was in 1951 when he won the Dutch TT and finished the year second to Geoff Duke in the 350cc world championship. He won two Grand Prix races during his career.

Doran had part of the Isle of Man TT course named after him. He was proud because, at the time of dedication, he was the only living recipient with a named section. He crashed during a Thursday evening practice for the 1952 Isle of Man TT riding an AJS motorcycle resulting in a broken leg. The accident occurred on the left-hand bend after Ballig Bridge and was renamed Doran's Bend.

In late 1952 at the London Motorcycle Show, Doran approached the Italian company Gilera for a works ride for the 1953 season. However, in a letter dated November 27, 1952 Gilera replied to the request stating the positions on their team were filled for the coming season so Doran started the 1953 season on his now obsolete AJS scoring three points paying finishes before the career ending crash at Rouen.

After retirement from racing in 1954, Doran opened a motorcycle business in Wellington, Shropshire, with former AJS race-chief Matt Wright, selling new motorcycles collected from the Birmingham factories in a pick-up vehicle driven by Doran's wife Peggy, daughter of Herbert Ratcliffe, whom he married in 1955. Isetta and Messerschmitt three-wheelers were also collected from Luton airport.

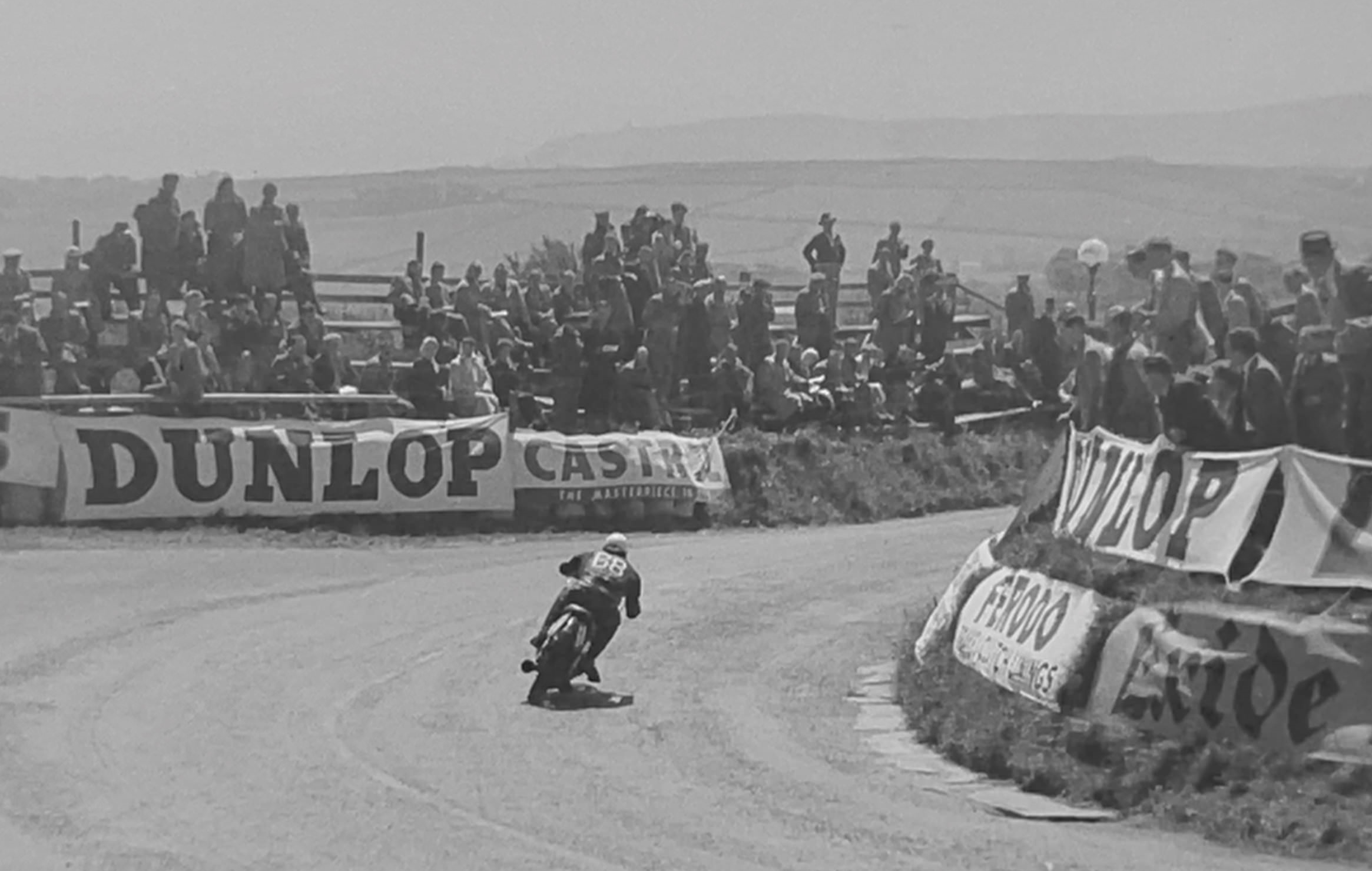
Bill Doran at Creg-ny-Baa, 1951 Isle of Man TT

Partner Matt Wright retired in 1967, and with the demise of the British Motorcycle manufacturers, most notably BSA in 1971, Doran developed the business into a Yamaha, Suzuki and Lambretta dealership in addition to a FIAT car dealership, car repairs and petrol sales, with the later acquisition of two further nearby sites.

Known physically by his jutting chin, Doran died of a heart attack at his home, Carn Brea, Station Road, Admaston, near Wellington in September 1973 aged 56. After a funeral service at Wrockwardine Parish Church on 14 September 1973, he was cremated at Emstrey Crematorium, Shrewsbury.

== Motorcycle Grand Prix results ==
1949 point system:

Position	1	2	3	4	5	Fastest lap
Points	10	8	7	6	5	1

Points system from 1950 to 1968:

Position	1	2	3	4	5	6
Points	8	6	4	3	2	1

5 best results were counted up until 1955.

(key) (Races in italics indicate fastest lap)

Year	Class	Team	1	2	3	4	5	6	7	8	9	Points	Rank	Wins
1949	350cc	AJS	IOM; NC	SUI; 3	NED -	BEL -	ULS -					7	10th	0
1949	500cc	AJS	IOM; 8	SUI -	NED -	BEL; 1	ULS; 4	NAT; 3				23	4th	1
1951	350cc	AJS	ESP -	SUI -	IOM; NC	BEL; 5	NED; 1	FRA; 3	ULS; 5	NAT; 4		19	2nd	1
1951	500cc	AJS	ESP -	SUI -	IOM; 2	BEL -	NED -	FRA; 2	ULS; 6	NAT; 6		14	4th	0
1952	500cc	AJS	SUI; 2	IOM -	NED -	BEL -	GER -	ULS -	NAT -	ESP -		6	12th	0
1953	350cc	AJS	IOM; 5	NED; 6	BEL -	GER -	FRA -	ULS -	SUI -	NAT -		3	14th	0
1953	500cc	AJS	IOM; 5	NED; 6	BEL -	GER -	FRA -	ULS -	SUI -	NAT -	ESP -	3	13th	0
