= Leslie Harris (motorcyclist) =

English motorcycle racer

Leslie Harris (c.1910 –1961) was a motorcyclist in the 1950 Grand Prix motorcycle racing season. He was from Hull.

Harris suffered a fractured skull during a race in Germany in 1950. He retired in 1952.

Harris was killed in a car accident in Scotland in 1961, aged 51.
