= 1949 Ulster Grand Prix =

Motorcycle race in Northern Ireland

(United Kingdom) 1949 Ulster Grand Prix
Race details
- Race 5 of 6 races in the 1949 Grand Prix motorcycle racing season
- Date: 20 August 1949
- Location: Clady Circuit
- Course: Public roads; 26.5 km (16.5 mi)

500cc
- Rider
Fastest lap
Rider	(United Kingdom) Leslie Graham	AJS
Time	10:06.0	
Podium
First	(United Kingdom) Leslie Graham	AJS
Second	(United Kingdom) Artie Bell	Norton
Third	(Italy) Nello Pagani	Gilera

350cc
- Rider
Fastest lap
Rider	(United Kingdom) Freddie Frith	Velocette
Time	10:56.0	
Podium
First	(United Kingdom) Freddie Frith	Velocette
Second	(United Kingdom) Charlie Salt	Velocette
Third	(Republic of Ireland) Reg Armstrong	AJS

250cc
- Rider
Fastest lap
Rider	(United Kingdom) Maurice Cann	Moto Guzzi
Time	12:01.6	
Podium
First	(United Kingdom) Maurice Cann	Moto Guzzi
Second	(Italy) Bruno Ruffo	Moto Guzzi
Third	(United Kingdom) Ronald Mead	Norton

The 1949 Ulster Grand Prix was the fifth round of the 1949 Grand Prix motorcycle racing season. It took place at the Clady Circuit.

British rider Leslie Graham riding an AJS won the 500 cc race from Artie Bell and Nello Pagani. The race victory for Graham, with Pagani only in third place, wrapped up the first world championship for Graham. Similarly AJS secured the constructor's title.

It was also the final race of the 350 cc title. British Velocette rider Freddie Frith was already world champion having achieved a perfect score and in winning the Ulster Grand Prix he completed a remarkable clean sweep, winning all five races of the championship.

== 500 cc classification ==
Pos	Rider	Manufacturer	Time	Points
1	(United Kingdom) Leslie Graham	AJS	2:34:05.4	11
2	(United Kingdom) Artie Bell	Norton	+1:39.0	8
3	(Italy) Nello Pagani	Gilera	+1:48.6	7
4	(United Kingdom) Bill Doran	AJS	+1:54.6	6
5	(United Kingdom) Jock West	AJS	+6:15.6	5
6	(Republic of Ireland) Rex McCandless	Norton	+14:41.6	

== 350 cc classification ==
Pos	Rider	Manufacturer	Time	Points
1	(United Kingdom) Freddie Frith	Velocette	2:24:34.8	11
2	(United Kingdom) Charlie Salt	Velocette	+31.4	8
3	(Republic of Ireland) Reg Armstrong	AJS	+39.6	7
4	(Australia) Eric McPherson	AJS	+1:21.4	6
5	(United Kingdom) Frank Fry	Velocette	+1:52.6	5
6	(United Kingdom) Dickie Dale	Norton	+4:38.8	
7	(Australia) Harry Hinton	Norton	+4:39.2	
8	(Republic of Ireland) Louis Carter	Norton	+4:49.2	
9	(United Kingdom) Les Dear	AJS	+6:12.4	
10	(United Kingdom) Arthur Wheeler	Velocette	+7:06.2	
11	(United Kingdom) Cyril Stevens	AJS	+7:25.2	
12	(United Kingdom) Bob Matthews	Velocette	+7:32.2	
13	(United Kingdom) Charlie Gray	AJS	+10:21.2	
14	(United Kingdom) Johnny Hodgkin	AJS	+10:22.4	
15	(United Kingdom) Syl Anderton	AJS	+11:00.2	
16	(United Kingdom) George Paterson	AJS	+11:01.2	
17	(United Kingdom) Syd Barnett	AJS	+12:30.2	
18	J. Hayes	AJS	+12:53.2	
19	(United Kingdom) Humphrey Ranson	AJS	+13:12.2	
20	C. B. Carr	Velocette	+13:13.2	
21	(United Kingdom) Joe Glazebrook	AJS	+14:08.2	
22	T. L. Irwin	Norton	+14:16.2	
23	N. Ferguson	AJS	+15:08.2	
24	T. F. Tindle	Velocette	+15:51.2	
25	J. S. Slater	AJS	+16:50.2	
26	J. Baillie	Velocette	+19:03.2	
27	A. E. Shaw	Velocette	+19:42.2	
28	R. E. Browne	AJS	+20:21.2	
29	R. H. Pilling	Velocette	+20:25.2	

== 250 cc classification ==
Pos	Rider	Manufacturer	Time	Points
1	(United Kingdom) Maurice Cann	Moto Guzzi	2:28:31.6	11
2	(Italy) Bruno Ruffo	Moto Guzzi	+2:07.4	8
3	(United Kingdom) Ronald Mead	Norton	+7:05.4	7
4	(United Kingdom) George Reeve	Excelsior	+10:45.4	6
5	(United Kingdom) Douglas Beasley	Excelsior	+11:59.4	5
6	(United Kingdom) William Dehaney	Excelsior	+12:53.4	
7	(United Kingdom) Chris Tattersall	CTS	+13:56.4	

Previous race: 1949 Belgian Grand Prix	FIM Grand Prix World Championship; 1949 season	Next race: 1949 Nations Grand Prix
Previous race: 1948 Ulster Grand Prix	Ulster Grand Prix	Next race: 1950 Ulster Grand Prix
