= 1950 Dutch TT =

1950 Grand Prix motorcycle race

(Netherlands) 1950 Dutch TT
Race details
- Race 3 of 6 races in the 1950 Grand Prix motorcycle racing season
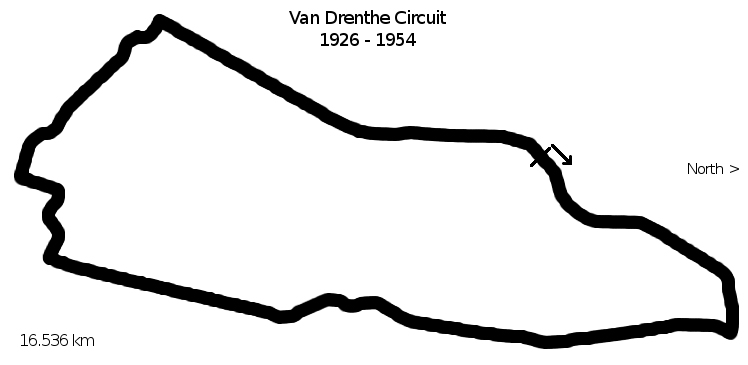
- Date: 8 July 1950
- Location: TT Circuit Assen
- Course: Permanent racing facility; 16.536 km (10.275 mi)

500cc
Fastest lap
Rider	(Italy) Carlo Bandirola	Gilera
Time	6:26.9	
Podium
First	(Italy) Umberto Masetti	Gilera
Second	(Italy) Nello Pagani	Gilera
Third	(Australia) Harry Hinton	Norton

350cc
Fastest lap
Rider	(United Kingdom) Bob Foster	Velocette
Time	6:51.0	
Podium
First	(United Kingdom) Bob Foster	Velocette
Second	(United Kingdom) Geoff Duke	Norton
Third	(United Kingdom) Bill Lomas	Velocette

125cc
Fastest lap
Rider	(Italy) Bruno Ruffo	Mondial
Time	8:07.2	
Podium
First	(Italy) Bruno Ruffo	Mondial
Second	(Italy) Gianni Leoni	Mondial
Third	(Italy) Giuseppe Mattuci	Moto Morini

The 1950 Dutch TT was the third race of the 1950 Grand Prix motorcycle racing season. It took place on the weekend of 8 July 1950 at the TT Circuit Assen.

== 500 cc classification ==
Pos	Rider	Manufacturer	Laps	Time	Points
1	(Italy) Umberto Masetti	Gilera	18	2:00:43.2	8
2	(Italy) Nello Pagani	Gilera	18	+32.8	6
3	(Australia) Harry Hinton	Norton	18	+2:17.8	4
4	(Italy) Carlo Bandirola	Gilera	18	+3:47.7	3
5	(Australia) Eric McPherson	Norton	18	+6:32.8	2
6	(New Zealand) Syd Jensen	Triumph			1

== 350 cc classification ==
Pos	Rider	Manufacturer	Laps	Time	Points
1	(United Kingdom) Bob Foster	Velocette	15	1:44:23.7	8
2	(United Kingdom) Geoff Duke	Norton	15	+32.4	6
3	(United Kingdom) Bill Lomas	Velocette	15	+1:36.6	4
4	(United Kingdom) Johnny Lockett	Norton	15	+2:36.2	3
5	(Republic of Ireland) Reg Armstrong	Velocette	15	+2:53.1	2
6	(Australia) Harry Hinton	Norton	15	+2:53.3	1
7	(United Kingdom) Dickie Dale	Norton	15	+2:58.5	
8	(United Kingdom) Ted Frend	AJS	15	+3:58.0	
9	(United Kingdom) Charlie Salt	Velocette	15	+4:19.7	
10	(United Kingdom) Vic Willoughby	Velocette	15	+6:34.1	

== 125cc classification ==
Pos.	Rider	Manufacturer	Laps	Time/Retired	Points
1	(Italy) Bruno Ruffo	Mondial	7	57:27.2	8
2	(Italy) Gianni Leoni	Mondial	7	+0.1	6
3	(Italy) Giuseppe Matucci	Moto Morini	7	+1:56.6	4
4	(Italy) Umberto Braga	Mondial	7	+5:48.5	3
5	(Italy) Felice Benasedo	MV Agusta	7	+8:27.6	2
6	(Netherlands) Gijs Lagerweij	Sparta	6	+1 lap	1
26 starters, 18 finishers

Previous race: 1950 Belgian Grand Prix	FIM Grand Prix World Championship; 1950 season	Next race: 1950 Swiss Grand Prix
Previous race: 1949 Dutch TT	Dutch TT	Next race: 1951 Dutch TT
