= 1950 Swiss motorcycle Grand Prix =

(Switzerland) 1950 Swiss Grand Prix
Race details
- Race 4 of 6 races in the 1950 Grand Prix motorcycle racing season
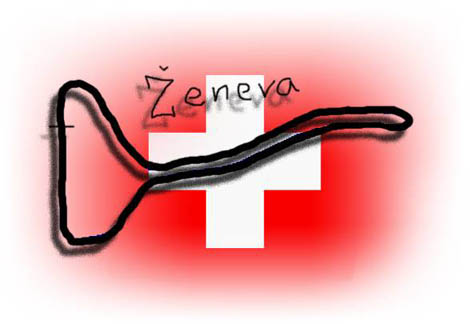
- Date: 23 July 1950
- Location: Geneva, Switzerland
- Course: Public roads; 5.996 km (3.726 mi)

500cc
Fastest lap
Rider	(Italy) Carlo Bandirola	Gilera
Time	2:42	
Podium
First	(United Kingdom) Leslie Graham	AJS
Second	(Italy) Umberto Masetti	Gilera
Third	(Italy) Carlo Bandirola	Gilera

350cc
Fastest lap
Rider	(United Kingdom) Bob Foster	Velocette
Time	2:39	
Podium
First	(United Kingdom) Leslie Graham	AJS
Second	(United Kingdom) Bob Foster	Velocette
Third	(United Kingdom) Geoff Duke	Norton

250cc
Fastest lap
Rider	(Italy) Dario Ambrosini	Benelli
Time	2:52.2	
Podium
First	(Italy) Dario Ambrosini	Benelli
Second	(Italy) Bruno Ruffo	Moto Guzzi
Third	(United Kingdom) Dickie Dale	Benelli

Sidecar (B2A)
Fastest lap
Rider	(United Kingdom) Eric Oliver	Norton
Passenger	(Italy) Lorenzo Dobelli	
Time	3:04.2	
Podium
First rider	(United Kingdom) Eric Oliver	Norton
First passenger	(Italy) Lorenzo Dobelli	
Second rider	(Italy) Ercole Frigerio	Gilera
Second passenger	(Italy) Ezio Ricotti	
Third rider	(Switzerland) Ferdinand Aubert	Norton
Third passenger	(Switzerland) René Aubert	

The 1950 Swiss motorcycle Grand Prix was the fourth race of the 1950 Grand Prix motorcycle racing season. It took place on the weekend of 23 July 1950 in Geneva.

== 500 cc classification ==
Pos	Rider	Manufacturer	Laps	Time	Points
1	(United Kingdom) Leslie Graham	AJS	34	1:36:57	8
2	(Italy) Umberto Masetti	Gilera	34	+1:14	6
3	(Italy) Carlo Bandirola	Gilera	34	+1:15	4
4	(United Kingdom) Geoff Duke	Norton	34	+1:44	3
5	(United Kingdom) Harold Daniell	Norton			2
6	(United Kingdom) Johnny Lockett	Norton			1
7	(Switzerland) Georges Cordey	Norton			
8	(Republic of Ireland) Reg Armstrong	Velocette			
9	(France) Georges Houel	Gilera			
10	(Italy) Nello Pagani	Gilera			
11	(United Kingdom) Albert Moule	Norton			
12	(Italy) Arciso Artesiani	MV Agusta			
13	(Switzerland) Benoît Musy	Moto Guzzi			
14	(Switzerland) Hans Haldemann	Norton			
15	(New Zealand) Jim Swarbrick	Norton			
16	(Switzerland) Willy Lips	Norton			
17	(United Kingdom) Denis Jenkinson	Norton			
18	(United Kingdom) Phil Heath	Norton			

== 350 cc classification ==
Pos	Rider	Manufacturer	Laps	Time	Points
1	(United Kingdom) Leslie Graham	AJS	25	1:11:25	8
2	(United Kingdom) Bob Foster	Velocette	25	+0:18	6
2	(Italy) Umberto Masetti	Gilera	34	+1:14	6
3	(United Kingdom) Geoff Duke	Norton	25	+0:47	4
4	(Republic of Ireland) Reg Armstrong	Velocette	25	+1:04	3
5	(United Kingdom) Ted Frend	AJS	25	+1:12	2
6	(United Kingdom) Dickie Dale	AJS	25	+1:12	1
7	(Australia) Harry Hinton	Norton	25	+1:46	
8	(United Kingdom) Bill Lomas	Velocette	25	+1:48	
9	(United Kingdom) Harold Daniell	Norton	25	+1:49	
10	(United Kingdom) Johnny Lockett	Norton			
11	(United Kingdom) Tommy Wood	Velocette			
12	(New Zealand) Syd Jensen	AJS			
13	(Finland) Väinö Hollming	AJS			
14	(United Kingdom) Fergus Anderson	AJS			
15	(United Kingdom) Phil Heath	Norton			
16	(Australia) Eric McPherson	AJS			
17	(United Kingdom) Ernie Thomas	Velocette			
18	(Switzerland) Heinrich Stamm	Velocette			
19	(United Kingdom) Bill Beevers	Velocette			
20	J. Zuber	Norton			
21	(Switzerland) Willy Lips	Norton			
22	(Switzerland) Arthur Wick	AJS			

== 250 cc classification ==
Pos	Rider	Manufacturer	Laps	Time	Points
1	(Italy) Dario Ambrosini	Benelli	21	1:01:48.2	8
2	(Italy) Bruno Ruffo	Moto Guzzi	21	+47.4	6
3	(United Kingdom) Dickie Dale	Benelli	21	+57.8	4
4	(Switzerland) Benoît Musy	Moto Guzzi	21	+2:42.8	3
5	(Italy) Carlo Bellotti	Moto Guzzi			2
6	(Italy) Onorato Francone	Moto Guzzi			1
7	(Italy) Roberto Colombo	Moto Guzzi			
8	(Italy) Elio Scopigno	Moto Guzzi			
9	(Italy) Claudio Mastellari	Moto Guzzi			

== Sidecar classification ==
Pos	Rider	Passenger	Manufacturer	Laps	Time	Points
1	(United Kingdom) Eric Oliver	(Italy) Lorenzo Dobelli	Norton	17	52:59.8	8
2	(Italy) Ercole Frigerio	(Italy) Ezio Ricotti	Gilera	17	+40.0	6
3	(Switzerland) Ferdinand Aubert	(Switzerland) René Aubert	Norton	17	+2:34.8	4
4	(Switzerland) Henri Meuwly	(Switzerland) Pierre Dévaud	Gilera			3
5	(Switzerland) Willy Wirth	(Switzerland) Fred Schürtenberger	Gilera			2
6	(Belgium) Marcel Masuy	(United Kingdom) Denis Jenkinson	BMW			1
7	(Switzerland) Hans Haldemann	(Switzerland) Josef Albisser	Norton			
8	(Switzerland) Heinrich Stamm	?	Norton			
9	(France) Edouard Hordelalay	?	Norton			
10	(Switzerland) Fritz Mühlemann	(Switzerland) Marie Mühlemann	Norton			

Previous race: 1950 Dutch TT	FIM Grand Prix World Championship; 1950 season	Next race: 1950 Ulster Grand Prix
Previous race: 1949 Swiss Grand Prix	Swiss motorcycle Grand Prix	Next race: 1951 Swiss Grand Prix
