= 1950 Ulster Grand Prix =

Motorcycle race in Northern Ireland

Race details
- Race 5 of 6 races in the 1950 Grand Prix motorcycle racing season
- Date: 19 August 1950
- Location: Clady Circuit
- Course: Public roads; 26.5 km (16.5 mi)

500cc
Fastest lap
Rider	(United Kingdom) Geoff Duke	Norton
Time	9:44	
Podium
First	(United Kingdom) Geoff Duke	Norton
Second	(United Kingdom) Leslie Graham	AJS
Third	(United Kingdom) Johnny Lockett	Norton

350cc
Fastest lap
Rider	(United Kingdom) Bob Foster	Velocette
Time	10:40	
Podium
First	(United Kingdom) Bob Foster	Velocette
Second	(Republic of Ireland) Reg Armstrong	Velocette
Third	(Australia) Harry Hinton	Norton

250cc
Fastest lap
Rider	(United Kingdom) Maurice Cann	Moto Guzzi
Time	11:46	
Podium
First	(United Kingdom) Maurice Cann	Moto Guzzi
Second	(Italy) Dario Ambrosini	Benelli
Third	(United Kingdom) Wilf Billington	Moto Guzzi

125cc
Fastest lap
Rider	(Italy) Carlo Ubbiali	Mondial
Time	12:33.0	
Podium
First	(Italy) Carlo Ubbiali	Mondial
Second	(Italy) Bruno Ruffo	Mondial
Third	No third place finisher.	

The 1950 Ulster Grand Prix was the fifth round of the 1950 Grand Prix motorcycle racing season. It took place on 19 August 1950 at the Clady Circuit. The races for all four classes were run concurrently with each other, with each class being dispatched with a mass start at one-minute intervals (starting with the 500cc class and ending with the 125cc class).

== 500 cc classification ==
Pos	Rider	Manufacturer	Laps	Time	Points
1	(United Kingdom) Geoff Duke	Norton	15	2:29:15	8
2	(United Kingdom) Leslie Graham	AJS	15	+57.6	6
3	(United Kingdom) Johnny Lockett	Norton	15	+1:39.6	4
4	(United Kingdom) Dickie Dale	Norton	15	+3:55	3
5	(United Kingdom) Jock West	AJS	15	+9:31	2
6	(Italy) Umberto Masetti	Gilera	15	+13:25	1
7	(Italy) Nello Pagani	Gilera	15	+13:34	
8	(United Kingdom) Phil Heath	Norton			
9	(United Kingdom) Tom Turner	Norton			
10	(United Kingdom) E. A. Barrett	Norton			
11	J. F. Kentish	Norton			
12	F. Fairbairn	Vincent			
13	E. Braine	Norton			

== 350 cc classification ==
Pos	Rider	Manufacturer	Laps	Time	Points
1	(United Kingdom) Bob Foster	Velocette	14	2:20:55.6	8
2	(Republic of Ireland) Reg Armstrong	Velocette	14	+12.4	6
3	(Australia) Harry Hinton	Norton	14	+1:15.4	4
4	(Australia) Eric McPherson	AJS	14	+2:00.8	3
5	(United Kingdom) Cecil Sandford	AJS	14	+3:23.4	2
6	(United Kingdom) Harold Daniell	Norton	14	+3:24.4	1
7	(Republic of Ireland) Louis Carter	Gilera	15	+5:58.4	
8	(United Kingdom) Charlie Gray	AJS	15	+7:20.0	
9	(United Kingdom) Les Dear	AJS			
10	(United Kingdom) Arthur Wheeler	Velocette			
11	A. J. Glazebrook	AJS			
12	A. W. McGaffin	AJS			
13	G. H. Morgan	Velocette			
14	J. S. Slater	AJS			
15	E. R. Evans	BSA			
16	Syl Anderton	AJS			
17	(United Kingdom) John Simister	AJS			
18	M. Klein	AJS			
19	R. Macdonald	AJS			
20	E. V. C. Hardy	Norton			
21	(United Kingdom) Dennis Lashmar	Velocette			
22	(United Kingdom) Bob Browne	AJS			
23	C. B. Carr	Velocette			
24	R. D. McConnell	AJS			
25	S. Towers	AJS			
26	W. J. Spratt	Norton			
27	G. Brockerton	Norton			
28	W. G. Job	AJS			
29	S. B. Gifford	Velocette			

== 250 cc classification ==
Pos	Rider	Manufacturer	Laps	Time	Points
1	(United Kingdom) Maurice Cann	Moto Guzzi	12	2:23:41	8
2	(Italy) Dario Ambrosini	Benelli	12	+8:22	6
3	(United Kingdom) Wilf Billington	Moto Guzzi	12	+9:25	4
4	(United Kingdom) Arthur Burton	Excelsior	12	+11:34	3
5	G. Andrews	Excelsior			2
6	(United Kingdom) William Campbell	Excelsior			1
7	(United Kingdom) Chris Tattersall	CTS			
8	(United Kingdom) Norman Webb	Excelsior			
9	(United Kingdom) Frank Cope	AJS			

== 125cc classification ==
Pos.	Rider	Manufacturer	Laps	Time/Retired	Points
1	(Italy) Carlo Ubbiali	Mondial	10	2:07:53.0	8
2	(Italy) Bruno Ruffo	Mondial	10	+1:05.0	6
3 starters, 2 finishers

Previous race: 1950 Swiss Grand Prix	FIM Grand Prix World Championship; 1950 season	Next race: 1950 Nations Grand Prix
Previous race: 1949 Ulster Grand Prix	Ulster Grand Prix	Next race: 1951 Ulster Grand Prix
