= Syl Anderton =

British motorcycle racer

Sylvanus Anderton, better known as Syl Anderton, (1907–1983) was a British motorcycle dealer and Grand Prix motorcycle racer.

Syl and his brother James Anderton founded Anderton Bros. Motor Cycles Ltd. in Bolton, Lancashire in 1935. Both brothers qualified as pilots before the war and Syl served as a pilot in the Air Transport Auxiliary during World War II and James in the RAF. The brothers resumed their family motorcycle business after the war. Anderton began his racing career before World War II. In 1949, he competed in his first Isle of Man TT event with brother James in the pits. He also competed in the Ulster Grand Prix from 1949 to 1951, riding Triumph and Norton motorcycles between 1949 and 1952. He was also known as a private pilot, owning an Auster Aiglet Trainer. He died in 1983 in Bolton, Lancashire, England.

== See also ==
- 1949 Grand Prix motorcycle racing season
- 1950 Grand Prix motorcycle racing season
- 1951 Grand Prix motorcycle racing season
- 1952 Grand Prix motorcycle racing season
