= 1950 Nations motorcycle Grand Prix =

(Italy) 1950 Nations Grand Prix
Race details
- Race 6 of 6 races in the 1950 Grand Prix motorcycle racing season
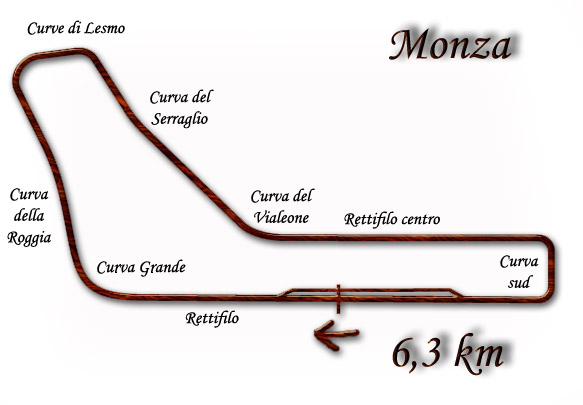
- Date: 10 September 1950
- Location: Autodromo Nazionale Monza
- Course: Permanent racing facility; 6.292 km (3.910 mi)

500cc
Fastest lap
Rider	(Italy) Umberto Masetti	Gilera
Time	2:13.4	
Podium
First	(United Kingdom) Geoff Duke	Norton
Second	(Italy) Umberto Masetti	Gilera
Third	(Italy) Arciso Artesiani	MV Agusta

350cc
Fastest lap
Rider	(Australia) Harry Hinton	Norton
Time	2:25.0	
Podium
First	(United Kingdom) Geoff Duke	Norton
Second	(United Kingdom) Leslie Graham	AJS
Third	(Australia) Harry Hinton	Norton

250cc
Fastest lap
Rider	(Italy) Dario Ambrosini	Benelli
Time	2:31.0	
Podium
First	(Italy) Dario Ambrosini	Benelli
Second	(United Kingdom) Fergus Anderson	Moto Guzzi
Third	(Italy) Bruno Francisci	Benelli

125cc
Fastest lap
Rider	(Italy) Carlo Ubbiali	Mondial
Time	2:47.2	
Podium
First	(Italy) Gianni Leoni	Mondial
Second	(Italy) Carlo Ubbiali	Mondial
Third	(Italy) Luigi Zinzani	Moto Morini

Sidecar (B2A)
Fastest lap
Rider	(United Kingdom) Eric Oliver (Italy) Ercole Frigerio	Norton; Gilera
Passenger	(Italy) Lorenzo Dobelli (Italy) Ezio Ricotti	
Time	2:40.4	
Podium
First rider	(United Kingdom) Eric Oliver	Norton
First passenger	(Italy) Lorenzo Dobelli	
Second rider	(Italy) Ercole Frigerio	Gilera
Second passenger	(Italy) Ezio Ricotti	
Third rider	(Switzerland) Hans Haldemann	Norton
Third passenger	(Switzerland) Josef Albisser	

The 1950 Nations motorcycle Grand Prix was the sixth and final round of the 1950 Grand Prix motorcycle racing season. It took place on 10 September 1950 at the Autodromo Nazionale Monza.

== 500 cc classification ==
Pos	Rider	Manufacturer	Laps	Time	Points
1	(United Kingdom) Geoff Duke	Norton	31	1:11:06.6	8
2	(Italy) Umberto Masetti	Gilera	31	+50.4	6
3	(Italy) Arciso Artesiani	MV Agusta	31	+1:36.4	4
4	(Italy) Alfredo Milani	Gilera	31	+1:36.8	3
5	(Italy) Carlo Bandirola	Gilera	31	+1:59.6	2
6	(United Kingdom) Dickie Dale	Norton	31	+2:00.2	1
7	(United Kingdom) Leslie Graham	AJS	31	+2:04.4	
8	(United Kingdom) Johnny Lockett	Norton	31	+2:21.8	
9	(Italy) Giuseppe Colnago	Gilera	30		
10	(United Kingdom) Harold Daniell	Norton	30		
11	(United Kingdom) Ted Frend	AJS	30		
12	(Italy) Guido Leoni	MV Agusta	29		
13	(Italy) Armando Miele	Gilera	29		
14	(Italy) Dante Bianchi	Moto Guzzi	29		
15	(United Kingdom) Bob Foster	AJS	29		
16	(France) Georges Monneret	Norton	28		
17	(Belgium) Auguste Goffin	Norton	28		
18	(Switzerland) Benoît Musy	Moto Guzzi	28		
19	(Italy) Adelmo Mandolini	Moto Guzzi	28		
20	(Italy) Lodovico Facchinelli	Gilera	27		
21	(Italy) Libero Liberati	Moto Guzzi	27		
22	(Italy) Dario Basso	Gilera	27		

== 350 cc classification ==
Pos	Rider	Manufacturer	Laps	Time	Points
1	(United Kingdom) Geoff Duke	Norton	24	59:18.0	8
2	(United Kingdom) Leslie Graham	AJS	24	+1.0	6
3	(Australia) Harry Hinton	Norton	24	+1.4	4
4	(United Kingdom) Dickie Dale	Norton	24	+7.0	3
5	(United Kingdom) Bill Lomas	Velocette	24	+1:02.6	2
6	(United Kingdom) Cecil Sandford	AJS	24	+1:05.2	1
7	(Republic of Ireland) Reg Armstrong	Velocette	24	+1:05.6	
8	(United Kingdom) Ted Frend	AJS	24	+1:50.6	
9	(United Kingdom) Tommy Wood	Velocette	24	+1:50.8	
10	(France) Georges Monneret	AJS	23		
11	(United Kingdom) Bob Matthews	Norton	23		
12	(France) Pierre Monneret	AJS	23		
13	(United Kingdom) Ernie Thomas	Velocette	23		
14	(United Kingdom) Eric Oliver	Velocette			
15	(Finland) Väinö Hollming	Velocette			

== 250 cc classification ==
Pos	Rider	Manufacturer	Laps	Time	Points
1	(Italy) Dario Ambrosini	Benelli	32	1:23:03.6	8
2	(United Kingdom) Fergus Anderson	Moto Guzzi	32	+58.2	6
3	(Italy) Bruno Francisci	Benelli	32	+1:28.2	4
4	(Italy) Claudio Mastellari	Moto Guzzi	32	+2:28.4	3
5	(Italy) Alano Montanari	Moto Guzzi	31		2
6	(Italy) Ugo Plebani	Moto Guzzi	31		1
7	(Italy) Elio Scopigno	Moto Guzzi	31		
8	(Italy) Armando Miele	Benelli	31		
9	(Italy) Onorato Francone	Moto Guzzi	30		
10	(Italy) Ernaldo Casprini	Moto Guzzi	30		
11	(Italy) Luigi Falconi	Moto Guzzi	30		
12	(Italy) Lanfranco Baviera	Moto Guzzi	29		

== 125cc classification ==
Pos.	Rider	Manufacturer	Laps	Time/Retired	Points
1	(Italy) Gianni Leoni	Mondial	16	45:44.8	8
2	(Italy) Carlo Ubbiali	Mondial	16	+0.6	6
3	(Italy) Luigi Zinzani	Moto Morini	16	+0.8	4
4	(Italy) Bruno Ruffo	Mondial	16	+1:00.0	3
5	(Italy) Raffaele Alberti	Mondial	16	+1:00.6	2
6	(Italy) Emilio Soprani	Moto Morini	16	+2:36.4	1
7	(Italy) Romolo Ferri	Moto Morini	15		
8	(Italy) Franco Bertoni	MV Agusta	15		
9	(Italy) Renato Magi	MV Agusta	14		
10	(Italy) Antonio Ronchei	MV Agusta	14		
11	(Netherlands) Wim Zijlaard	MV Agusta	14		
12	(Italy) Carlo Poggi	MV Agusta	14		
13	(Italy) Vittorio Lucchi	MV Agusta	13		
21 starters, 13 finishers

== Sidecar classification ==
Pos	Rider	Passenger	Manufacturer	Laps	Time	Points
1	(United Kingdom) Eric Oliver	(Italy) Lorenzo Dobelli	Norton	16	43:43.4	8
2	(Italy) Ercole Frigerio	(Italy) Ezio Ricotti	Gilera	16	+2:03.6	6
3	(Switzerland) Hans Haldemann	(Switzerland) Josef Albisser	Norton	16	+2:25.0	4
4	(Switzerland) Jakob Keller	(Switzerland) Gianfranco Zanzi	Gilera			3
5	(Italy) Ernesto Merlo	(Italy) Dino Magri	Gilera			2
6	(Switzerland) Fritz Mühlemann	(Switzerland) Marie Mühlemann	Norton			1
7	(Switzerland) Henri Meuwly	(Switzerland) Pierre Devaud	Gilera			
8	(Italy) Aldo del Corno	(Italy) ?	Moto Guzzi			
9	(Italy) Roberto Besana	(Italy) ?	Triumph			
10	(Switzerland) Willy Wirth	(Switzerland) Fredy Schürtenberger	Gilera			
11	(Belgium) Julien Deronne	(Belgium) Johnny Anthony	Norton			
12	(Italy) Luigi Marcelli	(Italy) ?	Gilera			
13	(Italy) Carlo Vittone	(Italy) ?	Carru			
14	(Belgium) Marcel Masuy	(United Kingdom) Denis Jenkinson	BMW			
15	(Italy) Giovanni Poggi	(Italy) ?	Guzzi			

Previous race: 1950 Ulster Grand Prix	FIM Grand Prix World Championship; 1950 season	Next race: 1951 Spanish Grand Prix
Previous race: 1949 Nations Grand Prix	Nations Grand Prix	Next race: 1951 Nations Grand Prix
