= Bruno Bertacchini =

Italian motorcycle racer

- Nationality: Italian
- Born: 1916; Italy
- Died: 2003 (aged 86–87)

Bruno Bertacchini (1916–2003) was a Grand Prix motorcycle racer from Italy. In April 1948, he won the Italian championships at Monza, riding a Moto Guzzi 500 Bicilindrica. Bertacchini later rode a Moto Guzzi 500 Twin 1951.

== Career statistics ==
=== By season ===
Season	Class	Motorcycle	Race	Win	Podium	Pole	FLap	Pts	Plcd
1949	500cc	Moto Guzzi	1	0	0	0	0	5	11th
Total			1	0	0	0	0	5	
