= Felice Benasedo =

Italian motorcycle racer (1922–2016)

- Nationality: (Italy) Italian
- Born: 6 May 1922; Monza, Italy
- Died: 10 January 2016 (aged 93); Monza, Italy
Motorcycle racing career statistics
Grand Prix motorcycle racing
Active years	1949 - 1953
First race	1949 500cc Nations Grand Prix
Last race	1953 500cc Nations Grand Prix
Team(s)	Moto Guzzi, MV Agusta
Starts / Wins / Podiums / Poles / F. laps / Points; 10 / 0 / 0 / 0 / 0 / 2

Felice Giuseppe Benasedo (6 May 1922 - 10 January 2016) was an Italian former Grand Prix motorcycle road racer from Italy. He had his best season in 1950 when he finished in seventh place in the 125cc world championship.

== Career statistics ==
=== By season ===
Season	Class	Motorcycle	Race	Win	Podium	Pole	FLap	Pts	Plcd
1950	125cc	MV Agusta	1	0	0	0	0	2	7th
Total			1	0	0	0	0	2	
