= 1949 Swiss motorcycle Grand Prix =

(Switzerland) 1949 Swiss Grand Prix
Race details
- Race 2 of 6 races in the 1949 Grand Prix motorcycle racing season
- Date: 3 July 1949
- Location: Circuit Bremgarten
- Course: Permanent racing facility; 7.280 km (4.524 mi)

500cc
Pole position
Rider	(United Kingdom) Ted Frend	AJS
Time	3:00.100	
Fastest lap
Rider	(United Kingdom) Ted Frend	AJS
Time	3:00.800	
Podium
First	(United Kingdom) Leslie Graham	AJS
Second	(Italy) Arciso Artesiani	Gilera
Third	(United Kingdom) Harold Daniell	Norton

350cc
Pole position
Rider	(Republic of Ireland) Reg Armstrong	AJS
Time	3:10.600	
Fastest lap
Rider	(United Kingdom) Freddie Frith	Velocette
Time	3:07.800	
Podium
First	(United Kingdom) Freddie Frith	Velocette
Second	(United Kingdom) Leslie Graham	AJS
Third	(United Kingdom) Bill Doran	AJS

250cc
Pole position
Rider	(Italy) Ferdinando Balzarotti	Moto Guzzi
Time	3:06.700	
Fastest lap
Rider	(United Kingdom) Fergus Anderson	Moto Guzzi
Time	3:12.900	
Podium
First	(Italy) Bruno Ruffo	Moto Guzzi
Second	(Italy) Dario Ambrosini	Benelli
Third	(United Kingdom) Fergus Anderson	Moto Guzzi

125cc
Pole position
Rider	(Italy) Renato Magi	Morini
Time	3:42.700	
Fastest lap
Rider	(Italy) Nello Pagani	FB-Mondial
Time	3:42.500	
Podium
First	(Italy) Nello Pagani	FB-Mondial
Second	(Italy) Renato Magi	Morini
Third	(Italy) Celest Cavaciuti	FB-Mondial

Sidecar (B2A)
Pole position
Rider	(United Kingdom) Eric Oliver	Norton
Time	3:32.900	
Fastest lap
Rider	(United Kingdom) Eric Oliver	Norton
Time	3:35.700	
Podium
First	(United Kingdom) Eric Oliver	Norton
Second	(Italy) Ercole Frigerio	Gilera
Third	(Switzerland) Hans Haldemann	Norton

The 1949 Swiss motorcycle Grand Prix was the second race of the 1949 Motorcycle Grand Prix season. It took place on the weekend of 3 July 1949 at the Bremgarten circuit.

British rider Leslie Graham won the 500cc race riding an AJS from Arciso Artesiani and Harold Daniell.

== 500 cc classification ==
Pos	Rider	Manufacturer	Time	Points
1	(United Kingdom) Leslie Graham	AJS	1:26:14.9	11
2	(Italy) Arciso Artesiani	Gilera	+1:21.9	8
3	(United Kingdom) Harold Daniell	Norton	+1:32.0	7
4	(Italy) Nello Pagani	Gilera	+2:15.0	6
5	(United Kingdom) Freddie Frith	Velocette		5
6	(Italy) Guido Leoni	Moto Guzzi		
7	(United Kingdom) Ken Bills	Velocette		
7 finishers

== 350 cc classification ==
Pos	Rider	Manufacturer	Time	Points
1	(United Kingdom) Freddie Frith	Velocette	1:07:06.0	11
2	(United Kingdom) Leslie Graham	AJS	+3.9	8
3	(United Kingdom) Bill Doran	AJS	+4.1	7
4	(Republic of Ireland) Reg Armstrong	AJS	+22.2	6
5	(United Kingdom) Tommy Wood	Velocette	+30.8	5
6	(United Kingdom) Artie Bell	Norton	+31.0	
20 finishers

== 250 cc classification ==
Pos	Rider	Manufacturer	Points
1	(Italy) Bruno Ruffo	Moto Guzzi	10
2	(Italy) Dario Ambrosini	Benelli	8
3	(United Kingdom) Fergus Anderson	Moto Guzzi	8
4	(Italy) Claudio Mastellari	Moto Guzzi	6
5	(Switzerland) Benoit Musy	Moto Guzzi	5
6	(United Kingdom) Tommy Wood	Moto Guzzi	

== 125cc classification ==
Pos	Rider	Manufacturer	Laps	Time/Retired	Points
1	(Italy) Nello Pagani	FB-Mondial	14	53:12.4	11 (Note: Includes one point for fastest lap.)
2	(Italy) Renato Magi	Morini	14	+1:53.7	8
3	(Italy) Celeste Cavaciuti	FB-Mondial	14	+3:17.0	7
4	(Italy) Carlo Ubbiali	MV Agusta	14	+3:18.0	6
5	(Italy) Umberto Masetti	Morini	14	+3:18.6	5
6	(Italy) Franco Bertoni	MV Agusta			
17 starters, 15 finishers

== Sidecar classification ==
Pos	Rider	Passenger	Manufacturer	Time	Points
1	(United Kingdom) Eric Oliver	(United Kingdom) Denis Jenkinson	Norton	58:54.0	11
2	(Italy) Ercole Frigerio	(Italy) Ezio Ricotti	Gilera	+46.6	8
3	(Switzerland) Hans Haldemann	(Switzerland) Herbert Läderach	Norton	+47.0	7
4	(Switzerland) Jakob Keller	(Switzerland) Ernst Brutschi	Gilera	+2:17.5	6
5	(Italy) Albino Milani	(Italy) Giuseppe Pizzocri	Gilera	+3:03.7	5
6	(Switzerland) Roland Benz	(Switzerland) Max Hirzel	BMW	+3:04.7	
7	(Switzerland) Fritz Mühlemann	(Switzerland) Marie Mühlemann	Norton		
8	(Switzerland) Hans Taveri	(Switzerland) Luigi Taveri	Norton		
9	(Austria) Julius Beer	?	Norton		
10	(Switzerland) Willy Wirth		Gilera		

== Notes ==
Previous race: 1949 Isle of Man TT	FIM Grand Prix World Championship; 1949 season	Next race: 1949 Dutch TT
Previous race: None	Swiss motorcycle Grand Prix	Next race: 1950 Swiss Grand Prix
