= 1949 Dutch TT =

(Netherlands) 1949 Dutch TT
Race details
- Race 3 of 6 races in the 1949 Grand Prix motorcycle racing season
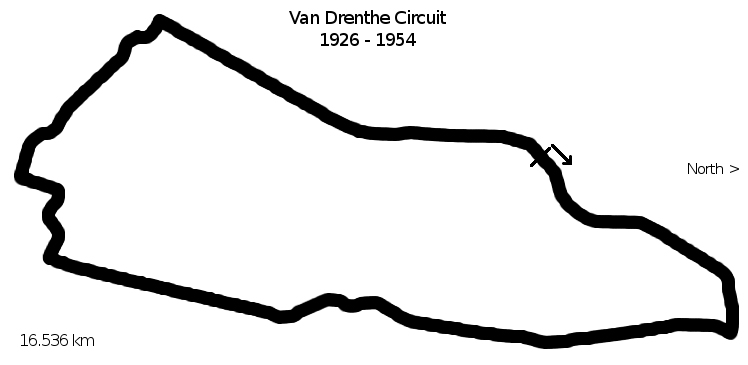
- Date: 9 July 1949
- Location: TT Circuit Assen
- Course: Permanent racing facility; 16.536 km (10.275 mi)

500cc
- Rider
Fastest lap
Rider	(Italy) Nello Pagani	Gilera
Podium
First	(Italy) Nello Pagani	Gilera
Second	(United Kingdom) Leslie Graham	AJS
Third	(Italy) Arciso Artesiani	Gilera

350cc
- Rider
Fastest lap
Rider	(United Kingdom) Freddie Frith	Velocette
Podium
First	(United Kingdom) Freddie Frith	Velocette
Second	(United Kingdom) Bob Foster	Velocette
Third	(United Kingdom) Johnny Lockett	Norton

125cc
- Rider
Fastest lap
Rider	(Italy) Nello Pagani	FB-Mondial
Time	8:45.8	
Podium
First	(Italy) Nello Pagani	FB-Mondial
Second	(Italy) Oscar Clemencich	MV Agusta
Third	(Italy) Carlo Ubbiali	FB-Mondial

The 1949 Dutch motorcycle Grand Prix was the third race of the 1949 Motorcycle Grand Prix season. It took place on the weekend of 9 July 1949 at the Assen circuit.

Italian rider Nello Pagani won the 500 cc race riding a Gilera from Leslie Graham and Arciso Artesiani. Pagani also won the 125 cc race on his smaller Gilera which saw him wrap up the first 125 cc World Championship having won the first two 125 cc races with only one race remaining.

Similarly, in winning the 350 cc race British Velocette rider Freddie Frith, having achieved a perfect score of 33 points from the first three races became the first 350 cc Motorcycle World Champion.

== 500 cc classification ==
Pos	Rider	Manufacturer	Time/Retired	Points
1	(Italy) Nello Pagani	Gilera	1:47:32.7	11
2	(United Kingdom) Leslie Graham	AJS	+13.1	8
3	(Italy) Arciso Artesiani	Gilera	+1:03.9	7
4	(United Kingdom) Artie Bell	Norton	+2:38.7	6
5	(United Kingdom) Johnny Lockett	Norton	+4:47.9	5
6	(United Kingdom) Harold Daniell	Norton	+6:48.2	
7	(Italy) Umberto Masetti	Gilera		
8	(Australia) Harry Hinton	Norton		
9	(Italy) Oscar Clemencich	Gilera		
10	(Italy) Enrico Lorenzetti	Moto Guzzi		
11	(Netherlands) Drikus Veer	Triumph		
12	(United Kingdom) Oliver Scott	Norton		
20 finishers

== 350 cc classification ==
Pos	Rider	Manufacturer	Time/Retired	Points
1	(United Kingdom) Freddie Frith	Velocette	1:47:52.0	10
2	(United Kingdom) Bob Foster	Velocette	+1.9	8
3	(United Kingdom) Johnny Lockett	Norton	+1:56.9	7
4	(United Kingdom) David Whitworth	Velocette	+2:05.1	6
5	(Australia) Eric McPherson	Velocette	+2:50.7	5
6	(United Kingdom) Ted Frend	AJS	+3:10.3	1
7	(United Kingdom) Artie Bell	Norton		
8	(Republic of Ireland) Reg Armstrong	AJS		
9	(United Kingdom) Frank Fry	Velocette		
10	(Australia) Harry Hinton	Norton		
11	(United Kingdom) Wilf Sleightholme	AJS		
12	(United Kingdom) Bill Petch	AJS		
25 finishers

== 125cc classification ==
Pos.	Rider	Manufacturer	Laps	Time/Retired	Points
1	(Italy) Nello Pagani	FB-Mondial	7	1:02:38.8	11 (Note: Includes one point for fastest lap.)
2	(Italy) Oscar Clemencich	FB-Mondial	7	+48.3	8
3	(Italy) Carlo Ubbiali	MV Agusta	7	+1:02.0	7
4	(Italy) Franco Bertoni	MV Agusta	7	+1:42.3	6
5	(Italy) Giuseppe Matucci	MV Agusta	7	+5:09.0	5
6	(Netherlands) Toon van Zutphen	Eysink			
7	(Netherlands) Jan Rietveld	DMF			
8	(Netherlands) Kees Huybregts	Eysink			
9	(Netherlands) N. C. Luybregts	CZ			
10	(Netherlands) Gijs Lagerweij	Sparta			
11	H. Verhagen	Eysink			
12	(Spain) José Maria Llobet	Montesa			
DSQ	(Italy) Umberto Masetti	Moto Morini		Disqualified (Note: Disqualified for receiving irregular pit assistance)	
25 starters, 17 finishers

Previous race: 1949 Swiss Grand Prix	FIM Grand Prix World Championship; 1949 season	Next race: 1949 Belgian Grand Prix
Previous race: None	Dutch TT	Next race: 1950 Dutch TT
