= 1950 Isle of Man TT =

Annual motorcycle racing event

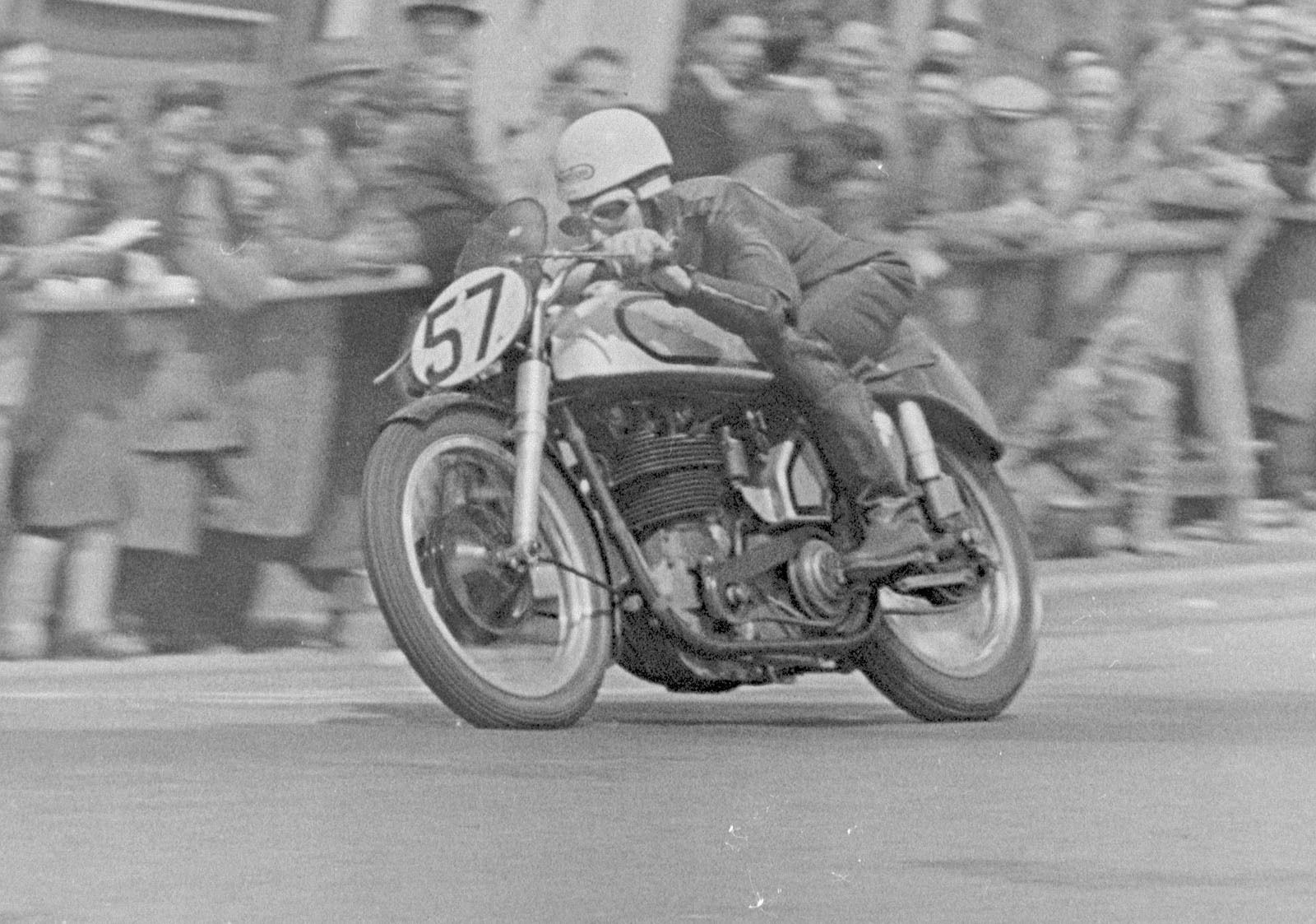
Senior TT winner Geoff Duke

The 1950 Isle of Man Tourist Trophy festival was the second year the Isle of Man TT races were part of the Grand Prix World Championship.

After his win in the 1949 Isle of Man Clubman event, Geoff Duke entered the 1950 Isle of Man TT only to find himself racing against formidable opposition in his first Senior TT, not only from his experienced Norton teammates, Artie Bell, Harold Daniell and Johnny Lockett, but also Les Graham on an AJS Porcupine, Reg Armstrong and Bob Foster on Velocettes. Geoff was wearing a new set of one-piece leathers and he beat them all, breaking both lap and race records in the Senior, and finishing second in the Junior TT. It was the beginning of a spectacular racing career for Geoff Duke.

The Norton team had the new Featherbed frame on their racing bikes that had excellent handing characteristics. It was another Norton ridden by Artie Bell that won the Junior, with Norton occupying the first three places of the Senior and Junior races. The Lightweight TT went to the Italian bikes, with first and second being Dario Ambrosini on a Benelli, and Maurice Cann on a Moto Guzzi, respectively.

As in 1949, four Clubman races were included in this year's festival; Clubman 1,000 cc, Clubman Senior, Clubman Junior and Clubman Lightweight.

Shell filmed the race for a short film.

== 1950 Isle of Man Senior TT 500cc final standings ==
1950 – 6 Laps (236.38 Miles) Mountain Course.

Place	Rider	Number	Machine	Speed	Time	Points
1	(United Kingdom) Geoff Duke		Norton	92.37 mph	2:51.45.60	8
2	(United Kingdom) Artie Bell		Norton	90.86 mph	2:54.25.6	6
3	(United Kingdom) Jonny Lockett		Norton	90.37 mph	2:55.22.40	4
4	(United Kingdom) Les Graham		AJS	90.11 mph	2:55.52.0	3
5	(United Kingdom) Harold Daniell		Norton	89.78 mph	2:56.31.0	2
6	(Republic of Ireland) Reg Armstrong		Norton	86.83 mph	3:02.31.40	1

== Sources ==
Previous race: 1949 Nations Grand Prix	FIM Grand Prix World Championship; 1950 season	Next race: 1950 Belgian Grand Prix
Previous race: 1949 Isle of Man TT	Isle of Man TT	Next race: 1951 Isle of Man TT
