= 1951 Isle of Man TT =

Annual motorcycle racing event

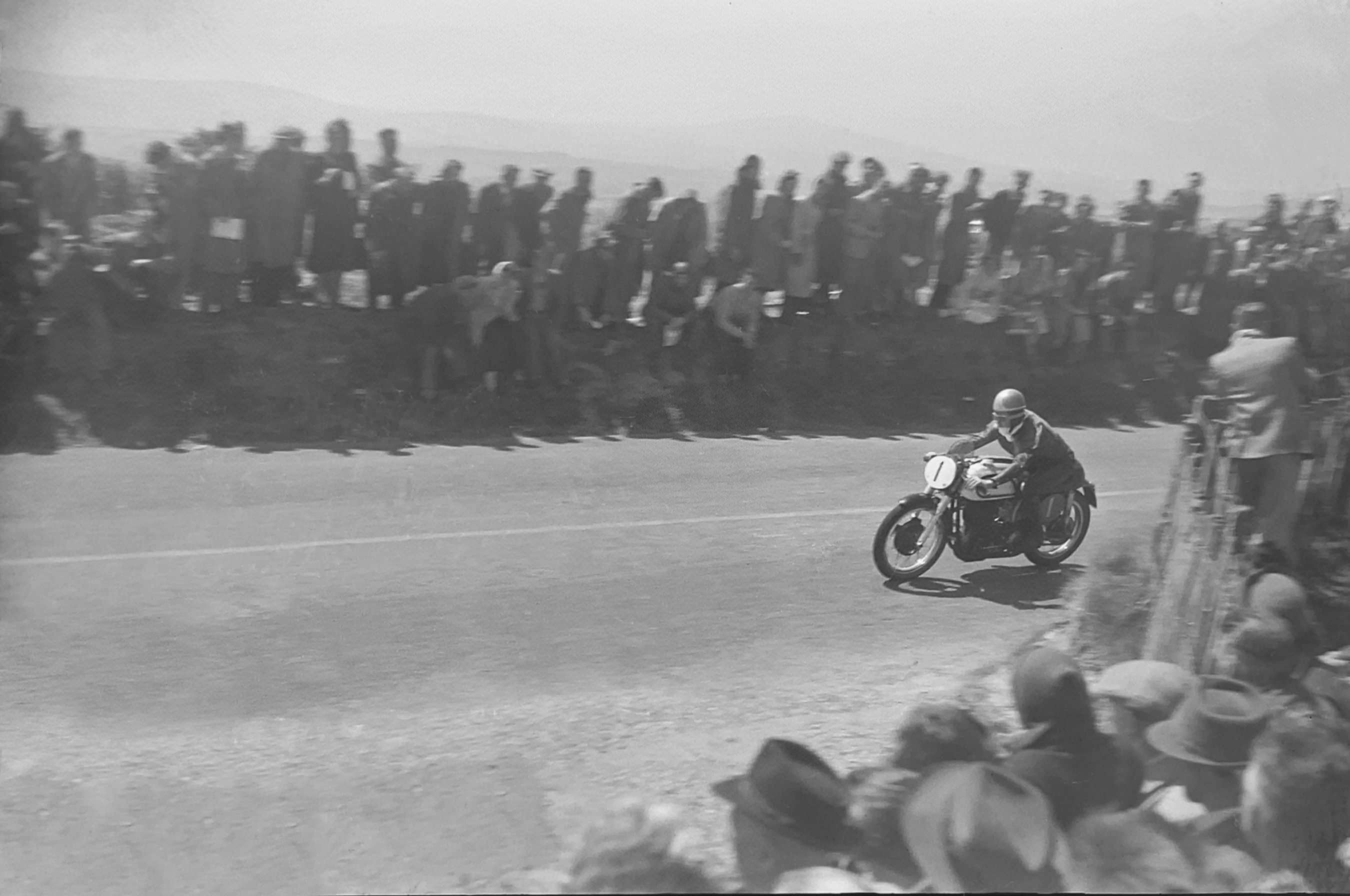
Senior TT and Junior TT winner Geoff Duke

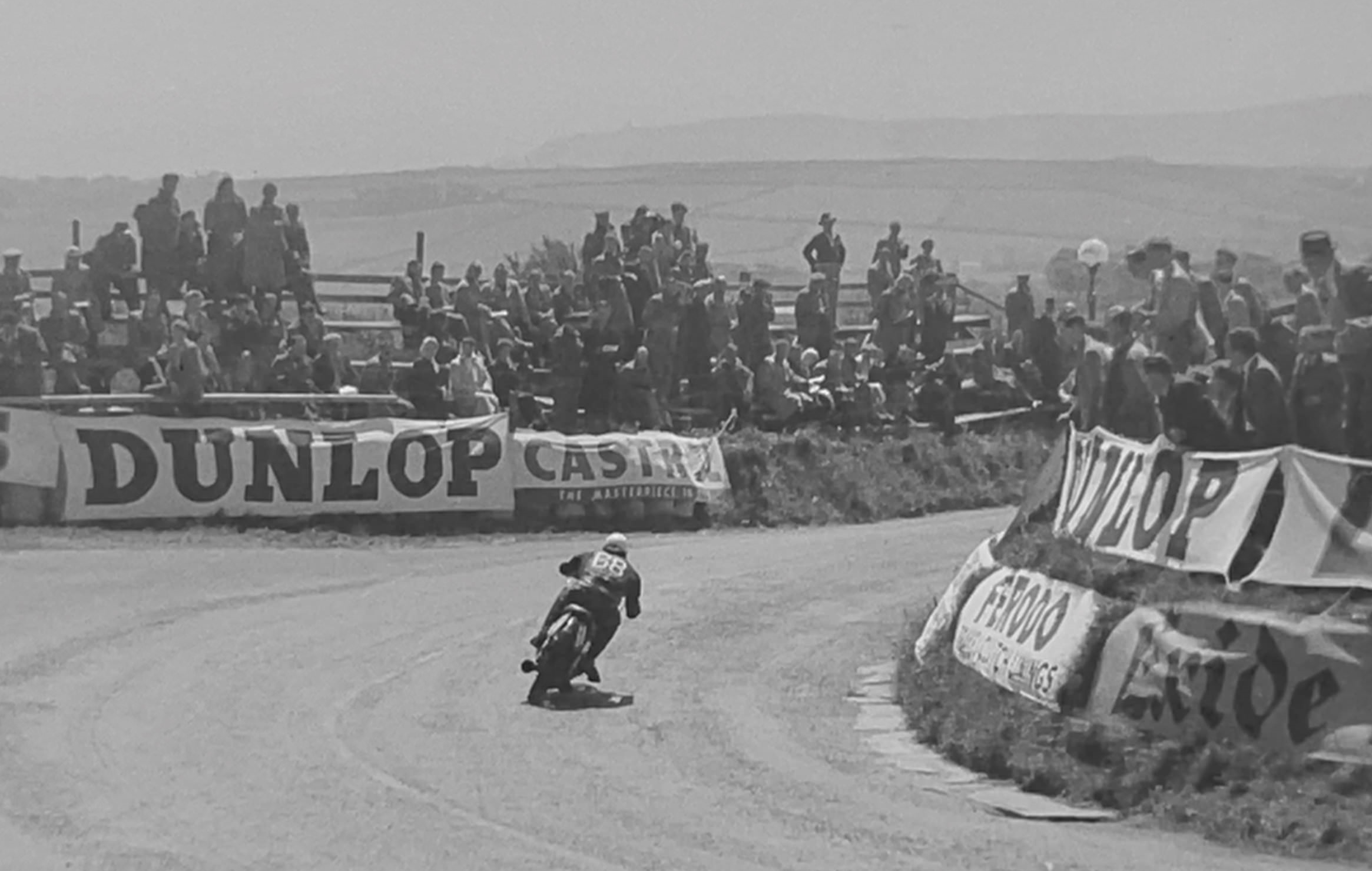
Second place finisher at the Senior TT, Bill Doran, at Creg-ny-Baa

The 1951 Isle of Man Tourist Trophy was the third round of the 1951 Grand Prix motorcycle racing season.

== Senior Results ==
Rank	Rider	Team	Speed	Time
1	(England) Geoff Duke	Norton	150.97 km/h	2.48.56.8
2	(United Kingdom) Bill Doran	AJS	147.12 km/h	2.53.19.2
3	(Northern Ireland) Cromie McCandless	Norton	145.34 km/h	2.55.27.0
4	(United Kingdom) Tommy McEwan	Norton	139.75 km/h	3.02.26.6
5	(Republic of Ireland) Manliff Barrington	Norton	138.55 km/h	3.04.03.4
6	(United Kingdom) Len Parry	Norton	138.21 km/h	3.04.30.2
7	(United Kingdom) Eric Briggs	Norton	137.78 km/h	3.05.04.6
8	(United Kingdom) Albert Moule	Norton	136.12 km/h	3.07.20.0
9	(United Kingdom) Len Perry	Norton	136.04 km/h	3.07.26.0
10	(United Kingdom) Les Dear	Norton	135.37 km/h	3.08.22.4

== Junior TT Results ==
Rank	Rider	Team	Speed	Time
1	(England) Geoff Duke	Norton	144.65 km/h	2.56.17.6
2	(United Kingdom) Johnny Lockett	Norton	141.99 km/h	2.59.35.0
3	(United Kingdom) Jack Brett	Norton	141.38 km/h	3.00.24.4
4	(United Kingdom) Mick Featherstone	AJS	138.89 km/h	3.03.35.8
5	(United Kingdom) Bill Lomas	Velocette	138.5 km/h	3.04.05.6
6	(England) Bob Foster	Velocette	137.94 km/h	3.04.51.6
7	(Northern Ireland) Cromie McCandless	Norton	137.46 km/h	3.05.31.0
8	(New Zealand) Rod Coleman	AJS	137.18 km/h	3.05.53.4
9	(Federation of Rhodesia and Nyasaland) Ray Amm	Norton	137.07 km/h	3.06.01.8
10	(United Kingdom) Les Graham	Velocette	136.85 km/h	3.06.21.0

== Lightweight Results ==
Rank	Rider	Team	Speed	Time
1	(United Kingdom) Tommy Wood	Moto Guzzi	130.96 km/h	1.51.15.8
2	(Italy) Dario Ambrosini	Benelli	130.8 km/h	1.51.24.2
3	(Italy) Enrico Lorenzetti	Moto Guzzi	126.71 km/h	1.55.00.0
4	(United Kingdom) Wilfred G. Hutt	Moto Guzzi	123.7 km/h	1.57.48.8
5	(United Kingdom) Arthur Wheeler	Velocette	120.85 km/h	2.00.39.0
6	(United Kingdom) Fron Purslow	Norton	118.99 km/h	2.02.28.4
7	(Denmark) Svend Aage Sørensen	Excelsior	114.06 km/h	2.07.44.8
8	(United Kingdom) Frank Cope	AJS	112.63 km/h	2.09.22.0
9	(United Kingdom) Arnold W. Jones	Excelsior	109.81 km/h	2.12.40.8
10	(United Kingdom) Harold Hartley	Rudge	109.28 km/h	2.13.20.0

== Ultra Lightweight Results ==
Rank	Rider	Team	Speed	Time
1	(Northern Ireland) Cromie McCandless	Mondial	120.43 km/h	1.00.30.0
2	(Italy) Carlo Ubbiali	Mondial	119.68 km/h	1.00.52.4
3	(Italy) Gianni Leoni	Mondial	115.08 km/h	1.03.19.8
4	(Italy) Nello Pagani	Mondial	112.76 km/h	1.04.36.6
5	(Spain) Juan S Bulto	Montesa	102.11 km/h	1.11.21.0
6	(Spain) Jose M Llobet	Montesa	98.44 km/h	1.14.01.4
7	(United Kingdom) Eric V C Hardy	DOT	93.1 km/h	1.18.16.2
8	(United Kingdom) Howard A Grindley	DMW	91.55 km/h	1.19.34.6
9	(United Kingdom) Leslie D Caldecutt	BSA	90.72 km/h	1.20.19.0
10	(United Kingdom) Robert Holton	Pankhurst Special	90.68 km/h	1.20.24.6

== Clubmans Senior Results ==
Rank	Rider	Team	Speed	Time
1	(United Kingdom) Ken Arber	Triumph	128.24 km/h	1.53.37.6
2	(United Kingdom) Ivan B Wickstead	Triumph	127.85 km/h	1.53.57.6
3	(United Kingdom) John Draper	Triumph	126.4 km/h	1.55.17.0
4	(United Kingdom) Bob W C Ritchie	Norton	126.1 km/h	1.55.33.2
5	(United Kingdom) Harry Plews	Norton	126.05 km/h	1.55.36.2
6	(United Kingdom) Jack Wood	Norton	124.75 km/h	1.56.53.0
7	(United Kingdom) Bob A Rowbottom	Matchless	123.7 km/h	1.57.48.6
8	(United Kingdom) Russell Oldfield	Triumph	123.14 km/h	1.58.20.0
9	(United Kingdom) David C Birrell	Triumph	122.24 km/h	1.59.12.0
10	(United Kingdom) John N P Wright	BSA	122.04 km/h	1.59.24.0

== Clubmans Junior Results ==
Rank	Rider	Team	Speed	Time
1	(United Kingdom) Brian Purslow	BSA	121.25 km/h	2.00.10.0
2	(United Kingdom) Geoff E Read	Norton	120.47 km/h	2.00.56.6
3	(United Kingdom) John Draper	Norton	120.24 km/h	2.01.10.8
4	(United Kingdom) D N Bradshaw	Norton	119.89 km/h	2.01.33.2
5	(United Kingdom) Derek Farrant	BSA	119.63 km/h	2.01.48.4
6	(United Kingdom) D Carr	Norton	118.44 km/h	2.02.42.0
7	(United Kingdom) Stan T Cooper	Douglas	116.57 km/h	2.04.56.8
8	(United Kingdom) John Moore	BSA	116.3 km/h	2.05.18.4
9	(United Kingdom) C E Staley	BSA	116.02 km/h	2.05.32.2
10	(United Kingdom) Derek Morley	BSA	115.75 km/h	2.05.53.0
