= Freddie Frith =

British motorcycle racer

Freddie Frith OBE
- Frith demonstrating a 1930s Manx Norton at the Vintage Motor Cycle Club's Founder's Day rally, race meeting and parade gathering, 27 April 1969 at Mallory Park
- Nationality: British
- Born: Frederick Lee Frith; 30 May 1909
- Died: 24 May 1988 (aged 79); Grimsby, Lincolnshire, England
Motorcycle racing career statistics
Grand Prix motorcycle racing
Active years	1949
First race	1949 350cc Isle of Man TT
Last race	1949 350cc Ulster Grand Prix
First win	1949 350cc Isle of Man TT
Last win	1949 350cc Ulster Grand Prix
Team	Velocette
Championships	350cc - 1949
Starts / Wins / Podiums / Poles / F. laps / Points; 6 / 5 / 5 / 0 / 4 / 38

Frederick Lee Frith OBE (30 May 1909 – 24 May 1988) was a British Grand Prix motorcycle road racing world champion. A former stonemason and later a motor cycle retailer in Grimsby, he was a stylish rider and five times winner of the Isle of Man TT. Frith was one of the few to win TT races before and after the Second World War. He was appointed an Officer of the Order of the British Empire (OBE) in the 1950 Birthday Honours.

== Motorcycle racing career ==
Frith entered his first major race, the first Manx Grand Prix in 1930 riding an over-the counter, 350 cc Velocette KTT in the Junior event, finishing third at a speed of 60.34 mph. He retired from the 500 cc race with a blown engine, again riding his 350, when holding third place.

Frith won the 1935 Junior Manx Grand Prix and then joined the Norton team for the 1936 TT Races. It was a winning combination, as he claimed the Junior TT and finished second in the Senior TT as well as winning the 350cc European Championship. In 1937, he went one better in the Senior and took a brilliant win and setting the first 90 mph plus lap of the Snaefell Mountain Course.

After finishing third in the 1939 Senior, Frith missed the 1947 TT due to a practice spill on a 500cc Moto Guzzi. Turning to Velocettes in 1948, he won the Junior Race, repeating this success a year later. Frith was the first ever 350cc World Champion in 1949, winning all five events of the inaugural campaign, using a single-overhead-camshaft engine in the Ulster race.

Frith, alongside other riders from BSA, Ariel and Matchless works teams, served in the army during World War 2 at the Infantry Driving & Maintenance School stationed at Keswick, where officers and NCOs learned how to ride cross-country. Sgt. Freddie Frith taught teams of four on Norton 500s over Skiddaw in all weathers. A special treat on the last day was reserved for roadwork, following Frith's track-style fast cornering.

== Motorcycle Grand Prix results ==
1949 point system

Position	1	2	3	4	5	Fastest lap
Points	10	8	7	6	5	1

(key) (Races in italics indicate fastest lap)

Year	Class	Team	1	2	3	4	5	6	Points	Rank	Wins
1949	350cc	Velocette	IOM; 1	SUI; 1	NED; 1	BEL; 1	ULS; 1		33	1st	5
1949	500cc	Velocette	IOM; NC	SUI; 5	NED -	BEL -	ULS -	NAT -	5	11th	0

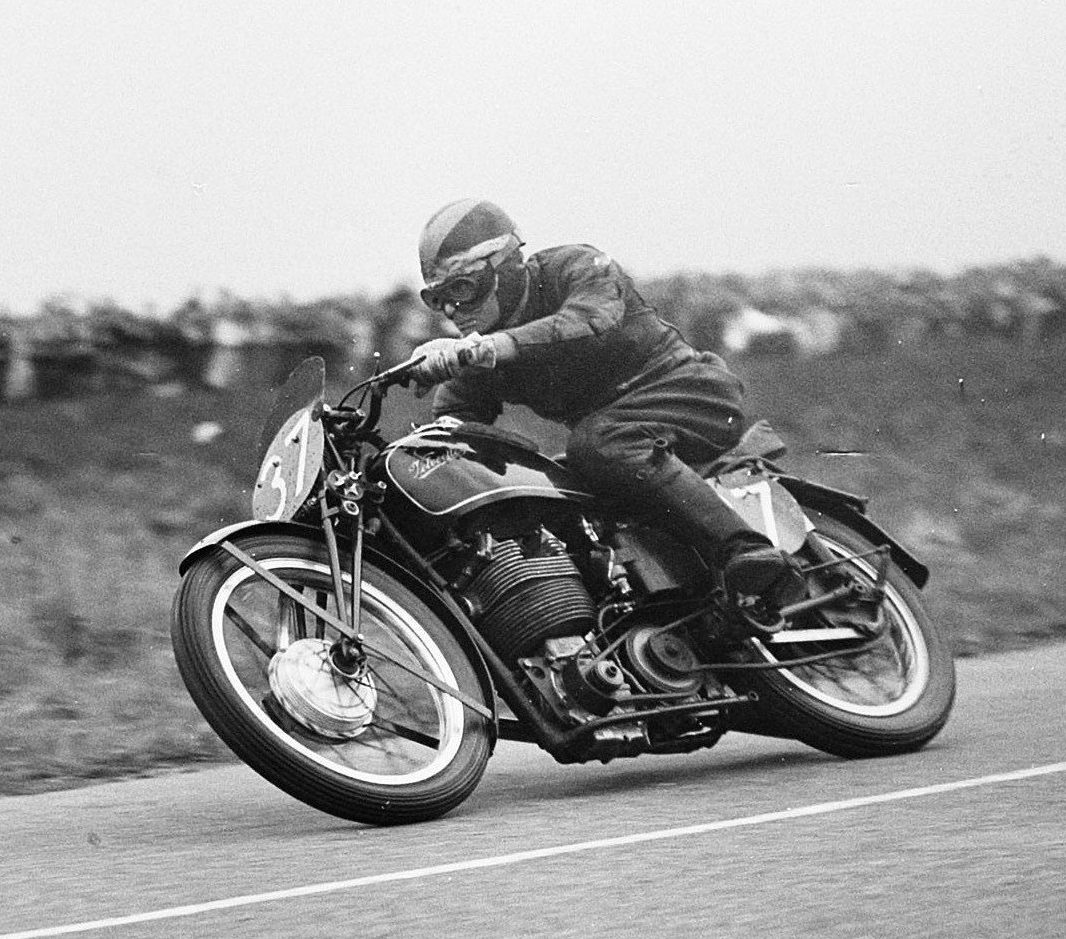
Frith on his 350cc bike at the 1948 Dutch TT
