= Syd Jensen =

- Nationality: New Zealand
- Born: 13 November 1922
- Died: 22 July 1999 (aged 76)
Motorcycle racing career statistics
Grand Prix motorcycle racing
Active years	1949–1950
First race	1949 500cc Isle of Man TT
Last race	1950 500cc Dutch TT
Team	Triumph
Starts / Wins / Podiums / Poles / F. laps / Points; 2 / 0 / 0 / N/A / N/A / 6

Sydney Harold Jensen (13 November 1922 – 22 July 1999) was a Grand Prix motorcycle and auto racer from New Zealand.

== Racing career ==
Jensen's best result in motorcycle racing was at the 1949 Isle of Man TT when he placed fifth in the Senior TT. He later moved to auto racing, finishing second to Bruce McLaren in the New Zealand Gold Star Championship in 1959. Jensen won the New Zealand Gold Star Championship in 1960.

== Career statistics ==
=== By season ===
Season	Class	Motorcycle	Race	Win	Podium	Pole	FLap	Pts	Pos.
1949	500cc	Triumph	1	0	0	0	0	5	10th
1950	500cc	Triumph	1	0	0	0	0	1	16th
Total			2	0	0	0	0	6	
