= Carlo Bandirola =

Italian motorcycle racer (1915–1981)

- Nationality: Italian
Motorcycle racing career statistics
Grand Prix motorcycle racing
Active years	1950 - 1956, 1958
First race	1950 500cc Belgian Grand Prix
Last race	1958 500cc Nations Grand Prix
Team(s)	Gilera, MV Agusta
Starts / Wins / Podiums / Poles / F. laps / Points; 15 / 0 / 7 / N/A / 2 / 52

Carlo Bandirola (25 September 1915 – 21 September 1981) was an Italian Grand Prix motorcycle road racer. He had his best years in 1950 then again in 1955 when he finished fifth in the 500cc world championship.
