= 1949 Nations motorcycle Grand Prix =

(Italy) 1949 Nations Grand Prix
Race details
- Race 6 of 6 races in the 1949 Grand Prix motorcycle racing season
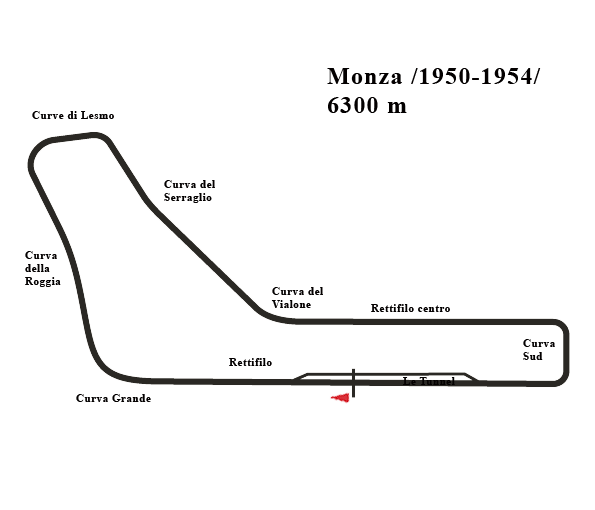
- Date: 4 September 1949
- Location: Autodromo Nazionale Monza
- Course: Permanent racing facility; 6.30 km (3.91 mi)

500cc
- Rider
Fastest lap
Rider	(Italy) Nello Pagani	Gilera
Podium
First	(Italy) Nello Pagani	Gilera
Second	(Italy) Arciso Artesiani	Gilera
Third	(United Kingdom) Bill Doran	AJS

250cc
- Rider
Fastest lap
Rider	(Italy) Dario Ambrosini	Benelli
Podium
First	(Italy) Dario Ambrosini	Benelli
Second	(Italy) Gianni Leoni	Moto Guzzi
Third	(Italy) Umberto Masetti	Benelli

125cc
- Rider
Fastest lap
Rider	(Italy) Gianni Leoni	FB-Mondial
Time	2:57.6	
Podium
First	(Italy) Gianni Leoni	FB-Mondial
Second	(Italy) Umberto Masetti	Moto Morini
Third	(Italy) Umberto Braga	FB-Mondial

Sidecar (B2A)
- Rider
Fastest lap
Rider	(United Kingdom) Eric Oliver	Norton
Time	86.7 mph (139.5 km/h)	
Podium
First	(Italy) Ercole Frigerio	Gilera
Second	(Belgium) Frans Vanderschrick	Norton
Third	(Italy) Albino Milani	Gilera

The 1949 Nations Grand Prix was the fifth round of the 1949 Grand Prix motorcycle racing season. It took place at the Autodromo Nazionale Monza.

Italian rider Nello Pagani won the 500 cc race riding a Gilera from Arciso Artesiani and Bill Doran.

Despite Dario Ambrosini winning the 250 cc race, a fourth-place finish for Italian Moto Guzzi rider Bruno Ruffo was enough for him to win the 250 cc championship, the only championship in the first season with results close enough to be still in doubt at the final race.

== 500 cc classification ==
Pos	Rider	Manufacturer	Time	Points
1	(Italy) Nello Pagani	Gilera	1:16:36.8	11
2	(Italy) Arciso Artesiani	Gilera	+0.8	8
3	(United Kingdom) Bill Doran	AJS	+15.8	7
4	(Italy) Guido Leoni	Moto Guzzi	+18.2	6
5	(Italy) Bruno Bertacchini	Moto Guzzi	+31.2	6
6	(Republic of Ireland) Reg Armstrong	AJS	+1:03.6	
15 finishers

== 250 cc classification ==
Pos	Rider	Manufacturer	Time	Points
1	(Italy) Dario Ambrosini	Benelli	1:02:53.8	11
2	(Italy) Gianni Leoni	Moto Guzzi	+32.6	8
3	(Italy) Umberto Masetti	Benelli	+52.2	7
4	(Italy) Bruno Ruffo	Moto Guzzi		6
5	(Italy) Claudio Mastellari	Moto Guzzi		5
6	(Italy) Bruno Francisci	Moto Guzzi		

== 125cc classification ==
Pos.	Rider	Manufacturer	Laps	Time/Retired	Points
1	(Italy) Gianni Leoni	FB-Mondial	18	54:16.0	11 (Note: Includes one point for fastest lap.)
2	(Italy) Umberto Masetti	Moto Morini	18	+`1:03.0	8
3	(Italy) Umberto Braga	FB-Mondial	18	+1:18.0	7
4	(Italy) Renato Magi	Moto Morini	18	+1:40.4	6
5	(Italy) Nello Pagani	FB-Mondial	18	+2:30.8	5
16 starters, 13 finishers

Previous race: 1949 Ulster Grand Prix	FIM Grand Prix World Championship; 1949 season	Next race: 1950 Isle of Man TT
Previous race: 1948 Nations Grand Prix	Nations Grand Prix	Next race: 1950 Nations Grand Prix
