= List of 500cc/MotoGP rider records =

This is a list of rider records in the 500cc/MotoGP class of the Grand Prix motorcycle racing, since 1949. Riders that have competed in the 2026 MotoGP World Championship are highlighted in bold.

This page is accurate as of the 2026 Qatar Grand Prix.

== Races entered and started ==
Riders are considered to be entered into a race if they attempt to compete in at least one official practice session with the intent of entering the race. These riders are noted on the entry list for that race. A rider is considered to have started a race if they line up on the grid or at the pitlane exit for the start of the race. If a race is stopped and restarted, participation in any portion of the race is counted, but only if that portion was in any way counted towards the final classification.

=== Total entries ===
	Rider	Seasons	Entries
1	(Italy) Valentino Rossi	2000–2021	375
2	(Spain) **Aleix Espargaró**	2009–2010, 2012–2026	265
3	(Italy) Andrea Dovizioso	2008–2022	250
4	(Brazil) Alex Barros	1990–2005, 2007	248
5	(Spain) **Marc Márquez**	2013–2026	231
6	(Spain) Dani Pedrosa	2006–2018, 2021, 2023–2024	228
7	(Italy) Loris Capirossi	1995–1996, 2000–2011	222
7	(United States) Nicky Hayden	2003–2016	222
7	(Australia) **Jack Miller**	2015–2026	222
10	(Spain) **Maverick Viñales**	2015–2026	212

=== Total starts ===
	Rider	Seasons	Starts
1	(Italy) Valentino Rossi	2000–2021	372
2	(Spain) **Aleix Espargaró**	2009–2010, 2012–2025	260
3	(Italy) Andrea Dovizioso	2008–2022	248
4	(Brazil) Alex Barros	1990–2005, 2007	245
5	(Spain) **Marc Márquez**	2013–2026	224
6	(Spain) Dani Pedrosa	2006–2018, 2021, 2023–2024	221
7	(United States) Nicky Hayden	2003–2016	218
8	(Italy) Loris Capirossi	1995–1996, 2000–2011	217
9	(Australia) **Jack Miller**	2015–2026	216
10	(Spain) **Maverick Viñales**	2015–2026	206

=== Most consecutive race entries ===
	Rider	Consecutive entries	Races
1	(Italy) Andrea Dovizioso	231	2008 Qatar–2020 Portuguese
2	(Brazil) Alex Barros	200	1992 Brazilian–2005 Valencian
3	(Australia) **Jack Miller**	174	2017 Australian–2026 Malaysian
4	(Italy) Valentino Rossi	171	2000 South African–2010 Italian
5	(United States) Colin Edwards	154	2003 Japanese–2011 Malaysian
6	(France) **Fabio Quartararo**	152	2019 Qatar–2026 Malaysian
7	(Spain) Sete Gibernau	149	1997 Malaysian–2006 Catalan
8	(Spain) Álvaro Bautista	143	2011 Portuguese–2018 Valencian
9	(Japan) Shinya Nakano	134	2001 Japanese–2008 Valencian
9	(South Africa) **Brad Binder**	134	2020 Spanish–2026 Qatar (ongoing)

=== Most consecutive race starts ===
	Rider	Consecutive starts	Races
1	(Italy) Andrea Dovizioso	229	2008 Qatar–2020 Portuguese
2	(Italy) Valentino Rossi	170	2000 South African–2010 French
3	(Brazil) Alex Barros	158	1992 Brazilian–2003 Dutch
4	(France) **Fabio Quartararo**	151	2019 Qatar–2026 Malaysian
5	(United States) Colin Edwards	141	2003 Japanese–2011 French
5	(Spain) Álvaro Bautista	141	2011 Portuguese–2018 Valencian
7	(Italy) Valentino Rossi	130	2010 German–2017 British
7	(Australia) **Jack Miller**	130	2017 Australian–2024 Thailand
9	(Spain) **Marc Márquez**	128	2013 Qatar–2020 Spanish
10	(Italy) Max Biaggi	127	1998 Japanese–2005 Valencian

=== Most races with a single motorcycle manufacturer ===
	Rider	Motorcycle	Seasons	Entries	Starts
1	(Italy) Valentino Rossi	Yamaha	2004–2010, 2013–2021	275	273
2	(Spain) Dani Pedrosa	Honda	2006–2018	224	217
3	(Spain) **Marc Márquez**	Honda	2013–2023	174	169
4	(Spain) Jorge Lorenzo	Yamaha	2008–2016	159	156
5	(Brazil) Alex Barros	Honda	1995–2002, 2004–2005	154	154
6	(Spain) **Aleix Espargaró**	Aprilia	2017–2024	147	143
7	(Japan) Norifumi Abe	Yamaha	1994–2004	146	144
8	(Italy) Andrea Dovizioso	Ducati	2013–2020	142	141
9	(Spain) Àlex Crivillé	Honda	1992–2001	141	139
10	(Australia) Mick Doohan	Honda	1989–1999	139	137

== Wins ==
=== Total wins ===
	Rider	Wins	Starts
1	(Italy) Valentino Rossi	89	372
2	(Spain) **Marc Márquez**	80	224
3	(Italy) Giacomo Agostini	68	130
4	(Australia) Mick Doohan	54	137
5	(Spain) Jorge Lorenzo	47	203
6	(Australia) Casey Stoner	38	115
7	(United Kingdom) Mike Hailwood	37	59
8	(United States) Eddie Lawson	31	127
8	(Spain) Dani Pedrosa	31	221
8	(Italy) **Francesco Bagnaia**	31	146

=== Percentage wins ===
	Rider	Seasons	Starts	Wins	Percentage
1	(Germany) Edmund Czihak	1974	1	1	100.00%
1	(United Kingdom) Phil Carpenter	1974	1	1	100.00%
3	(United Kingdom) John Surtees	1952, 1954–1960	26	22	84.62%
4	(Finland) Jarno Saarinen	1973	3	2	66.67%
5	(United Kingdom) Mike Hailwood	1958–1967	59	37	62.71%
6	(Wales) (Federation of Rhodesia and Nyasaland) Gary Hocking	1958–1959, 1961–1962	13	8	61.54%
7	(United Kingdom) Geoff Duke	1950–1959	37	22	59.46%
8	(Italy) Giacomo Agostini	1965–1977	130	68	52.31%
9	(United Kingdom) Fergus Anderson	1951, 1953–1954	4	2	50.00%
9	(Argentina) Jorge Kissling	1961, 1963	2	1	50.00%
9	(United Kingdom) Dick Creith	1964–1965	2	1	50.00%

=== Percentage wins (minimum 15 starts) ===
	Rider	Seasons	Starts	Wins	Percentage
1	(United Kingdom) John Surtees	1952, 1954–1960	26	22	84.62%
2	(United Kingdom) Mike Hailwood	1958–1967	59	37	62.71%
3	(United Kingdom) Geoff Duke	1950–1959	37	22	59.46%
4	(Italy) Giacomo Agostini	1965–1977	130	68	52.31%
5	(Australia) Mick Doohan	1989–1999	137	54	39.42%
6	(United States) Kenny Roberts	1978–1983	56	22	39.29%
7	(Spain) **Marc Márquez**	2013–2026	224	80	35.71%
8	(Australia) Casey Stoner	2006–2012	115	38	33.04%
9	(United States) Freddie Spencer	1980–1987, 1989, 1993	62	20	32.26%
10	(United States) Wayne Rainey	1988–1993	82	24	29.27%

=== Most wins in a season ===
	Rider	Season	Wins	No. of Races in a season
1	(Spain) **Marc Márquez**	2014	13	18
2	(Australia) Mick Doohan	1997	12	15
2	(Spain) **Marc Márquez**	2019	12	19
4	(Italy) Giacomo Agostini	1972	11	13 (Note: Agostini missed one race of the season.)
4	(Italy) Valentino Rossi	2001	11	16
4	(Italy) Valentino Rossi	2002	11	16
4	(Italy) Valentino Rossi	2005	11	17
4	(Italy) **Francesco Bagnaia**	2024	11	20
4	(Spain) **Marc Márquez**	2025	11	22 (Note: Márquez missed four races of the season.)
10	(Italy) Giacomo Agostini	1968	10	10
10	(Italy) Giacomo Agostini	1969	10	12 (Note: Agostini missed two races of the season.)
10	(Italy) Giacomo Agostini	1970	10	11 (Note: Agostini missed one race of the season.)
10	(Australia) Casey Stoner	2007	10	18
10	(Australia) Casey Stoner	2011	10	17

=== Highest percentage of wins in a season ===
	Rider	Season	Percentage	Races	Wins
1	(United Kingdom) John Surtees	1959	100.00%	7	7
1	(Italy) Giacomo Agostini	1968	100.00%	10	10
3	(Italy) Giacomo Agostini	1970	90.91%	11	10
4	(United Kingdom) Mike Hailwood	1963	87.50%	8	7
5	(United Kingdom) John Surtees	1958	85.71%	7	6
6	(Italy) Giacomo Agostini	1972	84.61%	13	11
7	(Italy) Giacomo Agostini	1969	83.33%	12	10
8	(United Kingdom) Mike Hailwood	1965	80.00%	10	8
8	(Australia) Mick Doohan	1997	80.00%	15	12
10	(United Kingdom) Mike Hailwood	1964	77.78%	9	7

=== Most consecutive wins ===
	Rider	Season(s)	Wins	Consecutive races won
1	(Italy) Giacomo Agostini	1968–1969	20	1968 German, Spanish, Isle of Man TT, Dutch TT, Belgian, East German, Czechoslovak, Finnish, Ulster, Nations; 1969 Spanish, German, French, Isle of Man TT, Dutch TT, Belgian, East German, Czechoslovak, Finnish, Ulster
2	(United Kingdom) Mike Hailwood	1963–1964	12	1963 Belgian, Ulster, East German, Finnish, Nations, Argentine; 1964 United States, Isle of Man TT, Dutch TT, Belgian, German, East German
3	(United Kingdom) John Surtees	1958–1960	11	1958 Ulster, Nations; 1959 French, Isle of Man TT, German, Dutch TT, Belgian, Ulster, Nations; 1960 French, Isle of Man TT
4	(Italy) Giacomo Agostini	1970	10	German, French, Yugoslavian, Isle of Man TT, Dutch TT, Belgian, East German, Finnish, Ulster, Nations
4	(Australia) Mick Doohan	1997	10	Italian, Austrian, French, Dutch TT, City of Imola, German, Rio de Janeiro, British, Czech Republic, Catalan
4	(Spain) **Marc Márquez**	2014	10	Qatar, Americas, Argentine, Spanish, French, Italian, Catalan, Dutch TT, German, Indianapolis
7	(United Kingdom) Mike Hailwood	1964–1965	8	1964 Nations; 1965 United States, German, Isle of Man TT, Dutch TT, Belgian, East German, Czechoslovak
7	(Italy) Giacomo Agostini	1971	8	Austrian, German, Isle of Man TT, Dutch TT, Belgian, East German, Swedish, Finnish
9	(Italy) Valentino Rossi	2002	7	Spanish, French, Italian, Catalan, Dutch TT, British, German
9	(Spain) **Marc Márquez**	2025	7	Aragon, Italian, Dutch TT, German, Czech Republic, Austrian, Hungarian

=== Most wins in the same Grand Prix ===
	Rider	Wins	Grand Prix	Seasons
1	(Italy) Giacomo Agostini	10	Finnish Grand Prix	1965, 1966, 1967, 1968, 1969, 1970, 1971, 1972, 1973, 1975
1	(Spain) **Marc Márquez**	10	German Grand Prix	2013, 2014, 2015, 2016, 2017, 2018, 2019, 2021, 2025, 2026
3	(Italy) Giacomo Agostini	8	Belgian Grand Prix	1966, 1967, 1968, 1969, 1970, 1971, 1972, 1973
3	(Italy) Giacomo Agostini	8	German Grand Prix	1967, 1968, 1969, 1970, 1971, 1972, 1975, 1976
3	(Italy) Valentino Rossi	8	Dutch TT	2002, 2004, 2005, 2007, 2009, 2013, 2015, 2017
3	(Spain) **Marc Márquez**	8	Aragon Grand Prix	2013, 2016, 2017, 2018, 2019, 2024, 2025, 2026
7	(Italy) Valentino Rossi	7	Italian Grand Prix	2002, 2003, 2004, 2005, 2006, 2007, 2008
7	(Italy) Valentino Rossi	7	Spanish Grand Prix	2001, 2002, 2003, 2005, 2007, 2009, 2016
7	(Italy) Valentino Rossi	7	Catalan Grand Prix	2001, 2002, 2004, 2005, 2006, 2009, 2016
7	(Spain) **Marc Márquez**	7	Grand Prix of the Americas	2013, 2014, 2015, 2016, 2017, 2018, 2021

=== Most consecutive wins in the same Grand Prix ===
	Rider	Wins	Grand Prix	Seasons
1	(Italy) Giacomo Agostini	9	Finnish Grand Prix	1965, 1966, 1967, 1968, 1969, 1970, 1971, 1972, 1973
2	(Italy) Giacomo Agostini	8	Belgian Grand Prix	1966, 1967, 1968, 1969, 1970, 1971, 1972, 1973
2	(Spain) **Marc Márquez**	8	German Grand Prix	2013, 2014, 2015, 2016, 2017, 2018, 2019, 2021
4	(Italy) Valentino Rossi	7	Italian Grand Prix	2002, 2003, 2004, 2005, 2006, 2007, 2008
5	(Italy) Giacomo Agostini	6	East German Grand Prix	1967, 1968, 1969, 1970, 1971, 1972
5	(United Kingdom) Barry Sheene	6	Swedish Grand Prix	1975, 1976, 1977, 1978, 1979, 1981
5	(Australia) Casey Stoner	6	Australian Grand Prix	2007, 2008, 2009, 2010, 2011, 2012
5	(Spain) **Marc Márquez**	6	Grand Prix of the Americas	2013, 2014, 2015, 2016, 2017, 2018
9	(United Kingdom) Mike Hailwood	5	Isle of Man TT	1963, 1964, 1965, 1966, 1967
9	(Italy) Giacomo Agostini	5	Dutch TT	1968, 1969, 1970, 1971, 1972
9	(Australia) Mick Doohan	5	Italian Grand Prix	1994, 1995, 1996, 1997, 1998
9	(Australia) Mick Doohan	5	Dutch TT	1994, 1995, 1996, 1997, 1998
9	(Italy) Valentino Rossi	5	Australian Grand Prix	2001, 2002, 2003, 2004, 2005

=== Most wins in the same circuit ===
	Rider	Wins	Circuit	Seasons
1	(Italy) Giacomo Agostini	10	Imatra	1965, 1966, 1967, 1968, 1969, 1970, 1971, 1972, 1973, 1975
1	(Spain) **Marc Márquez**	10	Sachsenring	2013, 2014, 2015, 2016, 2017, 2018, 2019, 2021, 2025, 2026
3	(Italy) Giacomo Agostini	8	Spa-Francorchamps	1966, 1967, 1968, 1969, 1970, 1971, 1972, 1973
3	(Italy) Valentino Rossi	8	Assen	2002, 2004, 2005, 2007, 2009, 2013, 2015, 2017
3	(Spain) **Marc Márquez**	8	Aragón	2013, 2016, 2017, 2018, 2019, 2024, 2025, 2026
6	(Italy) Valentino Rossi	7	Mugello	2002, 2003, 2004, 2005, 2006, 2007, 2008
6	(Italy) Valentino Rossi	7	Jerez	2001, 2002, 2003, 2005, 2007, 2009, 2016
6	(Italy) Valentino Rossi	7	Catalunya	2001, 2002, 2004, 2005, 2006, 2009, 2016
6	(Spain) **Marc Márquez**	7	Circuit of the Americas	2013, 2014, 2015, 2016, 2017, 2018, 2021
6	(Spain) **Marc Márquez**	7	Misano (Note: All of Márquez's wins are at the San Marino Grand Prix, except in 2021 where he won the Emilia Romagna Grand Prix. There were also a 2021 San Marino Grand Prix and a 2024 Emilia Romagna Grand Prix that were held at the same circuit, but Márquez did not win those two Grands Prix.)	2015, 2017, 2019, 2021, 2024, 2025, 2026

=== Most consecutive wins in the same circuit ===
	Rider	Wins	Circuit	Seasons
1	(Italy) Giacomo Agostini	9	Imatra	1965, 1966, 1967, 1968, 1969, 1970, 1971, 1972, 1973
2	(Italy) Giacomo Agostini	8	Spa-Francorchamps	1966, 1967, 1968, 1969, 1970, 1971, 1972, 1973
2	(Spain) **Marc Márquez**	8	Sachsenring	2013, 2014, 2015, 2016, 2017, 2018, 2019, 2021
4	(Italy) Valentino Rossi	7	Mugello	2002, 2003, 2004, 2005, 2006, 2007, 2008
5	(Italy) Giacomo Agostini	6	Sachsenring	1967, 1968, 1969, 1970, 1971, 1972
5	(Australia) Mick Doohan	6	Mugello	1993, 1994, 1995, 1996, 1997, 1998
5	(Australia) Casey Stoner	6	Phillip Island	2007, 2008, 2009, 2010, 2011, 2012
5	(Spain) **Marc Márquez**	6	Circuit of the Americas	2013, 2014, 2015, 2016, 2017, 2018
9	(United Kingdom) Mike Hailwood	5	Snaefell Mountain	1963, 1964, 1965, 1966, 1967
9	(Italy) Giacomo Agostini	5	Assen	1968, 1969, 1970, 1971, 1972
9	(Australia) Mick Doohan	5	Assen	1994, 1995, 1996, 1997, 1998
9	(Italy) Valentino Rossi	5	Phillip Island	2001, 2002, 2003, 2004, 2005

=== Most consecutive seasons with a Grand Prix win ===
	Rider	Seasons	Total
1	(Italy) Giacomo Agostini	1965–1976	12
1	(Spain) Dani Pedrosa	2006–2017	12
3	(Italy) Valentino Rossi	2000–2010	11
4	(Australia) Mick Doohan	1990–1998	9
4	(Spain) Jorge Lorenzo	2008–2016	9
6	(United Kingdom) Mike Hailwood	1961–1967	7
6	(United States) Kevin Schwantz	1988–1994	7
6	(Italy) Max Biaggi	1998–2004	7
6	(Spain) **Marc Márquez**	2013–2019	7
10	(United States) Kenny Roberts	1978–1983	6
10	(United States) Eddie Lawson	1984–1989	6
10	(United States) Wayne Rainey	1988–1993	6
10	(Spain) Àlex Crivillé	1995–2000	6
10	(Australia) Casey Stoner	2007–2012	6
10	(Spain) **Maverick Viñales**	2016–2021	6

=== Most Grand Prix wins by riders that have not won a World Championship ===
	Rider	Seasons	Starts	Wins
1	(Spain) Dani Pedrosa	2006–2018, 2021, 2023–2024	221	31
2	(Italy) Andrea Dovizioso	2008–2022	248	15
3	(United States) Randy Mamola	1979–1990, 1992	142	13
3	(Italy) Max Biaggi	1998–2005	127	13
5	(Italy) **Marco Bezzecchi**	2022–2026	99	12
6	(Spain) **Maverick Viñales**	2015–2026	206	10
7	(Spain) Sete Gibernau	1997–2006, 2009	159	9
7	(Italy) Loris Capirossi	1995–1996, 2000–2011	217	9
9	(Italy) Luca Cadalora	1989, 1993–2000	83	8
10	(Brazil) Alex Barros	1990–2005, 2007	245	7
10	(Italy) **Enea Bastianini**	2021–2026	109	7

=== Most wins in first championship season ===
	Rider	Season	Wins	Races won
1	(Spain) **Marc Márquez**	2013	6	Americas, German, United States, Indianapolis, Czech, Aragon
2	(United States) Kenny Roberts	1978	4	Austrian, French, Nations, British
3	(United Kingdom) Geoff Duke	1950	3	Isle of Man, Ulster, Nations
4	(United Kingdom) Leslie Graham	1949	2	Swiss, Ulster
4	(Italy) Nello Pagani	1949	2	Dutch, Nations
4	(Italy) Umberto Masetti	1950	2	Belgian, Dutch
4	(Finland) Jarno Saarinen	1973	2	French, Austrian
4	(Italy) Max Biaggi	1998	2	Japanese, Czech
4	(Italy) Valentino Rossi	2000	2	British, Brazilian
4	(Spain) Dani Pedrosa	2006	2	Chinese, British

=== Youngest winners ===
(only the first win for each rider is listed)

	Rider	Age	Race
1	(Spain) **Marc Márquez**	20 years, 63 days	2013 Grand Prix of the Americas
2	(Spain) **Fermín Aldeguer**	20 years, 183 days	2025 Indonesian Grand Prix
3	(United States) Freddie Spencer	20 years, 196 days	1982 Belgian Grand Prix
4	(Japan) Norifumi Abe	20 years, 227 days	1996 Japanese Grand Prix
4	(Spain) Dani Pedrosa	20 years, 227 days	2006 Chinese Grand Prix
6	(United States) Randy Mamola	20 years, 239 days	1980 Belgian Grand Prix
7	(Spain) Jorge Lorenzo	20 years, 345 days	2008 Portuguese Grand Prix
8	(United Kingdom) Mike Hailwood	21 years, 75 days	1961 Isle of Man TT
9	(France) **Fabio Quartararo**	21 years, 90 days	2020 Spanish Grand Prix
10	(Italy) Valentino Rossi	21 years, 144 days	2000 British Grand Prix

=== Oldest winners ===
(only the last win for each rider is listed)

	Rider	Age	Race
1	(United Kingdom) Fergus Anderson	44 years, 237 days	1953 Spanish Grand Prix
2	(Australia) Jack Findlay	42 years, 85 days	1977 Austrian Grand Prix
3	(United Kingdom) Leslie Graham	41 years, 21 days	1952 Spanish Grand Prix
4	(Australia) Jack Ahearn	39 years, 327 days	1964 Finnish Grand Prix
5	(United Kingdom) Harold Daniell	39 years, 231 days	1949 Isle of Man TT
6	(Czechoslovakia) František Šťastný	38 years, 247 days	1966 East German Grand Prix
7	(Italy) Valentino Rossi	38 years, 129 days	2017 Dutch TT
8	(Italy) Nello Pagani	37 years, 328 days	1949 Nations Grand Prix
9	(Australia) Troy Bayliss	37 years, 213 days	2006 Valencian Grand Prix
10	(United Kingdom) Phil Read	36 years, 235 days	1975 Czechoslovak Grand Prix

=== Most races before first win ===
	Start	Rider	Race
1	200th race	(Spain) **Aleix Espargaró**	2022 Argentine Grand Prix
2	124th race	(Italy) Danilo Petrucci	2019 Italian Grand Prix
3	120th race	(France) **Johann Zarco**	2023 Australian Grand Prix
4	98th race	(United Kingdom) **Cal Crutchlow**	2016 Czech Republic Grand Prix
5	94th race	(Spain) **Álex Márquez**	2025 Spanish Grand Prix
6	82nd race	(Australia) Jack Findlay	1971 Ulster Grand Prix
7	76th race	(Spain) **Raúl Fernández**	2025 Australian Grand Prix
8	72nd race	(Spain) Sete Gibernau	2001 Valencian Grand Prix
9	61st race	(Italy) Andrea Iannone	2016 Austrian Grand Prix
10	56th race	(Spain) **Pedro Acosta**	2026 Austrian Grand Prix

=== Most races without a win ===
	Rider	Starts	Best result
1	(United States) Colin Edwards	196	2nd
2	(Spain) **Pol Espargaró**	178	2nd
3	(Spain) Álvaro Bautista	159	3rd
4	(France) Randy de Puniet	140	2nd
5	(Spain) Héctor Barberá	139	4th
6	(Japan) Shinya Nakano	133	2nd
7	(Germany) Stefan Bradl	131	2nd
8	(Czech Republic) Karel Abraham	122	7th
9	(United Kingdom) Bradley Smith	119	2nd
10	(United Kingdom) Jeremy McWilliams	118	3rd

=== Closest ever win finishes ===
	Riders	Duration	Details
1	(United Kingdom) Barry Sheene (1st) (Italy) Giacomo Agostini (2nd)	0.0 (Note: The 500cc motorcycle grand prix race at the 1975 Dutch TT at Assen is the only premier class bike race to have awarded both first and second with the same race time. However, timing equipment at the time could only measure to a tenth of a second.)seconds	1975 Dutch TT
2	(Spain) Àlex Crivillé (1st) (Australia) Mick Doohan (2nd)	0.002 seconds	1996 Czech GP
2	(Spain) Toni Elías (1st) (Italy) Valentino Rossi (2nd)	0.002 seconds	2006 Portuguese GP
4	(Italy) Valentino Rossi (1st) (Italy) Max Biaggi (2nd)	0.013 seconds	2001 Australian GP
4	(Spain) **Álex Rins** (1st) (Spain) **Marc Márquez** (2nd)	0.013 seconds	2019 British GP
6	(Australia) Casey Stoner (1st) (United States) Ben Spies (2nd)	0.015 seconds	2011 Valencian GP

== Sprint records ==
=== Total sprint wins ===
	Rider	Wins
1	(Spain) **Marc Márquez**	25
2	(Spain) **Jorge Martín**	20
3	(Italy) **Francesco Bagnaia**	14
4	(Spain) **Álex Márquez**	6
5	(Italy) **Marco Bezzecchi**	4
6	(South Africa) **Brad Binder**	2
6	(Spain) **Maverick Viñales**	2
6	(Spain) **Aleix Espargaró**	2
6	(Italy) **Enea Bastianini**	2
6	(Spain) **Raúl Fernández**	2
6	(Spain) **Pedro Acosta**	2

=== Most consecutive sprint wins ===
	Rider	Wins	Details
1	(Spain) **Marc Márquez**	8	(2025 Aragon GP–2025 Catalan GP)
2	(Spain) **Marc Márquez**	6	(2025 Thai GP–2025 French GP)
3	(Spain) **Jorge Martín**	5 (Note: 2023 AustralianGP sprint was cancelled due to weather conditions, so it doesn't count for Jorge Martin's record.)	(2023 San Marino GP–2023 Thai GP)
4	(Spain) **Jorge Martín**	3	(2023 Qatar GP–2024 Qatar GP)
4	(Italy) **Francesco Bagnaia**	3	(2024 Emilia Romagna GP–2024 Japanese GP)
4	(Spain) **Marc Márquez**	3	(2026 Japanese GP–2026 Australian GP)
7	(Spain) **Maverick Viñales**	2	(2024 Portuguese GP–2024 American GP)
7	(Spain) **Jorge Martín**	2	(2024 Spanish GP–2024 French GP)
7	(Italy) **Francesco Bagnaia**	2	(2024 Italian GP–2024 Dutch TT)
7	(Italy) **Marco Bezzecchi**	2	(2025 Indonesian GP–2025 Australian GP)
7	(Spain) **Álex Márquez**	2	(2025 Portuguese GP–2025 Valencian GP)
7	(Spain) **Marc Márquez**	2	(2026 Aragon GP–2026 San Marino GP)

== Podium finishes ==
=== Total podium finishes ===
	Rider	Podiums	Starts
1	(Italy) Valentino Rossi	199	372
2	(Spain) **Marc Márquez**	134	224
3	(Spain) Jorge Lorenzo	114	203
4	(Spain) Dani Pedrosa	112	221
5	(Australia) Mick Doohan	95	137
6	(Italy) Giacomo Agostini	88	130
7	(United States) Eddie Lawson	78	127
8	(Australia) Casey Stoner	69	115
9	(United States) Wayne Rainey	64	82
10	(Italy) **Francesco Bagnaia**	63	146

=== Percentage podium finishes (minimum 15 races) ===
	Rider	Seasons	Starts	Podiums	Percentage
1	(United Kingdom) John Surtees	1952, 1954–1960	26	24	92.31%
2	(United Kingdom) Phil Read	1961–1964, 1971, 1973–1976	38	34	89.47%
3	(United Kingdom) Geoff Duke	1950–1959	37	32	86.49%
4	(United Kingdom) Mike Hailwood	1958–1967	59	48	81.36%
5	(United States) Wayne Rainey	1988–1993	82	64	78.05%
6	(Italy) Umberto Masetti	1950–1952, 1954–1958	22	17	77.27%
7	(Italy) Alberto Pagani	1961, 1968–1972	18	13	72.22%
8	(United States) Kenny Roberts	1978–1983	56	39	69.64%
9	(Australia) Mick Doohan	1989–1999	137	95	69.34%
10	(Italy) Giacomo Agostini	1965–1977	130	88	67.69%

=== Most podium finishes in a season ===
	Rider	Season	Podiums	Races
1	(Spain) **Marc Márquez**	2019	18	19
2	(Italy) Valentino Rossi	2003	16	16
2	(Italy) Valentino Rossi	2005	16	17
2	(Italy) Valentino Rossi	2008	16	18
2	(Spain) Jorge Lorenzo	2010	16	18
2	(Australia) Casey Stoner	2011	16	17
2	(Spain) Jorge Lorenzo	2012	16	18
2	(Spain) **Marc Márquez**	2013	16	18
2	(Italy) **Francesco Bagnaia**	2024	16	20
2	(Spain) **Jorge Martín**	2024	16	20

=== Most consecutive podium finishes ===
	Rider	Season	Consecutive podium finishes	Podiums
1	(Italy) Valentino Rossi	2002–2004	2002 Portuguese–2004 South African	23
2	(Italy) Giacomo Agostini	1967–1969	1967 Nations–1969 Ulster	22
3	(Australia) Casey Stoner	2011–2012	2011 Portuguese–2012 French	19
4	(Australia) Mick Doohan	1994–1995	1994 Australian–1995 Japanese	17
5	(Italy) Valentino Rossi	2014–2015	2014 Japanese–2015 British	16
5	(Spain) **Marc Márquez**	2019	2019 Spanish–2019 Valencian	16
7	(United States) Wayne Rainey	1989–1990	1989 Czechoslovak–1990 Czechoslovak	15
8	(Australia) Mick Doohan	1997	1997 Malaysian–1997 Indonesian	14
8	(Italy) Valentino Rossi	2004–2005	2004 Malaysian–2005 Czech Republic	14
10	(Australia) Mick Doohan	1991–1992	1991 French–1992 German	13
10	(Italy) Valentino Rossi	2001–2002	2001 Pacific–2002 German	13
10	(Spain) Jorge Lorenzo	2009–2010	2009 Valencian–2010 San Marino	13

=== Most consecutive podium finishes from first race of season ===
	Rider	Season	Consecutive podium finishes	Podiums
1	(Italy) Valentino Rossi	2003	Japanese–Valencian	16
2	(Australia) Mick Doohan	1994	Australian–European	14
2	(Australia) Mick Doohan	1997	Malaysian–Indonesian	14
4	(United States) Wayne Rainey	1990	Japanese–Czechoslovak	13
5	(Spain) Jorge Lorenzo	2010	Qatar–San Marino	12
5	(Italy) Valentino Rossi	2015	Qatar–British	12
7	(Italy) Valentino Rossi	2005	Spanish–Czech Republic	11
8	(Italy) Giacomo Agostini	1968	German–Nations	10
8	(Italy) Giacomo Agostini	1969	Spanish–Ulster	10
8	(Spain) **Marc Márquez**	2014	Qatar–Indianapolis	10

=== Youngest riders to score a podium finish ===
(only the first podium finish for each rider is listed)

	Rider	Age	Place	Race
1	(United States) Randy Mamola	19 years, 261 days	2nd	1979 Finnish Grand Prix
2	(Argentina) Eduardo Salatino	19 years, 274 days	3rd	1962 Argentine Grand Prix
3	(Spain) **Pedro Acosta**	19 years, 304 days	3rd	2024 Portuguese Grand Prix
4	(Japan) Norifumi Abe	20 years, 10 days	3rd	1995 Rio de Janeiro Grand Prix
5	(Spain) **Fermín Aldeguer**	20 years, 36 days	3rd	2025 French Grand Prix
6	(Spain) **Marc Márquez**	20 years, 49 days	3rd	2013 Qatar Grand Prix
7	(France) **Fabio Quartararo**	20 years, 57 days	2nd	2019 Catalan Grand Prix
8	(United Kingdom) Mike Hailwood	20 years, 77 days	3rd	1960 Isle of Man TT
9	(Venezuela) Johnny Cecotto	20 years, 91 days	2nd	1976 French Grand Prix
10	(United States) Freddie Spencer	20 years, 98 days	3rd	1982 Argentine Grand Prix

=== Most career podium finishes without a World Championship ===
	Rider	Seasons	Starts	Wins	Podiums
1	(Spain) Dani Pedrosa	2006–2018, 2021, 2023–2024	221	31	112
2	(Italy) Andrea Dovizioso	2008–2022	248	15	62
3	(Italy) Max Biaggi	1998–2005	127	13	58
4	(United States) Randy Mamola	1979–1990, 1992	142	13	54
5	(Italy) Loris Capirossi	1995–1996, 2000–2011	217	9	42
6	(Spain) **Maverick Viñales**	2015–2026	206	10	35
7	(Brazil) Alex Barros	1990–2005, 2007	245	7	32
8	(Spain) Sete Gibernau	1997–2006, 2009	159	9	30
9	(Australia) Jack Findlay	1958–1978	137	3	24
9	(Italy) Luca Cadalora	1989, 1993–2000	83	8	24
9	(Spain) Carlos Checa	1995–2007, 2010	194	2	24

=== Most career podium finishes without a win ===
	Rider	Seasons	Starts	Podiums
1	(United States) Colin Edwards	2003–2014	196	12
2	(New Zealand) Graeme Crosby	1980–1982	27	10
3	(Australia) Bob Brown	1955–1960	16	9
3	(United Kingdom) Peter Williams	1966–1973	14	9
3	(France) Raymond Roche	1978, 1980–1989	76	9
3	(United Kingdom) Ron Haslam	1977–1993	107	9
7	(South Africa) Paddy Driver	1958–1965	22	8
7	(Spain) **Pol Espargaró**	2014–2026	178	8
9	(Italy) Carlo Bandirola	1950–1956, 1958	15	7
9	(United States) Steve Baker	1977–1978	15	7
9	(United Kingdom) Niall Mackenzie	1984–1995	104	7

=== Most races before scoring a podium finish ===
	Start	Rider	Race
1	86th race	(Spain) **Pol Espargaró**	2018 Valencian Grand Prix
2	81st race	(United States) John Hopkins	2007 Chinese Grand Prix
3	76th race	(Spain) **Raúl Fernández**	2025 Australian Grand Prix
4	72nd race	(Spain) **Aleix Espargaró**	2014 Aragon Grand Prix
5	62nd race	(Italy) Danilo Petrucci	2015 British Grand Prix
6	60th race	(United Kingdom) Jeremy McWilliams	2000 Italian Grand Prix
7	51st race	(Spain) Joan Garriga	1992 British Grand Prix
8	47th race	(France) Olivier Jacque	2005 Chinese Grand Prix
9	45th race	(Spain) Álvaro Bautista	2012 San Marino Grand Prix
10	42nd race	(United States) Kenny Roberts Jr.	1999 Malaysian Grand Prix

=== Most seasons with a podium finish ===
	Rider	Seasons	Total
1	(Italy) Valentino Rossi	2000–2020	21
2	(Brazil) Alex Barros	1992–1994, 1996–2005, 2007	14
3	(Italy) Giacomo Agostini	1965–1977	13
3	(Spain) **Marc Márquez**	2013–2019, 2021–2026	13
5	(Spain) Dani Pedrosa	2006–2017	12
5	(Italy) Andrea Dovizioso	2008–2012, 2014–2020	12
7	(Australia) Jack Findlay	1963, 1966–1969, 1971–1973, 1975–1977	11
7	(United States) Randy Mamola	1979–1988, 1992	11
7	(Australia) Mick Doohan	1989–1999	11
7	(Italy) Loris Capirossi	1995–1996, 2000–2008	11
7	(Spain) Jorge Lorenzo	2008–2018	11

=== Most consecutive seasons with a podium finish ===
	Rider	Seasons	Total
1	(Italy) Valentino Rossi	2000–2020	21
2	(Italy) Giacomo Agostini	1965–1977	13
3	(Spain) Dani Pedrosa	2006–2017	12
4	(Australia) Mick Doohan	1989–1999	11
4	(Spain) Jorge Lorenzo	2008–2018	11
6	(United Kingdom) Geoff Duke	1950–1959	10
6	(United States) Randy Mamola	1979–1988	10
6	(United States) Eddie Lawson	1983–1992	10
6	(Spain) Àlex Crivillé	1992–2001	10
6	(Brazil) Alex Barros	1996–2005	10

=== Closest ever podium finishes ===
	Riders	Duration	Details
1	(Japan) Tadayuki Okada (1st) (Italy) Max Biaggi (2nd) (France) Régis Laconi (3rd)	0.124 seconds	1999 Australian motorcycle Grand Prix
2	(Spain) Toni Elías (1st) (Italy) Valentino Rossi (2nd) (United States) Kenny Roberts Jr. (3rd)	0.176 seconds	2006 Portuguese motorcycle Grand Prix
3	(Spain) **Álex Rins** (1st) (Spain) **Marc Márquez** (2nd) (Italy) **Francesco Bagnaia** (3rd)	0.224 seconds	2022 Australian motorcycle Grand Prix
4	(Spain) **Jorge Martín** (1st) (South Africa) **Brad Binder** (2nd) (Italy) **Francesco Bagnaia** (3rd)	0.253 seconds	2023 Thailand motorcycle Grand Prix
5	(Japan) Norifumi Abe (1st) (Italy) Max Biaggi (2nd) (United States) Kenny Roberts Jr. (3rd)	0.257 seconds	1999 Brazilian motorcycle Grand Prix
6	(Italy) Valentino Rossi (1st) (Italy) Marco Melandri (2nd) (United States) Nicky Hayden (3rd)	0.266 seconds	2006 German motorcycle Grand Prix
7	(United States) Wayne Rainey (1st) (United States) Kevin Schwantz (2nd) (Australia) Daryl Beattie (3rd)	0.287 seconds	1993 Japanese motorcycle Grand Prix
8	(Italy) Max Biaggi (1st) (Italy) Loris Capirossi (2nd) (Italy) Valentino Rossi (3rd)	0.288 seconds	2000 Australian motorcycle Grand Prix
9	(Italy) Andrea Dovizioso (1st) (Spain) **Marc Márquez** (2nd) (United Kingdom) **Cal Crutchlow** (3rd)	0.320 seconds	2019 Qatar motorcycle Grand Prix
10	(Italy) Danilo Petrucci (1st) (Spain) **Marc Márquez** (2nd) (Italy) Andrea Dovizioso (3rd)	0.388 seconds	2019 Italian motorcycle Grand Prix

== Points ==
Throughout the history of the 500cc/MotoGP World Championship, the points-scoring positions and the number of points awarded to each position have varied – see the List of FIM World Championship points scoring systems for details.

=== Total points ===
	Rider	Seasons	Points
1	(Italy) Valentino Rossi	2000–2021	5415
2	(Spain) **Marc Márquez**	2013–2026	3994
3	(Spain) Dani Pedrosa	2006–2018, 2021, 2023–2024	3015
4	(Spain) Jorge Lorenzo	2008–2019	2899
5	(Italy) Andrea Dovizioso	2008–2022	2583
6	(Australia) Mick Doohan	1989–1999	2283
7	(Brazil) Alex Barros	1990–2005, 2007	2079
8	(Italy) **Francesco Bagnaia**	2019–2026	2044
9	(Italy) Loris Capirossi	1995–1996, 2000–2011	1840
10	(Australia) Casey Stoner	2006–2012	1815

=== Total races finished in the points ===
	Rider	Points finishes
1	(Italy) Valentino Rossi	325
2	(Italy) Andrea Dovizioso	209
3	(Brazil) Alex Barros	199
4	(Spain) **Marc Márquez**	198
5	(Spain) Dani Pedrosa	193
6	(Spain) **Aleix Espargaró**	191
7	(United States) Nicky Hayden	175
8	(Spain) Jorge Lorenzo	172
8	(Spain) **Maverick Viñales**	172
10	(Italy) Loris Capirossi	171

=== Most consecutive points finishes ===
	Rider	Points finishes	Races
1	(Australia) Mick Doohan	37	1995 Italian Grand Prix–1997 Indonesian Grand Prix
2	(United States) Colin Edwards	34	2004 Qatar Grand Prix–2006 Malaysian Grand Prix
3	(Australia) Wayne Gardner	30	1986 German Grand Prix–1988 German Grand Prix
4	(United States) Eddie Lawson	28	1983 Nations Grand Prix–1985 Yugoslavian Grand Prix
4	(Italy) Valentino Rossi	28	2002 Portuguese Grand Prix–2004 Dutch TT
6	(United States) Eddie Lawson	26	1987 British Grand Prix–1989 Spanish Grand Prix
6	(Italy) Valentino Rossi	26	2013 Catalan Grand Prix–2014 San Marino Grand Prix
6	(United Kingdom) Bradley Smith	26	2014 San Marino Grand Prix– 2016 Argentine Grand Prix
9	(Spain) Jorge Lorenzo	25	2009 Malaysian Grand Prix–2011 Catalan Grand Prix
9	(Italy) Valentino Rossi	25	2010 German Grand Prix–2011 Aragon Grand Prix

=== Most points in a season (before 2023) ===
This table only lists the seasons prior to 2023, when sprints were introduced in all Grands Prix.

	Rider	Points	Season	WC	Races	% of max points possible
1	(Spain) **Marc Márquez**	420	2019	1st	19	88.42%
2	(Spain) Jorge Lorenzo	383	2010	1st	18	85.11%
3	(Italy) Valentino Rossi	373	2008	1st	18	82.89%
4	(Italy) Valentino Rossi	367	2005	1st	17	86.35%
4	(Australia) Casey Stoner	367	2007	1st	18	81.56%
6	(Spain) **Marc Márquez**	362	2014	1st	18	80.44%
7	(Italy) Valentino Rossi	357	2003	1st	16	89.25%
8	(Italy) Valentino Rossi	355	2002	1st	16	88.75%
9	(Australia) Casey Stoner	350	2011	1st	18	77.78%
9	(Spain) Jorge Lorenzo	350	2012	1st	18	77.78%

=== Most career points without being World Champion ===
	Rider	Points	Best WC finish
1	(Spain) Dani Pedrosa	3015	2nd in 2007, 2010, and 2012
2	(Italy) Andrea Dovizioso	2583	2nd in 2017, 2018, and 2019
3	(Brazil) Alex Barros	2079	4th in 1996, 2000, 2001, 2002, and 2004
4	(Italy) Loris Capirossi	1840	3rd in 2001 and 2006
5	(Spain) **Maverick Viñales**	1776	3rd in 2017 and 2019
6	(Italy) Max Biaggi	1624	2nd in 1998, 2001 and 2002
7	(Spain) Carlos Checa	1485	4th in 1998
8	(Spain) **Aleix Espargaró**	1484	4th in 2022
9	(Spain) Sete Gibernau	1326	2nd in 2003 and 2004
10	(United States) Colin Edwards	1242	4th in 2005

=== World Champions with fewest career points ===
	Rider	Points	World Champion year(s)
1	(Italy) Libero Liberati	48	1957
2	(United Kingdom) Leslie Graham	72	1949
3	(Wales) (Federation of Rhodesia and Nyasaland) Gary Hocking	74	1961
4	(Italy) Umberto Masetti	117	1950 and 1952
5	(United Kingdom) John Surtees	192	1956, 1958, 1959, and 1960
6	(United Kingdom) Geoff Duke	231	1951, 1953, 1954, and 1955
7	(Italy) Franco Uncini	269	1982
8	(United Kingdom) Mike Hailwood	313	1962, 1963, 1964, and 1965
9	(United Kingdom) Phil Read	327	1973 and 1974
10	(Italy) Marco Lucchinelli	361	1981

=== Most seasons with a points finish ===
	Rider	Seasons	Total
1	(Italy) Valentino Rossi	2000–2021	22
2	(Australia) Jack Findlay	1961–1977	17
2	(Brazil) Alex Barros	1990–2005, 2007	17
4	(Spain) Dani Pedrosa	2006–2018, 2021, 2023–2024	16
5	(Italy) Andrea Dovizioso	2008–2022	15
5	(Spain) **Aleix Espargaró**	2009–2010, 2012–2024	15
7	(Spain) Carlos Checa	1995–2007, 2010	14
7	(Italy) Loris Capirossi	1995–1996, 2000–2011	14
7	(United States) Nicky Hayden	2003–2016	14
10	(Italy) Giacomo Agostini	1965–1977	13
10	(United States) Randy Mamola	1979–1990, 1992	13
10	(Spain) **Marc Márquez**	2013–2019, 2021–2026	13

=== Most consecutive seasons with a points finish ===
	Rider	Seasons	Total
1	(Italy) Valentino Rossi	2000–2021	22
2	(Australia) Jack Findlay	1961–1977	17
3	(Brazil) Alex Barros	1990–2005	16
4	(Italy) Andrea Dovizioso	2008–2022	15
5	(United States) Nicky Hayden	2003–2016	14
6	(Italy) Giacomo Agostini	1965–1977	13
6	(Spain) Carlos Checa	1995–2007	13
6	(Spain) Dani Pedrosa	2006–2018	13
6	(Spain) **Aleix Espargaró**	2012–2024	13
10	(Italy) Loris Capirossi	2000–2011	12

== Pole positions ==
=== Total pole positions ===
	Rider	Pole positions
1	(Spain) **Marc Márquez**	78
2	(Australia) Mick Doohan	58
3	(Italy) Valentino Rossi	55
4	(Spain) Jorge Lorenzo	43
5	(Australia) Casey Stoner	39
6	(Spain) Dani Pedrosa	31
7	(United States) Kevin Schwantz	29
8	(Italy) **Francesco Bagnaia**	28
9	(United States) Freddie Spencer	27
10	(Spain) **Jorge Martín**	24

=== Percentage pole positions ===
	Rider	Seasons	Starts	Pole positions	Percentage
1	(United Kingdom) Tony Rutter	1974–1975	2	1	50.00%
1	(France) Jean Lafond	1983	2	1	50.00%
3	(United States) Freddie Spencer	1980–1987,1989, 1993	62	27	43.55%
4	(Venezuela) Johnny Cecotto	1975–1980	28	12	42.86%
5	(Australia) Mick Doohan	1989–1999	137	58	42.34%
6	(Spain) **Marc Márquez**	2013–2026	224	78	34.82%
7	(Australia) Casey Stoner	2006–2012	115	39	33.91%
8	(United States) Kenny Roberts	1978–1983	56	18	32.14%
9	(United States) Kevin Schwantz	1986–1995	105	29	27.62%
10	(Spain) **Jorge Martín**	2021–2026	99	24	24.24%

=== Percentage pole positions (minimum 15 races) ===
	Rider	Seasons	Starts	Pole positions	Percentage
1	(United States) Freddie Spencer	1980–1987, 1989, 1993	62	27	43.55%
2	(Venezuela) Johnny Cecotto	1975–1980	28	12	42.86%
3	(Australia) Mick Doohan	1989–1999	137	58	42.34%
4	(Spain) **Marc Márquez**	2013–2026	224	78	34.82%
5	(Australia) Casey Stoner	2006–2012	115	39	33.91%
6	(United States) Kenny Roberts	1978–1983	56	18	32.14%
7	(United States) Kevin Schwantz	1986–1995	105	29	27.62%
8	(Spain) **Jorge Martín**	2021–2026	99	24	24.24%
9	(United Kingdom) Phil Read	1961–1964, 1971,1973–1976	18 (Note: Read had 18 starts since 1974, the season when pole positions where first officially recorded.)	4	22.22%
10	(United Kingdom) Barry Sheene	1974–1984	88	19	21.59%

=== Most pole positions in a season ===
	Rider	Season	Pole positions
1	(Spain) **Marc Márquez**	2014	13
2	(Australia) Mick Doohan	1997	12
2	(Australia) Casey Stoner	2011	12
4	(United States) Freddie Spencer	1985	10
4	(Australia) Wayne Gardner	1987	10
4	(Spain) **Marc Márquez**	2019	10
7	(United States) Kevin Schwantz	1989	9
7	(Australia) Mick Doohan	1995	9
7	(Italy) Valentino Rossi	2003	9
7	(Australia) Casey Stoner	2008	9
7	(Spain) **Marc Márquez**	2013	9

=== Most consecutive pole positions ===
	Rider	Pole positions	Races
1	(Australia) Mick Doohan	12	1997 Italian–1997 Australian
2	(United States) Freddie Spencer	9	1985 German–1985 Swedish
3	(Australia) Casey Stoner	7	2008 Catalan–2008 San Marino
3	(Spain) **Marc Márquez**	7	2013 Valencian–2014 Italian
5	(Italy) Marco Lucchinelli	6	1981 Nations–1981 San Marino
5	(United States) Kevin Schwantz	6	1989 Nations–1989 Belgian
5	(Australia) Mick Doohan	6	1992 Australian–1992 German
5	(Australia) Mick Doohan	6	1995 Australian–1995 Italian
9	(Australia) Wayne Gardner	5	1987 German–1987 Dutch TT
9	(France) Christian Sarron	5	1988 Austrian–1988 French
9	(United States) Kevin Schwantz	5	1993 Australian–1993 Austrian
9	(Italy) Max Biaggi	5	2001 British–2001 Valencian
9	(Italy) Valentino Rossi	5	2002 Japanese–2002 Italian
9	(Italy) Valentino Rossi	5	2003 Malaysian–2004 Spanish
9	(Spain) Jorge Lorenzo	5	2010 British–2010 United States
9	(Australia) Casey Stoner	5	2011 Indianapolis–2011 Australian
9	(France) **Fabio Quartararo**	5	2021 Portuguese–2021 Catalan
9	(Italy) **Francesco Bagnaia**	5	2021 Aragon–2021 Algarve

=== Most pole positions at the same Grand Prix ===
	Rider	Pole positions	Grand Prix	Seasons
1	(Spain) **Marc Márquez**	9	German Grand Prix	2013, 2014, 2015, 2016, 2017, 2018, 2019, 2025, 2026
2	(Spain) **Marc Márquez**	8	Grand Prix of the Americas	2013, 2014, 2015, 2016, 2017, 2018, 2019, 2025
3	(Italy) Valentino Rossi	7	Italian Grand Prix	2001, 2002, 2003, 2005, 2008, 2016, 2018
3	(Spain) **Marc Márquez**	7	Aragon Grand Prix	2013, 2014, 2015, 2016, 2019, 2024, 2025
5	(Spain) **Marc Márquez**	6	Argentine Grand Prix	2014, 2015, 2016, 2017, 2019, 2025
5	(Spain) **Marc Márquez**	6	Australian Grand Prix	2014, 2015, 2016, 2017, 2018, 2026
7	(Australia) Mick Doohan	5	German Grand Prix	1991, 1992, 1994, 1995, 1997
7	(Australia) Mick Doohan	5	Italian Grand Prix	1992, 1995, 1996, 1997, 1998
7	(Australia) Mick Doohan	5	Australian Grand Prix	1990, 1992, 1995, 1997, 1998
7	(Australia) Casey Stoner	5	Australian Grand Prix	2008, 2009, 2010, 2011, 2012
7	(Spain) Jorge Lorenzo	5	Spanish Grand Prix	2008, 2009, 2012, 2013, 2015
7	(Italy) Valentino Rossi	5	Dutch TT	2002, 2004, 2005, 2009, 2015
7	(Italy) Valentino Rossi	5	Spanish Grand Prix	2001, 2002, 2004, 2005, 2016
7	(Spain) **Marc Márquez**	5	British Grand Prix	2013, 2014, 2015, 2017, 2019

=== Most consecutive pole positions at the same Grand Prix ===
	Rider	Pole positions	Grand Prix	Seasons
1	(Spain) **Marc Márquez**	7	Grand Prix of the Americas	2013, 2014, 2015, 2016, 2017, 2018, 2019
1	(Spain) **Marc Márquez**	7	German Grand Prix	2013, 2014, 2015, 2016, 2017, 2018, 2019
3	(Australia) Casey Stoner	5	Australian Grand Prix	2008, 2009, 2010, 2011, 2012
3	(Spain) **Marc Márquez**	5	Australian Grand Prix	2014, 2015, 2016, 2017, 2018
5	(United States) Freddie Spencer	4	German Grand Prix	1982, 1983, 1984, 1985
5	(Australia) Mick Doohan	4	British Grand Prix	1994, 1995, 1996, 1997
5	(Australia) Mick Doohan	4	Italian Grand Prix	1995, 1996, 1997, 1998
5	(Spain) Jorge Lorenzo	4	Portuguese Grand Prix	2008, 2009, 2010, 2011
5	(Australia) Casey Stoner	4	Valencian Grand Prix	2008, 2009, 2010, 2011
5	(Spain) Jorge Lorenzo	4	United States Grand Prix	2009, 2010, 2011, 2012
5	(Spain) **Marc Márquez**	4	Aragon Grand Prix	2013, 2014, 2015, 2016
5	(Spain) **Marc Márquez**	4	Argentine Grand Prix	2014, 2015, 2016, 2017

=== Youngest polesitters ===
(only the first pole position for each rider is listed)

	Rider	Age	Race
1	(France) **Fabio Quartararo**	20 years, 14 days	2019 Spanish Grand Prix
2	(Spain) **Marc Márquez**	20 years, 62 days	2013 Grand Prix of the Americas
3	(Spain) **Pedro Acosta**	20 years, 133 days	2024 Japanese Grand Prix
4	(United States) Freddie Spencer	20 years, 153 days	1982 Spanish Grand Prix
5	(Australia) Casey Stoner	20 years, 173 days	2006 Qatar Grand Prix
6	(Spain) Dani Pedrosa	20 years, 226 days	2006 Chinese Grand Prix
7	(United States) Randy Mamola	20 years, 238 days	1980 Belgian Grand Prix
8	(Spain) Jorge Lorenzo	20 years, 309 days	2008 Qatar Grand Prix
9	(Venezuela) Johnny Cecotto	21 years, 53 days	1977 Venezuelan Grand Prix
10	(Italy) Valentino Rossi	22 years, 64 days	2001 South African Grand Prix

=== Oldest polesitters ===
(only the last pole position for each rider is listed)

	Rider	Age	Race
1	(Australia) Jack Findlay	39 years, 121 days	1974 Isle of Man TT
2	(Italy) Valentino Rossi	39 years, 106 days	2018 Italian Grand Prix
3	(United Kingdom) Jeremy McWilliams	38 years, 198 days	2002 Australian Grand Prix
4	(United Kingdom) Phil Read	35 years, 235 days	1974 Czechoslovak Grand Prix
5	(Spain) **Aleix Espargaró**	35 years, 5 days	2024 British Grand Prix
6	(Brazil) Alex Barros	34 years, 180 days	2005 Portuguese Grand Prix
7	(United States) Eddie Lawson	34 years, 144 days	1992 British Grand Prix
8	(United States) Colin Edwards	34 years, 66 days	2008 Chinese Grand Prix
9	(Italy) Giacomo Agostini	34 years, 47 days	1976 Finnish Grand Prix
10	(United Kingdom) Tony Rutter	33 years, 254 days	1975 Isle of Man TT

=== Most seasons with a pole position ===
	Rider	Seasons	Total
1	(Italy) Valentino Rossi	2001–2010, 2014–2016, 2018	14
2	(Spain) **Marc Márquez**	2013–2019, 2022–2026	12
3	(Spain) Dani Pedrosa	2006–2015, 2017	11
4	(Spain) Jorge Lorenzo	2008–2016, 2018	10
5	(Australia) Mick Doohan	1990–1998	9
6	(United Kingdom) Barry Sheene	1975–1979, 1981–1982	7
6	(United States) Eddie Lawson	1984–1989, 1992	7
6	(Italy) Max Biaggi	1998–2004	7
6	(Australia) Casey Stoner	2006–2012	7
6	(Spain) **Maverick Viñales**	2017–2021, 2023–2024	7

=== Most consecutive seasons with a pole position ===
	Rider	Seasons	Total
1	(Italy) Valentino Rossi	2001–2010	10
1	(Spain) Dani Pedrosa	2006–2015	10
3	(Australia) Mick Doohan	1990–1998	9
3	(Spain) Jorge Lorenzo	2008–2016	9
5	(Italy) Max Biaggi	1998–2004	7
5	(Australia) Casey Stoner	2006–2012	7
5	(Spain) **Marc Márquez**	2013–2019	7
8	(United States) Eddie Lawson	1984–1989	6
8	(United States) Kevin Schwantz	1989–1994	6
10	(United States) Freddie Spencer	1982–1986	5
10	(Spain) **Maverick Viñales**	2017–2021	5

== Fastest laps ==
=== Total fastest laps ===
	Rider	Fastest laps
1	(Italy) Valentino Rossi	76
1	(Spain) **Marc Márquez**	76
3	(Italy) Giacomo Agostini	70
4	(Australia) Mick Doohan	46
5	(Spain) Dani Pedrosa	44
6	(United Kingdom) Mike Hailwood	37
7	(Spain) Jorge Lorenzo	30
8	(Australia) Casey Stoner	29
9	(United States) Kevin Schwantz	26
10	(United States) Kenny Roberts	24

=== Most fastest laps in a season ===
	Rider	Season	Fastest laps
1	(Italy) Giacomo Agostini	1972	12
1	(Italy) Valentino Rossi	2003	12
1	(Spain) **Marc Márquez**	2014	12
1	(Spain) **Marc Márquez**	2019	12
5	(Australia) Mick Doohan	1997	11
5	(Spain) **Marc Márquez**	2013	11
7	(Italy) Giacomo Agostini	1968	10
7	(Italy) Giacomo Agostini	1969	10
7	(Italy) Valentino Rossi	2001	10
10	(Wales) (Federation of Rhodesia and Nyasaland) Gary Hocking	1961	9
10	(Italy) Giacomo Agostini	1970	9
10	(Italy) Giacomo Agostini	1971	9
10	(Italy) Valentino Rossi	2002	9
10	(Australia) Casey Stoner	2008	9
10	(Spain) Dani Pedrosa	2012	9
10	(Spain) **Marc Márquez**	2025	9

=== Most consecutive fastest laps ===
	Rider	Season(s)	Consecutive fastest laps	Fastest laps
1	(Italy) Giacomo Agostini	1968–1969	1968 West German–1969 Ulster	20
2	(United Kingdom) Mike Hailwood	1963–1964	1963 Belgian–1964 East German	12
2	(Italy) Giacomo Agostini	1972	1972 West German–1972 Finnish	12
4	(United Kingdom) John Surtees	1958–1960	1958 Ulster–1960 Isle of Man TT	11
5	(Wales) (Federation of Rhodesia and Nyasaland) Gary Hocking	1961	1961 West German–1961 Swedish	9
5	(Italy) Giacomo Agostini	1970	1970 West German–1970 Ulster	9
7	(Italy) Giacomo Agostini	1971	1971 Austrian–1971 Finnish	8
8	(Italy) Valentino Rossi	2003	2003 Czech–2003 Valencian	7
8	(Spain) **Marc Márquez**	2014	2014 Spanish–2014 Indianapolis	7
10	(Spain) **Marc Márquez**	2015	2015 Italian–2015 Czech	6

=== Most seasons with a fastest lap scored ===
	Rider	Seasons	Total
1	(Italy) Valentino Rossi	2000–2016, 2019	18
2	(Spain) **Marc Márquez**	2013–2021, 2024–2026	12
3	(Spain) Dani Pedrosa	2006–2014, 2016–2017	11
4	(Spain) Jorge Lorenzo	2008–2016, 2018	10
5	(Italy) Giacomo Agostini	1968–1975, 1977	9
5	(Australia) Mick Doohan	1990–1998	9
7	(United Kingdom) Geoff Duke	1950–1956, 1958	8
7	(Brazil) Alex Barros	1992–1993, 1998–2000, 2002, 2004–2005	8
7	(Italy) Max Biaggi	1998–2005	8
10	(United Kingdom) Barry Sheene	1975–1979, 1981, 1984	7
10	(United States) Randy Mamola	1980–1984, 1986–1987	7
10	(Australia) Wayne Gardner	1985–1990, 1992	7
10	(United States) Kevin Schwantz	1988–1994	7

=== Most consecutive seasons with a fastest lap scored ===
	Rider	Seasons	Total
1	(Italy) Valentino Rossi	2000–2016	17
2	(Australia) Mick Doohan	1990–1998	9
2	(Spain) Dani Pedrosa	2006–2014	9
2	(Spain) Jorge Lorenzo	2008–2016	9
2	(Spain) **Marc Márquez**	2013–2021	9
6	(Italy) Giacomo Agostini	1968–1975	8
6	(Italy) Max Biaggi	1998–2005	8
8	(United Kingdom) Geoff Duke	1950–1956	7
8	(United States) Kevin Schwantz	1988–1994	7
10	(United Kingdom) Mike Hailwood	1962–1967	6
10	(United States) Kenny Roberts	1978–1983	6
10	(United States) Eddie Lawson	1984–1989	6
10	(Australia) Wayne Gardner	1985–1990	6
10	(Spain) Àlex Crivillé	1995–2000	6
10	(Australia) Casey Stoner	2007–2012	6

== Multiple rider records ==
=== Pole and win in same race ===
	Rider	Races
1	(Spain) **Marc Márquez**	47
2	(Australia) Mick Doohan	37
3	(Italy) Valentino Rossi	35
4	(Australia) Casey Stoner	22
5	(Spain) Jorge Lorenzo	18
6	(United States) Freddie Spencer	16
7	(United States) Kevin Schwantz	14
8	(Italy) **Francesco Bagnaia**	12
9	(United Kingdom) Barry Sheene	10
9	(United States) Eddie Lawson	10

=== Pole, win, and fastest lap in same race ===
This is sometimes referred to as a "hat-trick".

	Rider	Races	First	Last
1	(Spain) **Marc Márquez**	34	2013 Americas	2026 German
2	(Australia) Mick Doohan	27	1990 Hungarian	1998 Dutch
3	(Italy) Valentino Rossi	24	2001 South African	2016 Spanish
4	(Australia) Casey Stoner	14	2007 United States	2012 Australian
5	(United States) Freddie Spencer	11	1983 South African	1985 Swedish
6	(United Kingdom) Barry Sheene	9	1975 Dutch	1981 Swedish
6	(United States) Eddie Lawson	9	1984 Spanish	1988 Swedish
6	(Spain) Jorge Lorenzo	9	2008 Portuguese	2018 Catalan
9	(United States) Wayne Rainey	8	1990 Japanese	1993 Czech
9	(Spain) Dani Pedrosa	8	2006 Chinese	2017 Spanish

=== Pole, win, fastest lap, and lead every lap in same race (MotoGP era) ===
This is sometimes referred to as a "Grand Chelem".

	Rider	Races	Grand Chelems
1	(Spain) **Marc Márquez**	12	2014 Americas, 2014 Spanish, 2016 Americas, 2018 Americas, 2019 Argentine, 2019 German, 2019 Aragon, 2019 Japanese, 2024 Aragon, 2025 Aragon, 2025 German, 2026 German
2	(Australia) Casey Stoner	10	2007 USA, 2007 Czech, 2007 San Marino, 2008 British, 2008 Dutch, 2008 Valencian, 2009 Qatar, 2010 Australian, 2011 Aragon, 2011 Australian
3	(Spain) Jorge Lorenzo	5	2010 British, 2013 Japanese, 2015 Spanish, 2015 Valencian, 2016 Valencian
3	(Italy) **Francesco Bagnaia**	5 (Note: Bagnaia and Álex Márquez recorded the same fastest lap time during the 2023 Italian Grand Prix, and per FIM rules, Alex Márquez got it because he has second best lap time among them.)	2021 Algarve, 2022 Spanish, 2023 Austrian, 2024 Dutch, 2025 Japanese
5	(Spain) Dani Pedrosa	3	2010 Italian, 2010 San Marino, 2017 Spanish
6	(Italy) **Marco Bezzecchi**	2	2023 Indian, 2026 Thailand
7	(Italy) Loris Capirossi	1	2006 Spanish
7	(Italy) Valentino Rossi	1	2016 Spanish
7	(France) **Fabio Quartararo**	1	2020 Andalusian
7	(Portugal) Miguel Oliveira	1	2020 Portuguese

== Riders' Championships ==
=== Total championships ===
	Rider	Titles	Seasons
1	(Italy) Giacomo Agostini	8	1966, 1967, 1968, 1969, 1970, 1971, 1972, 1975
1	(Spain) **Marc Márquez**	8	2013, 2014, 2016, 2017, 2018, 2019, 2025, 2026
2	(Italy) Valentino Rossi	7	2001, 2002, 2003, 2004, 2005, 2008, 2009
4	(Australia) Mick Doohan	5	1994, 1995, 1996, 1997, 1998
5	(United Kingdom) Geoff Duke	4	1951, 1953, 1954, 1955
5	(United Kingdom) John Surtees	4	1956, 1958, 1959, 1960
5	(United Kingdom) Mike Hailwood	4	1962, 1963, 1964, 1965
5	(United States) Eddie Lawson	4	1984, 1986, 1988, 1989
9	(United States) Kenny Roberts	3	1978, 1979, 1980
9	(United States) Wayne Rainey	3	1990, 1991, 1992
9	(Spain) Jorge Lorenzo	3	2010, 2012, 2015

=== Most consecutive championships ===
	Rider	Titles	Seasons
1	(Italy) Giacomo Agostini	7	1966, 1967, 1968, 1969, 1970, 1971, 1972
2	(Australia) Mick Doohan	5	1994, 1995, 1996, 1997, 1998
2	(Italy) Valentino Rossi	5	2001, 2002, 2003, 2004, 2005
4	(United Kingdom) Mike Hailwood	4	1962, 1963, 1964, 1965
4	(Spain) **Marc Márquez**	4	2016, 2017, 2018, 2019
6	(United Kingdom) Geoff Duke	3	1953, 1954, 1955
6	(United Kingdom) John Surtees	3	1958, 1959, 1960
6	(United States) Kenny Roberts	3	1978, 1979, 1980
6	(United States) Wayne Rainey	3	1990, 1991, 1992
10	(United Kingdom) Phil Read	2	1973, 1974
10	(United Kingdom) Barry Sheene	2	1976, 1977
10	(United States) Eddie Lawson	2	1988, 1989
10	(Italy) Valentino Rossi	2	2008, 2009
10	(Spain) **Marc Márquez**	2	2013, 2014
10	(Spain) **Marc Márquez**	2	2025, 2026
10	(Italy) **Francesco Bagnaia**	2	2022, 2023

=== Most World Championship seasons before first title ===
	Rider	Seasons (Note: This includes partial seasons.)	First championship	Debut year
1	(United States) Kevin Schwantz	8	1993	1986
1	(Spain) Àlex Crivillé	8	1999	1992
3	(United Kingdom) Phil Read	6	1973	1961 (Note: Read did not compete in 500cc in 1965–1970 and 1972, so he won the championship in the sixth season he contested.)
3	(Italy) Marco Lucchinelli	6	1981	1976
3	(Australia) Mick Doohan	6	1994	1989
6	(United Kingdom) John Surtees	5	1956	1952
6	(Italy) Libero Liberati	5	1957	1952 (Note: Liberati did not compete in 500cc in 1954, so he won the championship in the fifth season he contested.)
6	(United Kingdom) Mike Hailwood	5	1962	1958
6	(Australia) Wayne Gardner	5	1987	1983
6	(United States) Kenny Roberts Jr.	5	2000	1996

=== Youngest World Championship winners ===
(at the moment they clinched the first/only title)

	Rider	Age	Season
1	(Spain) **Marc Márquez**	20 years, 266 days	2013
2	(United States) Freddie Spencer	21 years, 258 days	1983
3	(Australia) Casey Stoner	21 years, 342 days	2007
4	(United Kingdom) Mike Hailwood	22 years, 160 days	1962
5	(United Kingdom) John Surtees	22 years, 182 days	1956
6	(France) **Fabio Quartararo**	22 years, 187 days	2021
7	(Italy) Valentino Rossi	22 years, 240 days	2001
8	(Spain) **Joan Mir**	23 years, 75 days	2020
9	(Spain) Jorge Lorenzo	23 years, 159 days	2010
10	(Federation of Rhodesia and Nyasaland) Gary Hocking	23 years, 316 days	1961

=== Oldest World Championship winners ===
(at the moment they clinched the last/only title)

	Rider	Age	Season
1	(United Kingdom) Leslie Graham	37 years, 340 days	1949
2	(United Kingdom) Phil Read	35 years, 208 days	1974
3	(Spain) **Marc Márquez**	33 years, 278 days	2026
4	(Australia) Mick Doohan	33 years, 122 days	1998
5	(Italy) Giacomo Agostini	33 years, 69 days	1975
6	(United Kingdom) Geoff Duke	32 years, 137 days	1955
7	(United States) Wayne Rainey	31 years, 319 days	1992
8	(United States) Eddie Lawson	31 years, 190 days	1989
9	(Italy) Libero Liberati	30 years, 324 days	1957
10	(Italy) Valentino Rossi	30 years, 251 days	2009

== Other ==
Description	Record	Details
Highest average lap speed	220.720 km/h (137.149 mph)	(United Kingdom) Barry Sheene (1977 Belgian motorcycle Grand Prix)
Highest average race speed	217.370 km/h (135.067 mph)	(United Kingdom) Barry Sheene (1977 Belgian motorcycle Grand Prix)
Slowest average race speed	93.994 km/h (58.405 mph)	(Italy) Umberto Masetti (1951 Spanish motorcycle Grand Prix)
Longest race distance	301.84 miles (485.76 km)	(United Kingdom) Bob McIntyre (1957 Isle of Man Senior TT)
Shortest race distance	31.47 km (19.55 mi)	(Spain) Sete Gibernau (2004 Italian Grand Prix) (Note: Race stopped at the end of lap 17 of 23 because of rain, then re-started for the remaining 6 laps.)
Most consecutive laps led	121 laps	(Italy) **Marco Bezzecchi** (2025 Portuguese Grand Prix–2026 United States Grand Prix)
Top speed	368.6 km/h (229 mph)	(Spain) **Jorge Martín** (2026 Italian Grand Prix)
Championships
Most races left in the season when becoming World Champion	5 races	(Italy) Giacomo Agostini (1969 in round 7 of 12, 1970 in round 6 of 11, 1971 in round 6 of 11, 1972 in round 8 of 13) (Spain) **Marc Márquez** (2025 in round 17 of 22) (Note: Apart from 5 races there were 5 sprints also left in 2025 season for Márquez before he clinched the riders championship.)
Fewest races left in the season when becoming World Champion	0	(Italy) Umberto Masetti (1950 in round 6 of 6, 1952 in round 8 of 8) (Italy) Libero Liberati (1957 in round 6 of 6) (Italy) Giacomo Agostini (1966 in round 9 of 9, 1967 in round 10 of 10, 1975 in round 10 of 10) (United States) Kenny Roberts (1978 in round 11 of 11, 1979 in round 12 of 12, 1980 in round 8 of 8) (Italy) Marco Lucchinelli (1981 in round 11 of 11) (United States) Freddie Spencer (1983 in round 12 of 12) (United States) Eddie Lawson (1989 in round 15 of 15) (United States) Wayne Rainey (1992 in round 13 of 13) (United States) Kevin Schwantz (1993 in round 14 of 14) (United States) Nicky Hayden (2006 in round 17 of 17) (Spain) **Marc Márquez** (2013 in round 18 of 18, 2017 in round 18 of 18) (Spain) Jorge Lorenzo (2015 in round 18 of 18) (Italy) **Francesco Bagnaia** (2022 in round 20 of 20, 2023 in round 20 of 20) (Spain) **Jorge Martín** (2024 in round 20 of 20)
Longest time between first and last World Championship titles	4,340 days	(Spain) **Marc Márquez** (between 2013 and 2025)
Longest time between successive World Championship titles	2,184 days	(Spain) **Marc Márquez** (between 2019 and 2025)
Highest finishing position in a World Championship for a rookie (not including 1949)	1st	(Italy) Umberto Masetti (1950) (United States) Kenny Roberts (1978) (Spain) **Marc Márquez** (2013)
Riders' Championships won with most constructors	2	(United Kingdom) Geoff Duke (Norton, Gilera) (Italy) Giacomo Agostini (MV Agusta, Yamaha) (United States) Eddie Lawson (Yamaha, Honda) (Italy) Valentino Rossi (Honda, Yamaha) (Australia) Casey Stoner (Ducati, Honda) (Spain) **Marc Márquez** (Honda, Ducati)
Most World Champions competing full-time in a season	5	2025, 2026 ( (Spain) **Marc Márquez**, (Spain) **Joan Mir**, (France) **Fabio Quartararo**, (Italy) **Francesco Bagnaia**, (Spain) **Jorge Martín**)
Most World Championship seasons as runner-up	5	(Italy) Valentino Rossi (2000, 2006, 2014, 2015, 2016)
A pair of brothers finishing 1st and 2nd in the World Championship standings	2025	(Spain) **Marc Márquez** (1st) (Spain) **Álex Márquez** (2nd)
Wins
Wins at most different circuits	24	(Australia) Mick Doohan
Wins at most different countries	17	(Italy) Valentino Rossi
Wins at most different circuits in the same country	4	(Australia) Casey Stoner; Dani Pedrosa; Jorge Lorenzo; **Marc Márquez** (in Spain at Jerez, Montmelo, Aragón, and Valencia)
Wins with most different constructors	3	(United Kingdom) Mike Hailwood (Norton, MV Agusta, and Honda) (United States) Randy Mamola (Suzuki, Honda, and Yamaha) (United States) Eddie Lawson (Yamaha, Honda, and Cagiva) (Italy) Loris Capirossi (Yamaha, Honda, and Ducati) (Spain) **Maverick Viñales** (Suzuki, Yamaha, and Aprilia)
Longest time between first and last wins	6,195 days	(Italy) Valentino Rossi (2000 British Grand Prix–2017 Dutch TT)
Longest time between successive wins	3,200 days	(United Kingdom) Phil Read (1964 Ulster Grand Prix–1973 West German Grand Prix)
Closest ever win finishes	0.002 seconds	between (Spain) Àlex Crivillé (1st) (Australia) Mick Doohan (2nd) at 1996 Czech Republic motorcycle Grand Prix (Spain) Toni Elias (1st) (Italy) Valentino Rossi (2nd) at 2006 Portuguese motorcycle Grand Prix
Most different race winners in one year	9 (2016, 2020)	(Spain) Jorge Lorenzo (Spain) **Marc Márquez** (Italy) Valentino Rossi (Australia) **Jack Miller** (Italy) Andrea Iannone (United Kingdom) **Cal Crutchlow** (Spain) **Maverick Viñales** (Spain) Dani Pedrosa (Italy) Andrea Dovizioso (France) **Fabio Quartararo** (South Africa) **Brad Binder** (Italy) Andrea Dovizioso (Portugal) Miguel Oliveira (Italy) **Franco Morbidelli** (Spain) **Maverick Viñales** (Italy) Danilo Petrucci (Spain) **Álex Rins** (Spain) **Joan Mir**
Most different race winners in consecutive races	8 (2016, 2020)	(Spain) Jorge Lorenzo (2016 Italian Grand Prix) (Italy) Valentino Rossi (2016 Catalan Grand Prix) (Australia) **Jack Miller** (2016 Dutch TT) (Spain) **Marc Márquez** (2016 German Grand Prix) (Italy) Andrea Iannone (2016 Austrian Grand Prix) (United Kingdom) **Cal Crutchlow** (2016 Czech Republic Grand Prix) (Spain) **Maverick Viñales** (2016 British Grand Prix) (Spain) Dani Pedrosa (2016 San Marino Grand Prix) (South Africa) **Brad Binder** (2020 Czech Republic Grand Prix) (Italy) Andrea Dovizioso (2020 Austrian Grand Prix) (Portugal) Miguel Oliveira (2020 Styrian Grand Prix) (Italy) **Franco Morbidelli** (2020 San Marino Grand Prix) (Spain) **Maverick Viñales** (2020 Emilia Romagna Grand Prix) (France) **Fabio Quartararo** (2020 Catalan Grand Prix) (Italy) Danilo Petrucci (2020 French Grand Prix) (Spain) **Álex Rins** (2020 Aragon Grand Prix)
Most race winners competing full time in a season	19 (2026)	(Spain) **Marc Márquez** (Spain) **Álex Márquez** (Spain) **Jorge Martín** (Spain) **Fermín Aldeguer** (Spain) **Raúl Fernández** (Spain) **Joan Mir** (Spain) **Maverick Viñales** (Spain) **Álex Rins** (Spain) **Pedro Acosta** (Italy) **Marco Bezzecchi** (Italy) **Francesco Bagnaia** (Italy) **Fabio Di Giannantonio** (Italy) **Franco Morbidelli** (Italy) **Enea Bastianini** (France) **Fabio Quartararo** (France) **Johann Zarco** (Japan) **Ai Ogura** (South Africa) **Brad Binder** (Australia) **Jack Miller**
Most number of first time winners in a single season	5 (2020)	(Spain) **Joan Mir** (South Africa) **Brad Binder** (Portugal) Miguel Oliveira (Italy) **Franco Morbidelli** (France) **Fabio Quartararo**
Most Grand Prix wins to start a career, all at different circuits	12	(Italy) **Marco Bezzecchi**; 1. 2023 Argentine Republic Grand Prix, Autódromo Termas de Río Hondo; 2. 2023 French Grand Prix, Bugatti Circuit; 3. 2023 Indian Grand Prix, Buddh International Circuit; 4. 2025 British Grand Prix, Silverstone Circuit; 5. 2025 Portuguese Grand Prix, Algarve International Circuit; 6. 2025 Valencian Grand Prix, Circuit Ricardo Tormo; 7. 2026 Thailand Grand Prix, Buriram International Circuit; 8. 2026 Brazilian Grand Prix, Autódromo Internacional Ayrton Senna; 9. 2026 United States Grand Prix, Circuit of the Americas; 10. 2026 Italian Grand Prix, Mugello Circuit; 11. 2026 Indonesian Grand Prix, Mandalika International Street Circuit; 12. 2026 Qatar Grand Prix, Lusail International Circuit
Fewest race wins in World Championship winning year	1	(Spain) **Joan Mir** (2020)
World Champion with fewest career wins	1	(Spain) **Joan Mir**
Most race wins in one season without becoming World Champion	11	(Italy) **Francesco Bagnaia** (2024)
Podiums
Longest time between first and last podium finishes	7,391 days	(Italy) Valentino Rossi (2000 Spanish Grand Prix–2020 Andalusian Grand Prix)
Longest time between successive podium finishes	3,527 days	(United Kingdom) Frank Perris (1961 Argentine Grand Prix–1971 Isle of Man TT)
Closest ever podium finishes	0.124 seconds	between (Japan) Tadayuki Okada (1st) (Italy) Max Biaggi (2nd) (France) Régis Laconi (3rd) at 1999 Australian motorcycle Grand Prix
Most consecutive podium finishes (starting from debut)	6	(United States) Kenny Roberts (1978 Spanish Grand Prix–1978 Belgian Grand Prix)
Most podium finishes before a victory	19	(France) **Johann Zarco**
Most second places	61	(Italy) Valentino Rossi
Most third places	49	(Italy) Valentino Rossi
Pole positions
Largest pole margin	2.524 seconds	(Spain) **Marc Márquez** over (Australia) **Jack Miller** (at 2019 CzechGP)
Least pole margin	0.002 seconds	(Italy) Max Biaggi over (United Kingdom) Jeremy McWilliams (at 2003 GermanGP) (Spain) **Marc Márquez** over (Italy) Andrea Dovizioso (at 2018 AustrianGP)
Most pole positions in a debut season	9	(Spain) **Marc Márquez** (2013)
Fewest pole positions scored in a Championship-winning season (from 1974)	0	(United States) Wayne Rainey (1992) (Spain) **Joan Mir** (2020)
Longest time between first and last pole positions	6,251 days	(Italy) Valentino Rossi (2001 South African Grand Prix–2018 Italian Grand Prix)
Longest time between successive pole positions	2,485 days	(Spain) **Aleix Espargaró** (2015 Catalan Grand Prix–2022 Argentine Republic Grand Prix)
Most races before first pole position	136	(Brazil) Alex Barros
Most pole positions without a victory	4	(New Zealand) Graeme Crosby
Most polesitters in one year	10 (2022)	(Spain) **Jorge Martín** (France) **Fabio Quartararo** (Spain) **Aleix Espargaró** (France) **Johann Zarco** (Italy) **Francesco Bagnaia** (Italy) **Fabio Di Giannantonio** (Italy) **Enea Bastianini** (Australia) **Jack Miller** (Spain) **Marc Márquez** (Italy) **Marco Bezzecchi**
Finishes
Most race finishes	333	(Italy) Valentino Rossi
Longest time between first and last points finishes	8,225 days	(Japan) Shinichi Ito (1989 Japanese Grand Prix–2011 Japanese Grand Prix)
Longest time between successive points finishes	5,481 days	(Republic of Ireland) Wilf Herron (1956 Ulster Grand Prix–1971 Ulster Grand Prix)
Closest ever top 15 finishes	8.928 seconds	(France) **Fabio Quartararo** (1st) (France) **Johann Zarco** (2nd) (Spain) **Jorge Martín** (3rd) (Spain) **Álex Rins** (4th) (Spain) **Maverick Viñales** (5th) (Italy) **Francesco Bagnaia** (6th) (Spain) **Joan Mir** (7th) (South Africa) **Brad Binder** (8th) (Australia) **Jack Miller** (9th) (Spain) **Aleix Espargaró** (10th) (Italy) **Enea Bastianini** (11th) (Italy) **Franco Morbidelli** (12th) (Spain) **Pol Espargaró** (13th) (Germany) Stefan Bradl (14th) (Portugal) Miguel Oliveira (15th) (at 2021 Doha Grand Prix)
Points
Most points between first and second in the World Championship	151 (2019)	between (Spain) **Marc Márquez** (420 pts.) and (Italy) Andrea Dovizioso (269 pts.)
Fewest points between first and second in the World Championship	0 (1967)	between (Italy) Giacomo Agostini (46 pts.) and (United Kingdom) Mike Hailwood (46 pts.)
Overcome the largest points deficit to a championship leader	102 points	(Spain) **Marc Márquez** (2026)
Seasons
Most riders to finish in the points in a season	56 (1969)	
Fewest riders to finish in the points in a season	14 (1949)	
No back-to-back race winners in a season	1949; 2023	

== See also ==
- List of Grand Prix motorcycle racing rider records
- List of MotoGP/500cc constructor records
