= David Whitworth =

British motorcycle racer

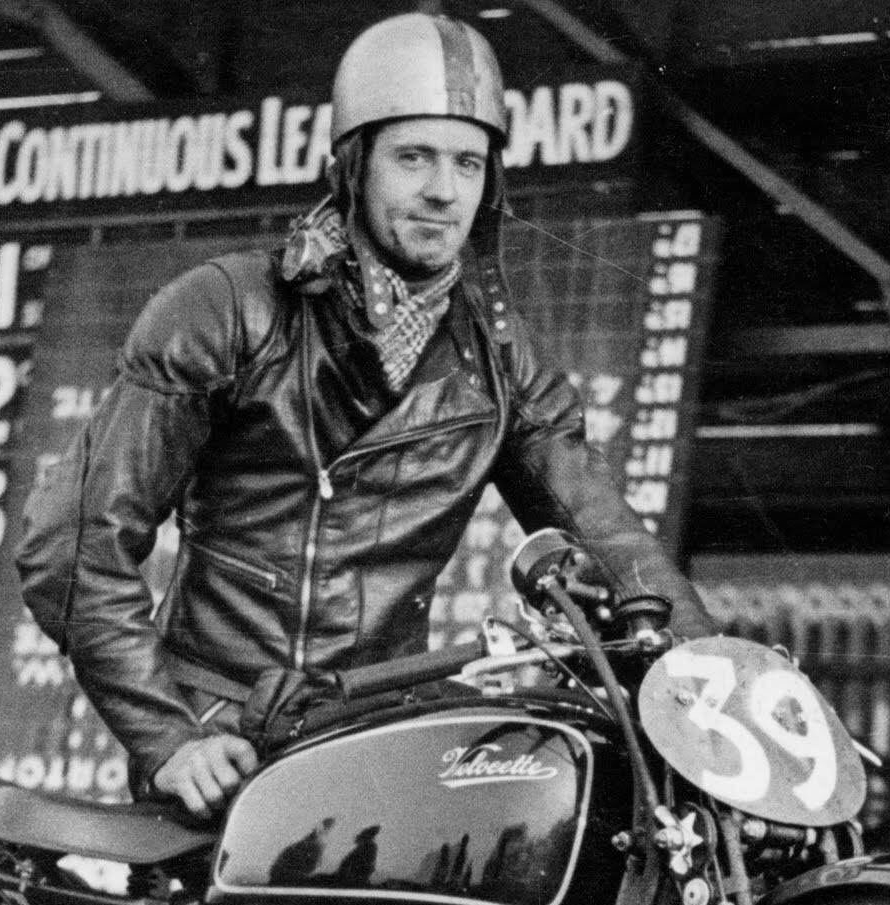
- Whitworth at the 1939 Isle of Man TT
- Nationality: British
- Born: 1904
- Died: 3 July 1950 (aged 45–46); Spa, Belgium
Motorcycle racing career statistics
Isle of Man TT career
TTs contested	6 (1937–1939, 1947, 1949–1950)
TT wins	0
TT podiums	1

Malcolm David Whitworth (1904 – 3 July 1950) was a British motorcycle racer who died in a crash at the 1950 350 cc Belgian Grand Prix.

== Career ==
Denied the chance to race abroad by World War II, Whitworth competed in numerous races in the United Kingdom. In 1935 and 1936, he competed in the Manx Grand Prix, but retired both times. In 1937, he competed in the Isle of Man TT for the first time, which was thought at the time to be the toughest race in the world. In the 250 cc Lightweight TT race, he competed on a Cotton motorcycle but failed to finish. He failed to finish in 1938 as well, but in the 350 cc Junior TT he came sixth on a Velocette. In the 500 cc race at the Ulster Grand Prix, he finished third, behind Jock West and Ginger Wood. In 1939, he finished fifth in the Junior TT and twelfth in the 500 cc Senior TT, in which he competed for the first time.

In the first post-war TT in 1947, Whitworth finished second to his teammate, Bob Foster, in the Junior TT, the best TT result of his career. He retired from the Senior TT race. On 2 May 1948, he won the prestigious, pre-season Mettet Grand Prix invitational race. In 1949, Whitworth took part in the newly created World Championship. At both the Dutch TT and the Belgian Grand Prix, Whitworth finished fourth in the 350 cc class resulting in sixth place in the overall championship standings. Outside of the championship, Whitworth won the 350 cc race at the French Grand Prix in Saint-Gaudens.

In the 1950 season, Whitworth took eleventh and nineteenth places in the Junior and Senior TT respectively. For the Senior TT, he competed for the first time as a works rider, for Triumph.

=== Fatal accident ===
On 2 July 1950, Whitworth competed in the 350 cc Belgian Grand Prix at Spa-Francorchamps. He was riding a privately entered Velocette and was in a fight for fifth place with Harold Daniell, Ted Frend and Charlie Salt. On the tenth lap, Whitworth and Salt came together, crashing heavily. Whitworth was taken to hospital where he was diagnosed with a skull fracture. The following day, Whitworth died in hospital from his injuries. In accordance with his wishes, which were to be buried close to the scene of any fatal accident he might have, he was buried in the local cemetery in Spa.

=== Legacy ===
Francesc Xavier Bultó cited Whitworth as the inspiration behind the "thumbs up" symbol used for his company Bultaco, having witnessed Whitworth giving the thumbs up to his pit crew to signify that all was well. Francesc' grandson Sete Gibernau would later use the same "thumbs up" symbol as part of his helmet design during his racing career in MotoGP.

== World Championship results ==
(key) (Races in bold indicate pole position; races in italics indicate fastest lap.)

Year	Class	Motorcycle	1	2	3	4	5	6	Rank	Points
1949			IOM	SUI	NED	BEL	ULS	NAT		
1949	350 cc	Velocette	31		4	4			6th	12
1950			IOM	BEL	NED	SUI	ULS	NAT		
1950	350 cc	Velocette	11	Ret					—	0
1950	500 cc	Triumph	19						—	0
