= List of Grand Prix motorcycle racers: W =

- (United Kingdom) Danny Webb
- (Australia) Anthony West
- (United Kingdom) Jock West
- (United Kingdom) David Whitworth
- (United Kingdom) Peter Williams
- (Australia) Warren Willing
- (Australia) Mark Willis
- (West Germany) Martin Wimmer
- (South Africa) Russel Wood
- (United Kingdom) Tommy Wood
- (United Kingdom) Derek Woodman
