= 1948 Isle of Man TT =

1948 edition of the Isle of Man Tourist Trophy, a motorcycle competition

In the 1948 Isle of Man Tourist Trophy festival Harold Daniell, lap record holder since 1938, failed to finish the 1948 Senior TT on his Norton, and victory went to Norton team member, Artie Bell, "the flying Ulsterman". Norton dominated, taking the first three places, losing fourth to Geoff Murdoch's AJS, and then filling the next four places. There were thirty three Nortons in a field of fifty six.

Artie Bell also came third in the Junior TT with Freddie Frith taking the flag for first place, and A. R. (Bob) Foster coming second, both on Velocettes. Maurice Cann won the Lightweight with his DOHC 250 cc Moto Guzzi, followed by Roland Pike on a Rudge.

Three Clubman races were again included, for the second year, in the festival with the Clubman Senior race allowing entries of motorcycles up to 1,000 cc engine capacity.

Later in 1948, at the FICM (later called FIM) meeting in London, it was decided there would be a motorcycle World Championship along Grand Prix lines. It would be a six-race annual series with points for a placing, and a point for the fastest lap of each race. There would be four classes: 500cc, 350cc, 250cc and 125cc. In the past a Grand Prix had been an individual race. In 1949 for the first time, starting with the Isle of Man TT, a series of Grand Prix races would decide who would be the 1949 World Champion.

The 1948 TT also saw the first presentation of the Jimmy Simpson Trophy, awarded to the rider who completed the fastest lap of the meeting.

== Junior TT (350cc) ==
Rank	Rider	Team	Speed	Time
1	(United Kingdom) Freddie Frith	Velocette	81.59 mph	3:14.33.6
2	(United Kingdom) Bob Foster	Velocette	79.55 mph	3:19.12.6
3	(United Kingdom) Artie Bell	Norton	78.97 mph	3:20.50.6
4	(United Kingdom) Johnny Lockett	Norton	78.80 mph	3:21.06.8
5	(United Kingdom) Maurice Cann	AJS	77.27 mph	3:25.06.6
6	(United Kingdom) Eric Briggs	Norton	77.13 mph	3:25.27.6
7	(United Kingdom) Leslie Graham	AJS	76.97 mph	3:25.54.2
8	(United Kingdom) Eric Oliver	Velocette	76.94 mph	3:25.58.8
9	(United Kingdom) S M Miller	Norton	76.11 mph	3:28.12.0
10	(United Kingdom) Tommy McEwan	AJS	76.06 mph	3:28.20.4

== Lightweight TT (250cc) ==
Rank	Rider	Team	Speed	Time
1	(United Kingdom) Maurice Cann	Moto Guzzi	75.12 mph	3:30:49.0
2	(United Kingdom) Roland Pike	Rudge	71.85 mph	3:40.33.2
3	(United Kingdom) Doug St.J Beasley	Excelsior	67.68 mph	3:54.09.0
4	(United Kingdom) Ben Drinkwater	Moto Guzzi	66.6 mph	3:57.56.2
5	(United Kingdom) Ray Petty	New Imperial	66.26 mph	3:59.11.0
6	(United Kingdom) Jock McCredie	Excelsior	64.98 mph	4:03:52.2

== Clubmans Senior TT ==
Rank	Rider	Team	Speed	Time
1	(United Kingdom) Jack D Daniells	998 Vincent HRD	80.51 mph	1.52.29.6
2	(United Kingdom) F Phil Heath	998 Vincent HRD	79.58 mph	1:53.49.0
3	(United Kingdom) Cyril A Stevens	490 Norton	76.01 mph	1:59.03.4

== Clubmans Junior TT ==
Rank	Rider	Team	Speed	Time
1	(United Kingdom) Ronnie J Hazlehurst	Velocette	70.33 mph	2.08.47.2
2	(United Kingdom) G W Robinson	AJS	70.02 mph	2:09.21.6
3	(United Kingdom) Milton Sunderland	Norton	69.58 mph	2:10.13.4

== Clubmans Lightweight TT ==
Rank	Rider	Team	Speed	Time
1	(United Kingdom) Monty Lockwood	Excelsior	64.93 mph	1.44.37.6
2	(United Kingdom) Bill G Dehany	Excelsior	63.35 mph	1:47.13.8
3	(United Kingdom) Ron Carvell	Triumph	62.53 mph	1:48.38.0

== Senior TT (500cc) ==
Rank	Rider	Team	Speed	Time
1	(United Kingdom) Artie Bell	Norton	84.969 mph	3:06.31.0
2	(United Kingdom) Bill Doran	Norton	80.338 mph	3:17.16.0
3	(United Kingdom) Jock A Weddell	Norton	79.564 mph	3:19:11.2
4	(United Kingdom) Geoff G Murdoch	AJS	78.513 mph	3:21.51.2
5	(United Kingdom) Noel Pope	Norton	78.039 mph	3:23.04.8
6	(United Kingdom) C W (Bill) Petch	Norton	77.806 mph	3:23.41.2
7	(United Kingdom) Henry Pinnington	Norton	77.343 mph	3:24.54.6
8	(United Kingdom) Jack Brett	Norton	77.307 mph	3:24.59.8
9	(Italy) Omobono Tenni	Moto Guzzi	76.857 mph	3:26.12.2
10	(United Kingdom) Eric Oliver	Velocette	76.648 mph	3:26.45.4
