= Ben Drinkwater =

English motorcycle racer (1910–1949)

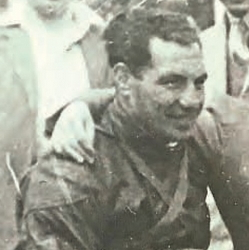
- Drinkwater after finishing third at the 1947 Lightweight TT
- Nationality: English
- Born: 13 February 1910; Rochdale, England
- Died: 9 June 1949 (aged 39); Isle of Man
Motorcycle racing career statistics
Isle of Man TT career
TTs contested	3 (1947-1949)
TT wins	0
TT podiums	1

Reuben Thomas "Ben" Drinkwater (13 February 1910 – 9 June 1949) born in Rochdale, Lancashire, England, was a railway signalman and motorcycle racer who competed in the Isle of Man TT races and the Manx Grand Prix.

After riding in the 1946 Manx Grand Prix, the first post-war event on the Snaefell Mountain Course, Drinkwater returned to race in the 1947 Isle of Man TT, finishing in third place in the controversial 1947 250 cc Lightweight TT race won by Manliff Barrington.

While competing in the 1949 350cc Junior TT race, the first ever race of the new FIM World Championship, Drinkwater collided with a bank trying to avoid a fellow competitor near Cronk Bane farm, close to the 11th milestone marker post, and was killed. The distinctive S-bend corner on the Mountain Course near to the accident location was renamed "Drinkwater's Bend" or the 11th Milestone.

== TT career summary ==
Finishing Position	3rd	4th	DNF
Number of times	1	1	3
