= 1947 Isle of Man TT =

Manx road motorcycle racing event

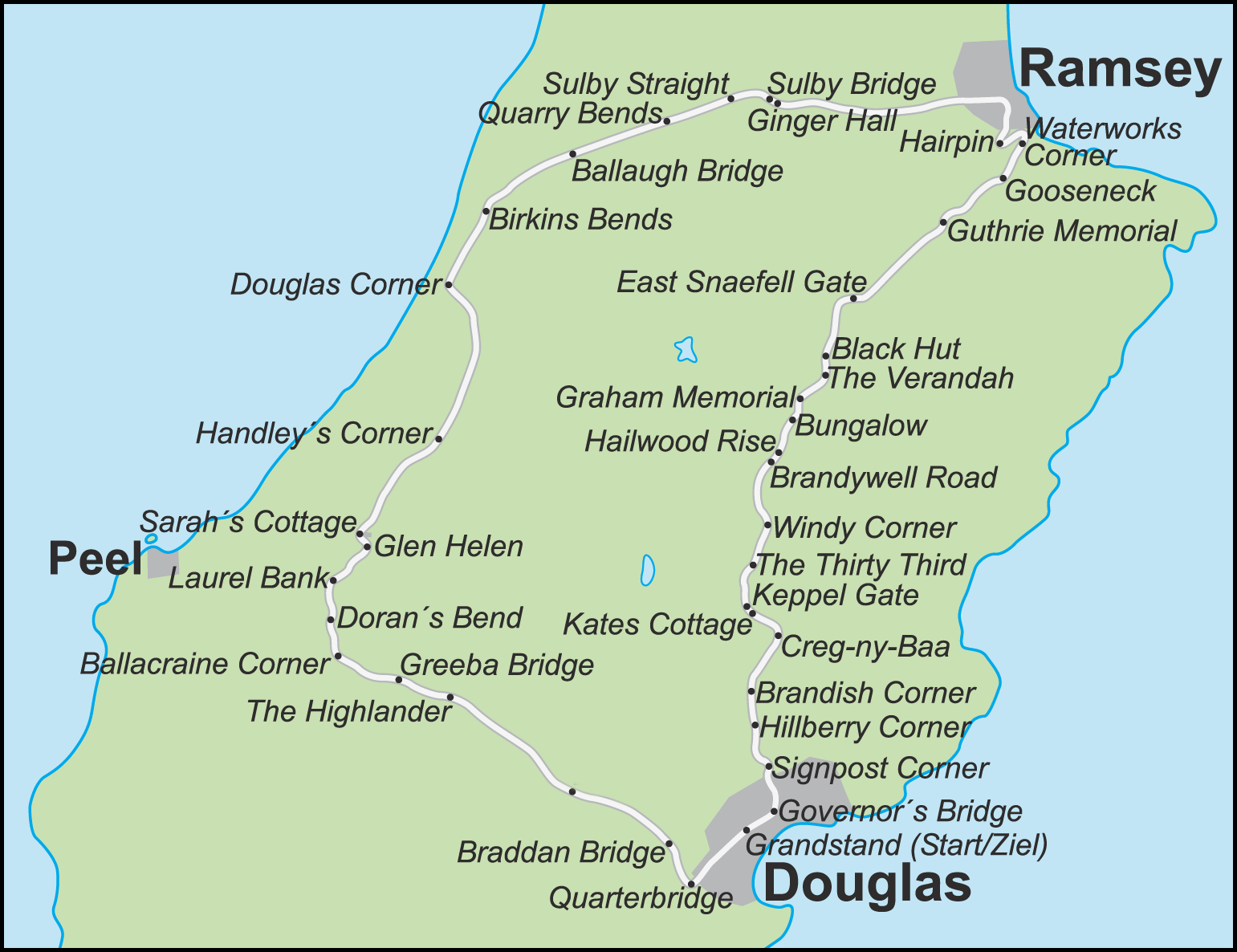
A map of the Isle of Man Tourist Trophy route

The 1947 Isle of Man Tourist Trophy was the first race festival since 1939 due to the interruption of World War II. With the restart of racing, the ACU decided to add three Clubman-class races for production machines in Lightweight, Junior and Senior categories, making the festival a six-race event. It held in 9-13 June.

Harold Daniell won the Senior TT at 82.81 mph (133.27 km/h) on a Norton and the Norton team were to dominate the Senior race until 1954. Speeds were somewhat lower than the pre-war races due to the low quality "pool" petrol available, and it would be another three years before Daniell's 1938 lap record was broken. Superchargers were banned for motorcycle racing from 1946, so that may have reduced speed too.

This was an early race appearance for the E90 AJS Porcupine, ridden to ninth in the Senior by Les Graham.

== Senior TT (500cc) ==
Rank	Rider	Team	Speed	Time
1	(United Kingdom) Harold Daniell	Norton	82.813 mph	3:11.22.2
2	(United Kingdom) Artie Bell	Norton	82.656 mph	3:11.44.2
3	(United Kingdom) Peter Goodman	Velocette	82.463 mph	3:12.11.0
4	(United Kingdom) Ted Frend	Norton	81.57 mph	3:14.17.4
5	(United Kingdom) Guy Newman	Norton	79.638 mph	3:19.00.0
6	(United Kingdom) Roy Evans	Norton	78.051 mph	3:23.02.8
7	(United Kingdom) Noel Christmas	Norton	78.048 mph	3:23.03.2
8	(United Kingdom) Bill Beevers	Norton	77.56 mph	3:24.20.0
9	(United Kingdom) Leslie Graham	AJS	77.472 mph	3:24.34.0
10	(United Kingdom) Les A Dear	Norton	75.931 mph	3:28.43.0

== Junior TT (350cc) ==
Rank	Rider	Team	Speed	Time
1	(United Kingdom) Bob Foster	Velocette	80.311 mph	3:17.20.0
2	(United Kingdom) David Whitworth	Velocette	78.677 mph	3:21.26.0
3	(United Kingdom) Jock Weddell	Velocette	76.15 mph	3:28.07.0
4	(United Kingdom) Peter Goodman	Velocette	75.822 mph	3:29.00.0
5	(United Kingdom) Les Martin	Norton	73.964 mph	3:30.30.0
6	(United Kingdom) Freddie Hudson	Norton	76.96 mph	3:34.16.0
7	(United Kingdom) Guy Newman	Velocette	73.94 mph	3:34.19.0
8	(United Kingdom) Tommy Wood	Velocette	73.28 mph	3:36.16.0
9	(United Kingdom) Eric Oliver	Norton	73.00 mph	3:37.05.0
10	(United Kingdom) Geoff Murdoch	Norton	72.99 mph	3:37.07.0

== Lightweight TT (250cc) ==
Rank	Rider	Team	Speed	Time
1	(Republic of Ireland) Manliff Barrington	Moto Guzzi	73.220 mph	3:36:26.6
2	(United Kingdom) Maurice Cann	Moto Guzzi	72.972 mph	3:37.10.8
3	(United Kingdom) Ben Drinkwater	Excelsior	70.139 mph	3:45.57.0
4	(United Kingdom) Les Archer	New Imperial	69.805 mph	3:47.02.0
5	(United Kingdom) Stan Pike	Rudge	68.559 mph	3:51.09.6
6	(United Kingdom) George Paterson	New Imperial	68.488 mph	3:51.24.0
7	(Denmark) Svend Aage Sørensen	Excelsior	67.775 mph	3:53.50.0
8	(Republic of Ireland) Paddy Johnston	CTS	67.720 mph	3:54.01.6
9	(United Kingdom) Les Martin	Excelsior	67.621 mph	3:54.22.0
10	(United Kingdom) Jack Brett	Excelsior	67.249 mph	3:55.39.6

== Clubmans Senior TT ==
Rank	Rider	Team	Speed	Time
1	(United Kingdom) Eric Briggs	Norton	78.67 mph	1:55.08.0
2	(United Kingdom) Allan Jefferies	Triumph	75.23 mph	2:00.23.0
3	(United Kingdom) Geoff Parsons	Ariel	71.26 mph	2:07.06.0

== Clubmans Junior TT ==
Rank	Rider	Team	Speed	Time
1	(United Kingdom) Denis Parkinson	Norton	70.74 mph	2:08.01.0
2	(United Kingdom) Bob Pratt	Norton	68.87 mph	2:11.30.0
3	(United Kingdom) Wilf Sleightholme	AJS	68.28 mph	2:12.39.0

== Clubmans Lightweight TT ==
Rank	Rider	Team	Speed	Time
1	(United Kingdom) Bill McVeigh	Triumph	65.30 mph	1.44.02.0
2	(United Kingdom) Basil Keys	AJS	64.27 mph	1.45.42.0
3	(United Kingdom) Les Archer	Velocette	63.73 mph	1:46.36.0

== Notes ==
- Major road widening occurred on the Snaefell mountain course at the 33rd Milestone, including the removal of fence posts at road level.
