= Denis Parkinson =

English motorcycle road racer (1915–2004)

Denis Jack Robert Parkinson (13 June 1915 – 16 March 2004) was an English Grand Prix motorcycle road racer of the 1930s, 1940s and 1950s, and a founder member and President of the Wakefield and District Motor Sports Club, and won the 1947 Isle of Man TT Clubmans Junior TT on a 350cc Norton, and the 1953 Senior Manx Grand Prix.

== Background ==
Denis Parkinson's birth was registered in Wakefield, West Riding of Yorkshire, and he died aged 88.
