= List of MotoGP/500cc constructor records =

List of MotoGP/500cc manufacturer records

This is a list of constructor/manufacturer records in the 500cc/MotoGP class of the Grand Prix motorcycle racing, since 1949. Manufacturers that have competed in the 2026 MotoGP World Championship are highlighted in bold.

This page is accurate as of the 2026 Qatar Grand Prix.

== Wins ==
=== Total wins ===
	Constructor	Wins
1	(Japan) **Honda**	314
2	(Japan) **Yamaha**	245
3	(Italy) MV Agusta	139
4	(Italy) **Ducati**	132
5	(Japan) Suzuki	97
6	(Italy) Gilera	35
7	(Italy) Norton	21
8	(Italy) **Aprilia**	17
9	(Austria) **KTM**	8
10	(United Kingdom) AJS	5
11	(Italy) Moto Guzzi	3
11	(United Kingdom) Matchless	3
11	(Italy) Cagiva	3
14	(Japan) Kawasaki	2
15	(Czech Republic) Jawa	1
15	(Italy) Linto	1
15	(Germany) König	1
15	(Italy) Sanvenero	1

=== Most consecutive wins ===
	Constructor	wins
1	(Japan) **Honda**	22
1	(Italy) **Ducati**	22
3	(Italy) MV Agusta	20
4	(Japan) Suzuki	8
5	(Italy) Gilera	6
5	(Japan) **Yamaha**	6

== Championships ==
=== Most constructor championships ===
	Constructor	Championships
1	(Japan) **Honda**	25
2	(Italy) MV Agusta	16
3	(Japan) **Yamaha**	14
4	(Japan) Suzuki	7
4	(Italy) **Ducati**	7
6	(Italy) Gilera	4
7	(United Kingdom) Norton	2
8	(United Kingdom) AJS	1

=== Most consecutive constructor championships ===
	Constructor	Consecutive wins	Span
1	(Italy) MV Agusta	8	1958–1965
2	(Japan) Suzuki	7	1976–1982
3	(Japan) **Honda**	6	1994–1999
3	(Italy) **Ducati**	6	2020–2025
5	(Italy) Gilera	4	1952–1955
6	(Japan) **Yamaha**	3	2008–2010
7	(United Kingdom) Norton	2	1950–1951

=== Most Rider championships ===
	Constructor	Riders world titles
1	(Japan) **Honda**	21
2	(Italy) MV Agusta	18
2	(Japan) **Yamaha**	18
4	(Japan) Suzuki	7
5	(Italy) Gilera	6
6	(Italy) **Ducati**	5
7	(United Kingdom) Norton	1
7	(United Kingdom) AJS	1

== Other ==
Description	Record	Details
Most wins in a season	19	(Italy) Ducati in 2024
Most podiums in a season	53	(Italy) Ducati in 2024
Most 1-2 finishes in a season	17	(Italy) Ducati in 2024
Most podium lockouts in a season	14	(Italy) Ducati in 2024
Most podiums in a row	88	(Italy) Ducati (2021 AragonGP–2025 ValencianGP)
Most front row starts in a row	98	(Italy) Ducati (2020 ValencianGP–2025 IndonesianGP)
Highest speed achieved by manufacturer	368.6 km/h (229 mph)	(Italy) Aprilia at 2026 ItalianGP
