= Johnny Lockett =

British motorcycle racer (1915–2004)

- Nationality: British
- Born: 8 December 1915
- Died: 8 December 2004 (aged 89)
Motorcycle racing career statistics
Grand Prix motorcycle racing
Active years	1949 - 1951
Team	Norton
Starts / Wins / Podiums / Poles / F. laps / Points; / 0 / 8 / 0 / 0 / 65
Isle of Man TT career
TTs contested	5 (1939, 1948-1951)
TT wins	0
TT podiums	3

Johnny Lockett (1915–2004) was a British professional Grand Prix motorcycle road racer who competed in the 1940s and 1950s. He competed in the 1949 Grand Prix motorcycle racing season riding on a 500cc Norton bike and finished seventh overall with 13 points, 17 points behind fellow British rider and teammate Harold Daniell.

== World Championship results ==
(key) (Races in bold indicate pole position; races in italics indicate fastest lap.)

Year	Class	Motorcycle	1	2	3	4	5	6	7	8	Rank	Points
1949			IOM	SUI	NED	BEL	ULS	NAT				
1949	350 cc	Norton	7		3	3					5th	14
1949	500 cc	Norton	2		5						7th	13
1950			IOM	BEL	NED	SUI	ULS	NAT				
1950	350 cc	Norton	6		4	10					9th	4
1950	500 cc	Norton	3			6	3	8			6th	9
1951			ESP	SUI	IOM	BEL	NED	FRA	ULS	NAT		
1951	350 cc	Norton			2	2		4	3		**3rd**	**19**
1951	500 cc	Norton			Ret	6	4		5		11th	6
