= Bob Foster (motorcyclist) =

British motorcycle racer

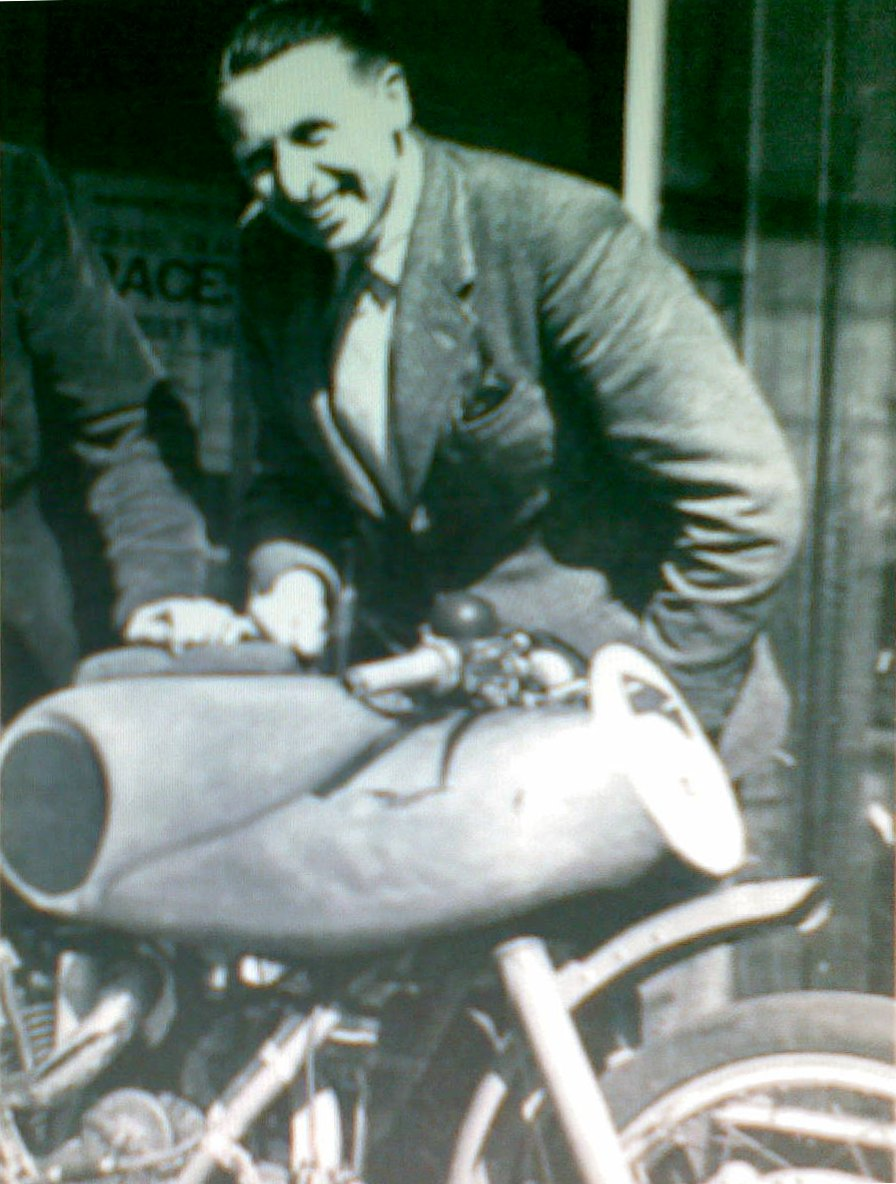
- Bob Foster
- Nationality: (United Kingdom) British
- Born: 16 March 1911; Gloucestershire, UK
- Died: 22 March 1982 (aged 71)
Motorcycle racing career statistics
Grand Prix motorcycle racing
Active years	1949–1951
First race	1949 350cc Isle of Man TT
Last race	1951 350cc Isle of Man TT
First win	1949 350cc Belgian Grand Prix
Last win	1950 350cc Ulster Grand Prix
Team	Velocette
Championships	350cc – 1950
Starts / Wins / Podiums / Poles / F. laps / Points; 8 / 3 / 6 / 0 / 4 / 47.5

Alfred Robert Foster (16 March 1911 – 22 March 1982) was a British professional motorcycle racer. He competed professionally from 1935 to 1951 and won the 1950 FIM 350cc Grand Prix world championship.

== Motorcycle racing career ==
Foster was born in Gloucestershire, UK, and became known as the Cheltenham Flyer after he began to race motorcycles in 1932. He was a versatile rider competing in diverse motorcycle competitions such as trials and motocross but, experienced his greatest success in road racing. He rode a New Imperial in the Manx Grand Prix in 1933 and 1934 with a best result being a second place in the 1934 Lightweight race. He competed in his first Isle of Man TT race riding a New Imperial in the 1935 Lightweight TT where he failed to finish.

Foster won his first Isle of Man TT race the following year riding a New Imperial in the 1936 Lightweight TT where, he exchanged the lead several times with Stanley Woods on a DKW until Woods retired on the final lap, giving Foster the victory at the then record average of 76.28 m.p.h. His victory on a unit-construction New Imperial in the 1936 Isle of Man TT marked the last time that a British-made motorcycle won a Lightweight TT. The New Imperial factory withdrew their official support from racing after the 1936 TT forcing Foster to ride an AJS 350cc R7 from 1937 to 1939. He is sponsored in the 1939 TT by Archers of Aldershot, a motorcycle shop run by the father of fellow racer Les Archer.

When motorsports activities resumed following the conclusion of the Second World War, Foster won the first post-war Isle of Man TT race to be held – the 1947 Junior – when he averaged 80.31 m.p.h. on a Velocette and finished four minutes ahead of the second-place finisher. He finished second to Freddie Frith in the 1948 Junior TT.

In the 1949 Senior TT, Foster established a post-war lap record of 25 mins. 14 secs. (89.75 m.p.h.) aboard a Moto Guzzi and, was leading the race by 57 seconds when he retired with mechanical trouble. After the T.T. he competed in the 1949 FIM Grand Prix world championships on a Velocette where, he finished second to Freddie Frith in both the Dutch TT and the Belgian Grand Prix.

Foster had his most successful season in 1950 when he battled the powerful Norton factory racing team that featured the featherbed-framed Norton Manx ridden by Artie Bell and Geoff Duke. After the Norton team started the 1950 season by claiming the top three positions at the 1950 Isle of Man TT, Foster surprised the Norton team by winning the Belgian Grand Prix ahead of Bell and Duke. He followed with victories at the Dutch TT and the Ulster Grand Prix along with a second place at the Swiss Grand Prix to clinch the 350cc world championship.

Foster retired after the 1951 Isle of Man TT and settled in Dorset where he owned garages in Blandford and Parkstone.

== Motorcycle Grand Prix results ==
1949 point system.

Position	1	2	3	4	5	Fastest lap
Points	10	8	7	6	5	1

Points system from 1950 to 1968.

Position	1	2	3	4	5	6
Points	8	6	4	3	2	1

(Races in italics indicate fastest lap)

Year	Class	Team	1	2	3	4	5	6	7	8	Points	Rank	Wins
1949	350cc	Velocette	IOM; 6	SUI -	NED; 2	BEL; 2	ULS -				16.5	3rd	0
1949	500cc	Moto Guzzi	IOM; NC	SUI -	NED -	BEL -	ULS -	NAT -			0	-	0
1950	350cc	Velocette	IOM; NC	BEL; 1	NED; 1	SUI; 2	ULS; 1	NAT -			30	1st	3
1950	500cc	Moto Guzzi	IOM; NC								0	-	0
1950	500cc	AJS		BEL; 7	NED -	SUI -	ULS -	NAT; 15			0	-	0
1951	250cc	Velocette		SUI -	IOM; NC			FRA -	ULS -	NAT -	0	-	0
1951	350cc	Velocette	ESP -	SUI -	IOM; 6	BEL -	NED -	FRA -	ULS -	NAT -	1	16th	0
