= Ted Frend =

British motorcycle racer

Edward Frend (3 November 1916 – 6 September 2006), born in South London, was a British motorcycle sports competitor from the late 1930s to the early 1950s, road racing with the AJS works team from 1948 to 1954.

== Early years ==
In 1932, employed as an apprentice sheet-metal worker at Hawker Aircraft, he bought his first motorcycle, a 250 cc Dunelt. On completion of his apprenticeship in 1936, he found employment with General Aircraft in Feltham, and bought a 350 cc Ariel Red Hunter motorcycle for competition. Soon after attending the 1936 Olympia motorcycle show, he part exchanged his Ariel Square Four for the just released new Vincent 1000 cc V Twin Rapide for £138 to use on the roads. In 1937, he joined the Streatham & District MCC, and competed in trials. (He later became the Club President.)

In 1938, Frend competed in the South Eastern Centre Championship meeting Unlimited class, and might have won if his exhaust had not fallen off.

In 1939, Frend lapped Brooklands' outer circuit at 110 mph on his 1937 Vincent HRD Rapide winning the three lap race and earning the acclaimed Brooklands GoldStar for lapping over the ton. He also joined the British Motorcycle Racing Club.

== World War II ==
During World War II, Frend was in a reserved occupation, an engineer manufacturing aircraft parts.

== Post War competition ==
In 1947, Frend came fourth in the 1947 Isle of Man TT, and AMC offered Frend a place in the 1948 AJS works team. He proved an all-rounder, not just competing in road racing, but also in grass track, hill climbs, trials, and scrambles. His business, Paramount Sheet Metal, in Kingston providing aircraft and motor cycle parts was more important to him than racing, and when it grew, demanding more of his time, he cut back on racing.

Frend came eighth in the Junior on an AJS 350 at the 1949 Isle of Man TT, and came fifth in the Junior, and fifteenth in the Senior at the 1950 Isle of Man TT. In the 1953 Isle of Man TT he rode a Norton to seventh.

In 1954, Frend rode his last TT. He continued to ride motorcycles after, in the end riding a Honda 550 until he no longer could.

Frend was a member of the Brooklands Society, president of the Streatham & District Motor-Cycle Club, and a member of West Byfleet Golf Club.
