= 1949 Isle of Man TT =

Annual motorcycle racing event

(United Kingdom) 1949 Isle of Man TT
Race details
- Race 1 of 6 races in the 1949 Grand Prix motorcycle racing season
- Date: 6–17 June 1949
- Official name: International Isle of Man Tourist Trophy
- Location: Snaefell Mountain Course
- Course: Public roads; 60.72 km (37.73 mi)

500cc
- Rider
Fastest lap
Rider	(United Kingdom) Bob Foster	Moto Guzzi
Time	25m 14s	
Podium
First	(United Kingdom) Harold Daniell	Norton
Second	(United Kingdom) Johnny Lockett	Norton
Third	(Republic of Ireland) Ernie Lyons	Velocette

350cc
- Rider
Fastest lap
Rider	(United Kingdom) Freddie Frith	Velocette
Time	26m 53s	
Podium
First	(United Kingdom) Freddie Frith	Velocette
Second	(Republic of Ireland) Ernie Lyons	Velocette
Third	(United Kingdom) Artie Bell	Norton

250cc
- Rider
Fastest lap
Rider	(United Kingdom) Tommy Wood (United Kingdom) Dickie Dale	Moto Guzzi; Moto Guzzi
Time	28m 09s	
Podium
First	(Republic of Ireland) Manliff Barrington	Moto Guzzi
Second	(United Kingdom) Tommy Wood	Moto Guzzi
Third	(United Kingdom) Roland Pike	Rudge

The 1949 Isle of Man Tourist Trophy was the first round of the Grand Prix World Championship that was held in the Isle of Man.

At the FICM (later known as FIM) meeting in London near the end of 1948, it was decided there would be a motorcycle World Championship along Grand Prix lines. It would be a six-race annual series with points being awarded for a placing and a point for the fastest lap of each race. There would be five classes: 500 cc, 350 cc, 250 cc, 125 cc and 600 cc sidecar. The historic Isle of Man TT would be one of those races, and this toughest and most dangerous of Grand Prix motorcycle races would be a mainstay on the GP calendar until 1976.

Harold Daniell, on a Norton, won the 500 cc Senior TT event at an average speed of 86.93 mph. Les Graham, on an AJS Porcupine 500 cc twin, led the Senior race until the last lap when his magneto drive sheared. He pushed the bike past the finish line in tenth place. As he had finished the race he gained one championship point for recording the fastest lap.

Four clubman races were included; the Clubmans Senior, Clubmans Junior, Clubmans Lightweight, and the new Clubmans 1,000 cc.

British 350 cc rider Ben Drinkwater was killed in the Junior TT race at the 11th Milestone.

== Race results ==
=== Junior TT (350cc) ===
Place	Rider	Number	Machine	Speed	Time	Points
1	(United Kingdom) Freddie Frith		Velocette	83.15 mph	3:10:26.0	10
2	(Republic of Ireland) Ernie Lyons		Velocette	82.92 mph	3:11:08.0	8
3	(United Kingdom) Artie Bell		Norton	82.62 mph	3:11:49.0	7
4	(United Kingdom) Harold Daniell		Norton	82.59 mph	3:11:52.2	6
5	(Republic of Ireland) Reg Armstrong		AJS	82.34 mph	3:12:28.0	5

Fastest Lap and New Lap Record: Freddie Frith Velocette – 84.23 mph; 26 minutes 52.71 seconds (1 championship point for fastest lap).

=== Lightweight TT (250cc) ===
Place	Rider	Number	Machine	Speed	Time	Points
1	(Republic of Ireland) Manliff Barrington		Moto Guzzi	77.99 mph	3:23.13.2	10
2	(United Kingdom) Tommy Wood		Moto Guzzi	77.91 mph	3:23.25.8	8
3	(United Kingdom) Roland Pike		Rudge	72.79 mph	3:37.42.6	7
4	(United Kingdom) Ronald Mead		Mead-Norton	72.68 mph	3:41.06.6	6
5	(Denmark) Svend Aage Sørensen		Excelsior	71.00 mph	3:43.12.0	5

Fastest Lap and New Lap Record: Dickie Dale – Moto Guzzi – 80.43 mph; 28 minutes 8.9 seconds.

=== 1949 Isle of Man Senior TT (500cc) ===
7 Laps (264.25 Miles) Mountain Course.

Place	Rider	Number	Machine	Speed	Time	Points
1	(United Kingdom) Harold L Daniell	14	Norton	86.93 mph	3:02:18.6	10
2	(United Kingdom) Johnny Lockett	42	Norton	86.19 mph	3:03:52.4	8
3	(Republic of Ireland) Ernie Lyons		Velocette	85.50 mph	3:05:22.0	7
4	(United Kingdom) Artie Bell	1	Norton	83.83 mph	3:09:03.0	6
5	(New Zealand) Syd Jensen		Triumph	83.17 mph	3:10:33.0	5

Fastest Lap and New Lap Record: Bob Foster Moto Guzzi – 89.75 mph (25 minutes 14 seconds) on lap 2. Retired lap 5 at Sulby with failed clutch.

== Non-championship races ==
=== Clubmans 1000 cc classification ===
Pos	Rider	Manufacturer	Time
1	Dennis Lashmar	Vincent	1:29:01.8
2	James Wright	Vincent	+4:25.8
3	Pat Wilson	Vincent	+5:04.8
4	Charlie Howkins	Ariel	+14:31.6
5	George Brown	Vincent	+47:43.2
Ret	Chris Horn	Vincent	
Ret	Alex Phillip	Vincent	
Ret	Jack Harding	Vincent	
Ret	Geoff Manning	Vincent	
Ret	Jack Netherton	Vincent	

=== Clubmans Senior TT classification ===
Pos	Rider	Manufacturer	Time
1	Geoff Duke	Norton	1:21:53.0
2	Allan Jefferies	Triumph	+2:11.0
3	Leo Starr	Triumph	+7:20.2
4	Phil Carter	Norton	+7:50.2
5	Tom Crebbin	Triumph	+7:53.2
6	Edwin Andrew	Norton	+8:42.0
7	Jack Carr	Vincent-HRD	+9:08.4
8	Robin Sherry	Triumph	+9:12.0
9	A. Johnstone	Triumph	+9:39.2
10	David Wilkins	Triumph	+12:33.4
31 finishers

=== Clubmans Junior TT classification ===
Pos	Rider	Manufacturer	Time
1	Harold Clark	BSA	1:30:21.6
2	John Simister	Norton	+49.4
3	Alan Taylor	Norton	+1:03.0
4	Ray Hallet	BSA	+1:30.0
5	Cecil Sandford	Velocette	+2:01.8
6	Ted Pink	Norton	+2:11.2
7	Fred Collins	Velocette	+2:38.8
8	Walter Reed	Norton	+2:56.0
9	Arthur Brassington	Norton	+4:14.0
10	R. D. Briscoe	Norton	+4:33.8
57 finishers

=== Clubmans Lightweight TT classification ===
Pos	Rider	Manufacturer	Time
1	Cyril Taft	Excelsior	1:06:30.2
2	Dennis Ritchie	Velocette	+40.0
3	Bernard Hargreaves	Velocette	+1:15.0
4	George Wakefield	Triumph	+4:00.6
5	Len Bolshaw	Triumph	+4:02.4
6	Arthur Barton	Triumph	+4:59.4
7	Frank Cope	Excelsior	+5:40.8
8	Jack McVeigh	Triumph	+6:35.6
9	George Northwood	Velocette	+7:36.8
10	John Dulson	Velocette	+9:12.6
13 finishers

Previous race: None	FIM Grand Prix World Championship; 1949 season	Next race: 1949 Swiss Grand Prix
Previous race: 1948 Isle of Man TT	Isle of Man TT	Next race: 1950 Isle of Man TT
