= 1949 Grand Prix motorcycle racing season =

Sports season

1949 F.I.M. Grand Prix motorcycle racing season

Seasons
- 1950 →

The 1949 Grand Prix motorcycle racing season was the inaugural F.I.M. Road Racing World Championship Grand Prix season. The season consisted of six Grand Prix races in five classes: 500cc, 350cc, 250cc, 125cc and Sidecars 600cc. It began on 17 June, with Isle of Man TT and ended with Nations Grand Prix on 4 September.

== 1949 Grand Prix season calendar ==
Round	Date	Grand Prix	Circuit	125cc winner	250cc winner	350cc winner	500cc winner	Sidecars 600cc winner	Report
1	17 June	Isle of Man TT	Snaefell Mountain		(Republic of Ireland) Manliff Barrington	(United Kingdom) Freddie Frith	(United Kingdom) Harold Daniell		Report
2	3 July	(Switzerland) Swiss Grand Prix	Bremgarten	(Italy) Nello Pagani	(Italy) Bruno Ruffo	(United Kingdom) Freddie Frith	(United Kingdom) Leslie Graham	(United Kingdom) Oliver / Jenkinson	Report
3	9 July	(Netherlands) Dutch TT	Assen	(Italy) Nello Pagani		(United Kingdom) Freddie Frith	(Italy) Nello Pagani		Report
4	17 July	(Belgium) Belgian Grand Prix	Spa-Francorchamps			(United Kingdom) Freddie Frith	(United Kingdom) Bill Doran	(United Kingdom) Oliver / Jenkinson	Report
5	20 August	Ulster Grand Prix	Clady		(United Kingdom) Maurice Cann	(United Kingdom) Freddie Frith	(United Kingdom) Leslie Graham		Report
6	4 September	(Italy) Nations Grand Prix	Monza	(Italy) Gianni Leoni	(Italy) Dario Ambrosini		(Italy) Nello Pagani	(Italy) Frigerio / Dobelli	Report

== Standings ==
=== Scoring system ===
Points were awarded to the top five finishers in each race with an extra point for the race finisher with the fastest lap. All rounds counted towards the championship in the 125cc, 250cc and Sidecar categories, while in the 350cc and 500cc championships, only the best three results counted.

Position	1st	2nd	3rd	4th	5th	Fastest lap
Points	10	8	7	6	5	1

==== 500cc final standings ====
Pos	Rider	Machine	MAN (Isle of Man)	SUI (Switzerland)	NED (Netherlands)	BEL (Belgium)	ULS (Ulster)	NAT (Italy)	Pts
1	(United Kingdom) Leslie Graham	AJS	10	1	2	Ret	1	Ret	**30** (31)
2	(Italy) Nello Pagani	Gilera		4	1	5	3	1	**29** (40)
3	(Italy) Arciso Artesiani	Gilera		2	3	2	Ret	2	**25** (32)
4	(United Kingdom) Bill Doran	AJS	8		Ret	1	4	3	**23**
5	(United Kingdom) Artie Bell	Norton	**4**	Ret	4	4	2		**20** (26)
6	(United Kingdom) Harold Daniell	Norton	1	3	6	7			**17**
7	(United Kingdom) Johnny Lockett	Norton	2	Ret	5	Ret	Ret		**13**
8	(Italy) Enrico Lorenzetti	Moto Guzzi			10	3			**7**
9	(Republic of Ireland) Ernie Lyons	Velocette	3						**7**
10	(Italy) Gianni Leoni	Moto Guzzi		6	Ret	6		4	**6**
11	(New Zealand) Syd Jensen	Triumph	5		Ret	9			**5**
12	(United Kingdom) Freddie Frith	Velocette	Ret	5	Ret	Ret			**5**
13	(Italy) Bruno Bertacchini	Moto Guzzi		Ret			Ret	5	**5**
14	(United Kingdom) Jock West	AJS					5		**5**
15	(United Kingdom) Ken Armstrong	AJS						6	**0**
=	(United Kingdom) Cromie McCandless	Norton					6		**0**
=	(United Kingdom) Fred Stevens	Triumph	6						**0**
18	(United Kingdom) Ken Bills	Velocette		7	Ret	10			**0**
19	(United Kingdom) Harry Turner	Norton	18				7		**0**
20	(Italy) Umberto Masetti	Gilera			7	Ret			**0**
21	(Republic of Ireland) Reg Armstrong	AJS	7						**0**
=	(Italy) Felice Benasedo	Moto Guzzi						7	**0**
23	(Australia) Harry Hinton	Norton	9		8	16			**0**
24	(Australia) George Morrison	Norton	31		Ret	8	Ret		**0**
25	(Switzerland) Roger Richoz	Norton		8					**0**
=	(Italy) Ricardo Sabbadini	Moto Guzzi						8	**0**
=	(Republic of Ireland) James Scott	Triumph					8		**0**
28	(Italy) Oscar Clemencich	Gilera			9	Ret		15	**0**
29	(Italy) Sante Geminiani	Moto Guzzi						9	**0**
=	(Switzerland) Hans Kaufmann	Gilera		9					**0**
31	(Italy) Dante Bianchi	Moto Guzzi						10	**0**
=	(Switzerland) Georges Cordey	Norton		10					**0**
=	(Republic of Ireland) Ernie Callahan	Triumph					10		**0**
34	(United Kingdom) Arthur Wheeler	Triumph	Ret		Ret	11			**0**
35	(United Kingdom) Phil Heath	Norton	11			Ret			**0**
36	(Italy) Adelmo Mandolini	Moto Guzzi						11	**0**
=	(Switzerland) Benoit Musy	Moto Guzzi		11					**0**
=	(Netherlands) Drikus Veer	Triumph			11				**0**
38	(United Kingdom) Oliver Scott	Norton	Ret		12	15			**0**
39	(United Kingdom) Bill Beevers	Norton	16	12	Ret	Ret	Ret		**0**
40	(Italy) Antonio Dalle Fusine	Gilera				12	Ret		**0**
=	(United Kingdom) Bill Petch	Triumph	12			Ret			**0**
42	(Italy) Lodovico Facchinelli	Gilera						12	**0**
43	(United Kingdom) Edward Nicholls	Triumph			13		9		**0**
44	(United Kingdom) Guy Newman	Norton	13						**0**
=	(Hungary) Nandor Puhony	Gilera		13					**0**
=	(Italy) Orlando Valdinoci	Gilera						13	**0**
=	(Belgium) Albert Vertriest	Triumph				13			**0**
48	(Italy) Alfeo Maramotti	Moto Guzzi						14	**0**
=	(Australia) Eric McPherson	AJS	14						**0**
=	(Netherlands) Jacques Schot	Norton			14				**0**
=	(Hungary) László Szabó	Gilera		14					**0**
=	(Belgium) Jules Tacheny	Triumph				14			**0**
53	(United Kingdom) Roy Evans	Norton	15						**0**
=	(Netherlands) Gerard Hoek	BMW			15				**0**
55	(United Kingdom) Jack Bailey	Triumph	17				Ret		**0**
56	(United Kingdom) Johnny Hodgkin	Norton	19						**0**
57	(United Kingdom) Dick Addie	Norton	20						**0**
58	(United Kingdom) Albert Moule	Triumph	21						**0**
59	(United Kingdom) George Paterson	Triumph	22						**0**
60	(United Kingdom) Bob Matthews	Norton	23						**0**
61	(United Kingdom) George Hayden	Norton	24						**0**
62	(United Kingdom) John Purnell	Norton	25						**0**
63	(United Kingdom) Lesly Hill	Norton	26						**0**
64	(United Kingdom) Arthur Fenn	Norton	27						**0**
65	(United Kingdom) Harry Francis	Norton	28						**0**
66	(United Kingdom) Eric Hardy	Norton	29						**0**
67	(United Kingdom) Jack Brett	Norton	30						**0**
68	(United Kingdom) Lennart Fenning	Norton	32						**0**
69	(United Kingdom) Rob Weston	Norton	33						**0**
70	(United Kingdom) Joe Glazebrook	Triumph	34						**0**
71	(United Kingdom) Joe Dent	Norton	35						**0**
-	(United Kingdom) Bob Foster	Moto Guzzi	Ret		Ret	Ret	Ret		**0**
-	(Italy) Carlo Bandirola	Gilera		Ret			Ret	Ret	**0**
-	(United Kingdom) Eric Briggs	Norton	Ret		Ret	Ret			**0**
-	(United Kingdom) Les Dear	Norton	Ret		Ret	Ret			**0**
-	(United Kingdom) Ted Frend	AJS	Ret	Ret	Ret				**0**
-	(United Kingdom) Fergus Anderson	Moto Guzzi		Ret		Ret			**0**
-	(Republic of Ireland) Wilf Billington	Norton	Ret				Ret		**0**
-	(United Kingdom) Norman Croft	Triumph	Ret	Ret					**0**
-	(United Kingdom) Frank Fry	Norton			Ret	Ret			**0**
-	(United Kingdom) Eric Oliver	Norton	Ret					Ret	**0**
-	(United Kingdom) Ernie Thomas	Triumph		Ret				Ret	**0**
-	(United Kingdom) David Whitworth	Triumph			Ret	Ret			**0**
-	(Italy) Dario Ambrosini	Gilera		Ret					**0**
-	(United Kingdom) Syl Anderton	Triumph	Ret						**0**
-	(United Kingdom) Syd Barnett	Norton	Ret						**0**
-	(France) Jean Behra	Moto Guzzi		Ret					**0**
-	(Italy) Aldo Bernardoni	Gilera						Ret	**0**
-	(United Kingdom) Ernie Braine	Norton	Ret						**0**
-	(United Kingdom) Charlie Brett	Velocette	Ret						**0**
-	(Italy) Aldo Brini	Gilera						Ret	**0**
-	(Republic of Ireland) Gerard Carter	Norton					Ret		**0**
-	(Spain) Javier de Ortueta	Norton	Ret						**0**
-	(Belgium) Roland Dumond	Moto Guzzi					Ret		**0**
-	(Czech Republic) Juhan Franta	Moto Guzzi		Ret					**0**
-	(Belgium) Auguste Goffin	Triumph				Ret			**0**
-	(United Kingdom) Arthur Good	Norton	Ret						**0**
-	(Switzerland) Hans Haldemann	Moto Guzzi				Ret			**0**
-	(Netherlands) Piet Knijnenburg	BMW			Ret				**0**
-	(Belgium) Roger Laurent	Moto Guzzi				Ret			**0**
-	(United Kingdom) Sid Lawton	Triumph	Ret						**0**
-	(United Kingdom) Reg Lee	Norton	Ret						**0**
-	(Belgium) Leon Martin	Gilera				Ret			**0**
-	(Republic of Ireland) Reginald MacDonald	Triumph					Ret		**0**
-	(Isle of Man) Tommy McEwans	Triumph	Ret						**0**
-	(Italy) Armando Miele	Gilera						Ret	**0**
-	(United Kingdom) Stan Miller	Norton	Ret						**0**
-	(United Kingdom) Bert Myers	Triumph	Ret						**0**
-	(United Kingdom) Billy Graham	Norton					Ret		**0**
-	(United Kingdom) Ashley Len Parry	Norton					Ret		**0**
-	(Netherlands) Hub Pellikaan	BMW			Ret				**0**
-	(United Kingdom) Henry Pinnington	Norton	Ret						**0**
-	(United Kingdom) Charlie Salt	Norton	Ret						**0**
-	(Italy) Emilio Soprani	Gilera						Ret	**0**
-	(Netherlands) Jan Veer	Triumph			Ret				**0**
-	(United Kingdom) Roy Walker	Norton	Ret						**0**
-	(United Kingdom) Tom Wycherley	Norton					Ret		**0**
Pos	Rider	Bike	MAN (Isle of Man)	SUI (Switzerland)	NED (Netherlands)	BEL (Belgium)	ULS (Ulster)	NAT (Italy)	Pts

Colour	Result
Gold	Winner
Silver	Second place
Bronze	Third place
Green	Points classification
Blue	Non-points classification
Blue	Non-classified finish (NC)
Purple	Retired, not classified (Ret)
Red	Did not qualify (DNQ)
Red	Did not pre-qualify (DNPQ)
Black	Disqualified (DSQ)
White	Did not start (DNS)
White	Withdrew (WD)
White	Race cancelled (C)
Blank	Did not practice (DNP)
Blank	Did not arrive (DNA)
Blank	Excluded (EX)

**Bold** – Pole
Italics – Fastest Lap

==== Constructors' 500cc World Championship ====
Pos	Constructor	(Isle of Man)	(Switzerland)	(Netherlands)	(Belgium)	(Ulster)	(Italy)	Pts
1	(United Kingdom) AJS	6	1	2	1	1	3	**32** (48)
2	(Italy) Gilera	–	2	1	2	3	1	**31** (46)
3	(United Kingdom) Norton	1	3	4	4	2	Ret	**25** (37)
4	(Italy) Moto Guzzi	Ret	6	10	3	Ret	4	**13**
5	(United Kingdom) Velocette	3	5	Ret	10	–	–	**12**
6	(United Kingdom) Triumph	5	Ret	11	9	8	Ret	**5**
–	(Germany) BMW	–	–	15	–	–	–	**0**

==== 350cc final standings ====
Place	Rider	Number	Country	Machine	Points	Wins
1	(United Kingdom) Freddie Frith		United Kingdom	Velocette	33	5
2	(Republic of Ireland) Reg Armstrong		Ireland	AJS	18	0
3	(United Kingdom) Bob Foster		United Kingdom	Velocette	16	0
4	(Australia) Eric McPherson		Australia	AJS	16	0
5	(United Kingdom) Johnny Lockett		United Kingdom	Norton	14	0
6	(United Kingdom) David Whitworth		United Kingdom	Velocette	12	0
7	(United Kingdom) Leslie Graham		United Kingdom	AJS	8	0
8	(Republic of Ireland) Ernie Lyons		Ireland	Velocette	8	0
9	(United Kingdom) Charlie Salt		United Kingdom	Velocette	8	0
10	(United Kingdom) Bill Doran		United Kingdom	AJS	7	0

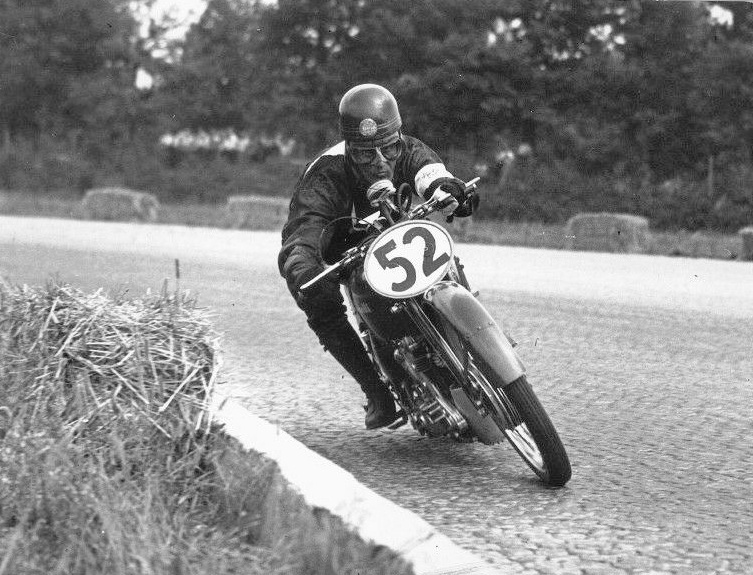
250cc runner-up Dario Ambrosini.

==== 250cc final standings ====
Place	Rider	Number	Country	Machine	Points	Wins
1	(Italy) Bruno Ruffo		Italy	Moto Guzzi	24	1
2	(Italy) Dario Ambrosini		Italy	Benelli	19	1
3	(United Kingdom) Ronald Mead		United Kingdom	Norton	13	0
4	(United Kingdom) Maurice Cann		United Kingdom	Moto Guzzi	11	1
5	(Italy) Claudio Mastellari		Italy	Moto Guzzi	11	0
6	(Republic of Ireland) Manliff Barrington		Ireland	Moto Guzzi	10	1
7	(United Kingdom) Tommy Wood		United Kingdom	Moto Guzzi	9	0
8	(United Kingdom) Fergus Anderson		United Kingdom	Moto Guzzi	8	0
9	(Italy) Gianni Leoni		Italy	Moto Guzzi	8	0
10	(Italy) Umberto Masetti		Italy	Benelli	7	0

=== 125cc ===
==== Riders' standings ====
Pos.	Rider	Bike	SUI (Switzerland)	NED (Netherlands)	NAT (Italy)	Pts
1	(Italy) Nello Pagani	Mondial	1**^{F}**	1**^{F}**	5	27
2	(Italy) Renato Magi	Morini	2		4	14
3	(Italy) Umberto Masetti	Morini	5	DSQ	2	13
4	(Italy) Carlo Ubbiali	MV Agusta	4	3		13
5	(Italy) Gianni Leoni	Mondial			1**^{F}**	11
6	(Italy) Oscar Clemencich	Mondial		2		8
7	(Italy) Umberto Braga	Mondial			3	7
7	(Italy) Celeste Cavaciuti	Mondial	3			7
9	(Italy) Franco Bertoni	MV Agusta		4		6
10	(Italy) Giuseppe Matucci	MV Agusta		5		5
Pos.	Rider	Bike	SUI (Switzerland)	NED (Netherlands)	NAT (Italy)	Pts

Race key
Colour	Result
Gold	Winner
Silver	2nd place
Bronze	3rd place
Green	Points finish
Blue	Non-points finish
Blue	Non-classified finish (NC)
Purple	Retired (Ret)
Red	Did not qualify (DNQ)
Black	Disqualified (DSQ)
White	Did not start (DNS)
White	Withdrew (WD)
White	Race cancelled (C)
Blank	Did not practice (DNP)
Blank	Excluded (EX)
Blank	Did not arrive (DNA)
Blank	Did not enter (empty cell)
Annotation	Meaning
P	Pole position
F	Fastest lap
Rider key
Colour	Meaning
Light blue	Rookie rider

==== Constructors' standings ====
Each constructor is awarded the same number of points as their best placed rider in each race.

Pos.	Constructor	SUI (Switzerland)	NED (Netherlands)	NAT (Italy)	Pts
1	(Italy) Mondial	1**^{F}**	1**^{F}**	1**^{F}**	33
2	(Italy) Morini	2		2	16
3	(Italy) MV Agusta	4	3		13
Pos.	Constructor	SUI (Switzerland)	NED (Netherlands)	NAT (Italy)	Pts

==== Sidecar final standings ====
Place	Rider	Number	Country	Machine	Points	Wins
1	(United Kingdom) Eric Oliver / Denis Jenkinson		UK	Norton	27	2
2	(Italy) Ercole Frigerio / Lorenzo Dobelli		Italy	Gilera	18	1
3	(Belgium) Frans Vanderschrick / Martin Whitney		United Kingdom	Norton	16	0
4	(Italy) Ernesto Merlo / Aldo Veglio		Italy	Gilera	13	0
5	(Italy) Albino Milani / Ezio Ricotti		Italy	Gilera	12	1
6	(Switzerland) Hans Haldemann / Herbert Läderach		Switzerland	Norton	8	0
7	(Switzerland) Roland Benz / Max Hirzel		Switzerland	BMW	6	0
8	(Switzerland) Jakob Keller / Ernst Brutschi		Switzerland	Gilera	6	0
9	(United Kingdom) Pip Harris / Neil Smith		United Kingdom	Norton	5	0
