= List of Velocette motorcycles =

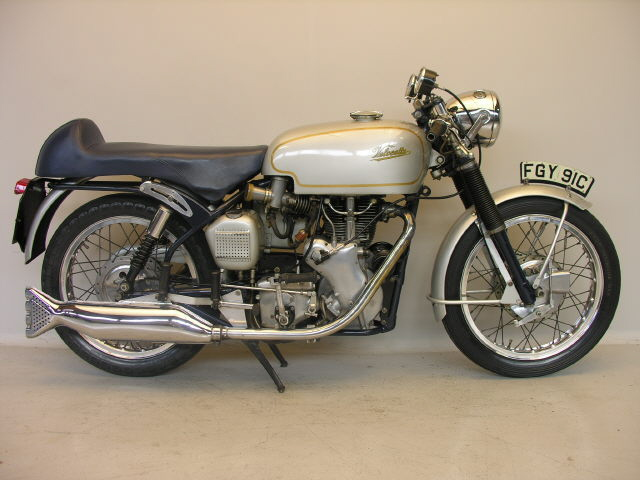
1965 Velocette Thruxton

The following is a list of motorcycles manufactured by Velocette, which ran from 1904 to 1971.

== Motorcycles ==
Model	Engine	Years	Notes
2 H.P. Veloce		1907
2½ H.P	276 cc	1909	four-stroke unit construction
Model D1	220 cc	1919	Two-stroke
Model DL1	220 cc	1919	Two-stroke 'ladies model'
Model D2	220 cc	1919	Two-stroke with gear control lever
Model DL2	220 cc	1919	Two-stroke 'ladies model'
Model D3		1921	3-speed gearbox, and chain drive
Sports Model	249 cc	1922	Racing motorcycle
Model G	249 cc	1923	Electric lighting (Maglita)
Model GC	249 cc	1923	C stands for "Colonial"
Model A	249 cc	1924	2 two-speed belt drive
Model B	249 cc	1923	3-speed chain-drive economy model
Model H	348 cc	1925
Model E		1925	Ladies model
Model AC		1925	Chain drive
Model K		1925	First Velocette
Velocette KSS	348 cc	1925–1948	Super Sports OHC single
Model U	249 cc	1928
Velocette KTT	348 cc	1925–1938	TT replica of the KSS with the first positive-stop foot gearchange on a motorcycle.
Model KS		1927	KSS with a standard engine
Model KE		1928	Economy model
Model KES		1928	Economy model
Model USS		1929	Super sports version of the Model U
GTP	249 cc	1930	2-stroke engine with coil ignition
MOV	248 cc	1933	High camshaft 4-stroke
Velocette MAC	349 cc	1933	OHV air-cooled single
Velocette MSS	495 cc	1935	OHV air-cooled single
MAC (WD)	349 cc	1940	Military version of MAC
MAF	349 cc	1941	Improved version of MAC (WD)
Velocette LE	149 cc	1951	Telescopic front fork
Velocette Venom	499 cc	1956	Sports model
Velocette Viper	349 cc	1956
Velocette Valiant	200 cc	1956	Flat twin
Valiant Veeline	200 cc	1959	Flat twin
Viceroy	249 cc	1960	2-stroke scooter
Velocette Voletta	192 cc	1961
Vogue	192 cc	1963	LE with a streamlined glass-fibre bodywork
Velocette Thruxton	499 cc	1965–1971

== See also ==
- List of AMC motorcycles*
- List of Ariel motorcycles
- List of BSA motorcycles
- List of Royal Enfield motorcycles
- List of Triumph motorcycles
- List of Vincent motorcycles
