= Velocette MAC =

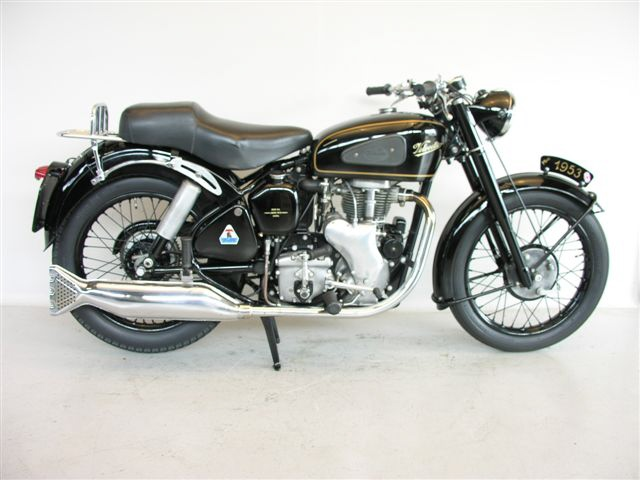
- Manufacturer: Velocette
- Production: 1946–59
- Predecessor: Velocette MOV
- Successor: Velocette MSS
- Engine: 349 cc (21.3 cu in), OHV air-cooled single
- Bore / stroke: 68.5mm x 96mm
- Transmission: Four-speed chain final drive
- Brakes: Front: 7-inch sls drum Rear: 6-inch sls drum
- Tires: Front: 3.25 x 19; Rear: 3.50 x 19
- Wheelbase: 50.25 in (1,276 mm)
- Seat height: 27.5 in (700 mm)
- Fuel capacity: 2.5 imp gal (11 L; 3.0 US gal)

The Velocette MAC is a British motorcycle made by Velocette. A reliable single-cylinder, the MAC coped well with the low-grade post war petrol and was a popular commuter and touring motorcycle. Although they started as innovators, Velocette failed to keep pace with developing technology and production ended in 1959.

== Before World War II ==
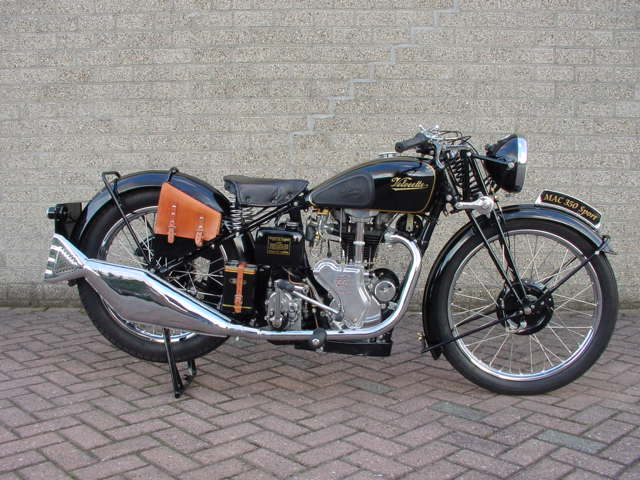
1936 Velocette MAC Sport

The first version of the Velocette MAC was launched in 1933 and was developed from the overhead valve Velocette MOV 250cc, which suffered from reliability problems. The single-cylinder engine was enlarged to 349 cc and could comfortably reach 75 mph (121 km/h). The early MAC weighed 280 lb (130 kg) and had girder front forks.

== Wartime models ==
=== MAC (WD) ===
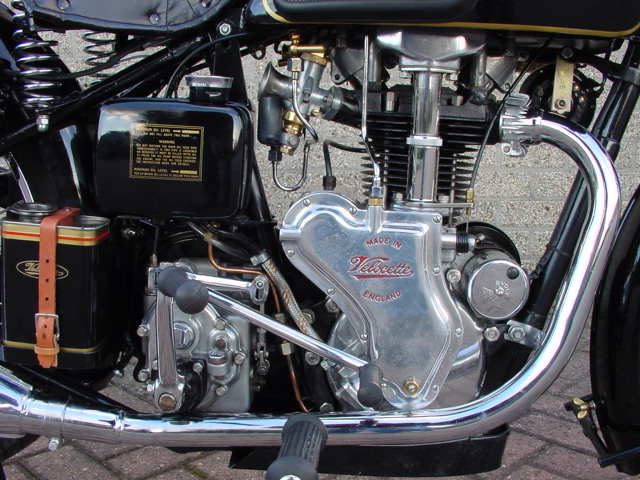
Velocette MAC engine

In October 1939 a Velocette MAC was purchased by the British War Office Army Mechanisation Experimental Establishment (MEE) at Cove in Hampshire for testing its suitability for military use. As well as British observers there were also representatives of the French Army present. The tests were successful but a number of modifications were suggested and in 1940 the Velocette MAC was modified into a military specification. Velocette's first order for the military version was from the French Government but the contract for 1,200 motorcycles was cancelled after the French capitulation. Only one was delivered before the French were overrun by the advancing German Army. The British War Department asked for some further modifications and took over the French order in June 1940. The Velocette was designated the MAC (WD), the WD coming from "War Department", although it was often referred to as the MDD as this was the prefix for the serial numbers.

The MAC (WD) had an upgraded clutch and the pressed-steel front brake drum was replaced by cast iron fittings which became standard for the later MAC models, due to the shortage of aluminium which was needed for aircraft manufacture. Other modifications included a protective shield bolted to the frame over the crankcase. A strong carrying rack replaced the rear pillion seat and the headlamp was masked to comply with blackout regulations.

The MDD could cope well with battlefield conditions, but Velocette's limited production facilities meant it was a difficult to keep up production and by September 1942 the MDD order was cancelled and the factory turned over to other War work. As there were a fairly small number in service both the Velocette MAC (WD) and the improved MAF were largely used by British-based forces, including the Fire Service and Civil Defence organisations, as well as the Royal Air Force.

==== The 'missing' WDs ====
A myth persists that a large consignment of Velocette MAC (WD) intended for use in France was lost in the English Channel while being delivered. An order for 200 MAC (WD)'s was placed in July 1940 for delivery to the Central Ordnance Department at Chilwell but the order was never fulfilled, probably due to lack of capacity at the Velocette factory.

When MAC (WD)'s were returned to civilian use after the war they often had the MDD engine and serial numbers ground off and replaced with later numbers, reinforcing the idea that they had been mysteriously lost without trace.

=== MAF ===
The Velocette MAF had the foot gear change mechanism reversed to make it the same as the other military motorcycles in use at the time. An order for 2,000 was placed in June 1941 but problems with Velocette's supplies and the limited production facilities meant that it was a difficult order to fulfil. By September 1942 they had only delivered 947 motorcycles and the order was cancelled.

== Post war ==
MAC production restarted after the war. In 1948 the MAC's girder forks were replaced with innovative air-sprung Dowty Oleomatic forks. In 1951 these were upgraded to Veloce 'tele forks' which were developed for the Velocette LE. These had coil springs with damping. In the same year the engine was upgraded to an alloy barrel and head with wider fins to improve cooling. For 1953 the MAC was updated with fully adjustable rear suspension, swinging arm and a tube frame. The clutch and gearbox were also greatly improved. The exhaust muffler was also changed for that year's MAC model from the typical "Fishtail" style to a "Burgess" style. From 1954, the MAC was sold as a sidecar machine to try to broaden the appeal but production was halted by 1960. The company had invested £50,000 developing the Velocette Viceroy scooter and, despite continued sales of the singles, Velocette became insolvent.

== See also ==
- Matchless G3/L – similar engine size British military motorcycle by Matchless
- Ariel W/NG 350 – similar engine size British military motorcycle by Ariel
