= Velocette Valiant =

British motorcycle made by Velocette

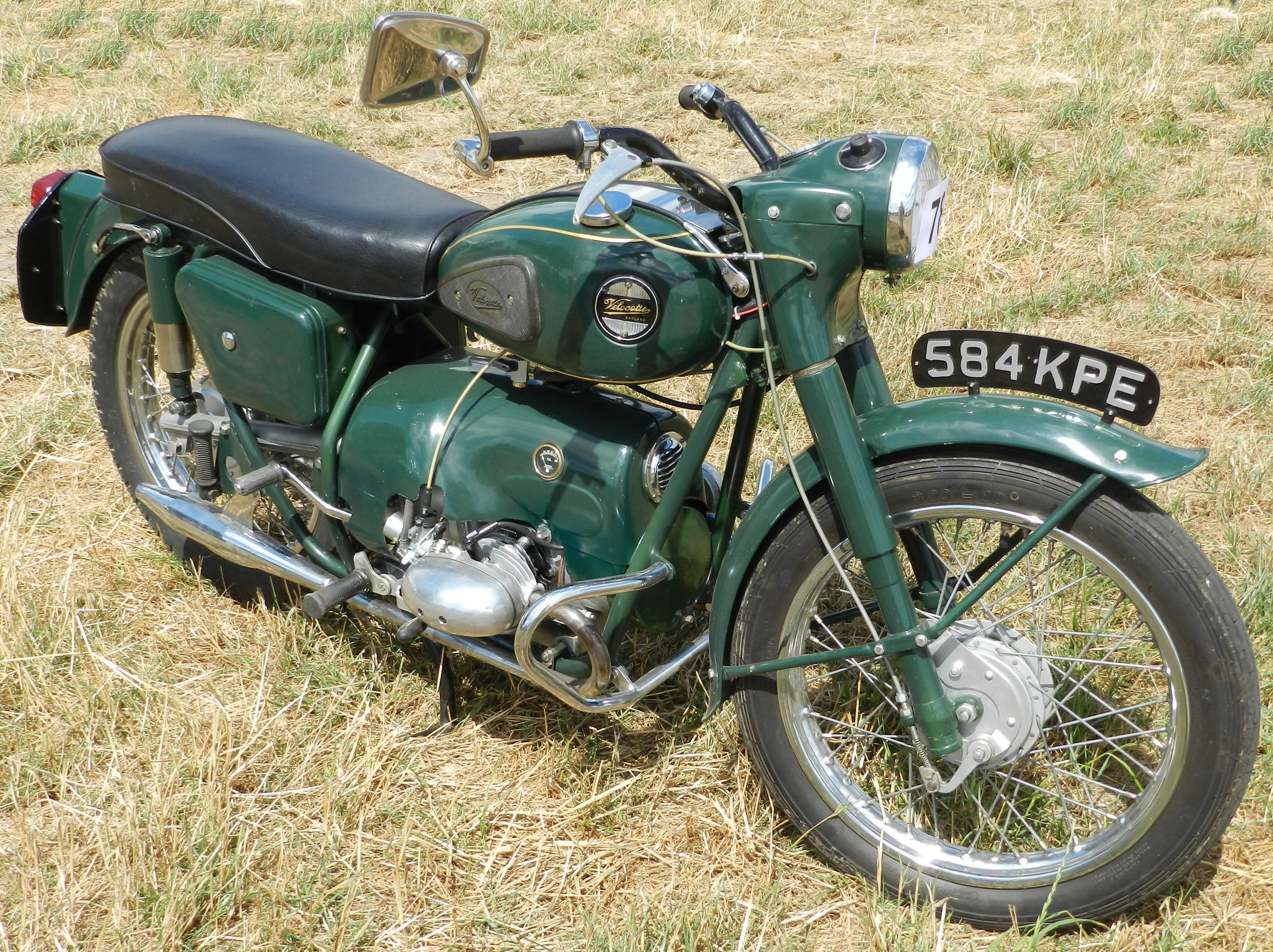
- Manufacturer: Velocette
- Production: 1957–1963
- Engine: 192 cc (11.7 cu in) OHV, air cooled, horizontally opposed twin cylinder
- Bore / stroke: 50 mm × 49 mm (2.0 in × 1.9 in)
- Power: 12 bhp (8.9 kW) at 7,000 rpm
- Transmission: four-speed gearbox to shaft final drive
- Brakes: 5 in (130 mm) drum brakes front & rear
- Tyres: 3.25x18" Front and Rear
- Wheelbase: 51 in (1,300 mm)
- Seat height: 28 in (710 mm)
- Fuel capacity: 3 US gal (11 L; 2.5 imp gal)
- Related: Velocette LE; Velocette Vogue

The Velocette Valiant was a British motorcycle produced by Velocette from 1957 to 1963. Launched at the 1956 Earl's Court Motorcycle Show, the Valiant had a 192 cc (11.7cu in) flat-twin engine but was expensive and criticized for its underpowered engine.

== Development ==
In the mid-1950s Velocette had two very different lines of motorcycles. Alongside the larger and more conventional M series, they produced a series of enclosed small capacity four-stroke flat twins for the commuter market, when most of their competitors were producing two-stroke singles.

Launched at the Earls Court Show in November 1956 the Velocette Valiant was a development of the Velocette LE. It had a two-piece cover that enclosed most of the crankcase and gearbox. The engine was based on the LE engine but differed from it considerably, with the engine converted to air cooling for simplicity and lightness. Revised cylinder heads with overhead valves were used, with the compression ratio increased to 8.5:1 from the LE's 7.0:1. A stronger crankshaft with larger bearings was used to handle the increased power, 12 horsepower (8.9 kW) to the LE's 8 horsepower (6.0 kW). The engine also had a bigger crankcase and cast iron cylinders with steel pushrod tubes and alloy heads. It was mounted in a duplex frame with a single top tube.

The clutch and four-speed gearbox were the same as those fitted to the MK3 LE as was the final drive which was through a cast aluminium pivoted fork, with a universal joint to the drive shaft. Front suspension was the same as the LE but rear suspension used Woodhead-Monroe springs with hydraulic damping. Two Amal 363 monobloc carburettors fitted to stub inlet manifolds were linked by a balancing tube. The recommended top speed was 60 mph (97 km/h).

== Reception ==
With the 250 cc class being popular in the UK, few enthusiasts were interested in an expensive 200 cc motorcycle, especially one with a four-stroke flat-twin instead of the more familiar four-stroke single or two-stroke twin. 1,600 Valiants were made between 1957 and 1963.

== Valiant Veeline ==
The 1959 Valiant Veeline (also known as the Vee Line) was the same as a standard Valiant with a 'dolphin' full fairing made of fibre glass that had big windscreen, a fascia panel housing the speedometer and ammeter, as well as a small glove box. The headlamp was mounted on brackets fixed into the fairing allowing adjustment but it did not turn with the forks.

Developed as competition for the emerging scooter market, the Veeline still had the underpowered engine of the Valiant and did not sell in sufficient numbers. The big fairing also added 21 pounds (9.5 kg) to the weight and £21 to the cost and after poor sales Velocette decided to stop production of the version in 1961.

== See also ==
- Hoffmann Gouverneur
- Victoria
