= Velocette Thruxton =

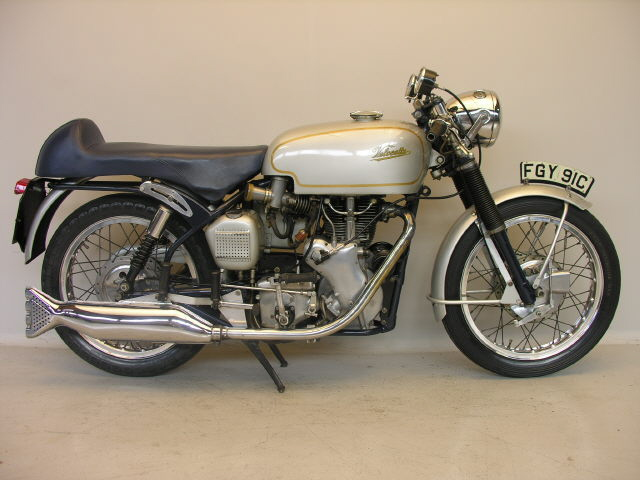
- Manufacturer: Velocette
- Also called: Venom Thruxton
- Production: 1965–1971
- Predecessor: Velocette Venom
- Engine: 499 cc (30.5 cu in), OHV air cooled single 9:1 compression ratio Amal 5GP2 1^{3}/_{8} carburettor
- Top speed: 180 km/h (110 mph)
- Power: 31 kW (41 bhp) @ 6,200 rpm
- Brakes: front drum, 7.5 inch John Tickle 2LS, rear drum
- Wheelbase: 139.1 centimetres (54.75 in)
- Seat height: 30.5 inches
- Weight: 180 kg (390 lb) (dry)
- Fuel capacity: 4.5 gallons
- Oil capacity: 4 pints
- Fuel consumption: 60mpg at 65mph

The Velocette Thruxton was a sporting motorcycle produced by Velocette between 1965 and 1971. Revealed at the 1964 Earls Court Show, it was the final development of Velocette's antiquated pushrod single, the Venom.

Sometimes referred to as the Venom Thruxton or simply Thruxton, some surviving examples could be 'upgraded' replicas based on the Venom or Viper, as many parts in the range were interchangeable. Due to the high values involved and possibility of fakes, a register was established by a member of the Velocette Owners Club, using production data of engine and frame numbers acquired after the factory closure, to enable owners and potential buyers to confirm provenance when selling and buying.

The Thruxton ceased production only when the company folded in 1971.

== Development ==
An optional cylinder head for the Venom became available for racers in 1964; a Venom equipped with this revised cylinder head took first in its class at that year's Thruxton 500, a 500-mile (800 km) endurance road race. Veloce introduced the Venom Thruxton production model in 1965 with an advertised 41 horsepower at the crankshaft. Period tests clocked it at 110 mph (180 km/h) without race tuning.

The well-proven Venom was improved by Velocette designer (and owning-family member) Bertie Goodman with rearward placed footrests having brake pedal and remote gear-change linkage to suit, close-ratio four speed gearbox, alloy rims, twin-leading shoe front brake and 'clip-on' handle bars. The engine gained a race specification cylinder head to accommodate extra-large valves, a downdraught inlet port and an Amal 5GP2 1^{3}/_{8} bore carburettor with extended inlet tract which was so long it required a special cut out in the rear of the fuel tank. The upgraded engine delivered 41 brake horsepower (31 kW), 5 bhp more than the Venom.

It was important for eligibility in endurance races such as the Thruxton 500 that competing motorcycles were genuine production machines, but although the Velocette Thruxton was sold in a road-going version, it was really targeted at the racing fraternity.

No more than 1,108 Thruxtons were manufactured before the company collapsed in 1971.

== Racing success ==
Although named after the Thruxton 500 endurance race, for 1965 the race was actually held at another disused airfield, Castle Combe, and was dubbed "The Motor Cycle 500-miler". The early-version Velocette Thruxton, ridden by Motor Cycle journalist David Dixon and racer Joe Dunphy, won the 500cc category.

In 1967 two Thruxtons, ridden by Neil Kelly and Keith Heckles gained first and second places in the 500cc Production TT, the first time a production-machine event had been staged at the Isle of Man with Kelly also recording the fastest lap at 91 mph.

== Further development ==
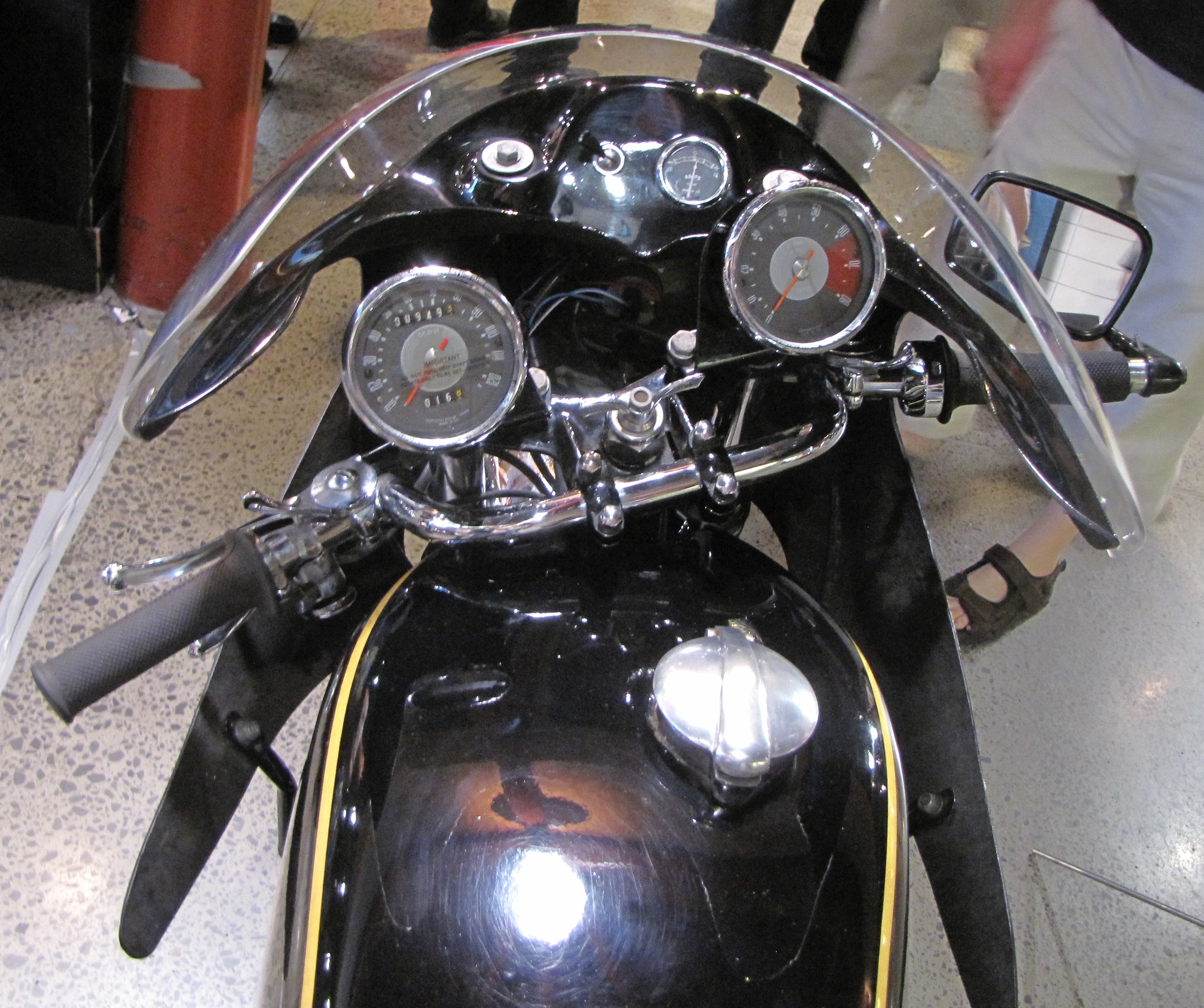
Instrumentation of a Velocette Thruxton motorcycle

Geoff Dodkin and L.Stevens were two well-known specialist motorcycle retailers in the London area offering mechanical upgrades and cycle customising parts backed by their own race experiences. These included nimonic valves, larger lightweight aluminium oil and fuel tanks, seats, smaller megaphone silencers and an alloy top yoke.

The Avon race fairing (made by Mitchenall Brothers) was introduced in 1964 in time for the June Isle of Man TT Races but the transparent, aerodynamic 'nose-cone' extending over the front race number plate area was soon 'outlawed' by the ACU, the UK motorcycle race-organisation governing body.

This led to the fairing being modified for a headlamp and offered for road use, complete with transparent nose cone.

The Velocette Thruxton Veeline version was one of the first to be available to the public, coming from the factory finished to match the standard Thruxton colour scheme in blue and silver or the optional black and silver.

== Last development ==
During the last years of Velocette production, in 1968 American entrepreneur Floyd Clymer conceived the Indian Velo 500, a limited-production run of updated machines using mainly Italian cycle parts. Clymer had negotiated supply of separate Velocette engines and gearboxes, including some Thruxton engines.
