= John Goodman (Velocette) =

British motorcycle designer

- Born: Johannes Gütgemann c. 1857; Oberwinter, Kingdom of Prussia
- Died: 1929 (aged 71–72); Malvern, Worcestershire
- Other names: John Taylor
- Occupations: Motorcycle designer and manufacturer
- Spouse: Elizabeth Ore
- Children: 5

Johannes Gütgemann (c. 1857–1929), also known as John Taylor and John Goodman, was the founder of the Velocette motorcycle company.

Gütgemann was born in Oberwinter, a town on the banks of the Rhine in the Kingdom of Prussia around 1857. His father was a successful merchant but died when Johannes was young, so when he was nineteen he moved to England to start a new life. He married Elizabeth Ore in 1884, settling near her home in Birmingham. They had five children together.

== Business ==
Shortly after his marriage, Gütgemann went into business with a partner named Barrett, who had inherited a company called "Isaac Taylor & Co." Gütgemann then adopted John Taylor as his English name, and began making bicycles and fittings. He opened a small shop in Great Hampton street in Birmingham.

He met another bicycle maker named William Gue and they started building bicycles together in 1896 under the name "Taylor Gue Ltd". In 1904 they took over the Belgian firm Kelekom Motors and began experimenting with motorized bicycles. They created their first motorcycle, the 2-horsepower Veloce, in 1905. It struggled on the marketplace and Taylor Gue was wound up in 1905. Taylor went straight on to found a new company, Veloce Limited in late 1905 to market motorcycles and related products. His son Percy had left to seek his fortune in India and another son Eugene was working as an apprentice making motorcycles at New Hudson. Inspired by their father, the brothers set up New Veloce Motors Limited at Spring Hill in Birmingham and began making motor cars in 1908.

Taylor was experimenting with a new motorcycle engine design and commissioned the engines from his sons' company, while he went on to develop the frames and cycle parts at his new premises in Fleet Street Birmingham. In 1909 he had a working prototype 276cc four stroke which had many innovative design features. The motorcycle market was very much in its infancy however, and sales were poor, so he decided to produce a 499cc belt drive model to bring in some much needed cash.

In 1911, Taylor became a naturalized British citizen, and in 1917 formally anglicized his German name to John Goodman. Veloce Motors Limited, the car company founded by his sons Percy and Eugene Goodman, had failed in 1916; in 1917 they became involved with Veloce Limited and several related companies.

In 1913, the company first used the trade name Velocette for a small two-stroke motorcycle invented by Percy, and the name was then used for many later cycles as well. Production was halted by the outbreak of the First World War and the factory was turned over to the production of munitions for the war effort.

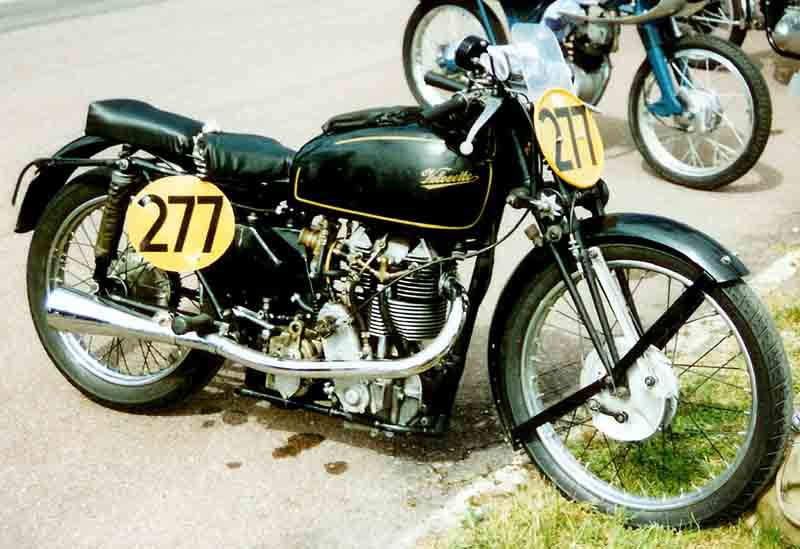
1948 Velocette KTT Mk VIII 350cc Racer

After the war the company name was changed to Velocette as this had become a recognised brand. In 1925 Goodman had a breakthrough when his 348cc overhead cam prototype was entered in the Isle of Man TT which was one of the most famous road races of the time and a great 'proving ground' for motorcycle manufacturers. In 1926 Alec Bennet won the TT on a Velocette KTT. For the next forty five years a series of very successful motorcycles followed.

In 1971 rising development costs and the owners' racing expenses took their toll on the company's bottom line and Velocette went into voluntary liquidation.
