= Velocette Venom =

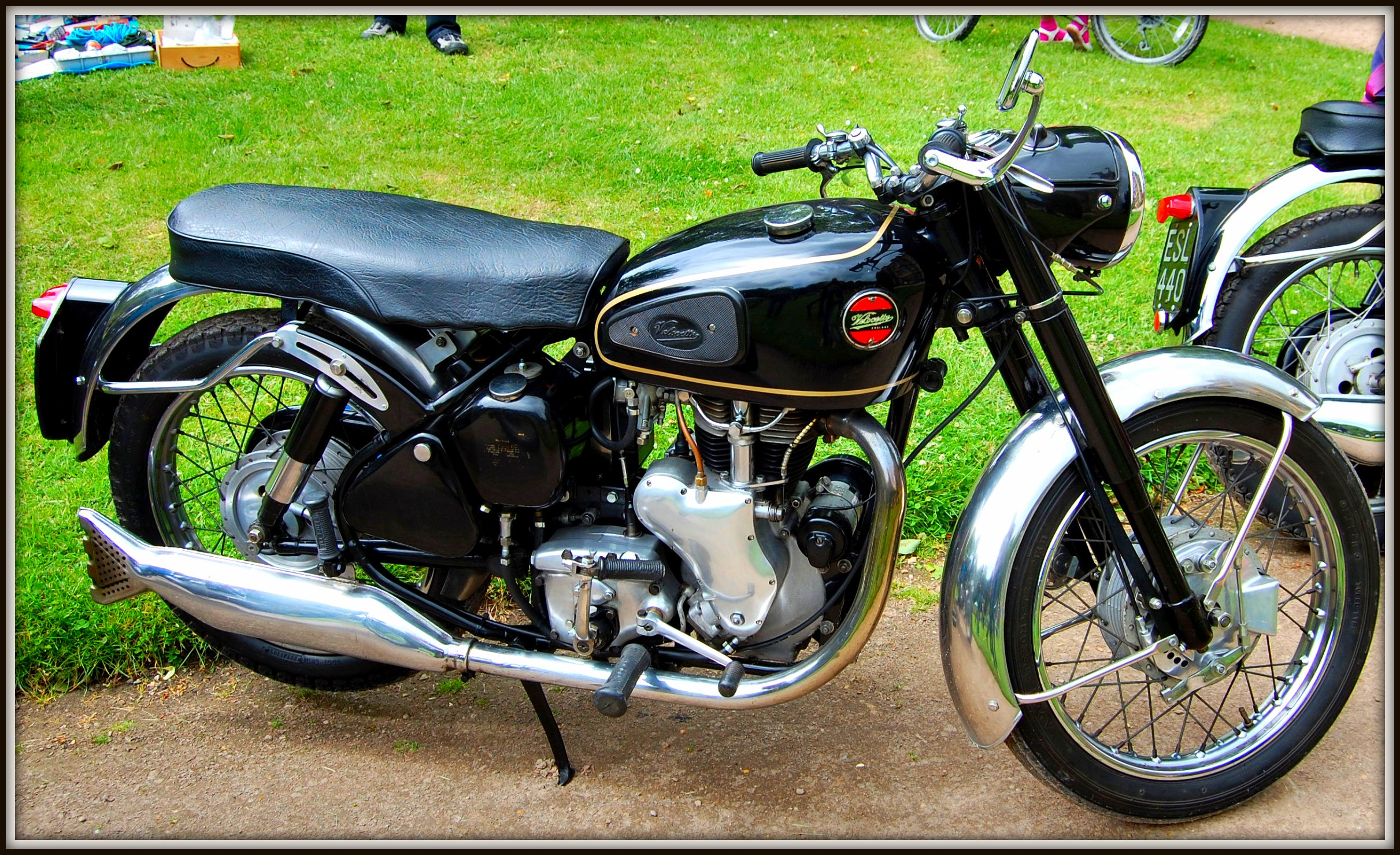
- Manufacturer: Velocette
- Production: 1955–1970
- Engine: 499 cc, OHV air-cooled single
- Bore / stroke: 86.0 mm × 86.0 mm (3.39 in × 3.39 in)
- Top speed: 100 mph
- Power: 34 bhp @ 6,200 rpm
- Brakes: drum brakes
- Wheelbase: 54.75 inches (139.1 cm)
- Weight: 390lb (177 kg) (dry)

The Velocette Venom was a 499 cc single-cylinder four-stroke British motorcycle made by Velocette at Hall Green in Birmingham. A total of 5,721 machines were produced between 1955 and 1970.

In 1961 a factory-prepared faired Velocette Venom and a team of riders set the 24-hour world record at a speed of 100.05 mph (161.01 km/h) at the Autodrome de Linas-Montlhéry, a banked oval racetrack in France. It was the first motorcycle to average over 100 mph continuously for 24 hours and no 500cc or single-cylinder motorcycle has broken this record.

In 1965, the Velocette Venom was further developed with a full racing kit to create the range-topping Velocette Thruxton, with a special cylinder head developed by American flat-track racers, and adapted by Velocette to create a new production racer. It was a very popular and successful clubman racer, winning the 1967 Isle of Man Production TT. The Thruxton became the most popular Velocette model, but could not save the Velocette company from bankruptcy in 1971. Poor trading conditions over a number of preceding years forced the company into voluntarily liquidation in 1971, with all the remaining stock and tools sold off to pay creditors.

An interesting use of the Venom power train was the Indian Velo 500, an updated, limited-production run of 250 machines devised by American entrepreneur Floyd Clymer, using a Velocette engine with Italian cycle parts.

== Development ==
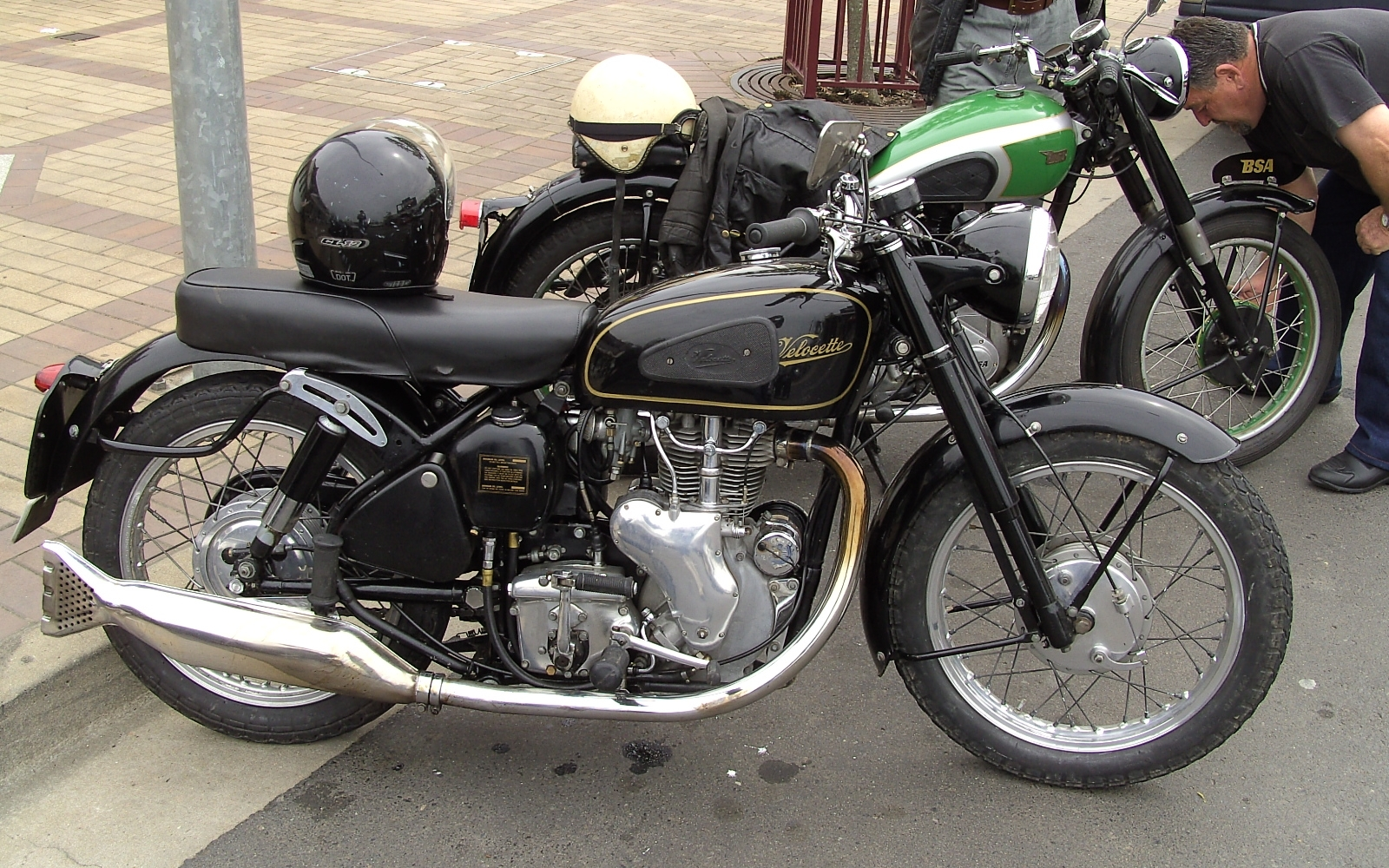
Still going in 2010

Introduced in November 1955 and launched at the same time as the 349 cc Velocette Viper, the single-cylinder Venom was developed from the Velocette MSS and needed to compete against a new range of British twin-cylinder motorcycles. Conceived by Velocette's Eugene Goodman and designed by Charles Udall, the Venom's 499 cc engine had a bi-metal cylinder with a cast-iron liner, high compression piston and a light alloy cylinder head. The design of the engine's high cam with short push-rods was simpler to produce than an overhead camshaft engine.

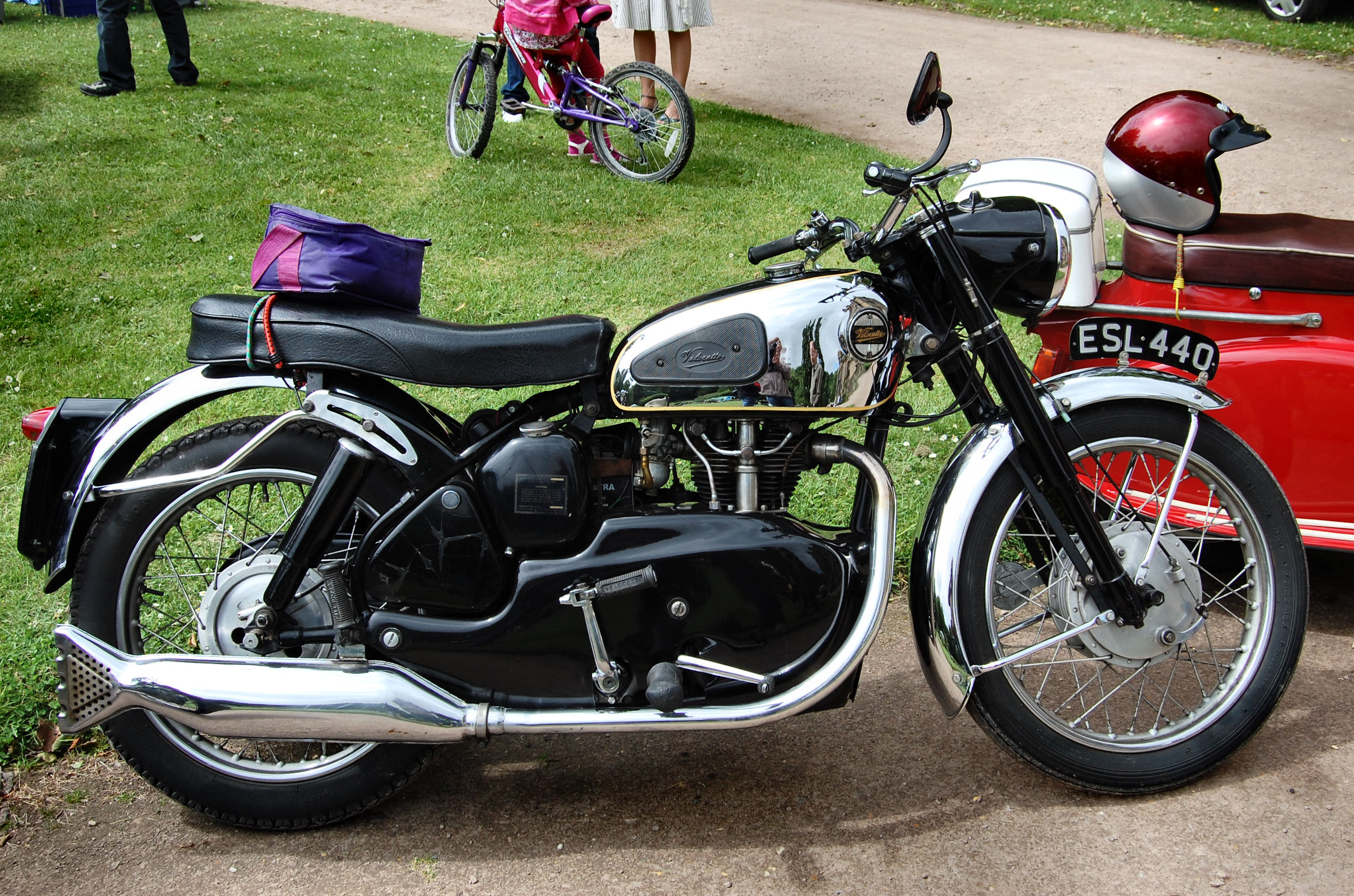
Sport model with engine fairings

The Venom had high quality chrome plating and was finished in black paintwork with gold pinstriping. The Sport models of the Venom and the Viper were among the first production motorcycles to have glass fibre enclosure panels from 1960. These quickly-detachable enclosures were produced for Velocette by Avon and extended from the front of the engine, level with the top of the crankcases, to the rear pillion footrests. Although a practical addition in preventing oil-stained clothing, the panels were unpopular with the traditional buyers of Velocette singles.

An unusual feature of the Venom design is that the clutch was between the gearbox and gearbox sprocket rather than the conventional configuration in the primary chain case on the far left, with the gearbox sprocket between the clutch and the gearbox. This made the clutch less accessible but allowed for easy gearing changes and a range of sprockets with different numbers of teeth could be fitted by removing the sprocket cover. The gearbox was also a novel Velocette design with a constant mesh close ratio unit that could be maintained relatively easily while still in place.

Simply designed with single top and down tubes, the Venom's heavy brazed-lug frame (which had clear origins in bicycle manufacture) was well proven for its handling capability. At the rear was an unusual swinging arm design with two separate arms clamped to a cross-tube instead of the traditional welded-section rear fork. Although this was effective, it was difficult to set up the horizontal alignment. The rear shock absorbers were originally made by Woodhead Monroe, then replaced by Armstrong units and eventually Girling shocks. These could easily be adjusted to suit the rider's preference by moving them in special curved slots. The front telescopic forks, designed by Velocette and manufactured in-house, had hydraulic damping and an offset wheel spindle.

The Venom used Miller electrics up to 1962, with a belt-driven dynamo. After 1962 this was changed to a Lucas system. The speedometer, ammeter and light switch on the original Venoms were fitted into a steel headlamp nacelle; the optional rev counter had to go on a bracket. Later models with Thruxton forks had conventional headlamp brackets and separate instruments.

The Venom became Velocette's best-selling flagship model and is now considered a notable example of British sports four-stroke single motorcycles.

== Venom Scrambler ==
In December 1954, the Velocette development team built Venom off-road motorcycles, which were sent to the United States for evaluation in enduro events. Advertised with the slogan "A winner in every respect", the MK1 Scrambler used the same frame design as road going models of the time (such as the MAC, MSS, Viper and Venom) whilst being equipped with light alloy mudguards and a high-level enduro-style exhaust pipe. The MK2 Scrambler arrived in 1958 featuring featured a specially designed frame with triangulated removable rear section and fixed rear suspension points. A special off-road Venom was named the Endurance. Fitted with the Venom engine, it had a 21-inch front wheel, high handlebars and a small fuel tank, as well as full lighting so that it could be legally used on the roads.

== Venom Clubman ==
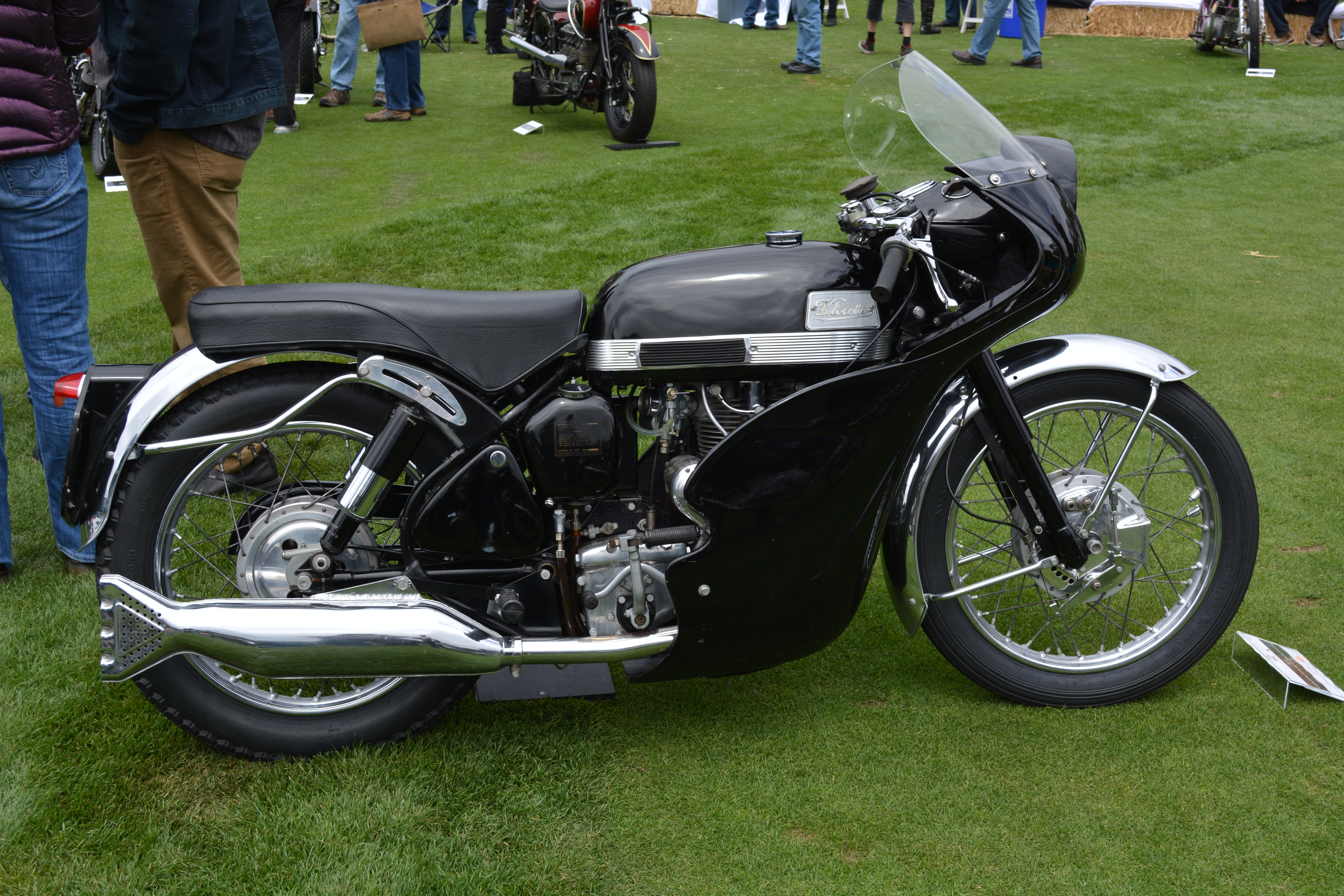
Clubman Mk2 'Veeline' version with factory-specified Avon fairing, TLS front brake, dropped handlebars and rear-set footrests

From 1960, Velocette produced the Venom (and the Viper) in a Clubman racing version, fitted with Amal TT carburettors, a manually controlled BTH racing magneto (in place of the Lucas unit) and a close-ratio gearbox, with the compression ratio raised to 9.3 to 1. The Venom Clubman dispensed with the glass fibre enclosure and instead made a feature of highly polished crankcase and gearbox castings. Supplied with "rearset" controls, lowered handlebars and a steering damper, the Clubman also had a range of optional accessories including a "megaphone" exhaust silencer, a rev counter and light alloy wheel rims. Although they could be difficult to start – an entire section in the owners handbook was dedicated to starting technique – experienced Clubman riders found them easy to maintain and fast, as the Venom Clubman could achieve over 100 mph. In 1966 the Venom was upgraded to the Mk II, which had the Thruxton front forks fitted with rubber gaiters, a twin leading shoe front brake and narrowed mudguards, combined with a new exhaust design giving it a more modern sports motorcycle look.

== Velocette Venom Thruxton ==
In 1965, the well-proven Venom was improved by Velocette designer Bertie Goodman with a special race kit complete with radically revised cylinder head, an Amal Grand Prix carburetor and reworked cam followers. A prototype for this new cylinder head was sent to the factory by Los Angeles Velocette dealer and race sponsor Lou Branch. The new cylinder head had a 1 3/8" inlet tract, a 2" inlet valve, an 8" finned carburetor manifold, and used a 1 3/8" Amal GP2 racing carburetor, to produce 41 hp. The following year this went into production as the Velocette Thruxton. Also known as the Venom Thruxton, this aimed to fill the gap left by the demise of the BSA Gold Star and was named after the Thruxton Circuit race track on a former wartime airfield in Hampshire where race-prepared Venoms had performed particularly well in production racing events. The Velocette Thruxton was a true racer, with a full race specification cylinder head that was gas flowed by hand to accommodate extra-large valves and a downdraught inlet port. The Amal carburetor was so large it required a distinctive cutaway in the bottom of the fuel tank, and race cams boosted performance to up to 120 mph (190 km/h). As well as the traditional black-with-gold-lining finish, the Velocette Thruxton was also produced with an unusual blue frame, forks and seat and silver petrol tank with gold lining. In 1968 the Lucas magneto was phased out, and Velocette replaced it with coil ignition. A total of 1108 Thruxtons were built, but although it had more power than the Venom the Thruxton could not save Velocette. The company went into liquidation in February 1971. The Thruxton has gone on to become one of the most sought-after of all classic British motorcycles, with many private owners having converted standard Venom models to the more valuable Thruxton specification. Velocette Owners Club Thruxton Registrar Ray Thurston has comprehensive records of all Thruxton machines and any prospective purchaser should check with him that any intended purchase is in fact genuine.

== 24-hour world record ==
On 18 March 1961 a factory-prepared Velocette Venom Clubman with fairing set the 24-hour world record at an average speed of 100.05 mph (161.01 km/h). It was the first motorcycle of any size to top the 100 mph in 24 hours and, as at 2008, no motorcycle of the same capacity has been able to equal or improve on this record. The record attempt took place at the Montlhéry oval track, a 2.7 km (1.7 miles) concrete track just outside Paris with a very uneven road surface and poor track lighting. A team of six French riders were accompanied by Motor Cycling journalist Bruce Main-Smith, who achieved the best lap time of 107 mph despite the poor lighting conditions. After securing the 12-hour record at more than 104 mph (167 km/h), the team went on to complete the 24-hour endurance record attempt. Stopping only to change riders and refuel (from a bucket using a funnel), the Venom secured the world record. The publicity was very important for Velocette, as the success revived sales of the Venom, which went on to become one of Velocette's best-selling motorcycles. The Venom which set the 24-hour world record is on display at the British National Motorcycle Museum.

== Racing success ==
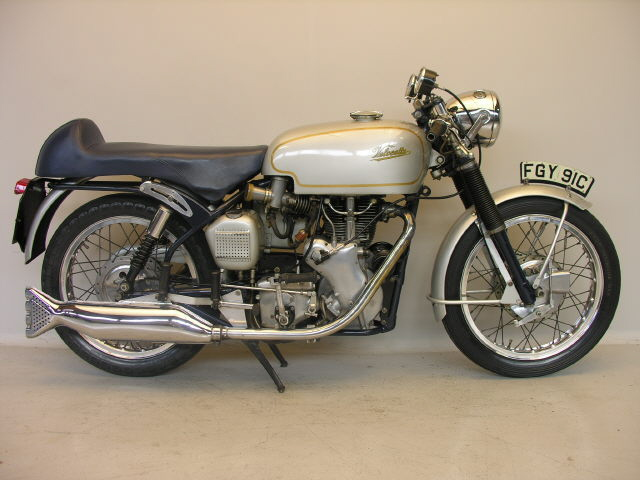
1965 Velocette Venom Thruxton

At the 1964 Thruxton 500 endurance race, Velocette Venoms took the first three places in the 500 cc category, with winners Alan Harris and Howard German on a Stevens-entered machine finishing third overall in with the larger-capacity machines.

A specially styled, high-performance 'Thruxton' version of the Venom with high-quality equipment was announced in late 1964, and subsequently a Thruxton ridden by Motor Cycle journalist David Dixon and Joe Dunphy won the 1965 Thruxton 500 race, held at another disused airfield, the Castle Combe Circuit.

In 1967 two Venom Thruxton motorcycles, ridden by Neil Kelly and Keith Heckles gained first and second places in the Production TT, a category for road-based machines with limited controlled-modifications first staged at the Isle of Man in that year; Kelly also recorded the fastest lap at 91 mph. Prepared by Reg Orpin, workshop manager at London Velocette dealer L.Stevens, the winning motorcycle was far from standard, for as well as being in Thruxton trim, the valve gear included titanium tips to the pushrods and valve caps. A Norton Manx piston had been specially engineered at Velocette's Hall Green Workshops, and it had cam followers on needle rollers as well as light alloy timing wheels. It was nearly all for nothing, however, as Kelly failed to start and the rest of the field left him struggling to kick start the Venom. Orpin managed to start it just in time, and despite his poor start, Neil Kelly caught up with the other riders within three miles and went on to win the 500 cc class, recording 121 mph as he passed the Highlander speed trap.

The late Roger Bowler rode to his first ever win on a modified 500cc 1960 Clubman Venom, winning the Ecurie Sportive trophy donated by Stan Hailwood. The occasion was in April 1966 at the Brands Hatch circuit. The machine was prepared by his long time friend Ian Simpson according to specifications published by L. Stevens the London Velocette dealers. This was his only success on a Velocette although he went on to many other successes riding a wide variety of makes.

== Further development ==
The Indian Velo 500 was a limited-production run of updated machines conceived by American entrepreneur Floyd Clymer in 1968, using a Velocette engine and gearbox with mainly Italian cycle parts, including a lightweight frame from the Italjet company, Marzocchi front forks with Grimeca front hub having a twin-leading shoe brake, Borrani aluminium rims and quickly-detachable tank and seat, resulting in a weight-saving of 45 lb (20 kg) compared to the traditional Venom.

The project ended abruptly due to Clymer's death and the failure of Velocette, with 200 machines shipped to US and a further 50 remaining in Italy, which were bought by London Velocette dealer Geoff Dodkin. When roadtesting, UK monthly magazine Motorcycle Sport described it as "British engineering and Italian styling in a package originally intended for the American market", reporting that Dodkin would supply his bikes with either a standard Venom engine specification, or, at higher cost, a Thruxton version.
