= Velocette =

English motorcycle manufacturer, 1904–1971

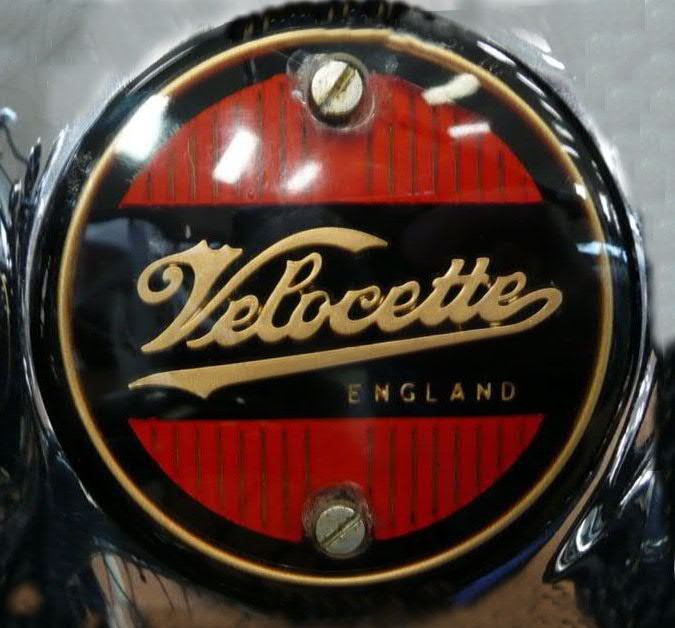
- Badge on motorcycle fuel tank
- Industry: Motorcycle
- Founded: 1904
- Founder: John Goodman
- Defunct: 1971
- Fate: Voluntarily liquidated
- Headquarters: Birmingham, England
- Key people: John Goodman, Eugene Goodman, Percy Goodman, Peter Goodman
- Products: Motorcycles
- Parent: Veloce Ltd

Velocette is a range of motorcycles made by Veloce Ltd, in Hall Green, Birmingham, England. One of several motorcycle manufacturers in Birmingham, Velocette was a small, family-owned firm, selling almost as many hand-built motorcycles during its lifetime as the mass-produced machines of the giant BSA and Norton concerns. Renowned for the quality of its products, the company was "always in the picture" in international motorcycle racing from the mid-1920s until the 1950s, culminating in two World Championship titles (1949–1950 350 cc) and its legendary and still-unbeaten (for single-cylinder, 500 cc machines) 24 hours at over 100 mph (161 km/h) record. Veloce, while small, was a great technical innovator and many of its patented designs are commonplace on motorcycles today, including the positive-stop foot shift and swinging arm rear suspension with hydraulic dampers. The business suffered a gradual commercial decline during the late 1960s, eventually closing in February 1971.

== Foundation ==
The company had its origins as "Taylor, Gue Co Ltd" founded in 1896 by John Goodman (born Johannes Gütgemann and later known as John Taylor before formally changing his name to Johann Goodman) and William Gue, which initially made cycle frames and parts, but later made the frames for the Ormonde Motorcycle. In January 1904 they were working on a tri-car powered by a 3.5HP water-cooled four-stroke engine, with 2-speed gearbox and novel clutch system. In 1904 Ormonde merged with the engine maker Kelecombe, and when this company failed Taylor Gue bought the assets, and in 1905 built their first motorcycle, the Veloce.

Later that year, John Taylor set up Veloce Limited, to produce cycles and related products and services, and business continued for several years producing Veloce Cycles, but with his sons Percy and Eugene he investigated the use of engines as the Veloce Motor Company and produced the V.M.C motorcycle in 1910, this had a 500cc side-valve engine with direct belt-drive and the option of a hub gear. In 1912 New Veloce Motors Ltd was formed, with J. Taylor and P.J. Taylor as shareholders, registered at Veloce Works, Spring Hill, Birmingham. This company may have been to separate the risks of venturing into motorcycle manufacture from the rest of the business, but New Veloce Motors was wound up during WW1.

== Veloce Motorcycles ==
The original Veloce was produced for a very short time in 1905 by Taylor Gue Ltd after acquiring the assets of Ormonde and Kelecombe (possibly because Taylor Gue had not been paid for their work on cycleparts for Ormonde).

It was in 1910 that Veloce Motor Company launched the V.M.C. motorcycle, with a 3.5HP (500cc) side-valve engine (85mm bore and 88mm stroke). Transmission was by belt-drive with the option of an Armstrong 3-speed hub gear.

In 1912 they added a smaller motorcycle, which was exhibited at the Olympia show alongside their larger model on a joint stand with Wilton Cycle Co (sidecar manufacturers). The new lightweight model had an inlet over exhaust valve arrangement, which was unusually at the front of the engine with the inlet valve being mechanically operated. The show report listed the bore and stroke as 70mm by 76mm, with pump fed oil lubrication and an outside flywheel. The two speed transmission on the smaller model was integral with the engine, an early example of unit construction patented by Percy Taylor under UK Patent 24499 in 1910. A version of this machine (enlarged to 76mm bore) was entered in the 1913 T.T. with Cyril Pullin as rider, but an oil leak caused a poor performance due to the oil getting on the belt drive.

In 1913 Veloce again exhibited their motorcycles on the Wilton Cycle and Motor Co stand, the Veloce models continued alongside the new Velocette 2-stroke. A larger version of the lightweight Veloce 4-stroke rated 2.75HP used 76mm bore (like the previous year's T.T. model) was shown as ladies and gents models, the ladies model having a dropped frame and extra engine covers. The larger 500cc Veloce continued unchanged.

The success of the Velocette model that followed was such that when in 1925 the overhead camshaft 350 was launched under the name Veloce - the dealers protested, and the name Velocette was henceforth used for all the motorcycles.

== Velocette two-strokes ==
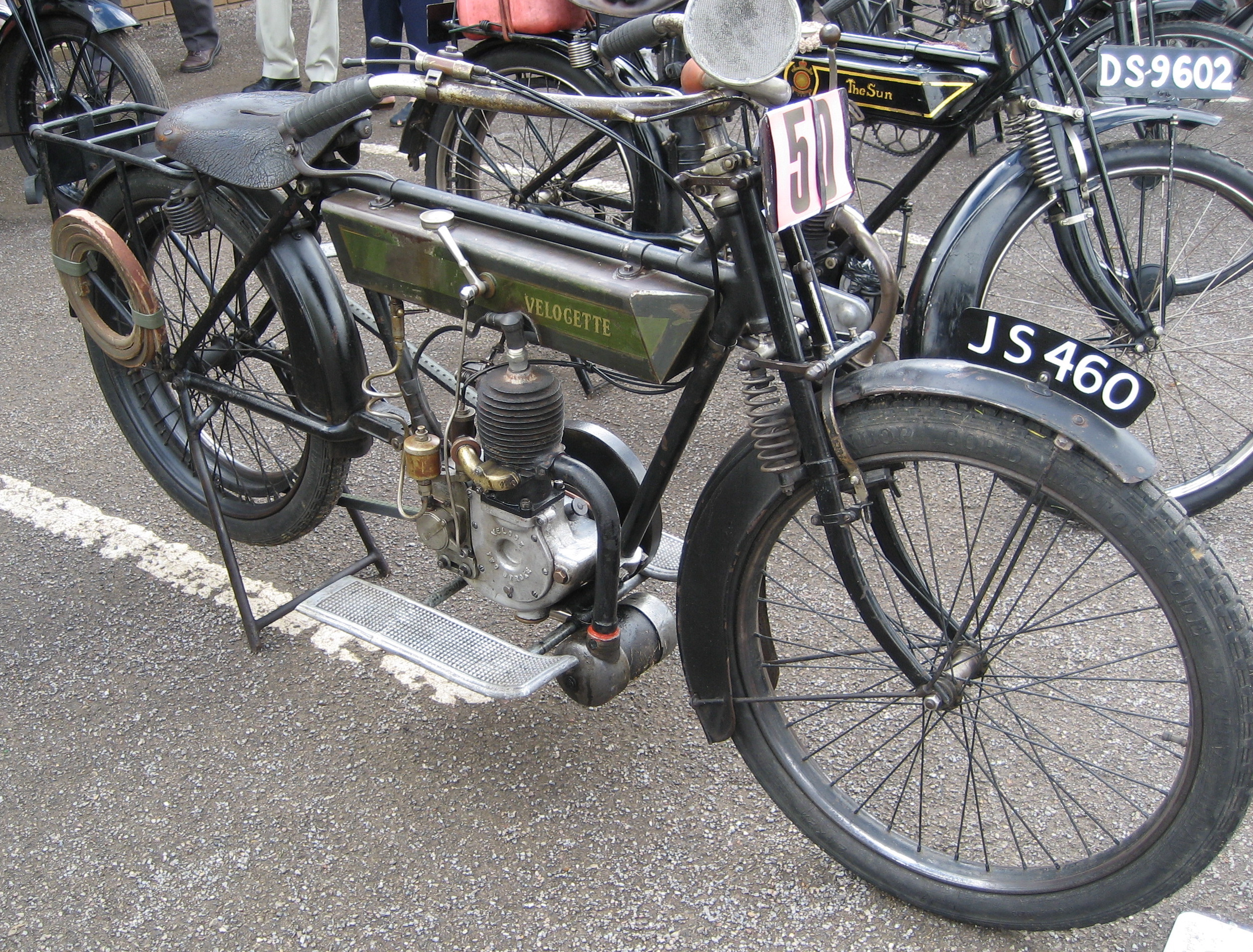
1913 Velocette Model A

The first two-stroke, built in 1913, was called a Velocette. When The 'K' series reverted to Veloce, the buying public overlooked them, having become used to the Velocette name and associating it with quality products. The Velocette name was reprised, and used for all subsequent models. Between 1913 and 1925, Veloce produced expensive, high-quality two-stroke motorcycles of (nominally) 250 cc, which gained an excellent reputation and were entered in competitions such as the Isle of Man TT, with some success. The single-cylinder machines had many advanced features, such as a throttle-controlled oil pump, which set them apart from other manufacturers' products. (The introduction of this device was claimed erroneously, much later, by Suzuki). The factory gradually developed this machine from the "A" series and variants (A, AC2 - coil ignition, two-speed gearbox, AC3 – three-speed gearbox, etc.), then the "H" series, the model U and variants, culminating in the model GTP in 1930, which was produced until 1946. The GTP was a reliable lightweight motorcycle with good steering and power delivery.

== Velocette 'K' series ==
In the early 1920s Veloce realised that, in order to grow as a company, it needed a new machine of advanced specification. It therefore developed an overhead camshaft (OHC) 350 cc engine, which became known as the 'K' series and was introduced in 1925. After a year of teething troubles with this new design, Veloce entered slightly modified 'K' models into racing events such as the Isle of Man TT and Brooklands races. The reliability and sweet running qualities of their new engine led to a long string of racing successes and the introduction of a production racing model, the KTT, built between 1928 and 1949. The 1929 KTT was the first production motorcycle to feature a positive-stop, foot-actuated gearchange. The roadster models developed from this initial model K were the Velocette KSS (super sports), KTS (touring sports), KTP (twin exhaust ports), KN (normal), and a few variations. A notable change in engine design was introduced in 1935, the 'KSS Mk2' with a fully enclosed aluminium cylinder head. The OHC engine series continued for roadsters until 1948, when the final KSS Mk.2 versions were produced, with rigid frames and Dowty air-sprung telescopic forks. Accurate valve timing was accomplished through the pioneering use of stroboscopic lamps. The 'K' series showed an excellent turn of speed and reliability and soon the factory developed racing models to compete in the Isle of Man TT.

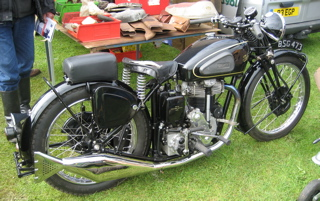
Velocette KSS Mk II

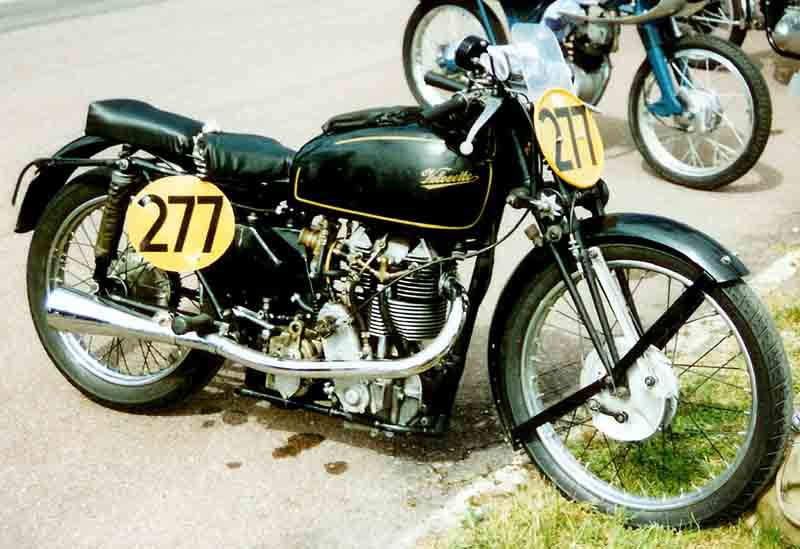
Velocette KTT Mk VIII 350 cc OHC Racer 1948

== Velocette 'M' series ==
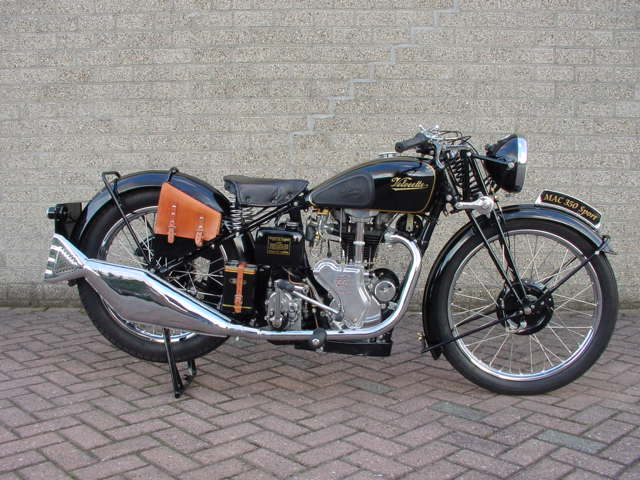
1936 Velocette MAC Sport

The K series was expensive to produce, requiring selective hand assembly of the shaft-and-bevel camshaft drive; it was determined that a simpler OHV design would be quicker to build and require less skilled labour to assemble and so the company decided to introduce a new line of overhead valve (OHV) machines, in order to cut production costs and make a more affordable motorcycle. The first of these new machines, in 1933, was the MOV, using a 250 cc engine of 'square' dimensions (68 mm bore and 68 mm stroke). It was an immediate sales success, having lively performance for the time (78 mph or 126 km/h), and proved a reliable machine with excellent road manners. From this machine, by lengthening the stroke of the crankshaft, the Velocette MAC 350 cc was introduced in 1934. It proved even more popular than the MOV, and became a real money spinner for the company, bringing much needed capital into the firm. In 1935 an entirely new machine was introduced, based on the two previous OHV models, the Velocette MSS of 500 cc. A new, heavier frame was fitted, with the intention that the machine could serve as a sidecar hauler. This new frame was developed from the MkV KTT racing machine, and was shared with the KSS MkII of 1936–1948. The MSS also proved very popular and profitable for Veloce. A 350 cc version of the MOV was the basis for the company's World War II military motorcycles.

== Post war ==
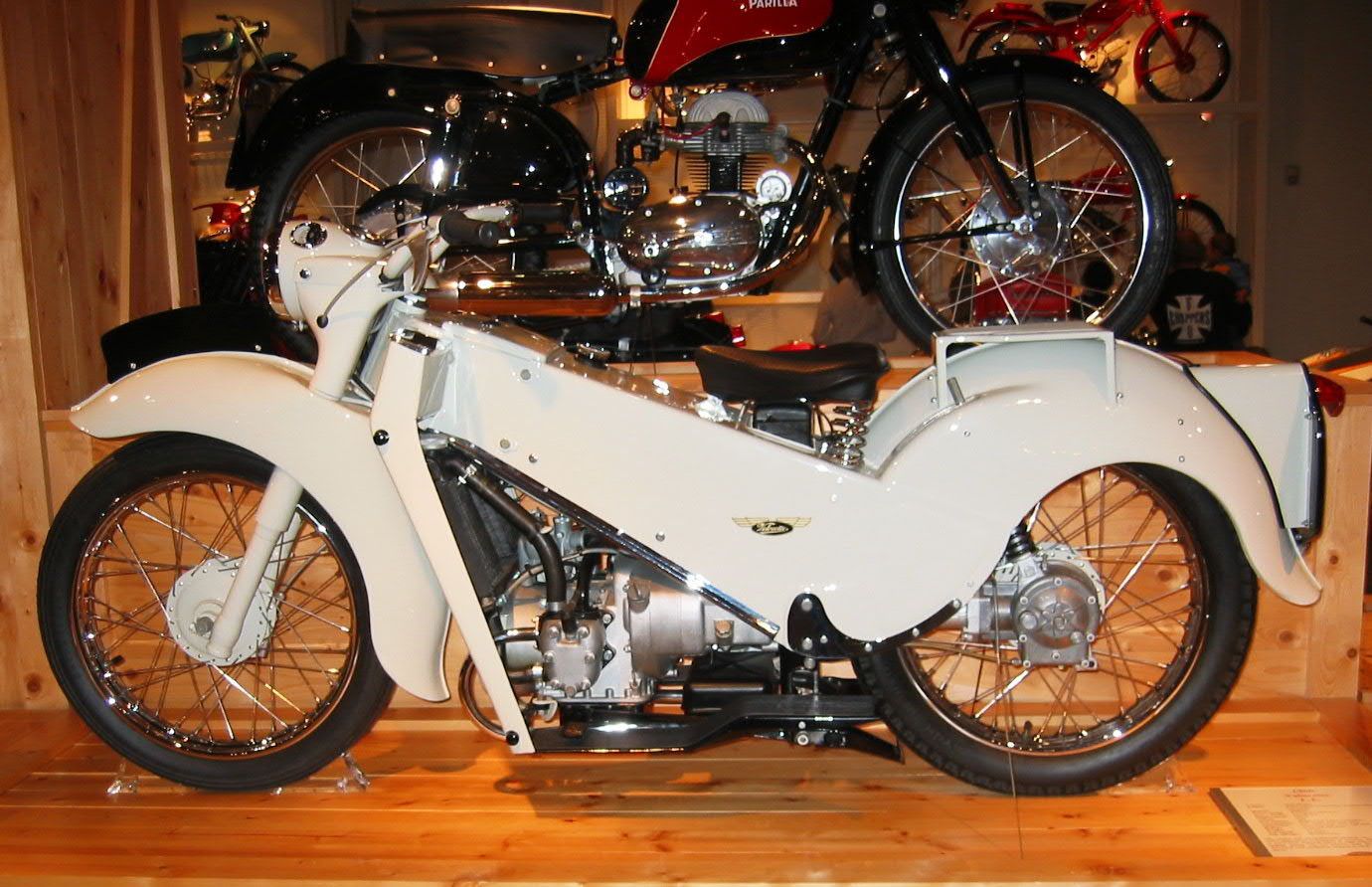
1953 Velocette LE

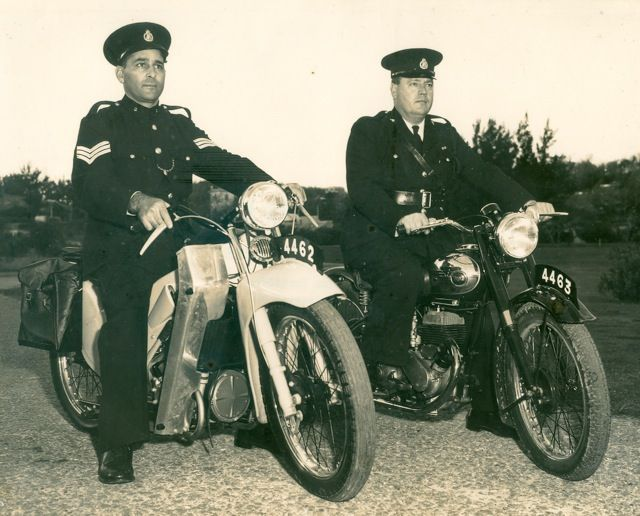
Bermuda Police officers on Velocette LE and BSA motorcycles in 1953

After the Second World War, the company sought to capture what it saw as a developing need for personal transport and created the LE model (for "Little Engine"). This was a 149 cc water-cooled flat-twin with side valves, a pressed steel frame, telescopic forks and a swingarm. Velocette's Director, Eugene Goodman, planned an innovative and radical design that would appeal to a new market that needed cheap, clean and reliable transport. Designer Charles Udall developed the Velocette LE as a "conceived-as-a-whole" design, with engine, gearbox, drive shaft and bevel box in a single unit to do a specific job. It was sophisticated and expensive. It proved less successful than the firm had hoped and, although it became Veloce's best selling model ever, the high tooling costs for this all-new machine were barely recouped.

It did see widespread adoption by British police forces for urban patrol. At the time Metropolitan Police Officers on foot patrol were required to salute inspectors. With the introduction of the motorcycle patrols this became dangerous, requiring the officer to take his hand off the handle bars, and so the rider was allowed to show his respect with a smart nod. It has been suggested that this is how Velocette LEs became known as "Noddy Bikes". However, Noddy (the popular cartoon character created by British children's author Enid Blyton) who famously had frequent run-ins with the Policeman Mr. Plod, is also credited with being the origin.

The market for sporting machines was still strong, and Velocette continued to produce the 348cc KTT for racing. At the 1947 Isle of Man TT the company won the first four places in the Junior race. In 1949 they were the first FIM 350cc World Champions, a feat which they repeated in 1950. In 1967 Neil Kelly won the first Isle of Man Production TT in the 500cc class on a Velocette Thruxton, with another Thruxton in second place.

== Later models ==
The 1954 499 cc Velocette MSS proved a successful export to the American desert racing scene, prompting the development of scrambler and enduro versions of the bike, the 349 cc Viper and 499 cc Venom, both introduced in 1956. A 1958 review in The Motor Cycle, an English weekly paper, called the Viper "a remarkably fine motorcycle, all round performance well above the average" and declared it capable of speeds over 90 mph (144.84 km/h). In 1961 a Velocette Venom became the first motorcycle to cover over 2,400 miles (3,900 km) in a 24-hour period, at the banked, oval, Montlhery circuit in France with a team of eight riders including Veloce director Bertie Goodman and 'MotorCycling' staff writer Bruce Main-Smith, averaging 100.05 mph (161.01 km/h).

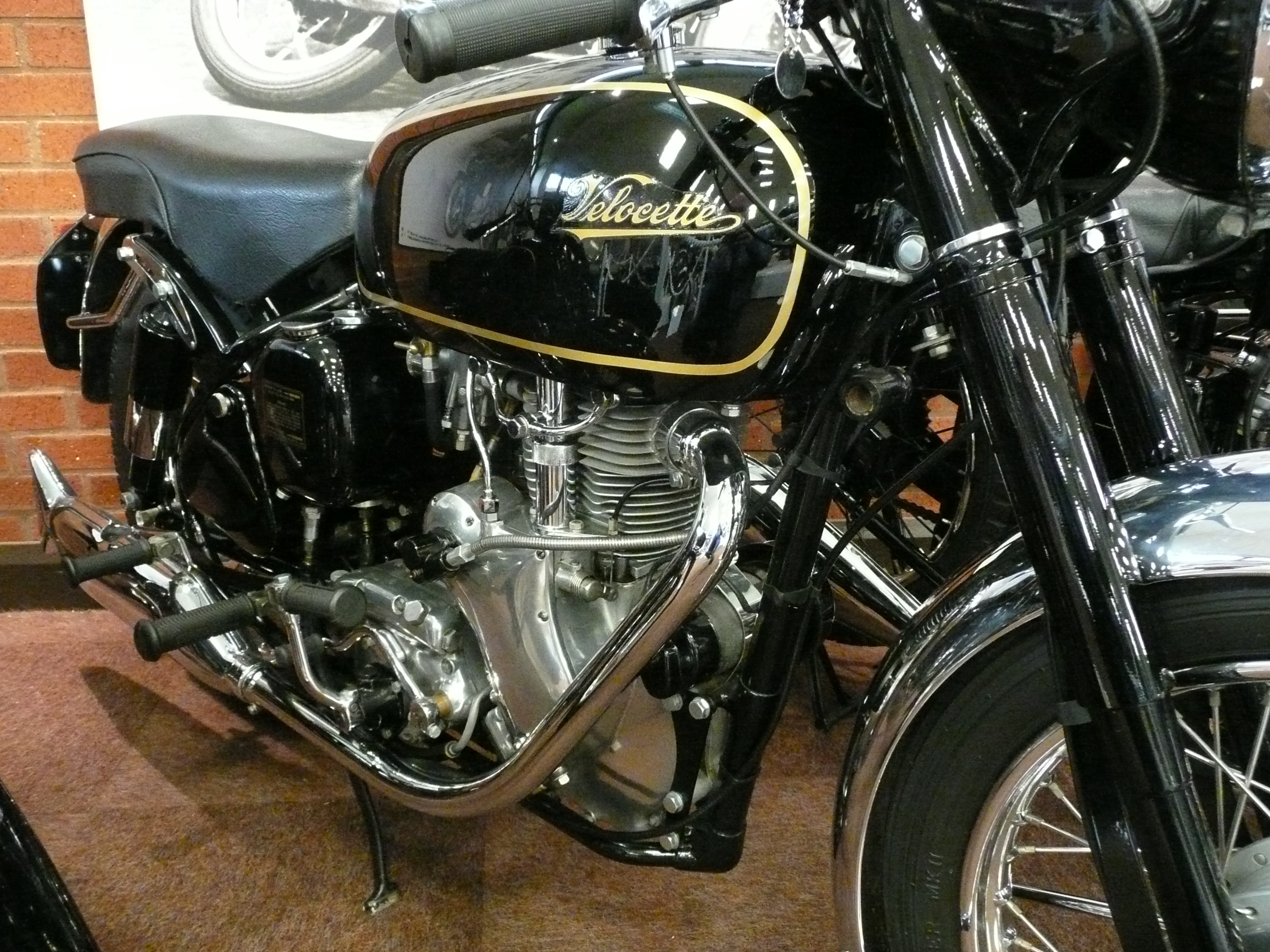
The Velocette Venom 1961

This record for up to 500cc capacity machines still stands to the present day. The machine still exists; although badly damaged in the disastrous fire at the National Motorcycle Museum in Birmingham, it was restored by Velocette Owners Club president Ivan Rhodes with assistance from club members.

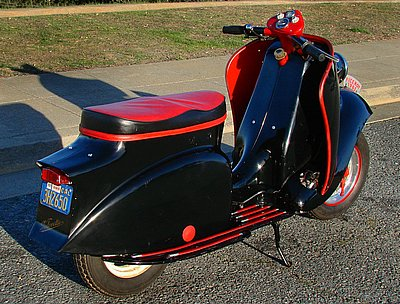
1961 Velocette Viceroy

In 1960, Velocette introduced the Viceroy, a very unusual 250 cc opposed twin two-stroke scooter. Unique to the Viceroy was the front-mounted twin-cylinder engine, and the fuel tank mounted under the front legshield. The engine itself was extremely compact, and connected to the rear-mounted clutch and transmission by a drive shaft from the engine-mounted flywheel. With electric start, 12-volt electrics, a very low centre of gravity, power over 15 hp (11 kW) and a reported comfortable cruising speed of 65 mph (105 km/h), performance, handling and features of the Viceroy were first class. The scooter came as market forces and rider preferences were changing, and the Viceroy was not a sales success. The late 1960s were the last years of production for Velocette motorcycles, production for the Velocette Viper and Vogue ending in 1968, "Special", Scrambler and Endurance in 1969, and MSS Venom and Velocette Thruxton in 1970. Veloce Ltd. closed in February 1971.

== Commercial failure ==
The business had struggled since 1956, with government changes to hire purchase legislation and fuel rationing during the Suez Crisis. Major losses incurred on the Viceroy scooter development from 1956 to marketing in 1960, followed by costs incurred by overstocking of redundant parts and the loss of capital due to development costs invested in another new model doomed to failure – the Velocette Vogue, an updated LE with a full fibreglass touring body. Sales were quoted as "a few hundred over five years", and development costs were never recovered either by Veloce or Avon, the bodywork manufacturer. All were key components in the financial decline.

The business commercially failed in the late 1960s, although profits from spare-part sales after the acquisition of the Royal Enfield spares operation in 1967 defrayed operational costs to such an extent that the company as a whole survived for another three years.

The workforce was sacked in February 1971, with C C Cooper, a local metals-recovery dealer, buying most of the machinery and continuing to produce limited spare parts by a small team of engineers. The rights to use the Velocette name and manufacture parts were then sold on to the Holder family, and the buildings at Hall Green were demolished.

== See also ==
- List of Velocette motorcycles
