= Velocette Viper =

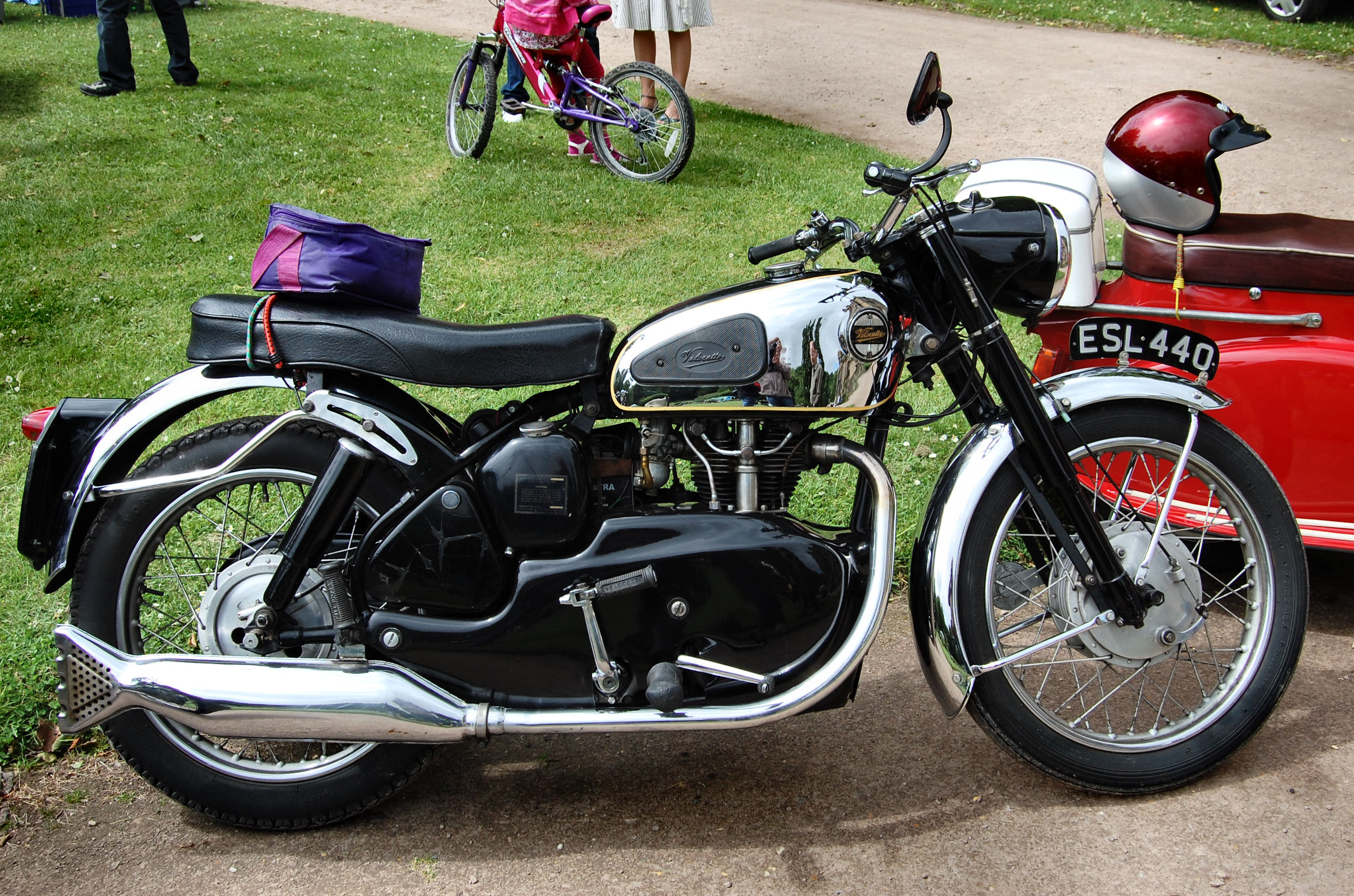
- Manufacturer: Velocette
- Production: 1955-1968
- Engine: 349 cc, OHV air cooled single
- Top speed: 91 mph
- Power: 28 bhp @ 7,000 rpm
- Brakes: drum brakes
- Wheelbase: 53.25 inches (135.3 cm)
- Weight: 364 pounds (165 kg) (dry)
- Fuel capacity: 3.5 gallons
- Turning radius: 16 feet (4.9 m)

The Velocette Viper is a British motorcycle made by Velocette between 1955 and 1968. Built using traditional methods and materials, it struggled to compete against more modern machines, so from 1960 the designers added new glass fibre enclosure panels, making the Viper one of the first enclosed production motorcycles.

== Development ==
Introduced in October 1955, the single-cylinder Viper was developed from the 500cc Velocette MSS which also led to the almost identical 500cc Velocette Venom. Designed by Charles Udall, the Viper's 349cc engine had a bi-metal cylinder with a cast iron liner, high compression piston and a light alloy cylinder head. Using the same bottom end as the Venom, the Viper had a lot of chrome plating and was offered in a choice of black or "willow green" paintwork. The Viper was one of the first to have glass fibre enclosure panels from 1962. These panels extended from the front of the engine, level with the top of the crankcase, to the rear pillion footrests. but proved unpopular with the traditional buyers of Velocette singles.

== Viper Clubman ==
From 1960 Velocette produced the Viper in a "Clubman" racing version, fitted with TT Amal carburettors, a BTH racing magneto and a close ratio gearbox, with the compression ratio raised to 9.3 to 1. The Clubman dispensed with the unpopular glass fibre enclosure and instead made a feature of its highly polished crankcase and gearbox castings. Supplied with "rearset" controls, lowered handlebars and a steering damper, the Clubman also had a range of optional accessories including a "megaphone" exhaust silencer, a rev counter and light alloy wheel rims.

== Viper Scrambler ==
In December 1958 the Velocette development team built 25 off-road Vipers, which were sent to the United States for evaluation in enduro events. Built to the Viper Clubman standard, the Scrambler had a specially lightened frame and high level enduro style exhaust pipes.

== Viper Special ==
The Velocette Viper Special was introduced in November 1962 and featured a three-gallon tank, pressed steel full width hub and the Velocette MSS rear hub as well as a '100 mph' speedometer in a modified headlamp nacelle.
