= Eugene Goodman (businessman) =

British motorcycle pioneer

- Born: Birmingham, England
- Occupations: Motorcycle designer and manufacturer

Eugene Goodman was the co-founder of the Velocette motorcycle company with his father John Goodman.

Eugene was born in Birmingham. His father had a small shop on Great Hampton Street in Birmingham selling and making bicycles and fittings. Eugene began working as an apprentice making motorcycles at New Hudson. Inspired by their father, he and his brother Percy set up New Veloce Motors Limited at Spring Hill in Birmingham and began making motor cars in 1908. Their father was experimenting with a new motorcycle engine design and commissioned the engines to be made by his sons, while he went on to develop the frames and cycle parts at his works in Fleet Street, Birmingham. In 1909 they had a working prototype 276cc four stroke which had many innovative design features. The motorcycle market was very much in its infancy, however and sales were poor so he decided to produce a 499cc belt drive model to bring in some much needed cash.

In 1913, the company first used the trade name Velocette for a small two stroke motorcycle invented by Percy, and the name was then used for many later cycles as well. Production was halted by the outbreak of the First World War and the factory was turned over to the production of munitions for the war effort.

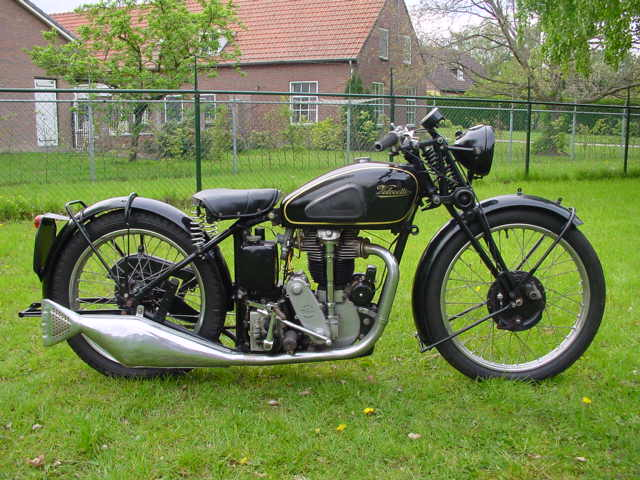
Velocette KSS 350 1947

In 1916 Eugene's car making business failed and he joined Veloce, the family firm.

After the war the company name was changed to Velocette as this had become a recognised brand. In 1925 Goodman had a breakthrough when his 348cc overhead cam prototype was entered in the Isle of Man TT, which was one of the most famous road races of the time and a great 'proving ground' for motorcycle manufacturers. In 1926 Alec Bennet won the TT on a Velocette KTT. For the next forty-five years a series of very successful motorcycles followed. In 1971 rising development costs and the owners' racing expenses took their toll on the company's bottom line and they went into voluntary liquidation.
