= Velocette LE =

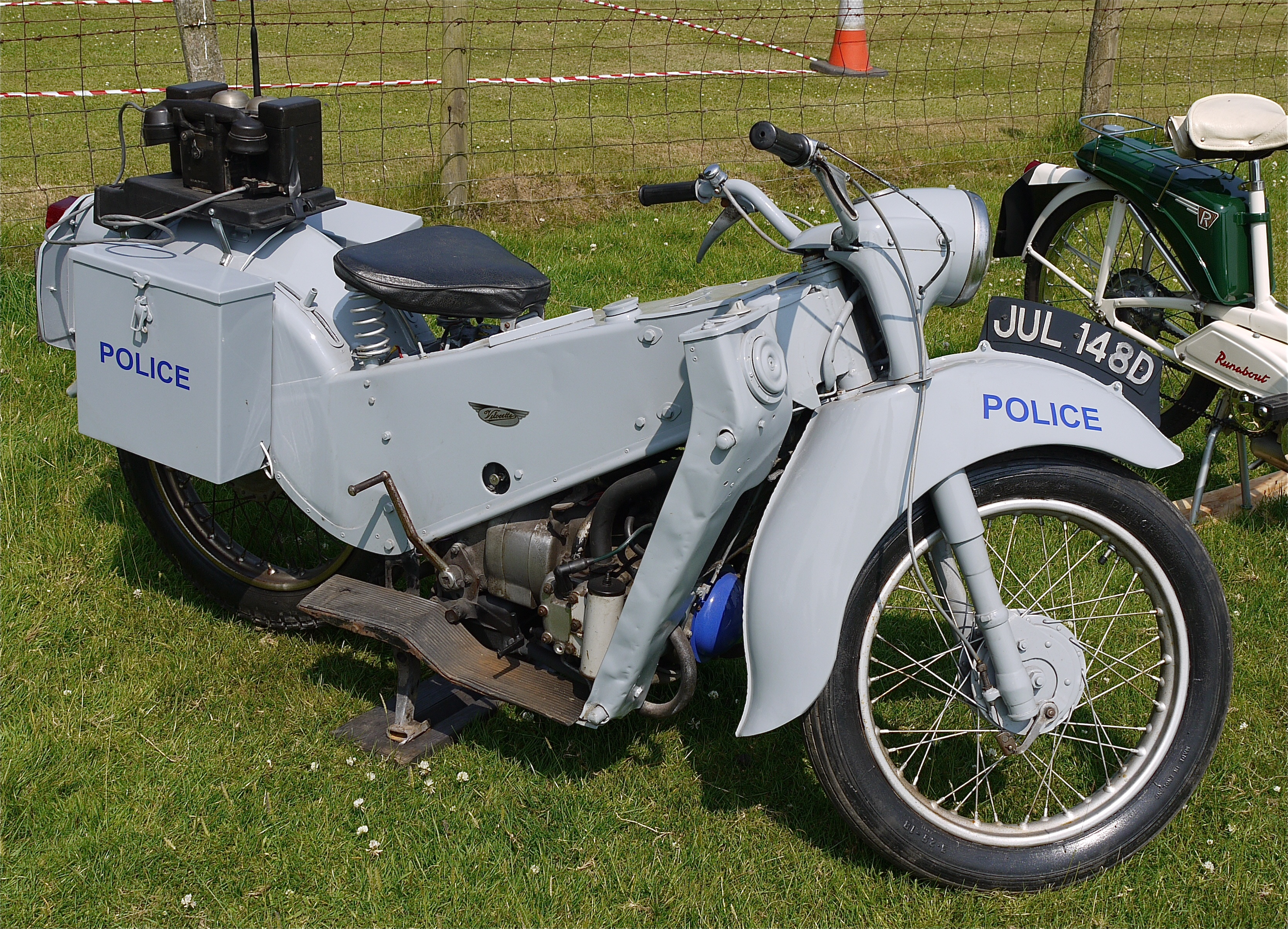
- Manufacturer: Velocette
- Also called: "Noddy Bike"
- Production: 1948–1971
- Engine: MkI 149 cc (9.1 cu in) four-stroke, water-cooled, horizontally opposed twin MkII 200 cc (12 cu in)
- Top speed: 50 mph (80 km/h)
- Power: MkI 149 cc 6 bhp (4.5 kW) @ 5,000 rpm Mk II 200 cc 8 bhp (6.0 kW) @ 5,000 rpm
- Transmission: MkI & MkII three-speed gearbox to shaft final drive MkIII four-speed gearbox
- Suspension: Telescopic front forks, swinging arm rear
- Brakes: 5 in (130 mm) front and rear
- Tyres: MkI 3.00x19, Mk II & III 3.25x18
- Seat height: 710 mm (28 in)
- Weight: 120 kg (260 lb) (dry)
- Fuel capacity: 5.7 L (1.3 imp gal; 1.5 US gal)
- Oil capacity: 1 L (0.22 imp gal; 0.26 US gal) wet sump

The Velocette LE is a motorcycle made by Veloce Ltd from 1948 to 1971. The designation LE stood for "little engine". Used by over fifty British Police forces, the police riders became known as "Noddies" because they were required to nod to senior officers, and the LE was nicknamed "the Noddy Bike". Production ended in 1970 when the company ran into financial problems and went into voluntary liquidation.

== The Mk I LE ==
Velocette's Director, Eugene Goodman, planned an innovative and radical design that would appeal to a new market that needed cheap, clean and reliable transport. Designers Charles Udall and Phil Irving developed the Velocette LE as a "conceived-as-a-whole" design, with engine, gearbox, drive shaft and bevel box in a single unit to do a specific job.

The Velocette LE was launched at the British International Motor Show at Earls Court in 1948 as the "Motorcycle for Everyman". With a 149 cc four-stroke, side-valve, water-cooled, horizontally opposed twin-cylinder engine, the LE also had a radiator and was fitted with coil ignition to help starting. The hand change three-speed gearbox, engine and clutch were contained in special castings, and final drive was by a shaft mounted in a swing frame with adjustable suspension. Aluminium leg shields were designed to keep the rain off, and footboards gave it a scooter feel.

The only instrument was a speedometer. To reduce noise and vibration the pressed steel frame was lined with soundproofing felt. The water-cooled engine was well silenced, and riders reported that sometimes they only knew the engine was running by checking the ignition light. Carrying capacity was boosted by a glove compartment in front of the petrol tank. All this made the MkI LE expensive, however, at £126 compared with the BSA Bantam at £76. The odd looks also meant that it did not appeal to the usual motorcycle buyer.

== Mk II LE ==
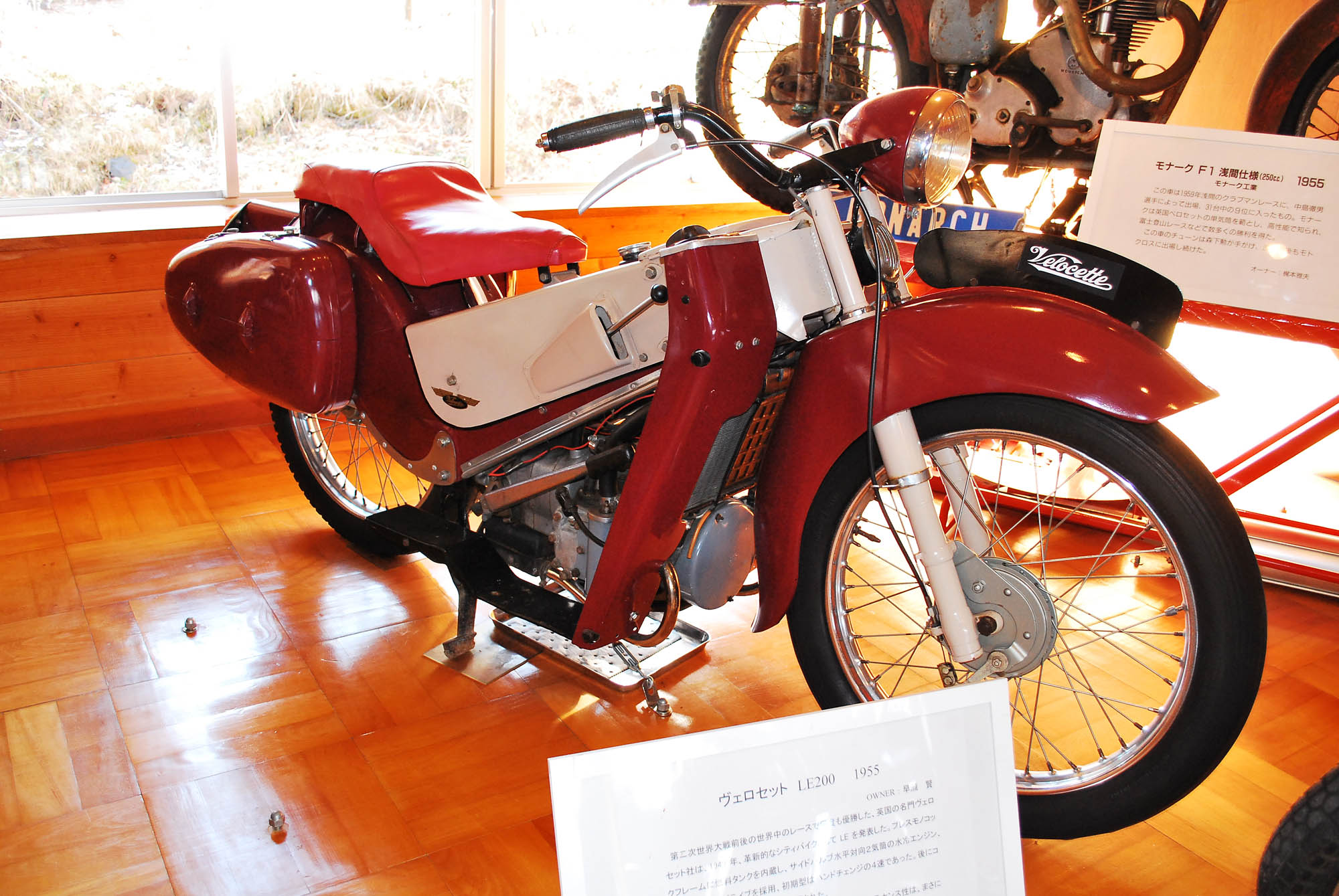
1955 Mk II

Launched in 1951 the Mk II had a 192 cc (11.7 cu in) engine, giving an extra 2 hp (1.5 kW), and strengthened bearings. Sales remained poor, however, and the company had to reduce the price. The clutch was upgraded, and an Amal 363 monobloc carburetor replaced the standard unit. The rear swinging arm was uprated with cast aluminium to improve rigidity, and the brakes were improved.

A breakthrough for Velocette was when over fifty British police forces decided to use the LE for patrols and ordered more than half the production. Ex-police machines can be identified by the aftermarket fittings for the police radio. These include the manufacturer's data plate being moved to the headstock, the word 'POLICE' stamped under the generator cover and a distinctive V-shaped pressing riveted in front of the seat. This was designed to keep rainwater out of the battery compartment.

== The Noddy name ==
Metropolitan Police officers of the time were trained to salute an inspector or above, but when riding the Velocette LE this meant taking one hand from the handle bars, so it was agreed that instead they could nod to show respect. The police riders therefore became known as "Noddies", and the LE was nicknamed "the Noddy Bike"; this nickname does not appear to have had anything to do with Enid Blyton's eponymous character.

== The Mk III LE ==
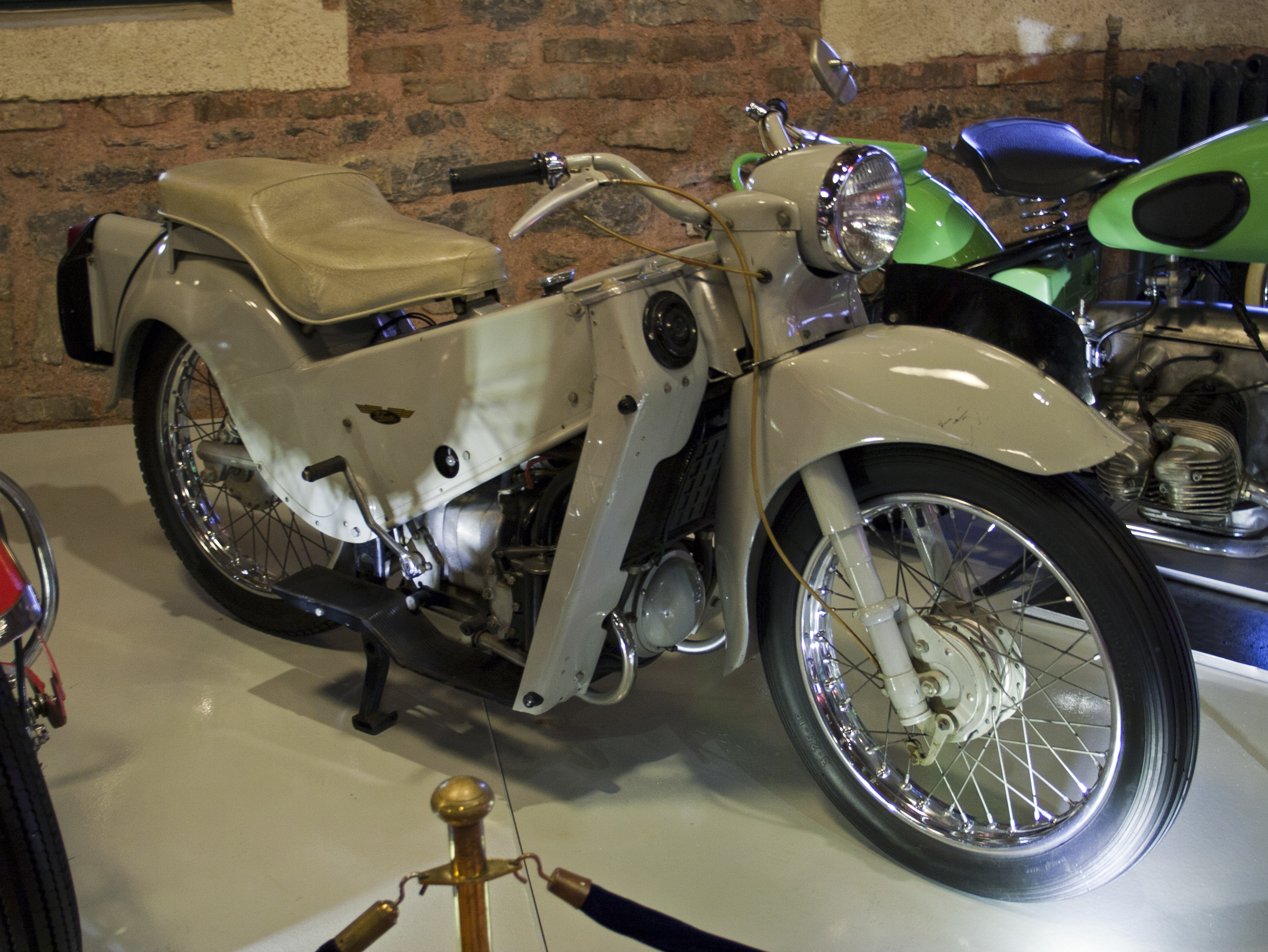
1958 Mk III Velocette LE

In 1958, Velocette launched the Mk III LE with a foot-operated gear change and a conventional kick start. An extra gear was added, together with 18-inch-diameter (460 mm) wheels. The instrumentation was relocated to the head lamp, and the petrol capacity was increased from a meagre 1.25 to 1.62 imperial gallons (5.7 to 7.4 L; 1.50 to 1.95 US gal).

With ten years' development, the Velocette LE was more reliable and practical, but on 3 February 1971, the company went into voluntary liquidation. The very last motorcycles made in the Veloce factory were LEs. Production of other motorcycles had been delayed or cancelled to produce the LE in various forms, and the lucrative police orders had dried up with the introduction of the "panda car" for patrol use by most forces. Kent County Constabulary purchased the remaining spare parts and were able to keep LEs running until 1974.
