= Close-ratio transmission =

A close-ratio transmission describes a motor vehicle transmission with a smaller than average difference between the gear ratios. They are most often used on sports cars in order to keep the engine in the power band.

== Overview ==
A close-ratio transmission is one which is described relative to another transmission for the same vehicle model. The relativity applies only for the transmissions offered for a single make and model; that is, there is no specific threshold value or accepted industry standard that determines whether the steps between gears constitute a normal or close-ratio transmission. What one manufacturer describes as a close-ratio transmission is not necessarily closer in ratios than another manufacturer's normal manual transmission.

Often, manufacturers use the term "close-ratio" when offering one or more alternatives to the transmission fitted as standard equipment: for example, an optional, sportier transmission which offers closer ratios than the standard, such as Porsche offered with the three transmissions listed below for the 911 from 1967 to 1971.

Mathematically, the "closeness" of a transmission can be characterized from the cumulative average spacing between, or geometric average of, gears. This is defined as the (n−1)th root of the products of each gear ratio, which simplifies to the overall range of gear ratios and the number of (forward) speeds:

$$\overline{\mathrm{spacing}} \equiv \left( \prod_{i=1}^{n-1} \frac{R_{i+1}}{R_i} \right)^\frac{1}{n-1} =\sqrt[{n-1}]{\frac{R_{n}}{R_{1}}} =\sqrt[{n-1}]{\frac{R_{hi}}{R_{lo}}}$$

where

- $R_{n} = R_{hi}$ is the gear ratio of the highest gear
- $R_{1} = R_{lo}$ is the gear ratio of the lowest gear
- $n$ is the total number of (forward) gear speeds

In general, most transmissions have approximately the same total range between the highest and lowest gears, so the more gears a transmission has, the closer they are together. This is apparent from the expression above: as $n$ increases, the average spacing will increase. A continuously variable transmission (CVT) has a nearly infinite "number" of gear ratios between its highest and lowest ratios, which means the CVT has infinitesimally small steps between gear ratios. However, because CVTs do not have specific (fixed) gear ratios unless programmed as such, it would not be considered a close-ratioed transmission.

=== Engine power band considerations ===
Internal combustion engines found in passenger automobiles are capable of operating over a relatively wide range of speeds: idle to redline for petrol engines is approximately 700 to 6500 RPM or more; however, the power band, which is the optimum range of engine speeds considering fuel consumption, torque, and power output, is usually smaller. The automotive transmission is used to maintain the engine speed within the power band while operating the vehicle over a wide range of legal speeds.

During acceleration, when the vehicle's speed increases to the point that the engine speed exceeds the speed at which maximum power is developed, the driver or transmission shifts to a higher gear (numerically lower ratio), which reduces engine speed, keeping it in its optimum power band, and allows continued acceleration. It is possible for the next higher gear ratio to be so much lower than the preceding ratio that upshifting lowers the engine speed excessively, resulting in the engine speed falling outside its "power band"; for maximum acceleration, the engine speed of an automobile should be kept in this power band. A wide-ratio transmission requires the engine to operate over a greater range of engine speeds, but requires less shifting and allows a wider range of output (vehicle) speeds.

High-performance engines often are tuned for maximum power in an even more narrow range of operating speeds. A close-ratio type of transmission is designed to allow an engine to remain in this relatively narrow range of operating speeds and generally are offered in sports cars, in which the driver can be expected to enjoy shifting often to keep the engine in its power band.

== Example (Porsche 911) ==
Ratios of three Porsche 911 5-speed manual transmissions (1967–1971)
Gear	Ratio					
Gear	Standard (901/75)		Hill Climb (901/76)		Nürburgring (901/79)	
Gear	Value	Step	Value	Step	Value	Step
1st	2.643	—N/a	2.833	—N/a	2.643	—N/a
2nd	1.778	67%	2.000	71%	1.600	61%
3rd	1.318	74%	1.550	78%	1.318	82%
4th	1.000	76%	1.318	85%	1.080	82%
5th	0.821	82%	1.217	92%	0.926	86%
Avg Step	74.7%		81%		76.9%	
Overall change	0.31		0.43		0.35	

This table compares the ratios of three transmissions offered for Porsche 911 vehicles from 1967 to 1971, the first being the standard 901/75 transmission, the second being the 901/76 transmission denoted "For hill climbs", and the third being the 901/79 transmission denoted "Nürburgring ratios". It includes the step between successive ratios; for example, the step from 3rd to 4th gear for the 901/76 transmission is 85%, meaning the engine speed in 4th gear is 85% of that in 3rd gear at equivalent vehicle speeds.

For the standard Porsche transmission (901/75) described here, each successive gear's ratio is, on average, 75% of that of the preceding gear:

$$\left( \frac{0.821}{2.643} \right)^\frac{1}{4} = 0.747$$

By similar calculations, the Hill Climb transmission has successive gear ratios which are 81% of the preceding gear, on average, and the Nürburgring transmission has successive gear ratios which are 77% of the preceding gear. Thus, the Hill Climb transmission's gears are "closer" in numerical ratio to the preceding gear than that of the standard or Nürburgring transmission, making it a close-ratio transmission.

Note the step from 1st to 2nd for the Nürburgring transmission is the largest single change for any of the three transmissions, but the successive step changes from 2nd through 5th are relatively small; this transmission is intended for sustained high-speed operation instead of acceleration from a stop.

=== Power band ===
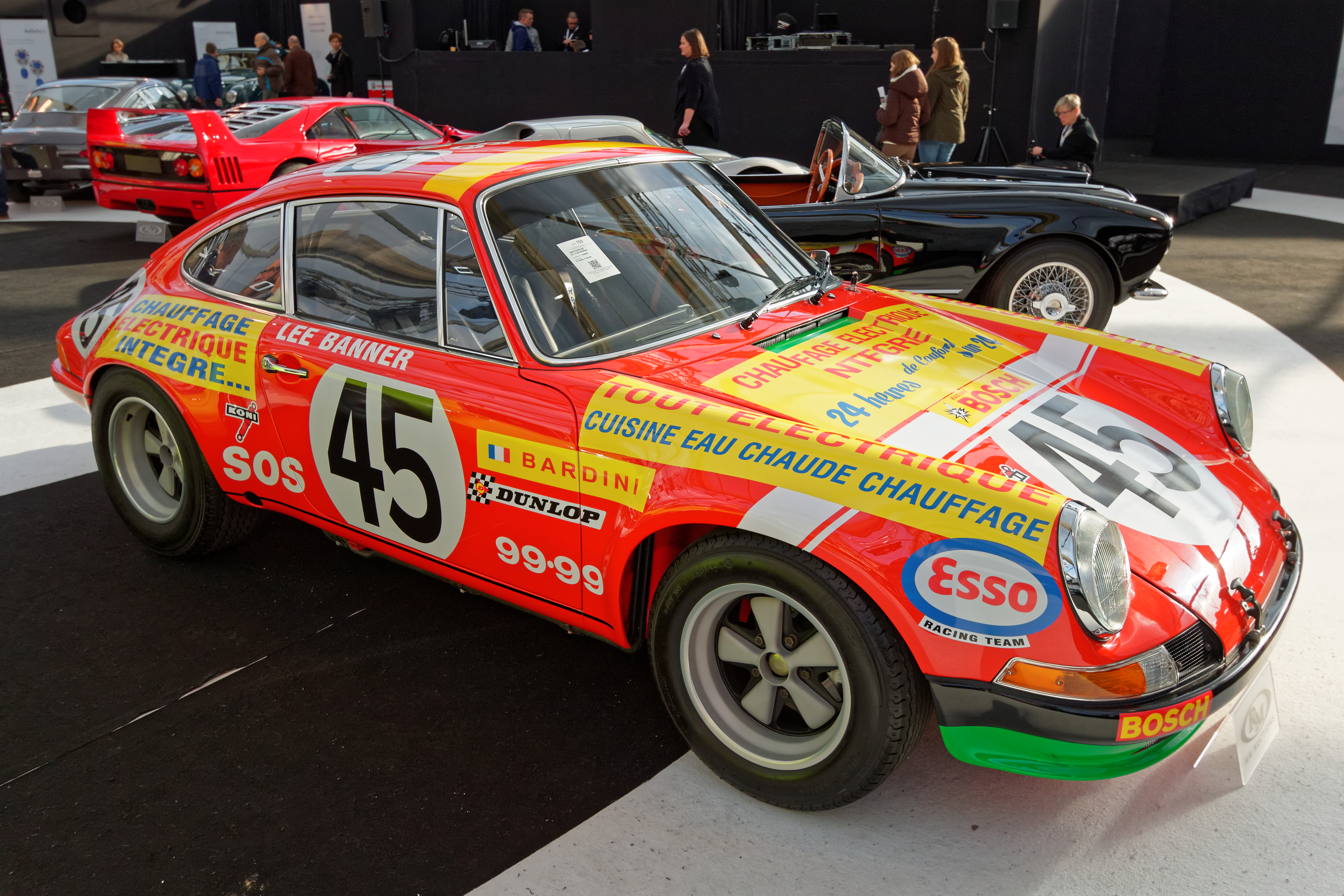
1969 Porsche 911 S

The 1967 Porsche 911 S was equipped with a 2.0 L flat-six engine which produced 160 hp (120 kW) at 6600/min and 179 N⋅m (132 lbf⋅ft) of torque at 5200/min. Using the Standard transmission gear ratios above, when the driver shifts from 2nd to 3rd gear at 6,600/min, the engine speed would fall to 4890/min (which is 6600 × 1.32 / 1.78). In this case, shifting up to 3rd gear causes the engine speed to be slightly below the speed at which maximum torque is produced. By using a close-ratio gearbox, such as the Hill Climb example above, shifting to 3rd gear would drop engine speed to 5120/min (6600 × 1.55 / 2.00), which almost coincides with the maximum torque output of the engine.

Likewise, the Nürburgring gearset above is also slightly numerically closer than the Standard gearset, making it more useful for sporting applications. However, the Nürburgring specification has a "taller" (numerically lower) 5th gear ratio than the Hill Climb gearbox, allowing for higher top speeds necessary for this faster racing circuit.

The Standard gearset with its numerically lower 5th gear, will allow even lower engine speeds at highway speeds, thereby reducing engine noise and fuel consumption, but compromises acceleration performance at very high speeds.

== Historical evolution ==
Ratios of Muncie and Borg-Warner 4-speed manual transmissions
Gear	Muncie						Borg-Warner Super T-10							
Gear	M20 (1963–65)		M20 (1966–74)		M21 & M22		(1974–77)		(1977–79)		(1979–81)		(1980–82)	
Gear	Ratio	Step	Ratio	Step	Ratio	Step	Ratio	Step	Ratio	Step	Ratio	Step	Ratio	Step
1st	2.56	—N/a	2.52	—N/a	2.20	—N/a	2.43	—N/a	2.64	—N/a	2.88	—N/a	3.42	—N/a
2nd	1.91	75%	1.88	75%	1.64	75%	1.61	66%	1.75	66%	1.91	66%	2.28	67%
3rd	1.48	77%	1.46	78%	1.28	78%	1.23	76%	1.34	77%	1.33	70%	1.46	64%
4th	1.00	68%	1.00	68%	1.00	78%	1.00	81%	1.00	75%	1.00	75%	1.00	68%
Avg Step	73.1%		73.5%		76.9%		74.4%		72.4%		70.3%		66.4%	
Overall	0.39		0.4		0.45		0.41		0.38		0.35		0.29	

In the 1960s, cars equipped with manual transmissions typically had four forward speeds and a top gear offering a 1:1 ratio. The designation of wide versus close ratio affected the lowest gear ratio; for example, the four-speed Muncie transmissions offered in General Motors performance vehicles included the M20 "wide ratio" transmission, which had a first gear ratio of 2.52 or 2.56:1, while the M21 and M22 "close ratio" transmissions had a first gear ratio of 2.20:1.

At that time, fuel efficiency was not a primary concern and the "close ratio" transmissions generally were paired with a low final drive ratio of 3.5:1 or higher to compensate for the relatively high lowest gear ratio, resulting in a large rate of fuel consumption. Following the oil crises of the 1970s, final drive ratios went to 3:1 or lower to improve fuel economy and to accommodate this, vehicle manufacturers began adding more forward speeds into the gearbox, typically pairing an overdrive fifth with an even lower first gear, resulting in what would have been considered a very wide ratio transmission. "Close ratio" transmissions now had low gear ratios of 2.64:1 while "wide ratio" transmissions were 3:1 or higher, meaning that "close ratio" transmissions produced in the 1970s often had a larger range of ratios than "wide ratio" transmissions from the 1960s!

=== Adding gear ratios ===
Ratios of three Honda manual transmissions
Gear	Civic (1978)		NSX (1991)		Civic Type R (2019)	
Gear	Ratio	Step	Ratio	Step	Ratio	Step
1st	3.181	—N/a	3.071	—N/a	3.625	—N/a
2nd	1.823	57%	1.727	56%	2.115	58%
3rd	1.181	65%	1.230	71%	1.529	72%
4th	0.846	72%	0.967	79%	1.125	74%
5th	—N/a		0.771	80%	0.911	81%
6th	—N/a				0.735	81%
Avg Step	64.3%		70.8%		72.7%	
Overall	0.27		0.25		0.2	

One way to create a close-ratio transmission is to install more gears into the transmission without altering the lowest and highest gear ratios. In this manner, some six-speed transmissions available in consumer vehicles are labelled as "close-ratio". Again, the defining issue is the overall spacing of gears between 1st and in this case 6th gear. As an example, consider three manual transmissions fitted to Honda cars, each with an overall change in ratios ($\frac{R_{hi}}{R_{lo}}$) of 0.2 to 0.3, but with a different number of gears; the six-speed transmission has closer ratios than the four-speed transmission.

Whether a six-speed transmission can be legitimately called "close-ratio" depends on whether it keeps the top gear unchanged relative to that of a comparable 5-speed model, thus causing the change in ratios from low to high gear to occur in smaller steps (i.e. closer ratios) between gears. Alternatively, some six-speed transmissions have ratios essentially the same as a 5-speed transmission, and add an even higher (numerically lower) 6th gear that allows even lower engine speeds at highway speeds. In this case, the transmission would be considered a "double" overdrive transmission, depending upon the 5th and 6th gear ratios.

By extension, an automatic transmission could also be called close-ratioed. With the advent of 6-, 7-, and 8-speed automatic transmissions, the ratios become closer and closer together, which meets the mathematical conception of what constitutes a close-ratio transmission.

=== Continuously Variable Transmissions (CVT) ===
Prior to the 1970s, manufacturers' manual transmissions generally had three or four gears. To meet requirements to maximize fuel economy, manufacturers began offering 5- and, in the 1990s, 6- speed manual transmissions. Likewise, 3-speed automatic transmissions were the norm until fairly recently, but now 6-, 7-, and 8-speed automatic transmissions are being offered.

By reducing the spacing between ratios allowed by having more gears, a vehicle's engine speed can be kept in a narrow band. With a 5-speed transmission, the power range must be relatively wide, which requires compromising the engine's efficiency. With an 8-speed transmission, the power range can be kept relatively narrow, which allows the engineer to optimize engine efficiency at a particular engine speed, and the transmission attempts to keep the engine operating at that speed.

(Engine efficiency improves greatly when the load on the engine is maximized; hence, automatic transmissions also upshift whenever possible in an attempt to lower the engine's speed as much as possible, which increases load and efficiency.)

The recent introduction of continuously variable transmissions (CVTs) attempts to push this strategy to its logical conclusion. This allows a near infinite "number" of gear ratios, which this implies an infinitely close-ratioed transmission. However, given that there are no gears or specific gear ratios, one would not really consider such a transmission close-ratioed.
