= Velocette Viceroy =

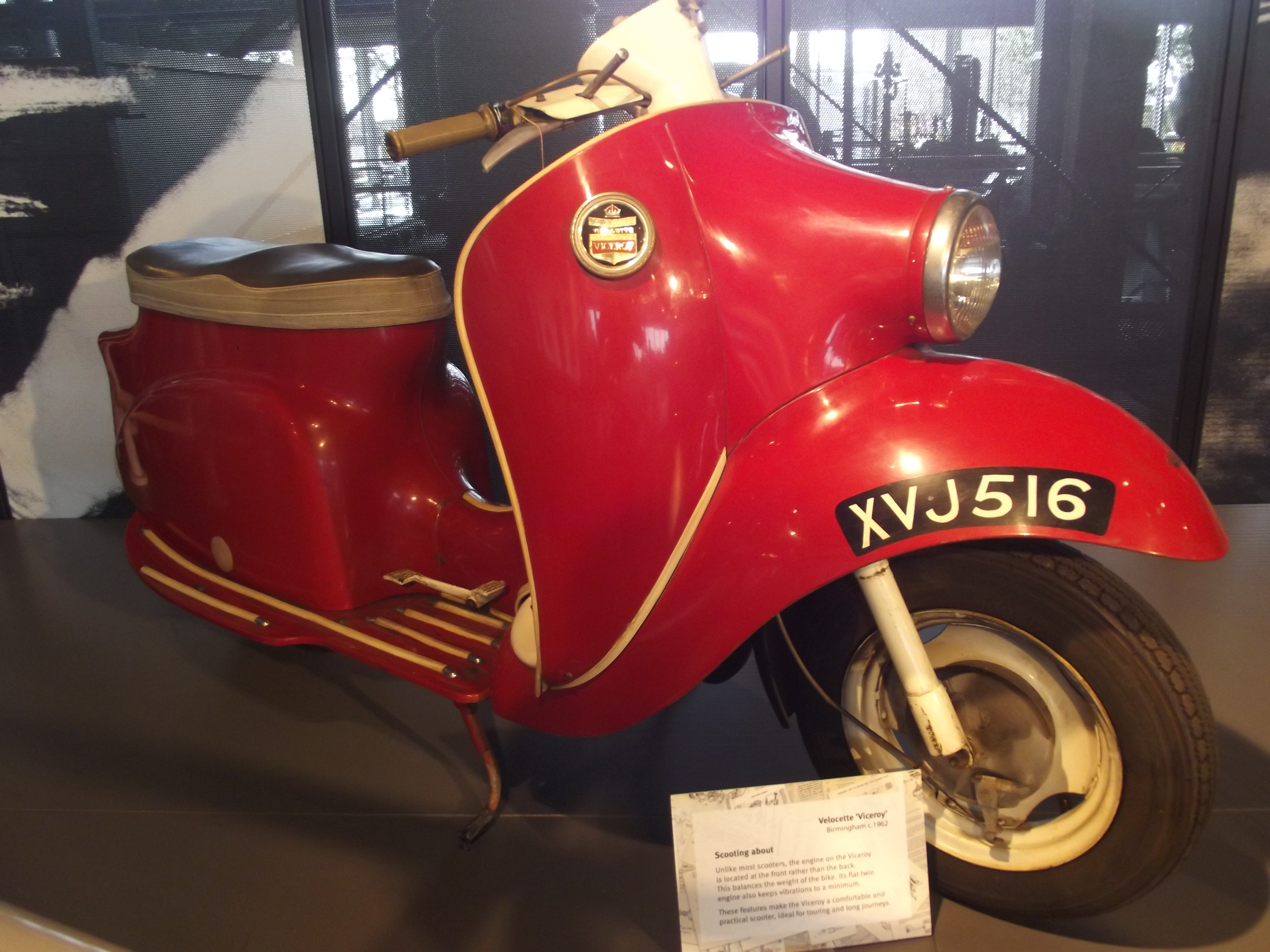
- The Velocette Viceroy scooter displayed at Thinktank, Birmingham Science Museum
- Manufacturer: Veloce ltd.

The Viceroy is a scooter introduced by the British motorcycle manufacturer Veloce Ltd in 1960. Only 700 were sold before the model was discontinued in 1964. The Viceroy was considered an unusual design, as the transverse two-stroke horizontally opposed twin cylinder 250cc engine had reed valve induction: probably a first on a production two wheel machine, and the engine was placed at the front of the scooter.
