= Velocette MSS =

Motorcycle

- Manufacturer: Velocette
- Production: 1935–68
- Successor: Venom
- Engine: 495cc, OHV air-cooled single
- Bore / stroke: 1935-1939 81.0 mm × 96 mm (3.19 in × 3.78 in) 1954 onwards 86 mm x 86 mm
- Top speed: 80 mph (130 km/h)
- Power: 23 bhp (17 kW) @ 5000rpm
- Transmission: Four-speed, chain final drive
- Brakes: Drum
- Weight: 375 pounds (170 kg) (dry)
- Fuel capacity: 2.5 gallons

The Velocette MSS is a motorcycle made by the Birmingham, UK based Veloce Ltd, better known as Velocette. The model was introduced in 1935 as a sports machine in the 500cc class, and continued in production through 1968, which several significant changes to the chassis and engine over its production run. While the MSS was a sports machine in the 1930s, by the 1950s it was better known as a touring motorcycle and sidecar hauler.

== Development ==
The MSS was introduced in 1935 as a sports machine in the 500cc class. The chassis of the MSS from 1935-54 was a simple triangulated full-loop rigid frame shared with the overhead-camshaft 350cc KSS model, and Webb girder forks. The MSS engine was an enlarged version of the high-camshaft pushrod overhead-valve engine design developed by Veloce with assistance from Australian designer Phil Irving, originally introduced as the 250cc MOV model for the 1934 season. The success of the MOV as a lightweight sporting motorcycle inspired the creation of the 350cc MAC model (with the same cylinder bore as the MOV but a longer stroke), and finally the MSS. The M series of pushrod OHV models was developed as a less-expensive alternative to the OHC K series models, which were required skilled labor to assemble properly: the pushrod engines were much simpler to assemble correctly. As suggested by the 'SS', the MSS was originally intended as a super-sports model to rival the sporting KSS, with similar performance and a near-identical chassis (although the KSS used a 21" front wheel, the MSS 19"). Production continued after WW2, with the addition in 1948 of Dowty Oleomatic telescopic forks, and by Veloce's own design of telescopic for in 1951. For 1954, the MSS was installed in a new swingarm chassis, and the engine redesigned with a 'square' bore/stroke and an aluminum alloy cylinder head. After the introduction of the sporting Venom model in 1955, the MSS, with its modest state of engine tuning, was better known for touring and sidecar hauling. Demand for the MSS waned in the 1960s with the industry trend towards super-sports motorcycles, and production ended in 1968, three years before all Velocette production ceased in 1971.

== Racing history ==
A Scrambler variant of the MSS was introduced in 1954, intended primarily for the American market to support the popularity of off-road competition. The MSS Scrambler is noted by engine serial numbers MSS xxx S, in the same swingarm frame as the standard MSS, but with double-damped telescopic forks, aluminum alloy fenders, and a smaller fuel tank. The cylinder head had larger valves, a new camshaft, and breathed through an Amal TT carburetor: this engine configuration subsequently was used the Venom model, with near 100mph performance.

Burt Munro from New Zealand, featured in the film The World's Fastest Indian raced a heavily modified 1936 Velocette MSS. Racing preparation included making special pistons, changing the frame and increasing engine capacity to 650 cc. His top speed record on this motorcycle was 138 mph (222 km/h) with a 1/4 mile time of 12.31 seconds.
