= AJS V4 =

Racing motorcycle

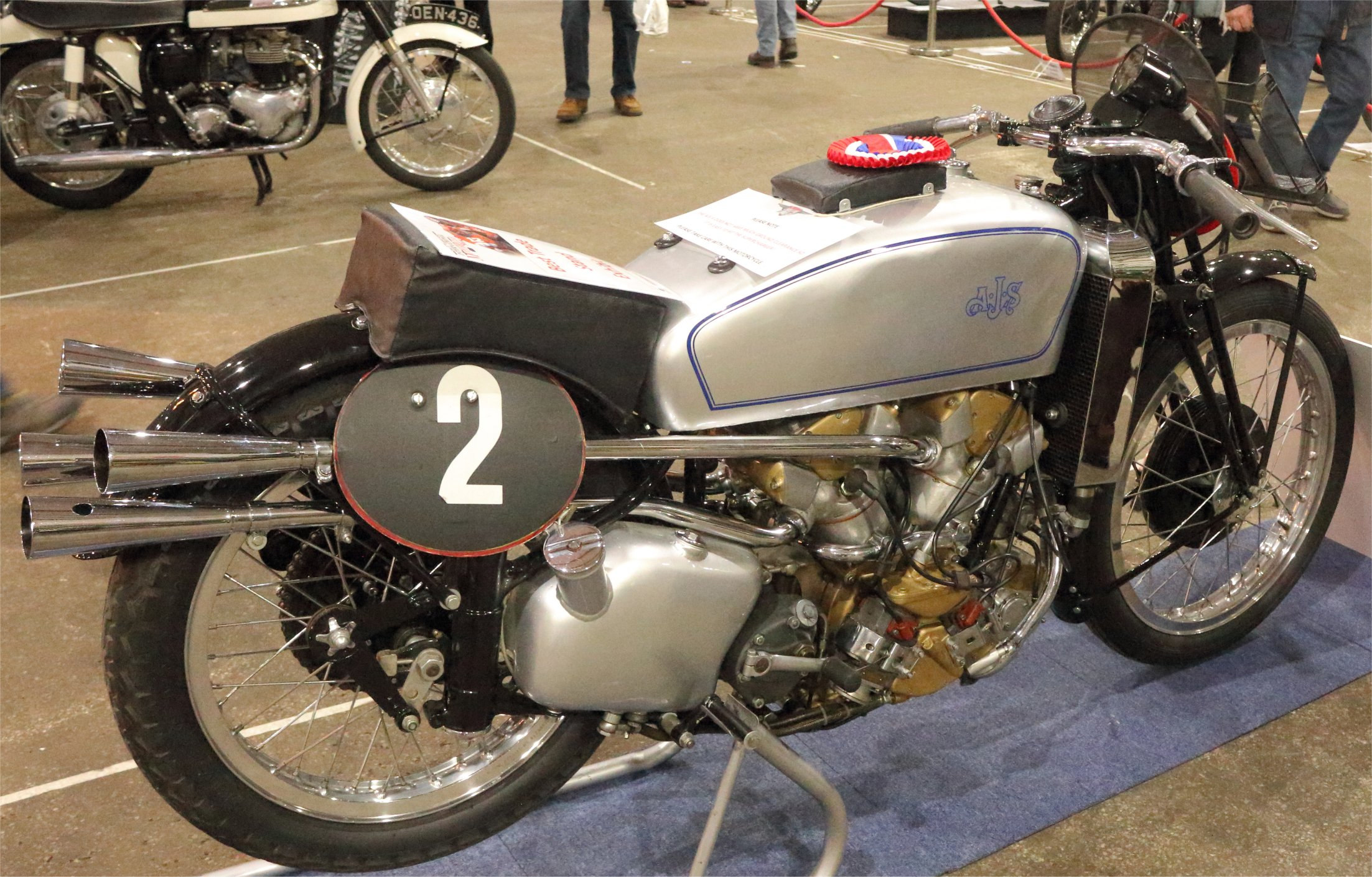
1939 AJS V4 racer restored by the museum owned by Sammy Miller at the 2017 Stafford Classic Motorcycle Show

The AJS V4 (1935 – 1939) started out as a prototype air-cooled V4 road bike, but became a water-cooled and supercharged racing bike.

== The 1935 Olympia Show bike ==
In 1935, at the Olympia Show, the Bert Collier designed air-cooled 495cc sohc AJS 50° V4 was first displayed. It was a fully equipped road going version, which did not make it into production. This first version used a common crankcase with four individual cast iron cylinders and separate alloy heads, with exposed hairpin valve springs, and a 180° crankshaft with forked conrods. There was a central carburettor for each pair of cylinders, and fore and aft exhausts. The single overhead camshafts were chain driven. It had chain primary drive in an oil bath primary chain-case, and a wet clutch. It was stated by AJS at the time that there would be the option of replacing the forward mounted chain driven dynamo with a supercharger. The AJS used a rigid frame with girder forks.

== The 1936 racer ==
In the spring of 1936 a new racing version with alloy barrels appeared at Brooklands for testing, wearing a Zoller supercharger, driven at half engine speed, and fed by a single Amal TT carburettor. The ERA GP cars of the time used a larger Zoller supercharger. It made 51.5 bhp (38.4 kW) at 6000 rpm. All exhaust ports now faced forward, and a branched inlet manifold fed the engine with 8 psi (0,55 bar) of boost. The engine was now mounted in the same frame as the 500 cc OHC single TT racers, and used a four-speed Burman gearbox with a dry clutch.

In 1936 Harold Daniell and George Rowley rode the AJS supercharged V4s in the Isle of Man Senior TT, but despite its high top speed, it lacked acceleration. Both riders retired due to mechanical problems.

== The 1938 racer ==
Considerable work must have been done at the new AMC race shop, because the next version did not appear until 1938 and, when it did, it had a plunger rear suspension, better brakes, revised and lighter induction manifold, and raised compression. The engine had been mounted further back in the frame to improve rear cylinder cooling. A R (Bob) Foster rode one in the 1938 Senior Isle of Man TT, but it retired, from overheating, after only two laps.

== The water-cooled 1939 AJS V4 racer ==
Where other companies might have cut their losses at this point, AMC did not. They commissioned Matt Wright, former New Imperial designer, to do a complete redesign.

The result was a water-cooled version with barrels and cylinder heads cast in pairs, and fitted with enclosed valves. All exhaust ports now faced rearwards. Initially a thermo siphon design with a radiator on each side of the front frame downtubes, an impeller type water pump was soon added to the left side of the crankshaft to further aid cooling. Supercharger boost was reduced to 6 psi (0,4 bar). Instead of the previous pressure lubrication, oil was now added to the fuel. The new duplex frame had integral rear plunger suspension housings, and the Webb-type girder forks were now graced with a deep finned alloy 8-inch (200 mm) TLS front brake. The bike used a 21-inch (530 mm) front tyre, and a 19-inch (480 mm) rear. It had a six imperial gallon (27 L) fuel tank.

In May 1939 A R (Bob) Foster entered one in the North West 200, but it flooded on the start line.

At the 1939 Isle of Man TT two bikes, ridden by Walter Rusk and A R (Bob) Foster, were 11th and 13th in the Senior TT and the supercharged BMW 492cc Type 255 Kompressor of Georg Meier and Jock M West took the first two places. Though capable of high speeds, the AJS V4s did not handle well, and blew head gaskets in practice.

At the 1939 Ulster GP, the last GP before the War, the two bikes led from the start against Nortons and a supercharged four-cylinder Gilera, but halfway round the first of the 14-mile (23 km) laps, already timed at 135 mph (217 km/h) on one section, A R (Bob) Foster retired with plug trouble. Rusk completed the first lap at a record breaking average of 100.03 mph (160.98 km/h) and a lead of 34 seconds. On the third lap a fork link broke forcing retirement. It is believed that this was caused by mistaken fitment of a 7R fork link instead of the stronger V4 part during servicing.

In 1939 the 405 lb (184 kg). dry sump V4 was the first bike to lap the Ulster Grand Prix course at over 100 mph (160 km/h). Then World War II intervened.

In June 1946, the AJS V4 finally won, at Chimay in Belgium, ridden by the same Jock M West who had defeated the AJS on a BMW in the TT before the War, and was now AJS Sales Manager. Walter Rusk did not survive the War, and Jock's mount was the bike Rusk had ridden. A week later at Albi, France, Jock West was in the lead when a crankpin seized and locked. When Sammy Miller acquired the engine from Jock West thirty years later to rebuild the AJS V4 for his museum, he found the crankpin still seized.

The engine used by Walter Rusk in the Ulster GP, with 7.9:1 compression and 16.5 lbf/in^{2} (114 kPa) of boost, made 55 bhp (41 kW) at 7200 rpm on a dynamometer.

AJS was already developing another supercharged engine, the AJS Porcupine, but, three months after the Albi race, the FIM banned all forms of forced induction for motorcycle racing.

Motor Cycle News reported that the 'Sammy Miller' machine was refurbished and ran during August, 1979 "for the first time since it seized in Albi, France in 1946".
