= Karl Gall =

Austrian motorcycle racer

Karl Gall (27 October 1903, in Vienna, Austria-Hungary – 13 June 1939, in Ramsey) was an Austrian motorcycle racer with the works BMW motor-cycle team and a former German national motor-cycle champion.

== Biography ==
Along with his two brothers Franz and Adolf, as youngest of three racing brothers, Gall began his motor-cycle racing career in 1924 in Austria. In a serious accident at the 1930 German Grand Prix, Gall suffered a serious fracture to the hand which prevented him from racing. First as a contracted works BMW rider from 1927, then contracted to Standard Fahrzeugfabrik GmbH motor-cycles company of Ludwigsburg from 1929 to 1933 and from 1936 onwards, he returned to BMW to develop the 500c BMW Type 255 Kompressor racing motor-cycle. In 1937, Gall won the 500cc class at the Dutch TT at the Circuit van Drenthe, Assen and the German Grand Prix at the Sachsenring in which the works Norton rider Jimmie Guthrie died in a racing accident. Riding the BMW Type 255 Kompressor, he also won the 1937 German National Championship.

Display: 1939 Memorial Urn – Karl Gall. Racing Lines Exhibition Manx National Heritage (Summer 2018).

For the 1938 Isle of Man TT, Gall was entered by the BMW team along with Jock West and Georg Meier. First the BMW team suffered a setback when Gall was badly injured in an unofficial practice crash and was found unconscious in a ditch above the Gooseneck and was unable to race due to head injuries and a broken arm. On the startline for the 1938 Senior TT Race, one of the BMW mechanics changing a spark-plug stripped a cylinder thread on the engine of Georg Meier's BMW Type 255 Kompressor motor-cycle. Despite starting the 1938 Senior TT Race on one-cylinder, Meier retired on lap 1 at the bottom of Bray Hill leaving the works Norton rider Harold Daniell to win the race.

During practice for the 1939 Isle of Man TT on 2 June 1939, Gall crashed on the first lap of evening practice while trying to overtake the works Norton rider Freddie Frith on the approach to Ballaugh Bridge. After being conveyed by ambulance to Ramsey Cottage Hospital due to severe head injuries, Gall died on 13 June 1939 due to his injuries and the effects of pneumonia in hospital. After considering to withdraw from the Isle of Man TT Races, the BMW management decided that Meier and West would compete in the 1939 Senior TT Race and Meier led from start to finish winning at an average race speed of 89.38 mph and Jock West finished in second place.

Near to Ballaugh Bridge on the Isle of Man TT Mountain Course a nearby road-side memorial commemorates the racing career of Gall.
