= Omobono Tenni =

Italian motorcycle racer

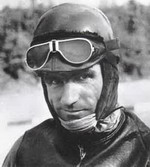
- Nationality: Italian
- Born: July 24, 1905; Tirano, Italy
- Died: July 1, 1948 (aged 42); Bern, Switzerland
Motorcycle racing career statistics
Isle of Man TT career
TTs contested	4 (1935, 1937, 1939, 1948)
TT wins	1
First TT win	1937 Lightweight TT
Last TT win	1937 Lightweight TT
TT podiums	1

Tommaso Omobono Tenni (July 24, 1905 – July 1, 1948) was an Italian motorcycle road racer. Nicknamed The Black Devil, he was a two-times Grand Prix motorcycle European champion, who raced to 47 victories for Moto Guzzi from 1933 till 1948, the year he died from an accident during practice for the Bern Grand Prix.

== Early years ==
Omobono Tenni was born in Tirano, Lombardy. When he was 15, his family moved to Treviso, where he began an apprenticeship at a motorcycle workshop. At 19, he opened his own workshop and began his racing career. His first victory was in 1924, at the end of his teenage years. It was not until 1931 that members of his local club contributed so that he could purchase a Velocette 350 with which he finished in third place at the Italian Grand Prix at Monza followed by a victory at the Grand Prix Reale of Rome.

== Moto Guzzi ==
In 1932, Tenni won a race at Rapallo against Moto Guzzi's star rider, Pietro Ghersi. His performance earned him a spot on the Moto Guzzi team for the 1933 season. For the 1934 season, Moto Guzzi developed a new V twin 500 cc racer and Tenni rode it to victory at the Italian Grand Prix ahead of his teammate Stanley Woods. He would go on to win the 1934 Italian 500 cc national championship. Tenni first travelled to the Isle of Man TT in 1935. For a newcomer, he performed remarkably well. He was lying in second to his teammate Woods, when he crashed in a fog bank on the mountain section. It was here that he came to be dubbed the Black Devil referring both to the color of his hair and his diabolical riding style. He would again capture the 500 cc Italian National Championship in 1935.

The highlight of Tenni's career was winning the 250cc Lightweight TT at the 1937 Isle of Man TT, becoming the first Italian to win the TT. In 1937 he also won the 250cc European Championship. He suffered serious injuries in the 1938 and 1940 seasons then his racing career was put on hold by World War II. After the war, he began racing again, claiming his fourth Italian 500 cc championship in 1947. He put in a respectable performance at the 1948 Isle of Man TT where he set the race's fastest lap and led the race before mechanical difficulties forced him back to ninth place. Omobono Tenni had 47 victories racing for Moto Guzzi in the period from 1933 to 1948.

=== Maserati ===
In the mid-1930s, Tenni ventured into car racing, and in 1936 and 1937 drove for Maserati, but was not as successful as on two wheels, although he did compete in the 1936 Mille Miglia, finishing first in his class and fifth overall.

== Death ==
At the 1948 Bern Grand Prix at Bremgarten (a support race for the 1948 Swiss Grand Prix for automobiles), Tenni died after a crash during practice. The accident happened five hours after Achille Varzi had crashed and died at the same track.

== Legacy ==
A football Stadium in Treviso, Stadio Omobono Tenni, is named after him.

== Sources ==
Sporting positions
Preceded by H. G. Tyrell Smith	250cc Motorcycle European Champion; 1937	Succeeded by Ewald Kluge
Preceded by Georg Meier (1939)	500cc Motorcycle European Champion; 1947	Succeeded by Enrico Lorenzetti
