= 1938 Isle of Man TT =

Annual motorcycle racing event

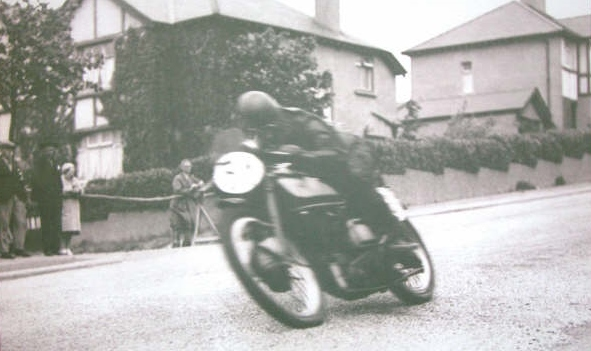
1938 Senior TT winner Harold Daniell at Bray Hill

The 1938 Isle of Man Tourist Trophy saw the Senior TT lap record of 90.27 mph set by Freddie Frith the previous year broken in 1938 when Harold Daniell completed a lap at 91.00 mph on his Norton, a record which would stand for 12 years. He won, beating Stanley Woods by only 14.4 seconds. Stanley Woods won the Junior, with Harold Daniell coming fifth, while Ewald Kluge on a DKW won the Lightweight. Kluge was the second Lightweight TT winning non-British rider in a row, Omobono Tenni having won the previous year.

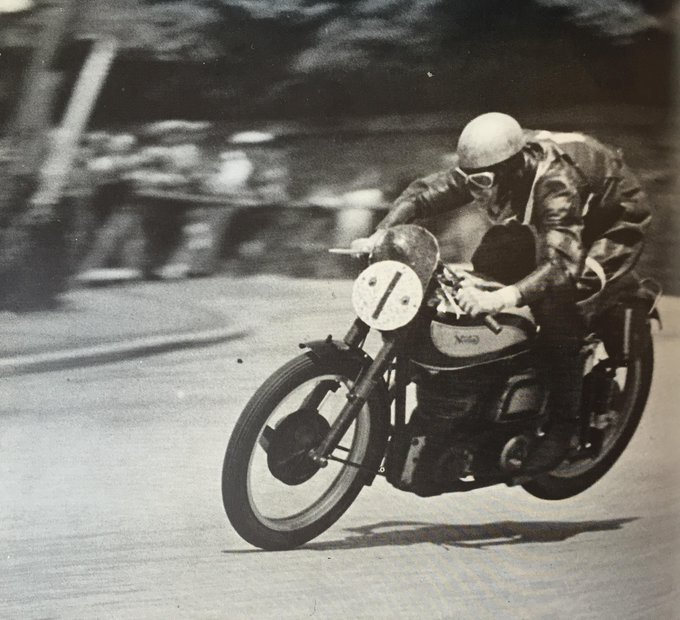
Third at the Senior TT; Freddie Frith, at Bray Hill

Between 1931 and 1937 Norton had six Senior-TT wins with the long-stroke CamShaft One (CS1) engine. Norton entered the 1938 Senior TT with a new short-stroke engine, new telescopic front forks, and won for the 7th time, with rider Harold Daniell.

Eric Oliver, who later won 4 sidecar World Championships, was entered this year, but retired his Norton from the Junior TT with a broken chain.

== Senior TT (500cc) ==
Rank	Rider	Team	Speed	Time
1	(United Kingdom) Harold Daniell	Norton	89.11	2.57.50.6
2	(Republic of Ireland) Stanley Woods	Velocette	88.99	2:58.05.8
3	(United Kingdom) Freddie Frith	Norton	88.98	2:58.07.4
4	(United Kingdom) John H. White	Norton	87.14	3:01.52.0
5	(United Kingdom) Jock West	BMW	85.92	3:04.27.0
6	(United Kingdom) Ted Mellors	Velocette	84.67	3:07.10.0
7	(United Kingdom) Les Archer	Velocette	81.39	3:14.43.0
8	(South Africa) Johnny Galway	Norton	81.23	3:15.36.0
9	(United Kingdom) Jock Weddell	Norton	78.31	3:22.22.0
10	(United Kingdom) Ken Boardman	Norton	78.28	3:22.28.0

== Junior TT (350cc) ==
Rank	Rider	Team	Speed	Time
1	(Republic of Ireland) Stanley Woods	Velocette	84.08 mph	3.08.30.0
2	(United Kingdom) Ted Mellors	Velocette	82.4	3:12.20.0
3	(United Kingdom) Freddie Frith	Norton	82.35	3:12.27.0
4	(United Kingdom) John H. White	Norton	82.14	3:12.56.0
5	(United Kingdom) Harold Daniell	Norton	80.54	3:16.32.0
6	(United Kingdom) David Whitworth	Velocette	78.49	3:21.54.0
7	(United Kingdom) Norman Croft	Norton	76.45	3:27.16.0
8	(United Kingdom) Jack Williams	Norton	76.23	3:27.39.0
9	(France) Roger Loyer	Velocette	76.1	3:28.15.0
10	(United Kingdom) Harry Craine	Norton	75.58	3:29.42.0

== Lightweight TT (250cc) ==
Rank	Rider	Team	Speed	Time
1	(Nazi Germany) Ewald Kluge	DKW	78.48 mph	3.21.56.0
2	(United Kingdom) Ginger Wood	Excelsior	74.38	3:33.06.0
3	(Republic of Ireland) Henry Tyrell-Smith	Excelsior	73.62	3:35.16.0
4	(United Kingdom) Maurice Cann	Excelsior	72.07	3:39.54.0
5	(Republic of Ireland) Charlie Manders	Excelsior	71.68	3:41.06.0
6	(United Kingdom) Jack Forbes	Excelsior	70.98	3:43.16.0
7	(United Kingdom) Les G. Martin	Excelsior	70.77	3:43.56.0
8	(United Kingdom) George Paterson	New Imperial	69.62	3:47.39.0
9	(South Africa) Johnny Galway	Excelsior	68.87	3:50.07.0
10	(United Kingdom) Stan Miller	OK-Supreme	68.65	3:50.51.0

== Notes ==
- Improvements to the course include road-widening and resurfacing work at Greeba Bridge, Sulby Straight and the 26th Milestone.
