= Husqvarna 500 =

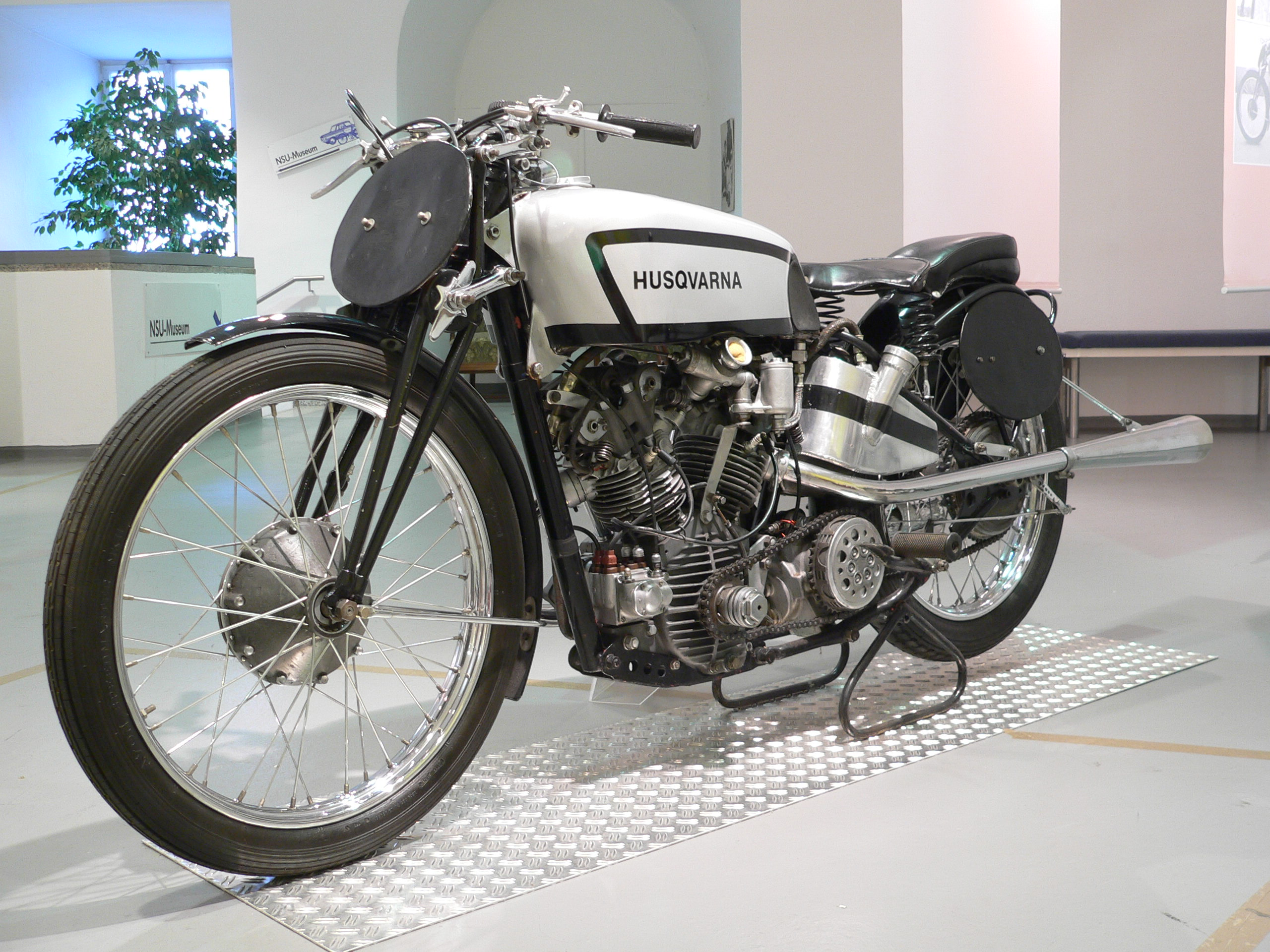
- Manufacturer: Husqvarna Motorcycles
- Production: 1930-1935

The Husqvarna 500 is a racing motorcycle that was produced by Husqvarna Motorcycles, which was used in races from 1930 to 1935.

== Overview ==
The motorsport development dates back to Folke Mannerstedt, who began working as a designer at Husqvarna in 1928. Experiments were conducted with two racing models as early as 1929, and the 500 cc V-twin engine with hairpin valve springs made its debut at the 1930 Swedish Grand Prix in Saxtorp. The 1931 Isle of Man TT was unsuccessful for Husqvarna, with both machines retiring. Completely newly developed engines were developed in 1932. These "highly interesting racing machines" at the time featured Elektron engine casings, two 25 mm Amal carburetors, and unusually long exhaust pipes precisely matched in length. Power was transmitted to the rear wheel by a Sturmey-Archer four-speed gearbox and a chain. The high-revving and powerful engine was mounted in a closed rigid frame with a trapezoidal fork; the front and rear wheels had 180 mm conical brake drums.

Riding a Husqvarna 500, Ragnar Sunnqvist won the 1932 Swedish Grand Prix, with Gunnar Kalén finishing second. The following year, Kalén won, and in 1934, Sunnqvist again won. Nevertheless, 1934 was a disastrous year for Husqvarna. Both riders retired from the Isle of Man TT, and Kalén was killed in a crash at the German Grand Prix. In 1935, Sunnqvist won the Swedish Grand Prix again on the AVUS, beating the strong BMW and Stanley Woods. After a fire destroyed almost all of Husqvarna's racing machines, Husqvarna ceased racing.

Very few examples have survived in Sweden. A 1935 example is in the Sammy Miller Museum Collection in New Milton, Hampshire, and another example is in the German Two-Wheeler and NSU Museum in Neckarsulm.
