= 1937 Isle of Man TT =

Annual motorcycle racing event

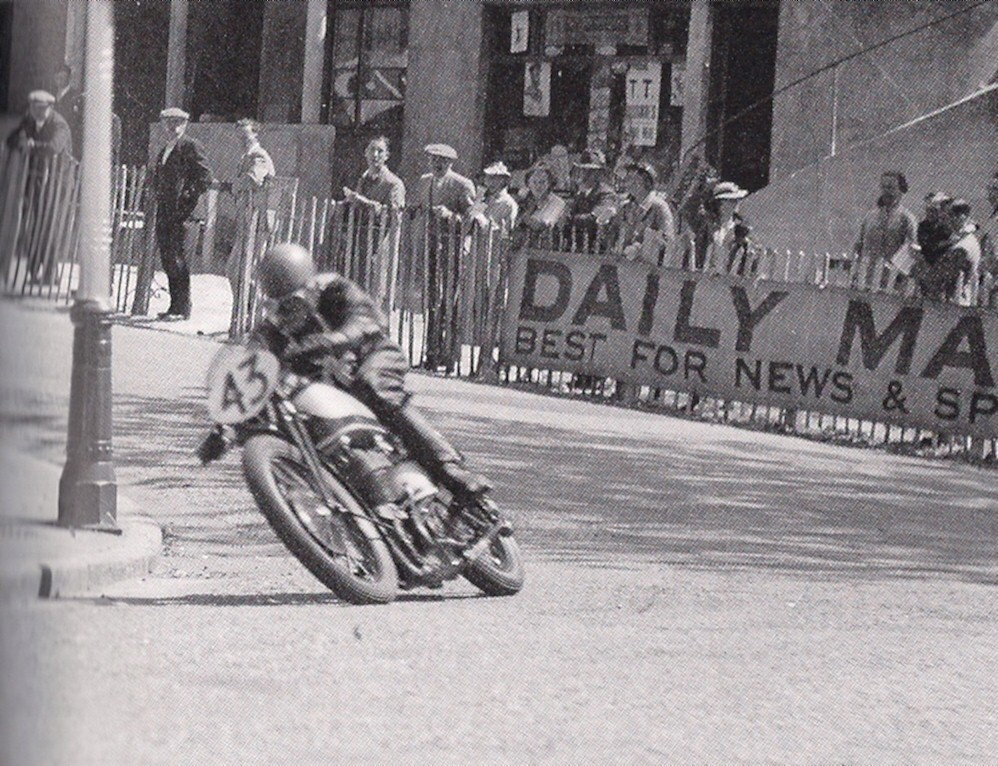
Senior TT winner Freddie Frith at Quarterbridge (pictured during the Junior TT, in which he finished 2nd)

The 1937 Isle of Man Tourist Trophy saw Freddie Frith break the 90+ mph lap for the first time during the Senior TT with a speed of 90.27 mph on his Norton beating Stanley Woods by only 15 seconds. Frith also beat Wood in the Junior TT but only with a second placing.

The popular Jimmie Guthrie, who was killed during the German Grand Prix later that year, won Junior race but retired in the Senior TT at the Cutting, where a memorial was erected. The location, on the uphill climb from Ramsey to the Bungalow, on the Mountain Course, is now known as the Guthrie Memorial.

Harold Daniell who had been a works rider for AJS entered the 1937 TT with a three-year-old Norton tuned by his brother-in-law, Steve Lancefield which gave him a fifth place, a finishing position he also achieved in the Junior TT.

In the Lightweight TT Omobono Tenni becomes the first foreigner to secure a victory in an Isle of Man TT race on his Moto Guzzi.

== Senior TT (500cc) ==
Rank	Rider	Team	Speed	Time
1	(United Kingdom) Freddie Frith	Norton	88.21	2.59.41.0
2	(Republic of Ireland) Stanley Woods	Velocette	88.09	2:59.56.0
3	(United Kingdom) John H. White	Norton	83.97	3:08.44.0
4	(United Kingdom) Ted Mellors	Velocette	86.68	3:09.24.0
5	(United Kingdom) Harold Daniell	Norton	83.61	3:09.33.0
6	(United Kingdom) Jock West	BMW	81.5	3:14.28.0
7	(South Africa) Johnny Galway	Norton	80.26	3:17.28.0
8	(United Kingdom) Les Archer	Velocette	76.96	3:25.55.0
9	(United Kingdom) Noel Pope	Norton	76.73	3:26.22.0
10	(United Kingdom) Jack Williams	Norton	75.62	3:29.35.0

== Junior TT (350cc) ==
Rank	Rider	Team	Speed	Time
1	(Scotland) Jimmie Guthrie	Norton	84.43 mph	3.07.42.0
2	(United Kingdom) Freddie Frith	Norton	83.29	3:10.17.0
3	(United Kingdom) John H. White	Norton	82.54	3:12.00.0
4	(Republic of Ireland) Stanley Woods	Velocette	82.33	3:12.30.0
5	(United Kingdom) Harold Daniell	Norton	78.77	3:21.12.0
6	(United Kingdom) Ernie Thomas	Velocette	78.63	3:21.34.0
7	(Republic of Ireland) Henry Tyrell-Smith	Excelsior	77.25	3:25.10.0
8	(United Kingdom) George Rowley	AJS	76.82	3:26.18.0
9	(South Africa) Johnny Galway	Norton	75.98	3:28.25.0
10	(United Kingdom) Jack Williams	Norton	75.4	3:30.11.0

== Lightweight TT (250cc) ==
Rank	Rider	Team	Speed	Time
1	(Italy) Omobono Tenni	Moto Guzzi	74.72 mph	3.32.06.0
2	(United Kingdom) Ginger Wood	Excelsior	74.5	3:32.43.0
3	(United Kingdom) Ernie Thomas	DKW	73.17	3:36.36.0
4	(United Kingdom) Les Archer	New Imperial	72.98	3:37.09.0
5	(Nazi Germany) Siegfried Wünsche	DKW	72.47	3:38.42.0
6	(United Kingdom) Chris Tattersall	CTS	69.25	3:48.52.0
7	(United Kingdom) C. V. Moore	New Imperial	67.39	3:55.10.0
8	(United Kingdom) Stan Smith	Excelsior	66.3	3:59.03.0
9	(United Kingdom) Les G Martin	Cotton	65.1	4:03.26.0

Only 9 finishers

== Notes ==
- Stanley Woods has an incident with a dog at the bottom of Bray Hill on the 1st lap of the 1937 Junior TT Race and also loses the rear brake at the same place.
- During lap 1 of the 1937 Junior TT Race, H.Pinnington riding a Norton crashes at the Windy Corner and Marcel Simo riding a Terrot motor-cycle crashes at Glentramman on lap 3. On lap 4, J. Illichmann riding a NSU is disqualified for illegal refuelling.
- Omobono Tenni is called "Tombone" by fellow competitors who cannot pronounce his name. On the first lap of the 1937 Lightweight TT Race, Omobono Tenni slips of at Governors Bridge on lap 1 and leaves part of his exhaust of his Moto Guzzi behind. On lap 5, Ewald Kluge retires his DKW at Ballaugh with a broken throttle wire and Stanley Woods on lap 6 his DKW retires at Sulby. H.G.Tyrell Smith breaks down at Creg-na-Baa when his Excelsior breaks a connecting-rod on lap 6.
- On the last lap of the 1937 Senior TT Race, Freddie Frith and Stanley Woods are posted as a dead-heat.
