= Ewald Kluge =

German motorcycle racer (1909–1964)

- Nationality: German
- Born: 19 January 1909; Lausa, Germany
- Died: 19 August 1964 (aged 55); Ingolstadt, Germany
Motorcycle racing career statistics
Isle of Man TT career
TTs contested	3 (1937–1939)
TT wins	1
First TT win	1938 Lightweight TT
Last TT win	1938 Lightweight TT
TT podiums	2

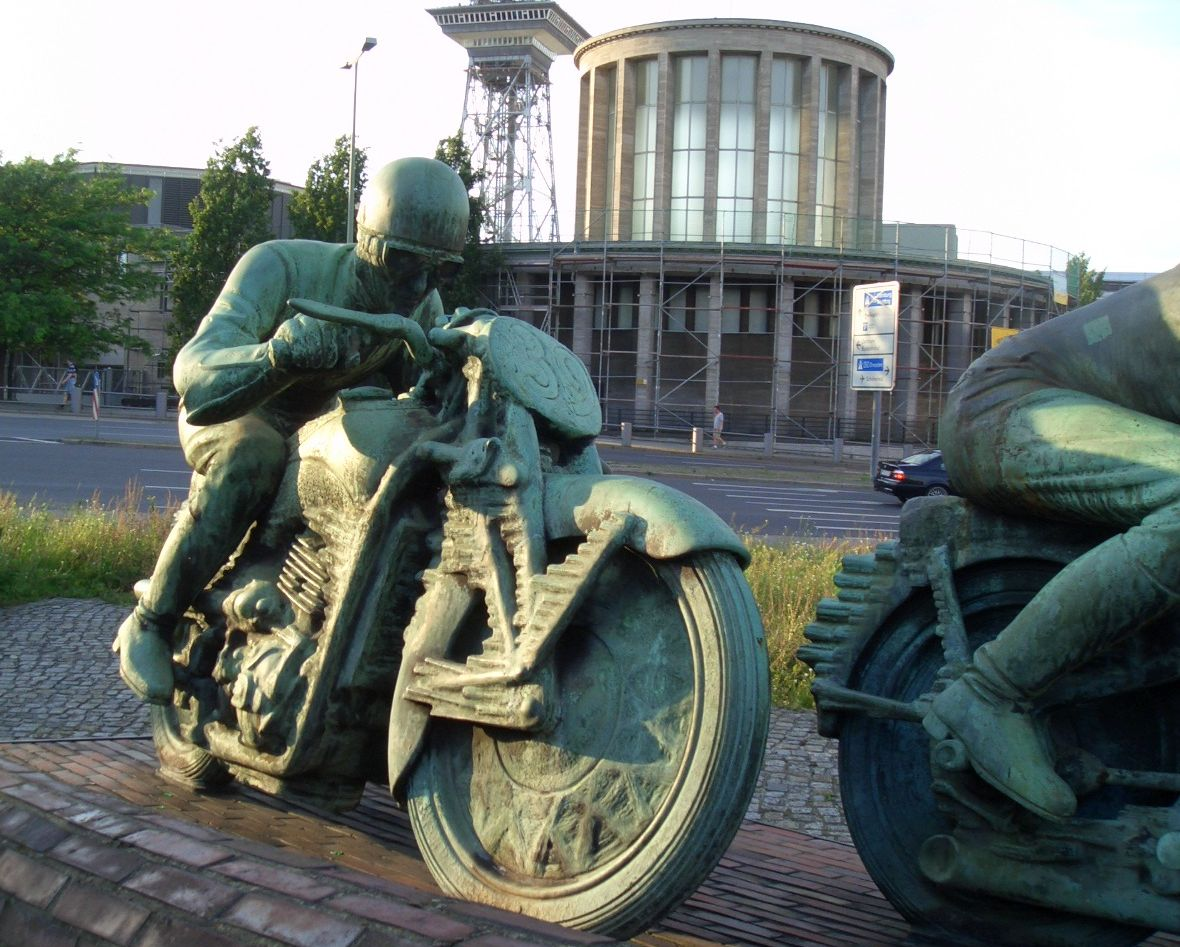
"Motorradfahrer", a monument to two motorcyclists. This one is Kluge on a DKW.

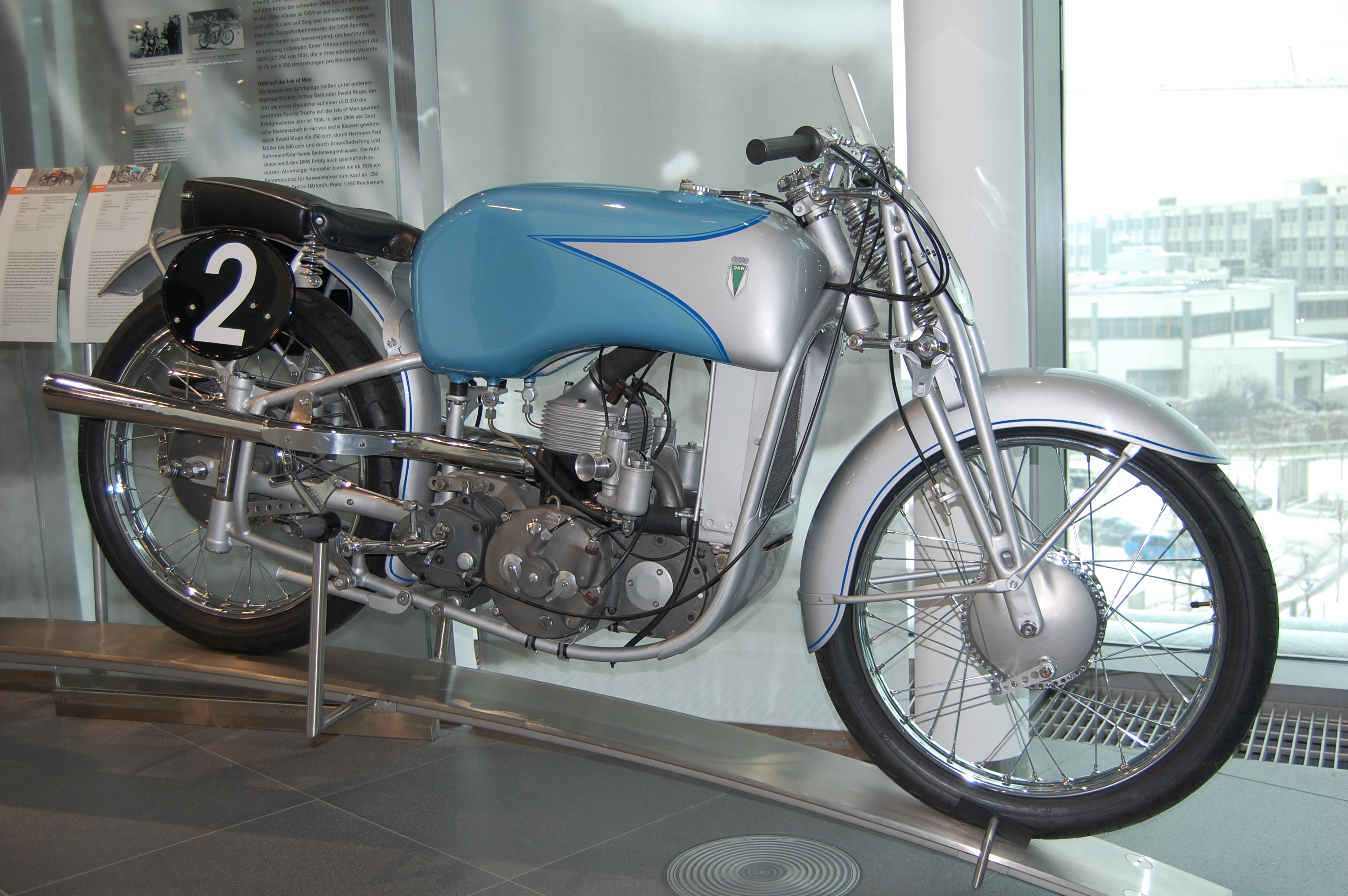
A DKW US 250, as used by Kluge in the 1939 season.

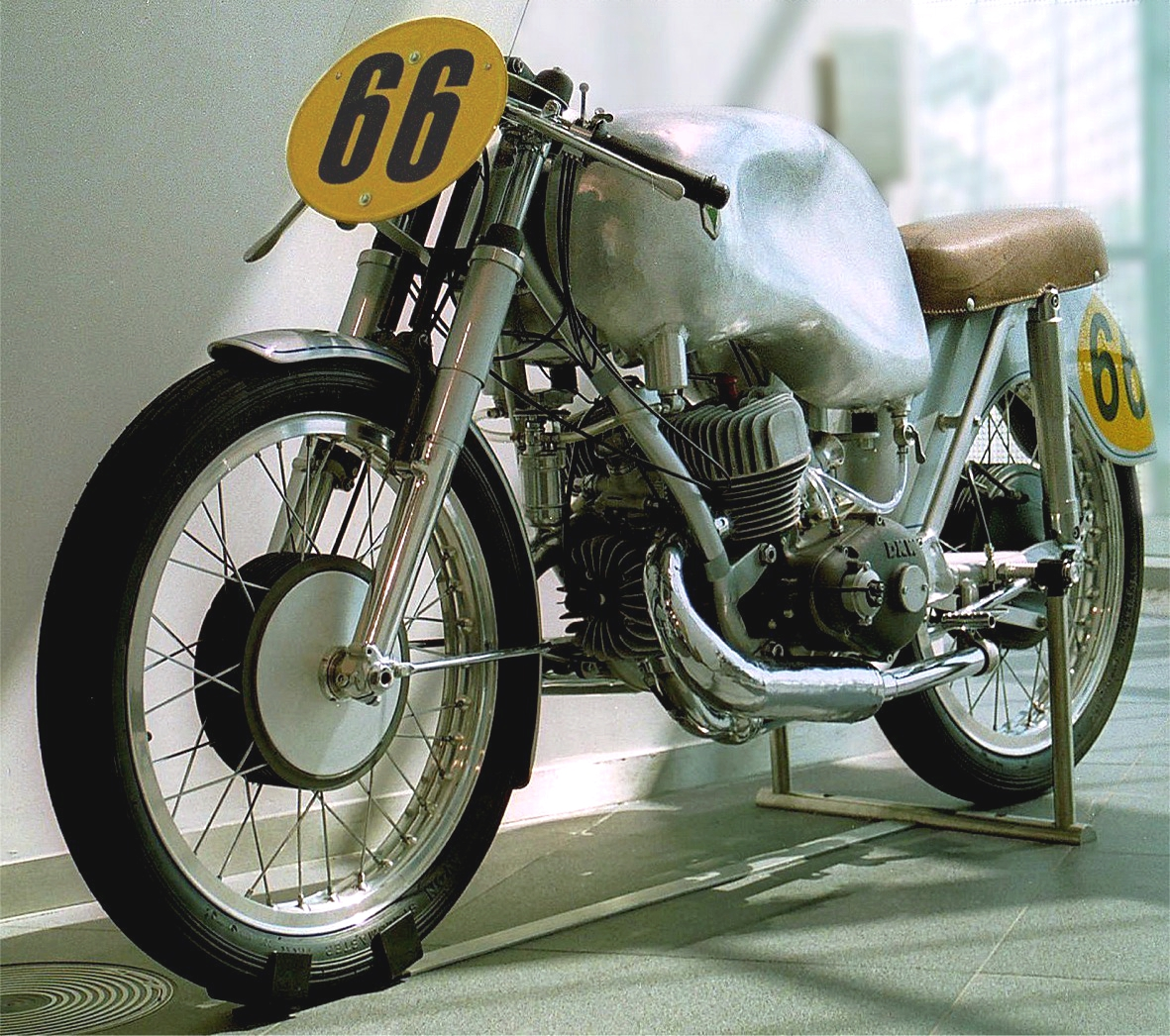
The 350 cc three cylinder DKW, used by Kluge in his final race.

Ewald Kluge (19 January 1909 – 19 August 1964) was a German motorcyclist.

== Life ==
Ewald Kluge had a difficult upbringing. At the age of twelve, his mother died and he was forced to stay at home, working for his father's company. At fourteen, he sought a teaching position but was unsuccessful and ended up washing cars, which led to an apprenticeship as a mechanic in a garage. At the age of nineteen he was made redundant and started working as a taxi driver in Dresden.

For 800 Reichsmarks Kluge bought a Dunelt motorcycle in which he entered the 1929 Freiberger Dreiecksrennen, starting first and finishing in third place. Over the next few years, Kluge rode a private DKW before joining the DKW works team in 1934 as a mechanic and backup rider. In 1935, he was made a full member of the works team.

From 1936 to 1939, Kluge was German champion in the 250 cc class, and in 1938 and 1939, he was also European champion. In June 1938, Kluge won the 250 cc Lightweight TT at the Isle of Man TT by a margin of eleven minutes and ten seconds over second placed Ginger Wood. He was the first German and only the second rider from continental Europe to win the race. Kluge was also a reserve driver for the Auto Union Grand Prix team but never appeared in a race.

During World War II, Kluge was a Sergeant in Leipzig at the school for army motorisation in Wünsdorf. In 1943, he was released from his role at the request of Auto Union, for whom he went to work in their testing department. After the war, the Russians denounced him as a Nazi and between 1946 and 1949 he was imprisoned in NKVD Special Camp No. 1.

From 1950, Kluge was once again a rider for DKW, often riding in both the 250 cc and 350 cc classes. In 1952, Kluge competed at the German Grand Prix, finishing fifth in the 350 cc race and fourth in the 250 cc race. In 1953, he had a serious crash at the Nürburgring in which he fractured his thigh, ending his riding career. Later he worked in public relations for Auto Union.

Kluge died on 19 August 1964 from cancer. He was married and had a son and a daughter.

== Legacy ==
In Ingolstadt and Weixdorf, there are streets named after Kluge. At AVUS in Berlin, there is a monument to him.
