= Georg Meier =

German motorcycle racer and racing driver (1910–1999)

- Meier with his historic 1939 BMW twin-cylinder Grand Prix race machine
- Nationality: German
- Born: 9 November 1910; Mühldorf am Inn, Bavaria, German Empire
- Died: 19 February 1999 (aged 88)
Motorcycle racing career statistics
Isle of Man TT career
TTs contested	2 (1938-1939)
TT wins	1
TT podiums	1

Georg "Schorsch" Meier (German pronunciation: [ˈɡeːɔʁk ʃɔʁʃ ˈmaɪɐ]; 9 November 1910 – 19 February 1999) was a German motorcycle racer famous for being the first foreign winner of the prestigious Senior TT, the Blue Riband race of the Isle of Man TT Races, in 1939 riding for the factory BMW team and the first motorcycle racer to lap a Grand Prix course at over 100 mph.

== Biography ==
Meier was born in Mühldorf am Inn, Bavaria, and after leaving school at the age of 14 years, he became an apprentice at a local motorcycle repair shop in Mühldorf am Inn, Bavaria, and became known as "Schorsch" (the Bavarian diminutive for Georg). After hearing that the Bavarian State Police were creating a motorcycle section, at the age of 19, Meier applied to join and was accepted in 1929. A trainee period of three years had to be completed before Meier was able to transfer to the motorcycle police section in 1932.

=== Racing career ===
After becoming a member of the Bavarian Police Team, Meier competed in 1000 km endurance trials that were popular at the time, considered as good training for motorcycle dispatch riders. In 1934, Meier attracted attention from the German Army motorcycle team after finishing a 1000 km enduro an hour ahead of schedule, riding an unpopular 400 cc single-cylinder BMW R4 with pressed-steel frame and out-moded trailing-link front forks. With fellow competitors Fritz Linhardt and Joseph Forstner in the German Army team, they won so many enduro events that Meier became known as "Der Gusseiserne Schorsch" (Ironman Georg).

=== 1937 International Six Day Trial ===
After many success at the 1000 km enduro events, Meier was selected for the German Trophy Team for the 1937 International Six Day Trial to be held in Wales. Along with teammates Joseph Stelzer and Ludwig Wiggerl Kraus who competed with a 600 cc BMW sidecar outfit, the German Trophy team then used 500 cc flat-twin BMW motor-cycles. At the end of the six day trial the British and German Trophy teams were level on points. The event was to be decided on a speed-test at the new Castle Donington race circuit. The British Trophy team used 350 cc machines and due to the handicap system, the 500 cc BMW motorcycles had to complete an extra-lap to win the 1937 ISDT. Two of the British riders had extensive road-racing experience with Vic Brittain riding a Norton and George Rowley riding an AJS. Despite having no road racing experience, Meier won the Donington speed-trial, but the German Trophy Team lost the event to Great Britain Team by 10 seconds on the handicap system. The German Team officials were so impressed by Meier's performance that they suggested to BMW that he should be given a trial for their race-team.

=== Racing for BMW Works Team 1937-1939 ===
The works BMW motorcycle team were looking for a replacement for Otto Ley who was about to retire from racing. At a race in Schleiz during 1937, Meier had the opportunity to try one of the new supercharged BMWs during practice. After a few laps, Meier entered the pits and reputedly told the BMW racing manager that "Road Racing is far too dangerous for me." The BMW team persuaded Meier to continue and he finished the practice session with fourth fastest time, but did not start the race as he was not officially entered by the BMW works team. After replacing Otto Ley in the BMW team for the 1938 season, Meier began 1938 by winning the Eilenriede Race at Hanover, setting race and lap records after a poor start which had left him in last place".

During the 1938 racing season, Meier rode a BMW RS 255 Kompressor in both European and German Championships. For the 1938 Isle of Man TT, he was entered by the BMW team along with Jock West and Karl Gall. The BMW team suffered setbacks when Karl Gall was injured in a crash during an unofficial practice, was found in a ditch above the Gooseneck, and was unable to race. On the startline for the 1938 Senior TT Race, one of the BMW mechanics stripped a cylinder-head thread during a spark plug change on the engine of Meier's Type 255 machine. Trying to start the 1938 Senior race on one cylinder, Meier soon retired on lap one at the bottom of Bray Hill. The race was won Harold Daniell riding for Norton at an average race speed of 89.11 mph and Jock West riding the works supercharged BMW finished in fifth place at an average race speed of 85.92 mph. In 1938, Meier went on to win the 500 cc Belgium Grand Prix at Spa-Francorchamps, the 500 cc Dutch TT, the German Grand Prix at the Hohenstein-Ernstthal (or Sachsenring) road course and the Italian Grand Prix at Monza. The 500 cc 1938 Ulster Grand Prix was won by BMW teammate Jock West and Meier became the 1938 500 cc European Motor-Cycle Champion.

For the 1939 racing season, despite being a Sergeant-Instructor with the Military Police, Meier continued racing for the factory BMW team during his periods of leave. During the 1939 season, Meier along with fellow motorcycle racer Hermann Paul Müller were reserve drivers for the German Auto-Union Racing Team. During practice for the 1939 Isle of Man TT Race, Meier's BMW teammate Kall Gall crashed at Ballaugh Bridge and later died of injuries combined with the effects of pneumonia in hospital. After considering withdrawing from the TT races, BMW management decided that Meier and Jock West would compete in the 1939 Senior TT race which Meier led from start to finish, winning at an average race speed of 89.38 mph. Jock West finished in second place.

=== 1939 Senior Isle of Man TT (500cc) ===
16 June 1939 - 7 laps (264.11 miles) Mountain Course

Rank	Rider	Team	Speed	Time
1	(Nazi Germany) Georg Meier	BMW	89.38 mph	2:57:19.0
2	(United Kingdom) Jock West	BMW	88.22	2:59:39.0
3	(United Kingdom) Freddie Frith	Norton	87.96	3:00:11.0

Two weeks after becoming the first foreign winner of the prestigious Senior TT race, Meier won the 500 cc 1939 Dutch TT at Assen. This was followed by a win at 500 cc 1939 Belgium Grand Prix at Spa-Francorchamps and becoming the first motorcycle racer to lap a Grand Prix course at over 100 mph. Despite missing the French Grand Prix, Meier competed instead for Auto Union driving to second place in Grand Prix De L'Automobile Club de France at Reims-Gueux. Returning to ride for a BMW motorcycle for the Swedish Grand Prix, Meier fell twice after chasing Dorino Serafini riding for Gilera and suffered a back-injury which prevented racing for the rest of the 1939 season. With further wins at the 500 cc German, Ulster and Italian GP races, Dorino Sefafini won the 500 cc class for the 1939 European Championship.

=== Auto Union Team 1939 ===
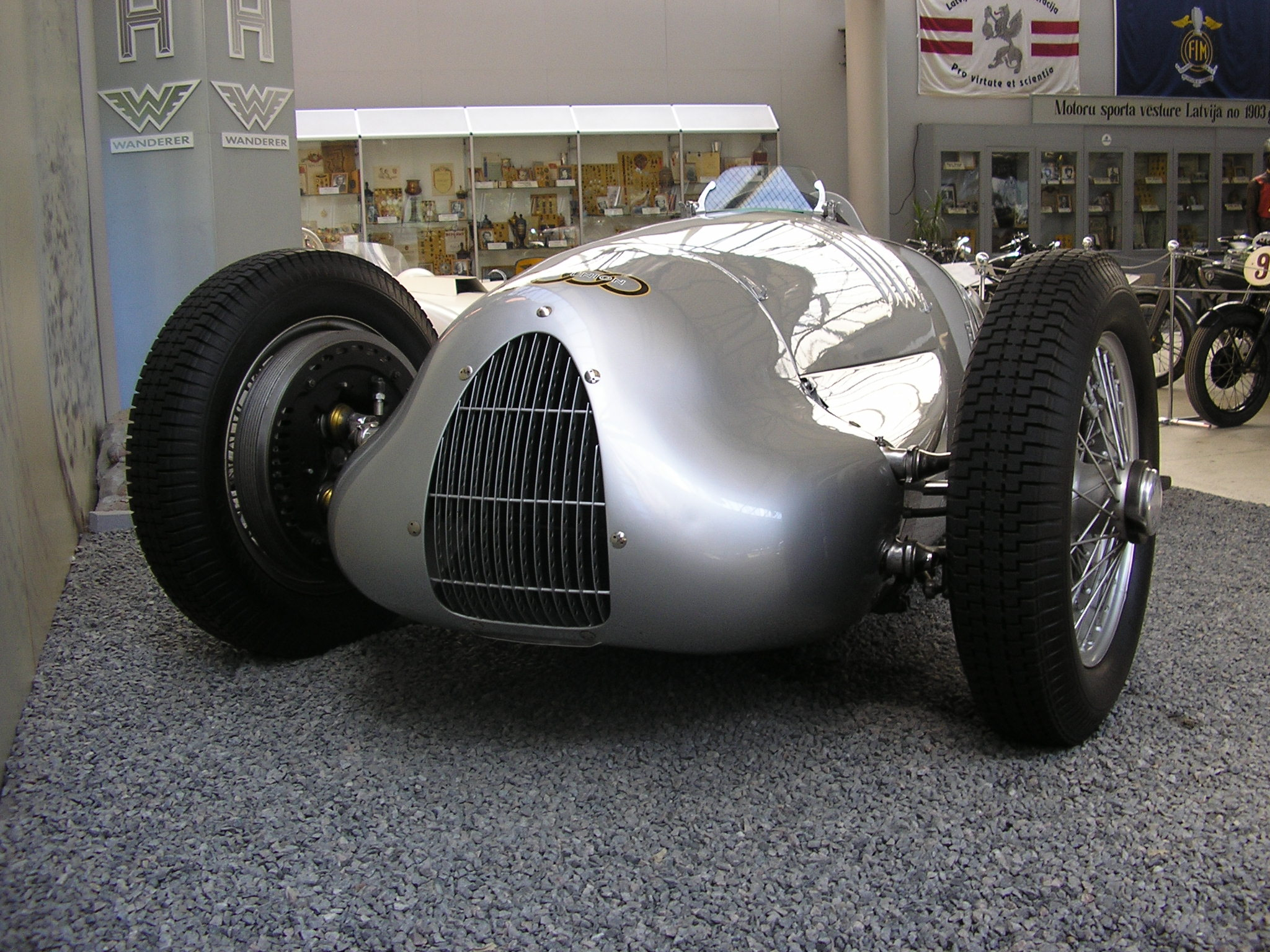
1938 Auto-Union V12 type D saved from being cut up for scrap metal

The 1939 Eifelrennen was the first race of the season for the Auto Union team. Along with fellow motorcycle racer Hermann Paul Müller, they acted as reserve drivers for the Auto Union team. After qualifying for the 1939 Eifelrennen, Hans Stuck injured his foot playing skittle and the place was taken by Meier, who failed to start the race after a technical failure of his Auto Union Type D. The 1939 Eifelrennen was won by Hermann Lang driving the Mercedes-Benz W154 after Tazio Nuvolari driving for Auto Union tried to run the race non-stop. For the 1939 Belgium Grand Prix, Meier again deputised for Hans Stuck in the Auto Union team. The race, held in heavy rain and poor visibility, was dominated by the Mercedes-Benz Silver Arrows of Dick Seaman and Hermann Lang. On lap 14, Meier's Auto Union Type D was forced into a ditch by privateer Adolphe Mandirola driving a Maserati 6CM at Blanchemont on the Spa-Francorchamps circuit and then retired. The 1939 Belgium Grand Prix was again won by Hermann Lang, but was domininated by the death of Dick Seaman in a crash at La Source hairpin. The 1939 French Grand Prix at Reims-Gueux was dominated by Auto Union after the retirement of the Mercedes-Benz drivers, after Rudolf Caracciola crashed on lap 1, a lap-17 engine failure for von Brauchitsch and Hermann Lang on lap 36. The race was won by Hermann Paul Müller for Auto Union and Meier finished in 2nd place after a pit-fire burnt his arm.

=== 1939 Race Results Auto Union Type D ===
Rank	Race	Circuit	Distance	Time
DNS	ADAC Eifelrennen	Nürburgring - Nordschleife	10 laps - 228.10 km	——
DNF	Grand Prix de Belgique	Spa-Francorchamps	35 laps - 507.50 km	——
2nd	Grand Prix De L'Automobile Club de France	Reims-Gueux	51 laps - 398.60 km	1 lap
DNF	Großer Preis von Deutschland	Nürburgring	22 laps - 501.82 km	——

=== War service ===
After the crash at the Swedish Grand Prix in Saxtorp outside Landskrona in August 1939, Meier spent two months recovering from a serious back-injury. This led to Meier being declared unfit for military service and spend the war as a motorcycle instructor for the German Military Police and as a driver to Wilhelm Canaris, head of the Abwehr, the German military intelligence service, from 1935 to 1944.

=== Post War Racing ===
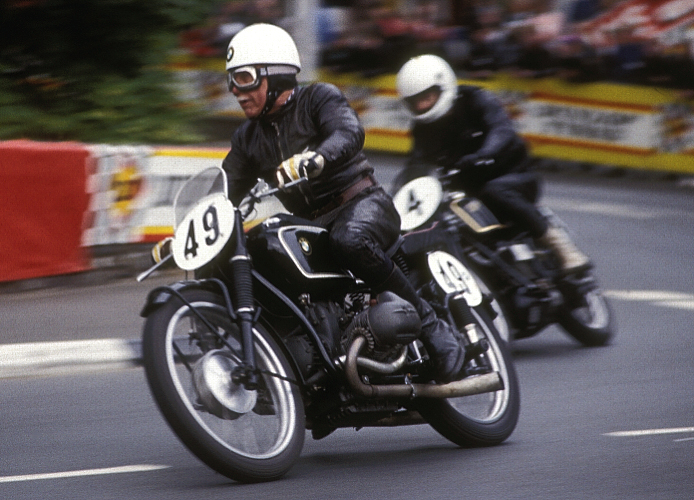
Georg Meier demonstrating the 1939 BMW Type 255 Kompressor during the 1989 Isle of Man TT race week

After the war, Germany was excluded from motor sport competition, including the world championships until 1951. Between 1947 and 1953, Meier won the German 500 cc championship on a modified pre-war supercharged BMW motorcycle for six years out of seven. In 1952 he narrowly missed out to young teammate Walter Zeller and became German Sportsman of the Year in 1949, the first time a motorcycle racer had won the prize. Meier formed the BMW Veritas Team and won the German sports car championship in 1948.

After regaining the German Championship from Walter Zeller in 1953, Meier retired from racing to concentrate on his BMW motorcycle business. In 1983 Meier appeared in a BMW campaign to celebrate 60 years of motorcycle production and the 50th anniversary of the 1939 Senior TT Race win, Meier demonstrated the BMW Type 255 Kompressor in the Lap of Honour during the 1989 Isle of Man TT race events.

== Sources ==
Sporting positions
Preceded by Jimmie Guthrie	500cc Motorcycle European Champion; 1938	Succeeded by Dorino Serafini
Awards
Preceded by (Germany) Gottfried von Cramm	German Sportsman of the Year; 1949	Succeeded by (Germany) Herbert Klein
