= AJS Porcupine =

British racing motorcycle

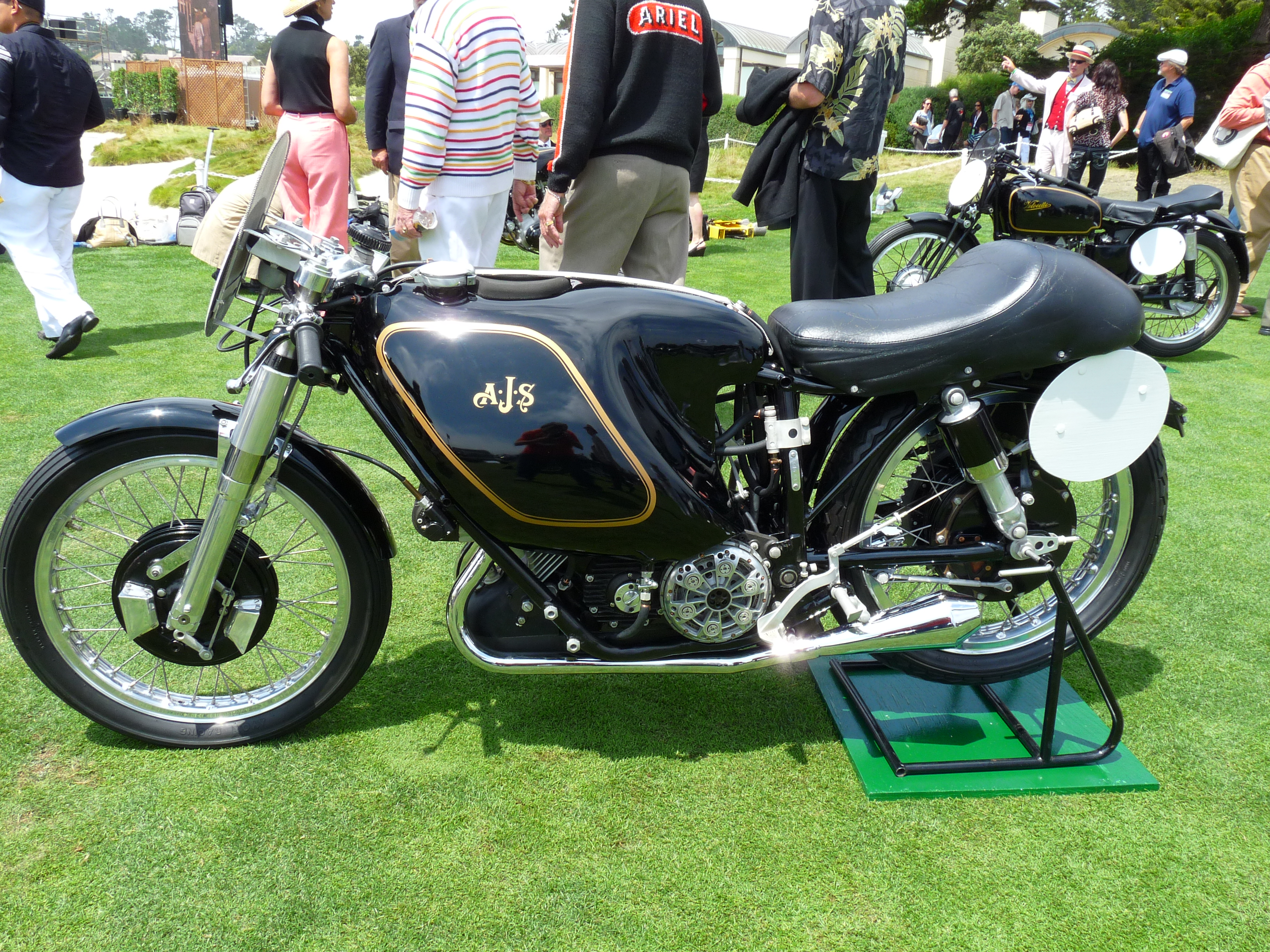
1954 AJS E95 "Porcupine" racing motorcycle

The AJS 500 cc Porcupine was a British racing motorcycle built by Associated Motor Cycles (AMC), which débuted in 1945 with a horizontal-engine designated E90S. The later E95 model was developed with an inclined-engine. AMC produced AJS and Matchless brands at the time.

== Racing history ==
The motorcycle was originally designed by AJS to be supercharged, as were a number of pre-war racing bikes, but the FICM banned supercharging in 1946. The motor was then worked on to allow it to perform without a supercharger. Jock West first rode the machine at the 1947 Isle of Man TT where he experienced teething problems relegating him to a 15th place, although he recorded the third fastest lap time of the race. Leslie Graham then rode the bike to victory in the inaugural 1949 FIM 500cc world championship. This was the only World Championship win for AJS. Despite this victory, the bike is often cited as unreliable, and not living up to its promise.

== Mechanicals ==
=== Engine ===
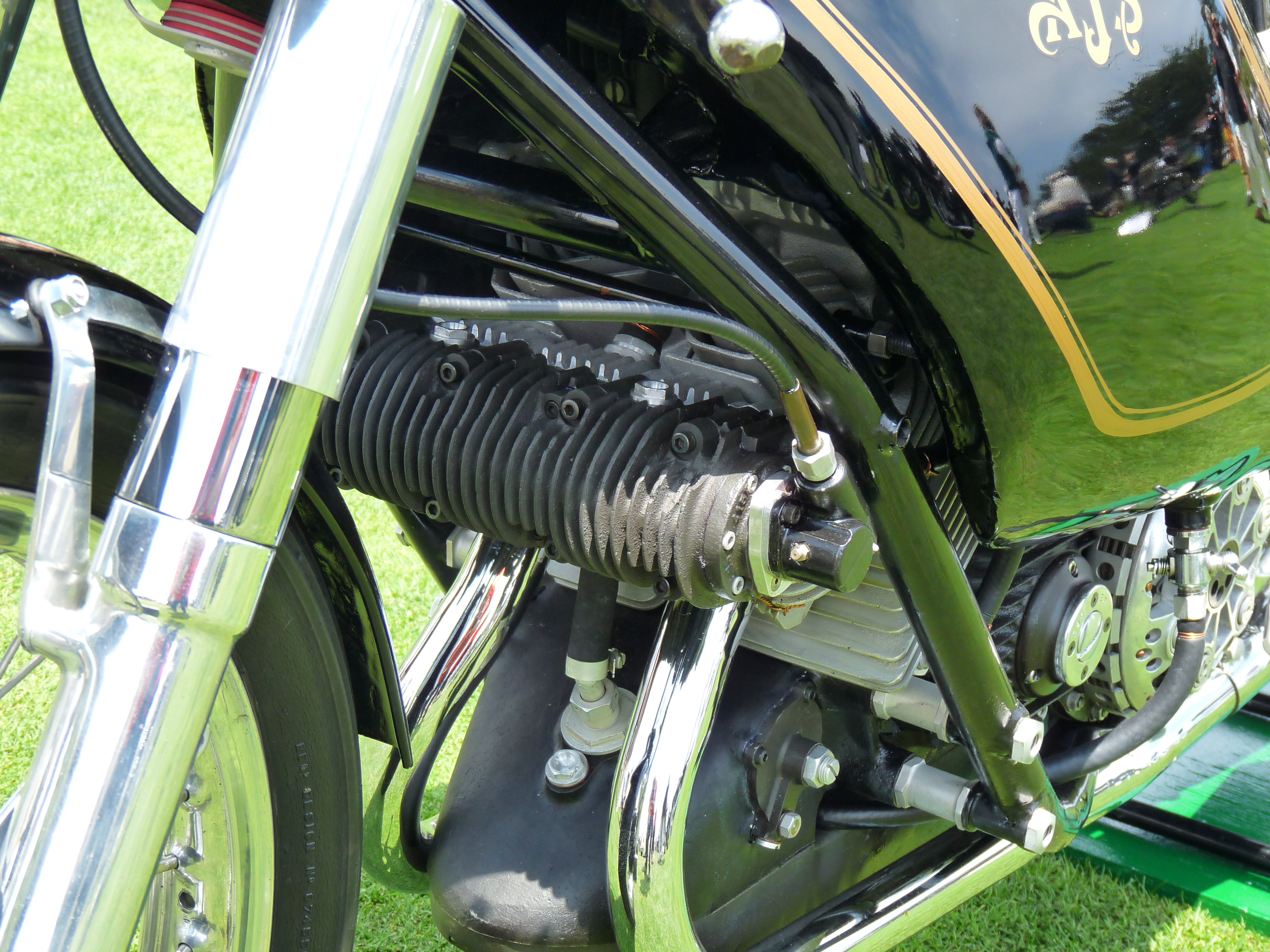
E95 Porcupine engine

The E90S Porcupine engine was a unit construction, aluminium alloy, 500 cc, DOHC twin, with horizontal cylinders and heads, to give the bike a low centre of gravity. A later version of this motor was named the E95, re-engineered to have its cylinders inclined at 45 degrees for better cooling and easier carburettor installation, and is claimed to have produced 55 bhp @ 7600 rpm

The gear drive for the camshafts was on the right of the motor, while the gear primary drive was on the left. The geared primary drive meant that the motor ran "backwards". The cam gear drive also drove a jackshaft at the rear of the cylinders, which drove an oil pump, a fuel pump, and (via a chain drive) a Lucas magneto. The four-speed gearbox output was on the right.

As originally designed, the E90S was to be supercharged, with the blower mounted above the gearbox, and driven by the clutch. The loss of the supercharger meant that the design was compromised, lacking sufficient flywheel effect, which caused problems with magneto failure. The main initial change was to reduce the valve angle to 90 degrees for a more compact combustion chamber.

It had rubber mounted twin GP carburettors, inclined at 49 degrees, with an unusual float tank system used rather than float bowls. Plain bearings were used for the big end bearings and the centre main bearings. The outer main bearings were rollers. One problem cited for the engine is the use of non parallel valves with conventional rockers.

The 1947 model engine was mostly made of alloy, but, as an experiment, the head was cast in silver for increased thermal efficiency. Due to the softness of silver, it had to be alloyed to make it hard enough for racing use. By the time this was achieved the thermal efficiency gains were lost, and the experiment was abandoned. There is dispute as to whether the silver cylinder head went beyond feasibility-study stage.

=== Frame ===
The Porcupine used "Jam-pot" shocks and Teledraulic race forks. The E90 model had an open frame. The E95, introduced in 1953, had a loop type frame with the motor mounted lower.

Only four E95 Porcupines were built.

== The AJS Porcupine today ==
Team Obsolete have restored a 1954 AJS Porcupine E95, using an ex-Tom Arter MKII motor, which features a unique Jack Williams built up roller bearing crankshaft. They use it for exhibition and historic racing.

Tom Arter put a complete 1954 E95 AJS Porcupine up for auction, and it sold for $228,620.

A 1954 AJS E95 Porcupine was sold post-auction at Bonhams in 2011, for $675,000 (plus fees).

== See also ==
- List of motorcycles of the 1940s
