= BMW WR 750 =

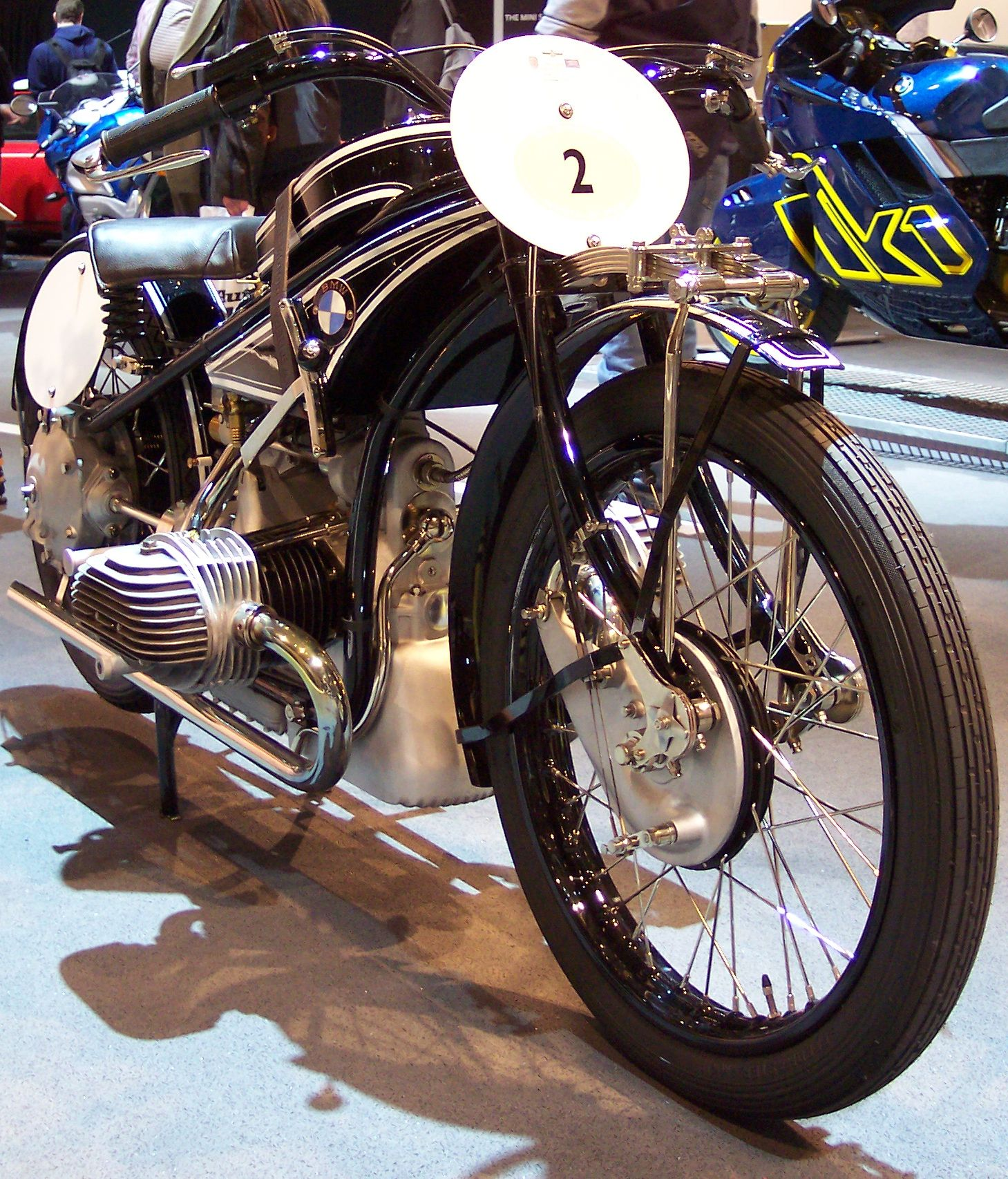
- Manufacturer: BMW Motorcycles works team
- Production: 1929–c. 1935
- Successor: BMW Type 255
- Class: Race motorcycle and speed record challenger
- Engine: 750 cc OHV supercharged flat twin
- Transmission: Shaft drive
- Suspension: Front: leading link fork Rear: Rigid
- Related: BMW R 37

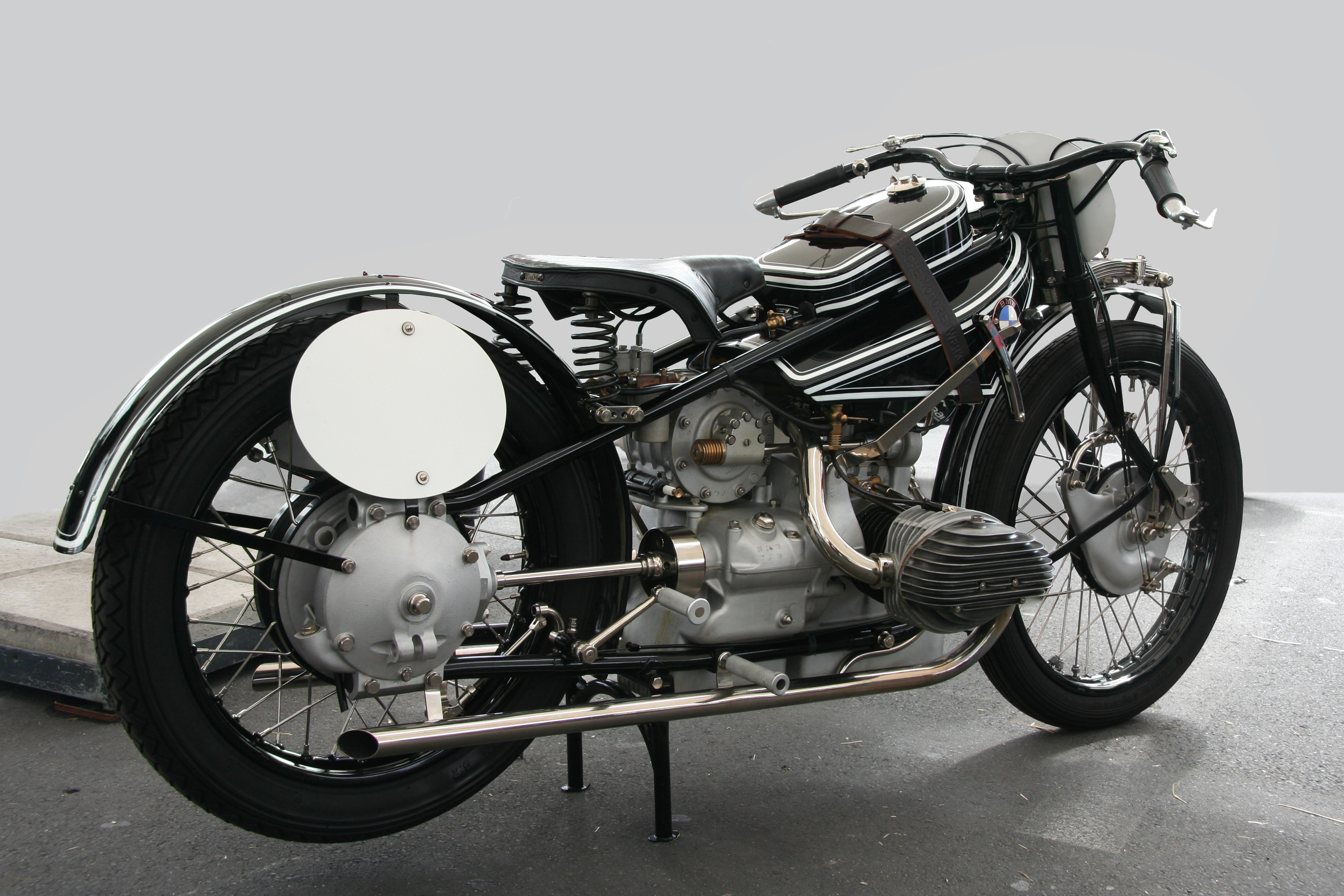
BMW WR 750

The BMW WR 750 was a supercharged racing motorcycle from BMW with two-cylinder, four-stroke flat twin engine that was first built in 1929, and developed through 1935 solely for racing by the factory.

== History ==
The idea to equip the flat twin engine with a supercharger came from the designer of the BMW R 37 race bike, Rudolf Schleicher. But after his departure from BMW, the concept was transferred to the racing mechanic Josef Hopf, closest confidant of Rudolf Schleicher, and the BMW works driver and German Champion of 1926 and 1927, Ernst Jakob Henne. The first engines ran on the test bench in 1928.

== Races and record attempts ==
The WR 500 (the 500cc pushrod-engine, supercharged racer) and WR 750 were raced by factory team members in Grands Prix, and used for attempts at the Motorcycle Land-Speed Record, in competition with English brands Zenith, OEC, and Brough Superior. The Land Speed Record passed back and forth between these four brands through the 1930s, with the WR 750 taking the ultimate record on five occasions: first in 1929 (134.67mph), and ultimately in 1935 at 159.10mph.

From 1936, BMW switched to their next generation of supercharged BMWs, with the Type 255, which went on to secure the Land-Speed Record in 1937 at 173.68mph, which stood until 1951.

== Record runs ==
The first official world speed record for BMW was set by Ernst Jakob Henne on a WR 750 on 19 September 1929 with 216.75 km/h (134.68 mph) over the mile with flying start. The record runs with the pushrod compressor engines were continued until 1935.

== Design ==
The Werksrennmotorräder ("works racebikes", initialized WR) WR 500 and WR 750 designs were derived from the R 37.

=== Engine ===
The engine was a longitudinally mounted flat twin four-stroke engine with overhead valves. The compressor was located on top of the gearbox, and in the first version was driven by an additional open parallel shaft next to the magneto with a right-angle bevel gear linkage. Thus, the compressor shaft ran transversely to the direction of travel. The boost pressure was up to 2 bar depending on application. The tank was shortened compared to the series motorcycles to make room for the compressor. The single carburetor was located behind the compressor.

The original WR 750 (1929) was built with the compressor driven by a chain from the flywheel, under a highly modified engine cover, with the compressor shaft lying perpendicular to the direction of travel. The orientation and type of supercharger was changed several times of the years, from Zoller to BMW's own design. The chain-drive supercharger was problematic due to surges in pressure with changes in engine revolutions, especially in road racing events. A shaft-driven supercharger was ultimately used on the WR 750.

=== Drive ===
The WR 750 had a manual transmission with shaft drive on the right side of the unsprung rear wheel.

=== Suspension ===
The front fork utilized a leading link fork, suspended by two leaf spring assemblies. The brakes were considerably enlarged and improved from those furnished on the production motorcycles.

== See also ==
- List of motorcycles of the 1920s
- List of motorcycles of the 1930s
- List of motorcycles by type of engine
- Motorcycle land-speed record
