= 1939 Isle of Man TT =

Annual motorcycle racing event

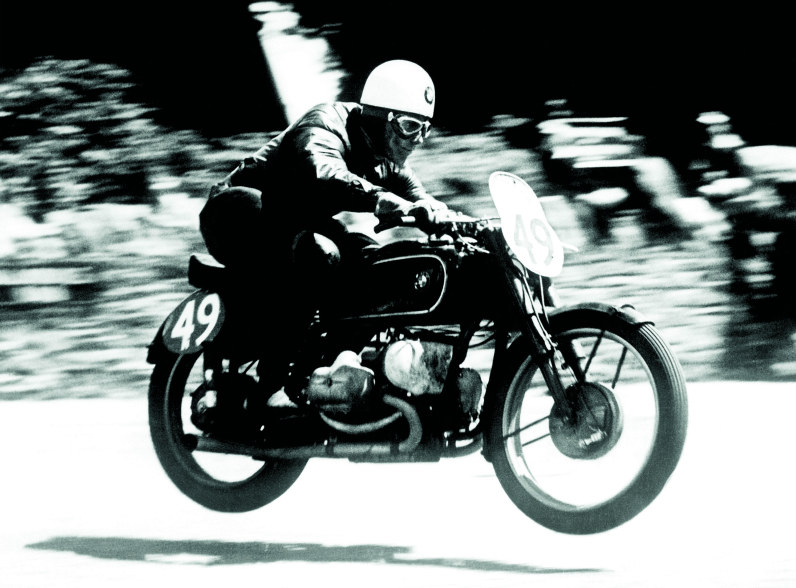
Senior TT winner Georg Meier

The 1939 Isle of Man Tourist Trophy was the last races until 1947 due to the interruption by World War II. It was also the last of ten Isle of Man TT victories for the 34-year-old Stanley Woods in which he won the Junior TT on a Velocette at 83.19 mph and also finished in 4th place in the Senior TT race. The 250cc Lightweight TT race was a first time winner for Ted Mellors and the Benelli marque. The Senior TT race was won by the German competitor Georg Meier on a supercharged 500cc BMW Type 255 motor-cycle.

The Austrian competitor Karl Gall riding for the works BMW team crashes at Ballaugh Bridge during an evening practice session and later dies of his injuries and the effects of pneumonia in hospital.

== Junior TT (350 cc) Race final standings ==
Monday 12 June 1939 – 7 laps (264.133 miles) Isle of Man TT Mountain Course

Rank	No	Rider	Team	Speed	Time
1		(Republic of Ireland) Stanley Woods	Velocette	83.19 mph	3:10.30.0
2		(United Kingdom) Harold Daniell	Norton	83.13 mph	3:10.38.0
3		(Nazi Germany) Heiner Fleischmann	DKW	82.51 mph	3:12.28.0
4		(United Kingdom) Ted Mellors	Velocette	82.34 mph	3:12.28.0
5		(United Kingdom) David Whitworth	Velocette	79.58 mph	3:19.09.0
6		(Nazi Germany) Siegfried Wünsche	DKW	78.87 mph	3:20.57.0
7		(United Kingdom) Maurice Cann	Norton	78.78 mph	3:21.10.0
8		(United Kingdom) S. (Ginger) Wood	Velocette	78.55 mph	3:22.36.0
9		(United Kingdom) Ernie Thomas	Velocette	48.69 mph	3:26.18.0
10		(Australia) Frank Mussett	Velocette	77.60 mph	3:24.14.0

Fastest Lap: Harold Daniels – 85.05 mph (26’ 38.0) on lap 7.

== Lightweight TT (250 cc) Race final standings ==
Wednesday 14 June 1939 – 7 laps (264.133 miles) Isle of Man TT Mountain Course

Rank	No	Rider	Team	Speed	Time
1		(United Kingdom) E.A. Ted Mellors	Benelli	74.26 mph	3:33.26.0
2		(Nazi Germany) Ewald Kluge	DKW	72.97 mph	3:37.11.0
3		(Republic of Ireland) H. G. Tyrell Smith	Excelsior	71.91 mph	3:40.23.0
4		(United Kingdom) Les G. Martin	Excelsior	68.87 mph	3:50.08.0
5		(Nazi Germany) Siegfried Wünsche	DKW	68.78 mph	3:50.25.0
6		(Republic of Ireland) Charlie Manders	Excelsior	66.93 mph	3:56.48.0
7		(United Kingdom) Harold Hartley	Excelsior	66.19 mph	3:59.27.0
8		(United Kingdom) Ernie Thomas	DKW	65.81 mph	4:00.48.0
9		(United Kingdom) S. (Ginger) Wood	Rudge	65.04 mph	4:03.41.0
10		(United Kingdom) Chris Tattersall	CTS	63.95 mph	4:07.50.0

Fastest Lap: Stanley Woods – 78.16 mph (28’ 58.0)

== Senior TT (500cc) Race final standings ==
Friday 16 June 1939 – 7 laps (264.133 miles) Isle of Man TT Mountain Course

Rank	No	Rider	Team	Speed	Time
1	49	(Nazi Germany) Georg Meier	494cc BMW	89.38 mph	2:57.19.0
2	35	(United Kingdom) Jock West	494cc BMW	88.22 mph	2:59.39.0
3	17	(United Kingdom) Freddie Frith	499cc Norton	87.96 mph	3:00.11.0
4	10	(Republic of Ireland) Stanley Woods	499cc Velocette	87.91 mph	3:00.17.0
5	51	(United Kingdom) John H. White	499cc Norton	85.92 mph	3:04.27.0
6	19	(United Kingdom) Les Archer	495cc Velocette	84.31 mph	3:07.58.0
7	28	(United Kingdom) Ted Mellors	495cc Velocette	83.76 mph	3:09.12.0
8	18	(United Kingdom) S.Wood	499cc Norton	48.69 mph	3:26.18.0
9	20	(United Kingdom) Maurice Cann	Moto Guzzi	81.96 mph	3:13.22.0
10	40	(South Africa) Jack Galway	499cc Norton	81.37 mph	3:15.00.0

Fastest Lap: Georg Meier – 90.75 mph (24’ 57.0) on lap 2.

== Notes ==
- Improvements to the course include road-widening and landscaping at the Water Works Corner.
- At Sulby during practice, Georg Meier riding for BMW is timed at 111 mph.
- A collision occurs on Bray Hill during lap 2 of the 1939 Junior TT Races when Sven A. Sorenson riding an Excelsior collides with H. B. Waddington and David Whitworth both riding Norton motor-cycles.
- On lap 1 of the 1939 Junior TT Race, Bob Foster riding an AJS stops at the Quarterbridge to fix broken goggles. Also, Bill Beevers and H.B.Myers both riding Velocette motor-cycles crash at the Quarterbridge on the same lap.
- During lap 3 of the Junior Race, Tyrell Smith slips of his Excelsior motor-cycle at Parliament Square in Ramsey and then continues after straightening the foot-rest. At the East Mountain Gate during lap 5, Marcel Simo collides with a post and crashes his Terrot motor-cycle. He suffers head and chest injuries and is taken to hospital. Also during lap 5, Freddie Frith retires at Ballaugh after holding 2nd place in the 1939 Junior TT Race.
- The 1939 Lightweight Race is held in mixed weather conditions. On lap 2 of the Lightweight Race, Jock McCredie riding an Excelsior retires at Ballaugh with engine problems. Lap 3 and Omobono Tenni riding a Moto Guzzi stops at Ballaugh to change a spark-plug and retires and his team-mate Stanley Woods retires on lap 5 with engine problems at Crosby.
- Following the 1939 Senior race, Race winner Georg Meier took the Senior TT trophy to Munich, Following the outbreak of World War 2 the Trophy was lost, It was eventually found in a BMW dealership in Russian-controlled Vienna, but careful negotiation with the Russians saw it return to the Island in time to be presented to Harold Daniell, the winner of the first post-war TT in 1947.

== Bibliography ==
- Willis, Roger (2009). The Nazi TT: Hitler's 1939 Propaganda Victory on the Isle of Man. Motobusiness. ISBN 978-0-9563212-0-6.
