= Ballaugh Bridge =

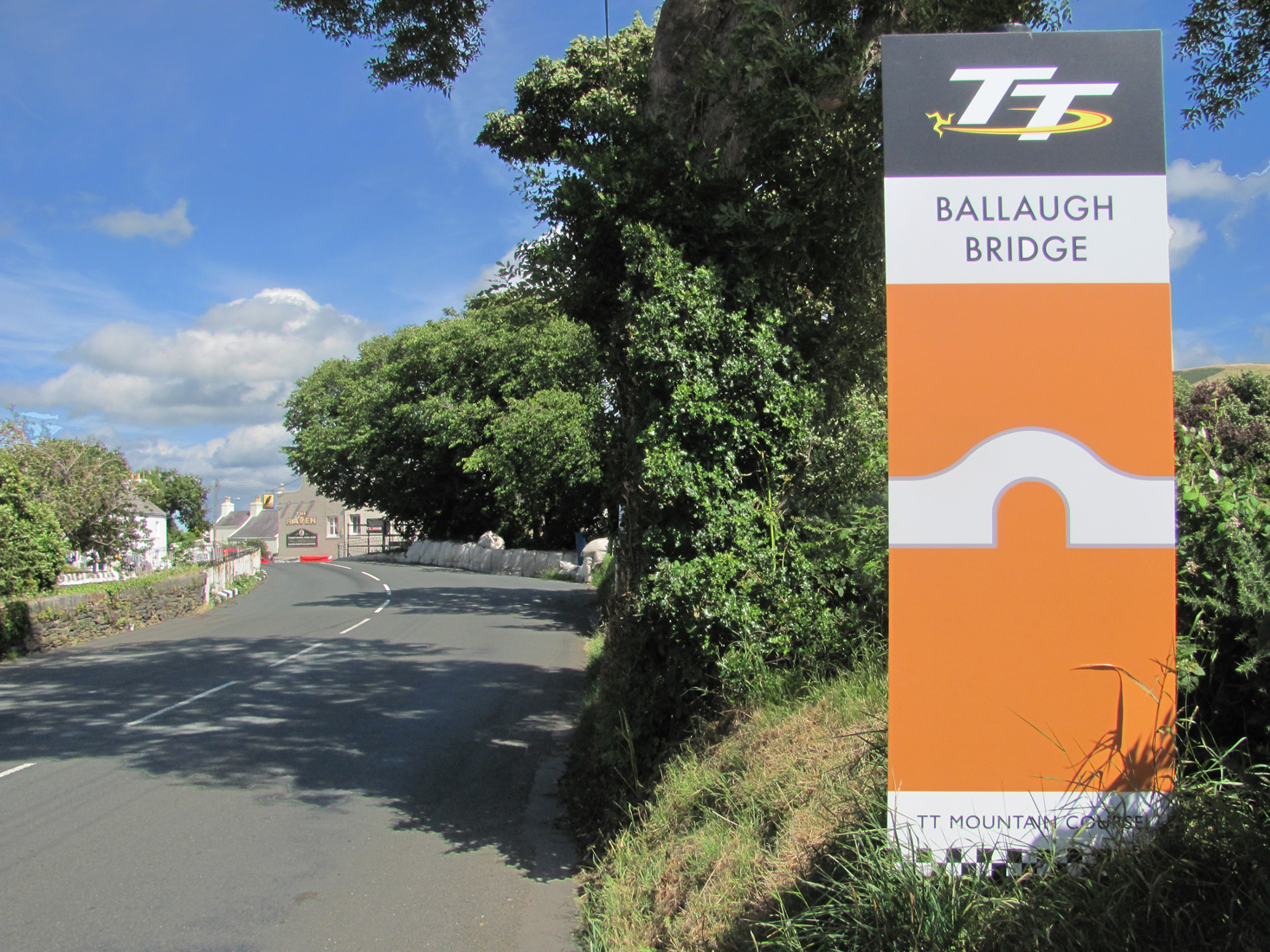

- Location within Isle of Man
- 54°18′34.8″N 4°32′29.2″W

History
- Built: c. 1739

Ballaugh Bridge is located on the primary A3 Castletown to Ramsey road and adjacent to the road junctions with the A10 Ballaugh to Ramsey coast road and the tertiary C37 Ballaugh Glen Road in the parish of Ballaugh in the Isle of Man.

== Description ==
Ballaugh Bridge is a hump-backed road bridge over the Ravensdale River, located in the village of Ballaugh.

== Motor-sport heritage ==
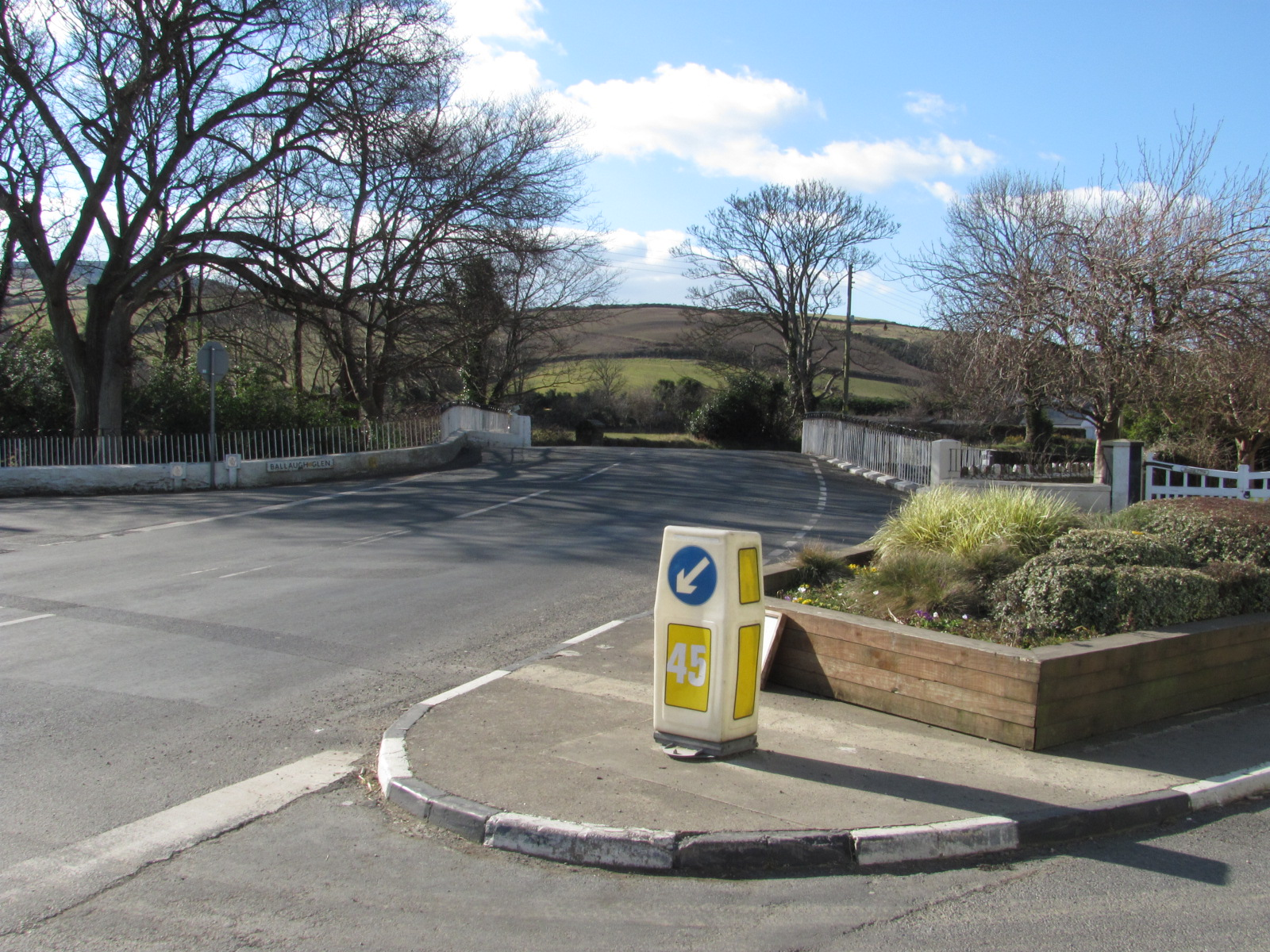
A3 Castletown to Ramsey Road at Ballaugh Bridge with the C37 Ballaugh Glen Road and the A10 Ballaugh Station Road

Ballaugh Bridge was part of the 52.15 mile Highland Course (amended to 40.38 miles in 1906) and the 37.50 Mile Four Inch Course used for automobile racing including the 1904 Gordon Bennett Trial and the RAC Tourist Trophy car races held between 1905 and 1922.

It was also the western edge of the Sandygate Loop for the 1904 Gordon Bennett British Eliminating Trial and the 1905 Tourist Trophy Race for automobiles. The 1906 Tourist Trophy Race used the Short Highroads Course, with the abandonment of the Sandygate Loop in favour of the A3 Castletown to Ramsey Road from Ballacraine corner to Ramsey.

In 1911, the Four Inch Course for automobiles was first used by the Auto-Cycling Union for the Isle of Man TT motor-cycle races. This included Ballaugh Bridge and the course later became known as the 37.73 mile Isle of Man TT Mountain Course which has been used since 1911 for the Isle of Man TT Races and from 1923 for the Manx Grand Prix races.

== Road improvements ==
The Bridge was subject to road widening and reprofiling during the winter of 1953/1954 for the 1954 Isle of Man TT races including the removal of a garden wall of the adjacent Ballaugh Railway Hotel (now the Raven Hotel). Ballaugh Bridge is the only remaining hump-backed bridge on the TT Course after the removal of Sulby Bridge in the 1920s and Ballig Bridge in 1935.

== Roadside memorial ==
Located near to Ballaugh Bridge is a road-side memorial to Karl Gall, a member of the pre-war works BMW motor-cycle team who died from injuries suffered after crashing near to the bridge during evening practice for the 1939 Isle of Man TT races.

== Gallery ==
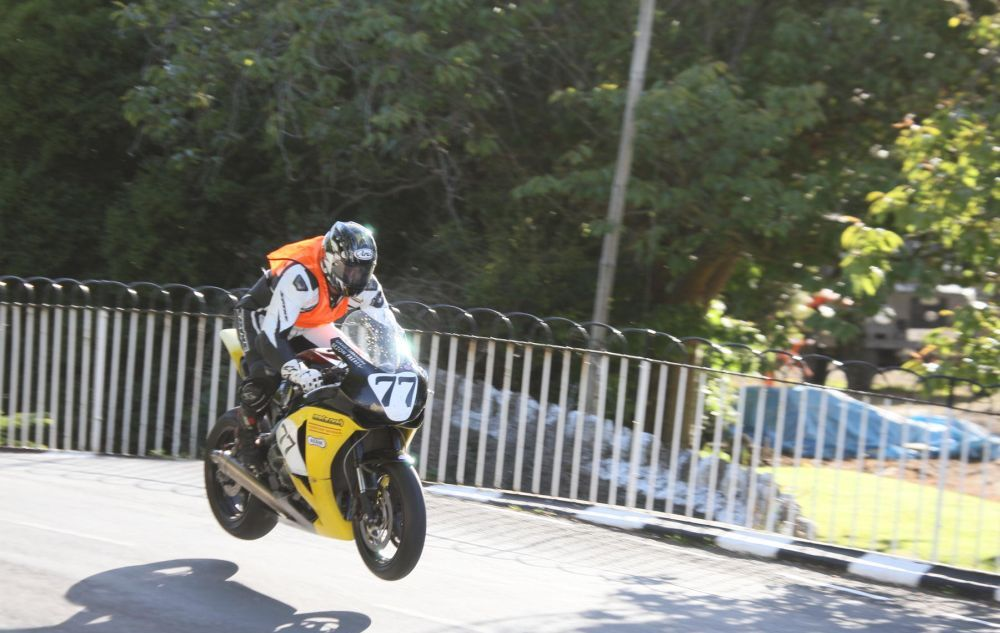
Hervé Gantner riding a motorcycle on Ballaugh Bridge.
