= Velocette KTT Mk VIII =

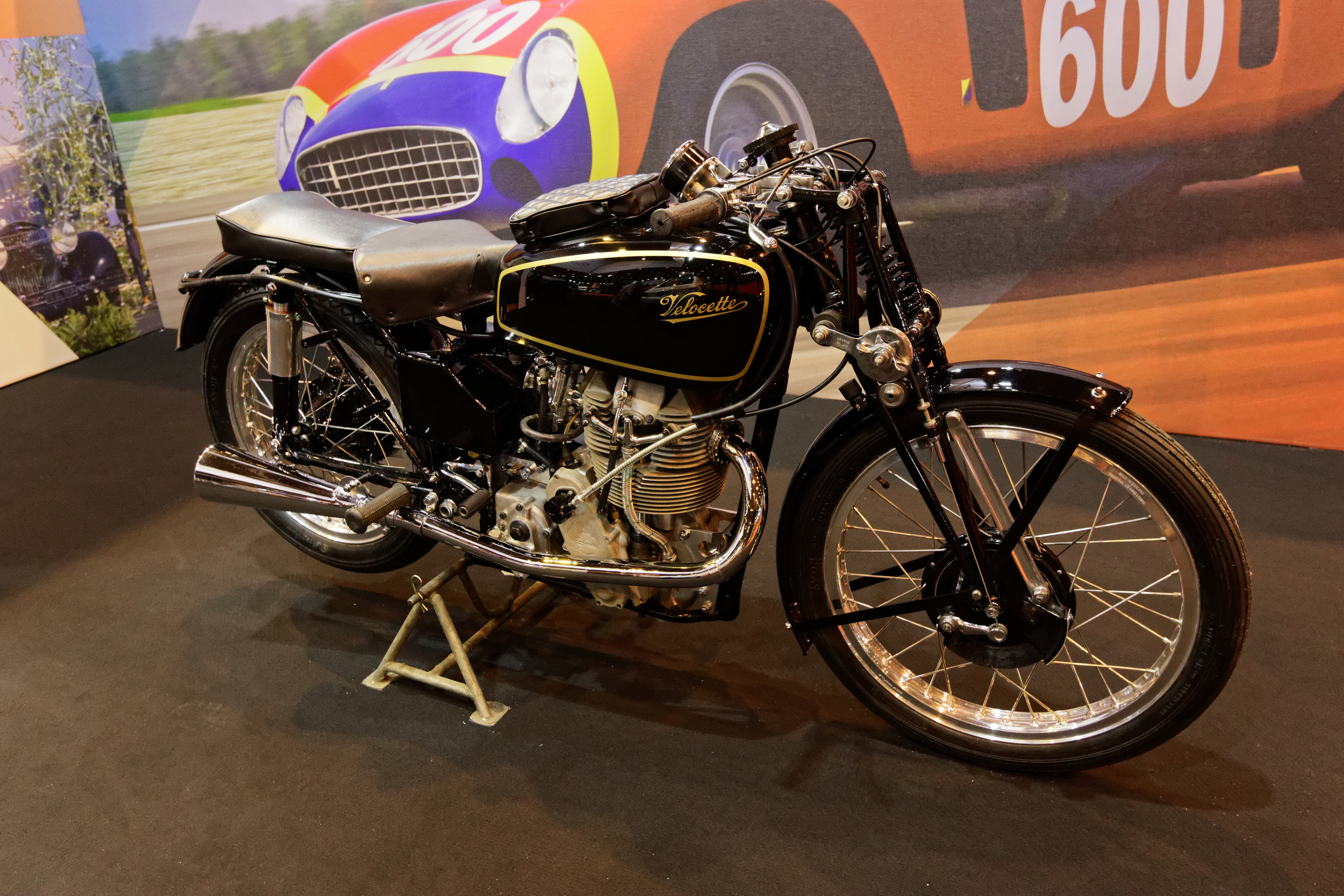
- Manufacturer: Velocette
- Production: 1938-1950; approx 240 built
- Predecessor: Velocette KTT Mark VII
- Engine: 348cc, OHC air cooled single
- Top speed: 115mph
- Power: 27hp @ 6500rpm
- Transmission: 4 speed, foot shift.
- Suspension: Front: Webb girder forks. Rear: swing-arm with Oleo air shocks.
- Brakes: Magnesium drum brakes, 7" dia. single leading shoe front and rear
- Tires: Frontl: 21" WM1, Rear: 19" WM2
- Fuel capacity: 4 gal.
- Oil capacity: 1 gal.

The Velocette KTT Mk VIII is a British racing motorcycle made by Veloce, Ltd. who built motorcycles named the Velocette. The Mk VIII KTT was ultimate development of their K series of overhead-camshaft 350cc machines introduced in 1925, and the TT designation indicated a production racing motorcycle, and a near replica of the factory race team machines. Production continued until 1950.

== Development ==
The final development of the Velocette KTT, the Mk VIII KTT was introduced in 1938 at that year's Earls Court Show, and was the first motorcycle to use the now-conventional swinging-arm rear fork with a shock absorber unit (in this case, an oleo-pneumatic unit built by the Oleo Strut Co. of England). The rear suspension system was designed by Veloce development engineer Harold Willis, and was inspired by the Oleo strut landing gear on the DeHavilland Hornet he borrowed at the Midland Aero Club, while his beloved DeHavilland 'Moth' was undergoing repair. Contact with the Oleo company led to several pairs of air shocks built for Veloce in 1936, for which the factory's racing rigid-frame racers (similar to the Mark VII KTT) were adapted with a swinging-fork rear end and bolt-on subframe for the seat. The experimental first swinging-arms used an adapted steering head lug turned sideways, with the cup-and-cone bearings retained. Production Mark VIII KTTs used a more conventional bronze bush and trunnion shaft pivot for the one-piece rear fork. The first experimental swing-arm machines were raced by the factory in the 1937 season, and introduced as the Mark VIII KTT the next year, for sale to the public.

The Mark VIII KTT was offered from 1938 to 1950, after which Veloce closed its racing department.

== See also ==
- Velocette
- Velocette KTT
