= BMW Type 255 =

BMW Type 255 Kompressor
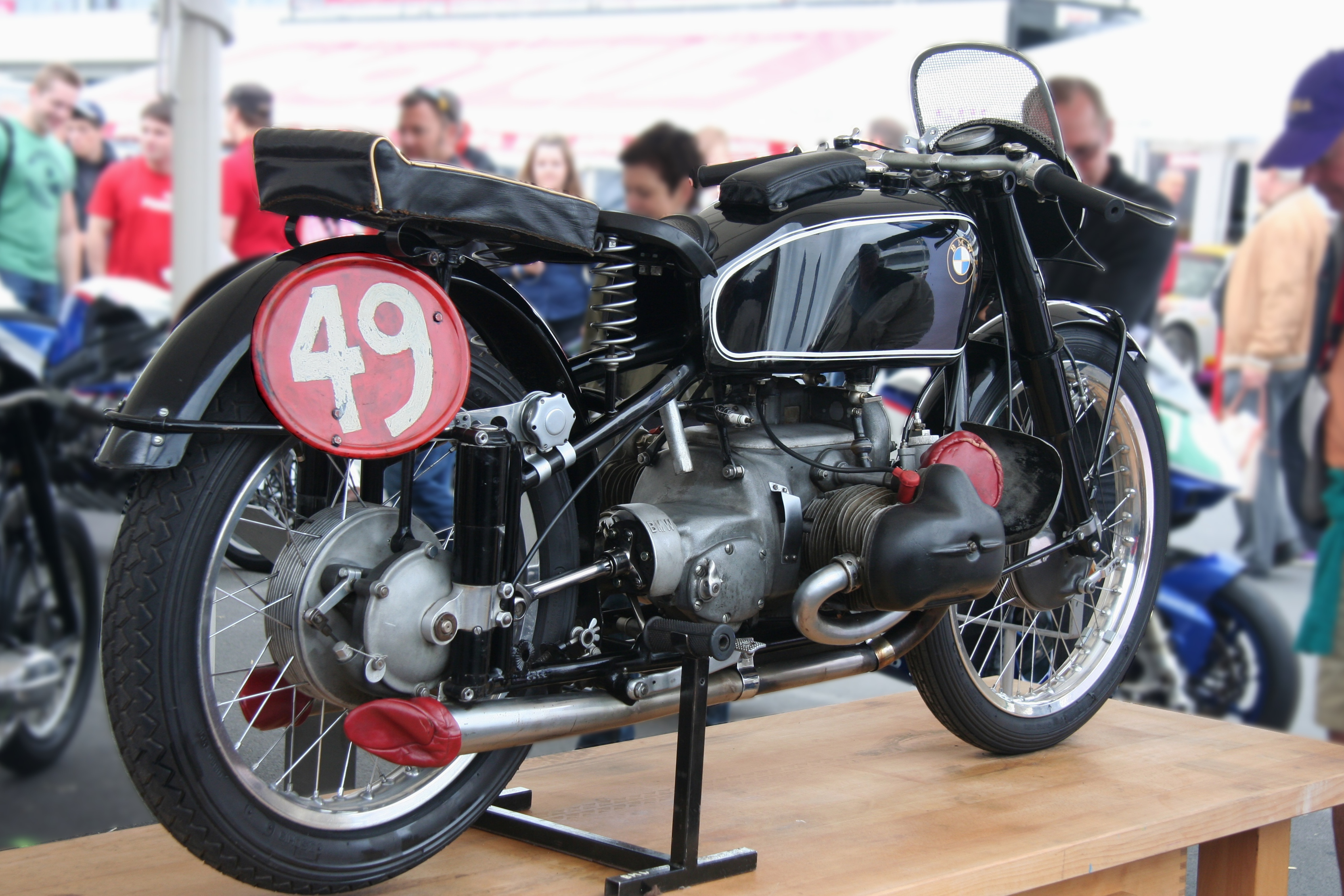
- Manufacturer: BMW Motorrad
- Also called: Type 255 RS 500
- Production: 1935–1939
- Predecessor: BMW WR 750
- Class: Street racing
- Engine: 492.6 cc (30.06 cu in) DOHC supercharged boxer twin with aluminium cylinders; magnesium engine block and supercharger casing Fuel: gasoline-oil mix
- Bore / stroke: 66 mm × 72 mm (2.6 in × 2.8 in)
- Top speed: c. 220 km/h (140 mph)
- Power: 60 hp (45 kW)
- Transmission: 4-speed, shaft drive
- Frame type: Tubular steel twin cradle
- Suspension: Front: Oil-filled telescopic forks Rear: Rigid (1935–1936) Plunger (after 1936)
- Weight: 138 kg (304 lb) (wet)

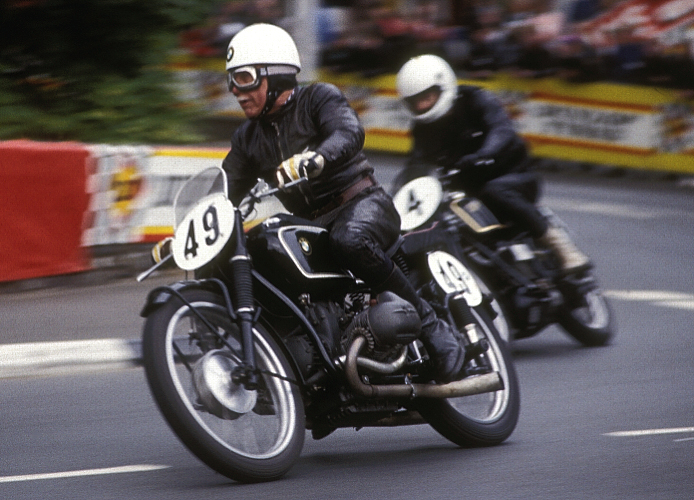
Georg Meier riding the 1939 BMW Type 255 Kompressor at the 1989 Isle of Man TT Race

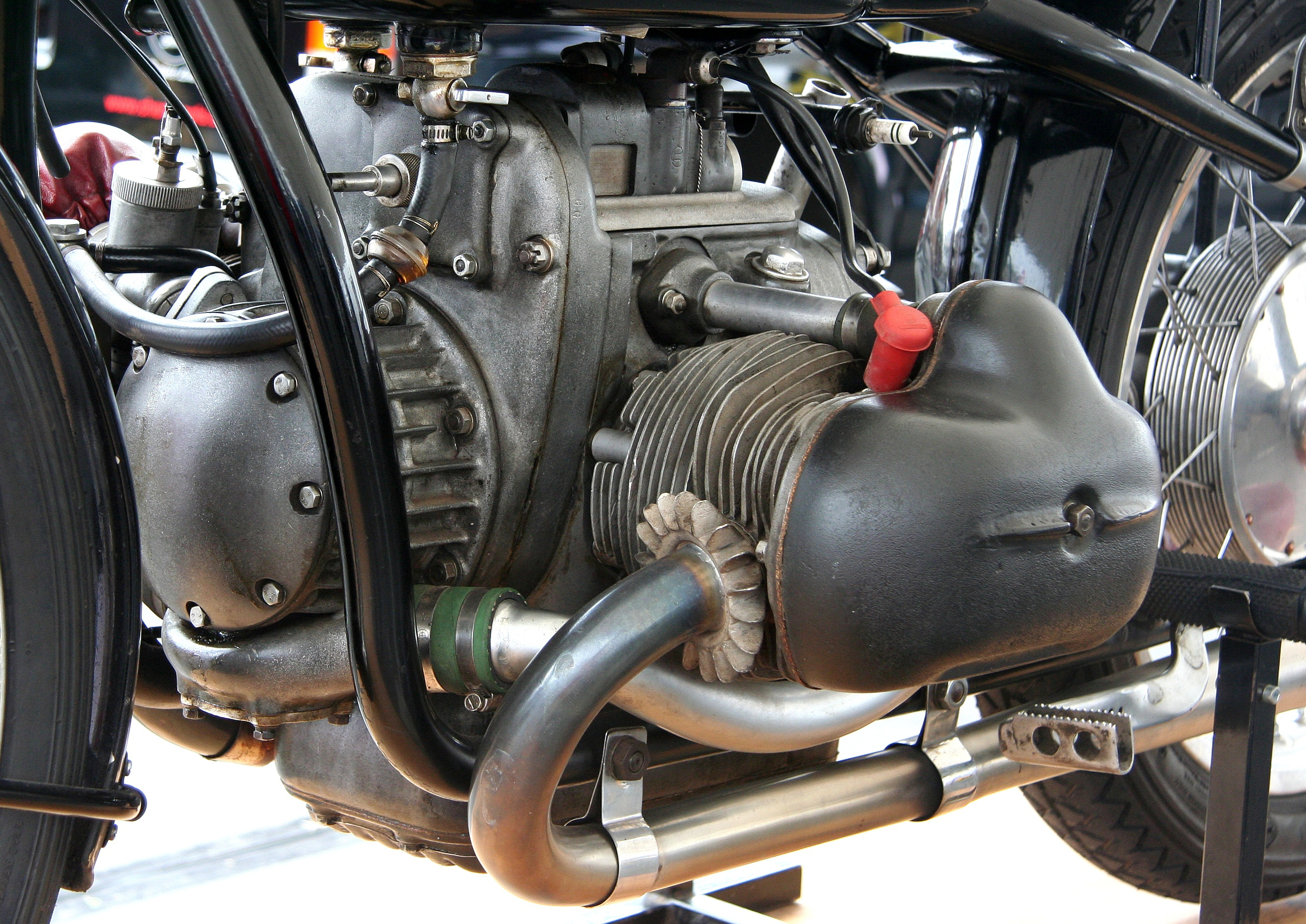
Supercharger-engine-gearbox unit construction assembly

BMW Type 255 Kompressor (also known as the 500 Kompressor, RS 255, RS255 and Type 255 RS 500) was a supercharged boxer twin race motorcycle from the 1930s. A BMW 255 Kompressor was ridden to victory by Georg Meier in the 1939 Isle of Man TT and the first win by a non-British competitor in the premier 500cc Senior TT class. A similar BMW 255 Kompressor machine was auctioned in 2013 for US$480,000, the second-highest price ever paid at auction for a motorcycle.

== Supercharger ==
A Zoller sliding vane supercharger is bolted to the front of the DOHC engine, driven directly by the crankshaft, and is lubricated by castor oil added to the fuel. It provided c. 15 psi (100 kPa).

== Records ==
The machine set a number of race records, including the first lap over 100 miles per hour (160 km/h) at a major event, when Georg Meier won the Belgian motorcycle Grand Prix in 1939, and Ernst Jakob Henne's capture of the motorcycle land-speed record in 1936 on a model with a streamlined fairing.

== Today ==
An example is on display at the BMW Museum in Munich.
