= Jock West =

British motorcycle racer

- West at the Vintage Motor Cycle Club's Founder's Day rally, race meeting and parade gathering, 27 April 1969
- Nationality: British
- Born: John Milns West; 28 February 1909; Belvedere, Kent
- Died: 6 June 2004 (aged 95)
Motorcycle racing career statistics
Grand Prix motorcycle racing
Active years	1949 - 1950
First race	1949 500cc Ulster Grand Prix
Last race	1950 500cc Ulster Grand Prix
Team(s)	Ariel, Triumph, BMW, AJS
Starts / Wins / Podiums / Poles / F. laps / Points; 2 / 0 / 0 / N/A / N/A / 7

John Milns West, MBE (28 February 1909 – 6 June 2004) was a Grand Prix motorcycle racer from Great Britain.

== Motorcycle career ==
West was born in Belvedere, Kent to an English father and a Scottish mother. He initially concentrated on grasstrack racing on an Ariel motorcycle and was successful enough that the Ariel factory would sponsor him at the 1931 Manx Grand Prix. West progressed to compete in the 1933 Isle of Man TT where he impressed Triumph manager Edward Turner, who hired him as a rider.

Afterwards, he took a job as sales manager for BMW. West rode a BMW to victory at the 1937 500cc Ulster Grand Prix held on the Clady Circuit. His win marked the first time that a non-British motorcycle had won the 500cc class at the Ulster Grand Prix. West returned the following year to win again at the 1938 Ulster Grand Prix. At the 1939 Isle of Man TT, he finished second behind his German BMW teammate Georg Meier in the Senior TT.

During the Second World War, West served in the Royal Air Force, rising to the rank of Wing Commander. He managed factories where crashed and damaged aircraft were rebuilt for combat and, was awarded the Order of the British Empire. After the war, he joined Associated Motor Cycles as a sales director. AJS had developed a new race bike known as the AJS Porcupine and West was the first person to ride the machine. He entered the 1947 Isle of Man TT with the bike but, teething problems relegated him to a 15th place although, he recorded the third fastest lap time. Leslie Graham would later ride the AJS Porcupine to win the inaugural 1949 FIM 500cc world championship.

After a fifth-place finish in the 1950 Ulster Grand Prix, West retired from racing at the age of 41. He continued to work for Associated Motor Cycles until 1961 and later rejoined BMW.

== Career statistics ==
=== By season ===
Season	Class	Motorcycle	Race	Win	Podium	Pole	FLap	Pts	Plcd
1949	500cc	AJS	1	0	0	0	0	5	10th
1950	500cc	AJS	1	0	0	0	0	2	14th
Total			2	0	0	0	0	7	
