= Bohumil Staša =

Czech motorcycle racer (1944–2019)

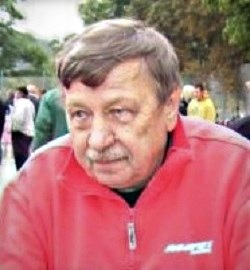
- Bohumil Staša
- Nationality: (Czechoslovakia) Czech
Motorcycle racing career statistics
Grand Prix motorcycle racing
Active years	1961, 1967–1969, 1971, 1973
First race	1961 350cc East German Grand Prix
Last race	1973 500cc Czechoslovak Grand Prix
Team	ČZ
Starts / Wins / Podiums / Poles / F. laps / Points; 23 / 0 / 3 / N/A / N/A / 66

Bohumil Staša (29 April 1944 – 21 May 2019) was a Czech motorcycle road racer. Staša began his Grand Prix career in 1961. He enjoyed his best seasons as a rider for the ČZ factory racing team in 1968 and 1969, when he finished both seasons in eighth place in the 350cc world championship.

== Motorcycle Grand Prix results ==
Points system from 1950 to 1968:

Position	1	2	3	4	5	6
Points	8	6	4	3	2	1

Points system from 1969 onwards:

Position	1	2	3	4	5	6	7	8	9	10
Points	15	12	10	8	6	5	4	3	2	1

(key) (Races in italics indicate fastest lap)

Year	Class	Team	1	2	3	4	5	6	7	8	9	10	11	12	13	Points	Rank	Wins
1961	350cc	Jawa		GER -		IOM -	NED -		DDR; 2	ULS -	NAT -	SWE -				?	?	0
1967	350 cc	Jawa		GER -		IOM -	NED; 11		DDR -	TCH; 6		ULS -	NAT -		JPN -	1	17th	0
1968	350cc	Jawa	GER; 6		IOM -	NED; 4		DDR -	TCH -		ULS -	NAT; 4				7	8th	0
1968	500cc	Jawa	GER; 5	ESP -	IOM -	NED; Ret	BEL; 13	DDR -	TCH -	FIN -	ULS -	NAT; Ret				2	21st	0
1969	350cc	Jawa	ESP -	GER; 7		IOM -	NED -		DDR; 5	TCH; 6	FIN -	ULS -	NAT; 7	YUG; 4		27	8th	0
1969	500cc	Jawa	ESP -	GER -	FRA -	IOM -	NED; 12	BEL -	DDR -	TCH; 3	FIN -	ULS; 9	NAT -	YUG -		11	18th	0
1971	350cc	ČZ	AUT; 11	GER -	IOM -	NED -	BEL -	DDR -	TCH; 2	SWE -	FIN -	ULS -	NAT -	ESP -		12	16th	0
1972	500cc	ČZ	GER -	FRA -	AUT; Ret	NAT; Ret	IOM -	YUG -	NED -	BEL -	DDR -	TCH; Ret	SWE -	FIN -	ESP -	0	-	0
1973	500cc	Yamaha	FRA -	AUT -	GER -	NAT; C	IOM -	YUG -	NED -	BEL -	TCH; 6	SWE -	FIN -	ESP; Ret		5	31st	0
1984	500cc	Suzuki	RSA -	NAT -	ESP -	AUT -	GER -	FRA -	YUG; 25	NED -	BEL -	GBR -	SWE -	RSM -		0	-	0
1985	500cc	Honda	RSA -	ESP -	GER; 29	NAT -	AUT -	YUG; Ret	NED -	BEL -	FRA -	GBR -	SWE -	RSM -		0	-	0
1986	500cc	Honda	ESP -	NAT -	GER; Ret	AUT -	YUG -	NED -	BEL -	FRA -	GBR -	SWE -	RSM -			0	-	0
