= 1967 Isle of Man TT =

Annual motorcycle racing event

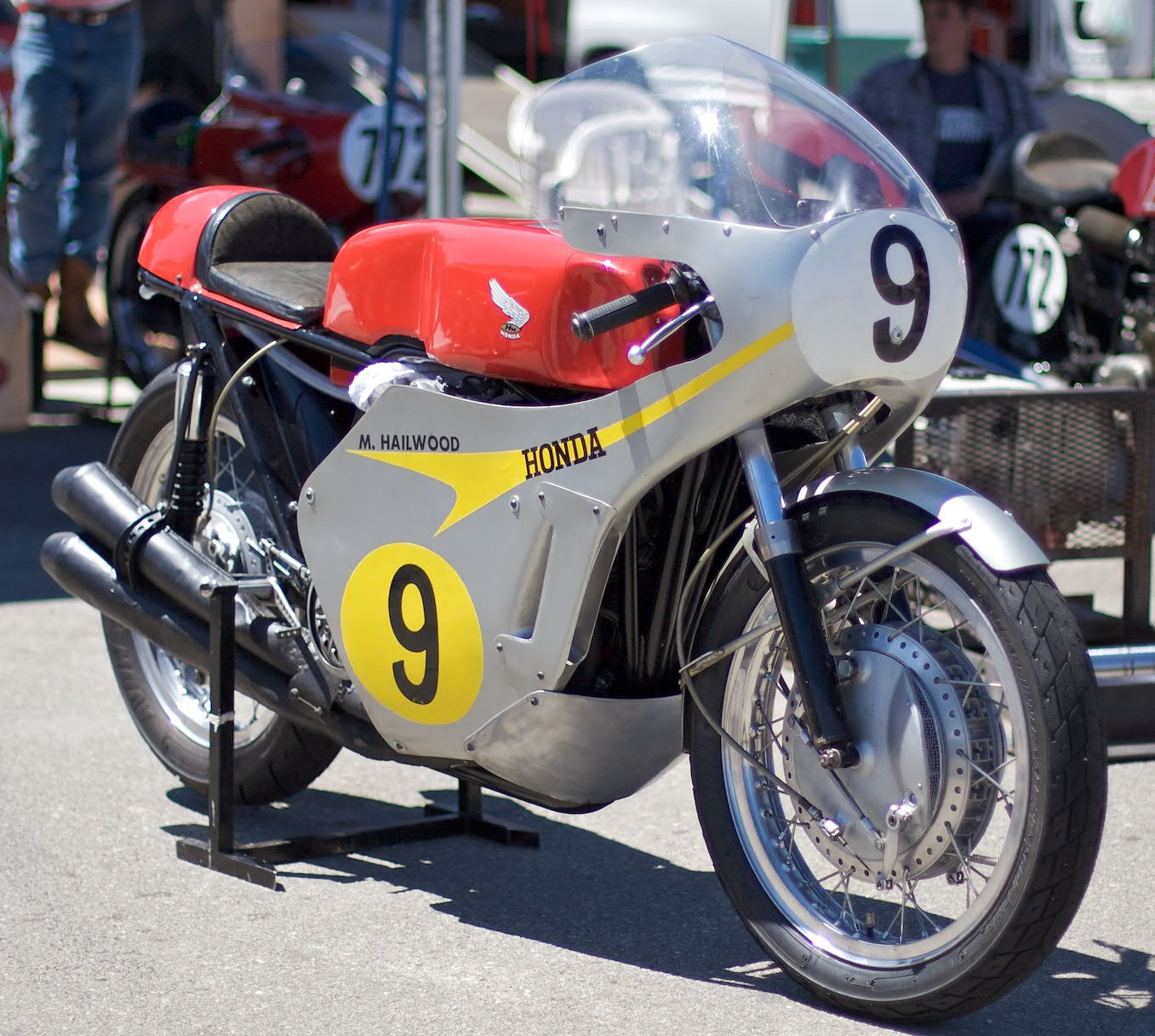
Hailwood's Honda 500

The 1967 Isle of Man Tourist Trophy was a motorcycle road racing event held on the 37-mile Snaefell Mountain course on the Isle of Man. Five races, in different engine capacity classes of 50, 125, 250, 350 and the 500 cc Senior TT, made up the second round of the FIM World Grand Prix motorcycling championship season (now known as MotoGP). Mike Hailwood, on the four-cylinder Honda RC181, duelled with Giacomo Agostini's MV Agusta 500 Three.

Agostini broke Hailwood's lap record on the first lap of the race at a speed of 108.38 mph (174.42 km/h). Hailwood responded with a second lap at 108.77 mph (175.05 km/h) but Agostini still led by 8.6 seconds. At the halfway pit stop of the six-lap race, Hailwood had cut Agostini's lead to a couple of seconds, but he then lost time adjusting his twist grip back into place. Agostini's lead was back up to 11.6 seconds. It was a battle as Hailwood, riding near to his limit, pursued the Italian rider. By the fifth lap, Hailwood had made up the difference and the riders appeared close to a dead heat, with the closest of finishes appearing likely.

Then disaster struck Agostini on the mountain section when his chain broke at the Windy Corner. He was able to coast back to the pits, but he was disqualified for missing Governor's Dip before coasting down to the pits. Hailwood went on to win at a record 105.62 mph (169.98 km/h). His lap record stood for eight years, and was only beaten in 1975 by Mick Grant on an improved circuit riding a larger-engined Kawasaki KR750. Hailwood's original Honda RC181 500 cc four-cylinder bike is owned by the Hailwood Trust and occasionally demonstrated at public events by his son David.

== 1967 Isle of Man Production 750 cc TT final standings ==
10 June 1967 – 3 laps (113 miles (182 km)) Mountain Course.

Rank	Rider	Team	Speed	Time
1	(United Kingdom) John Hartle	Triumph	97.10 mph (156.27 km/h)	1.09.56.8
2	(United Kingdom) Paul Smart	Norton	94.60 mph (152.24 km/h)	1.11.48.0
3	(United Kingdom) Tony Smith	BSA	89.73 mph (144.41 km/h)	1.15.42.0
4	(United States) Lance Weil	Triumph	89.66 mph (144.29 km/h)	1.15.45.8
5	(United Kingdom) Paul Butler	Triumph	88.83 mph (142.96 km/h)	1.16.28.0
6	(United Kingdom) Tony Godfrey	Norton	87.89 mph (141.45 km/h)	1.17.22.0
7	(United Kingdom) Graham Bailey	Triumph	84.47 mph (135.94 km/h)	1.20.11.8
8	(United Kingdom) Melvyn Rice	BSA	80.93 mph (130.24 km/h)	1.23.55.8
9	(United Kingdom) Tony McGurk	Triumph	80.60 mph (129.71 km/h)	1.24.16.6
10	(Netherlands) Jan R Strijbis	Triumph	80.51 mph (129.57 km/h)	1.24.22.2

== 1967 Isle of Man Production 500 cc TT final standings ==
10 June 1967 – 3 laps (113 miles (182 km)) Mountain Course.

Rank	Rider	Team	Speed	Time
1	(Isle of Man) Neil Kelly	Velocette	89.89 mph (144.66 km/h)	1.15.33.8
2	(United Kingdom) Keith Heckles	Velocette	89.15 mph (143.47 km/h)	1.16.11.6
3	(United Kingdom) David Nixon	Triumph	85.11 mph (136.97 km/h)	1.19.48.0

== 1967 Isle of Man Production 250 cc TT final standings ==
10 June 1967 – 3 laps (113 miles (182 km)) Mountain Course.

Rank	Rider	Team	Speed	Time
1	(United Kingdom) Bill Smith	Bultaco	88.63 mph (142.64 km/h)	1.16.38.2
2	(Northern Ireland) Tommy Robb	Bultaco	88.62 mph (142.62 km/h)	1.16.38.6
3	(Australia) Barry Smith	Suzuki	86.29 mph (138.87 km/h)	1.18.43.2

== 1967 Isle of Man Sidecar TT final standings ==
12 June 1967 – 3 laps (113 miles (182 km)) Mountain Course.

Place	Rider	Number	Country	Machine	Speed	Time	Points
1	(West Germany) Siegfried Schauzu/H.Schneider	12	Germany	BMW	90.96 mph (146.39 km/h)	1:14.40.06	8
2	(West Germany) Klaus Enders/Ralf Engelhardt	8	Germany	BMW	90.58 mph (145.77 km/h)	1:14.59.2	6
3	(United Kingdom) Colin Seeley/R.Lindsay	4	Britain	BMW	87.92 mph (141.49 km/h)	1:17.15.6	4
4	(United Kingdom) Pip Harris/J.Thornton	17	Britain	BMW	86.83 mph (139.74 km/h)	1:18.13.6	3
5	(United Kingdom) Barry Dungworth/N.Caddow	1	Britain	BMW	85.50 mph (137.60 km/h)	1:19.49.4	2
6	(United Kingdom) Terry Vinicombe/J.Flaxman	5	Britain	Kirby – BSA	84.11 mph (135.36 km/h)	1:20.45.6	1

== 1967 Isle of Man Lightweight TT 250cc final standings ==
12 June 1967 – 6 laps (226.38 miles (364.32 km)) Mountain Course.

Place	Rider	Number	Country	Machine	Speed	Points
1	(United Kingdom) Mike Hailwood	7	Britain	Honda	103.07 mph (165.88 km/h)	8
2	(United Kingdom) Phil Read	14	Britain	Yamaha	102.05 mph (164.23 km/h)	6
3	(United Kingdom) Ralph Bryans	1	Britain	Honda	99.55 mph (160.21 km/h)	4
4	(United Kingdom) Dave Simmonds	12	Britain	Kawasaki	92.53 mph (148.91 km/h)	3
5	(United Kingdom) Bill Smith	9	Britain	Kawasaki	89.28 mph (143.68 km/h)	2
6	(United Kingdom) Mick Chatterton	50	Britain	Yamaha	89.13 mph (143.44 km/h)	1

== 1967 Isle of Man Lightweight TT 125cc final standings ==
14 June 1967 – 3 laps (113 miles (182 km)) Mountain Course.

Place	Rider	Number	Country	Machine	Speed	Points
1	(United Kingdom) Phil Read	10	Britain	Yamaha	97.48 mph (156.88 km/h)	8
2	(United Kingdom) Stuart Graham	2	Britain	Suzuki	97.40 mph (156.75 km/h)	6
3	(Japan) Akiyasu Motohashi	12	Japan	Yamaha	94.56 mph (152.18 km/h)	4
4	(United Kingdom) Dave Simmonds	8	Britain	Kawasaki	92.08 mph (148.19 km/h)	3
5	(Australia) Kel Carruthers	16	Australia	Honda	87.40 mph (140.66 km/h)	2
6	(United Kingdom) Jim Curry	19	Britain	Honda	86.97 mph (139.96 km/h)	1

== 1967 Isle of Man Junior TT 350cc final standings ==
14 June 1967 – 6 laps (226.38 miles (364.32 km)) Mountain Course.

Place	Rider	Number	Country	Machine	Speed	Points
1	(United Kingdom) Mike Hailwood	3	Britain	Honda RC174	104.68 mph (168.47 km/h)	8
2	(Italy) Giacomo Agostini	6	Italy	MV Agusta	102.28 mph (164.60 km/h)	6
3	(United Kingdom) Derek Woodman	4	Britain	MZ	96.41 mph (155.16 km/h)	4
4	(Italy) Alberto Pagani	32	Italy	Aermacchi	94.91 mph (152.74 km/h)	3
5	(United Kingdom) Chris Conn	2	Britain	Aermacchi	94.77 mph (152.52 km/h)	2
6	(Italy) Gilberto Milani	33	Italy	Aermacchi	94.19 mph (151.58 km/h)	1

== 1967 Isle of Man TT 50cc final standings ==
16 June 1967 – 3 laps (113 miles (182 km)) Mountain Course.

Place	Rider	Number	Country	Machine	Speed	Points
1	(United Kingdom) Stuart Graham	2	Britain	Suzuki	82.89 mph (133.40 km/h)	8
2	(West Germany) Hans-Georg Anscheidt	1	Germany	Suzuki	81.86 mph (131.74 km/h)	6
3	(United Kingdom) Tommy Robb		Britain	Suzuki	69.28 mph (111.50 km/h)	4
4	(United Kingdom) Chris Walpole	27	Britain	Honda	66.57 mph (107.13 km/h)	3
5	(United Kingdom) Ernie L Griffiths	19	Britain	Honda	66.50 mph (107.02 km/h)	2
6	(United Kingdom) Stan G W Lawley	20	Britain	Honda	65.37 mph (105.20 km/h)	1

== 1967 Isle of Man Senior TT 500cc final standings ==
16 June 1967 – 6 laps (226.38 miles (364.32 km)) TT Mountain Course.

Place	Rider	Number	Country	Machine	Speed	Points
1	(United Kingdom) Mike Hailwood	4	Britain	Honda RC181	105.62 mph (169.98 km/h)	8
2	(United Kingdom) Peter Williams	8	Britain	Matchless G50	99.64 mph (160.36 km/h)	6
3	(United Kingdom) Steve Spencer	32	Britain	Lancefield Norton	98.59 mph (158.67 km/h)	4
4	(United Kingdom) John Cooper	11	Britain	Norton	98.20 mph (158.04 km/h)	3
5	(United Kingdom) Fred Stevens	26	Britain	Paton	97.32 mph (156.62 km/h)	2
6	(United Kingdom) John Hartle	14	Britain	Matchless	97.14 mph (156.33 km/h)	1
