= Opatija Circuit =

Motorsport circuit in Croatia

- Grand Prix Circuit (1931–1977)
- Location: Opatija, Croatia
- Coordinates: 45°21′08″N 14°20′00″E
- Opened: 1931
- Closed: 1977
- Former names: Preluk Circuit (1946–1977); Circuito di Abbazia (1931–1939); Circuito di Carnaro (1931–1939)
- Major events: Grand Prix motorcycle racing Yugoslavian motorcycle Grand Prix (1969–1970, 1972–1977)

Grand Prix Circuit (1931–1977)
- Length: 6.000 km (3.728 mi)
- Turns: 21
- Race lap record: 2:13.700 ( (Japan) Takazumi Katayama, Yamaha TZ 350, 1977, 350cc)

Opatija Circuit, also known as Preluk Circuit and the Kvarner Circuit, was a motorsport street circuit in Opatija, Croatia. The circuit used the city streets of the seaside resort situated on the Kvarner Gulf between 1931 and 1977. It was known as the "Monaco" of the Grand Prix motorcycle racing circuit because of its dramatic views of the Adriatic Sea.

== Circuit history ==
The circuit was first known as the "Circuito di Abbazia" when it began to host local auto races beginning in 1931 when Opatija was known as Abbazia and was a part of Italy. It has alternately been known as the "Circuito di Carnaro" (Kvarner Circuit). The circuit's layout was comparable to that of the Monaco Grand Prix course but faster and longer at 6.000 km (3.728 mi) in length and with 85 m (279 ft) of elevation changes. The race course presented an impressive challenge for competitors, starting on the beachfront corniche and winding up a steep hill with a rock face on one side and a sheer drop to the sea, protected by a stone wall, on the other. Then came a fast downhill straight, a hairpin turn, another straight followed by a series of downhill S Curves and back to the pits on the waterfront.

The venue first gained international prominence when it hosted the 1939 Adriatic Grand Prix won by Luigi Villoresi driving a Maserati 4CL. The area became part of Yugoslavia after the Second World War. Racing resumed after the war with local motorcycle races being held at the circuit in 1946. The following year, the circuit hosted a round of the Yugoslavian motorcycle national championship. By 1950 car racing also returned with sportscar races between 1950 and 1959, Formula Junior races in 1960, 1961 and 1963, and Formula 3 races between 1964 and 1968.

In 1961, the 50cc race formed the fifth round of the FIM European Championships, won by German rider Hans-Georg Anscheidt on a Kreidler. From 1969 to 1977, the venue hosted the Yugoslavian Grand Prix as part of the Grand Prix motorcycle racing world championship. When Godfrey Nash rode a Norton Manx to victory at the 1969 Yugoslavian Grand Prix at Opatija, it marked the last victory for a single-cylinder machine in a 500cc Grand Prix.

Despite the circuit's scenic setting, it was an unsafe race track due to high speeds on narrow roads coupled with numerous unmovable roadside obstacles, such as trees, stone walls, lampposts, electric poles, embankments, houses, and the Adriatic Sea. In this regard, the circuit gained a reputation similar to that of the Isle of Man TT circuit. The safety situation became untenable for cars and the last auto race held on the circuit was the 1968 Formula 3 Gran Premio Adriatico won by Manfred Mohr driving a Tecno 68. Despite the risks, motorcycle races continued to be held.

During the 1973 motorcycle racing season, in the aftermath of the deaths of Jarno Saarinen and Renzo Pasolini at the Nations Grand Prix, several racing teams including Yamaha, Harley Davidson and MV Agusta, boycotted the Yugoslavian Grand Prix due to unsafe track conditions. Other riders chose to compete, but with less than their full efforts. In 1974, British rider Billie Nelson crashed into the crowd during the 250cc race, injuring several spectators. He died later that night at a hospital.

== Final days of venue ==
The Yugoslavian Grand Prix promoters had received an ultimatum from the FIM before the 1977 Yugoslavian Grand Prix race that, if they did not improve the safety of the circuit, the event would be canceled. The event was a disaster with Italian rider, Giovanni Ziggiotto, crashing during practice for the 250cc race when his motorcycle's engine seized and he was hit from behind by Per-Edward Carlson. He died four days later in a hospital. During the 50 cc race, Ulrich Graf crashed when his bike developed a rear tire puncture and he was thrown into a rock wall. He suffered serious head injuries and died later in a hospital. The tragedy forced the venue off the Grand Prix schedule and the Yugoslavian Grand Prix was moved to the Rijeka Circuit for the 1978 season.

Racing activity was not to return to Opatija although the old circuit is occasionally used as a special stage during Croatian national rallies and for historic motorsport events.

== World Championship races ==
Period	Competition	Class	No. of races
1969–70; 1972–77 (8)	Grand Prix motorcycle racing (Yugoslavian motorcycle Grand Prix)	50cc	8
1969–70; 1972–77 (8)	Grand Prix motorcycle racing (Yugoslavian motorcycle Grand Prix)	125cc	8
1969–70; 1972–77 (8)	Grand Prix motorcycle racing (Yugoslavian motorcycle Grand Prix)	250cc	8
1969–70; 1972–77 (8)	Grand Prix motorcycle racing (Yugoslavian motorcycle Grand Prix)	350cc	8
1969–70; 1972–77 (8)	Grand Prix motorcycle racing (Yugoslavian motorcycle Grand Prix)	500cc	4?
1969–70; 1972–77 (8)	Grand Prix motorcycle racing (Yugoslavian motorcycle Grand Prix)	Sidecars 500cc	?

== Lap records ==
The fastest official race lap records at the Opatija Circuit are listed as:

Category	Time	Driver	Vehicle	Event
Grand Prix Circuit (1931–1977): 6.000 km (3.728 mi)
350cc	2:13.700	Takazumi Katayama	Yamaha TZ 350	1977 Yugoslavian motorcycle Grand Prix
250cc	2:19.200	Mario Lega	Morbidelli 250	1977 Yugoslavian motorcycle Grand Prix
500cc	2:20.600	Giacomo Agostini	MV Agusta 500 Three	1970 Yugoslavian motorcycle Grand Prix
125cc	2:25.100	Dieter Braun	Morbidelli 125	1975 Yugoslavian motorcycle Grand Prix
Formula Three	2:31.200	David Walker	Merlyn MK 10	1967 Adriatic Grand Prix
50cc	2:41.100	Ángel Nieto	Bultaco TSS 50	1977 Yugoslavian motorcycle Grand Prix
Sports car racing	2:44.600	Ernst Vogel	Porsche 550 RS Spyder	1958 Opatija Sports car race
Voiturette	2:45.200	Luigi Villoresi	Maserati 4CL	1939 Abbazia Voiturette race

== See also ==
- Automotodrom Grobnik
