= Dave Simmonds =

British motorcycle racer (1939–1972)

- Simmonds standing behind his historic 1971 Kawasaki triple 500 cc Grand Prix race machine with a special frame by Ken Sprayson, Development Engineer of Reynolds Tubes
- Nationality: British
Motorcycle racing career statistics
Grand Prix motorcycle racing
Active years	1963 - 1972
First race	1963 50cc 1965 Isle of Man TT
Last race	1972 500cc Spanish Grand Prix
First win	1969 125cc West German Grand Prix
Last win	1971 500cc Spanish Grand Prix
Team	Kawasaki
Championships	125cc - 1969
Starts / Wins / Podiums / Poles / F. laps / Points; 56 / 11 / 22 / N/A / 6 / 373

Dave Simmonds (25 October 1939 – 23 October 1972) was a British professional Grand Prix motorcycle road racer. He competed in the Grand Prix world championships from 1963 to 1972. Simmonds is notable for winning the 1969 125 cc FIM road racing world championship.

== Motorcycle racing career ==
Born in London, Simmonds began his motorcycle racing career riding a 50cc Itom motorcycle in 1960. By 1963 he had won the 125cc British road racing national championship on a Tohatsu which he kept racing with his brother Mike in the following seasons. His impressive results earned him an invitation from the Kawasaki factory to race one of their new 125cc motorcycles in the 1966 Japanese Grand Prix. Simmonds convinced Kawasaki management to loan him a motorcycle to compete in the 125cc Grand Prix world championships in 1967. In an era of unrestricted rules, the Kawasaki KA-1 125cc twin cylinder was outclassed by the expensive, RA31 V4 engines used by the Yamaha racing team and even the RT67 twins used by Suzuki and he finished 7th of the world championship. Without any financial or mechanical support from the Kawasaki factory, and just spare parts sent from time to time, Simmonds spent the 1967 and 1968 Grand Prix seasons sorting out the motorcycle's reliability issues.

End of 1967, the FIM announced a change in its regulations, applicable as from 1969 onwards, in an effort to reduce spiraling costs in motorcycle racing. 125cc machines would be limited to two cylinders and 6-speed transmissions. This regulation change caused the dominant Yamaha and Suzuki factories to withdraw their teams from Grand Prix racing. Simmonds and his aging Kawasaki won the 1969 125cc road racing world championship in an impressive fashion with only one race in which he failed to finish in either first or second place. The victory marked the first world championship for Kawasaki.

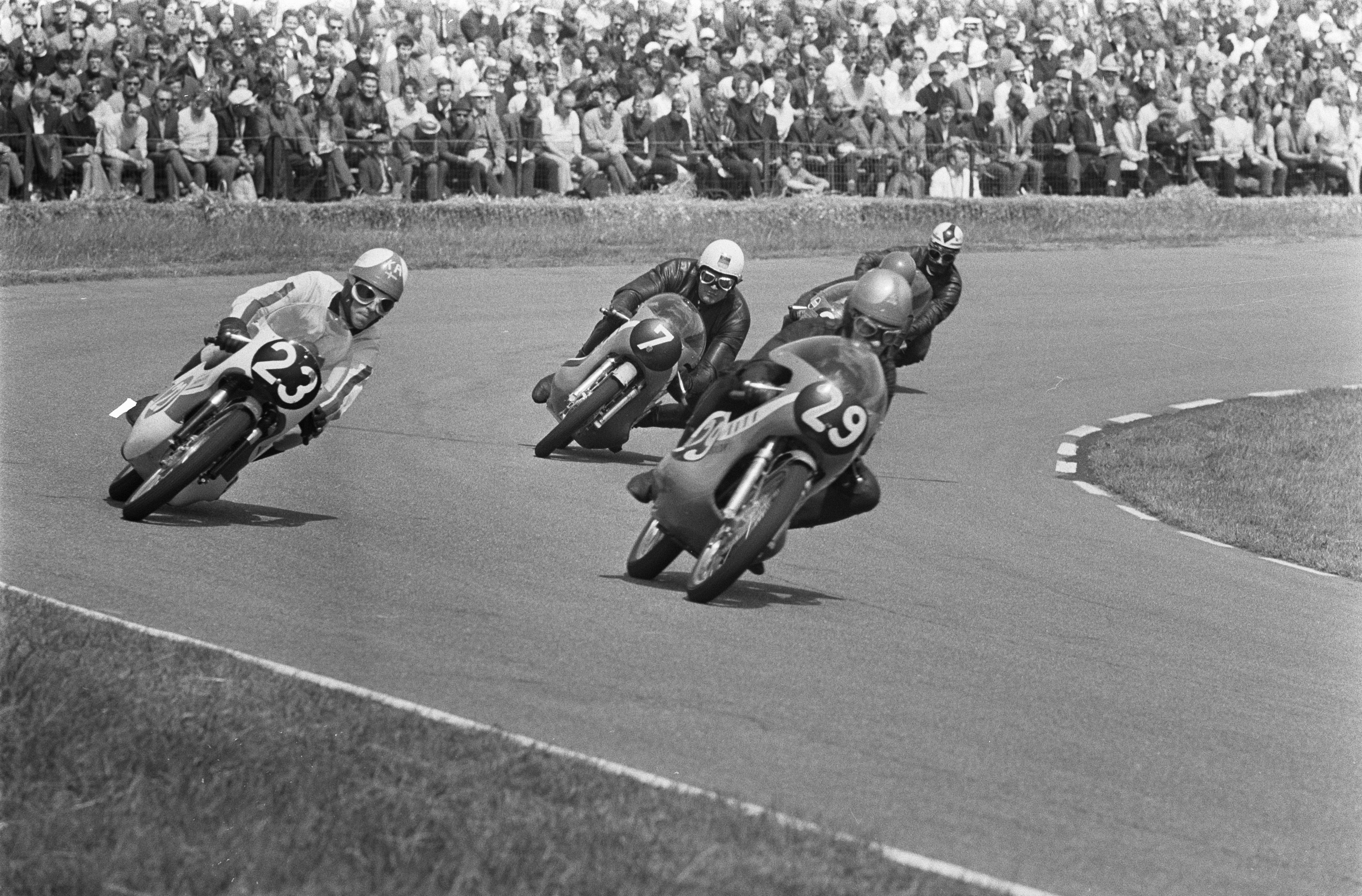
Cees van Dongen (29), leads the 1969 Dutch TT ahead of Kent Andersson (23), Dieter Braun (7) and an obscured rider while the eventual winner, Simmonds pursues from the rear.

Simmonds dropped to fourth place in 1970 with improved competition from Dieter Braun (Suzuki RT66), Ángel Nieto (Derbi) and Börje Jansson (Maico) but, still managed to win the Finnish Grand Prix and scored two second place finishes in the Dutch and Belgian Grands Prix. Simmonds finished sixth in the 1971 125cc world championship with one win at the German Grand Prix at the Hockenheimring.

In 1971, Simmonds competed in the premier 500cc class with a Kawasaki H1R. The H1R had poor road handling characteristics so, Simmonds had his H1R rebuilt around a Ken Sprayson-designed frame that greatly improved the machine's handling. He proved to be competitive by winning the preseason invitational 500cc Mettet Grand Prix then, finished second to Giacomo Agostini and the dominant MV Agusta at the Finnish Grand Prix followed by third places in Holland and Italy.

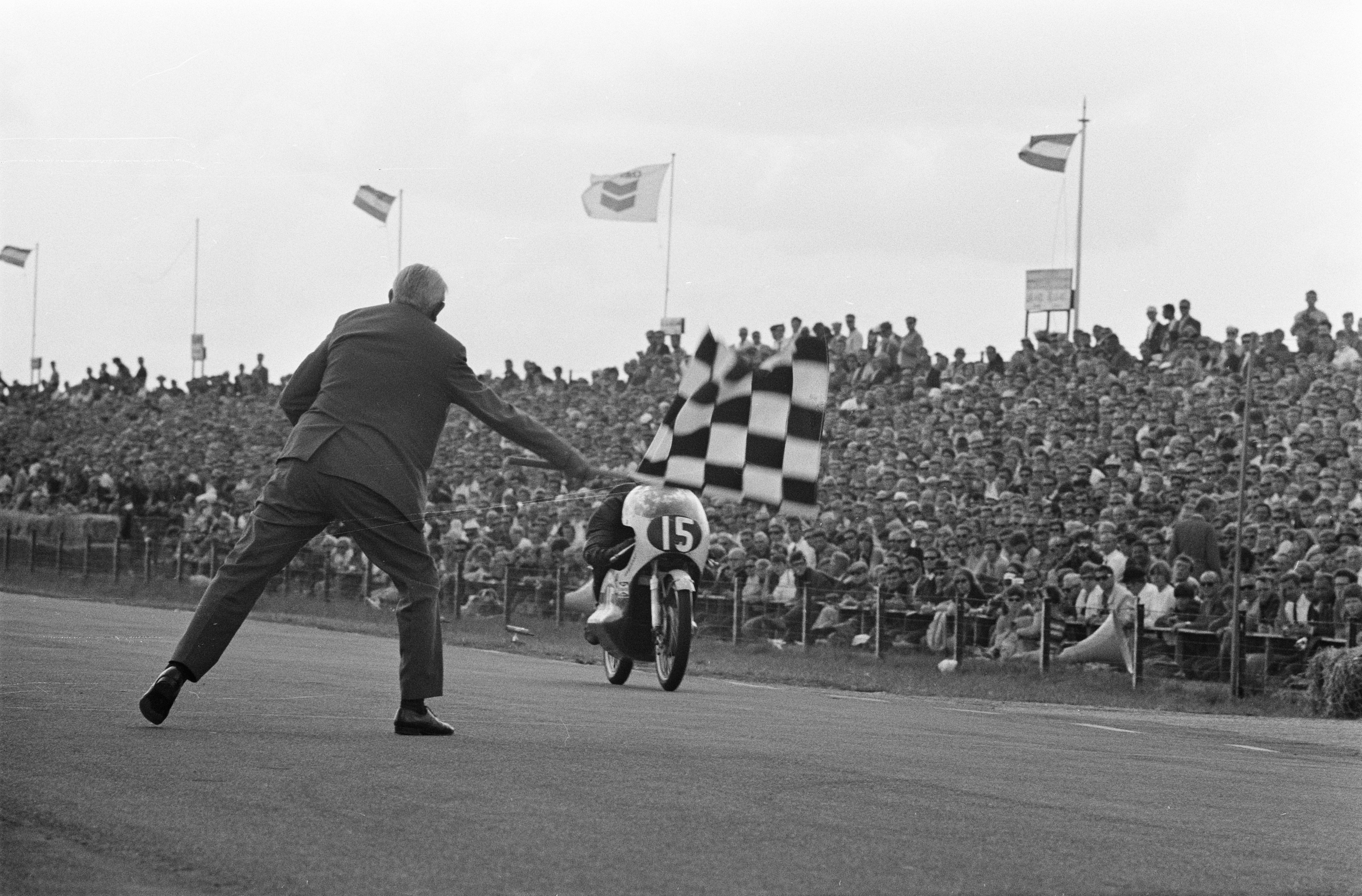
Simmonds crossing the finish line to win the 1969 125cc Dutch TT.

Simmonds won his first 500cc class victory at the season ending Spanish Grand Prix at Jarama when Agostini sat out the race after already winning the championship. His victory in Spain also marked Kawasaki's first premier-class Grand Prix victory. Simmonds ended the season ranked fourth in the 500cc World Championship despite missing four rounds. In 1972, seven years after first his first appearance on the 125cc Kawasaki, Simmonds would race the bike to a remarkable third place at the Dutch TT.

== Death ==
In 1972, while attending a non-championship motorcycle race at Rungis near Paris, Simmonds was killed in a fire caused by an exploding gas cylinder in a caravan owned by fellow racer Jack Findlay. Mistakenly thinking that Findlay's mother was inside the caravan, Simmonds rushed to help just as the gas cylinder exploded, engulfing him in flames.

== Grand Prix motorcycle racing results ==
Points system from 1950 to 1968:

**Position**	1	2	3	4	5	6
**Points**	8	6	4	3	2	1

Points system from 1969 onwards:

**Position**	1	2	3	4	5	6	7	8	9	10
**Points**	15	12	10	8	6	5	4	3	2	1

(key) (Races in bold indicate pole position; races in italics indicate fastest lap)

Year	Class	Team	1	2	3	4	5	6	7	8	9	10	11	12	13	Points	Rank	Wins
1963	50cc	Tohatsu	ESP -	GER -	FRA -	IOM; NC	NED -	BEL -			FIN -		ARG -	JPN -		0	-	0
1963	125cc	Tohatsu	ESP -	GER -	FRA -	IOM; 15	NED -	BEL -	ULS -	DDR -	FIN -	NAT -	ARG -	JPN -		0	-	0
1964	50cc	Tohatsu	USA -	ESP -	FRA -	IOM; 9	NED -	BEL -	GER -			FIN -		JPN -		0	-	0
1964	125cc	Tohatsu	USA -	ESP -	FRA -	IOM; 9	NED -		GER -	DDR -	ULS -	FIN -	NAT -	JPN -		0	-	0
1964	250cc	Greeves	USA -	ESP -	FRA -	IOM; NC	NED -	BEL -	GER -	DDR -	ULS -		NAT -	JPN -		0	-	0
1965	50cc	Tohatsu	USA -	GER -	ESP -	FRA -	IOM; NC	NED -	BEL -						JPN -	0	-	0
1965	125cc	Tohatsu	USA -	GER -	ESP -	FRA -	IOM; NC	NED -		DDR -	CZE -	ULS -	FIN -	NAT -	JPN -	0	-	0
1965	250cc	Honda	USA -	GER -	ESP -	FRA -	IOM; NC	NED -	BEL -	DDR -	CZE -	ULS -	FIN -	NAT -	JPN -	0	-	0
1965	350cc	Honda		GER -			IOM; NC	NED -		DDR -	CZE -	ULS -	FIN -	NAT -	JPN -	0	-	0
1966	50cc	Honda	ESP -	GER -		NED -						IOM; 6	NAT -	JPN -		1	13th	0
1966	125cc	Tohatsu	ESP -	GER -		NED -		DDR -	CZE -	FIN -	ULS -	IOM; NC	NAT -	JPN -		0	-	0
1966	250cc	Honda	ESP -	GER -	FRA -	NED -	BEL -	DDR -	CZE -	FIN -	ULS -	IOM; NC	NAT -	JPN -		0	-	0
1966	350cc	Honda		GER -	FRA -	NED -		DDR -	CZE -	FIN -	ULS; 5	IOM; 8	NAT -	JPN -		2	23rd	0
1967	125cc	Kawasaki	ESP -	GER -	FRA; 5	IOM; 4	NED -	BEL -	DDR -	CZE -	FIN; 3	ULS -	NAT -	CAN -	JPN -	3	14th	0
1967	250cc	Kawasaki	ESP -	GER -	FRA -	IOM; 4	NED; 5	BEL -	DDR -	CZE -	FIN -	ULS -	NAT -	CAN -	JPN -	5	10th	0
1967	350cc	Kawasaki		GER -		IOM; NC	NED -		DDR -	CZE -		ULS -	NAT -		JPN -	0	-	0
1968	125cc	Kawasaki	GER -	ESP -	IOM; NC	NED -		DDR -	CZE -	FIN -	ULS -	NAT; 4				3	14th	0
1968	350cc	Kawasaki	GER -		IOM; NC	NED; 6		DDR -	CZE -		ULS -	NAT -				1	18th	0
1969	125cc	Kawasaki	ESP -	GER; 1	FRA; 2	IOM; 1	NED; 1	BEL; 1	DDR; 1	CZE; 1	FIN; 1		NAT; 1	YUG; 2		90	**1st**	8
1969	250cc	Kawasaki	ESP -	GER -	FRA -	IOM; NC	NED -	BEL; 9	DDR -	CZE -	FIN -	ULS -	NAT; 8	YUG -		5	31st	0
1969	350cc	Kawasaki	ESP -	GER; 10		IOM; 17	NED -		DDR; 9	CZE -	FIN -	ULS -	NAT -	YUG -		3	40th	0
1970	125cc	Kawasaki	GER -	FRA; NC	YUG -	IOM; NC	NED; 2	BEL; 2	DDR; 4	CZE; 3	FIN; 1		NAT -	ESP -		57	4th	1
1970	500cc	Kawasaki	GER -	FRA; 12	YUG; 6	IOM -	NED -	BEL -	DDR; 8		FIN -	ULS -	NAT -	ESP; 9		10	20th	0
1971	125cc	Kawasaki	AUT -	GER; 1	IOM -	NED -	BEL -	DDR -	CZE; 4	SWE; 5	FIN; 5		NAT; 6	ESP; 4		48	6th	1
1971	250cc	Kawasaki	AUT -	GER -	IOM -	NED -	BEL -	DDR -	CZE; 9	SWE -	FIN -	ULS -	NAT -	ESP -		2	42nd	0
1971	500cc	Kawasaki	AUT -	GER -	IOM -	NED; 3	BEL -	DDR -		SWE; 6	FIN; 2	ULS -	NAT; 3	ESP; 1		52	4th	1
1972	125cc	Kawasaki	GER; 4	FRA; 4	AUT -	NAT -	IOM -	YUG -	NED; 3	BEL; 7	DDR -	CZE -	SWE -	FIN; 5	ESP; 4	44	6th	0
1972	500cc	Kawasaki	GER; 4	FRA -	AUT -	NAT -	IOM -	YUG -	NED; 4	BEL -	DDR -	CZE -	SWE; 4	FIN; 5	ESP; 2	42	7th	0
