= 1969 Grand Prix motorcycle racing season =

Sports season

1969 F.I.M. Grand Prix motorcycle racing season

Seasons
- ← 1968 1970 →

The 1969 Grand Prix motorcycle racing season was the 21st FIM Road Racing World Championship Grand Prix season. The season consisted of twelve Grand Prix races in six classes: 500cc, 350cc, 250cc, 125cc, 50cc and Sidecars 500cc. It began on 4 May, with Spanish Grand Prix and ended with Yugoslavian Grand Prix on 14 September.

== Season summary ==
Giacomo Agostini and the MV Agusta team faced little opposition in the larger displacement classes from any major manufacturers, competing largely against privateer racers using ageing machinery. He was briefly challenged by former 125 World Champion Bill Ivy riding a 350cc Jawa two-stroke, V-four engined motorcycle. Ivy led Agostini at the 1969 350cc Dutch TT before finishing in second place. Two weeks later, Ivy was killed in an accident during practice at the Sachsenring.

The 250 class saw a tight three-way battle go down to the last race with Benelli's Kel Carruthers coming out on top against Kent Andersson and Santiago Herrero. Carruther's win would mark the last time a four-stroke machine would win the 250 championship. Kawasaki claimed their first world title with Dave Simmonds winning the 125 class. Spain's Angel Nieto won his first world championship for Derbi. It would be the first of many for the Spaniard. Former 125 world champion Bill Ivy was killed in a crash when his Jawa seized during practice for the East German Grand Prix at the Sachsenring. When Godfrey Nash rode a Norton Manx to victory at the Yugoslavian Grand Prix at the Opatija Circuit, it would mark the last time that a 500cc Grand Prix race was won on a single-cylinder machine.

== 1969 Grand Prix season calendar ==
Round	Date	Grand Prix	Circuit	50cc winner	125cc winner	250cc winner	350cc winner	500cc winner	Sidecars 500cc winner	Report
1	4 May	(Spain) Spanish Grand Prix	Jarama	(Netherlands) Aalt Toersen	(Netherlands) Cees van Dongen	(Spain) Santiago Herrero	(Italy) Giacomo Agostini	(Italy) Giacomo Agostini		Report
2	11 May	(West Germany) West German Grand Prix	Hockenheimring	(Netherlands) Aalt Toersen	(United Kingdom) Dave Simmonds	(Sweden) Kent Andersson	(Italy) Giacomo Agostini	(Italy) Giacomo Agostini	(Germany) Enders / Engelhardt	Report
3	18 May	(France) French Grand Prix	Le Mans Bugatti	(Netherlands) Aalt Toersen	(France) Jean Auréal	(Spain) Santiago Herrero		(Italy) Giacomo Agostini	(Germany) Fath / Kalauch	Report
4	13 June	Isle of Man TT	Snaefell Mountain		(United Kingdom) Dave Simmonds	(Australia) Kel Carruthers	(Italy) Giacomo Agostini	(Italy) Giacomo Agostini	(Germany) Enders / Engelhardt	Report
5	28 June	(Netherlands) Dutch TT	TT Circuit Assen	(Australia) Barry Smith	(United Kingdom) Dave Simmonds	(Italy) Renzo Pasolini	(Italy) Giacomo Agostini	(Italy) Giacomo Agostini	(Germany) Fath / Kalauch	Report
6	6 July	(Belgium) Belgian Grand Prix	Spa-Francorchamps	(Australia) Barry Smith	(United Kingdom) Dave Simmonds	(Spain) Santiago Herrero		(Italy) Giacomo Agostini	(Germany) Fath / Kalauch	Report
7	13 July	(East Germany) East German Grand Prix	Sachsenring	(Spain) Angel Nieto	(United Kingdom) Dave Simmonds	(Italy) Renzo Pasolini	(Italy) Giacomo Agostini	(Italy) Giacomo Agostini		Report
8	20 July	(Czechoslovakia) Czechoslovak Grand Prix	Masaryk Circuit	(Netherlands) Paul Lodewijkx	(United Kingdom) Dave Simmonds	(Italy) Renzo Pasolini	(Italy) Giacomo Agostini	(Italy) Giacomo Agostini		Report
9	3 August	(Finland) Finnish Grand Prix	Imatra Circuit		(United Kingdom) Dave Simmonds	(Sweden) Kent Andersson	(Italy) Giacomo Agostini	(Italy) Giacomo Agostini	(Germany) Enders / Engelhardt	Report
10	16 August	(Northern Ireland) Ulster Grand Prix	Dundrod Circuit	(Spain) Angel Nieto		(Australia) Kel Carruthers	(Italy) Giacomo Agostini	(Italy) Giacomo Agostini	(Germany) Enders / Engelhardt	Report
11	7 September	(Italy) Nations Grand Prix	Imola	(Netherlands) Paul Lodewijkx	(United Kingdom) Dave Simmonds	(United Kingdom) Phil Read	(United Kingdom) Phil Read	(Italy) Alberto Pagani		Report
12	14 September	(Socialist Federal Republic of Yugoslavia) Yugoslavian Grand Prix	Opatija Circuit	(Netherlands) Paul Lodewijkx	(West Germany) Dieter Braun	(Australia) Kel Carruthers	(Italy) Silvio Grassetti	(United Kingdom) Godfrey Nash		Report

== Final standings ==
=== Scoring system ===
Points were awarded to the top ten finishers in each race. Only the best of five were counted on 125cc championships, best of six in 50cc, 250cc and 350cc championships and best of seven in the 500cc championship, while in the Sidecars, the best of four races were counted.

Position	1st	2nd	3rd	4th	5th	6th	7th	8th	9th	10th
Points	15	12	10	8	6	5	4	3	2	1

==== 500cc final standings ====
Pos	Rider	Machine	ESP (Spain)	GER (Germany)	FRA (France)	MAN (Isle of Man)	HOL (Netherlands)	BEL (Belgium)	DDR (East Germany)	TCH (Czechoslovakia)	FIN (Finland)	ULS (Northern Ireland)	NAC (Italy)	YUG (Socialist Federal Republic of Yugoslavia)	Pts
1	(Italy) Giacomo Agostini	MV Agusta	1	1	1	1	1	1	1	1	1	1		DNS	**105** (150)
2	(Switzerland) Gyula Marsovszky	Librenti / Linto	4	6	6		6	4		2	Ret		7	Ret	**47**
3	(United Kingdom) Godfrey Nash	Norton	5	9	5		7	Ret		9	3		Ret	1	**45**
4	(United Kingdom) Billie Nelson	Paton		Ret	2		9	Ret	2	7	2		Ret		**42**
5	(United Kingdom) Alan Barnett	Kirby-Metisse				2	3	3				Ret			**32**
6	(United Kingdom) Steve Ellis	Linto	Ret		8		Ret		3		8			3	**26**
7	(United Kingdom) Ron Chandler	Seeley-Matchless		10		6	8	5				6	6		**25**
8	(Italy) Gilberto Milani	Aermacchi		7			4						2	Ret	**24**
9	(United Kingdom) Robin Fitton	Norton		5	Ret		16	6				4			**19**
10	(Northern Ireland) Brian Steenson	Seeley-Matchless				Ret						2	5		**18**
11	(Australia) John Dodds	Linto / Seeley-URS		4			Ret	Ret		Ret	Ret		3	Ret	**18**
12	(Australia) Terry Dennehy	Honda					Ret		5		7		4	Ret	**18**
13	(Australia) Jack Findlay	Linto / Aermacchi / Matchless	Ret	3	Ret	Ret	5	Ret	Ret	DNS	Ret		Ret	Ret	**16**
14	(Italy) Alberto Pagani	Linto		Ret	Ret	Ret	Ret	Ret	Ret	Ret			1		**15**
15	(United Kingdom) Lewis Young	Matchless						12			5		13	4	**14**
16	(Austria) Karl Auer	Matchless			3		10	9	Ret				Ret	Ret	**13**
17	(Finland) Pentti Lehtelä	Matchless							8		6		14	6	**13**
18	(Italy) Angelo Bergamonti	Paton	2	Ret	Ret	Ret		Ret		Ret					**12**
=	(United Kingdom) Percy Tait	Triumph			Ret		Ret	2				Ret	Ret	Ret	**12**
20	(Germany) Karl Hoppe	Metisse-URS / Seeley-URS		2			Ret		Ret		Ret				**12**
21	(Italy) Franco Trabalzini	Paton / Norton							Ret				Ret	2	**12**
22	(United Kingdom) Peter Williams	Matchless					2								**12**
23	(Czechoslovakia) Bohumil Staša	ČZ					12			3		9			**12**
24	(United Kingdom) Tom Dickie	Seeley-Matchless				3	14	10		Ret					**11**
25	(United Kingdom) Dan Shorey	Seeley / Matchless		12	9		13	8		5	Ret		Ret		**11**
26	(United Kingdom) Malcolm Uphill	Norton				Ret						3			**10**
27	(New Zealand) Ginger Molloy	Bultaco	3												**10**
28	(Netherlands) Teo Louwes	Norton			4		Ret	13					9		**10**
29	(Scotland) John-Tom Findlay	Norton				5						7			**10**
30	(Germany) Walter Scheimann	Norton		Ret	10		15	7		6					**10**
31	(Finland) Hannu Kuparinen	Matchless									4		10	Ret	**9**
32	(Austria) Werner Bergold	Matchless							4	10					**9**
33	(Italy) Silvano Bertarelli	Paton / Aermacchi					Ret			4				Ret	**8**
34	(United Kingdom) Derek Woodman	Seeley-Matchless				4									**8**
35	(France) André-Luc Appietto	Paton			7		Ret		Ret	8					**7**
36	(New Zealand) Keith Turner	Linto	Ret		Ret		11		Ret		Ret		Ret	5	**6**
37	(United Kingdom) Barry Scully	Norton										5	Ret		**6**
38	(Australia) Phil O'Brien	Matchless				20			6	11	Ret		11		**5**
39	(Germany) Günter Fischer	Matchless	6							Ret					**5**
40	(United Kingdom) Maurice Hawthorne	Linto / Matchless		Ret				Ret	7		Ret		Ret	10	**5**
41	(Germany) Paul Eickelberg	Norton		Ret				11						7	**4**
42	(United Kingdom) Steve Jolly	Seeley-Matchless				7						11			**4**
43	(Switzerland) Gilbert Argo	Matchless	7												**4**
44	(Australia) Kel Carruthers	Aermacchi	Ret	8	Ret	Ret		Ret							**3**
45	(Italy) Emanuelle Maugliani	Norton							Ret				Ret	8	**3**
46	(United Kingdom) John Williams	Matchless-Metisse / Metisse				Ret						8			**3**
47	(Italy) Paolo Campanelli	Seeley-Matchless											8		**3**
=	(Wales) Selwyn Griffiths	Matchless				8									**3**
49	(Australia) Ross Hannan	Norton				31			11					9	**2**
50	(Sweden) Jack Lindh	Seeley-Matchless							9		Ret				**2**
51	(United Kingdom) Peter Darvill	Norton				9									**2**
=	(Finland) Osmo Hansen	Matchless									9				**2**
53	(Estonian Soviet Socialist Republic) Endel Kiisa	Vostok							10	Ret					**1**
=	(United Kingdom) Steve Spencer	Metisse / Norton				10			Ret						**1**
55	(United Kingdom) Alan Lawton	Norton										10			**1**
=	(Austria) Wolfgang Stropek	MV Agusta									10				**1**
57	(Germany) Heinrich Rosenbusch	Norton / Linto		14										11	**0**
58	(Wales) Brian Adams	Norton				11									**0**
=	(France) Jean-Claude Costeux	Aermacchi			11										**0**
=	(Sweden) Ake Dahli	Kawasaki									11				**0**
=	(Germany) Ferdinand Kaczor	BMW		11											**0**
62	(Sweden) Bo Granath	Husqvarna / Seeley	Ret	Ret	Ret			Ret	12	12	Ret				**0**
63	(Italy) Vittorio Brambilla	Paton											12		**0**
=	(United Kingdom) Vincent Duckett	Matchless				12									**0**
=	(Northern Ireland) Jimmy Johnston	Matchless										12			**0**
=	(France) Patrick Lefevre	Norton			12										**0**
=	(France) René Guilli	Matchless								12					**0**
68	(Scotland) Charlie Dobson	Matchless				Ret						13			**0**
69	(United Kingdom) Malcom Moffatt	Matchless				13									**0**
=	(France) Jean-Pierre Naudon	Matchless			13										**0**
=	(Germany) Armand Nerger	Honda		13											**0**
72	(Germany) Hans-Otto Butenuth	BMW				14	15								**0**
73	(Sweden) Billy Andersson	Crescent / Monark				Ret		14			Ret				**0**
74	(Northern Ireland) Campbell Gorman	Matchless										14			**0**
=	(Sweden) Lasse Johansson	HM								14					**0**
=	(France) Thierry Tchernine	Velocette			14										**0**
77	(United Kingdom) Ken Kay	Norton / Aermacchi				Ret						15			**0**
78	(United Kingdom) Jim Curry	Aermacchi						15							**0**
=	(United Kingdom) Keith Heckles	Norton				15									**0**
80	(United Kingdom) Chris Neve	Matchless				Ret						16			**0**
81	(United Kingdom) Geoff Barry	Matchless				16									**0**
=	(Germany) Rupert Bauer	BMW		16											**0**
=	(Belgium) Serge Jamsin	Norton						16							**0**
84	(Belgium) Guy Cooremans	Norton						17							**0**
=	(Netherlands) Henk Kist	Honda					17								**0**
=	(United Kingdom) Albert Spooner	Norton				17									**0**
=	(Germany) Rolf Thiemig	Norton		17											**0**
=	(Northern Ireland) Harry Turner	Norton										17			**0**
89	(United Kingdom) Brian Moses	Norton				18									**0**
=	(Germany) Willi Bertsch	Honda		18											**0**
91	(Scotland) William Kane	Matchless				19									**0**
92	(United Kingdom) Dave Foulkes	Norton				21									**0**
93	(United Kingdom) Dennis Trollope	Norton				22									**0**
94	(United Kingdom) Brian Edwards	Kettle-Norton				23									**0**
95	(United Kingdom) Jim Ashton	Matchless				24									**0**
96	(New Zealand) Ray Breingan	Norton				25									**0**
97	(United Kingdom) Adrian Cooper	Harrow-Suzuki				26									**0**
98	(Northern Ireland) Robert Reid	Norton				27									**0**
99	(United Kingdom) Harry Reynolds	Matchless				28									**0**
100	(United Kingdom) Derek Filler	Norton				29									**0**
101	(United Kingdom) Ray Knight	Hughes-Triumph				30									**0**
-	(United Kingdom) Paul Smart	Higley-Norton / Seeley				Ret	Ret				Ret				**0**
-	(Rhodesia) Gordon Keith	Velocette / Yamaha				Ret			Ret						**0**
-	(Italy) Giuseppe Mandolini	Moto Guzzi / Paton											Ret	Ret	**0**
-	(Estonian Soviet Socialist Republic) Jüri Randla	Vostok							Ret	Ret					**0**
-	(Northern Ireland) Tommy Robb	Ryan-Norton				Ret						Ret			**0**
-	(United Kingdom) A. Allen	Velocette				Ret									**0**
-	(United Kingdom) Mick Andrew	Kuhn-Seeley				Ret									**0**
-	(United Kingdom) Raymond Ashcroft	Matchless				Ret									**0**
-	(United Kingdom) George Barnacle	Triumph				Ret									**0**
-	(United Kingdom) Ronald Baylie	Triumph				Ret									**0**
-	(Austria) Rudolf Bergsleithner	Matchless								Ret					**0**
-	(United Kingdom) Roy Bisbey	Norton				Ret									**0**
-	(United Kingdom) Bob Biscardine	Norton				Ret									**0**
-	(United Kingdom) John Blanchard	Seeley										Ret			**0**
-	(Scotland) Gerald Borland	JD Special				Ret									**0**
-	(United Kingdom) John Burguess	Norton	Ret												**0**
-	(United Kingdom) Rex Butcher	Oakley-Matchless				Ret									**0**
-	(United Kingdom) Roly Capner	Matchless				Ret									**0**
-	(Sweden) Kurt-Ivan Carlsson	Norton				Ret									**0**
-	(United Kingdom) Doug Cash	Norton				Ret									**0**
-	(Canada) Bert Clark	Matchless				Ret									**0**
-	(United Kingdom) Roger Corbett	Cornett-Norton Domiracer				Ret									**0**
-	(United Kingdom) Paul Cott	Norton				Ret									**0**
-	(United Kingdom) Walter Dawson	Norton				Ret									**0**
-	(Italy) Gianfranco Domeniconi	Norton												Ret	**0**
-	(United Kingdom) Harry Evans	CRD				Ret									**0**
-	(United Kingdom) Bill Fulton	Norton				Ret									**0**
-	(United Kingdom) Ron Fursman	Norton				Ret									**0**
-	(Scotland) Denis Gallagher	Matchless				Ret									**0**
-	(Australia) Tom Gill	Norton				Ret									**0**
-	(United Kingdom) Tony Godfrey	Coleshill-Seeley				Ret									**0**
-	(Scotland) Robert Graham	Matchless				Ret									**0**
-	(United Kingdom) Bob Heath	Norton				Ret									**0**
-	(Germany) Gerhard Heukerott	Norton								Ret					**0**
-	(Germany) Albert Hund	Norton		Ret											**0**
-	(United Kingdom) Tony Jefferies	Triumph				Ret									**0**
-	(United Kingdom) Leslie Kempster	LGK-Norton				Ret									**0**
-	(Hungary) György Kurucz	Norton		Ret											**0**
-	(Germany) Otto Labitzke	BMW		Ret											**0**
-	(Scotland) Cliff Lawson	Norton				Ret									**0**
-	(United Kingdom) Alan Lawton	Norton				Ret									**0**
-	(Austria) Edy Lenz	Matchless						Ret							**0**
-	(Italy) Vasco Loro	Norton												Ret	**0**
-	(United Kingdom) Donald May	Petty-Norton				Ret									**0**
-	(United Kingdom) Steve Murray	Matchless				Ret									**0**
-	(South Africa) Garth Neveling	Norton				Ret									**0**
-	(United Kingdom) Nigel Palmer	Matchless-Metisse				Ret									**0**
-	(United Kingdom) Terry Pallister	Norton				Ret									**0**
-	(Wales) Frank Perris	Suzuki				Ret									**0**
-	(United Kingdom) Norman Price	Norton				Ret									**0**
-	(United Kingdom) Barry Randle	Norton				Ret									**0**
-	(United Kingdom) Tony Rutter	Norton				Ret									**0**
-	(United Kingdom) Charlie Sanby	Wragg-Seeley				Ret									**0**
-	(United Kingdom) Graham Sharp	Norton				Ret									**0**
-	(United Kingdom) Roy Simmons	Triumph				Ret									**0**
-	(United Kingdom) Bill Smith	Arter-Matchless				Ret									**0**
-	(Czech Republic) Frantisek Srna	Jawa								Ret					**0**
-	(Czechoslovakia) František Šťastný	Jawa						Ret							**0**
-	(United Kingdom) Roger Stopford	Norton				Ret									**0**
-	(United Kingdom) Brian Swales	Norton				Ret									**0**
-	(United Kingdom) John Taylor	Matchless				Ret									**0**
-	(Netherlands) Mike van Aken	Bultaco					Ret								**0**
-	(Switzerland) Ernst Walther	Honda Drixton				Ret									**0**
-	(Isle of Man) Fred Walton	Velocette-Metisse				Ret									**0**
-	(United Kingdom) Carl Ward	Norton				Ret									**0**
-	(United States) Lance Weil	Norton				Ret									**0**
-	(Malta) John Wetherall	Norton				Ret									**0**
-	(United Kingdom) Dave Williams	BSA				Ret									**0**
-	(United Kingdom) Tony Wilmott	Norton				Ret									**0**
-	(United Kingdom) Stan Woods	EWS				Ret									**0**
Pos	Rider	Bike	ESP (Spain)	GER (Germany)	FRA (France)	MAN (United Kingdom)	HOL (Netherlands)	BEL (Belgium)	DDR (East Germany)	CZE (Czech Republic)	FIN (Finland)	ULS (Ulster)	NAC (Italy)	YUG (Socialist Federal Republic of Yugoslavia)	Pts

Colour	Result
Gold	Winner
Silver	Second place
Bronze	Third place
Green	Points classification
Blue	Non-points classification
Blue	Non-classified finish (NC)
Purple	Retired, not classified (Ret)
Red	Did not qualify (DNQ)
Red	Did not pre-qualify (DNPQ)
Black	Disqualified (DSQ)
White	Did not start (DNS)
White	Withdrew (WD)
White	Race cancelled (C)
Blank	Did not practice (DNP)
Blank	Did not arrive (DNA)
Blank	Excluded (EX)

**Bold** – Pole
Italics – Fastest Lap

=== 350cc Standings ===
Place	Rider	Number	Country	Machine	Points	Wins
1	(Italy) Giacomo Agostini		Italy	MV Agusta	90	8
2	(Italy) Silvio Grassetti		Italy	Yamaha / Jawa	47	1
3	(Italy) Giuseppe Visenzi		Italy	Yamaha	45	0
4	(East Germany) Heinz Rosner		East Germany	MZ	38	0
5	(United Kingdom) Rodney Gould		United Kingdom	Yamaha	36	0
6	(Australia) Jack Findlay		Australia	Yamaha	34	0
7	(Australia) Kel Carruthers		Australia	Aermacchi	29	0
8	(Czechoslovakia) Bohumil Staša		Czechoslovakia	ČZ	27	0
9	(Czechoslovakia) František Šťastný		Czechoslovakia	Jawa	26	0
10	(United Kingdom) Bill Ivy		United Kingdom	Jawa	24	0
11	(Finland) Martti Pesonen		Finland	Yamaha	16	0
=	(West Germany) Adolf Ohligschläger		West Germany	Yamaha	16	0
13	(United Kingdom) Phil Read		United Kingdom	Yamaha	15	1
14	(United Kingdom) Brian Steenson		United Kingdom	Aermacchi	12	0
=	(Italy) Gilberto Milani		Italy	Aermacchi	12	0
=	(New Zealand) Ginger Molloy		New Zealand	Bultaco	12	0
17	(United Kingdom) Lewis Young		United Kingdom	Aermacchi	11	0
18	(United Kingdom) Cecil Crawford		United Kingdom	Aermacchi	10	0
=	(West Germany) Walter Scheimann		West Germany	Yamaha	10	0
20	(United Kingdom) Tom Dickie		United Kingdom	Seeley	8	0
=	(West Germany) Karl Hoppe		West Germany	Yamaha	8	0
=	(United Kingdom) Tony Rutter		United Kingdom	Yamaha	8	0
=	(Italy) Silvano Bertarelli		Italy	Aermacchi	8	0
24	(United Kingdom) Terry Grotefeld		United Kingdom	Yamaha	6	0
25	(Switzerland) Herbert Denzler		Switzerland	Aermacchi	5	0
=	(United Kingdom) Selwyn Griffiths		United Kingdom	AJS	5	0
=	(United States) Marty Lunde		United States	Yamaha	5	0
=	(United Kingdom) Tommy Robb		United Kingdom	Aermacchi	5	0
=	(Italy) Bruno Spaggiari		Italy	Ducati	5	0
30	(United Kingdom) John Trevor Findlay		United Kingdom	Norton	4	0
=	(United Kingdom) Billy McCosh		United Kingdom	Aermacchi	4	0
=	(United Kingdom) Brian Smith		United Kingdom	Aermacchi	4	0
33	(United Kingdom) Jerry Lancaster		United Kingdom	Aermacchi	3	0
=	(Czechoslovakia) Karel Bojer		Czechoslovakia	ČZ	3	0
=	(United Kingdom) Billy Guthrie		United Kingdom	Yamaha	3	0
=	(United Kingdom) Cliff Carr		United Kingdom	Yamaha	3	0
=	(United Kingdom) Billie Nelson		United Kingdom	Aermacchi	3	0
=	(United Kingdom) Maurice Hawthorne		United Kingdom	Norton	3	0
=	(United Kingdom) Dave Simmonds		United Kingdom	Kawasaki	3	0
=	(United Kingdom) Jim Curry		United Kingdom	Aermacchi	3	0
42	(West Germany) Günter Fischer		West Germany	Aermacchi	2	0
=	(Rhodesia) Gordon Keith		Rhodesia	Yamaha	2	0
=	(United Kingdom) Mike Hatherill		United Kingdom	Aermacchi	2	0
=	(Netherlands) Jan Kostwinder		Netherlands	Yamaha	2	0
=	(United Kingdom) Robin Fitton		United Kingdom	Norton	2	0
=	(Hungary) János Drapál		Hungary	Aermacchi	2	0
48	(United Kingdom) Godfrey Nash		United Kingdom	Norton	1	0
=	(United Kingdom) Roy Graham		United Kingdom	Aermacchi	1	0
=	(Netherlands) Leo Commu		Netherlands	Yamaha	1	0
=	(Switzerland) Ivar Sauter		Switzerland	Aermacchi	1	0
=	(United Kingdom) Dave Degens		United Kingdom	Aermacchi	1	0
=	(Finland) Hannu Kuparinen		Finland	Yamaha	1	0

=== 250cc Standings ===
Place	Rider	Number	Country	Machine	Points	Wins
1	(Australia) Kel Carruthers		Australia	Benelli	89	3
2	(Sweden) Kent Andersson		Sweden	Yamaha	84	2
3	(Spain) Santiago Herrero		Spain	Ossa	83	3
4	(Italy) Renzo Pasolini		Italy	Benelli	45	3
5	(Sweden) Börje Jansson		Sweden	Kawasaki	45	0
6	(United Kingdom) Rodney Gould		United Kingdom	Yamaha	44	0
7	(East Germany) Heinz Rosner		East Germany	MZ	28	0
8	(United Kingdom) Frank Perris		United Kingdom	Suzuki	25	0
9	(West Germany) Lothar John		West Germany	Yamaha	21	0
10	(West Germany) Dieter Braun		West Germany	MZ	20	0
11	(East Germany) Günter Bartusch		East Germany	MZ	18	0
=	(Italy) Silvio Grassetti		Italy	Yamaha	18	0
13	(United Kingdom) Phil Read		United Kingdom	Yamaha	15	1
14	(Hungary) László Szabó		Hungary	MZ	14	0
15	(Italy) Gilberto Parlotti		Italy	Benelli	12	0
=	(United Kingdom) Mick Chatterton		United Kingdom	Yamaha	12	0
17	(Finland) Martti Pesonen		Finland	Yamaha	11	0
=	(Italy) Angelo Bergamonti		Italy	Aermacchi	11	0
19	(West Germany) Klaus Huber		West Germany	Yamaha	10	0
=	(United Kingdom) Ray McCullough		United Kingdom	Yamaha	10	0
21	(France) Jean Auréal		France	Yamaha	9	0
22	(United Kingdom) Billy Guthrie		United Kingdom	Yamaha	8	0
=	(United Kingdom) Chas Mortimer		United Kingdom	Yamaha	8	0
24	(United Kingdom) Ian Richards		United Kingdom	Yamaha	7	0
25	(Italy) Giuseppe Visenzi		Italy	Yamaha	6	0
=	(West Germany) Toni Gruber		West Germany	Yamaha	6	0
=	(United Kingdom) Frank Whiteway		United Kingdom	Suzuki	6	0
=	(Italy) Walter Villa		Italy	Villa	6	0
29	(United Kingdom) Derek Chatterton		United Kingdom	Yamaha	5	0
=	(Australia) Eric Hinton		Australia	Yamaha	5	0
=	(United Kingdom) Dave Simmonds		United Kingdom	Kawasaki	5	0
=	(Czechoslovakia) František Šťastný		Czechoslovakia	Jawa	5	0
33	(West Germany) Reinhard Scholtis		West Germany	Kawasaki	4	0
=	(Italy) Eugenio Lazzarini		Italy	Benelli	4	0
=	(United Kingdom) Stan Woods		United Kingdom	Yamaha	4	0
=	(Australia) Jack Findlay		Australia	Yamaha	4	0
=	(Finland) Pentti Korhonen		Finland	Yamaha	4	0
38	(United Kingdom) Jerry Lancaster		United Kingdom	Yamaha	3	0
=	(West Germany) Siegfried Lohmann		West Germany	Suzuki	3	0
=	(Spain) Carlos Giró-Vila		Spain	Ossa	3	0
=	(Finland) Teuvo Lansivuori		Finland	Yamaha	3	0
=	(United Kingdom) Dick Pipes		United Kingdom	Yamaha	3	0
=	(Austria) Heinz Kriwanek		Austria	Rotax	3	0
=	(France) Christian Ravel		France	Yamaha	3	0
45	(United Kingdom) Billie Nelson		United Kingdom	Yamaha	2	0
=	(United Kingdom) John Ringwood		United Kingdom	Yamaha	2	0
=	(New Zealand) Keith Turner		New Zealand	Aermacchi	2	0
=	(United Kingdom) Tony Rutter		United Kingdom	Yamaha	2	0
=	(Rhodesia) Gordon Keith		Rhodesia	Yamaha	2	0
=	(Switzerland) Gyula Marsovszky		Switzerland	Yamaha	2	0
51	(Finland) Matti Salonen		Finland	Yamaha	1	0
=	(Czechoslovakia) Karel Bojer		Czechoslovakia	ČZ	1	0

=== 125cc Standings ===
Place	Rider	Number	Country	Machine	Points	Wins
1	(United Kingdom) Dave Simmonds		United Kingdom	Kawasaki	90	8
2	(West Germany) Dieter Braun		West Germany	Suzuki	59	1
3	(Netherlands) Cees van Dongen		Netherlands	Suzuki	51	1
4	(Sweden) Kent Andersson		Sweden	Maico / Yamaha	36	0
5	(Austria) Heinz Kriwanek		Austria	Rotax	33	0
6	(New Zealand) Ginger Molloy		New Zealand	Bultaco	29	0
7	(Poland) Ryszard Mankiewicz		Poland	MZ	27	0
8	(Hungary) László Szabó		Hungary	MZ	26	0
9	(East Germany) Friedhelm Kohlar		East Germany	MZ	24	0
10	(Australia) Kel Carruthers		Australia	Aermacchi	20	0
11	(Italy) Walter Villa		Italy	Villa	18	0
12	(Italy) Silvano Bertarelli		Italy	Aermacchi	17	0
13	(East Germany) Thomas Heuschkel		East Germany	MZ	16	0
14	(France) Jean Auréal		France	Yamaha	15	1
15	(West Germany) Lothar John		West Germany	Yamaha	14	0
16	(East Germany) Gunter Bartusch		East Germany	MZ	12	0
17	(Netherlands) Jan Huberts		Netherlands	MZ	11	0
18	(United Kingdom) Barrie Dickinson		United Kingdom	Honda	10	0
=	(Italy) Francesco Villa		Italy	Villa	10	0
20	(United Kingdom) Tommy Robb		United Kingdom	Bultaco	9	0
=	(West Germany) Siegfried Lohmann		West Germany	MZ	9	0
22	(Spain) Enrique Escuder		Spain	Bultaco	8	0
=	(France) Jacques Roca		France	Derbi	8	0
=	(United Kingdom) Steve Murray		United Kingdom	Honda	8	0
25	(Australia) John Dodds		Australia	Aermacchi	7	0
=	(Australia) Barry Smith		Australia	Derbi	7	0
=	(Italy) Giuseppe Mandolini		Italy	Villa	7	0
28	(Switzerland) Bruno Veigel		Switzerland	Honda	6	0
=	(East Germany) Heinz Rosner		East Germany	MZ	6	0
=	(France) Jean-François Chaffin		France	Villa	6	0
=	(United Kingdom) John Kiddie		United Kingdom	Honda	6	0
32	(France) Pierre Viura		France	Maico	5	0
=	(United Kingdom) Carl Ward		United Kingdom	Honda	5	0
=	(United Kingdom) Chas Mortimer		United Kingdom	Villa	5	0
=	(West Germany) Walter Scheimann		West Germany	Villa	5	0
=	(United Kingdom) Jerry Lancaster		United Kingdom	Honda	5	0
37	(France) Daniel Crivello		France	Maico	4	0
=	(United Kingdom) John Shacklady		United Kingdom	Bultaco	4	0
=	(Sweden) Bo Granath		Sweden	MZ	4	0
=	(Sweden) Börje Jansson		Sweden	Maico	4	0
41	(Finland) Pertti Leinonen		Finland	Honda	3	0
=	(United Kingdom) Charles Garner		United Kingdom	Bultaco	3	0
=	(Switzerland) Herbert Denzler		Switzerland	Honda	3	0
44	(Spain) Ramón Galí		Spain	Bultaco	2	0
=	(Switzerland) Jean Campiche		Switzerland	Honda	2	0
=	(Monaco) Jean-Loup Pasquier		Monaco	Bultaco	2	0
=	(Republic of Ireland) Bob Coulter		Ireland	Bultaco	2	0
=	(Finland) Seppo Kangasniemi		Finland	MZ	2	0
49	(United Kingdom) Jim Curry		United Kingdom	Honda	1	0
=	(United Kingdom) Tom Loughridge		United Kingdom	Bultaco	1	0
=	(Netherlands) Lous van Rijswijk, Jr		Netherlands	Yamaha	1	0
=	(East Germany) Hartmut Bischoff		East Germany	MZ	1	0
=	(East Germany) Eberhard Mahler		East Germany	MZ	1	0
=	(Hungary) János Reisz		Hungary	MZ	1	0

=== 50cc Standings ===
Place	Rider	Number	Country	Machine	Points	Wins
1	(Spain) Angel Nieto		Spain	Derbi	76	2
2	(Netherlands) Aalt Toersen		Netherlands	Kreidler	75	3
3	(Australia) Barry Smith		Australia	Derbi	69	2
4	(Netherlands) Jan de Vries		Netherlands	Kreidler	64	0
5	(Netherlands) Paul Lodewijkx		Netherlands	Jamathi	63	3
6	(Italy) Gilberto Parlotti		Italy	Tomos	31	0
7	(Spain) Santiago Herrero		Spain	Derbi	28	0
8	(West Germany) Rudolf Kunz		West Germany	Kreidler	26	0
9	(West Germany) Ludwig Faßbender		West Germany	Kreidler	25	0
10	(Netherlands) Martin Mijwaart		Netherlands	Jamathi	18	0
11	(Netherlands) Cees van Dongen		Netherlands	Kreidler	14	0
12	(Netherlands) Jan Huberts		Netherlands	Kreidler	12	0
13	(Socialist Federal Republic of Yugoslavia) Janco Florjan-Stefe		Yugoslavia	Tomos	11	0
14	(United Kingdom) Frank Whiteway		United Kingdom	Crooks-Suzuki	10	0
15	(Socialist Federal Republic of Yugoslavia) Adrijan Bernetic		Yugoslavia	Tomos	9	0
16	(West Germany) Werner Reinhard		West Germany	Reimo	8	0
=	(United Kingdom) Stuart Aspin		United Kingdom	Garelli	8	0
18	(Switzerland) Herbert Denzler		Switzerland	Kreidler	7	0
19	(Italy) Giovanni Lombardi		Italy	Guazzoni	6	0
=	(United Kingdom) Luke Lawlor		United Kingdom	Derbi	6	0
21	(Austria) Jakob Unterladstätter		Austria	KTM	5	0
=	(Netherlands) Jos Schurgers		Netherlands	Kreidler	5	0
=	(United Kingdom) Frank Redfern		United Kingdom	Honda	5	0
=	(Italy) Silvano Bertarelli		Italy	Minarelli	5	0
=	(Italy) Franco Ringhini		Italy	Morbidelli	5	0
27	(France) Jacques Roca		France	Derbi	4	0
=	(United Kingdom) Arthur Lawn		United Kingdom	Honda	4	0
=	(Monaco) Jean-Loup Pasquier		Monaco	Derbi	4	0
=	(United Kingdom) Chris Walpole		United Kingdom	Garelli	3	0
=	(Italy) Luigi Rinaldo		Italy	Tomos	3	0
31	(Switzerland) Bruno Veigel		Switzerland	Honda	2	0
=	(West Germany) Rudolf Schmälzle		West Germany	Kreidler	2	0
=	(France) André Millard		France	Kreidler	2	0
=	(United Kingdom) John Lawley		United Kingdom	Honda	2	0
=	(Socialist Federal Republic of Yugoslavia) Anton Kralj		Yugoslavia	Tomos	2	0
36	(Spain) Juan Bordons		Spain	Derbi	1	0
=	(West Germany) Gerhard Thurow		West Germany	Kreidler	1	0
=	(France) Charly Dubois		France	Kreidler	1	0
=	(United Kingdom) Barrie Dickinson		United Kingdom	Garelli	1	0
