= Renzo Pasolini =

Italian motorcycle racer

- Renzo Pasolini in 1970
- Nationality: Italian
- Born: 18 July 1938; Rimini, Italy
- Died: 20 May 1973 (aged 34); Autodromo Nazionale Monza, Italy
Motorcycle racing career statistics
Grand Prix motorcycle racing
Active years	1964–1973
First race	1964 350cc Nations Grand Prix
Last race	1973 250cc Nations Grand Prix
First win	1969 250cc Dutch TT
Last win	1972 250cc Spanish Grand Prix
Team(s)	Aermacchi, Benelli
Championships	0
Starts / Wins / Podiums / Poles / F. laps / Points; 46 / 6 / 35 / N/A / N/A

Renzo Pasolini (18 July 1938 – 20 May 1973), nicknamed "Paso", was an Italian professional motorcycle road racer. He competed in the FIM Grand Prix motorcycle racing world championships from 1964 to 1972.

Although he never won a world championship, Pasolini was a popular competitor due to his fearless and passionate riding style. He was notable for racing with an open-face helmet and black horn-rimmed glasses at a time when most competitors had adopted full-face helmets. Pasolini won five Grand Prix races during his career and narrowly lost the 1972 250cc world championship to Jarno Saarinen by a single point. He died along with Saarinen in an accident at the start of the 1973 Nations Grand Prix at Autodromo Nazionale di Monza.

In 1985, Ducati presented at EICMA the Ducati Paso 750, named after Pasolini.

== Career ==
Pasolini was born in Rimini, in the heart of Romagna, the area of Italy with the strongest motorcycle sports tradition. His father was a motorcyclist and introduced him to both motocross and road racing at a very young age. He began his motocross career in 1958, after having shown great interest in boxing and football as well. A smoker and incorrigible party-goer, he was an uncommon athlete, as was his approach to corners while racing—a dangerous combination of balance and speed which always made him seem about to fall off his bike.

Pasolini was well into his twenties when he made the decision to switch from motocross to road racing. In 1962, he debuted with the Aermacchi 175cc, when his two first-place finishes ahead of Giacomo Agostini spurred their long rivalry. Pasolini took a two-year break from racing to complete his military service and, while stationed in Sardinia, he met his future wife, Anna, with whom he had two children, Sabrina and Renzo Stefano.

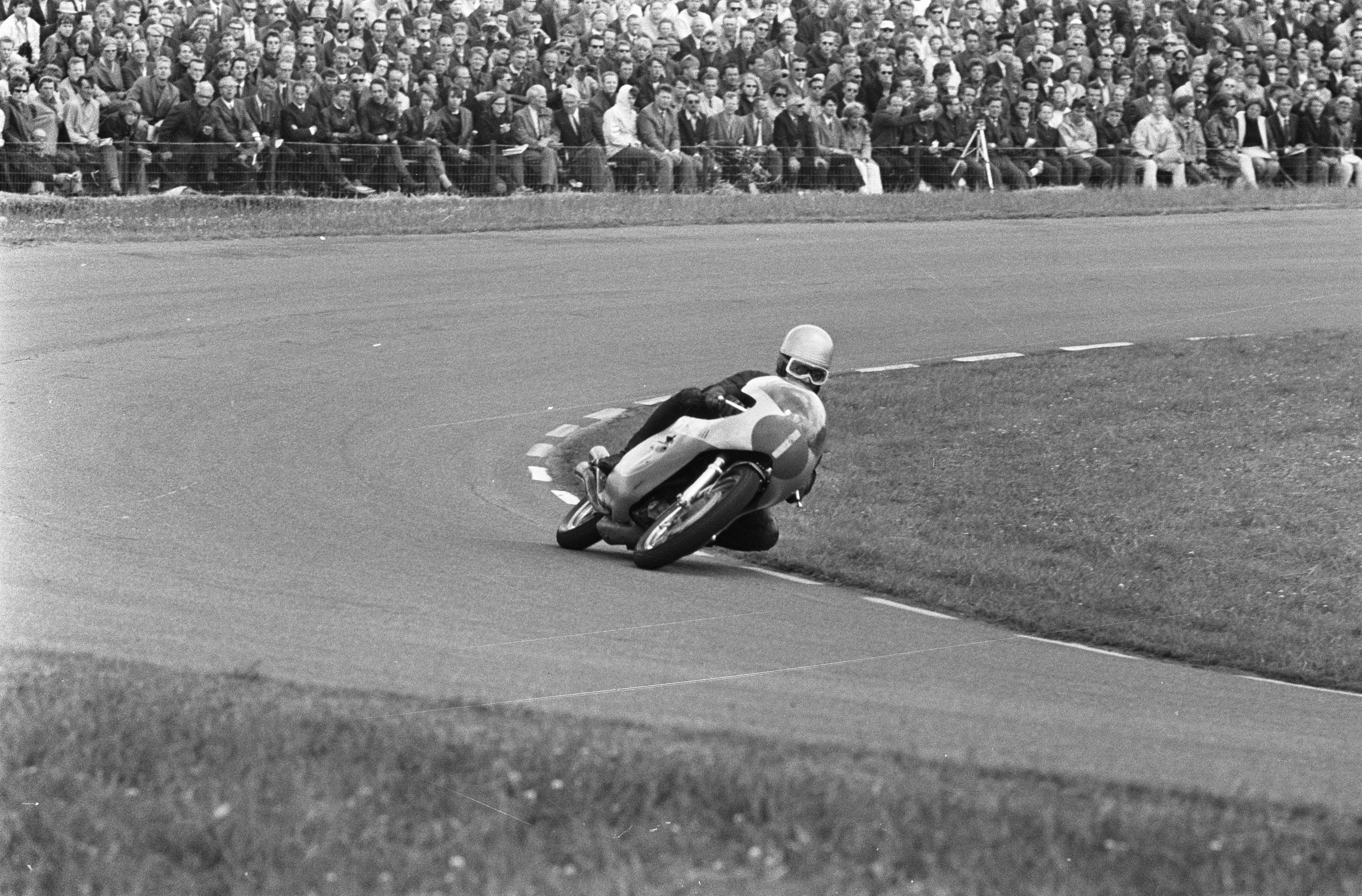
Pasolini riding a Benelli to victory at the 1969 250cc Dutch TT.

Pasolini resumed his racing career in 1964, racing Aermacchi 250cc and 350cc bikes at the senior level. In the 1965 Italian championship, Pasolini, racing a Benelli, finished second to Tarquinio Provini in the 250cc class and third in the 350cc class behind Giacomo Agostini and Giuseppe Mandorlini. 1966 was a year of varying results both domestically and internationally; most notable was the final race of the Italian championship, which Pasolini won on the then-new four-cylinder Benelli 500.

With a more competitive bike, Pasolini was able to rival the best, and this marked the start of a string of epic confrontations with Mike Hailwood, then riding a Honda, and the revival of his rivalry with Agostini, an MV Agusta rider. The 1968 season saw him second to Agostini in the 350cc championship, after having earned the 250cc and 350cc Italian titles.

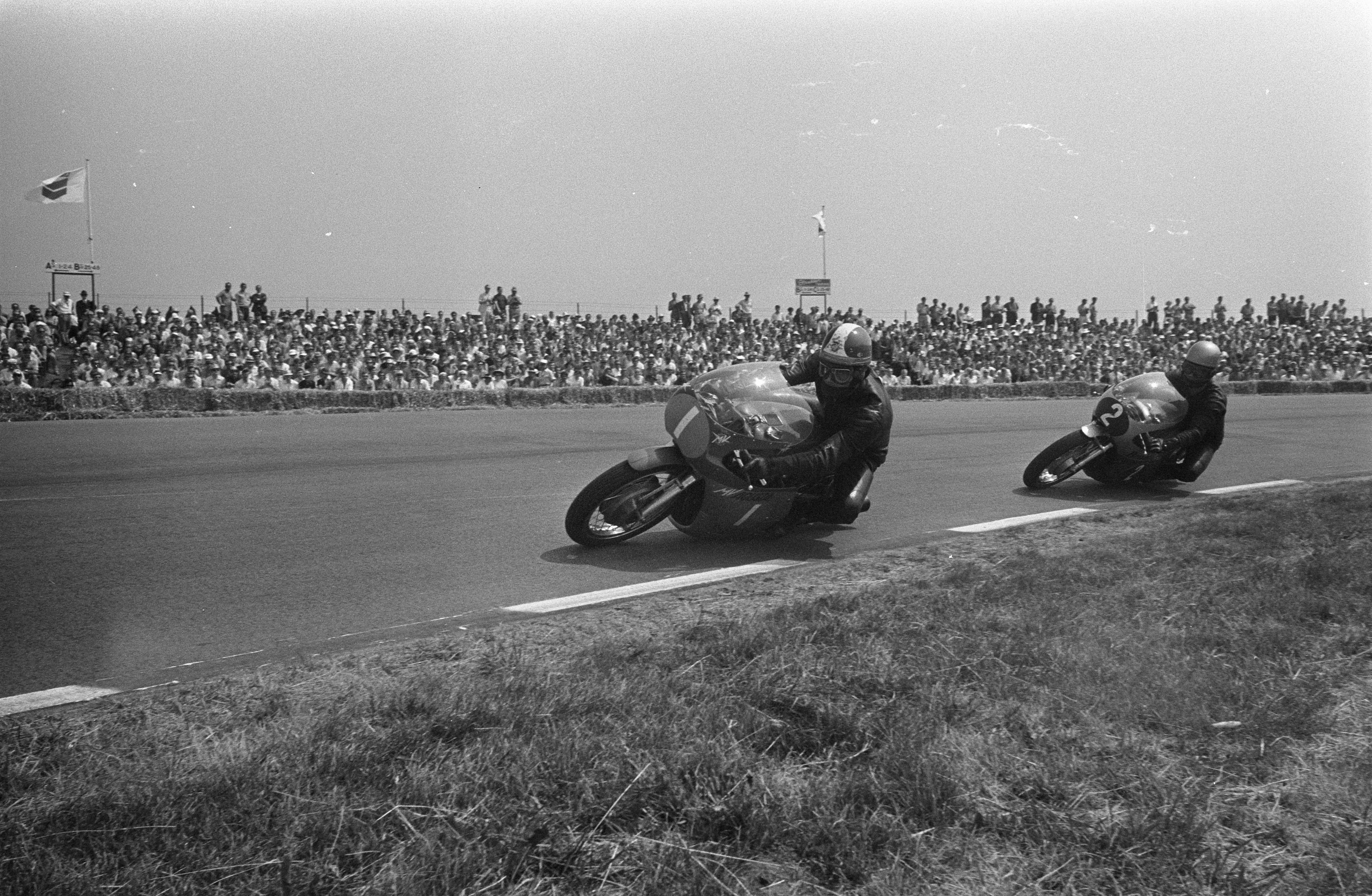
Pasolini (2) pursues Giacomo Agostini (1) during the 1970 350cc Dutch TT.

1969 brought mixed results, causing Pasolini to lose out to Benelli teammate Kel Carruthers in the 250cc world championship. New regulations in the 250cc classification for the 1970 Grand Prix motorcycle racing season limited the category to two-cylinder bikes, which prompted the Benelli team to concentrate on the 350cc class.

After a bad season, Pasolini left Benelli and joined Aermacchi, fresh out of a merger with Harley-Davidson. Much of the 1971 season was lost to testing the Aermacchi/Harley-Davidson 250cc bike, which took much longer in development than had been anticipated. The resulting bike was not superior to most, and a number of up-and-coming racers increased competition; among them was Jarno Saarinen, to whom Pasolini lost the 250cc world championship in 1972 by a single point.

=== Death ===
Pasolini lost his life at the Italian Grand Prix in Monza on 20 May 1973. He was not able to finish the 350cc race because of mechanical problems, retiring from the race with four laps remaining, and fell during the first lap of the 250cc race. Jarno Saarinen, immediately behind him, was unable to avoid him and fell as well, causing a chain reaction ultimately involving twelve riders and resulting in Pasolini's and Saarinen's deaths.

Much debate has surrounded the probable causes of the accident, with the most common explanation suggesting that a spill left on the track during the 350cc race (when Walter Villa's Benelli leaked on the penultimate lap, but the urge to collect championship points led the rider to continue racing despite the leak) likely caused the bike to slide. While it has been ascertained that race officials did neglect to order clean up of the track prior to the 250cc race—one rider, John Dodds, made his concerns known to authorities, only to be met with threats—Pasolini's fall and the damage sustained by his vehicle are consistent with an engine problem, likely a seizure of the pistons.

Pasolini was buried in the Monumental Cemetery of Rimini. His motorbike helmet and some testimonies of his victories are sited at his tomb.

== The Ducati Paso ==
In 1986, Ducati Motor Holding, then under the ownership of Cagiva, introduced the Ducati Paso, named after Pasolini and designed by Massimo Tamburini, co-founder of Bimota.

== Motorcycle Grand Prix results ==
Points system from 1964 to 1968:

**Position**	1	2	3	4	5	6
**Points**	8	6	4	3	2	1

Points from 1969 onwards:

**Position**	1	2	3	4	5	6	7	8	9	10
**Points**	15	12	10	8	6	5	4	3	2	1

(Races in bold indicate pole position; races in italics indicate fastest lap.)

(key)

Year	Class	Team	1	2	3	4	5	6	7	8	9	10	11	12	13	Points	Rank	Wins
1964	350cc	Aermacchi	IOM -	NED -	GER -	DDR -	ULS -	FIN -	NAT; 4	JPN -						3	13th	0
1965	250cc	Aermacchi	USA -	GER -	ESP -	FRA -	IOM; NC	NED -	BEL -	DDR -	CZE -	ULS -	FIN -	NAT -	JPN -	0	–	0
1965	350cc	Aermacchi		GER; 4			IOM; NC	NED; 4		DDR -	CZE; 5	ULS -	FIN -	NAT; 6	JPN -	9	8th	0
1966	250cc	Aermacchi	ESP; 3	GER -	FRA -	NED -	BEL -	DDR -	CZE -	FIN -	ULS -	IOM -	NAT -	JPN -		4	14th	0
1966	350cc	Aermacchi		GER; DNS	FRA; 5	NED; 3	BEL; 4		CZE; 5	FIN -	ULS -	IOM -	NAT; 2	JPN -		17	3rd	0
1967	350cc	Aermacchi	GER; 3	IOM; NC	NED; 3	DDR -	CZE -	ULS -	NAT -	JPN -						8	8th	0
1967	500cc	Benelli	GER -	IOM; NC	NED -	BEL -	DDR -	CZE -	FIN -	ULS -	NAT -	CAN -				0	–	0
1968	250cc	Benelli	GER -	ESP -	IOM; 2	NED; 3	BEL -	DDR -	CZE -	FIN -	ULS -	NAT -				10	6th	0
1968	350cc	Benelli	GER; 2		IOM; 2	NED -		DDR -	CZE -		ULS -	NAT; 2				18	2nd	0
1968	500cc	Benelli	GER -	ESP -	IOM -	NED -	BEL -	DDR -	CZE -	FIN -	ULS -	NAT; 2				6	12th	0
1969	250cc	Benelli	ESP; DNF	GER -	FRA -	IOM -	NED; 1	BEL -	DDR; 1	CZE; 1	FIN -	ULS -	NAT -	YUG -		45	4th	3
1970	350cc	Benelli	GER -	YUG -	IOM; NC	NED; 2	DDR; 2	CZE; 2	FIN -	ULS -	NAT; 3	ESP -				46	3rd	0
1971	250cc	Aermacchi	AUT -	GER -	IOM -	NED -	BEL -	DDR -	CZE -	SWE -	FIN -	ULS -	NAT -	ESP; 5		6	28th	0
1972	250cc	Aermacchi	GER -	FRA; 2	AUT -	NAT; 1	IOM -	YUG; 1	NED; 2	BEL -	DDR; 2	CZE; 2	SWE; 3	FIN -	ESP; 1	93	2nd	3
1972	350cc	Aermacchi	GER; 5	FRA; 3	AUT; 3	NAT; 2	IOM -	YUG -	NED; 3		DDR; 2	CZE; 2	SWE; 4	FIN; 3	ESP; 2	78	3rd	0
1973	250cc	Aermacchi	FRA; 3	AUT -	GER -	IOM -	NAT; DNF	–	–	–	–	–	–	–	–	10	19th	0
