= Giuseppe Visenzi =

Italian motorcycle racer (born 1941)

- Nationality: Italian
- Born: 22 January 1941 (age 85); Brescia, Italy
Motorcycle racing career statistics
Grand Prix motorcycle racing
Active years	1962 - 1966, 1968 - 1970
First race	1962 125cc Belgian Grand Prix
Last race	1970 350cc Italian Grand Prix
Starts / Wins / Podiums / Poles / F. laps / Points; 28 / 0 / 2 / 0 / 0 / 77

Giuseppe Visenzi (born 22 January 1941 in Brescia) is an Italian former Grand Prix motorcycle road racer. His best year was in 1969 when he finished third in the 350cc world championship, behind Giacomo Agostini and Silvio Grassetti.

== Givi ==
The motorcycle accessories company founded by Visenzi in 1978.
