= 1968 Isle of Man TT =

Annual motorcycle racing event

The 1968 Isle of Man TT, the third round of the 1968 Grand Prix motorcycle racing season, involved six championship races on the Mountain Course on the Isle of Man during 8–14 June 1968. Giacomo Agostini won both the Junior and Senior races, completing the six laps of the latter race in 2 hours, 13 minutes and 39.4 seconds to win by almost nine minutes The Ultra-Lightweight 50cc race was won by Barry Smith, the Lightweight 125cc race by Phil Read and the Lightweight 250cc by Bill Ivy.

== FIM Championship races ==
=== Ultra-Lightweight TT 50cc final standings ===
10 June 1968 – 3 Laps (113.00 Miles) Mountain Course.

Place	Rider	Number	Machine	Speed	Time	Points
1	(Australia) Barry Smith	1	Derbi	72.90 mph	1:33.10.4	8
2	(United Kingdom) Chris M. Walpole	9	Honda	67.26 mph	1:40.59.6	6
3	(United Kingdom) Les Griffiths	14	Honda	66.12 mph	1:42.36.0	4
4	(United Kingdom) David Lock	12	Honda	65.66 mph	1:43.27.8	3
5	(United Kingdom) Jim Pink	29	Honda	64.14 mph	1:45.54.2	2
6	(United Kingdom) R.M. Udall	7	Honda	67.70 mph	1:40.03.8	1
DNF	(Spain) Angel Nieto	9	Derbi			

=== Lightweight TT 125cc final standings ===
14 June 1968 – 3 Laps (113.00 Miles) Mountain Course.

Place	Rider	Number	Machine	Speed	Time	Points
1	(United Kingdom) Phil Read	2	Yamaha	99.12 mph	1:08.31.4	8
2	(United Kingdom) Bill Ivy	9	Yamaha	97.78 mph	1:09.27.8	6
3	(Australia) Kel Carruthers	12	Suzuki	86.69 mph	1:18.21.2	4
4	(United Kingdom) Tommy Robb	11	Bultaco	85.80 mph	1:19.10.4	3
5	(Rhodesia) Gordon Keith	7	Brown Special	84.88 mph	1:20.06.4	2
6	(United Kingdom) Steve Murray	16	Honda	83.19 mph	1:21.09.4	1

=== Lightweight TT 250cc final standings ===
10 June 1968 – 6 Laps (226.38 Miles) Mountain Course.

Place	Rider	Number	Machine	Speed	Time	Points
1	(United Kingdom) Bill Ivy	21	Yamaha	99.58 mph	2:16.24.8	8
2	(Italy) Renzo Pasolini	5	Benelli	98.00 mph	2:18.36.8	6
3	(East Germany) Heinz Rosner	12	MZ	95.04 mph	2:22.56.4	4
4	(United Kingdom) Malcolm Uphill	1	Suzuki	93.86 mph	2:24.44.4	3
5	(United Kingdom) Rod Gould	32	Yamaha	93.61 mph	2:25.07.0	2
6	(United Kingdom) Bill Smith	3	Yamaha	92.26 mph	2:27.14.8	1

=== Junior TT 350cc final standings ===
12 June 1968 – 6 Laps (236.38 Miles) Mountain Course.

Place	Rider	Number	Machine	Speed	Time	Points
1	(Italy) Giacomo Agostini	6	MV Agusta	104.78 mph	2:09.38.6	8
2	(Italy) Renzo Pasolini	17	Benelli	102.65 mph	2:12.19.6	6
3	(United Kingdom) Bill Smith	7	Honda	95.02 mph	2:22.58.6	4
4	(United Kingdom) Derek Woodman	15	Aermacchi	93.46 mph	2:25.21.4	3
5	(United Kingdom) John Cooper	16	Seeley	93.35 mph	2:25.32.0	2
6	(Australia) Jack Findlay	1	Aermacchi	93.04 mph	2:26.00.0	1

=== Sidecar TT 500cc final standings ===
8 June 1968 – 3 Laps (113.2 Miles) Mountain Course.

Place	Rider	Number	Machine	Speed	Time	Points
1	(West Germany) Siegfried Schauzu/H. Schneider	7	BMW	91.09 mph	1:14.34.2	8
2	(West Germany) Johann Attenburger/J. Schillinger	2	BMW	89.47 mph	1:15.55.2	6
3	(West Germany) Hans Luthringhauser/G. Hughes	5	BMW	87.60 mph	1:17.32.6	4
4	(West Germany) Helmut Fath/W. Kalauch	4	BMW	87.28 mph	1:17.49.0	3
5	(United Kingdom) John Brandon/C. Holland	23	BMW	82.43 mph	1:22.24.4	2
6	(United Kingdom) Maurice Tombs/T. Tombs	14	BMW	82.20 mph	1:22.30.8	1

=== Senior TT 500cc final standings ===
14 June 1968 – 6 Laps (236.38 Miles) Mountain Course.

Place	Rider	Number	Machine	Speed	Time	Points
1	(Italy) Giacomo Agostini	7	MV Agusta	103.63 mph	2:13.39.4	8
2	(United Kingdom) Brian Ball	30	Seeley-Matchless	95.97 mph	2:22.08.4	6
3	(United Kingdom) Barry Randle	39	Petty Norton	95.57 mph	2:22.26.8	4
4	(United Kingdom) Bill Smith	14	Matchless	95.02 mph	2:22.58.0	3
5	(United Kingdom) Bernie Lund		Matchless	94.96 mph	2:22.34.2	2
6	(Australia) Kel Carruthers	3	Norton	94.23 mph	2:23.06.4	1

== Non-championship races ==
=== Sidecar 750cc TT final standings ===
8 June 1968 – 3 Laps (113.00 Miles) Mountain Course.

Rank	Rider	Team	Speed	Time
1	(United Kingdom) Terry Vinicombe/J. Flaxman	BSA	85.85 mph	1.19.07.4
2	(United Kingdom) Norman Hanks/Rose Arnold	BSA	83.71 mph	1.21.44.0
3	(United Kingdom) Peter Brown/D. Bean	BSA	83.03 mph	1.21.48.0
4	(United Kingdom) Mick Horsepole/G. Horspole	Triumph	79.53 mph	1.25.24.0
5	(United Kingdom) John B. Crick/D. Senior	Triumph	78.96 mph	1.21.01.2
6	(United Kingdom) Ken Graham/G. Sewell	Triumph	78.45 mph	1.26.35.4
7	(United Kingdom) Ernie H. Leece/John Molyneux	LMS	78.35 mph	1.26.41.6
8	(United Kingdom) Derek Plummer/Malcolm Brett	Triumph	76.98 mph	1.28.13.8
9	(United Kingdom) Terry Windle/R. Hinchcliffe	Triumph	76.49 mph	1.28.48.8
10	(United Kingdom) Dave Saville/E. Fletcher	Sabre	76.26 mph	1.29.04.0

=== Production TT 750 cc final standings ===
12 June 1968 – 3 Laps (113.00 Miles) Mountain Course.

Rank	Rider	Team	Speed	Time
1	(United Kingdom) Ray Pickrell	Dunstall Norton 750 Dominator	98.13 mph	1.09.13.2
2	(United Kingdom) Billie Nelson	Norton	94.62 mph	1.11.47.2
3	(United Kingdom) Tony Smith	BSA	93.82 mph	1.12.23.8
4	(United Kingdom) Graham Bailey	Triumph	89.66 mph	1.13.12.6
5	(United Kingdom) Malcolm Uphill	Triumph	80.08 mph	1.17.07.0
6	(United Kingdom) Tony Godfrey	Dunstall Norton 750 Dominator	85.92 mph	1.19.03.2

=== Production TT 500 cc final standings ===
12 June 1968 – 3 Laps (113.00 Miles) Mountain Course.

Rank	Rider	Team	Speed	Time
1	(United Kingdom) Ray Knight	Triumph	90.09 mph	1.15.23.6
2	(United Kingdom) John Blanchard	Velocette	88.58 mph	1.16.41.2
3	(United Kingdom) David Nixon	Triumph	88.52 mph	1.16.44.4
4	(United Kingdom) Neil Kelly	Velocette	86.47 mph	1.18.33.0
5	(United Kingdom) Graham Robinson	Honda	85.54 mph	1.19.24.2
6	(United Kingdom) George Barnacle	Triumph	84.23 mph	1.20.36.8
7	(United Kingdom) Hugh Evans	BSA	84.47 mph	1.23.08.6
8	(United Kingdom) Chas Mortimer	Ducati	77.96 mph	1.27.07.6
9	(United Kingdom) T. Walker	Triumph	75.26 mph	1.30.15.0

=== Production TT 250 cc final standings ===
12 June 1968 – 3 Laps (113.00 Miles) Mountain Course.

Rank	Rider	Team	Speed	Time
1	(United Kingdom) Tervor Burgess	Ossa	87.21 mph	1.17.53.4
2	(United Kingdom) George E. Leigh	Bultaco	85.23 mph	1.19.41.8
3	(United Kingdom) Barry Smith	Suzuki	85.17 mph	1.19.45.0
4	(United Kingdom) Brian Richards	Bultaco	83.61 mph	1.21.14.0
5	(Rhodesia) Gordon Keith	Suzuki	83.26 mph	1.21.35.2
6	(United Kingdom) Tommy Robb	Suzuki	83.03 mph	1.21.48.0
7	(Australia) Kel Carruthers	Suzuki	82.10 mph	1.23.43.8
8	(United Kingdom) Mike Rogers	Ducati	80.31 mph	1.24.38.8
9	(United Kingdom) Adrian T Cooper	Suzuki	79.40 mph	1.25.32.6
10	(United Kingdom) Ernie Johnson	Suzuki	79.38 mph	1.25.33.6
