= Godfrey Nash =

- Nationality: (United Kingdom) British
Motorcycle racing career statistics
Grand Prix motorcycle racing
Active years	1968 – 1971
First race	1968 500cc East German Grand Prix
Last race	1971 350cc Dutch TT
First win	1969 500cc Yugoslavian Grand Prix
Last win	1969 500cc Yugoslavian Grand Prix
Championships	0
Starts / Wins / Podiums / Poles / F. laps / Points; 12 / 1 / 2 / 1 / 1 / 55

Godfrey Nash was a former Grand Prix motorcycle road racer. He competed from 1968 to 1971 in the Grand Prix world championships. His best season was in 1969 when he won the 500cc Yugoslavian Grand Prix, and finished the season in third place behind Giacomo Agostini and Gyula Marsovsky. With his victory on a Norton Manx at the 1969 Yugoslavian Grand Prix at the Opatija Circuit, he became the last rider to win a 500cc Grand Prix race on a single-cylinder machine.
