= Brian Ball =

British motorcycle racer

- Nationality: British
Motorcycle racing career statistics
Grand Prix motorcycle racing
| Active years | 1968 |
| First race | 1968 Isle of Man 500cc Senior TT |
| Last race | 1968 Isle of Man 500cc Senior TT |
| Championships | 0 |
Starts / Wins / Podiums / Poles / F. laps / Points; 2 / 0 / 1 / 0 / 0 / 6

Brian Ball was a former Grand Prix motorcycle road racer. He competed in only one Grand Prix race during the 1968 Grand Prix motorcycle racing season, finishing the year in 12th place in the 500cc world championship. At the 1968 Isle of Man TT, he finished second to Giacomo Agostini in the Senior TT.
