= Alan Barnett (motorcyclist) =

British motorcycle racer

- Nationality: British
Motorcycle racing career statistics
Grand Prix motorcycle racing
Active years	1969 – 1971
First race	1969 Isle of Man 500cc Senior TT
Last race	1971 Isle of Man 250cc Lightweight TT
Championships	0
Starts / Wins / Podiums / Poles / F. laps / Points; 10 / 0 / 6 / N/A / N/A / 86

Alan Barnett was a former Grand Prix motorcycle road racer. He competed from 1969 to 1971 in the Grand Prix world championships. His best season was in 1969 when he finished the season in fifth place in the 500cc world championship.
