= Paul Lodewijkx =

Dutch motorcycle racer

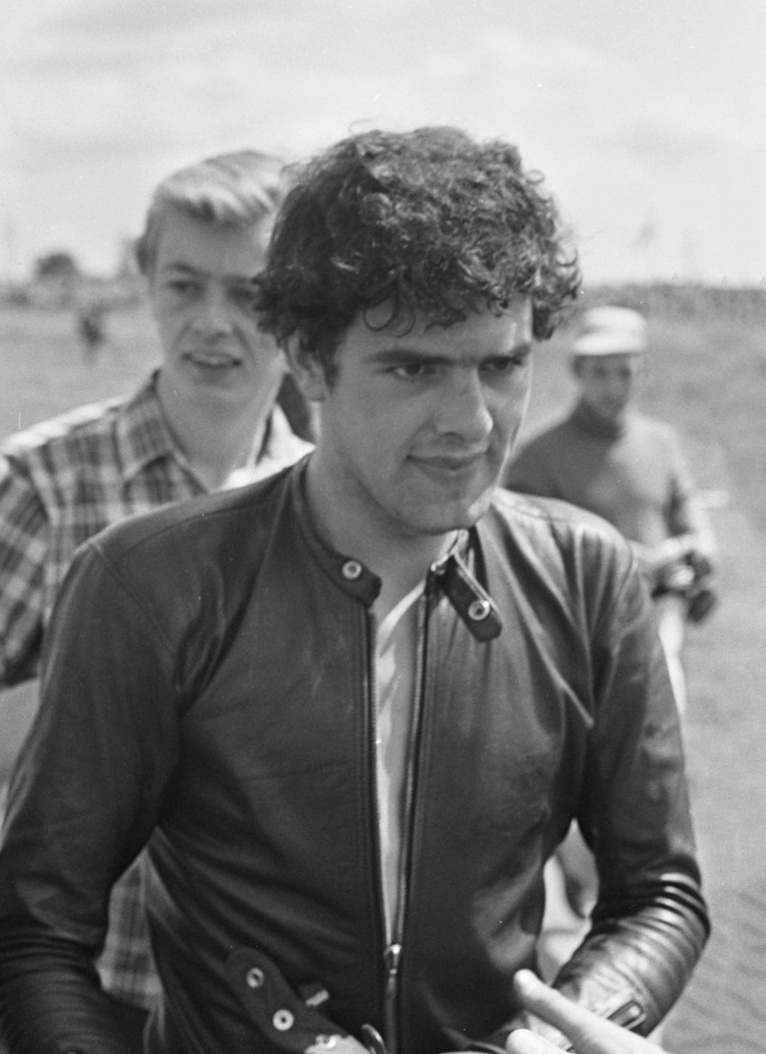
- Paul Lodewijkx in 1968
- Nationality: Dutch
Motorcycle racing career statistics
Grand Prix motorcycle racing
Active years	1967 – 1969
First race	1967 50cc Dutch TT
Last race	1969 50cc Yugoslavian Grand Prix
First win	1968 50cc Dutch TT
Last win	1969 50cc Yugoslavian Grand Prix
Team	Jamathi
Championships	0
Starts / Wins / Podiums / Poles / F. laps / Points; 10 / 4 / 6 / N/A / 2 / 82

Paul Lodewijkx (9 January 1947 – 10 August 1988) was a Dutch professional Grand Prix motorcycle road racer. He had his best year in 1968 when he won the Dutch TT on a hometown Jamathi bike, built by his friends, and finished the season in second place behind Hans-Georg Anscheidt (riding for the Suzuki team). He was the first Dutchman to win his home Grand Prix.

In 1969, Lodewijkx had a traffic accident on his motorbike. After a long recovery, he was left with occasional epileptic seizures and his return in 1972 was unsuccessful. His new hobby became nature preservation and photography. An epileptic seizure caused his death by drowning in 1988.

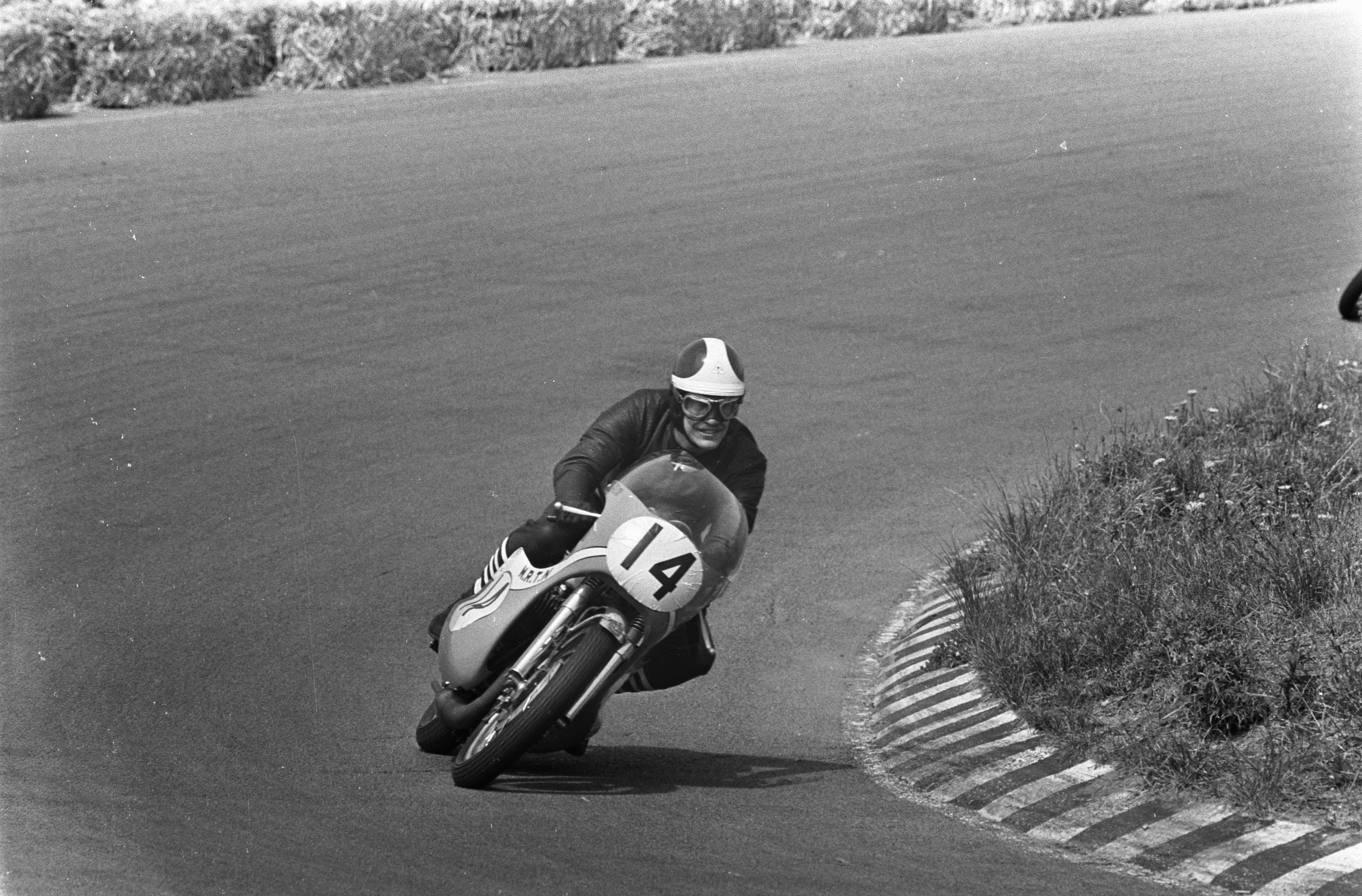
Lodewijkx competing at the Zandvoort Circuit in the 250cc class.
