= Martti Pesonen =

Finnish motorcycle racer

- Nationality: Finnish
Motorcycle racing career statistics
Grand Prix motorcycle racing
Active years	1969 - 1971
First race	1969 250cc Spanish Grand Prix
Last race	1971 350cc Dutch TT
Starts / Wins / Podiums / Poles / F. laps / Points; 19 / 0 / 0 / 0 / 0 / 94

Martti Pesonen is a Finnish former professional motorcycle road racer. He competed in Grand Prix motorcycle racing from 1969 to 1971.

Pesonen had his most successful year in 1970 when he finished in fifth place in the 350cc World Championship. He was a childhood friend of motocross world champion, Heikki Mikkola.
