= Lothar John =

German motorcycle racer (1933–2025)

- Nationality: German
Motorcycle racing career statistics
Grand Prix motorcycle racing
Active years	1966, 1968–1973
First race	1968 125cc Czechoslovak Grand Prix
Last race	1973 500cc Czechoslovak Grand Prix
Starts / Wins / Podiums / Poles / F. laps / Points; 31 / 0 / 1 / 0 / 0 / 88

Lothar John (17 September 1933 – 14 March 2025) was a German Grand Prix motorcycle road racer. His best year was in 1969, when he finished ninth in the 250cc world championship. John died on 14 March 2025, at the age of 91.
