= Gilberto Milani =

Italian motorcycle racer (1932–2021)

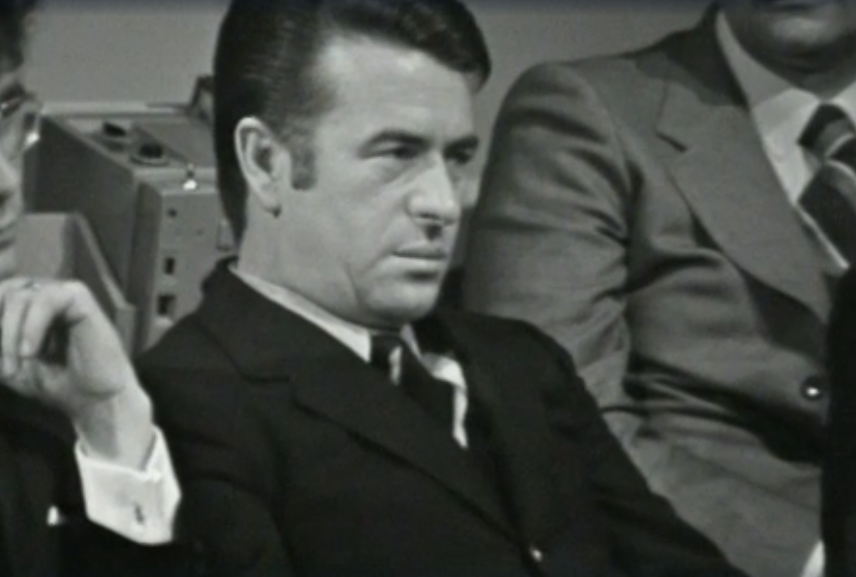
- Gilberto Milani (1972)
- Nationality: Italian
- Born: 13 May 1932; Milan, Italy
- Died: 30 October 2021 (aged 89); Varese, Italy
Motorcycle racing career statistics
Grand Prix motorcycle racing
Active years	1960, 1962 - 1969
First race	1960 250cc Nations Grand Prix
Last race	1969 350cc Yugoslavian Grand Prix
Team	Aermacchi
Starts / Wins / Podiums / Poles / F. laps / Points; 23 / 0 / 3 / N/A / N/A / 73

Gilberto Milani (13 May 1932 – 30 October 2021) was an Italian Grand Prix motorcycle road racer. His best year was in 1969 when he finished ninth in the 500cc world championship. After his riding career had ended, Milani took on the role of racing team manager for the Aermacchi factory, which was then bought by Harley Davidson. Milani played a role in managing Walter Villa to three consecutive 250cc road racing world championships.
