= Barry Smith (motorcyclist) =

Australian motorcycle racer

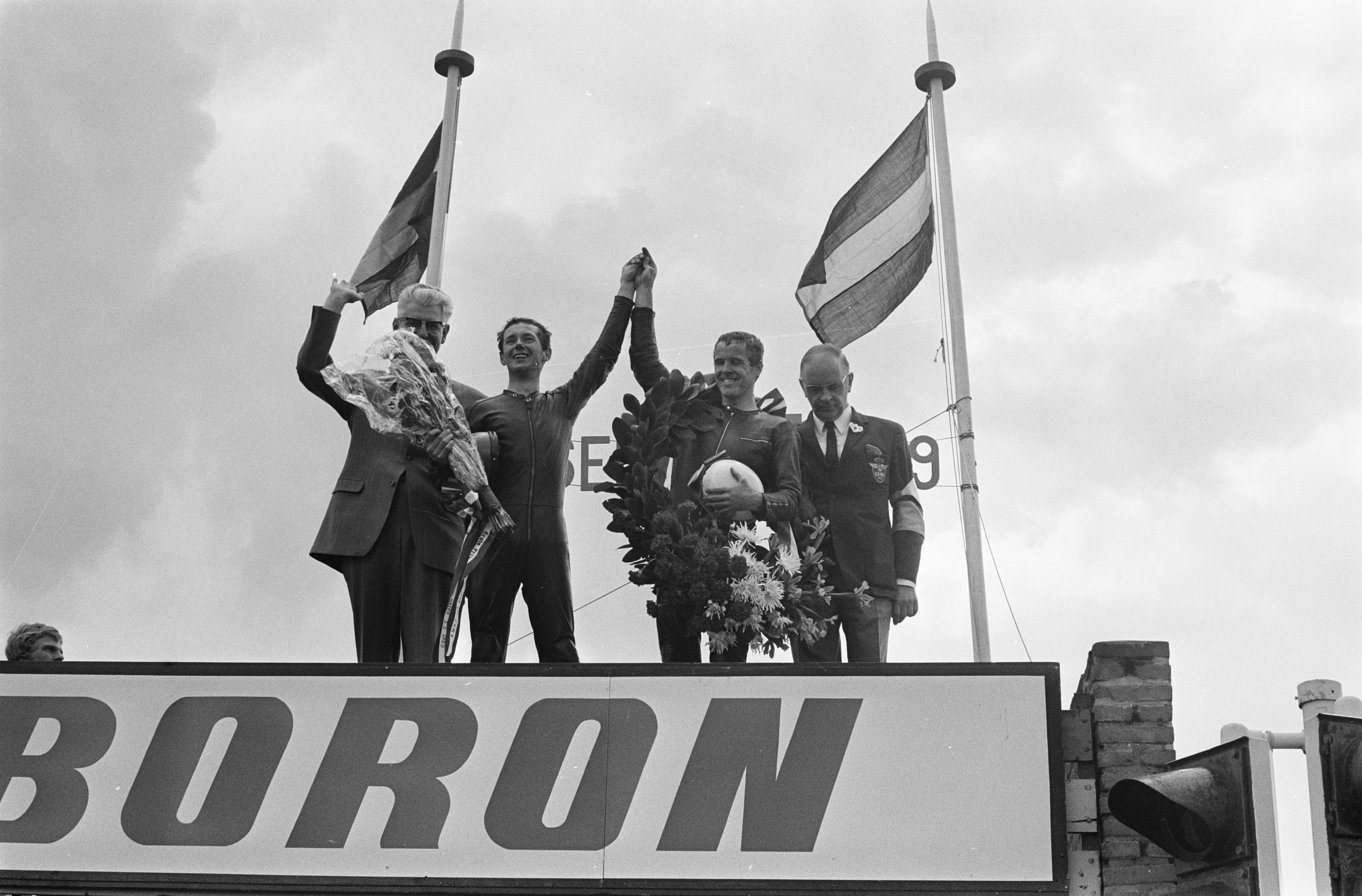
- Barry Smith (right) after winning at Assen in 1969.
- Nationality: Australian
- Born: 8 March 1940 (age 86); Macclesfield, England
Motorcycle racing career statistics
Grand Prix motorcycle racing
| Active years | 1965 - 1969, 1971, 1979, 1980 - 1981 |
| First race | 1965 Spanish Grand Prix |
| Last race | 1981 125cc Argentine Grand Prix |
| First win | 1968 Isle of Man 50cc Ultra-Lightweight TT |
| Last win | 1979 125cc Belgian Grand Prix |
| Team | Derbi |
Starts / Wins / Podiums / Poles / F. laps / Points; 30 / 4 / 10 / N/A / 2 / 174

Barry Smith (born 8 March 1940) is an Australian former professional Grand Prix motorcycle road racer.

== Motorcycle racing career ==
Smith was born in Macclesfield, England, where he bought his first motorcycle, a 250cc BSA. By 1959, his family had emigrated to Australia and Smith began motorcycle racing against Australian riders such as Kel Carruthers and Tom Phillis.

The need for more competition led Smith back to Europe where he competed in the Grand Prix world championships from 1963 to 1981. His best seasons were in 1968 and 1969 when he finished third in the 50cc world championship. He also won the 1968 Isle of Man 50cc Ultra-Lightweight TT, achieving the first Grand Prix win for Spanish manufacturer Derbi.

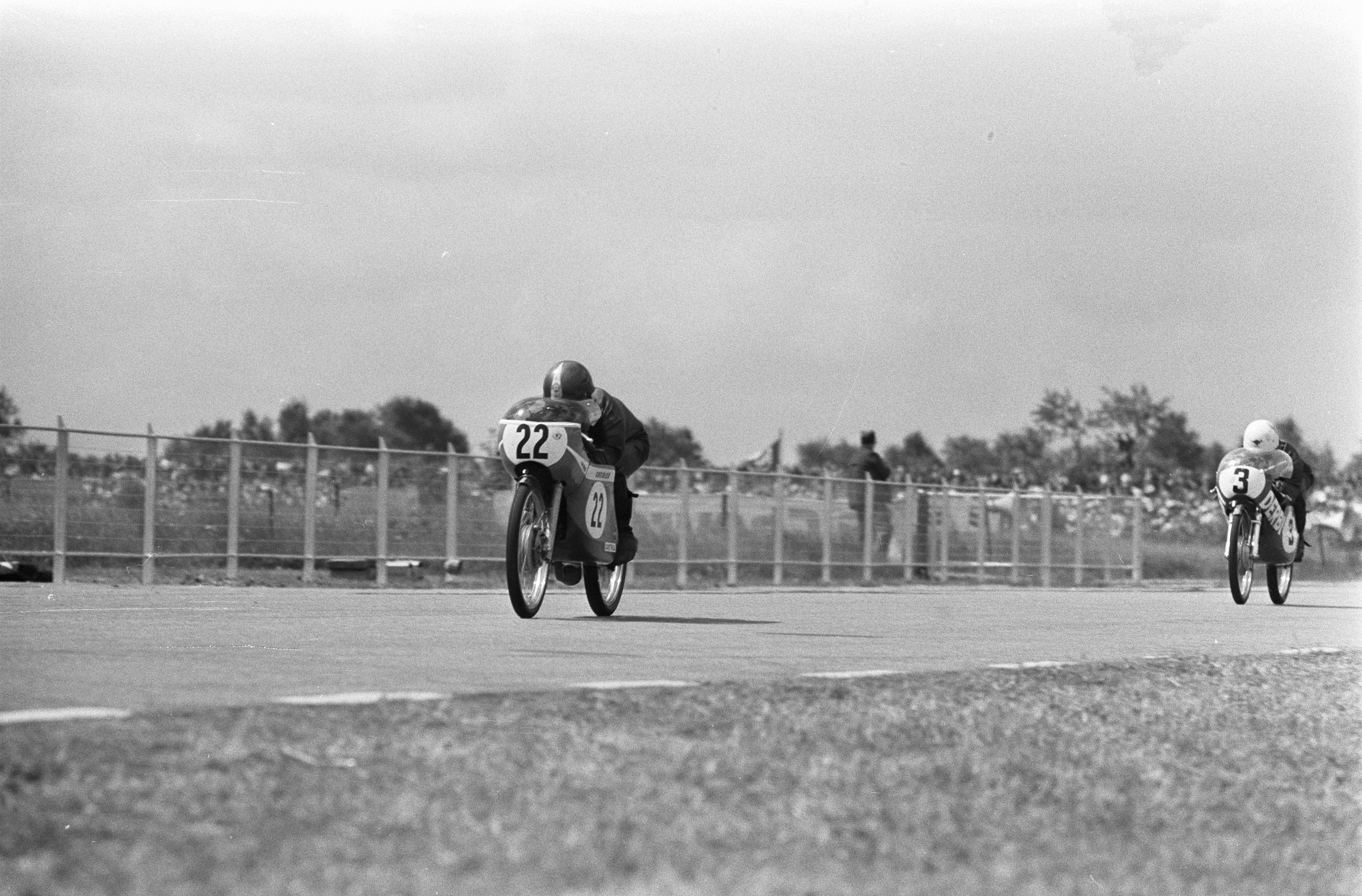
Barry Smith (3) pursues Jan de Vries (22) during the 1969 50cc Dutch TT.

Smith won three consecutive victories in the Formula III Class at the Isle of Man TT from 1979 to 1981. He has also won more Isle of Man TT races than any other Australian, 5 in total, 1968 250cc Production, 1968 50cc, 1979 Formula TT, 1980 Formula TT and 1981 Formula TT. He also won the 1979 and 1981 Formula III Class in the Formula TT world championship. Smith also won the 125 Australian national championships in 1978 and 1981. He retired in 1983 after 25 years of competitive racing. Smith won four Grand Prix races during his career.

Sporting positions
| Preceded by Bill Smith | TT Formula Three World Champion; 1979 | Succeeded by Ron Haslam |
| Preceded by Ron Haslam | TT Formula Three World Champion; 1981 | Succeeded by none |
