= Mick Chatterton =

British motorcycle racer

- Nationality: (United Kingdom) British
- Born: 26 March 1940 (age 86)
Motorcycle racing career statistics
Grand Prix motorcycle racing
Active years	1967, 1969 – 1972
First race	1967 Isle of Man 250cc Lightweight TT
Last race	1972 Isle of Man 350cc Junior TT
Starts / Wins / Podiums / Poles / F. laps / Points; 8 / 0 / 0 / N/A / N/A / 31

Mick Chatterton (born 26 March 1940) is a former Grand Prix motorcycle road racer. His best season was in 1969 when he finished the year in 16th place in the 250cc world championship. His last TT race was the 2004 lightweight 125.
