= 1969 Isle of Man TT =

Annual motorcycle racing event

The 1969 Isle of Man TT, the fourth round of the 1969 Grand Prix motorcycle racing season, involved a number of races on the Mountain Course on the Isle of Man. For the second year running Giacomo Agostini won both the Junior and Senior races, completing the six laps of the latter race in 2:09.40.2 to win by almost nine minutes. There were three "production" categories; Malcolm Uphill won the 750 cc, Graham Penny the 500 cc and Mike Rogers the 250 cc. German pairs won both sidecar events; Klaus Enders and Ralf Engelhardt in the 500 cc and Siegfried Schauzu and H.Schneider in the 750 cc. Kel Carruthers won the Lightweight 250 cc race, while Dave Simmonds won the Lightweight 125 cc.

== 1969 Isle of Man Production 750 cc TT final standings ==
3 Laps (113.00 Miles) Mountain Course.

Rank	Rider	Team	Speed	Time
1	(Wales) Malcolm Uphill	Triumph	99.99 mph	1.07.55.4
2	(United Kingdom) Paul Smart	Norton	99.37 mph	1.08.21.2
3	(United Kingdom) Darryl Pendlebury	Triumph	99.66 mph	1.10.16.2
4	(United Kingdom) Mick Andrew	Norton	95.18 mph	1.11.21.8
5	(United Kingdom) Steve Jolly	Triumph	93.19 mph	1.12.53.0
6	(United Kingdom) Tony Jefferies	Triumph	93.13 mph	1.12.56.2
7	(United Kingdom) Martin Carney	Triumph	93.00 mph	1.13.02.0
8	(United Kingdom) Pat Mohoney	BSA	92.39 mph	1.13.30.8
9	(United Kingdom) Paul Butler	Triumph	91.09 mph	1.14.34.0
10	(United Kingdom) Len Phelps	Triumph	90.76 mph	1.14.50.0

== 1969 Isle of Man Production 500 cc TT final standings ==
3 Laps (113.00 Miles) Mountain Course.

Rank	Rider	Team	Speed	Time
1	(United Kingdom) Graham Penny	Honda	88.18 mph	1.17.01.6
2	(United Kingdom) Ray Knight	Triumph	87.64 mph	1.17.30.4
3	(United Kingdom) Ron Baylie	Triumph	85.90 mph	1.19.04.0
4	(United Kingdom) Adrian T Cooper	Suzuki	85.17 mph	1.19.45.4
5	(United Kingdom) Hugh Evans	BSA	85.17 mph	1.19.45.6
6	(United Kingdom) Mick Chatterton	Triumph	83.97 mph	1.20.53.6
7	(United Kingdom) Brian Warburton	Triumph	82.21 mph	1.22.37.8
8	(United Kingdom) A.Allen	Triumph	74.87 mph	1.30.43.6

== 1969 Isle of Man Production 250 cc TT final standings ==
3 Laps (113.00 Miles) Mountain Course.

Rank	Rider	Team	Speed	Time
1	(United Kingdom) Mike Rogers	Ducati	88.79 mph	1.21.03.8
2	(United Kingdom) Frank Whiteway	Suzuki	88.29 mph	1.21.33.4
3	(United Kingdom) Chas Mortimer	Ducati	82.01 mph	1.22.49.6
4	(United Kingdom) George E.Leigh	Bultaco	81.26 mph	1.23.35.2
5	(United Kingdom) Clive Thompsett	Ducati	80.18 mph	1.24.43.2
6	(United Kingdom) Bill G Benson	Suzuki	79.21 mph	1.24.45.4
7	(United Kingdom) T.Holdsworth	Suzuki	78.87 mph	1.26.18.6
8	(United Kingdom) Tom Loughridge	Suzuki	76.00 mph	1.26.18.6
9	(United Kingdom) Charlie Mates	Yamaha	75.40 mph	1.30.14.6
10	(United Kingdom) John Williams	Honda	68.60 mph	1.39.35.6

== 1969 Isle of Man Sidecar 500 cc TT final standings ==
3 Laps (113.2 Miles) Mountain Course.

Place	Rider	Number	Country	Machine	Speed	Time	Points
1	(West Germany) Klaus Enders/Ralf Engelhardt		West Germany	BMW	92.48 mph	1:13.27.0	15
2	(West Germany) Siegfried Schauzu/H.Schneider		West Germany	BMW	90.99 mph	1:14.39.4	12
3	(West Germany) Helmut Fath/W.Kalauch		West Germany	URS named after Fath's hometown Ursenbach	90.56 mph	1:15.0.0	10
4	(West Germany) Arseneus Butscher/J.Huber		West Germany	BMW	83.55 mph	1:21.18.0	8
5	(West Germany) F.Linnarz/P.Kuehnmund		West Germany	BMW	81.96 mph	1:22.52.0	6
6	(United Kingdom) Dick Hawes/J.Mann		United Kingdom	Seeley	81.73 mph	1:23.06.6	5
7	(United Kingdom) Norman Hanks/Rose Hanks		United Kingdom	BSA	81.00 mph	1:23.51.4	4
8	(United Kingdom) Bill Copson/Dane Rowe		United Kingdom	BMW	80.34 mph	1:24.32.8	3
9	(United Kingdom) Dennis Keen/M.S.Wotherspoon		United Kingdom	Triumph	78.31 mph	1:26.44.0	2
10	(United Kingdom) T Harris/B.L.Harris		United Kingdom	Triumph	78.31 mph	1:26.44.0	1

== 1969 Isle of Man Sidecar 750 cc TT final standings ==
3 Laps (113.00 Miles) Mountain Course.

Rank	Rider	Team	Speed	Time
1	(West Germany) Siegfried Schauzu/H.Schneider	BMW	89.83 mph	1.15.36.8
2	(United Kingdom) Peter Brown/Mick Casey	BSA	85.65 mph	1.19.18.2
3	(United Kingdom) Bill Currie/F.Kay	LWC	81.72 mph	1.23.07.4
4	(United Kingdom) Mick Boddice/Clive Pollington	BSA	81.02 mph	1.23.50.4
5	(United Kingdom) Derek Plummer/Malcolm Brett	Triumph	80.06 mph	1.24.16.2
6	(United Kingdom) Mick Horsepole/G.J.Horsepole	Triumph	80.53 mph	1.24.32.2
7	(United Kingdom) Gordon Fox/H.Sanderson	Triumph	76.89 mph	1.25.01.2
8	(United Kingdom) Bill Cooper/D B Argent	WEC	79.58 mph	1.25.21.0
9	(United Kingdom) Bob Kewley/D.Tucker	BSA	78.61 mph	1.26.24.0
10	(United Kingdom) Denis Kneen/M.E.Wotherspoon	Triumph	78.48 mph	1.26.33.0

== 1969 Isle of Man Lightweight TT 250 cc final standings ==
6 Laps (226.38 Miles) Mountain Course.

Place	Rider	Number	Country	Machine	Speed	Time	Points
1	(Australia) Kel Carruthers		Australia	Benelli	95.95 mph	2:21.35.2	15
2	(United Kingdom) Frank Perris		United Kingdom	Suzuki	93.69 mph	2:24.59.4	12
3	(Spain) Santiago Herrero		Spain	Ossa	92.82 mph	2:26.21.0	10
4	(United Kingdom) Mick Chatterton		United Kingdom	Yamaha	91.96 mph	2:29.01.0	8
5	(United Kingdom) Frank Whiteway		United Kingdom	Suzuki	90.13 mph	2:30.41.4	6
6	(United Kingdom) Derek Chatterton		United Kingdom	Yamaha	89.51 mph	2:31.46.0	5
7	(United Kingdom) Stan Woods		United Kingdom	Yamaha	89.22 mph	2:32.15.2	4
8	(Czechoslovakia) František Šťastný		Czechoslovakia	Jawa	89.11 mph	2:32.25.2	3
9	(United Kingdom) Ian Richards		United Kingdom	Yamaha	88.08 mph	2:34.13.0	2
10	(United Kingdom) Gordon Keith		United Kingdom	Yamaha	88.00 mph	2:34.22.0	1

== 1969 Isle of Man Lightweight TT 125 cc final standings ==
3 Laps (113.00 Miles) Mountain Course.

Place	Rider	Number	Country	Machine	Speed	Time	Points
1	(United Kingdom) Dave Simmonds		United Kingdom	Kawasaki	91.08 mph	1:14.34.6	15
2	(Australia) Kel Carruthers		Australia	Aermacchi	84.43 mph	1:20.27.2	12
3	(United Kingdom) Garry Dickinson		United Kingdom	Honda	83.67 mph	1:21.10.6	10
4	(United Kingdom) Steve Murray		United Kingdom	Honda	83.24 mph	1:21.36.2	8
5	(United Kingdom) John Kiddie		United Kingdom	Honda	81.05 mph	1:23.48.0	6
6	(United Kingdom) Carl Ward		United Kingdom	Bultaco	80.58 mph	1:24.17.8	5
7	(United Kingdom) John Shacklady		United Kingdom	Bultaco	80.27 mph	1:24.37.0	4
8	(United Kingdom) Charles Garner		United Kingdom	Bultaco	70.14 mph	1:25.49.6	3
9	(France) J Pasquiet		France	Bultaco	78.39 mph	1:26.39.2	2
10	(United Kingdom) Tom Loughridge		United Kingdom	Bultaco	77.88 mph	1:27.12.8	1

== 1969 Isle of Man Junior TT 350 cc final standings ==
6 Laps (236.38 Miles) Mountain Course.

Place	Rider	Number	Country	Machine	Speed	Time	Points
1	(Italy) Giacomo Agostini		Italy	MV Agusta	101.81 mph	2:13.25.4	15
2	(Northern Ireland) Brian Steenson		United Kingdom	Aermacchi	94.60 mph	2:23.36.4	12
3	(Australia) Jack Findlay		Australia	Aermacchi	93.89 mph	2:24.41.2	10
4	(United Kingdom) Tom Dickie		United Kingdom	Seeley	92.90 mph	2:26.13.0	8
5	(United Kingdom) Terry Grotefeld		United Kingdom	Seeley	92.58 mph	2:26.44.0	6
6	(Wales) Selwyn Griffiths		United Kingdom	AJS	90.89 mph	2:29.27.6	5
7	(United Kingdom) John Findlay		United Kingdom	Norton	90.87 mph	2:29.29.4	4
8	(Scotland) Billy Guthrie		United Kingdom	Yamaha	90.65 mph	2:29.51.8	3
9	(United Kingdom) M.Hatherall		United Kingdom	Aermacchi	90.63 mph	2:29.53.6	2
10	(United Kingdom) R.Graham		United Kingdom	Aermacchi	90.03 mph	2:30.53.0	1

== 1969 Isle of Man Senior TT 500 cc final standings ==
6 Laps (236.38 Miles) Mountain Course.

Place	Rider	Number	Country	Machine	Speed	Time	Points
1	(Italy) Giacomo Agostini		Italy	MV Agusta	104.75 mph	2:09.40.2	15
2	(United Kingdom) Alan Barnett		United Kingdom	Metisse	98.28 mph	2:18.12.6	12
3	(United Kingdom) Tom Dickie		United Kingdom	Seeley	97.92 mph	2:18.44.2	10
4	(United Kingdom) Derek Woodman		United Kingdom	Seeley	97.69 mph	2:19.03.4	8
5	(United Kingdom) John Findlay		United Kingdom	Norton	96.17 mph	2:21.15.6	6
6	(United Kingdom) Ron Chandler		United Kingdom	Seeley	95.87 mph	2:21.42.8	5
7	(United Kingdom) Steve Jolly		United Kingdom	Seeley	93.78 mph	2:24.51.8	4
8	(Wales) Selwyn Griffiths		United Kingdom	Matchless	93.30 mph	2:25.36.8	3
9	(United Kingdom) Peter Darvill		United Kingdom	Norton	93.29 mph	2:25.37.6	2
10	(United Kingdom) Steve Spencer		United Kingdom	Metisse	92.98 mph	2:26.06.0	1
