= Heinz Rosner =

German motorcycle racer (born 1939)

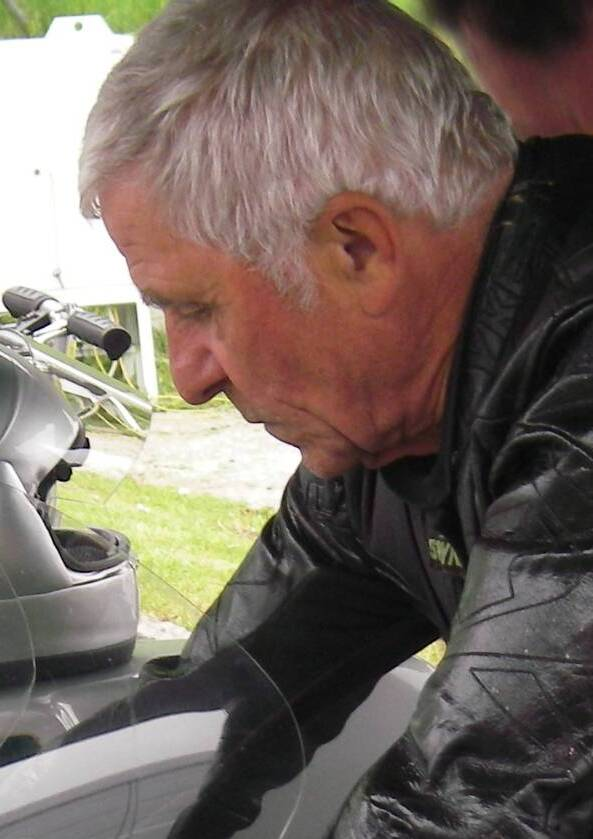
- Nationality: (East Germany) East German
Motorcycle racing career statistics
Grand Prix motorcycle racing
Active years	1964 - 1969
First race	1964 125cc East German Grand Prix
Last race	1969 250cc Nations Grand Prix
Team	MZ
Starts / Wins / Podiums / Poles / F. laps / Points; 46 / 0 / 26 / N/A / N/A / 202

Heinz Rosner (born 14 January 1939) is a former Grand Prix motorcycle road racer from the former East Germany.

Rosner had his best year in 1968 when he rode for the MZ factory racing team to finish the 250cc season in third place behind Yamaha teammates Phil Read and Bill Ivy. That same year, he claimed fourth place in the 350cc world championship. Rosner rode for the MZ factory for his entire career. He also sets the records for the most podiums in Gran Prix motorcycle racing history (26) without ever winning a race. He has continued to race the MZ as recently as 2010, gaining podiums at Classic meetings such as Schleiz in Germany and this despite suffering some severe injuries in a crash at the Hockenheimring in 2005.
