= Billie Nelson =

British motorcycle racer

- Nationality: (United Kingdom) British
Motorcycle racing career statistics
Grand Prix motorcycle racing
| Active years | 1965, 1967 – 1974 |
| First race | 1965 500cc German Grand Prix |
| Last race | 1974 500cc Swedish Grand Prix |
| Team | Paton |
| Championships | 0 |
Starts / Wins / Podiums / Poles / F. laps / Points; 64 / 0 / 6 / 0 / 0 / 261

Billie Nelson (2 November 1941 – 8 September 1974) was a British professional Grand Prix motorcycle road racer.

Nelson's best season was in 1969 when he finished the year in fourth place in the 500cc world championship. He also passengered for Charlie Freeman on his Norton Manx sidecar racer in British and International races for a number of seasons in the 1960s.

Nelson was killed at the Opatija Circuit during the 1974 250cc Yugoslavian Grand Prix when he crashed into the crowd, injuring several spectators. He died later that night at a hospital, aged 32. He was buried at Eckington Cemetery in Derbyshire, England.
