= Silvio Grassetti =

Italian motorcycle racer (1936–2018)

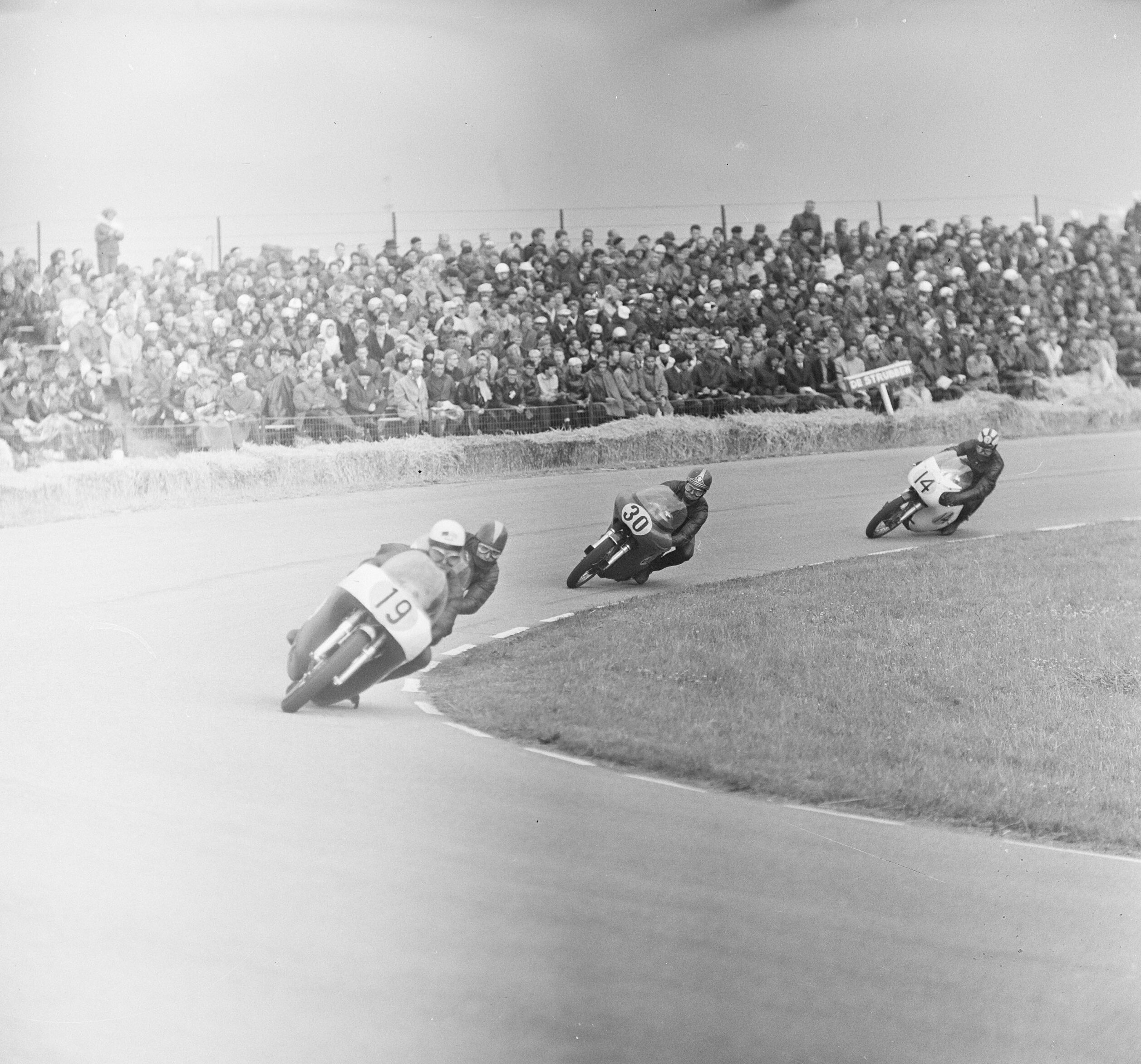
- Race at Dutch TT in 1966, Silvio Grassetti number 30, Stuart Graham 19 and John Cooper 14.
- Nationality: Italian
- Born: 24 February 1936; Montecchio, Sant'Angelo in Lizzola
- Died: 9 September 2018 (aged 82); Montecchio, Sant'Angelo in Lizzola
Motorcycle racing career statistics
Grand Prix motorcycle racing
Active years	1961 - 1963, 1965 - 1973,
First race	1959 250cc Dutch TT
Last race	1973 250cc Dutch TT
First win	1969 350cc Yugoslavian Grand Prix
Last win	1971 250cc Belgian Grand Prix
Team(s)	Bianchi, Benelli, Moto Morini, Jawa, MZ
Starts / Wins / Podiums / Poles / F. laps / Points; 44 / 3 / 21 / 0 / 3 / 270

Silvio Grassetti (24 February 1936 – 9 September 2018) was an Italian professional Grand Prix motorcycle road racer.

== Motorcycle racing career ==
Grassetti was born in Montecchio, Sant'Angelo in Lizzola. The son of a Benelli employee, he began his racing career as a privateer Benelli racer. He made his Grand Prix debut as a Benelli factory rider in 1959. His best year was in 1969 when he finished second to Giacomo Agostini in the 350cc world championship. In 1971, Grassetti won the 250cc Austrian and Belgian Grand Prix races, but inconsistent results relegated him to only seventh place in the championship. He retired in 1974 after suffering serious injuries at the Spa-Francorchamps circuit in Belgium. Grassetti won three Grand Prix races in his career.
