= Klaus Enders =

German Sidecar racer (1937–2019)

- Nationality: German
- Born: 2 May 1937; Wetzlar, Germany
- Died: 20 January 2019 (aged 81)
Motorcycle racing career statistics
Grand Prix motorcycle racing
Active years	1960–1974
First race	1960 Belgian Sidecar Grand Prix
Last race	1974 Czechoslovak Grand Prix
First win	1967 West German Sidecar Grand Prix
Last win	1974 Dutch Sidecar TT
Team	BMW
Championships	6
Starts / Wins / Podiums / Poles / F. laps / Points; / 27 / / N/A / N/A
Isle of Man TT career
TTs contested	8 (1966 – 1970, 1972 – 1974)
TT wins	4
First TT win	1969 Sidecar TT
Last TT win	1973 Sidecar TT
TT podiums	5

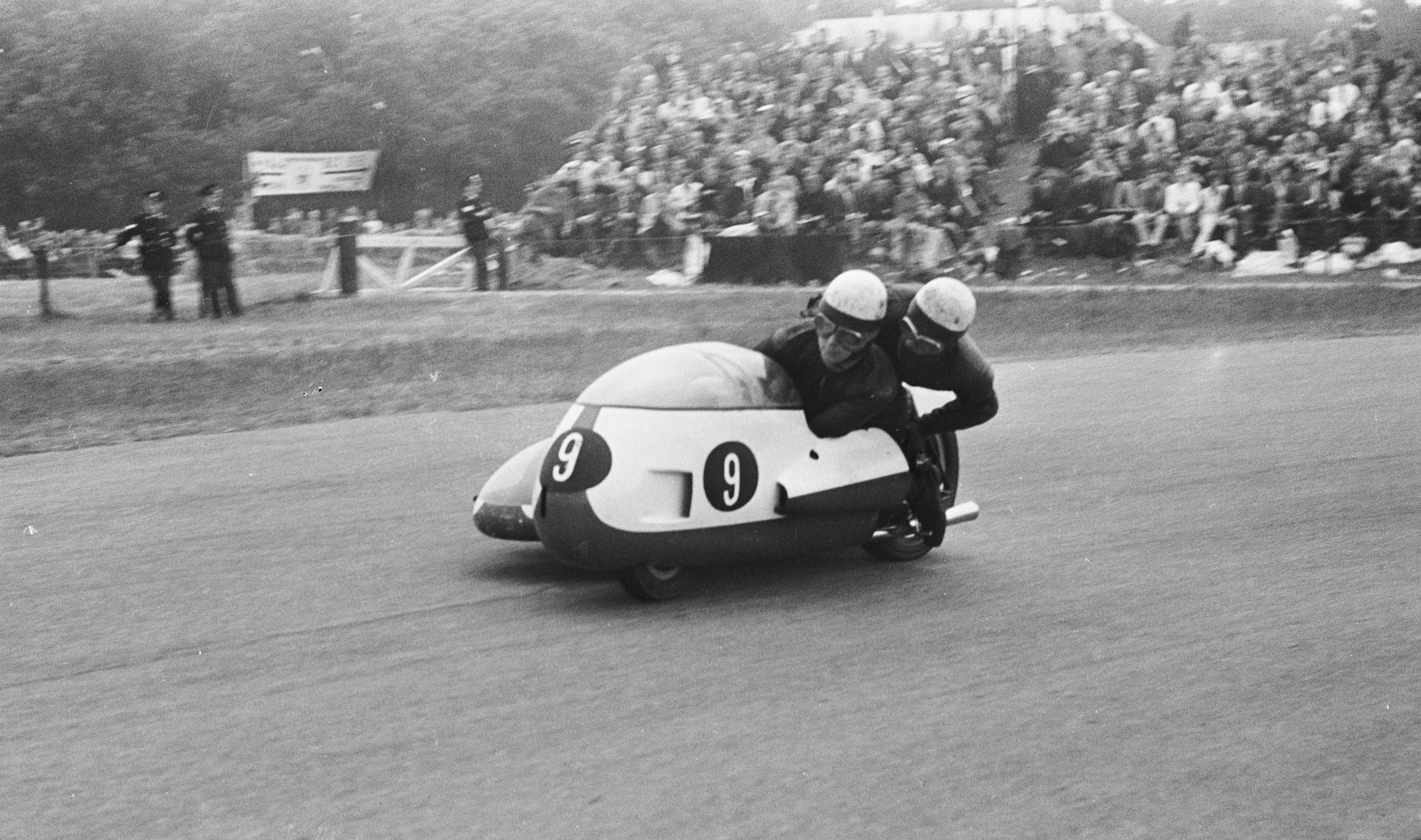
Enders competing in a sidecar race

Klaus Enders (2 May 1937 – 20 January 2019) was a German sidecar racer. He was a six-time FIM Sidecar World Champion and a four-time winner of the sidecar class at the Isle of Man TT. Enders decided to retire at the end of the 1970 season and try car racing, only to return to sidecars a year later, winning three more world titles before retiring for good at the end of 1974. His co-drivers were Wolfgang Kalauch and Ralf Engelhardt.

Enders died on 20 January 2019 at the age of 81 following a long illness.

Sporting positions
Preceded by Fritz Scheidegger with John Robinson	World Sidecar Champion with Ralf Engelhardt; 1967	Succeeded by Helmut Fath with Wolfgang Kalauch
Preceded by Helmut Fath with Wolfgang Kalauch	World Sidecar Champion with Ralf Engelhardt (1969); 1969–1970; With: Ralf Engelhardt and Wolfgang Kalauch (1970)	Succeeded by Horst Owesle with Julius Kremer and Peter Rutterford
Preceded by Horst Owesle with Julius Kremer and Peter Rutterford	World Sidecar Champion with Ralf Engelhardt; 1972–1974	Succeeded by Rolf Steinhausen with Josef Huber
