= List of 500cc/MotoGP race winners =

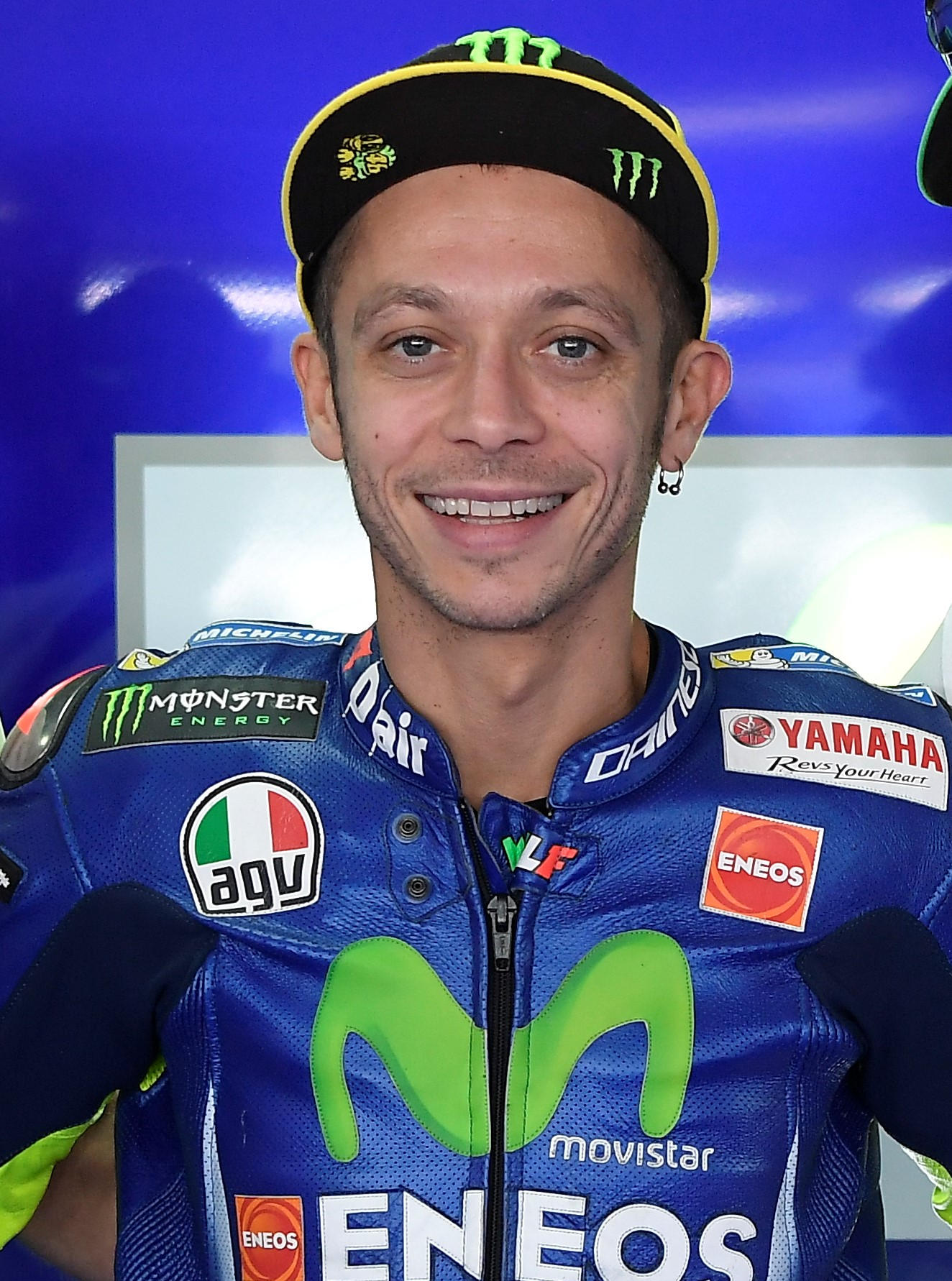
Valentino Rossi, who won a record 89 500cc/MotoGP Grands Prix during his career

Grand Prix motorcycle racing is the premier championship of motorcycle road racing, which has been divided into three classes: MotoGP, Moto2, and Moto3. Former classes that have been discontinued include 350cc, 250cc, 125cc, 50cc/80cc, MotoE, and Sidecar. The premier class is MotoGP, which was formerly known as the 500cc class. The Grand Prix Road-Racing World Championship was established in 1949 by the sport's governing body the Fédération Internationale de Motocyclisme (FIM), and is the oldest motorsport world championship in existence. The motorcycles used in MotoGP are purpose-built for the sport, and are unavailable for purchase by the general public because they cannot be legally ridden on public roads.

Valentino Rossi holds the record for the most race wins in the premier class with 89. Marc Márquez is second with 80 wins, and Giacomo Agostini is third with 68 wins. Dani Pedrosa holds the record for most career wins without winning the championship with 31.

== By rider ==
As of the 2026 MotoGP Portuguese Grand Prix

Key
*	MotoGP/500cc World Champion
†	Grand Prix World Champion
**Bold**	Rider has competed in the 2026 MotoGP season

Grand Prix motorcycle racing winners
Rank	Country	Rider	Wins	Seasons active	First win	Last win
1	ITA	Valentino Rossi*	89	2000–2021	2000 500cc British Grand Prix	2017 MotoGP Dutch TT
2	ESP	**Marc Márquez***	80	2013–	2013 MotoGP Grand Prix of the Americas	2026 MotoGP Malaysian Grand Prix
3	ITA	Giacomo Agostini*	68	1965–1977	1965 500cc Finnish Grand Prix	1976 500cc West German Grand Prix
4	AUS	Mick Doohan*	54	1989–1999	1990 500cc Hungarian Grand Prix	1998 500cc Argentine Grand Prix
5	ESP	Jorge Lorenzo*	47	2008–2019	2008 MotoGP Portuguese Grand Prix	2018 MotoGP Austrian Grand Prix
6	AUS	Casey Stoner*	38	2006–2012	2007 MotoGP Qatar Grand Prix	2012 MotoGP Australian Grand Prix
7	UK	Mike Hailwood*	37	1958–1967	1961 500cc Isle of Man TT	1967 500cc Canadian Grand Prix
8	USA	Eddie Lawson*	31	1983–1992	1984 500cc South African Grand Prix	1992 500cc Hungarian Grand Prix
8	ESP	Dani Pedrosa†	31	2006–2018; 2021; 2023–2024	2006 MotoGP Chinese Grand Prix	2017 MotoGP Valencian Grand Prix
8	ITA	**Francesco Bagnaia***	31	2019–	2021 MotoGP Aragon Grand Prix	2025 MotoGP Japanese Grand Prix
11	USA	Kevin Schwantz*	25	1986–1995	1988 500cc Japanese Grand Prix	1994 500cc British Grand Prix
12	USA	Wayne Rainey*	24	1988–1993	1988 500cc British Grand Prix	1993 500cc Czech Republic Grand Prix
13	UK	Geoff Duke*	22	1950–1959	1950 500cc Isle of Man TT	1958 500cc Swedish Grand Prix
13	UK	John Surtees*	22	1952; 1954–1960	1956 500cc Isle of Man TT	1960 500cc Nations Grand Prix
13	USA	Kenny Roberts*	22	1978–1983	1978 500cc Austrian Grand Prix	1983 500cc San Marino Grand Prix
16	USA	Freddie Spencer*	20	1980–1987; 1989; 1993	1982 500cc Belgian Grand Prix	1985 500cc Swedish Grand Prix
17	UK	Barry Sheene*	19	1974–1984	1975 500cc Dutch TT	1981 500cc Swedish Grand Prix
18	AUS	Wayne Gardner*	18	1983–1992	1986 500cc Spanish Grand Prix	1992 500cc British Grand Prix
19	ESP	Àlex Crivillé*	15	1992–2001	1992 500cc Dutch TT	2000 500cc French Grand Prix
19	ITA	Andrea Dovizioso†	15	2008–2022	2009 MotoGP British Grand Prix	2020 MotoGP Austrian Grand Prix
21	USA	Randy Mamola	13	1979–1990; 1992	1980 500cc Belgian Grand Prix	1987 500cc San Marino Grand Prix
21	ITA	Max Biaggi†	13	1998–2005	1998 500cc Japanese Grand Prix	2004 MotoGP German Grand Prix
21	ITA	**Marco Bezzecchi**	13	2022–	2023 MotoGP Argentine Grand Prix	2026 MotoGP Portuguese Grand Prix
24	UK	Phil Read*	11	1961–1964; 1971; 1973–1976	1964 500cc Ulster Grand Prix	1975 500cc Czechoslovak Grand Prix
24	FRA	**Fabio Quartararo***	11	2019–	2020 MotoGP Spanish Grand Prix	2022 MotoGP German Grand Prix
26	ESP	**Maverick Viñales**†	10	2015–	2016 MotoGP British Grand Prix	2024 MotoGP Grand Prix of the Americas
27	ESP	Sete Gibernau	9	1997–2006; 2009	2001 500cc Valencian Grand Prix	2004 MotoGP Qatar Grand Prix
27	ITA	Loris Capirossi†	9	1995–1996; 2000–2011	1996 500cc Australian Grand Prix	2007 MotoGP Japanese Grand Prix
27	ESP	**Jorge Martín***	9	2021–	2021 MotoGP Styrian Grand Prix	2026 MotoGP French Grand Prix
30	RAN	Gary Hocking*	8	1958–1959; 1961–1962	1961 500cc West German Grand Prix	1962 500cc Isle of Man TT
30	ITA	Luca Cadalora†	8	1989; 1993–2000	1993 500cc British Grand Prix	1996 500cc German Grand Prix
30	USA	Kenny Roberts Jr.*	8	1996–2007	1999 500cc Malaysian Grand Prix	2000 500cc Pacific Grand Prix
33	BRA	Alex Barros	7	1990–2005; 2007	1993 500cc FIM Grand Prix	2005 MotoGP Portuguese Grand Prix
33	ITA	**Enea Bastianini**†	7	2021–	2022 MotoGP Qatar Grand Prix	2024 MotoGP Emilia Romagna Grand Prix
35	ITA	Umberto Masetti*	6	1950–1952; 1954–1958	1950 500cc Belgian Grand Prix	1955 500cc Nations Grand Prix
35	ITA	Marco Lucchinelli*	6	1975–1986	1980 500cc German Grand Prix	1981 500cc Finnish Grand Prix
35	ESP	**Álex Rins**	6	2017–	2019 MotoGP Grand Prix of the Americas	2023 MotoGP Grand Prix of the Americas
38	UK	Leslie Graham*	5	1949–1953	1949 500cc Swiss Grand Prix	1952 500cc Spanish Grand Prix
38	NED	Wil Hartog	5	1972–1973; 1975–1981	1977 500cc Dutch TT	1980 500cc Finnish Grand Prix
38	ITA	Franco Uncini*	5	1979–1985	1982 500cc Austrian Grand Prix	1982 500cc British Grand Prix
38	ITA	Marco Melandri†	5	2003–2010; 2015	2005 MotoGP Turkish Grand Prix	2006 MotoGP Australian Grand Prix
38	PRT	Miguel Oliveira	5	2019–2025	2020 MotoGP Styrian Grand Prix	2022 MotoGP Thailand Grand Prix
43	IRL	Reg Armstrong	4	1949–1956	1952 500cc Isle of Man TT	1956 500cc West German Grand Prix
43	ITA	Libero Liberati*	4	1952–1953; 1955–1957	1957 500cc German Grand Prix	1957 500cc Nations Grand Prix
43	USA	John Kocinski†	4	1989; 1991–1994; 1998–1999	1991 500cc Malaysian Grand Prix	1994 500cc Australian Grand Prix
43	JPN	Tadayuki Okada	4	1996–2000; 2008	1997 500cc Indonesian Grand Prix	1999 500cc Australian Grand Prix
43	AUS	**Jack Miller**	4	2015–	2016 MotoGP Dutch TT	2022 MotoGP Japanese Grand Prix
43	ESP	**Álex Márquez**†	4	2020–	2025 MotoGP Spanish Grand Prix	2026 MotoGP Spanish Grand Prix
49	ITA	Alfredo Milani	3	1950–1957	1951 500cc French Grand Prix	1953 500cc Belgian Grand Prix
49	UK	John Hartle	3	1955–1956; 1958–1960; 1963–1964; 1967–1968	1956 500cc Ulster Grand Prix	1963 500cc Dutch TT
49	ITA	Alberto Pagani	3	1960–1961; 1968–1972	1969 500cc Nations Grand Prix	1972 500cc Yugoslavian Grand Prix
49	AUS	Jack Findlay	3	1958–1978	1971 500cc Ulster Grand Prix	1977 500cc Austrian Grand Prix
49	USA	Pat Hennen	3	1976–1978	1976 500cc Finnish Grand Prix	1978 500cc Spanish Grand Prix
49	VEN	Johnny Cecotto†	3	1976–1980	1977 500cc Finnish Grand Prix	1978 500cc Dutch TT
49	AUS	Daryl Beattie	3	1992–1997	1993 500cc German Grand Prix	1995 500cc German Grand Prix
49	JPN	Norifumi Abe	3	1994–2004	1996 500cc Japanese Grand Prix	2000 500cc Japanese Grand Prix
49	AUS	Garry McCoy	3	1998–2004; 2006	2000 500cc South African Grand Prix	2000 500cc Valencian Grand Prix
49	USA	Nicky Hayden*	3	2003–2016	2005 MotoGP United States Grand Prix	2006 MotoGP United States Grand Prix
49	UK	**Cal Crutchlow**	3	2011–2023; 2026	2016 MotoGP Czech Republic Grand Prix	2018 MotoGP Argentine Grand Prix
49	ITA	**Franco Morbidelli**†	3	2018–	2020 MotoGP San Marino Grand Prix	2020 MotoGP Valencian Grand Prix
49	ESP	**Aleix Espargaró**	3	2009–2010; 2012–2026	2022 MotoGP Argentine Grand Prix	2023 MotoGP Catalan Grand Prix
62	ITA	Nello Pagani†	2	1949–1955	1949 500cc Dutch TT	1949 500cc Nations Grand Prix
62	UK	Fergus Anderson†	2	1951; 1953–1954	1951 500cc Swiss Grand Prix	1953 500cc Spanish Grand Prix
62	SRA	Ray Amm	2	1951–1954	1953 500cc Isle of Man TT	1954 500cc Isle of Man TT
62	RAN	Jim Redman†	2	1959–1960; 1966	1966 500cc West German Grand Prix	1966 500cc Dutch TT
62	FIN	Jarno Saarinen†	2	1973	1973 500cc French Grand Prix	1973 500cc Austrian Grand Prix
62	ITA	Virginio Ferrari	2	1976–1985	1978 500cc German Grand Prix	1979 500cc Dutch TT
62	NED	Jack Middelburg	2	1977–1983	1980 500cc Dutch TT	1981 500cc British Grand Prix
62	ESP	Carlos Checa	2	1995–2007; 2010	1996 500cc Catalan Grand Prix	1998 500cc Madrid Grand Prix
62	JPN	Makoto Tamada	2	2003–2007	2004 MotoGP Rio de Janeiro Grand Prix	2004 MotoGP Japanese Grand Prix
62	ITA	Danilo Petrucci	2	2012–2023	2019 MotoGP Italian Grand Prix	2020 MotoGP French Grand Prix
62	ZAF	**Brad Binder**†	2	2020–	2020 MotoGP Czech Republic Grand Prix	2021 MotoGP Austrian Grand Prix
62	FRA	**Johann Zarco**†	2	2017–	2023 MotoGP Australian Grand Prix	2025 MotoGP French Grand Prix
62	ITA	**Fabio Di Giannantonio**	2	2022–	2023 MotoGP Qatar Grand Prix	2026 MotoGP Catalan Grand Prix
62	ESP	**Raúl Fernández**	2	2022–	2025 MotoGP Australian Grand Prix	2026 MotoGP British Grand Prix
76	UK	Harold Daniell	1	1949–1950	1949 500cc Isle of Man TT	1949 500cc Isle of Man TT
76	UK	Bill Doran	1	1949; 1951–1953	1949 500cc Belgian Grand Prix	1949 500cc Belgian Grand Prix
76	UK	Jack Brett	1	1949–1957; 1959–1960	1952 500cc Swiss Grand Prix	1952 500cc Swiss Grand Prix
76	UK	Cromie McCandless	1	1949–1952	1952 500cc Ulster Grand Prix	1952 500cc Ulster Grand Prix
76	AUS	Ken Kavanagh	1	1951–1955; 1959	1953 500cc Ulster Grand Prix	1953 500cc Ulster Grand Prix
76	FRA	Pierre Monneret	1	1953–1956	1954 500cc French Grand Prix	1954 500cc French Grand Prix
76	UK	Dickie Dale	1	1950; 1953–1960	1954 500cc Spanish Grand Prix	1954 500cc Spanish Grand Prix
76	ITA	Giuseppe Colnago	1	1952–1953; 1955; 1957	1955 500cc Belgian Grand Prix	1955 500cc Belgian Grand Prix
76	UK	Bill Lomas†	1	1952; 1954–1956	1955 500cc Ulster Grand Prix	1955 500cc Ulster Grand Prix
76	UK	Bob McIntyre	1	1954–1961	1957 500cc Isle of Man TT	1957 500cc Isle of Man TT
76	ITA	Remo Venturi	1	1958–1960; 1962; 1964	1960 500cc Dutch TT	1960 500cc Dutch TT
76	ARG	Jorge Kissling	1	1961–1963	1961 500cc Argentine Grand Prix	1961 500cc Argentine Grand Prix
76	UK	Alan Shepherd	1	1959–1960; 1962–1963	1962 500cc Finnish Grand Prix	1962 500cc Finnish Grand Prix
76	ARG	Benedicto Caldarella	1	1962–1964	1962 500cc Argentine Grand Prix	1962 500cc Argentine Grand Prix
76	AUS	Jack Ahearn	1	1954–1955; 1958; 1962–1966	1964 500cc Finnish Grand Prix	1964 500cc Finnish Grand Prix
76	UK	Dick Creith	1	1964–1965	1965 500cc Ulster Grand Prix	1965 500cc Ulster Grand Prix
76	CSK	František Šťastný	1	1962–1963; 1965–1966	1966 500cc East German Grand Prix	1966 500cc East German Grand Prix
76	UK	Godfrey Nash	1	1968–1971	1969 500cc Yugoslavian Grand Prix	1969 500cc Yugoslavian Grand Prix
76	ITA	Angelo Bergamonti	1	1967–1970	1970 500cc Spanish Grand Prix	1970 500cc Spanish Grand Prix
76	UK	Dave Simmonds†	1	1970–1972	1971 500cc Spanish Grand Prix	1971 500cc Spanish Grand Prix
76	UK	Chas Mortimer	1	1972–1976	1972 500cc Spanish Grand Prix	1972 500cc Spanish Grand Prix
76	NZL	Kim Newcombe	1	1972–1973	1973 500cc Yugoslavian Grand Prix	1973 500cc Yugoslavian Grand Prix
76	GER	Edmund Czihak	1	1974	1974 500cc German Grand Prix	1974 500cc German Grand Prix
76	ITA	Gianfranco Bonera	1	1973–1975; 1977–1978; 1980	1974 500cc Nations Grand Prix	1974 500cc Nations Grand Prix
76	UK	Phil Carpenter	1	1974	1974 500cc Isle of Man TT	1974 500cc Isle of Man TT
76	FIN	Teuvo Länsivuori	1	1974–1978	1974 500cc Swedish Grand Prix	1974 500cc Swedish Grand Prix
76	JPN	Hideo Kanaya	1	1972–1973; 1975	1975 500cc Austrian Grand Prix	1975 500cc Austrian Grand Prix
76	UK	Mick Grant	1	1970; 1972–1976; 1979; 1984	1975 500cc Isle of Man TT	1975 500cc Isle of Man TT
76	UK	Tom Herron	1	1971; 1974–1976; 1978–1979	1976 500cc Isle of Man TT	1976 500cc Isle of Man TT
76	UK	John Williams	1	1968–1978	1976 500cc Belgian Grand Prix	1976 500cc Belgian Grand Prix
76	UK	John Newbold	1	1975–1980	1976 500cc Czechoslovak Grand Prix	1976 500cc Czechoslovak Grand Prix
76	NZL	Dennis Ireland	1	1978–1979; 1983	1979 500cc Belgian Grand Prix	1979 500cc Belgian Grand Prix
76	NED	Boet van Dulmen	1	1975–1986	1979 500cc Finnish Grand Prix	1979 500cc Finnish Grand Prix
76	SUI	Michel Frutschi	1	1975–1983	1982 500cc French Grand Prix	1982 500cc French Grand Prix
76	JPN	Takazumi Katayama†	1	1976–1985	1982 500cc Swedish Grand Prix	1982 500cc Swedish Grand Prix
76	FRA	Christian Sarron†	1	1979; 1981; 1985–1990	1985 500cc German Grand Prix	1985 500cc German Grand Prix
76	AUS	Kevin Magee	1	1987–1991; 1993	1988 500cc Spanish Grand Prix	1988 500cc Spanish Grand Prix
76	ITA	Pierfrancesco Chili	1	1986–1990; 1995	1989 500cc Nations Grand Prix	1989 500cc Nations Grand Prix
76	ESP	Alberto Puig	1	1994–1997	1995 500cc Spanish Grand Prix	1995 500cc Spanish Grand Prix
76	NZL	Simon Crafar	1	1993; 1998–1999	1998 500cc British Grand Prix	1998 500cc British Grand Prix
76	FRA	Régis Laconi	1	1997–2000; 2002	1999 500cc Valencian Grand Prix	1999 500cc Valencian Grand Prix
76	JPN	Tohru Ukawa	1	2001–2005	2002 MotoGP South African Grand Prix	2002 MotoGP South African Grand Prix
76	ESP	Toni Elías†	1	2005–2009; 2011–2012; 2015	2006 MotoGP Portuguese Grand Prix	2006 MotoGP Portuguese Grand Prix
76	AUS	Troy Bayliss	1	2003–2006	2006 MotoGP Valencian Grand Prix	2006 MotoGP Valencian Grand Prix
76	AUS	Chris Vermeulen	1	2005–2009; 2012	2007 MotoGP French Grand Prix	2007 MotoGP French Grand Prix
76	USA	Ben Spies	1	2008–2013	2011 MotoGP Dutch TT	2011 MotoGP Dutch TT
76	ITA	Andrea Iannone	1	2013–2019; 2024	2016 MotoGP Austrian Grand Prix	2016 MotoGP Austrian Grand Prix
76	ESP	**Joan Mir***	1	2019–	2020 MotoGP European Grand Prix	2020 MotoGP European Grand Prix
76	ESP	**Fermín Aldeguer**	1	2025–	2025 MotoGP Indonesian Grand Prix	2025 MotoGP Indonesian Grand Prix
76	JPN	**Ai Ogura**†	1	2025–	2026 MotoGP Dutch TT	2026 MotoGP Dutch TT
76	ESP	**Pedro Acosta**†	1	2024–	2026 MotoGP Austrian Grand Prix	2026 MotoGP Austrian Grand Prix

== By nationality ==
As of the 2026 MotoGP Portuguese Grand Prix

Rank	Country	Wins	Rider(s)
1	Italy	302	27
2	Spain	223	17
3	United States	154	11
4	United Kingdom	141	26
5	Australia	128	12
6	France	16	5
7	Japan	13	7
8	Rhodesia	12	3
9	Netherlands	8	3
10	Brazil	7	1
11	Portugal	5	1
12	Ireland	4	1
13	Finland	3	2
13	Venezuela	3	1
13	New Zealand	3	3
16	Argentina	2	2
16	South Africa	2	1
18	Czechoslovakia	1	1
18	Germany	1	1
18	Switzerland	1	1

== Milestone races winners ==
=== Multiples of 100 ===
500cc/MotoGP Grands Prix by multiples of 100
Race number	Season	Grand Prix	Circuit	Winner	
Race number	Season	Grand Prix	Circuit	Rider	Constructor
100	1962	(East Germany) East German	Sachsenring	(United Kingdom) Mike Hailwood	(Italy) MV Agusta
200	1972	(Netherlands) Dutch TT	Assen	(Italy) Giacomo Agostini	(Italy) MV Agusta
300	1981	(Sweden) Swedish	Anderstorp	(United Kingdom) Barry Sheene	(Japan) Yamaha
400	1989	(France) French	Le Mans	(United States) Eddie Lawson	(Japan) Honda
500	1996	(Emilia-Romagna) Imola	Imola	(Australia) Mick Doohan	(Japan) Honda
600	2003	(France) French	Le Mans	(Spain) Sete Gibernau	(Japan) Honda
700	2009	(Japan) Japanese	Motegi	(Spain) Jorge Lorenzo	(Japan) Yamaha
800	2014	Aragon	Motorland Aragón	(Spain) Jorge Lorenzo	(Japan) Yamaha
900	2020	(Styria) Styrian	Red Bull Ring	(Portugal) Miguel Oliveira	(Austria) KTM
1000	2025	(Austria) Austrian	Red Bull Ring	(Spain) Marc Márquez	(Italy) Ducati

== Most wins per season ==
As of the 2026 MotoGP Portuguse Grand Prix

Key
	Rider has competed in the 2026 MotoGP season
**Bold**	Won the World Championship in the same year

Year	Rider(s)	Constructor(s)	Wins	Races	World Champions	Constructor(s)	Wins
1949	(United Kingdom) **Leslie Graham**	(United Kingdom) AJS	2	6			
1949	(Italy) Nello Pagani (Note: Pagani missed one race of the season.)	(Italy) Gilera	2	6			
1950	(United Kingdom) Geoff Duke	(United Kingdom) Norton	3	6	(Italy) **Umberto Masetti** (Note: Masetti missed one race of the season.)	(Italy) Gilera	2
1951	(United Kingdom) **Geoff Duke**	(United Kingdom) Norton	4	8 (Note: Duke missed one race of the season.)			
1952	(Italy) **Umberto Masetti** (Note: Masetti missed one race of the season.)	(Italy) Gilera	2	8			
1952	(United Kingdom) Leslie Graham	(Italy) MV Agusta	2	8			
1952	(Republic of Ireland) Reg Armstrong	(United Kingdom) Norton	2	8			
1953	(United Kingdom) **Geoff Duke**	(Italy) Gilera	4	8 (Note: Duke missed one race of the season.)			
1954	(United Kingdom) **Geoff Duke**	(Italy) Gilera	5	8 (Note: Duke missed one race of the season.)			
1955	(United Kingdom) **Geoff Duke**	(Italy) Gilera	4	8 (Note: Duke missed one race of the season.)			
1956	(United Kingdom) **John Surtees**	(Italy) MV Agusta	3	6 (Note: Surtees missed three races of the season.)			
1957	(Italy) **Libero Liberati**	(Italy) Gilera	4	6 (Note: Liberati missed one race of the season.)			
1958	(United Kingdom) **John Surtees**	(Italy) MV Agusta	6	7 (Note: Surtees missed one race of the season.)			
1959	(United Kingdom) **John Surtees**	(Italy) MV Agusta	7	7			
1960	(United Kingdom) **John Surtees**	(Italy) MV Agusta	5	7			
1961	(Federation of Rhodesia and Nyasaland) **Gary Hocking**	(Italy) MV Agusta	7	10 (Note: Hocking missed one race of the season.)			
1962	(United Kingdom) **Mike Hailwood**	(Italy) MV Agusta	5	8 (Note: Hailwood missed two races of the season.)			
1963	(United Kingdom) **Mike Hailwood**	(Italy) MV Agusta	7	8			
1964	(United Kingdom) **Mike Hailwood**	(Italy) MV Agusta	7	9 (Note: Hailwood missed two races of the season.)			
1965	(United Kingdom) **Mike Hailwood**	(Italy) MV Agusta	8	10 (Note: Hailwood missed two races of the season.)			
1966	(Italy) **Giacomo Agostini**	(Italy) MV Agusta	3	9			
1966	(United Kingdom) Mike Hailwood	(Japan) Honda	3	9			
1967	(Italy) **Giacomo Agostini**	(Italy) MV Agusta	5	10			
1967	(United Kingdom) Mike Hailwood	(Japan) Honda	5	10			
1968	(Italy) **Giacomo Agostini**	(Italy) MV Agusta	10	10			
1969	(Italy) **Giacomo Agostini**	(Italy) MV Agusta	10	12 (Note: Agostini missed two races of the season.)			
1970	(Italy) **Giacomo Agostini**	(Italy) MV Agusta	10	11 (Note: Agostini missed one race of the season.)			
1971	(Italy) **Giacomo Agostini**	(Italy) MV Agusta	8	11 (Note: Agostini missed two races of the season.)			
1972	(Italy) **Giacomo Agostini**	(Italy) MV Agusta	11	13 (Note: Agostini missed one race of the season.)			
1973	(United Kingdom) **Phil Read**	(Italy) MV Agusta	4	11 (Note: Read missed three races of the season.)			
1974	(United Kingdom) **Phil Read**	(Italy) MV Agusta	4	10 (Note: Read missed two races of the season.)			
1975	(Italy) **Giacomo Agostini**	(Japan) Yamaha	4	10 (Note: Agostini missed one race of the season.)			
1976	(United Kingdom) **Barry Sheene**	(Japan) Suzuki	5	10 (Note: Sheene missed four races of the season.)			
1977	(United Kingdom) **Barry Sheene**	(Japan) Suzuki	6	11 (Note: Sheene missed two races of the season.)			
1978	(United States) **Kenny Roberts**	(Japan) Yamaha	4	11			
1979	(United States) **Kenny Roberts**	(Japan) Yamaha	5	12 (Note: Roberts missed two races of the season.)			
1980	(United States) **Kenny Roberts**	(Japan) Yamaha	3	8			
1981	(Italy) **Marco Lucchinelli**	(Japan) Suzuki	5	11			
1982	(Italy) **Franco Uncini**	(Japan) Suzuki	5	12 (Note: Uncini missed one race of the season.)			
1983	(United States) **Freddie Spencer**	(Japan) Honda	6	12			
1983	(United States) Kenny Roberts	(Japan) Yamaha	6	12			
1984	(United States) Freddie Spencer	(Japan) Honda	5	12 (Note: Spencer missed five races of the season.)	(United States) **Eddie Lawson**	(Japan) Yamaha	4
1985	(United States) **Freddie Spencer**	(Japan) Honda	7	12 (Note: Spencer missed one race of the season.)			
1986	(United States) **Eddie Lawson**	(Japan) Yamaha	7	11			
1987	(Australia) **Wayne Gardner**	(Japan) Honda	7	15			
1988	(United States) **Eddie Lawson**	(Japan) Yamaha	7	15			
1989	(United States) Kevin Schwantz	(Japan) Suzuki	6	15	(United States) **Eddie Lawson**	(Japan) Honda	4
1990	(United States) **Wayne Rainey**	(Japan) Yamaha	7	15			
1991	(United States) **Wayne Rainey**	(Japan) Yamaha	6	15 (Note: Rainey missed one race of the season.)			
1992	(Australia) Mick Doohan	(Japan) Honda	5	13 (Note: Doohan missed four races of the season.)	(United States) **Wayne Rainey** (Note: Rainey missed one race of the season.)	(Japan) Yamaha	3
1993	(United States) **Kevin Schwantz**	(Japan) Suzuki	4	14			
1993	(United States) Wayne Rainey (Note: Rainey missed two races of the season.)	(Japan) Yamaha	4	14			
1994	(Australia) **Mick Doohan**	(Japan) Honda	9	14			
1995	(Australia) **Mick Doohan**	(Japan) Honda	7	13			
1996	(Australia) **Mick Doohan**	(Japan) Honda	8	15			
1997	(Australia) **Mick Doohan**	(Japan) Honda	12	15			
1998	(Australia) **Mick Doohan**	(Japan) Honda	8	14			
1999	(Spain) **Àlex Crivillé**	(Japan) Honda	6	16			
2000	(United States) **Kenny Roberts Jr.**	(Japan) Suzuki	4	16			
2001	(Italy) **Valentino Rossi**	(Japan) Honda	11	16			
2002	(Italy) **Valentino Rossi**	(Japan) Honda	11	16			
2003	(Italy) **Valentino Rossi**	(Japan) Honda	9	16			
2004	(Italy) **Valentino Rossi**	(Japan) Yamaha	9	16			
2005	(Italy) **Valentino Rossi**	(Japan) Yamaha	11	17			
2006	(Italy) Valentino Rossi	(Japan) Yamaha	5	17	(United States) **Nicky Hayden**	(Japan) Honda	2
2007	(Australia) **Casey Stoner**	(Italy) Ducati	10	18			
2008	(Italy) **Valentino Rossi**	(Japan) Yamaha	9	18			
2009	(Italy) **Valentino Rossi**	(Japan) Yamaha	6	17			
2010	(Spain) **Jorge Lorenzo**	(Japan) Yamaha	9	18			
2011	(Australia) **Casey Stoner**	(Japan) Honda	10	17			
2012	(Spain) Dani Pedrosa	(Japan) Honda	7	18	(Spain) **Jorge Lorenzo**	(Japan) Yamaha	6
2013	(Spain) Jorge Lorenzo	(Japan) Yamaha	8	18 (Note: Lorenzo missed one race of the season.)	(Spain) **Marc Márquez**	(Japan) Honda	6
2014	(Spain) **Marc Márquez**	(Japan) Honda	13	18			
2015	(Spain) **Jorge Lorenzo**	(Japan) Yamaha	7	18			
2016	(Spain) **Marc Márquez**	(Japan) Honda	5	18			
2017	(Spain) **Marc Márquez**	(Japan) Honda	6	18			
2017	(Italy) Andrea Dovizioso	(Italy) Ducati	6	18			
2018	(Spain) **Marc Márquez**	(Japan) Honda	9	18			
2019	(Spain) **Marc Márquez**	(Japan) Honda	12	19			
2020	(France) Fabio Quartararo	(Japan) Yamaha	3	14	(Spain) **Joan Mir**	(Japan) Suzuki	1
2020	(Italy) Franco Morbidelli	(Japan) Yamaha	3	14	(Spain) **Joan Mir**	(Japan) Suzuki	1
2021	(France) **Fabio Quartararo**	(Japan) Yamaha	5	18			
2022	(Italy) **Francesco Bagnaia**	(Italy) Ducati	7	20			
2023	(Italy) **Francesco Bagnaia**	(Italy) Ducati	7	20 (Note: Bagnaia missed one race of the season.)			
2024	(Italy) Francesco Bagnaia	(Italy) Ducati	11	20	(Spain) **Jorge Martín**	(Italy) Ducati	3
2025	(Spain) **Marc Márquez**	(Italy) Ducati	11	22 (Note: Márquez missed four races of the season.)			
2026	(Spain) **Marc Márquez**	(Italy) Ducati	7	20* (Note: Márquez missed two races of the season.)			
2026	(Italy) Marco Bezzecchi	(Italy) Aprilia	7	20* (Note: Bezzecchi missed two races of the season.)			

* Season still in progress.
