= List of Grand Prix motorcycle racing winners =

Grand Prix motorcycle racing is the premier championship of motorcycle road racing, which has been divided into three classes: MotoGP, Moto2, and Moto3. Former classes that have been discontinued include 350cc, 250cc, 125cc, 50cc/80cc, MotoE, and Sidecar. The premier class is MotoGP, which was formerly known as the 500cc class. The Grand Prix Road-Racing World Championship was established in 1949 by the sport's governing body the Fédération Internationale de Motocyclisme (FIM), and is the oldest motorsport world championship in existence. The motorcycles used in MotoGP are purpose-built for the sport, and are unavailable for purchase by the general public because they cannot be legally ridden on public roads. MotoE was introduced in 2019 as a "World Cup" until 2022 and thus statistics from that time span are not included here. MotoE only gained World Championship status from 2023 until 2025, because MotoE class went on hiatus after the 2025 season. This list also does not include winners from sprint races which were introduced in the MotoGP class in 2023.

Giacomo Agostini holds the record for the most Grand Prix victories, having won 122 times. Valentino Rossi is second with 115 wins, while Marc Márquez is third with 106 wins.

Rossi holds the distinction of having the longest time between his first win and his last. He won his first Grand Prix in 1996 at the 125cc Czech Republic Grand Prix, and his last in 2017 at the MotoGP Dutch TT, a gap that spans 20 years, 311 days. The youngest winner of a Grand Prix is Can Öncü, who was 15 years and 115 days old when he won – as a wildcard on his Grand Prix debut – the 2018 Moto3 Valencian Grand Prix. Arthur Wheeler is the oldest winner of a Grand Prix; he was 46 years old when he won the 1962 250cc Argentine Grand Prix. Ralf Waldmann, with 20 wins, holds the record for most race wins without becoming a World Champion.

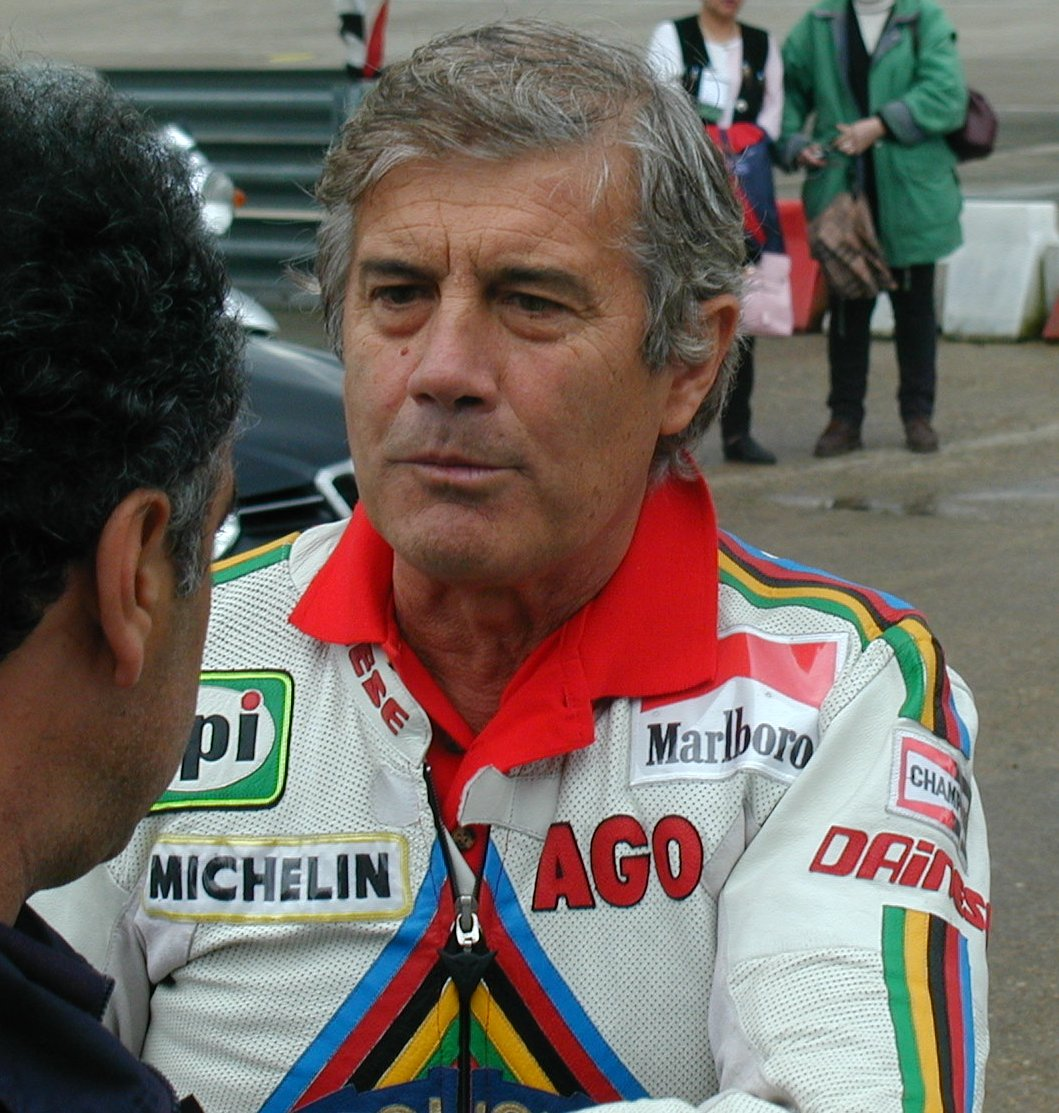
Giacomo Agostini, who won a record 122 Grands Prix during his career

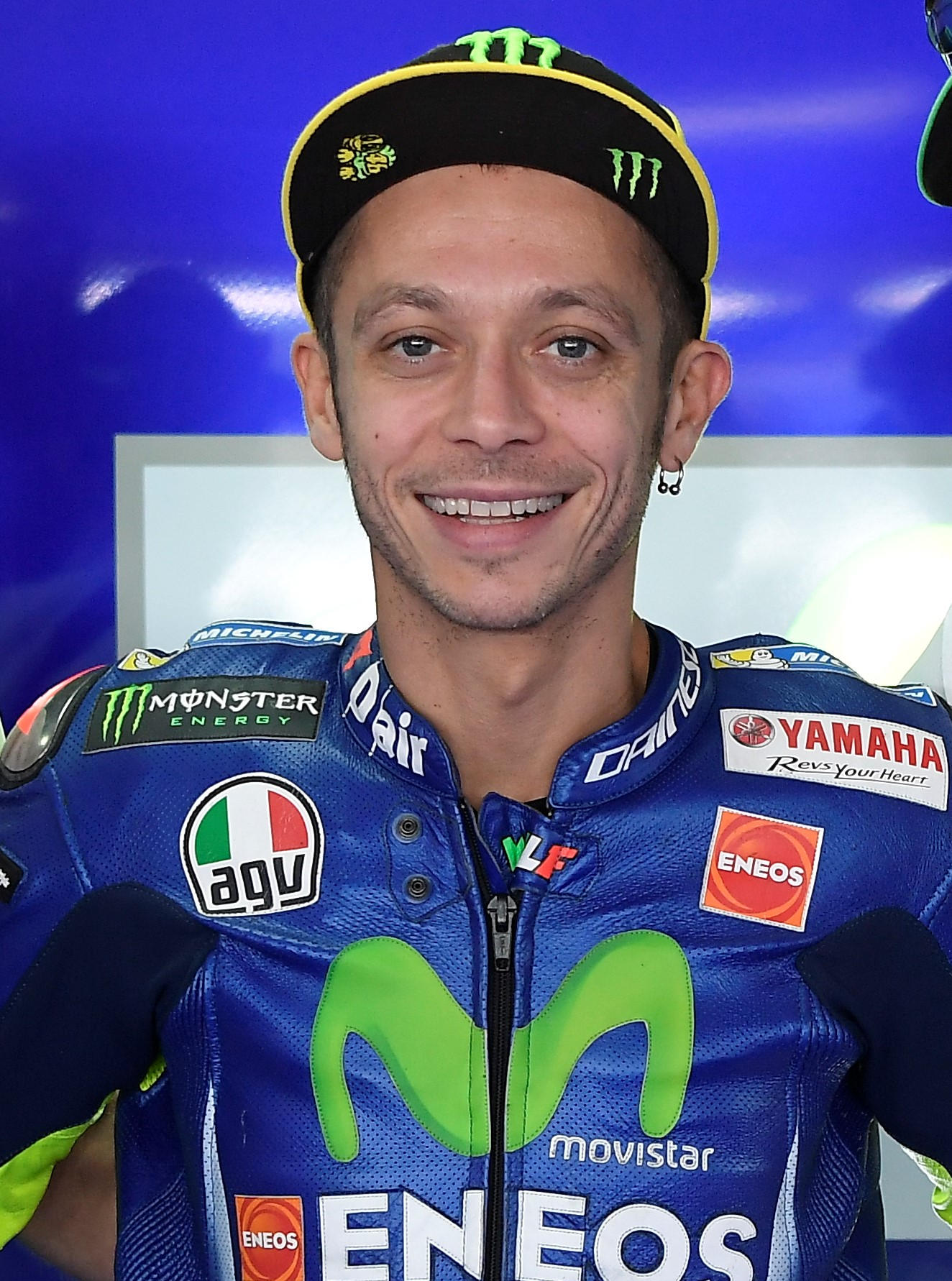
Valentino Rossi, who won a record 89 500cc/MotoGP Grands Prix during his career

== By rider ==
As of the 2026 Portuguese Grand Prix

Key
*	MotoGP/500cc World Champion
†	Grand Prix World Champion
**Bold**	Rider has competed in the 2026 season

Grand Prix motorcycle racing winners
Rank	Country	Rider	Wins	Seasons active	First win	Last win
1	ITA	Giacomo Agostini*	122	1964–1977	1965 350cc West German Grand Prix	1976 500cc West German Grand Prix
2	ITA	Valentino Rossi*	115	1996–2021	1996 125cc Czech Republic Grand Prix	2017 MotoGP Dutch TT
3	ESP	**Marc Márquez***	106	2008–	2010 125cc Italian Grand Prix	2026 MotoGP Malaysian Grand Prix
4	ESP	Ángel Nieto†	90	1964–1986	1969 50cc East German Grand Prix	1985 80cc French Grand Prix
5	UK	Mike Hailwood*	76	1958–1967	1959 125cc Ulster Grand Prix	1967 350cc Japanese Grand Prix
6	ESP	Jorge Lorenzo*	68	2002–2019	2003 125cc Rio de Janeiro Grand Prix	2018 MotoGP Austrian Grand Prix
7	AUS	Mick Doohan*	54	1989–1999	1990 500cc Hungarian Grand Prix	1998 500cc Argentine Grand Prix
7	ESP	Dani Pedrosa†	54	2001–2018; 2021; 2023–2024	2002 125cc Dutch TT	2017 MotoGP Valencian Grand Prix
9	UK	Phil Read*	52	1961–1976	1961 350cc Isle of Man TT	1975 500cc Czechoslovak Grand Prix
10	RAN	Jim Redman†	45	1959–1966	1961 250cc Belgian Grand Prix	1966 500cc Dutch TT
10	AUS	Casey Stoner*	45	2001–2012	2003 125cc Valencian Grand Prix	2012 MotoGP Australian Grand Prix
12	GER	Anton Mang†	42	1975–1988	1976 125cc West German Grand Prix	1988 250cc Japanese Grand Prix
12	ITA	Max Biaggi†	42	1991–2005	1992 250cc South African Grand Prix	2004 MotoGP German Grand Prix
14	ITA	**Francesco Bagnaia***	41	2013–	2016 Moto3 Dutch TT	2025 MotoGP Japanese Grand Prix
15	ITA	Carlo Ubbiali†	39	1949–1960	1950 125cc Ulster Grand Prix	1960 250cc Nations Grand Prix
16	UK	John Surtees*	38	1952; 1954–1960	1955 250cc Ulster Grand Prix	1960 500cc Nations Grand Prix
17	ESP	Jorge Martínez†	37	1982–1997	1984 80cc Dutch TT	1994 125cc Argentine Grand Prix
18	ITA	Luca Cadalora†	34	1984–2000	1986 125cc West German Grand Prix	1996 500cc German Grand Prix
19	UK	Geoff Duke*	33	1950–1959	1950 500cc Isle of Man TT	1958 500cc Swedish Grand Prix
20	ZAF	Kork Ballington†	31	1976–1982	1976 350cc Spanish Grand Prix	1980 250cc German Grand Prix
20	USA	Eddie Lawson*	31	1983–1992	1984 500cc South African Grand Prix	1992 500cc Hungarian Grand Prix
22	SUI	Luigi Taveri†	30	1954–1966	1955 125cc Spanish Grand Prix	1966 125cc Nations Grand Prix
23	ITA	Loris Capirossi†	29	1990–2011	1990 125cc British Grand Prix	2007 MotoGP Japanese Grand Prix
24	ITA	Eugenio Lazzarini†	27	1969–1984	1973 125cc Dutch TT	1983 125cc Belgian Grand Prix
24	USA	Freddie Spencer*	27	1980–1987; 1989; 1993	1982 500cc Belgian Grand Prix	1985 500cc Swedish Grand Prix
24	ITA	Pier Paolo Bianchi†	27	1973–1988	1976 125cc Austrian Grand Prix	1986 80cc San Marino Grand Prix
27	ESP	**Maverick Viñales**†	26	2011–	2011 125cc French Grand Prix	2024 MotoGP Grand Prix of the Americas
28	NZL	Hugh Anderson†	25	1960–1972	1962 50cc Argentine Grand Prix	1965 125cc Japanese Grand Prix
28	USA	Kevin Schwantz*	25	1986–1995	1988 500cc Japanese Grand Prix	1994 500cc British Grand Prix
30	ITA	Walter Villa†	24	1969–1980	1974 250cc Nations Grand Prix	1979 250cc Venezuelan Grand Prix
30	USA	Kenny Roberts*	24	1974; 1978–1983	1978 250cc Venezuelan Grand Prix	1983 500cc San Marino Grand Prix
30	USA	Wayne Rainey*	24	1984; 1988–1993	1988 500cc British Grand Prix	1993 500cc Czech Republic Grand Prix
30	ITA	Andrea Dovizioso†	24	2001–2022	2004 125cc South African Grand Prix	2020 MotoGP Austrian Grand Prix
34	UK	Barry Sheene*	23	1971–1984	1971 125cc Belgian Grand Prix	1981 500cc Swedish Grand Prix
35	ITA	Marco Melandri†	22	1997–2010; 2015	1998 125cc Dutch TT	2006 MotoGP Australian Grand Prix
36	UK	Bill Ivy†	21	1965–1969	1966 125cc Spanish Grand Prix	1968 125cc Nations Grand Prix
36	ITA	Fausto Gresini†	21	1983–1994	1984 125cc Swedish Grand Prix	1992 125cc British Grand Prix
36	COL	**David Alonso**†	21	2021–	2023 Moto3 British Grand Prix	2026 Moto2 Malaysian Grand Prix
39	ITA	Tarquinio Provini†	20	1954–1966	1954 125cc Spanish Grand Prix	1965 250cc Nations Grand Prix
39	ESP	Àlex Crivillé*	20	1987–2001	1989 125cc Australian Grand Prix	2000 500cc French Grand Prix
39	GER	Ralf Waldmann	20	1986–2000; 2002; 2009	1991 125cc German Grand Prix	2000 250cc British Grand Prix
42	RAN	Gary Hocking*	19	1958–1962	1959 250cc Swedish Grand Prix	1962 500cc Isle of Man TT
42	ESP	Ricardo Tormo†	19	1973–1984	1977 50cc Swedish Grand Prix	1983 50cc San Marino Grand Prix
42	VEN	Carlos Lavado†	19	1983–1992	1979 350cc Venezuelan Grand Prix	1987 250cc Yugoslavian Grand Prix
42	ESP	**Jorge Martín***	19	2015–	2017 Moto3 Valencian Grand Prix	2026 MotoGP French Grand Prix
42	ITA	**Marco Bezzecchi**	19	2015–	2018 Moto3 Argentine Grand Prix	2026 MotoGP Portuguese Grand Prix
47	SWE	Kent Andersson†	18	1966–1975	1969 250cc West German Grand Prix	1975 125cc French Grand Prix
47	SUI	Stefan Dörflinger†	18	1973–1990	1980 50cc Belgian Grand Prix	1988 80cc Spanish Grand Prix
47	AUS	Wayne Gardner*	18	1983–1992	1986 500cc Spanish Grand Prix	1992 500cc British Grand Prix
47	ESP	**Álex Rins**	18	2012–	2013 Moto3 Grand Prix of the Americas	2023 MotoGP Grand Prix of the Americas
47	FRA	**Johann Zarco**†	18	2009–	2011 125cc Japanese Grand Prix	2025 MotoGP French Grand Prix
52	JPN	Tetsuya Harada†	17	1990–2002	1993 250cc Australian Grand Prix	2001 250cc Pacific Grand Prix
52	JPN	Daijiro Kato†	17	1996–2003	1997 250cc Japanese Grand Prix	2001 250cc Rio de Janeiro Grand Prix
52	ESP	Toni Elías†	17	1999–2013; 2015	2001 125cc Dutch TT	2010 Moto2 Japanese Grand Prix
52	SUI	Thomas Lüthi†	17	2002–2021	2005 125cc French Grand Prix	2019 Moto2 Grand Prix of the Americas
52	ZAF	**Brad Binder**†	17	2011–	2016 Moto3 Spanish Grand Prix	2021 MotoGP Austrian Grand Prix
52	PRT	Miguel Oliveira	17	2011–2025	2015 Moto3 Italian Grand Prix	2022 MotoGP Thailand Grand Prix
52	ESP	**Pedro Acosta**†	17	2021–	2021 Moto3 Doha Grand Prix	2026 MotoGP Austrian Grand Prix
59	ESP	Álvaro Bautista†	16	2002–2018; 2023	2006 125cc Spanish Grand Prix	2009 250cc Catalan Grand Prix
59	ESP	Nicolás Terol†	16	2005–2014	2008 125cc Indianapolis Grand Prix	2013 Moto2 Valencian Grand Prix
59	FIN	Mika Kallio	16	2001–2020	2005 125cc Portuguese Grand Prix	2014 Moto2 Indianapolis Grand Prix
59	ESP	**Álex Márquez**†	16	2012–	2013 Moto3 Japanese Grand Prix	2026 MotoGP Spanish Grand Prix
63	GDR	Ernst Degner†	15	1957–1966	1959 125cc Nations Grand Prix	1965 125cc Ulster Grand Prix
63	FIN	Jarno Saarinen†	15	1970–1973	1971 350cc Czechoslovak Grand Prix	1973 250cc West German Grand Prix
63	ESP	Sito Pons†	15	1981–1991	1984 250cc Spanish Grand Prix	1989 250cc Swedish Grand Prix
63	ESP	**Pol Espargaró**†	15	2006–2026	2009 125cc Indianapolis Grand Prix	2013 Moto2 Japanese Grand Prix
63	ESP	**Máximo Quiles**†	15	2025–	2025 Moto3 Italian Grand Prix	2026 Moto3 Portuguese Grand Prix
68	GER	Hans-Georg Anscheidt†	14	1962–1968	1962 50cc Spanish Grand Prix	1968 50cc Belgian Grand Prix
68	NED	Jan de Vries†	14	1968–1973	1970 50cc Nations Grand Prix	1973 50cc Spanish Grand Prix
68	GER	Dieter Braun†	14	1968–1976	1969 125cc Yugoslavian Grand Prix	1976 250cc Yugoslavian Grand Prix
68	VEN	Johnny Cecotto†	14	1975–1980	1975 250cc French Grand Prix	1980 350cc Nations Grand Prix
68	GER	Dirk Raudies†	14	1989–1997	1992 125cc Brazilian Grand Prix	1995 125cc Dutch TT
68	ITA	Marco Simoncelli†	14	2002–2011	2004 125cc Spanish Grand Prix	2009 250cc Australian Grand Prix
74	USA	Randy Mamola	13	1979–1992	1980 500cc Belgian Grand Prix	1987 500cc San Marino Grand Prix
74	USA	John Kocinski†	13	1988–1999	1989 250cc Japanese Grand Prix	1994 500cc Australian Grand Prix
74	JPN	Noboru Ueda	13	1991–2002	1991 125cc Japanese Grand Prix	2001 125cc Italian Grand Prix
74	ESP	Tito Rabat†	13	2005–2021	2013 Moto2 Spanish Grand Prix	2015 Moto2 Valencian Grand Prix
74	ITA	Andrea Iannone	13	2005–2019, 2024	2008 125cc Chinese Grand Prix	2016 MotoGP Austrian Grand Prix
74	ITA	Romano Fenati	13	2012–2023	2012 Moto3 Spanish Grand Prix	2021 Moto3 British Grand Prix
74	ITA	**Enea Bastianini**†	13	2014–	2015 Moto3 San Marino Grand Prix	2024 MotoGP Emilia Romagna Grand Prix
74	ESP	**Izan Guevara**†	13	2021–	2021 Moto3 Grand Prix of the Americas	2026 Moto2 Indonesian Grand Prix
82	UK	Fergus Anderson†	12	1949–1954	1951 500cc Swiss Grand Prix	1954 350cc Spanish Grand Prix
82	SMR	Manuel Poggiali†	12	1998–2008	2001 125cc French Grand Prix	2004 250cc Rio de Janeiro Grand Prix
82	ITA	Mattia Pasini	12	2004–2020; 2022–2025	2005 125cc Chinese Grand Prix	2018 Moto2 Argentine Grand Prix
82	ESP	**Joan Mir***	12	2015–	2016 Moto3 Austrian Grand Prix	2020 MotoGP European Grand Prix
82	FRA	**Fabio Quartararo***	12	2015–	2018 Moto2 Catalan Grand Prix	2022 MotoGP German Grand Prix
82	ESP	**Raúl Fernández**	12	2016–	2020 Moto3 European Grand Prix	2026 MotoGP British Grand Prix
88	GER	Werner Haas†	11	1952–1954	1952 125cc West German Grand Prix	1954 250cc West German Grand Prix
88	UK	Dave Simmonds†	11	1966–1972	1969 125cc West German Grand Prix	1971 500cc Spanish Grand Prix
88	JPN	Takazumi Katayama†	11	1974–1985	1974 250cc Swedish Grand Prix	1982 500cc Swedish Grand Prix
88	JPN	Kazuto Sakata†	11	1991–1999	1993 125cc Spanish Grand Prix	1998 125cc British Grand Prix
88	JPN	Youichi Ui	11	1995–2007	2000 125cc Japanese Grand Prix	2001 125cc Rio de Janeiro Grand Prix
88	ITA	**Franco Morbidelli**†	11	2013–	2017 Moto2 Qatar Grand Prix	2020 MotoGP Valencian Grand Prix
88	ESP	**Arón Canet**	11	2016–	2017 Moto3 Spanish Grand Prix	2025 Moto2 Qatar Grand Prix
88	ITA	Mattia Casadei†	11	2021, 2023-2025	2023 MotoE British Grand Prix Race 2	2025 MotoE Hungarian Grand Prix Race 2
88	ESP	**José Antonio Rueda**†	11	2021–	2024 Moto3 Aragon Grand Prix	2025 Moto3 Australian Grand Prix
97	UK	Ralph Bryans†	10	1963–1967	1964 50cc Dutch TT	1967 250cc Japanese Grand Prix
97	UK	Rodney Gould†	10	1967–1972	1970 250cc French Grand Prix	1972 250cc Swedish Grand Prix
97	AUS	Gregg Hansford	10	1978–1981	1978 250cc Spanish Grand Prix	1979 350cc Finnish Grand Prix
97	JPN	Masao Azuma	10	1996–2003	1998 125cc Australian Grand Prix	2002 125cc Rio de Janeiro Grand Prix
97	ESP	Héctor Barberá	10	2002–2018	2003 125cc British Grand Prix	2009 250cc Valencian Grand Prix
97	AUS	**Jack Miller**	10	2011–	2014 Moto3 Qatar Grand Prix	2022 MotoGP Japanese Grand Prix
97	ITA	**Dennis Foggia**	10	2017–	2020 Moto3 Czech Republic Grand Prix	2022 Moto3 Thailand Grand Prix
97	UK	Sam Lowes	10	2014–2023	2015 Moto2 Grand Prix of the Americas	2023 Moto2 Spanish Grand Prix
97	ESP	Jaume Masià†	10	2017–2024	2019 Moto3 Argentine Grand Prix	2023 Moto3 Qatar Grand Prix
97	ITA	**Celestino Vietti**	10	2018–	2020 Moto3 Styrian Grand Prix	2025 Moto2 San Marino Grand Prix
97	ESP	**Manuel González**	10	2021–	2024 Moto2 Japanese Grand Prix	2026 Moto2 San Marino Grand Prix
108	UK	Bill Lomas†	9	1950–1956	1955 350cc Isle of Man TT	1956 350cc Ulster Grand Prix
108	NED	Hans Spaan	9	1980–1994	1989 125cc Austrian Grand Prix	1990 125cc Czechoslovak Grand Prix
108	ITA	Ezio Gianola	9	1983–1993	1985 125cc French Grand Prix	1992 125cc French Grand Prix
108	JPN	Haruchika Aoki†	9	1995–2002	1995 125cc Australian Grand Prix	1996 125cc Rio de Janeiro Grand Prix
108	ITA	Roberto Locatelli†	9	1994–2009	1999 125cc French Grand Prix	2004 125cc German Grand Prix
108	ESP	Sete Gibernau	9	1992–2006; 2009	2001 500cc Valencian Grand Prix	2004 MotoGP Qatar Grand Prix
108	HUN	Gábor Talmácsi†	9	2000–2010	2005 125cc Italian Grand Prix	2008 125cc Malaysian Grand Prix
108	JPN	Hiroshi Aoyama†	9	2000–2017	2005 250cc Japanese Grand Prix	2009 250cc Malaysian Grand Prix
108	ESP	Luis Salom	9	2009–2016	2012 Moto3 Indianapolis Grand Prix	2013 Moto3 Malaysian Grand Prix
108	ITA	**Tony Arbolino**	9	2017–	2019 Moto3 Italian Grand Prix	2023 Moto2 Australian Grand Prix
108	ESP	**Sergio García**	9	2019–	2019 Moto3 Valencian Grand Prix	2024 Moto2 French Grand Prix
108	ESP	**Fermín Aldeguer**	9	2021–	2023 Moto2 British Grand Prix	2025 MotoGP Indonesian Grand Prix
120	UK	Leslie Graham*	8	1949–1953	1949 500cc Swiss Grand Prix	1953 125cc Isle of Man TT
120	FIN	Teuvo Länsivuori	8	1969–1978	1971 350cc Spanish Grand Prix	1974 500cc Swedish Grand Prix
120	ITA	Paolo Pileri†	8	1973–1979	1975 125cc Spanish Grand Prix	1978 250cc Belgian Grand Prix
120	ITA	Loris Reggiani	8	1980–1995	1980 125cc British Grand Prix	1993 250cc Czech Republic Grand Prix
120	USA	Kenny Roberts Jr.*	8	1993–2007	1999 500cc Malaysian Grand Prix	2000 500cc Pacific Grand Prix
120	ESP	Julián Simón†	8	2002–2017	2005 125cc British Grand Prix	2009 125cc Valencian Grand Prix
120	ESP	Héctor Faubel	8	2000–2012	2006 125cc Turkish Grand Prix	2011 125cc German Grand Prix
120	UK	Danny Kent†	8	2010–2018	2012 Moto3 Japanese Grand Prix	2015 Moto3 British Grand Prix
120	ESP	**Daniel Holgado**	8	2021–	2023 Moto3 Portuguese Grand Prix	2026 Moto2 Qatar Grand Prix
129	ITA	Enrico Lorenzetti†	7	1949–1957	1951 250cc Nations Grand Prix	1953 250cc Spanish Grand Prix
129	IRL	Reg Armstrong	7	1949–1956	1952 500cc Isle of Man TT	1956 500cc West German Grand Prix
129	AUS	Kel Carruthers†	7	1966–1970	1969 250cc Isle of Man TT	1970 250cc Ulster Grand Prix
129	UK	Chas Mortimer	7	1969–1979	1971 125cc Isle of Man TT	1976 350cc Isle of Man TT
129	NED	Henk van Kessel†	7	1972–1986	1974 50cc French Grand Prix	1979 50cc Belgian Grand Prix
129	ZAF	Jon Ekerold†	7	1975–1983	1977 250cc French Grand Prix	1981 350cc Nations Grand Prix
129	ITA	Franco Uncini*	7	1976–1985	1977 250cc Nations Grand Prix	1982 500cc British Grand Prix
129	FRA	Christian Sarron†	7	1976–1990	1977 250cc German Grand Prix	1985 500cc German Grand Prix
129	FRA	Olivier Jacque†	7	1995–2005; 2007	1996 250cc Brazilian Grand Prix	2000 250cc Australian Grand Prix
129	FRA	Arnaud Vincent†	7	1996–2006	1999 125cc Catalan Grand Prix	2002 125cc Malaysian Grand Prix
129	ITA	Lucio Cecchinello	7	1993–1994; 1996–2003	1998 125cc Madrid Grand Prix	2003 125cc Italian Grand Prix
129	BRA	Alex Barros	7	1986–2005; 2007	1993 500cc FIM Grand Prix	2005 MotoGP Portuguese Grand Prix
129	ARG	Sebastián Porto	7	1994–2006; 2014	2002 250cc Rio de Janeiro Grand Prix	2005 250cc Dutch TT
129	GER	Stefan Bradl†	7	2005–2016; 2018–2024	2008 125cc Czech Republic Grand Prix	2011 Moto2 British Grand Prix
129	GER	Sandro Cortese†	7	2005–2017	2011 125cc Czech Republic Grand Prix	2012 Moto3 Australian Grand Prix
129	ESP	**Augusto Fernández**†	7	2017–	2019 Moto2 Dutch TT	2022 Moto2 British Grand Prix
129	UK	Jake Dixon	7	2017; 2019–2025	2023 Moto2 Dutch TT	2025 Moto2 Malaysian Grand Prix
129	JPN	**Ai Ogura**†	7	2018–	2022 Moto2 Spanish Grand Prix	2026 MotoGP Dutch TT
147	SRA	Ray Amm	6	1951–1955	1952 350cc Nations Grand Prix	1954 350cc German Grand Prix
147	ITA	Umberto Masetti*	6	1949–1958	1950 500cc Belgian Grand Prix	1955 500cc Nations Grand Prix
147	ITA	Libero Liberati*	6	1953–1959	1956 350cc Nations Grand Prix	1957 500cc Nations Grand Prix
147	AUS	Tom Phillis†	6	1959–1962	1961 125cc Spanish Grand Prix	1961 125cc Argentine Grand Prix
147	NED	Aalt Toersen	6	1967–1972	1969 50cc Spanish Grand Prix	1970 50cc Czechoslovak Grand Prix
147	ITA	Renzo Pasolini	6	1964–1973	1969 250cc Dutch TT	1972 250cc Spanish Grand Prix
147	FRA	Guy Bertin	6	1977–1988	1979 125cc Czechoslovak Grand Prix	1981 125cc Nations Grand Prix
147	ITA	Marco Lucchinelli*	6	1975–1986	1980 500cc German Grand Prix	1981 500cc Finnish Grand Prix
147	GER	Manfred Herweh	6	1980–1989	1982 350cc German Grand Prix	1984 250cc San Marino Grand Prix
147	ITA	Doriano Romboni	6	1989–1998	1990 125cc German Grand Prix	1995 250cc Brazilian Grand Prix
147	JPN	Tomomi Manako	6	1994–1999	1996 125cc Catalan Grand Prix	1998 250cc Argentine Grand Prix
147	JPN	Tadayuki Okada	6	1989–2000; 2008	1994 250cc Japanese Grand Prix	1999 500cc Australian Grand Prix
147	JPN	Shinya Nakano	6	1998–2008	1999 250cc Japanese Grand Prix	2000 250cc Valencian Grand Prix
147	ESP	Albert Arenas†	6	2014; 2016–2025	2018 Moto3 French Grand Prix	2020 Moto3 Austrian Grand Prix
147	ITA	**Luca Marini**	6	2013; 2015–	2018 Moto2 Malaysian Grand Prix	2020 Moto2 Catalan Grand Prix
147	AUS	Remy Gardner†	6	2014–2022	2020 Moto2 Portuguese Grand Prix	2021 Moto2 Algarve Grand Prix
147	ITA	Matteo Ferrari	6	2013–2015; 2023–2025	2023 MotoE French Grand Prix Race 2	2025 MotoE San Marino Grand Prix Race 2
147	ESP	**Iván Ortolá**	6	2022–	2023 Moto3 Grand Prix of the Americas	2026 Moto2 German Grand Prix
165	UK	Freddie Frith†	5	1949–1950	1949 350cc Isle of Man TT	1949 350cc Ulster Grand Prix
165	ITA	Dario Ambrosini†	5	1949–1951	1949 250cc Nations Grand Prix	1951 250cc Swiss Grand Prix
165	AUT	Rupert Hollaus†	5	1953–1954	1954 125cc Isle of Man TT	1954 250cc Swiss Grand Prix
165	AUS	Ken Kavanagh	5	1951–1956; 1959	1952 350cc Ulster Grand Prix	1956 350cc Isle of Man TT
165	UK	Cecil Sandford†	5	1950–1957	1952 125cc Isle of Man TT	1957 250cc Ulster Grand Prix
165	UK	Bob McIntyre	5	1953–1962	1957 350cc Isle of Man TT	1962 250cc Belgian Grand Prix
165	UK	John Hartle	5	1955–1961; 1963–1964; 1967–1968	1956 500cc Ulster Grand Prix	1963 500cc Dutch TT
165	NED	Wil Hartog	5	1973–1981	1977 500cc Dutch TT	1980 500cc Finnish Grand Prix
165	FRA	Jean-François Baldé	5	1973–1989	1981 250cc Argentine Grand Prix	1983 250cc South African Grand Prix
165	SUI	Bruno Kneubühler	5	1972–1989	1972 350cc Spanish Grand Prix	1983 125cc Swedish Grand Prix
165	AUT	August Auinger	5	1978–1989	1985 125cc German Grand Prix	1986 125cc San Marino Grand Prix
165	ESP	Carlos Cardús	5	1983–1993	1989 250cc French Grand Prix	1990 250cc Czechoslovak Grand Prix
165	GER	Helmut Bradl	5	1986–1993	1991 250cc Spanish Grand Prix	1991 250cc Vitesse du Mans Grand Prix
165	ITA	Pierfrancesco Chili	5	1984–1995	1989 500cc Nations Grand Prix	1992 250cc British Grand Prix
165	JPN	Takeshi Tsujimura	5	1993–1998	1993 125cc Austrian Grand Prix	1994 125cc United States Grand Prix
165	GER	Peter Öttl	5	1987–1997	1989 80cc German Grand Prix	1996 125cc Italian Grand Prix
165	JPN	Masaki Tokudome	5	1994–2005	1995 125cc Rio de Janeiro Grand Prix	1996 125cc Imola Grand Prix
165	AUS	Garry McCoy	5	1992–2004; 2006	1995 125cc Malaysian Grand Prix	2000 500cc Valencian Grand Prix
165	JPN	Tohru Ukawa	5	1994–2005	1999 250cc French Grand Prix	2002 MotoGP South African Grand Prix
165	ESP	Fonsi Nieto	5	1997–2004; 2007; 2010	2002 250cc Spanish Grand Prix	2003 250cc British Grand Prix
165	ITA	Stefano Perugini	5	1993–2004	1996 125cc Malaysian Grand Prix	2003 125cc German Grand Prix
165	FRA	Randy de Puniet	5	1998–2014	2003 250cc Catalan Grand Prix	2005 250cc British Grand Prix
165	FRA	Mike Di Meglio†	5	2003–2015	2005 125cc Turkish Grand Prix	2008 125cc Australian Grand Prix
165	ITA	Simone Corsi	5	2002–2022, 2024	2007 125cc Turkish Grand Prix	2008 125cc Valencian Grand Prix
165	GER	**Jonas Folger**	5	2008–2017; 2019; 2023; 2026	2011 125cc British Grand Prix	2016 Moto2 Czech Republic Grand Prix
165	ITA	Lorenzo Baldassarri	5	2013–2021; 2023; 2025	2016 Moto2 San Marino Grand Prix	2019 Moto2 Spanish Grand Prix
165	ITA	Lorenzo Dalla Porta†	5	2015–2023	2018 Moto3 San Marino Grand Prix	2019 Moto3 Malaysian Grand Prix
165	ESP	Héctor Garzó†	5	2017–2018; 2020–2021; 2023–2025	2023 MotoE German Grand Prix Race 2	2024 MotoE Austrian Grand Prix Race 2
165	TUR	**Deniz Öncü**	5	2019–	2023 Moto3 German Grand Prix	2025 Moto2 German Grand Prix
165	ESP	**Ángel Piqueras**	5	2024–	2024 Moto3 San Marino Grand Prix	2025 Moto3 Catalan Grand Prix
165	ESP	Oscar Gutiérrez	5	2023–2025	2024 MotoE Catalan Grand Prix Race 1	2025 MotoE Portuguese Grand Prix Race 2
165	BRA	**Diogo Moreira**†	5	2022–	2023 Moto3 Indonesian Grand Prix	2025 Moto2 Portuguese Grand Prix
165	ITA	**Fabio Di Giannantonio**	5	2015–	2018 Moto3 Czech Republic Grand Prix	2026 MotoGP Catalan Grand Prix
198	ITA	Nello Pagani†	4	1949–1955	1949 125cc Swiss Grand Prix	1949 500cc Nations Grand Prix
198	ITA	Bruno Ruffo†	4	1949–1952	1949 250cc Swiss Grand Prix	1951 250cc Ulster Grand Prix
198	JPN	Kunimitsu Takahashi	4	1960–1964	1961 250cc West German Grand Prix	1962 125cc French Grand Prix
198	CSK	František Šťastný	4	1957–1969	1961 350cc West German Grand Prix	1966 500cc East German Grand Prix
198	JPN	Yoshimi Katayama	4	1964–1967	1966 50cc Japanese Grand Prix	1967 50cc Dutch TT
198	NED	Paul Lodewijkx	4	1967–1969	1968 50cc Dutch TT	1969 50cc Yugoslavian Grand Prix
198	ESP	Santiago Herrero	4	1968–1970	1969 250cc Spanish Grand Prix	1970 250cc Yugoslavian Grand Prix
198	ITA	Gilberto Parlotti	4	1969–1972	1970 125cc Czechoslovak Grand Prix	1972 125cc French Grand Prix
198	HUN	János Drapál	4	1969–1981	1971 250cc Czechoslovak Grand Prix	1973 350cc Yugoslavian Grand Prix
198	SWE	Börje Jansson	4	1969–1973	1972 250cc Austrian Grand Prix	1973 125cc Swedish Grand Prix
198	AUS	John Dodds	4	1966–1978	1970 125cc West German Grand Prix	1974 250cc Spanish Grand Prix
198	GER	Herbert Rittberger	4	1973–1977	1974 50cc Dutch TT	1977 50cc German Grand Prix
198	AUS	Barry Smith	4	1965–1969; 1979–1981	1968 50cc Isle of Man TT	1979 125cc Belgian Grand Prix
198	BEL	Didier de Radiguès	4	1980–1991	1982 350cc Nations Grand Prix	1983 250cc Belgian Grand Prix
198	GER	Gerhard Waibel	4	1979–1989	1979 50cc German Grand Prix	1987 80cc German Grand Prix
198	FRA	Dominique Sarron	4	1985–1992	1986 250cc British Grand Prix	1988 250cc Brazilian Grand Prix
198	ESP	Emilio Alzamora†	4	1994–2003	1995 125cc Argentine Grand Prix	2000 125cc Portuguese Grand Prix
198	ITA	Roberto Rolfo	4	1996; 1998–2005; 2010; 2012; 2014	2003 250cc German Grand Prix	2010 Moto2 Malaysian Grand Prix
198	SMR	Alex de Angelis	4	1999–2015; 2017	2006 250cc Valencian Grand Prix	2012 Moto2 Malaysian Grand Prix
198	UK	Scott Redding	4	2008–2018	2008 125cc British Grand Prix	2013 Moto2 British Grand Prix
198	ITA	Niccolò Antonelli	4	2012–2022	2015 Moto3 Czech Republic Grand Prix	2019 Moto3 Spanish Grand Prix
198	UK	John McPhee	4	2010–2022	2016 Moto3 Czech Republic Grand Prix	2022 Moto3 Malaysian Grand Prix
198	ITA	Nicholas Spinelli	4	2023–2025	2023 MotoE San Marino Grand Prix Race 2	2024 MotoE French Grand Prix Race 2
198	ITA	Alessandro Zaccone†	4	2022–2025	2024 MotoE Dutch TT Race 2	2025 MotoE Portuguese Grand Prix Race 1
198	AUS	**Senna Agius**	4	2022–	2025 Moto2 British Grand Prix	2026 Moto2 Spanish Grand Prix
198	ESP	**Alonso López**	4	2018–	2022 Moto2 San Marino Grand Prix	2026 Moto2 Aragon Grand Prix
198	ESP	**David Almansa**	4	2022–	2026 Moto3 Thailand Grand Prix	2026 Moto3 Qatar Grand Prix
225	UK	Bob Foster†	3	1949–1951	1950 350cc Belgian Grand Prix	1950 350cc Ulster Grand Prix
225	ITA	Gianni Leoni	3	1949–1951	1949 125cc Nations Grand Prix	1951 125cc Dutch TT
225	UK	Maurice Cann	3	1949–1952	1949 250cc Ulster Grand Prix	1952 250cc Ulster Grand Prix
225	ITA	Alfredo Milani	3	1950–1957	1951 500cc French Grand Prix	1953 500cc Belgian Grand Prix
225	AUS	Keith Campbell†	3	1950–1958	1957 350cc Dutch TT	1957 350cc Ulster Grand Prix
225	ITA	Emilio Mendogni	3	1951–1953; 1958–1960	1952 125cc Nations Grand Prix	1958 250cc Nations Grand Prix
225	UK	Frank Perris	3	1960–1971	1963 125cc Japanese Grand Prix	1965 125cc Czechoslovak Grand Prix
225	CAN	Michael Duff	3	1961–1967	1964 250cc Belgian Grand Prix	1965 250cc Finnish Grand Prix
225	ITA	Silvio Grassetti	3	1961–1963; 1965–1973	1969 350cc Yugoslavian Grand Prix	1971 250cc Belgian Grand Prix
225	ITA	Alberto Pagani	3	1959–1972	1969 500cc Nations Grand Prix	1972 500cc Yugoslavian Grand Prix
225	UK	Tommy Robb	3	1957–1959; 1961–1973	1962 250cc Ulster Grand Prix	1973 125cc Isle of Man TT
225	JPN	Hideo Kanaya	3	1967; 1972–1973; 1975	1972 250cc West German Grand Prix	1975 500cc Austrian Grand Prix
225	UK	Charlie Williams	3	1972–1976; 1980–1981	1973 250cc Isle of Man TT	1975 350cc Isle of Man TT
225	ITA	Otello Buscherini	3	1970–1976	1973 125cc Czechoslovak Grand Prix	1975 350cc Czechoslovak Grand Prix
225	BEL	Julien Vanzeebroeck	3	1974–1978	1974 50cc Finnish Grand Prix	1976 50cc Finnish Grand Prix
225	AUS	Jack Findlay	3	1958–1978	1971 500cc Ulster Grand Prix	1977 500cc Austrian Grand Prix
225	FRA	Michel Rougerie	3	1972–1981	1975 250cc Finnish Grand Prix	1977 350cc Spanish Grand Prix
225	UK	Mick Grant	3	1971–1984	1975 500cc Isle of Man TT	1977 250cc Swedish Grand Prix
225	USA	Pat Hennen	3	1976–1978	1976 500cc Finnish Grand Prix	1978 500cc Spanish Grand Prix
225	ITA	Graziano Rossi	3	1977–1982	1979 250cc Yugoslavian Grand Prix	1979 250cc Swedish Grand Prix
225	NED	Theo Timmer	3	1972–1987	1972 50cc Grand Prix of the DRG	1981 50cc Czechoslovak Grand Prix
225	FRA	Patrick Fernandez	3	1975–1985	1979 350cc French Grand Prix	1984 250cc South African Grand Prix
225	GER	Martin Wimmer	3	1980–1991	1982 250cc British Grand Prix	1987 250cc Spanish Grand Prix
225	ESP	Joan Garriga	3	1984–1993	1988 250cc Expo 92 Grand Prix	1988 250cc Czechoslovak Grand Prix
225	SUI	Jacques Cornu	3	1980–1990	1988 250cc Austrian Grand Prix	1989 250cc Belgian Grand Prix
225	GER	Reinhold Roth	3	1979–1990	1987 250cc French Grand Prix	1989 250cc Czechoslovak Grand Prix
225	ITA	Alessandro Gramigni†	3	1990–1997	1991 125cc Czechoslovak Grand Prix	1992 125cc Hungarian Grand Prix
225	FRA	Jean-Philippe Ruggia	3	1987–1998	1993 250cc British Grand Prix	1994 250cc Spanish Grand Prix
225	AUS	Daryl Beattie	3	1989–1997	1993 500cc German Grand Prix	1995 500cc German Grand Prix
225	JPN	Norifumi Abe	3	1994–2004	1996 500cc Japanese Grand Prix	2000 500cc Japanese Grand Prix
225	ITA	Simone Sanna	3	1997–2004	2000 125cc Catalan Grand Prix	2001 125cc German Grand Prix
225	USA	Nicky Hayden*	3	2003–2016	2005 MotoGP United States Grand Prix	2006 MotoGP United States Grand Prix
225	ESP	Sergio Gadea	3	2003–2011; 2013	2007 125cc French Grand Prix	2009 125cc Dutch TT
225	JPN	Yuki Takahashi	3	2001–2015	2006 250cc French Grand Prix	2010 Moto2 Catalan Grand Prix
225	UK	Bradley Smith	3	2006–2020	2009 125cc Spanish Grand Prix	2010 125cc Valencian Grand Prix
225	UK	**Cal Crutchlow**	3	2011–2023; 2026	2016 MotoGP Czech Republic Grand Prix	2018 MotoGP Argentine Grand Prix
225	JPN	Tatsuki Suzuki	3	2015–2024	2019 Moto3 San Marino Grand Prix	2023 Moto3 Argentine Grand Prix
225	ESP	Jordi Torres	3	2010–2014; 2018; 2023–2025	2013 Moto2 German Grand Prix	2023 MotoE German Grand Prix Race 1
225	ESP	**Aleix Espargaró**	3	2004–2026	2022 MotoGP Argentine Grand Prix	2023 MotoGP Catalan Grand Prix
225	JPN	**Ayumu Sasaki**	3	2016–	2022 Moto3 Dutch TT	2023 Moto3 Valencian Grand Prix
225	ITA	Andrea Mantovani	3	2023–2025	2023 MotoE Italian Grand Prix Race 1	2025 MotoE Dutch TT Race 1
225	USA	**Joe Roberts**	3	2017–	2022 Moto2 Portuguese Grand Prix	2025 Moto2 Czech Republic Grand Prix
225	BRA	Eric Granado	3	2012–2014; 2017–2018; 2023–2025	2023 MotoE Italian Grand Prix Race 2	2025 MotoE Catalan Grand Prix Race 2
225	ESP	**David Muñoz**	3	2022–	2025 Moto3 Aragon Grand Prix	2025 Moto3 Japanese Grand Prix
269	UK	Tommy Wood	2	1949–1954	1951 350cc Spanish Grand Prix	1951 250cc Isle of Man TT
269	UK	Bill Doran	2	1949; 1951–1953	1949 500cc Belgian Grand Prix	1951 350cc Dutch TT
269	UK	Cromie McCandless	2	1949–1952	1951 125cc Isle of Man TT	1952 500cc Ulster Grand Prix
269	FRA	Pierre Monneret	2	1953–1956	1954 350cc French Grand Prix	1954 500cc French Grand Prix
269	UK	Dickie Dale	2	1949–1950; 1953–1960	1954 500cc Spanish Grand Prix	1955 350cc Nations Grand Prix
269	ITA	Alberto Gandossi	2	1958; 1960	1958 125cc Belgian Grand Prix	1958 125cc Swedish Grand Prix
269	NED	Jan Huberts	2	1960–1962; 1968–1969; 1971–1975; 1977; 1979	1962 50cc French Grand Prix	1962 50cc East German Grand Prix
269	UK	Arthur Wheeler	2	1951–1962	1954 250cc Nations Grand Prix	1962 250cc Argentine Grand Prix
269	UK	Alan Shepherd	2	1959–1964	1962 500cc Finnish Grand Prix	1964 250cc United States Grand Prix
269	UK	Stuart Graham	2	1962; 1966–1967	1967 50cc Isle of Man TT	1967 125cc Finnish Grand Prix
269	JPN	Mitsuo Itoh	2	1962–1967	1963 50cc Isle of Man TT	1967 50cc Japanese Grand Prix
269	ESP	Salvador Cañellas	2	1968–1970	1968 125cc Spanish Grand Prix	1970 50cc Spanish Grand Prix
269	ITA	Angelo Bergamonti	2	1967–1970	1970 350cc Spanish Grand Prix	1970 500cc Spanish Grand Prix
269	GER	Helmut Kassner	2	1974	1974 250cc German Grand Prix	1974 350cc German Grand Prix
269	UK	Tony Rutter	2	1969–1976	1973 350cc Isle of Man TT	1974 350cc Isle of Man TT
269	UK	Tom Herron	2	1971–1979	1976 250cc Isle of Man TT	1976 500cc Isle of Man TT
269	ITA	Gianfranco Bonera	2	1973–1980	1974 500cc Nations Grand Prix	1976 250cc Spanish Grand Prix
269	ITA	Virginio Ferrari	2	1976–1989	1978 500cc German Grand Prix	1979 500cc Dutch TT
269	NED	Jack Middelburg	2	1977–1983	1980 500cc Dutch TT	1981 500cc British Grand Prix
269	FRA	Éric Saul	2	1977–1986	1981 250cc Nations Grand Prix	1982 350cc Austrian Grand Prix
269	VEN	Iván Palazzese	2	1977–1989	1982 125cc Swedish Grand Prix	1982 125cc Finnish Grand Prix
269	ITA	Maurizio Vitali	2	1981–1993	1983 125cc San Marino Grand Prix	1984 125cc San Marino Grand Prix
269	ESP	Manuel Herreros†	2	1984–1991	1986 50cc German Grand Prix	1987 80cc San Marino Grand Prix
269	ESP	Herri Torrontegui	2	1985–1996	1989 80cc Spanish Grand Prix	1989 80cc Czechoslovak Grand Prix
269	ESP	Carlos Checa	2	1993–2007; 2010	1996 500cc Catalan Grand Prix	1998 500cc Madrid Grand Prix
269	ITA	Gianluigi Scalvini	2	1993–2002	1999 125cc Valencian Grand Prix	1999 125cc South African Grand Prix
269	JPN	Makoto Tamada	2	1998–2007	2004 MotoGP Rio de Janeiro Grand Prix	2004 MotoGP Japanese Grand Prix
269	CZE	Lukáš Pešek	2	2002–2010; 2013	2007 125cc Chinese Grand Prix	2007 125cc Australian Grand Prix
269	ESP	Alex Debón	2	1996–2010	2008 250cc French Grand Prix	2008 250cc Czech Republic Grand Prix
269	AUS	Anthony West	2	1998–2001; 2003–2008; 2010–2016	2003 250cc Dutch TT	2014 Moto2 Dutch TT
269	ESP	Efrén Vázquez	2	2007–2016	2014 Moto3 Indianapolis Grand Prix	2014 Moto3 Malaysian Grand Prix
269	FRA	Alexis Masbou	2	2003–2016	2014 Moto3 Czech Republic Grand Prix	2015 Moto3 Qatar Grand Prix
269	MYS	Khairul Idham Pawi	2	2015–2020	2016 Moto3 Argentine Grand Prix	2016 Moto3 German Grand Prix
269	ESP	**Jorge Navarro**	2	2012–2022; 2024–	2016 Moto3 Catalan Grand Prix	2016 Moto3 Aragon Grand Prix
269	JPN	**Takaaki Nakagami**	2	2007–2009; 2011–2026	2016 Moto2 Dutch TT	2017 Moto2 British Grand Prix
269	ESP	**Marcos Ramírez**	2	2014; 2016–	2019 Moto3 Catalan Grand Prix	2019 Moto3 British Grand Prix
269	ITA	Danilo Petrucci	2	2012–2023	2019 MotoGP Italian Grand Prix	2020 MotoGP French Grand Prix
269	ITA	Andrea Migno	2	2013–2024	2017 Moto3 Italian Grand Prix	2022 Moto3 Qatar Grand Prix
269	THA	**Somkiat Chantra**	2	2018–2026	2022 Moto2 Indonesian Grand Prix	2023 Moto2 Japanese Grand Prix
269	NED	**Collin Veijer**	2	2023–	2023 Moto3 Malaysian Grand Prix	2024 Moto3 Spanish Grand Prix
269	ITA	Kevin Zannoni	2	2017–2019; 2021–2025	2024 MotoE Catalan Grand Prix Race 2	2024 MotoE Italian Grand Prix Race 2
269	ESP	**Brian Uriarte**	2	2025–	2026 Moto3 Italian Grand Prix	2026 Moto3 German Grand Prix
311	IRL	Manliffe Barrington	1	1949–1951	1949 250cc Isle of Man TT	1949 250cc Isle of Man TT
311	UK	Harold Daniell	1	1949–1950	1949 500cc Isle of Man TT	1949 500cc Isle of Man TT
311	UK	Artie Bell	1	1949–1950	1950 350cc Isle of Man TT	1950 350cc Isle of Man TT
311	ITA	Guido Leoni	1	1949–1951	1951 125cc Spanish Grand Prix	1951 125cc Spanish Grand Prix
311	UK	Jack Brett	1	1949–1960	1952 500cc Swiss Grand Prix	1952 500cc Swiss Grand Prix
311	GER	Rudi Felgenheier	1	1952	1952 250cc West German Grand Prix	1952 250cc West German Grand Prix
311	NZL	Ken Mudford	1	1951–1953	1953 350cc Ulster Grand Prix	1953 350cc Ulster Grand Prix
311	ITA	Angelo Copeta	1	1952–1955	1953 125cc Spanish Grand Prix	1953 125cc Spanish Grand Prix
311	NZL	Rod Coleman	1	1951–1956	1954 350cc Isle of Man TT	1954 350cc Isle of Man TT
311	ITA	Guido Sala	1	1952; 1954; 1957	1954 125cc Nations Grand Prix	1954 125cc Nations Grand Prix
311	ITA	Duilio Agostini	1	1953–1955	1955 350cc French Grand Prix	1955 350cc French Grand Prix
311	GER	Hermann Paul Müller†	1	1952–1955	1955 250cc German Grand Prix	1955 250cc German Grand Prix
311	ITA	Giuseppe Colnago	1	1952–1953; 1955; 1957	1955 500cc Belgian Grand Prix	1955 500cc Belgian Grand Prix
311	ITA	Romolo Ferri	1	1951–1952; 1954–1956; 1958	1956 125cc German Grand Prix	1956 125cc German Grand Prix
311	GER	Horst Fügner	1	1957–1959	1958 250cc Swedish Grand Prix	1958 250cc Swedish Grand Prix
311	ITA	Bruno Spaggiari	1	1958–1960; 1965; 1968–1969; 1971–1972	1958 125cc Nations Grand Prix	1958 125cc Nations Grand Prix
311	ITA	Remo Venturi	1	1955–1960; 1962–1965	1960 500cc Dutch TT	1960 500cc Dutch TT
311	ARG	Jorge Kissling	1	1961–1963	1961 500cc Argentine Grand Prix	1961 500cc Argentine Grand Prix
311	UK	Derek Minter	1	1957–1967	1962 250cc Isle of Man TT	1962 250cc Isle of Man TT
311	JPN	Teisuke Tanaka	1	1960–1962; 1964	1962 125cc Nations Grand Prix	1962 125cc Nations Grand Prix
311	ARG	Benedicto Caldarella	1	1961–1964	1962 500cc Argentine Grand Prix	1962 500cc Argentine Grand Prix
311	JPN	Isao Morishita	1	1962–1964; 1966–1967	1963 50cc Belgian Grand Prix	1963 50cc Belgian Grand Prix
311	AUT	Bert Schneider	1	1961–1964	1963 125cc Belgian Grand Prix	1963 125cc Belgian Grand Prix
311	JPN	Fumio Ito	1	1960–1961; 1963	1963 250cc Belgian Grand Prix	1963 250cc Belgian Grand Prix
311	AUS	Jack Ahearn	1	1954–1955; 1958; 1962–1966; 1974	1964 500cc Finnish Grand Prix	1964 500cc Finnish Grand Prix
311	UK	Dick Creith	1	1964–1965	1965 500cc Ulster Grand Prix	1965 500cc Ulster Grand Prix
311	NZL	Ginger Molloy	1	1965–1970	1966 250cc Ulster Grand Prix	1966 250cc Ulster Grand Prix
311	JPN	Hiroshi Hasegawa	1	1963–1966	1966 250cc Japanese Grand Prix	1966 250cc Japanese Grand Prix
311	NED	Cees van Dongen	1	1964; 1966–1979; 1981	1969 125cc Spanish Grand Prix	1969 125cc Spanish Grand Prix
311	FRA	Jean Auréal	1	1969	1969 125cc French Grand Prix	1969 125cc French Grand Prix
311	UK	Godfrey Nash	1	1968–1971	1969 500cc Yugoslavian Grand Prix	1969 500cc Yugoslavian Grand Prix
311	UK	Tony Jefferies	1	1970–1971	1971 350cc Isle of Man TT	1971 350cc Isle of Man TT
311	UK	Ray McCullough	1	1969–1973	1971 250cc Ulster Grand Prix	1971 250cc Ulster Grand Prix
311	UK	Peter Williams	1	1966–1971	1971 350cc Ulster Grand Prix	1971 350cc Ulster Grand Prix
311	SUI	Gyula Marsovszky	1	1963–1971	1971 250cc Nations Grand Prix	1971 250cc Nations Grand Prix
311	NED	Jan Bruins	1	1970–1975	1972 50cc Yugoslavian Grand Prix	1972 50cc Yugoslavian Grand Prix
311	NZL	Kim Newcombe	1	1972–1973	1973 500cc Yugoslavian Grand Prix	1973 500cc Yugoslavian Grand Prix
311	NED	Jos Schurgers	1	1968–1975	1973 125cc Belgian Grand Prix	1973 125cc Belgian Grand Prix
311	BRA	Adu Celso	1	1972–1975	1973 350cc Spanish Grand Prix	1973 350cc Spanish Grand Prix
311	GER	Ingo Emmerich	1	1974–1980	1974 50cc German Grand Prix	1974 50cc German Grand Prix
311	GER	Fritz Reitmaier	1	1974	1974 125cc German Grand Prix	1974 125cc German Grand Prix
311	GER	Edmund Czihak	1	1974	1974 500cc German Grand Prix	1974 500cc German Grand Prix
311	UK	Phil Carpenter	1	1974	1974 500cc Isle of Man TT	1974 500cc Isle of Man TT
311	GER	Gerhard Thurow	1	1969–1975	1974 50cc Belgian Grand Prix	1974 50cc Belgian Grand Prix
311	ESP	Benjamin Grau	1	1967–1975	1974 125cc Spanish Grand Prix	1974 125cc Spanish Grand Prix
311	ESP	Víctor Palomo	1	1972–1977	1974 350cc Spanish Grand Prix	1974 350cc Spanish Grand Prix
311	SWE	Leif Gustafsson	1	1973–1976; 1978	1975 125cc Czechoslovak Grand Prix	1975 125cc Czechoslovak Grand Prix
311	FIN	Pentti Korhonen	1	1969–1970; 1972–1979	1975 350cc Yugoslavian Grand Prix	1975 350cc Yugoslavian Grand Prix
311	SUI	Ulrich Graf	1	1970–1977	1976 50cc Yugoslavian Grand Prix	1976 50cc Yugoslavian Grand Prix
311	FRA	Olivier Chevallier	1	1972–1979	1976 350cc Yugoslavian Grand Prix	1976 350cc Yugoslavian Grand Prix
311	UK	John Williams	1	1968–1978	1976 500cc Belgian Grand Prix	1976 500cc Belgian Grand Prix
311	UK	John Newbold	1	1974–1980	1976 500cc Czechoslovak Grand Prix	1976 500cc Czechoslovak Grand Prix
311	ZAF	Alan North	1	1975–1977; 1979–1983	1977 350cc Nations Grand Prix	1977 350cc Nations Grand Prix
311	ITA	Mario Lega†	1	1973–1978	1977 250cc Yugoslavian Grand Prix	1977 250cc Yugoslavian Grand Prix
311	ITA	Pierluigi Conforti	1	1975–1982	1977 125cc British Grand Prix	1977 125cc British Grand Prix
311	AUT	Edi Stöllinger	1	1977–1981	1979 250cc Belgian Grand Prix	1979 250cc Belgian Grand Prix
311	NZL	Dennis Ireland	1	1978–1979, 1983	1979 500cc Belgian Grand Prix	1979 500cc Belgian Grand Prix
311	NED	Boet van Dulmen	1	1974–1986	1979 500cc Finnish Grand Prix	1979 500cc Finnish Grand Prix
311	FRA	Jean-Claude Selini	1	1980–1990	1982 125cc French Grand Prix	1982 125cc French Grand Prix
311	FRA	Jean-Louis Tournadre†	1	1980–1986	1982 250cc French Grand Prix	1982 250cc French Grand Prix
311	SUI	Michel Frutschi	1	1977–1983	1982 500cc French Grand Prix	1982 500cc French Grand Prix
311	SUI	Roland Freymond	1	1977–1986	1982 250cc Swedish Grand Prix	1982 250cc Swedish Grand Prix
311	UK	Alan Carter	1	1983–1990	1983 250cc French Grand Prix	1983 250cc French Grand Prix
311	FRA	Hervé Guilleux	1	1979–1987	1983 250cc Spanish Grand Prix	1983 250cc Spanish Grand Prix
311	FRA	Jacques Bolle	1	1979–1984	1983 250cc British Grand Prix	1983 250cc British Grand Prix
311	ITA	Fausto Ricci	1	1984–1994	1984 250cc Nations Grand Prix	1984 250cc Nations Grand Prix
311	AUT	Gerd Kafka	1	1984–1986	1985 80cc Dutch TT	1985 80cc Dutch TT
311	ITA	Domenico Brigaglia	1	1982–1990	1986 125cc Belgian Grand Prix	1986 125cc Belgian Grand Prix
311	UK	Ian McConnachie	1	1985–1991	1986 80cc British Grand Prix	1986 80cc British Grand Prix
311	JPN	Tadahiko Taira	1	1984–1991	1986 250cc San Marino Grand Prix	1986 250cc San Marino Grand Prix
311	JPN	Masaru Kobayashi	1	1987–1989	1987 250cc Japanese Grand Prix	1987 250cc Japanese Grand Prix
311	ITA	Paolo Casoli	1	1984; 1986–1993	1987 125cc Portuguese Grand Prix	1987 125cc Portuguese Grand Prix
311	USA	Jim Filice	1	1988–1989; 1991; 1993–1995	1988 250cc United States Grand Prix	1988 250cc United States Grand Prix
311	AUS	Kevin Magee	1	1987–1991; 1993	1988 500cc Spanish Grand Prix	1988 500cc Spanish Grand Prix
311	NED	Wilco Zeelenberg	1	1985–1995	1990 250cc German Grand Prix	1990 250cc German Grand Prix
311	GER	Stefan Prein	1	1985–1995	1990 125cc Yugoslavian Grand Prix	1990 125cc Yugoslavian Grand Prix
311	ITA	Bruno Casanova	1	1986–1994	1992 125cc German Grand Prix	1992 125cc German Grand Prix
311	JPN	Nobuatsu Aoki	1	1990–2007	1993 250cc Malaysian Grand Prix	1993 250cc Malaysian Grand Prix
311	ESP	Alberto Puig	1	1987–1997	1995 500cc Spanish Grand Prix	1995 500cc Spanish Grand Prix
311	ITA	Ivan Goi	1	1996–2002	1996 125cc Austrian Grand Prix	1996 125cc Austrian Grand Prix
311	ITA	Marcellino Lucchi	1	1982–2004	1998 250cc Italian Grand Prix	1998 250cc Italian Grand Prix
311	NZL	Simon Crafar	1	1993; 1998–1999	1998 500cc British Grand Prix	1998 500cc British Grand Prix
311	FRA	Régis Laconi	1	1992; 1995–2000; 2002	1999 500cc Valencian Grand Prix	1999 500cc Valencian Grand Prix
311	UK	Jeremy McWilliams	1	1993–2005; 2007; 2014	2001 250cc Dutch TT	2001 250cc Dutch TT
311	JPN	Osamu Miyazaki	1	1991–2002	2002 250cc Japanese Grand Prix	2002 250cc Japanese Grand Prix
311	GER	Steve Jenkner	1	1996–2005	2003 125cc Dutch TT	2003 125cc Dutch TT
311	ESP	Pablo Nieto	1	1998–2008	2003 125cc Portuguese Grand Prix	2003 125cc Portuguese Grand Prix
311	ITA	Andrea Ballerini	1	1995–2006	2003 125cc Australian Grand Prix	2003 125cc Australian Grand Prix
311	AUS	Troy Bayliss	1	1997; 2003–2006	2006 MotoGP Valencian Grand Prix	2006 MotoGP Valencian Grand Prix
311	AUS	Chris Vermeulen	1	2005–2009; 2012	2007 MotoGP French Grand Prix	2007 MotoGP French Grand Prix
311	JPN	Tomoyoshi Koyama	1	2000; 2003–2012; 2014–2015	2007 125cc Catalan Grand Prix	2007 125cc Catalan Grand Prix
311	JPN	Shoya Tomizawa	1	2006–2010	2010 Moto2 Qatar Grand Prix	2010 Moto2 Qatar Grand Prix
311	FRA	Jules Cluzel	1	2005–2011	2010 Moto2 British Grand Prix	2010 Moto2 British Grand Prix
311	CZE	Karel Abraham	1	2005–2015; 2017–2019	2010 Moto2 Valencian Grand Prix	2010 Moto2 Valencian Grand Prix
311	USA	Ben Spies	1	2008–2013	2011 MotoGP Dutch TT	2011 MotoGP Dutch TT
311	ITA	**Michele Pirro**	1	2003–2006; 2010–	2011 Moto2 Valencian Grand Prix	2011 Moto2 Valencian Grand Prix
311	FRA	Louis Rossi	1	2007–2008; 2010–2015	2012 Moto3 French Grand Prix	2012 Moto3 French Grand Prix
311	SUI	Dominique Aegerter	1	2006–2020	2014 Moto2 German Grand Prix	2014 Moto2 German Grand Prix
311	BEL	Xavier Siméon	1	2010–2018	2015 Moto2 German Grand Prix	2015 Moto2 German Grand Prix
311	BEL	Livio Loi	1	2013–2018	2015 Moto3 Indianapolis Grand Prix	2015 Moto3 Indianapolis Grand Prix
311	GER	Philipp Öttl	1	2012–2019	2018 Moto3 Spanish Grand Prix	2018 Moto3 Spanish Grand Prix
311	TUR	Can Öncü	1	2018–2019	2018 Moto3 Valencian Grand Prix	2018 Moto3 Valencian Grand Prix
311	JPN	Kaito Toba	1	2017–2023	2019 Moto3 Qatar Grand Prix	2019 Moto3 Qatar Grand Prix
311	JPN	Tetsuta Nagashima	1	2013–2014; 2016–2022	2020 Moto2 Qatar Grand Prix	2020 Moto2 Qatar Grand Prix
311	ZAF	Darryn Binder	1	2015–2025	2020 Moto3 Catalan Grand Prix	2020 Moto3 Catalan Grand Prix
311	ESP	Xavier Artigas	1	2019; 2021–2024	2021 Moto3 Valencian Grand Prix	2021 Moto3 Valencian Grand Prix
311	SUI	Randy Krummenacher	1	2006–2015; 2023	2023 MotoE British Grand Prix Race 1	2023 MotoE British Grand Prix Race 1
311	JPN	**Taiyo Furusato**	1	2022–	2025 Moto3 Malaysian Grand Prix	2025 Moto3 Malaysian Grand Prix
311	ESP	**Adrián Fernández**	1	2020–	2025 Moto3 Valencian Grand Prix	2025 Moto3 Valencian Grand Prix
311	ITA	**Guido Pini**	1	2025–	2026 Moto3 United States Grand Prix	2026 Moto3 United States Grand Prix
311	MYS	**Hakim Danish**	1	2025–	2026 Moto3 Czech Republic Grand Prix	2026 Moto3 Czech Republic Grand Prix
311	CZE	**Filip Salač**	1	2018–	2026 Moto2 British Grand Prix	2026 Moto2 British Grand Prix
311	ESP	**Daniel Muñoz**	1	2024–	2026 Moto2 Portuguese Grand Prix	2026 Moto2 Portuguese Grand Prix

== By nationality ==
As of the 2026 Portuguese Grand Prix

Rank	Country	Wins	Rider(s)
1	Italy	949	91
2	Spain	846	67
3	United Kingdom	420	54
4	Australia	193	21
5	Japan	190	39
6	Germany	176	27
6	United States	176	13
8	France	100	25
9	Switzerland	79	11
10	Rhodesia	70	3
11	Netherlands	59	15
12	South Africa	57	5
13	Finland	40	4
14	Venezuela	35	3
15	New Zealand	31	7
16	Sweden	23	3
17	Colombia	21	1
18	Portugal	17	1
19	San Marino	16	2
19	Brazil	16	4
21	East Germany	15	1
22	Austria	13	5
22	Hungary	13	2
24	Argentina	9	3
24	Belgium	9	4
26	Ireland	8	2
27	Turkey	6	2
28	Czechoslovakia	4	1
28	Czech Republic	4	3
30	Canada	3	1
30	Malaysia	3	2
32	Thailand	2	1
