= List of motorcycle Grand Prix wins by Valentino Rossi =

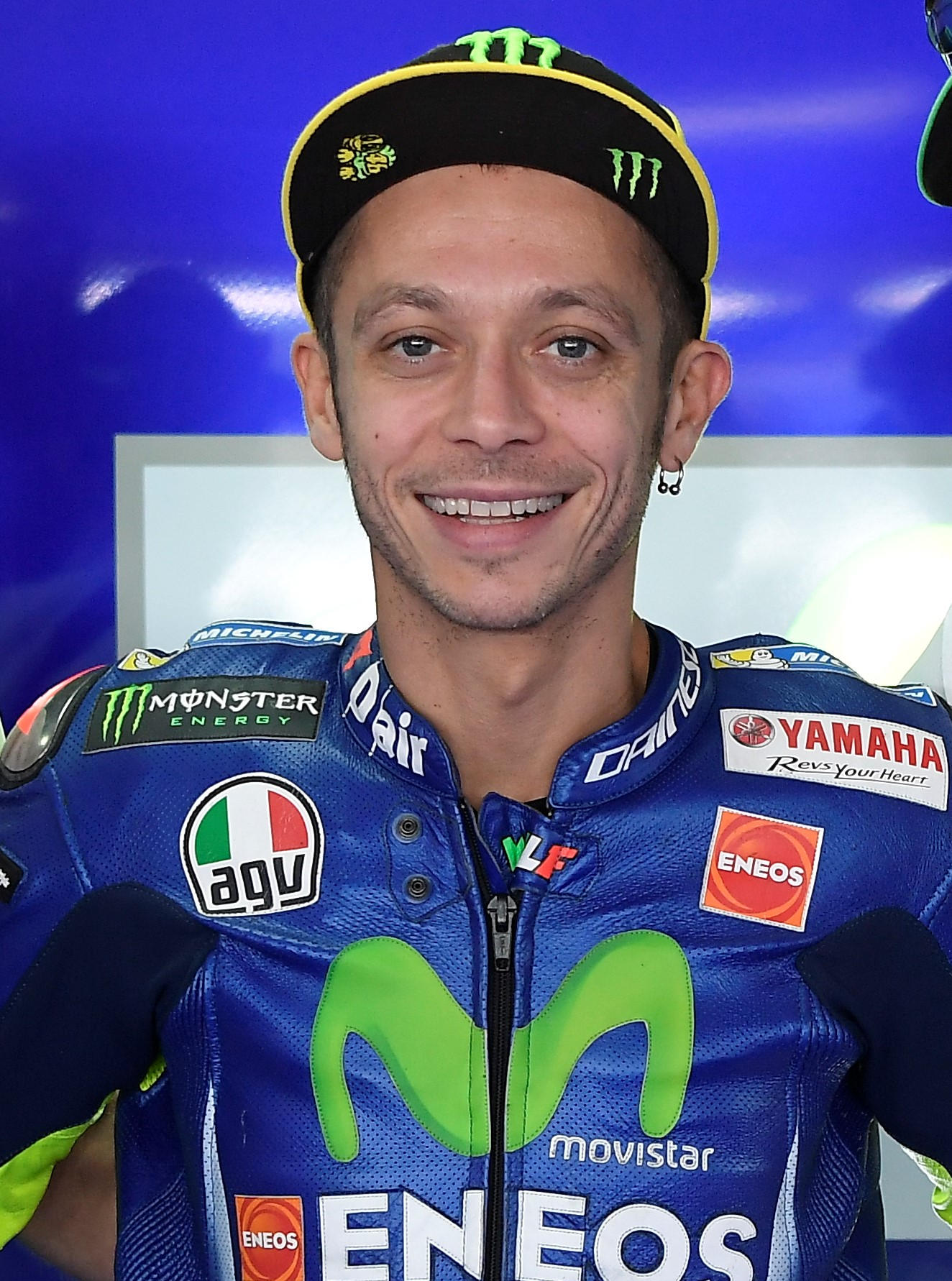
Valentino Rossi in 2017 Aragon Grand Prix

Valentino Rossi is an Italian nine-time Grand Prix world champion - seven of which are in the premier MotoGP class. Rossi raced for Honda's factory team, Yamaha's factory team, and Ducati's factory team. Rossi is also the only road racer to have competed in 400 or more Grands Prix. He has ridden with number 46 his entire career, also when being the title defender. Rossi is one of four riders to have won world championship titles in three different categories, after Mike Hailwood, Phil Read, and Marc Márquez.

Rossi won the 1997 125cc World Championship, the 1999 250cc World Championship, the 2001 500cc World Championship, and the 2002, 2003, 2004, 2005, 2008, and 2009 MotoGP World Championships.

His 115 Grand Prix victories are the second highest of all time. His most successful circuit are Circuit de Barcelona-Catalunya and TT Circuit Assen where he has won ten times. Rossi's largest margin of victory was at the 2002 Portuguese Grand Prix, and the smallest margin of victory was at the 2001 Australian Grand Prix when he beat Max Biaggi by 0.013 seconds in the race.

== Wins ==
Key:

- No. – Victory number.
- Race – Motorcycle Grand Prix career race start number.
- Grid – Starting position on grid.
- Margin – Margin of victory (min:sec.ms).
- † – Rider's Championship winning season.

Grand Prix victories
No.	Race	Date	Class	Season	Grand Prix	Circuit	Grid	Margin	Team	Manufacturer	Motorcycle	Ref
1	11	18 August 1996	125 cc	1996	Czech Republic	Brno Circuit	1	0:00.245	Scuderia AGV Aprilia	Aprilia	Aprilia RS125	
2	16	13 April 1997	125 cc	1997^{†}	Malaysian	Shah Alam Circuit	1	0:00.994	Nastro Azzurro Aprilia	Aprilia	Aprilia RS125	
3	18	4 May 1997	125 cc	1997^{†}	Spanish	Circuito de Jerez-Ángel Nieto	6	0:00.358	Nastro Azzurro Aprilia	Aprilia	Aprilia RS125	
4	19	18 May 1997	125 cc	1997^{†}	Italian	Mugello Circuit	3	0:03.311	Nastro Azzurro Aprilia	Aprilia	Aprilia RS125	
5	21	8 June 1997	125 cc	1997^{†}	French	Circuit Paul Ricard	3	0:02.961	Nastro Azzurro Aprilia	Aprilia	Aprilia RS125	
6	22	28 June 1997	125 cc	1997^{†}	Dutch	TT Circuit Assen	1	0:00.100	Nastro Azzurro Aprilia	Aprilia	Aprilia RS125	
7	23	6 July 1997	125 cc	1997^{†}	City of Imola	Autodromo Internazionale Enzo e Dino Ferrari	1	0:01.625	Nastro Azzurro Aprilia	Aprilia	Aprilia RS125	
8	24	20 July 1997	125 cc	1997^{†}	German	Nürburgring	1	0:00.569	Nastro Azzurro Aprilia	Aprilia	Aprilia RS125	
9	25	3 August 1997	125 cc	1997^{†}	Rio de Janeiro	Autódromo Internacional Nelson Piquet	2	0:01.379	Nastro Azzurro Aprilia	Aprilia	Aprilia RS125	
10	26	17 August 1997	125 cc	1997^{†}	British	Donington Park	4	0:01.780	Nastro Azzurro Aprilia	Aprilia	Aprilia RS125	
11	28	14 September 1997	125 cc	1997^{†}	Catalan	Circuit de Barcelona-Catalunya	4	0:06.002	Nastro Azzurro Aprilia	Aprilia	Aprilia RS125	
12	29	28 September 1997	125 cc	1997^{†}	Indonesian	Sentul International Circuit	4	0:03.028	Nastro Azzurro Aprilia	Aprilia	Aprilia RS125	
13	37	27 June 1998	250 cc	1998	Dutch	TT Circuit Assen	3	0:19.184	Nastro Azzurro Aprilia	Aprilia	Aprilia RS250	
14	41	6 September 1998	250 cc	1998	City of Imola	Autodromo Internazionale Enzo e Dino Ferrari	5	0:02.687	Nastro Azzurro Aprilia	Aprilia	Aprilia RS250	
15	42	20 September 1998	250 cc	1998	Catalan	Circuit de Barcelona-Catalunya	2	0:03.922	Nastro Azzurro Aprilia	Aprilia	Aprilia RS250	
16	43	4 October 1998	250 cc	1998	Australian	Phillip Island Grand Prix Circuit	2	0:01.339	Nastro Azzurro Aprilia	Aprilia	Aprilia RS250	
17	44	25 October 1998	250 cc	1998	Argentine	Autódromo de Buenos Aires Oscar y Juan Gálvez	3	0:05.360	Nastro Azzurro Aprilia	Aprilia	Aprilia RS250	
18	47	9 May 1999	250 cc	1999^{†}	Spanish	Circuito de Jerez-Ángel Nieto	3	0:04.439	Nastro Azzurro Aprilia	Aprilia	Aprilia RS250	
19	49	6 June 1999	250 cc	1999^{†}	Italian	Mugello Circuit	6	0:02.643	Nastro Azzurro Aprilia	Aprilia	Aprilia RS250	
20	50	20 June 1999	250 cc	1999^{†}	Catalan	Circuit de Barcelona-Catalunya	2	0:00.258	Nastro Azzurro Aprilia	Aprilia	Aprilia RS250	
21	52	4 July 1999	250 cc	1999^{†}	British	Donington Park	3	0:01.261	Nastro Azzurro Aprilia	Aprilia	Aprilia RS250	
22	53	18 July 1999	250 cc	1999^{†}	German	Sachsenring	1	0:00.148	Nastro Azzurro Aprilia	Aprilia	Aprilia RS250	
23	54	22 August 1999	250 cc	1999^{†}	Czech Republic	Brno Circuit	3	0:00.700	Nastro Azzurro Aprilia	Aprilia	Aprilia RS250	
24	57	3 October 1999	250 cc	1999^{†}	Australian	Phillip Island Grand Prix Circuit	7	0:00.103	Nastro Azzurro Aprilia	Aprilia	Aprilia RS250	
25	58	10 October 1999	250 cc	1999^{†}	South African	Phakisa Freeway	6	0:01.913	Nastro Azzurro Aprilia	Aprilia	Aprilia RS250	
26	59	24 October 1999	250 cc	1999^{†}	Rio de Janeiro	Autódromo Internacional Nelson Piquet	2	0:01.328	Nastro Azzurro Aprilia	Aprilia	Aprilia RS250	
27	69	9 July 2000	500 cc	2000	British	Donington Park	4	0:00.395	Nastro Azzurro Honda	Honda	Honda NSR500	
28	74	7 October 2000	500 cc	2000	Rio de Janeiro	Autódromo Internacional Nelson Piquet	4	0:00.970	Nastro Azzurro Honda	Honda	Honda NSR500	
29	77	8 April 2001	500 cc	2001^{†}	Japanese	Suzuka International Racing Course	7	0:00.724	Nastro Azzurro Honda	Honda	Honda NSR500	
30	78	22 April 2001	500 cc	2001^{†}	South African	Phakisa Freeway	1	0:00.660	Nastro Azzurro Honda	Honda	Honda NSR500	
31	79	6 May 2001	500 cc	2001^{†}	Spanish	Circuito de Jerez-Ángel Nieto	1	0:02.307	Nastro Azzurro Honda	Honda	Honda NSR500	
32	82	17 June 2001	500 cc	2001^{†}	Catalan	Circuit de Barcelona-Catalunya	1	0:02.579	Nastro Azzurro Honda	Honda	Honda NSR500	
33	84	8 July 2001	500 cc	2001^{†}	British	Donington Park	11	0:01.794	Nastro Azzurro Honda	Honda	Honda NSR500	
34	86	26 August 2001	500 cc	2001^{†}	Czech Republic	Brno Circuit	2	0:03.374	Nastro Azzurro Honda	Honda	Honda NSR500	
35	87	9 September 2001	500 cc	2001^{†}	Portuguese	Autódromo do Estoril	3	0:01.756	Nastro Azzurro Honda	Honda	Honda NSR500	
36	89	7 October 2001	500 cc	2001^{†}	Pacific	Twin Ring Motegi	4	0:02.607	Nastro Azzurro Honda	Honda	Honda NSR500	
37	90	14 October 2001	500 cc	2001^{†}	Australian	Phillip Island Grand Prix Circuit	2	0:00.013	Nastro Azzurro Honda	Honda	Honda NSR500	
38	91	21 October 2001	500 cc	2001^{†}	Malaysian	Sepang International Circuit	2	0:03.551	Nastro Azzurro Honda	Honda	Honda NSR500	
39	92	3 November 2001	500 cc	2001^{†}	Rio de Janeiro	Autódromo Internacional Nelson Piquet	5	0:00.143	Nastro Azzurro Honda	Honda	Honda NSR500	
40	93	7 April 2002	MotoGP	2002^{†}	Japanese	Suzuka International Racing Course	1	0:01.550	Repsol Honda Team	Honda	Honda RC211V	
41	95	5 May 2002	MotoGP	2002^{†}	Spanish	Circuito de Jerez-Ángel Nieto	1	0:01.190	Repsol Honda Team	Honda	Honda RC211V	
42	96	19 May 2002	MotoGP	2002^{†}	French	Bugatti Circuit	1	0:00.217	Repsol Honda Team	Honda	Honda RC211V	
43	97	2 June 2002	MotoGP	2002^{†}	Italian	Mugello Circuit	1	0:02.404	Repsol Honda Team	Honda	Honda RC211V	
44	98	16 June 2002	MotoGP	2002^{†}	Catalan	Circuit de Barcelona-Catalunya	4	0:00.880	Repsol Honda Team	Honda	Honda RC211V	
45	99	29 June 2002	MotoGP	2002^{†}	Dutch	TT Circuit Assen	1	0:02.233	Repsol Honda Team	Honda	Honda RC211V	
46	100	14 July 2002	MotoGP	2002^{†}	British	Donington Park	1	0:02.371	Repsol Honda Team	Honda	Honda RC211V	
47	101	21 July 2002	MotoGP	2002^{†}	German	Sachsenring	6	0:00.730	Repsol Honda Team	Honda	Honda RC211V	
48	103	8 September 2002	MotoGP	2002^{†}	Portuguese	Autódromo do Estoril	3	0:22.200	Repsol Honda Team	Honda	Honda RC211V	
49	104	22 September 2002	MotoGP	2002^{†}	Rio de Janeiro	Autódromo Internacional Nelson Piquet	2	0:01.674	Repsol Honda Team	Honda	Honda RC211V	
50	107	20 October 2002	MotoGP	2002^{†}	Australian	Phillip Island Grand Prix Circuit	7	0:09.782	Repsol Honda Team	Honda	Honda RC211V	
51	109	6 April 2003	MotoGP	2003^{†}	Japanese	Suzuka International Racing Course	1	0:06.445	Repsol Honda Team	Honda	Honda RC211V	
52	111	11 May 2003	MotoGP	2003^{†}	Spanish	Circuito de Jerez-Ángel Nieto	5	0:06.333	Repsol Honda Team	Honda	Honda RC211V	
53	113	8 June 2003	MotoGP	2003^{†}	Italian	Mugello Circuit	1	0:01.416	Repsol Honda Team	Honda	Honda RC211V	
54	118	17 August 2003	MotoGP	2003^{†}	Czech Republic	Brno Circuit	1	0:00.042	Repsol Honda Team	Honda	Honda RC211V	
55	119	7 September 2003	MotoGP	2003^{†}	Portuguese	Autódromo do Estoril	3	0:02.094	Repsol Honda Team	Honda	Honda RC211V	
56	120	20 September 2003	MotoGP	2003^{†}	Rio de Janeiro	Autódromo Internacional Nelson Piquet	1	0:03.109	Repsol Honda Team	Honda	Honda RC211V	
57	122	12 October 2003	MotoGP	2003^{†}	Malaysian	Sepang International Circuit	1	0:02.042	Repsol Honda Team	Honda	Honda RC211V	
58	123	19 October 2003	MotoGP	2003^{†}	Australian	Phillip Island Grand Prix Circuit	1	0:05.212	Repsol Honda Team	Honda	Honda RC211V	
59	124	2 November 2003	MotoGP	2003^{†}	Valencian Community	Circuit de la Comunitat Valenciana Ricardo Tormo	1	0:00.681	Repsol Honda Team	Honda	Honda RC211V	
60	125	18 April 2004	MotoGP	2004^{†}	South African	Phakisa Freeway	1	0:00.210	Gauloises Fortuna Yamaha	Yamaha	Yamaha YZR-M1	
61	128	6 June 2004	MotoGP	2004^{†}	Italian	Mugello Circuit	3	0:00.361	Gauloises Fortuna Yamaha	Yamaha	Yamaha YZR-M1	
62	129	13 June 2004	MotoGP	2004^{†}	Catalan	Circuit de Barcelona-Catalunya	2	0:00.159	Gauloises Fortuna Yamaha	Yamaha	Yamaha YZR-M1	
63	130	26 June 2004	MotoGP	2004^{†}	Dutch	TT Circuit Assen	1	0:00.456	Gauloises Fortuna Yamaha	Yamaha	Yamaha YZR-M1	
64	133	25 July 2004	MotoGP	2004^{†}	British	Donington Park	1	0:02.945	Gauloises Fortuna Yamaha	Yamaha	Yamaha YZR-M1	
65	135	5 September 2004	MotoGP	2004^{†}	Portuguese	Autódromo do Estoril	2	0:05.111	Gauloises Fortuna Yamaha	Yamaha	Yamaha YZR-M1	
66	138	10 October 2004	MotoGP	2004^{†}	Malaysian	Sepang International Circuit	1	0:03.666	Gauloises Fortuna Yamaha	Yamaha	Yamaha YZR-M1	
67	139	17 October 2004	MotoGP	2004^{†}	Australian	Phillip Island Grand Prix Circuit	2	0:00.097	Gauloises Fortuna Yamaha	Yamaha	Yamaha YZR-M1	
68	140	31 October 2004	MotoGP	2004^{†}	Valencian Community	Circuit de la Comunitat Valenciana Ricardo Tormo	3	0:00.425	Gauloises Fortuna Yamaha	Yamaha	Yamaha YZR-M1	
69	141	10 April 2005	MotoGP	2005^{†}	Spanish	Circuito de Jerez-Ángel Nieto	1	0:08.631	Gauloises Yamaha Team	Yamaha	Yamaha YZR-M1	
70	143	1 May 2005	MotoGP	2005^{†}	Chinese	Shanghai International Circuit	6	0:01.700	Gauloises Yamaha Team	Yamaha	Yamaha YZR-M1	
71	144	15 May 2005	MotoGP	2005^{†}	French	Bugatti Circuit	1	0:00.382	Gauloises Yamaha Team	Yamaha	Yamaha YZR-M1	
72	145	5 June 2005	MotoGP	2005^{†}	Italian	Mugello Circuit	1	0:00.359	Gauloises Yamaha Team	Yamaha	Yamaha YZR-M1	
73	146	12 June 2005	MotoGP	2005^{†}	Catalan	Circuit de Barcelona-Catalunya	3	0:01.094	Gauloises Yamaha Team	Yamaha	Yamaha YZR-M1	
74	147	25 June 2005	MotoGP	2005^{†}	Dutch	TT Circuit Assen	1	0:01.583	Gauloises Yamaha Team	Yamaha	Yamaha YZR-M1	
75	149	24 July 2005	MotoGP	2005^{†}	British	Donington Park	1	0:03.169	Gauloises Yamaha Team	Yamaha	Yamaha YZR-M1	
76	150	31 July 2005	MotoGP	2005^{†}	German	Sachsenring	4	0:00.685	Gauloises Yamaha Team	Yamaha	Yamaha YZR-M1	
77	151	28 August 2005	MotoGP	2005^{†}	Czech Republic	Brno Circuit	4	0:01.837	Gauloises Yamaha Team	Yamaha	Yamaha YZR-M1	
78	154	1 October 2005	MotoGP	2005^{†}	Qatar	Losail International Circuit	3	0:01.670	Gauloises Yamaha Team	Yamaha	Yamaha YZR-M1	
79	155	16 October 2005	MotoGP	2005^{†}	Australian	Phillip Island Grand Prix Circuit	2	0:01.007	Gauloises Yamaha Team	Yamaha	Yamaha YZR-M1	
80	159	8 April 2006	MotoGP	2006	Qatar	Losail International Circuit	6	0:00.900	Camel Yamaha Team	Yamaha	Yamaha YZR-M1	
81	163	4 June 2006	MotoGP	2006	Italian	Mugello Circuit	3	0:00.575	Camel Yamaha Team	Yamaha	Yamaha YZR-M1	
82	164	18 June 2006	MotoGP	2006	Catalan	Circuit de Barcelona-Catalunya	1	0:04.509	Camel Yamaha Team	Yamaha	Yamaha YZR-M1	
83	167	16 July 2006	MotoGP	2006	German	Sachsenring	10	0:00.145	Camel Yamaha Team	Yamaha	Yamaha YZR-M1	
84	170	10 September 2006	MotoGP	2006	Malaysian	Sepang International Circuit	1	0:00.849	Camel Yamaha Team	Yamaha	Yamaha YZR-M1	
85	176	25 March 2007	MotoGP	2007	Spanish	Circuito de Jerez-Ángel Nieto	2	0:01.246	Fiat Yamaha Team	Yamaha	Yamaha YZR-M1	
86	180	3 June 2007	MotoGP	2007	Italian	Mugello Circuit	3	0:03.074	Fiat Yamaha Team	Yamaha	Yamaha YZR-M1	
87	183	30 June 2007	MotoGP	2007	Dutch	TT Circuit Assen	11	0:01.909	Fiat Yamaha Team	Yamaha	Yamaha YZR-M1	
88	188	16 September 2007	MotoGP	2007	Portuguese	Autódromo do Estoril	3	0:00.175	Fiat Yamaha Team	Yamaha	Yamaha YZR-M1	
89	196	4 May 2008	MotoGP	2008^{†}	Chinese	Shanghai International Circuit	2	0:03.890	Fiat Yamaha Team	Yamaha	Yamaha YZR-M1	
90	197	18 May 2008	MotoGP	2008^{†}	French	Bugatti Circuit	4	0:04.997	Fiat Yamaha Team	Yamaha	Yamaha YZR-M1	
91	198	1 June 2008	MotoGP	2008^{†}	Italian	Mugello Circuit	1	0:02.201	Fiat Yamaha Team	Yamaha	Yamaha YZR-M1	
92	203	20 July 2008	MotoGP	2008^{†}	United States	WeatherTech Raceway Laguna Seca	2	0:13.001	Fiat Yamaha Team	Yamaha	Yamaha YZR-M1	
93	204	17 August 2008	MotoGP	2008^{†}	Czech Republic	Brno Circuit	2	0:15.004	Fiat Yamaha Team	Yamaha	Yamaha YZR-M1	
94	205	31 August 2008	MotoGP	2008^{†}	San Marino and Rimini Riviera	Misano World Circuit Marco Simoncelli	2	0:03.163	Fiat Yamaha Team	Yamaha	Yamaha YZR-M1	
95	206	14 September 2008	MotoGP	2008^{†}	Indianapolis	Indianapolis Motor Speedway	1	0:05.972	Fiat Yamaha Team	Yamaha	Yamaha YZR-M1	
96	207	28 September 2008	MotoGP	2008^{†}	Japanese	Twin Ring Motegi	4	0:01.943	Fiat Yamaha Team	Yamaha	Yamaha YZR-M1	
97	209	19 October 2008	MotoGP	2008^{†}	Malaysian	Sepang International Circuit	2	0:04.008	Fiat Yamaha Team	Yamaha	Yamaha YZR-M1	
98	213	3 May 2009	MotoGP	2009^{†}	Spanish	Circuito de Jerez-Ángel Nieto	4	0:02.700	Fiat Yamaha Team	Yamaha	Yamaha YZR-M1	
99	216	14 June 2009	MotoGP	2009^{†}	Catalan	Circuit de Barcelona-Catalunya	2	0:00.095	Fiat Yamaha Team	Yamaha	Yamaha YZR-M1	
100	217	27 June 2009	MotoGP	2009^{†}	Dutch	TT Circuit Assen	1	0:05.368	Fiat Yamaha Team	Yamaha	Yamaha YZR-M1	
101	219	19 July 2009	MotoGP	2009^{†}	German	Sachsenring	1	0:00.099	Fiat Yamaha Team	Yamaha	Yamaha YZR-M1	
102	221	16 August 2009	MotoGP	2009^{†}	Czech Republic	Brno Circuit	1	0:11.766	Fiat Yamaha Team	Yamaha	Yamaha YZR-M1	
103	223	6 September 2009	MotoGP	2009^{†}	San Marino and Rimini Riviera	Misano World Circuit Marco Simoncelli	1	0:02.416	Fiat Yamaha Team	Yamaha	Yamaha YZR-M1	
104	228	11 April 2010	MotoGP	2010	Qatar	Losail International Circuit	2	0:01.022	Fiat Yamaha Team	Yamaha	Yamaha YZR-M1	
105	238	10 October 2010	MotoGP	2010	Malaysian	Sepang International Circuit	6	0:00.224	Fiat Yamaha Team	Yamaha	Yamaha YZR-M1	
106	283	29 June 2013	MotoGP	2013	Dutch	TT Circuit Assen	4	0:02.170	Yamaha Factory Racing	Yamaha	Yamaha YZR-M1	
107	307	14 September 2014	MotoGP	2014	San Marino and Rimini Riviera	Misano World Circuit Marco Simoncelli	3	0:01.578	Movistar Yamaha MotoGP	Yamaha	Yamaha YZR-M1	
108	310	19 October 2014	MotoGP	2014	Australian	Phillip Island Grand Prix Circuit	8	0:10.836	Movistar Yamaha MotoGP	Yamaha	Yamaha YZR-M1	
109	313	29 March 2015	MotoGP	2015	Qatar	Losail International Circuit	8	0:00.174	Movistar Yamaha MotoGP	Yamaha	Yamaha YZR-M1	
110	315	19 April 2015	MotoGP	2015	Argentine	Autódromo Termas de Río Hondo	8	0:05.685	Movistar Yamaha MotoGP	Yamaha	Yamaha YZR-M1	
111	320	27 June 2015	MotoGP	2015	Dutch	TT Circuit Assen	1	0:01.242	Movistar Yamaha MotoGP	Yamaha	Yamaha YZR-M1	
112	324	30 August 2015	MotoGP	2015	British	Silverstone Circuit	4	0:03.010	Movistar Yamaha MotoGP	Yamaha	Yamaha YZR-M1	
113	334	24 April 2016	MotoGP	2016	Spanish	Circuito de Jerez-Ángel Nieto	1	0:02.386	Movistar Yamaha MotoGP	Yamaha	Yamaha YZR-M1	
114	337	5 June 2016	MotoGP	2016	Catalan	Circuit de Barcelona-Catalunya	5	0:02.652	Movistar Yamaha MotoGP	Yamaha	Yamaha YZR-M1	
115	356	25 June 2017	MotoGP	2017	Dutch	TT Circuit Assen	4	0:00.063	Movistar Yamaha MotoGP	Yamaha	Yamaha YZR-M1	

=== Number of wins at different Grands Prix ===
No.	Grand Prix	Years won	Wins
1	Catalan Grand Prix	1997, 1998, 1999, 2001, 2002, 2004, 2005, 2006, 2009, 2016	10
2	Dutch TT	1997, 1998, 2002, 2004, 2005, 2007, 2009, 2013, 2015, 2017	10
3	Italian Grand Prix	1997, 1999, 2002, 2003, 2004, 2005, 2006, 2007, 2008	9
4	Spanish Grand Prix	1997, 1999, 2001, 2002, 2003, 2005, 2007, 2009, 2016	9
5	Australian Grand Prix	1998, 1999, 2001, 2002, 2003, 2004, 2005, 2014	8
6	British Grand Prix	1997, 1999, 2000, 2001, 2002, 2004, 2005, 2015	8
7	Czech Republic Grand Prix	1996, 1999, 2001, 2003, 2005, 2008, 2009	7
8	Malaysian Grand Prix	1997, 2001, 2003, 2004, 2006, 2008, 2010	7
9	Rio de Janeiro Grand Prix	1997, 1999, 2000, 2001, 2002, 2003	6
10	German Grand Prix	1997, 1999, 2002, 2005, 2006, 2009	6
11	Portuguese Grand Prix	2001, 2002, 2003, 2004, 2007	5
12	French Grand Prix	1997, 2002, 2005, 2008	4
13	Japanese Grand Prix	2001, 2002, 2003, 2008	4
14	Qatar Grand Prix	2005, 2006, 2010, 2015	4
15	South African Grand Prix	1999, 2001, 2004	3
16	San Marino and Rimini Riviera Grand Prix	2008, 2009, 2014	3
17	City of Imola Grand Prix	1997, 1998	2
18	Valencian Community Grand Prix	2003, 2004	2
19	Chinese Grand Prix	2005, 2008	2
20	Argentine Grand Prix	1998, 2015	2
21	Indonesian Grand Prix	1997	1
22	Pacific Grand Prix	2001	1
23	United States Grand Prix	2008	1
24	Indianapolis Grand Prix	2008	1
Total number of Grand Prix wins:			115

=== Number of wins at different circuits ===
No.	Circuit	Years won	Wins
1	Circuit de Barcelona-Catalunya	1997, 1998, 1999, 2001, 2002, 2004, 2005, 2006, 2009, 2016	10
2	TT Circuit Assen	1997, 1998, 2002, 2004, 2005, 2007, 2009, 2013, 2015, 2017	10
3	Mugello Circuit	1997, 1999, 2002, 2003, 2004, 2005, 2006, 2007, 2008	9
4	Circuito de Jerez-Ángel Nieto	1997, 1999, 2001, 2002, 2003, 2005, 2007, 2009, 2016	9
5	Phillip Island Grand Prix Circuit	1998, 1999, 2001, 2002, 2003, 2004, 2005, 2014	8
6	Donington Park	1997, 1999, 2000, 2001, 2002, 2004, 2005	7
7	Brno Circuit	1996, 1999, 2001, 2003, 2005, 2008, 2009	7
8	Autódromo Internacional Nelson Piquet	1997, 1999, 2000, 2001, 2002, 2003	6
9	Sepang International Circuit	2001, 2003, 2004, 2006, 2008, 2010	6
10	Autódromo do Estoril	2001, 2002, 2003, 2004, 2007	5
11	Sachsenring	1999, 2002, 2005, 2006, 2009	5
12	Losail International Circuit	2005, 2006, 2010, 2015	4
13	Suzuka International Racing Course	2001, 2002, 2003	3
14	Phakisa Freeway	1999, 2001, 2004	3
15	Bugatti Circuit	2002, 2005, 2008	3
16	Misano World Circuit Marco Simoncelli	2008, 2009, 2014	3
17	Autodromo Internazionale Enzo e Dino Ferrari	1997, 1998	2
18	Circuit de la Comunitat Valenciana Ricardo Tormo	2003, 2004	2
19	Shanghai International Circuit	2005, 2008	2
20	Twin Ring Motegi	2001, 2008	2
21	Shah Alam Circuit	1997	1
22	Circuit Paul Ricard	1997	1
23	Nürburgring	1997	1
24	Sentul International Circuit	1997	1
25	Autódromo de Buenos Aires Oscar y Juan Gálvez	1998	1
26	WeatherTech Raceway Laguna Seca	2008	1
27	Indianapolis Motor Speedway	2008	1
28	Autódromo Termas de Río Hondo	2015	1
29	Silverstone Circuit	2015	1
Total number of Grand Prix wins:			115

== See also ==
- List of Grand Prix motorcycle racing winners
- List of Grand Prix motorcycle racing rider records
- List of 500cc/MotoGP rider records
