= List of motorcycle Grand Prix wins by Mick Doohan =

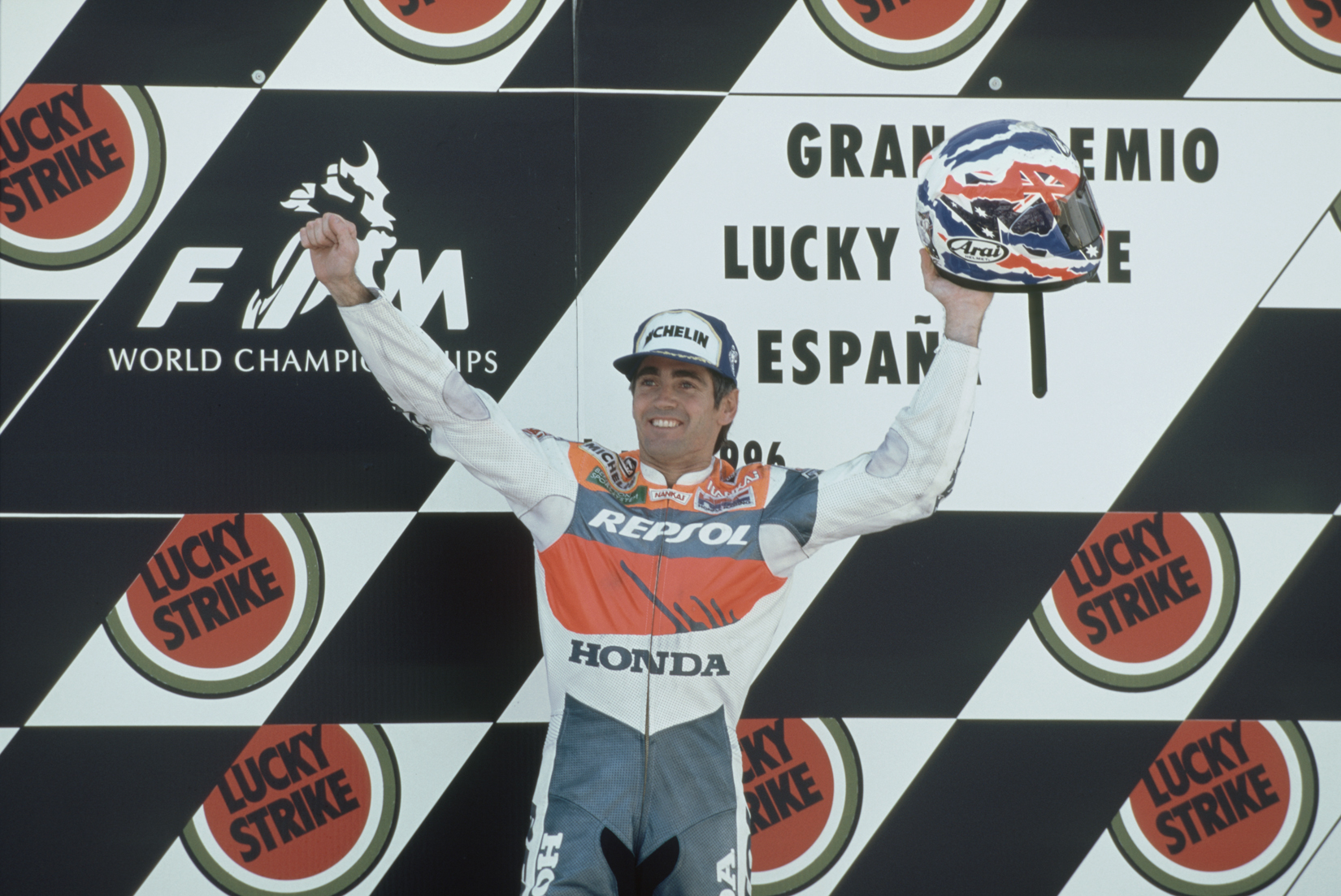
Mick Doohan at the 1996 Spanish Grand Prix, one of 54 Grands Prix he won in his career.

Mick Doohan is an Australian five-time Grand Prix world champion - all five of which are in the premier 500cc class (now known as MotoGP). Doohan raced for Honda's factory team for the entirety of his career.

Doohan won the 1994, 1995, 1996, 1997, and 1998 500cc World Championships, before a crash during practice for the 1999 Spanish Grand Prix ended his career.

His 54 Grand Prix victories are the equal seventh highest of all time (with Dani Pedrosa). His most successful circuit is the Mugello Circuit, where he won six times. Doohan's largest margin of victory was at the 1992 Japanese Grand Prix when he beat Doug Chandler by 28.298 seconds in the race, and his smallest margin of victory was at the 1996 City of Imola Grand Prix when he beat teammate Àlex Crivillé by 0.104 seconds in the race.

== Wins ==
Key:

- No. – Victory number.
- Race – Motorcycle Grand Prix career race start number.
- Grid – Starting position on grid.
- Margin – Margin of victory (min:sec.ms).
- † – Riders' Championship winning season.

Grand Prix victories
No.	Race	Date	Class	Season	Grand Prix	Circuit	Grid	Margin	Team	Manufacturer	Motorcycle	Ref
1	26	2 September 1990	500 cc	1990	Hungarian	Hungaroring	1	0:25.442	Rothmans Honda	Honda	Honda NSR500	
2	31	12 May 1991	500 cc	1991	Spanish	Circuito de Jerez-Ángel Nieto	3	0:09.920	Rothmans Honda	Honda	Honda NSR500	
3	32	19 May 1991	500 cc	1991	Italian	Misano World Circuit Marco Simoncelli	5	0:08.677	Rothmans Honda	Honda	Honda NSR500	
4	34	9 June 1991	500 cc	1991	Austrian	Salzburgring	1	0:00.185	Rothmans Honda	Honda	Honda NSR500	
5	43	29 March 1992	500 cc	1992	Japanese	Suzuka International Racing Course	5	0:28.298	Rothmans Honda	Honda	Honda NSR500	
6	44	12 April 1992	500 cc	1992	Australian	Eastern Creek Raceway	1	0:06.822	Rothmans Honda	Honda	Honda NSR500	
7	45	19 April 1992	500 cc	1992	Malaysian	Shah Alam Circuit	1	0:10.433	Rothmans Honda	Honda	Honda NSR500	
8	46	10 May 1992	500 cc	1992	Spanish	Circuito de Jerez-Ángel Nieto	1	0:18.991	Rothmans Honda	Honda	Honda NSR500	
9	49	14 June 1992	500 cc	1992	German	Hockenheimring	1	0:24.626	Rothmans Honda	Honda	Honda NSR500	
10	60	18 July 1993	500 cc	1993	San Marino	Mugello Circuit	1	0:09.953	Rothmans Honda	Honda	Honda NSR500	
11	66	10 April 1994	500 cc	1994^{†}	Malaysian	Shah Alam Circuit	4	0:05.225	Honda Team HRC	Honda	Honda NSR500	
12	68	8 May 1994	500 cc	1994^{†}	Spanish	Circuito de Jerez-Ángel Nieto	3	0:00.489	Honda Team HRC	Honda	Honda NSR500	
13	69	22 May 1994	500 cc	1994^{†}	Austrian	Salzburgring	1	0:12.610	Honda Team HRC	Honda	Honda NSR500	
14	70	12 June 1994	500 cc	1994^{†}	German	Hockenheimring	1	0:13.982	Honda Team HRC	Honda	Honda NSR500	
15	71	25 June 1994	500 cc	1994^{†}	Dutch	TT Circuit Assen	1	0:01.900	Honda Team HRC	Honda	Honda NSR500	
16	72	3 July 1994	500 cc	1994^{†}	Italian	Mugello Circuit	3	0:05.784	Honda Team HRC	Honda	Honda NSR500	
17	73	17 July 1994	500 cc	1994^{†}	French	Bugatti Circuit	1	0:06.101	Honda Team HRC	Honda	Honda NSR500	
18	75	21 August 1994	500 cc	1994^{†}	Czech Republic	Brno Circuit	2	0:03.322	Honda Team HRC	Honda	Honda NSR500	
19	77	25 September 1994	500 cc	1994^{†}	Argentine	Autódromo de Buenos Aires Oscar y Juan Gálvez	2	0:08.742	Honda Team HRC	Honda	Honda NSR500	
20	79	26 March 1995	500 cc	1995^{†}	Australian	Eastern Creek Raceway	1	0:13.446	Repsol YPF Honda Team	Honda	Honda NSR500	
21	80	2 April 1995	500 cc	1995^{†}	Malaysian	Shah Alam Circuit	1	0:06.799	Repsol YPF Honda Team	Honda	Honda NSR500	
22	84	11 June 1995	500 cc	1995^{†}	Italian	Mugello Circuit	1	0:03.728	Repsol YPF Honda Team	Honda	Honda NSR500	
23	85	24 June 1995	500 cc	1995^{†}	Dutch	TT Circuit Assen	2	0:00.114	Repsol YPF Honda Team	Honda	Honda NSR500	
24	86	9 July 1995	500 cc	1995^{†}	French	Bugatti Circuit	1	0:21.923	Repsol YPF Honda Team	Honda	Honda NSR500	
25	87	23 July 1995	500 cc	1995^{†}	British	Donington Park	1	0:04.285	Repsol YPF Honda Team	Honda	Honda NSR500	
26	90	24 September 1995	500 cc	1995^{†}	Argentine	Autódromo de Buenos Aires Oscar y Juan Gálvez	2	0:02.293	Repsol YPF Honda Team	Honda	Honda NSR500	
27	93	7 April 1996	500 cc	1996^{†}	Indonesian	Sentul International Circuit	1	0:03.227	Team Repsol Honda	Honda	Honda NSR500	
28	95	12 May 1996	500 cc	1996^{†}	Spanish	Circuito de Jerez-Ángel Nieto	1	0:02.677	Team Repsol Honda	Honda	Honda NSR500	
29	96	26 May 1996	500 cc	1996^{†}	Italian	Mugello Circuit	1	0:00.726	Team Repsol Honda	Honda	Honda NSR500	
30	97	9 June 1996	500 cc	1996^{†}	French	Circuit Paul Ricard	2	0:11.539	Team Repsol Honda	Honda	Honda NSR500	
31	98	29 June 1996	500 cc	1996^{†}	Dutch	TT Circuit Assen	3	0:01.496	Team Repsol Honda	Honda	Honda NSR500	
32	100	21 July 1996	500 cc	1996^{†}	British	Donington Park	1	0:03.319	Team Repsol Honda	Honda	Honda NSR500	
33	103	1 September 1996	500 cc	1996^{†}	City of Imola	Autodromo Internazionale Enzo e Dino Ferrari	1	0:00.104	Team Repsol Honda	Honda	Honda NSR500	
34	105	6 October 1996	500 cc	1996^{†}	Rio de Janeiro	Autódromo Internacional Nelson Piquet	1	0:00.465	Team Repsol Honda	Honda	Honda NSR500	
35	107	13 April 1997	500 cc	1997^{†}	Malaysian	Shah Alam Circuit	2	0:11.796	Repsol YPF Honda Team	Honda	Honda NSR500	
36	108	20 April 1997	500 cc	1997^{†}	Japanese	Suzuka International Racing Course	2	0:00.431	Repsol YPF Honda Team	Honda	Honda NSR500	
37	110	18 May 1997	500 cc	1997^{†}	Italian	Mugello Circuit	1	0:10.056	Repsol YPF Honda Team	Honda	Honda NSR500	
38	111	1 June 1997	500 cc	1997^{†}	Austrian	Red Bull Ring	1	0:22.077	Repsol YPF Honda Team	Honda	Honda NSR500	
39	112	8 June 1997	500 cc	1997^{†}	French	Circuit Paul Ricard	1	0:04.292	Repsol YPF Honda Team	Honda	Honda NSR500	
40	113	28 June 1997	500 cc	1997^{†}	Dutch	TT Circuit Assen	1	0:10.560	Repsol YPF Honda Team	Honda	Honda NSR500	
41	114	6 July 1997	500 cc	1997^{†}	City of Imola	Autodromo Internazionale Enzo e Dino Ferrari	1	0:08.646	Repsol YPF Honda Team	Honda	Honda NSR500	
42	115	20 July 1997	500 cc	1997^{†}	German	Nürburgring	1	0:05.690	Repsol YPF Honda Team	Honda	Honda NSR500	
43	116	3 August 1997	500 cc	1997^{†}	Rio de Janeiro	Autódromo Internacional Nelson Piquet	1	0:00.706	Repsol YPF Honda Team	Honda	Honda NSR500	
44	117	17 August 1997	500 cc	1997^{†}	British	Donington Park	1	0:00.231	Repsol YPF Honda Team	Honda	Honda NSR500	
45	118	31 August 1997	500 cc	1997^{†}	Czech Republic	Brno Circuit	1	0:14.858	Repsol YPF Honda Team	Honda	Honda NSR500	
46	119	14 September 1997	500 cc	1997^{†}	Catalan	Circuit de Barcelona-Catalunya	1	0:00.432	Repsol YPF Honda Team	Honda	Honda NSR500	
47	123	19 April 1998	500 cc	1998^{†}	Malaysian	Johor Circuit	1	0:02.634	Repsol Honda	Honda	Honda NSR500	
48	125	17 May 1998	500 cc	1998^{†}	Italian	Mugello Circuit	1	0:05.395	Repsol Honda	Honda	Honda NSR500	
49	128	27 June 1998	500 cc	1998^{†}	Dutch	TT Circuit Assen	1	0:00.560	Repsol Honda	Honda	Honda NSR500	
50	130	19 July 1998	500 cc	1998^{†}	German	Sachsenring	3	0:02.873	Repsol Honda	Honda	Honda NSR500	
51	132	6 September 1998	500 cc	1998^{†}	City of Imola	Autodromo Internazionale Enzo e Dino Ferrari	3	0:06.564	Repsol Honda	Honda	Honda NSR500	
52	133	20 September 1998	500 cc	1998^{†}	Catalan	Circuit de Barcelona-Catalunya	4	0:01.974	Repsol Honda	Honda	Honda NSR500	
53	134	4 October 1998	500 cc	1998^{†}	Australian	Phillip Island Grand Prix Circuit	1	0:00.818	Repsol Honda	Honda	Honda NSR500	
54	135	25 October 1998	500 cc	1998^{†}	Argentine	Autódromo de Buenos Aires Oscar y Juan Gálvez	1	0:04.762	Repsol Honda	Honda	Honda NSR500	

=== Number of wins at different Grands Prix ===
No.	Grand Prix	Years won	Wins
1	Italian Grand Prix	1991, 1994, 1995, 1996, 1997, 1998	6
2	Malaysian Grand Prix	1992, 1994, 1995, 1997, 1998	5
3	Dutch TT	1994, 1995, 1996, 1997, 1998	5
4	Spanish Grand Prix	1991, 1992, 1994, 1996	4
5	French Grand Prix	1994, 1995, 1996, 1997	4
6	German Grand Prix	1992, 1994, 1997, 1998	4
7	Austrian Grand Prix	1991, 1994, 1997	3
8	British Grand Prix	1995, 1996, 1997	3
9	City of Imola Grand Prix	1996, 1997, 1998	3
10	Australian Grand Prix	1992, 1995, 1998	3
11	Argentine Grand Prix	1994, 1995, 1998	3
12	Japanese Grand Prix	1992, 1997	2
13	Rio de Janeiro Grand Prix	1996, 1997	2
14	Czech Republic Grand Prix	1994, 1997	2
15	Catalan Grand Prix	1997, 1998	2
16	Hungarian Grand Prix	1990	1
17	San Marino Grand Prix	1993	1
18	Indonesian Grand Prix	1996	1
Total number of Grand Prix wins:			54

=== Number of wins at different circuits ===
No.	Circuit	Years won	Wins
1	Mugello Circuit	1993, 1994, 1995, 1996, 1997, 1998	6
2	TT Circuit Assen	1994, 1995, 1996, 1997, 1998	5
3	Circuito de Jerez-Ángel Nieto	1991, 1992, 1994, 1996	4
4	Shah Alam Circuit	1992, 1994, 1995, 1997	4
5	Donington Park	1995, 1996, 1997	3
6	Autodromo Internazionale Enzo e Dino Ferrari	1996, 1997, 1998	3
7	Autódromo de Buenos Aires Oscar y Juan Gálvez	1994, 1995, 1998	3
8	Salzburgring	1991, 1994	2
9	Hockenheimring	1992, 1994	2
10	Eastern Creek Raceway	1992, 1995	2
11	Bugatti Circuit	1994, 1995	2
12	Suzuka International Racing Course	1992, 1997	2
13	Circuit Paul Ricard	1996, 1997	2
14	Autódromo Internacional Nelson Piquet	1996, 1997	2
15	Brno Circuit	1994, 1997	2
16	Circuit de Barcelona-Catalunya	1997, 1998	2
17	Hungaroring	1990	1
18	Misano World Circuit Marco Simoncelli	1991	1
19	Sentul International Circuit	1996	1
20	Red Bull Ring	1997	1
21	Nürburgring	1997	1
22	Johor Circuit	1998	1
23	Sachsenring	1998	1
24	Phillip Island Grand Prix Circuit	1998	1
Total number of Grand Prix wins:			54

== See also ==
- List of Grand Prix motorcycle racing winners
- List of MotoGP rider records
