= 1970 French motorcycle Grand Prix =

(France) 1970 French Grand Prix
Race details
- Race 2 of 12 races in the 1970 Grand Prix motorcycle racing season
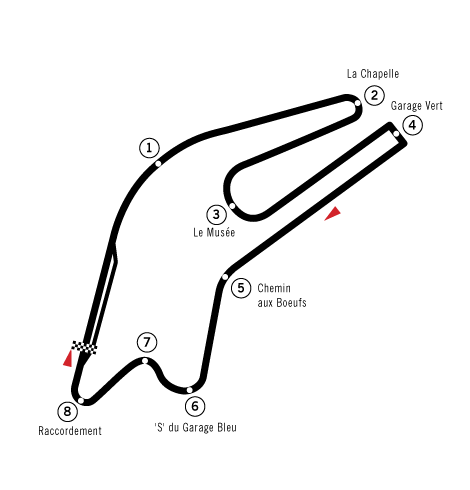
- Date: 17 May 1970
- Official name: Grand Prix de France
- Location: Circuit Bugatti Le Mans
- Course: Permanent racing facility; 4.422 km (2.748 mi)

500cc
Pole position
Rider	(Italy) Giacomo Agostini	MV Agusta
Fastest lap
Rider	(Italy) Giacomo Agostini	MV Agusta
Time	1:54.8	
Podium
First	(Italy) Giacomo Agostini	MV Agusta
Second	(New Zealand) Ginger Molloy	Kawasaki
Third	(Italy) Alberto Pagani	Linto

250cc
Pole position
Rider	(Australia) Kel Carruthers	Yamaha
Fastest lap
Rider	(Spain) Santiago Herrero	Ossa
Time	1:58.1	
Podium
First	(United Kingdom) Rodney Gould	Yamaha
Second	(Spain) Santiago Herrero	Ossa
Third	(Hungary) László Szabó	MZ

125cc
Pole position
Rider	(Spain) Ángel Nieto	Derbi
Fastest lap
Rider	(Spain) Ángel Nieto	Derbi
Time	2:06.5	
Podium
First	(Germany) Dieter Braun	Suzuki
Second	(Sweden) Börje Jansson	Maico
Third	(East Germany) Günter Bartusch	MZ

50cc
Pole position
Rider	(Spain) Ángel Nieto	Derbi
Fastest lap
Rider	(Spain) Ángel Nieto	Derbi
Time	2:17.4	
Podium
First	(Spain) Ángel Nieto	Derbi
Second	(Netherlands) Aalt Toersen	Jamathi
Third	(Germany) Rudolf Kunz	Kreidler

Sidecar (B2A)
Pole position
Rider	(Germany) Klaus Enders	BMW
Passenger	(Germany) Wolfgang Kalauch	
Fastest lap
Rider	(Germany) Klaus Enders	BMW
Passenger	(Germany) Wolfgang Kalauch	
Time	2:04.9	
Podium
First rider	(Germany) Klaus Enders	BMW
First passenger	(Germany) Wolfgang Kalauch	
Second rider	(Germany) Georg Auerbacher	BMW
Second passenger	(Germany) Hermann Hahn	
Third rider	(Germany) Siegfried Schauzu	BMW
Third passenger	(Germany) Horst Schneider	

The 1970 French motorcycle Grand Prix was the second round of the 1970 Grand Prix motorcycle racing season. It took place on 17 May 1970 at the Circuit Bugatti Le Mans.

== 500 cc classification ==
Pos	No.	Rider	Manufacturer	Laps	Time	Grid	Points
1	1	(Italy) Giacomo Agostini	MV Agusta	35	1:09:11.3	1	15
2	16	(New Zealand) Ginger Molloy	Kawasaki	35	+48.2	3	12
3	22	(Italy) Alberto Pagani	Linto	35	+1:00.3	6	10
4	44	(Italy) Angelo Bergamonti	Aermacchi	35	+1:13.8	2	8
5	8	(United Kingdom) Brian Steenson	Seeley	35	+1:37.2	5	6
6	2	(Switzerland) Gyula Marsovsky	Kawasaki	34	+1 lap	9	5
7	5	(United Kingdom) Alan Barnett	Seeley	34	+1 lap	7	4
8	32	(France) Christian Ravel	Kawasaki	34	+1 lap	27	3
9		(France) Eric Offenstadt	Kawasaki	34	+1 lap	23	2
10	38	(France) André-Luc Appietto	Paton	34	+1 lap	4	1
11	21	(United Kingdom) Tommy Robb	Seeley	34	+1 lap	16	
12	19	(United Kingdom) Dave Simmonds	Kawasaki	33	+2 laps	8	
13		(France) Pierre-Louis Tebec	Kawasaki	33	+2 laps	25	
14		(Austria) Werner Bergold	Linto	33	+2 laps	32	
15	35	(France) Hervé Lansac	Kawasaki	33	+2 laps	26	
16	15	(Germany) Karl Hoppe	Münch-URS	32	+3 laps	18	
17		(France) Jean-Claude Costeux	Aermacchi	31	+4 laps	36	
		(Netherlands) Theo Louwes	Kawasaki			10	
		(France) René Guili	Matchless			11	
		(Sweden) Bo Granath	Husqvarna			12	
	11	(Australia) Jack Findlay	Seeley			13	
		(United Kingdom) Terry Dennehy	Drixton-Honda			14	
		(France) Jacques Roca	Suzuki-Métisse			15	
		(Italy) Roberto Gallina	Paton			17	
		(United Kingdom) Billie Nelson	Paton			19	
	41	(Austria) Karl Auer	Matchless			20	
		(France) Didier Dumesnil	Linto			21	
	3	(United Kingdom) Godfrey Nash	Tickle Manx			22	
		(United Kingdom) John Blanchard	Seeley			24	
		(United Kingdom) Lewis Young	Drixton-Honda			28	
		(United States) Marty Lunde	Crescent			29	
		(United Kingdom) John Burgess	Norton			30	
		(New Zealand) Keith Turner	Linto			31	
		(Switzerland) Walter Rungg	Aermacchi			33	
		(France) Jean-Pierre Naudon	Matchless			34	
		(France) Thierry Tchernine	Velocette			35	
		(Algeria) Ali Moulay	Paton			37	
		(United Kingdom) Steve Ellis	Linto			38	

== 250 cc classification ==
Pos	No.	Rider	Manufacturer	Laps	Time	Grid	Points
1	9	(United Kingdom) Rodney Gould	Yamaha	30	1:00:11.0	4	15
2	7	(Spain) Santiago Herrero	Ossa	30	+1:00.0	3	12
3	14	(Hungary) László Szabó	MZ	30	+1:00.9	6	10
4		(Finland) Jarno Saarinen	Yamaha	30	+1:18.3	10	8
5		(Italy) Angelo Bergamonti	Aermacchi	30	+1:30.8	32	6
6		(Sweden) Bo Granath	Yamaha	30	+1:53.2	12	5
7		(Switzerland) Gyula Marsovsky	Yamaha	29	+1 lap	8	4
8		(Netherlands) Cees van Dongen	Yamaha	29	+1 lap	15	3
9	52	(Finland) Seppo Kangasniemi	Yamaha	29	+1 lap	34	2
10	33	(France) Christian Bourgeois	Yamaha	29	+1 lap	19	1
11		(Sweden) Ingemar Larsson	Yamaha	28	+2 laps	20	
12		(Finland) Tepi Länsivuori	Yamaha	28	+2 laps	31	
13		(France) Jean-Claude Costeux	Aermacchi	28	+2 laps	25	
14		(Algeria) Larbi Habbiche	Yamaha	27	+3 laps	38	
15		(France) Gérard Rolland	Ossa	27	+3 laps	23	
16		(France) Christian Ravel	Kawasaki	25	+5 laps	30	
17		(France) Jean Auréal	Yamaha	23	+7 laps	18	
	5	(Australia) Kel Carruthers	Yamaha			1	
	6	(Sweden) Kent Andersson	Yamaha			2	
		(Sweden) Börje Jansson	Yamaha			5	
	15	(Germany) Dieter Braun	MZ			7	
		(Finland) Matti Salonen	Yamaha			9	
		(New Zealand) Ginger Molloy	Bultaco			11	
	10	(East Germany) Günter Bartusch	MZ			13	
		(United Kingdom) Tommy Robb	Shepherd			14	
		(France) Eric Offenstadt	Kawasaki			16	
		(Spain) José Medrano	Bultaco			17	
		(Germany) Klaus Huber	Yamaha			21	
		(Italy) Walter Villa	Villa			22	
		(United Kingdom) Brian Steenson	Aermacchi			24	
		(Netherlands) Theo Louwes	Aermacchi			26	
		(Austria) Heinz Kriwanek	Honda			27	
		(Monaco) Jean-Louis Pasquier	Yamaha			28	
		(France) Michel Rougerie	Honda			29	
		(Germany) Heinrich Rosenbusch	Yamaha			33	
		(France) René Hordelalay	Yamaha			35	
		(United States) Marty Lunde	Yamaha			36	
		(Germany) Tony Gruber	Yamaha			37	

== 125 cc classification ==
Pos	No.	Rider	Manufacturer	Laps	Time	Grid	Points
1	9	(Germany) Dieter Braun	Suzuki	25	54:00.0	2	15
2	5	(Sweden) Börje Jansson	Maico	25	+29.3	3	12
3	6	(East Germany) Günter Bartusch	MZ	25	+29.4	10	10
4	12	(Austria) Heinz Kriwanek	Rotax	25	+3:00.5	14	8
5		(Germany) Tony Gruber	Maico	24	+1 lap	16	6
6	48	(Italy) Eugenio Lazzarini	Morbidelli	24	+1 lap	17	5
7		(Hungary) László Szabó	MZ	24	+1 lap	5	4
8	32	(France) Pierre Viura	Maico	24	+1 lap	7	3
9		(France) Jean Auréal	Yamaha	24	+1 lap	15	2
10		(Finland) Tepi Länsivuori	Yamaha	24	+1 lap	24	1
11		(France) Pierre Audry	Aermacchi	24	+1 lap	19	
12		(Germany) Klaus Huber	Maico	24	+1 lap	29	
13		(Germany) Herbert Mann	MZ	24	+1 lap	18	
14		(Finland) Matti Salonen	Yamaha	23	+2 laps	25	
15		(Switzerland) Hans Greub	Maico	23	+2 laps	36	
16		(Poland) Ryszard Mankiewicz	MZ	23	+2 laps	28	
17		(France) Pierre Blosser	Aermacchi	23	+2 laps	35	
18		(Italy) Walter Villa	Villa	22	+3 laps	13	
19		(Netherlands) Jan de Vries	MZ	22	+3 laps	8	
20		(France) Daniel Crivello	Nougier-Maico	19	+6 laps	22	
	19	(Spain) Ángel Nieto	Derbi			1	
		(Italy) Angelo Bergamonti	Aermacchi			4	
		(United Kingdom) Dave Simmonds	Kawasaki			6	
		(Netherlands) Cees van Dongen	Yamaha			9	
	1	(Australia) John Dodds	Aermacchi			11	
		(Italy) Otello Buscherini	Villa			12	
		(Germany) Manfred Bernsee	Maico			20	
		(Finland) Jarno Saarinen	Puch			21	
		(New Zealand) Ginger Molloy	Bultaco			23	
		(Germany) Günter Fischer	Maico			26	
		(Spain) José Medrano	Bultaco			27	
		(France) Jacques Roca	Derbi			30	
		(France) Thierry Tchernine	Maico			31	
		(France) Etienne Delamarre	Nougier-Maico			32	
		(France) Georges Fougeray	Villa			33	
		(Netherlands) Jan Huberts	MZ			34	
		(France) Claude Benelhadj	Maico			37	
		(France) Michel Rougerie	Maico			38	

== 50 cc classification ==
Pos	No.	Rider	Manufacturer	Laps	Time	Grid	Points
1	4	(Spain) Ángel Nieto	Derbi	15	35:00.6	1	15
2	35	(Netherlands) Aalt Toersen	Jamathi	15	+23.4	7	12
3	7	(Germany) Rudolf Kunz	Kreidler	15	+1:26.1	3	10
4		(Netherlands) Jos Schurgers	Van Veen-Kreidler	15	+1:31.7	9	8
5		(Netherlands) Martin Mijwaart	Jamathi	15	+2:13.9	8	6
6		(Spain) Salvador Cañellas	Derbi	15	+2:18.6	4	5
7		(Spain) Juan Bordons	Derbi	15	+2:26.4	10	4
8	42	(Italy) Eugenio Lazzarini	Morbidelli	14	+1 lap	11	3
9		(Germany) Ludwig Faßbender	Kreidler	14	+1 lap	15	2
10		(Austria) Harald Bartol	Kreidler	14	+1 lap	13	1
11	15	(France) Jacques Roca	Derbi	14	+1 lap	14	
12		(France) André Millard	Kreidler	14	+1 lap	16	
13		(Socialist Federal Republic of Yugoslavia) Adrijan Bernetic	Tomos	14	+1 lap	20	
14		(France) Etienne Delamarre	Kreidler	14	+1 lap	29	
15		(France) Charly Dubois	Guazzoni	14	+1 lap	22	
16		(France) Yves Le Tourmelin	Kreidler	13	+2 laps	21	
17		(France) Jacques Deneux	Kedesuho	13	+2 laps	24	
18		(France) Jean-Claude Cachou	Derbi	13	+2 laps	23	
19		(Switzerland) Bernard Hausel	Kreidler	13	+2 laps	30	
20		(Germany) Gerhard Thurow	Kreidler	12	+3 laps	12	
21		(Switzerland) Pierre Zurcher	Honda	12	+3 laps	28	
22	5	(Netherlands) Jan de Vries	Van Veen-Kreidler	12	+3 laps	5	
23		(Netherlands) Cees van Dongen	Kreidler	12	+3 laps	2	
		(Italy) Gilberto Parlotti	Tomos			6	
		(Germany) Manfred Bernsee	Maico			17	
		(Algeria) Mokhfi Layachi	Guazzoni			18	
		(Monaco) Jean-Louis Pasquier	Derbi			19	
		(France) C. Moreau	Guazzoni			25	
		(France) Pierre Audry	Derbi			26	
		(Italy) Otello Buscherini	Itom			27	
		(Algeria) Ben Layachi	Guazzoni			31	

== Sidecar classification ==
Pos	No.	Rider	Passenger	Manufacturer	Laps	Time	Grid	Points
1	1	(Germany) Klaus Enders	(Germany) Wolfgang Kalauch	BMW	25	52:59.9	1	15
2	3	(Germany) Georg Auerbacher	(Germany) Hermann Hahn	BMW	25	+40.3	2	12
3	4	(Germany) Siegfried Schauzu	(Germany) Horst Schneider	BMW	25	+1:04.4	4	10
4		(Germany) Arsenius Butscher	(Germany) Josef Huber	BMW	24	+1 lap	6	8
5		(Germany) Helmut Lünemann	(Germany) Michael Stockel	BMW	24	+1 lap	12	6
6		(Switzerland) Jean-Claude Castella	(Switzerland) Albert Castella	BMW	23	+2 laps	7	5
7		(France) Joseph Duhem	(France) Pierre Longet	BMW	23	+2 laps	15	4
8		(Germany) Egon Schons	(Germany) Karl Lauterbach	BMW	23	+2 laps	13	3
9		(Germany) Gerhard Müller	(Germany) Willy Buchecker	BMW	22	+3 laps	14	2
10		(Germany) Gustav Pape	(Germany) Franz Kallenberg	BMW	22	+3 laps	10	1
11		(France) André Cailletet	(France) André Mauguier	BMW	22	+3 laps	19	
12		(Finland) Kenneth Calenius	(Finland) Juhani Vesterinen	BMW	22	+3 laps	16	
13		(Switzerland) Claude Lambert	(France) Francis Bourdon	BMW	19	+6 laps	17	
		(Germany) Heinz Luthringshauser	(Germany) Hans-Jürgen Cusnik	BMW			3	
	2	(Germany) Horst Owesle	(Germany) Julius Kremer	Münch-URS			5	
		(Switzerland) Rudi Kurth	(United Kingdom) Dane Rowe	CAT-Crescent			8	
		(Germany) Hermann Binding	(Germany) Helmut Fleck	BMW			9	
		(United Kingdom) Tony Wakefield	(United Kingdom) John Flaxman	BMW			11	
		(France) Georges Dumont	(France) Jean-Claude Bétemps	Honda			18	

Previous race: 1970 German Grand Prix	FIM Grand Prix World Championship; 1970 season	Next race: 1970 Yugoslavian Grand Prix
Previous race: 1969 French Grand Prix	French Grand Prix	Next race: 1971 French Grand Prix
