= List of 500cc/MotoGP race winners (constructors) =

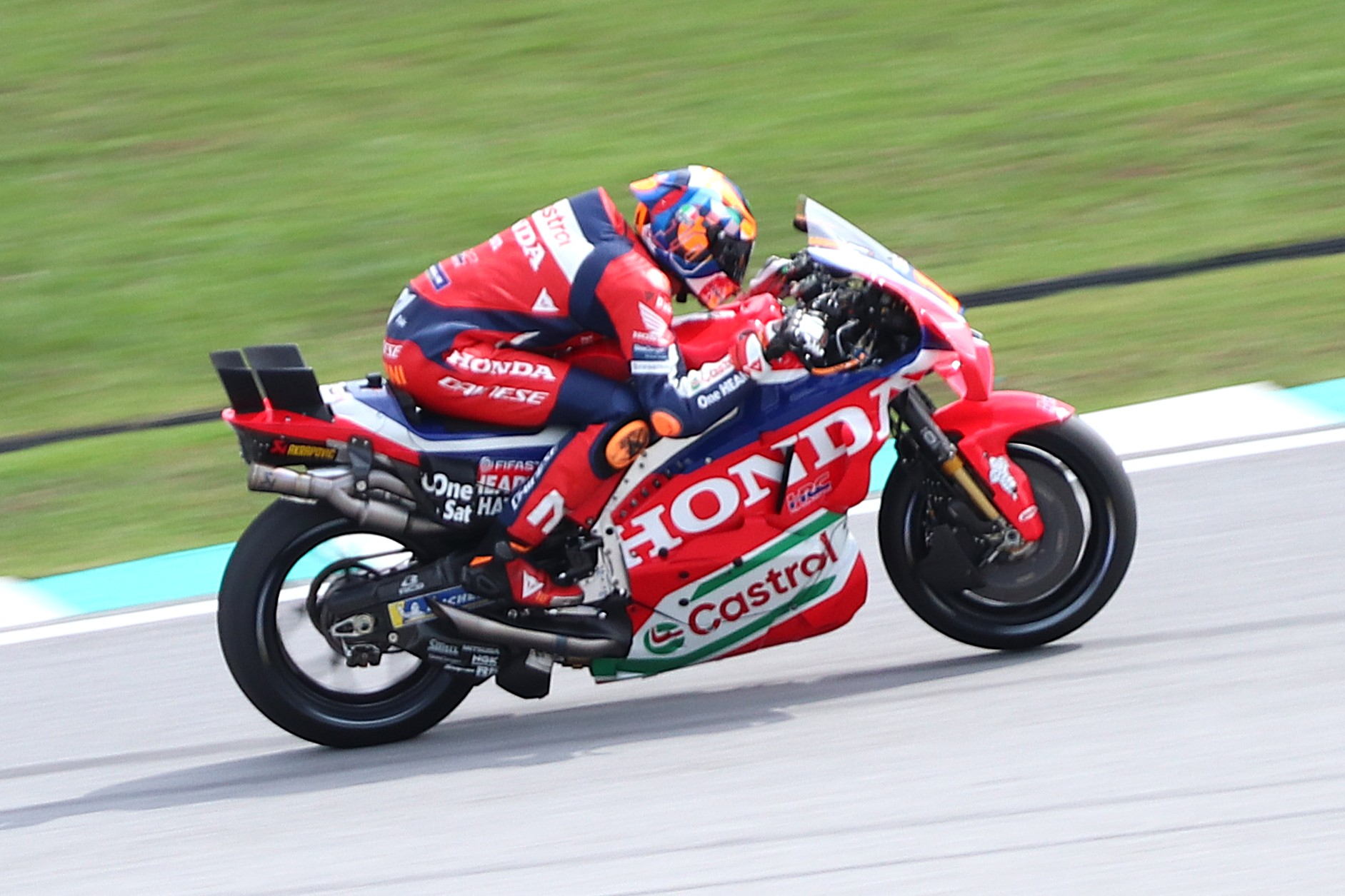
Honda, who has won a record 314 Grand Prix on the premier class.

Grand Prix motorcycle racing is the premier championship of motorcycle road racing, which has been divided into three classes: MotoGP, Moto2, and Moto3. Former classes that have been discontinued include 350cc, 250cc, 125cc, 50cc/80cc, MotoE, and Sidecar. The premier class is MotoGP, which was formerly known as the 500cc class. The Grand Prix Road-Racing World Championship was established in 1949 by the sport's governing body the Fédération Internationale de Motocyclisme (FIM), and is the oldest motorsport world championship in existence. The motorcycles used in MotoGP are purpose-built for the sport, and are unavailable for purchase by the general public because they cannot be legally ridden on public roads.

Honda holds the record for the most Grand Prix victories on the premier class, having won 314 times. Yamaha is second with 245 wins, and MV Agusta is third with 139 wins.

== By constructor ==
As of the 2026 MotoGP Portuguese Grand Prix

Key
*	MotoGP / 500cc World Champion
**Bold**	Constructor has competed in the 2026 MotoGP season

Grand Prix motorcycle racing winners
Rank	Country	Constructor	Wins	Seasons active	First win	Last win
1	JPN	**Honda***	314	1966–1972, 1979–	1966 500cc West German Grand Prix	2025 MotoGP French Grand Prix
2	JPN	**Yamaha***	245	1968–	1972 500cc Spanish Grand Prix	2022 MotoGP German Grand Prix
3	ITA	MV Agusta*	139	1950–1976	1952 500cc Nations Grand Prix	1976 500cc West German Grand Prix
4	ITA	**Ducati***	132	1965, 1968, 1970–1973, 2003–	2003 MotoGP Catalan Grand Prix	2026 MotoGP Malaysian Grand Prix
5	JPN	Suzuki*	97	1971–2011, 2014–2022	1971 500cc Ulster Grand Prix	2022 MotoGP Valencian Grand Prix
6	ITA	Gilera*	35	1949–1965, 1967	1949 500cc Dutch TT	1963 500cc Dutch TT
7	UK	Norton*	21	1949–1972	1949 500cc Isle of Man TT	1969 500cc Yugoslavian Grand Prix
8	ITA	**Aprilia**	18	1994–1997, 1999–2000, 2002–2004, 2015–	2022 MotoGP Argentine Grand Prix	2026 MotoGP Portuguese Grand Prix
9	AUT	**KTM**	8	2016–	2020 MotoGP Czech Republic Grand Prix	2026 MotoGP Austrian Grand Prix
10	UK	AJS*	5	1949–1962, 1964–1966	1949 500cc Swiss Grand Prix	1952 500cc Swiss Grand Prix
11	ITA	Moto Guzzi	3	1949–1958, 1962–1963, 1965, 1967, 1969–1970	1951 500cc Swiss Grand Prix	1955 500cc Ulster Grand Prix
11	UK	Matchless	3	1952–1974	1961 500cc Argentine Grand Prix	1962 500cc Argentine Grand Prix
11	ITA	Cagiva	3	1980–1995	1992 500cc Hungarian Grand Prix	1994 500cc Australian Grand Prix
14	JPN	Kawasaki	2	1969–1975, 1980–1982, 2002–2009	1971 500cc Spanish Grand Prix	1975 500cc Isle of Man TT
15	CZE	Jawa	1	1962–1966, 1968–1970, 1972	1966 500cc East German Grand Prix	1966 500cc East German Grand Prix
15	ITA	Linto	1	1968–1972	1969 500cc Nations Grand Prix	1969 500cc Nations Grand Prix
15	GER	König	1	1971–1976	1973 500cc Yugoslavian Grand Prix	1973 500cc Yugoslavian Grand Prix
15	ITA	Sanvenero	1	1981–1982	1982 500cc French Grand Prix	1982 500cc French Grand Prix

== By nationality ==
As of the 2026 MotoGP Portuguese Grand Prix

Rank	Country	Wins	Constructor(s)
1	Japan	658	4
2	Italy	332	8
3	United Kingdom	29	3
4	Austria	8	1
5	Czech Republic	1	1
5	Germany	1	1
