= Yamaha TD2 =

TD2
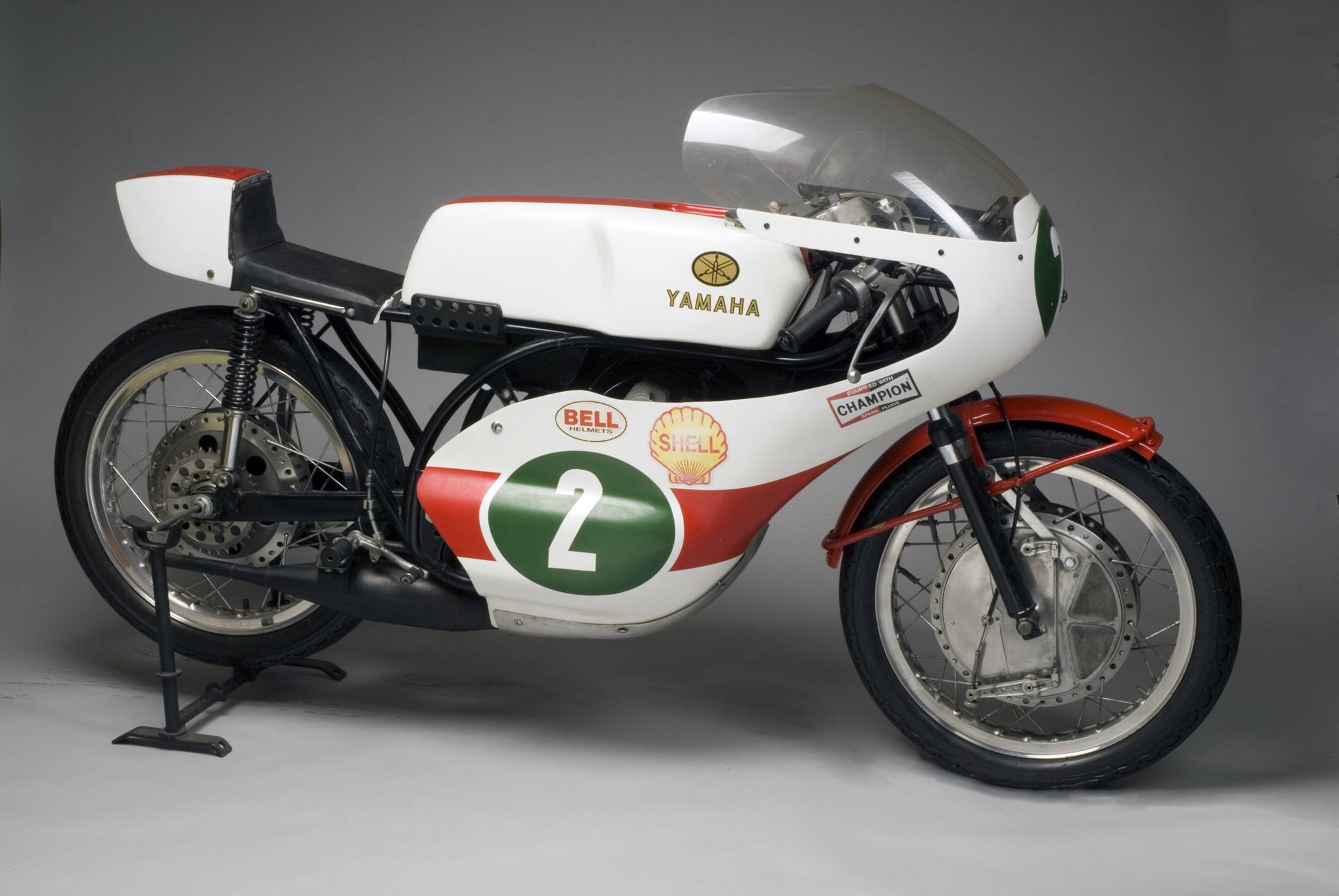
- Manufacturer: Yamaha
- Production: 1969-1970
- Predecessor: TD1C
- Successor: TD2B
- Class: 250 cc
- Engine: 247 cc (15 cu in) DS6 2-stroke, air-cooled, 2 parallel cylinders
- Bore / stroke: 56 mm × 50 mm (2.2 in × 2.0 in)
- Top speed: 144 mph (232 km/h)
- Power: 44 hp (33 kW) @ 10000 rpm
- Torque: 22.9 lb⋅ft (31 N⋅m) @ 9500 rpm
- Transmission: 5-speed
- Suspension: Dual Shock
- Brakes: Front. Internal-expanding dual double leading shoe. Rear. Internal-expanding single leading shoe. Brake operations, both front and rear, cable-actuated
- Tires: Front 2.75 x 18 Rear 3.00 x 18
- Rake, trail: 27.5 Trail 90 mm
- Wheelbase: 1,315 mm
- Dimensions: L: 1,925 mm W: 510 mm
- Weight: 105 kg (231 lb) (dry)
- Fuel capacity: 6 Gallons

Yamaha TD2 is an air-cooled road racing motorcycle made by Yamaha produced between 1969 and 1970. The equivalent 350cc version was called TR2

== Development ==
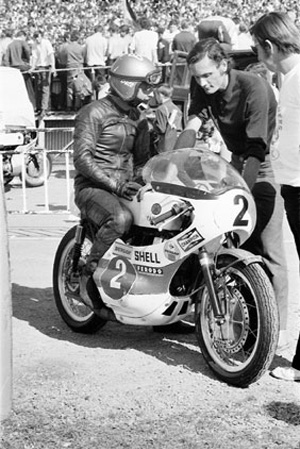
Kel Carruthers, riding a Yamaha TD2 at Mallory Park 1970

The TD1 bikes had a significant impact on British 250cc class racing in the middle-1960s which was historically contested by single-cylinder engines, some with ageing designs. Some TD1s were overbored to 251cc, thus being eligible for the 350cc class

Building on the TD1 successes, the arrival of TD2 together with the TR2 350cc version which could be overbored to around 352cc, making it eligible for the 500cc class, announced the 'death knell' of the traditional 350cc and 500cc class single-cylinder four stroke engines manufactured to 1950s designs

The new over-the-counter Yamahas were smaller, lighter with greater maneuverability and consequently easier braking. The engines were simpler to build - but not significantly easier to maintain as four-stroke singles potentially lasted an entire season - offering a small compact unit without the height associated with overhead valves and camshafts.

Rod Gould's appearance on the European racing scene with TD2 and TR2 machines (and Buco helmets) secured after a business trip to US was a major factor in the change to two-stroke domination. Gould learned his craft initially by campaigning ageing (1950s design) Manx Nortons around the UK short circuits, with 1960s Bultacos and Aermacchis for the smaller classes.

== Racing success ==
Great Britain's Rodney Gould won the 1970 250 cc World Championship on a TD2, with Australian, Kel Carruthers coming in second, also riding a TD2. Gould won six races in the 1970 Grand Prix Motorcycle season, clinching the title at the Nations Grand Prix, Monza.

Yamaha Factory racing had withdrawn from the championship over revised competition rules in 1969. “Privateer” racing with many dealer-backed racing efforts competed against factory teams for the World Championship.

Kel Carruthers won the Isle of Man TT Lightweight 250 cc class in 1970, with a time of 2:21.19 (96.13 mph )

The cost of a TD2 in 1970 was $1,800.

== Yamaha TD3 ==
The TD2 was replaced in model line-up for 1972 by the Yamaha TD3 model, heavily based on the R5 "Street" road bike.

== Specifications ==
Parallel Cylinders

- Bore Stroke: ( 56 mm x 50 mm )
- Compression Ratio: 7.6 : 1
- Ignition: Magneto system
- Clutch: Wet, Multi disk
- Carburetors: Mikuni VM30SC
- top speed:232 km/h
- Wheels: Spoke, Aluminum rims
- Engine model code: DS6-

An oil reservoir was positioned in the tail piece. The oil line was fed to crankcase, powered by a positive placement pump.

TD2 no fairing
