= Keith Turner (motorcyclist) =

New Zealand motorcycle racer (born 1946)

- Nationality: New Zealand
- Born: 11 November 1946 (age 80); London, England
Motorcycle racing career statistics
Grand Prix motorcycle racing
Active years	1967–1972
First race	1967 500cc Isle of Man TT
Last race	1972 500cc Finnish Grand Prix
Starts / Wins / Podiums / Poles / F. laps / Points; 12 / 0 / 3 / N/A / N/A / 75

Keith Turner (born 11 November 1946) is a former Grand Prix motorcycle road racer from New Zealand. He competed in the FIM motorcycle Grand Prix world championships from 1967 to 1972. He had his best season in 1971 when he finished the year in second place in the 500cc world championship, behind the defending champion, Giacomo Agostini.

== Motorcycle racing career ==
Turner was born in London, England, but lived in New Zealand from the age of five. He purchased a Matchless 500 as his first motorcycle at the age of 15. He began motorcycle racing at the age of 16 aboard a BSA A50 while he completed a car mechanic apprenticeship. By 1966, Turner was winning so often aboard a Bultaco 250 that he made the decision to go to Europe to compete in the Grand Prix world championships.

In 1967, Turner entered his first European race in Czechoslovakia, but he crashed his Bultaco 250 while leading in the rain. During the next few seasons, Turner rode one of six specially built 500cc Lintos, which was powered by a pair of 250cc Aermacchi-Harley Davidson four-stroke, single-cylinder engines joined. Despite racing with and leading the reigning world champion, Giacomo Agostini, during the 1968 500cc Finnish Grand Prix, the Lintos were extremely unreliable and Turner rarely finished a race, although he did win the preseason invitational Mettet Grand Prix in 1969. In the 1970 250cc Finnish Grand Prix, he placed fifth aboard a Yamaha TD250.

Turner's most successful world championship season came in 1971, racing on a Suzuki T500 sponsored by Rod Coleman, the first New Zealand competitor to win an Isle of Man TT race. Turner would serve as his own mechanic. He started the season finishing second to Agostini in the Austrian Grand Prix held at the Salzburgring circuit but then crashed while in second behind Agostini at the West German Grand Prix held at the challenging Nürburgring circuit. His Suzuki suffered mechanical difficulties at the Isle of Man TT resulting in a seventh-place finish. At the Dutch TT, he made a poor start but recovered to finish the race in fourth place. After retiring from the Belgian Grand Prix with an engine failure he rebounded to score to consecutive second-place finishes behind Agostini at the East German and Swedish Grand Prix races. He was in second place at the Finnish Grand Prix when an engine misfire forced him back to fourth place. He ended the season with a sixth place in Italy and a fifth place in Spain to secure second place in the 500cc world championship, just one point ahead of Rob Bron, also riding a Suzuki T500. New Zealand road racers had a string of second placings in the premier class – Ginger Molloy in 1970, Turner in 1971 and Kim Newcombe in 1973.

Turner suffered through numerous mechanical problems in 1972 causing him to become disillusioned with racing in Europe and decided to return to New Zealand. After racing motorcycles for a few more years and operating a motorcycle business, he retired in Rotorua, New Zealand.

== Grand Prix motorcycle racing results ==
Points system from 1950 to 1968:

**Position**	1	2	3	4	5	6
**Points**	8	6	4	3	2	1

Points system from 1969 onwards:

**Position**	1	2	3	4	5	6	7	8	9	10
**Points**	15	12	10	8	6	5	4	3	2	1

(key) (Races in bold indicate pole position; races in italics indicate fastest lap)

Year	Class	Team	1	2	3	4	5	6	7	8	9	10	11	12	13	Points	Rank	Wins
1967	250cc	Bultaco	ESP -	GER -	FRA -	IOM -	NED -	BEL -	DDR; 10	CZE -	FIN -	ULS -	NAT -	CAN -	JPN -	0	–	0
1967	500cc	Matchless		GER -		IOM; 24	NED -		DDR; 13	CZE -	FIN; 8	ULS -	NAT -		JPN -	0	33rd	0
1968	250cc	Aermacchi	GER; 11	ESP -	IOM; RET	NED -	BEL -	DDR -	CZE; 11	FIN; RET	ULS -	NAT -				0	–	0
1968	500cc	Matchless	GER; 15	ESP -	IOM; 10	NED; RET	BEL -	DDR; 8	CZE; RET	FIN; RET	ULS; 6	NAT; 6				0	33rd	0
1969	250cc	Aermacchi	ESP -	GER -	FRA -	IOM -	NED -	BEL -	DDR; 9	CZE -	FIN -	ULS -	NAT -	YUG -		2	45th	0
1969	500cc	Linto	ESP; RET	GER -	FRA; RET	IOM -	NED; 11	BEL -	DDR; RET	CZE -	FIN; RET	ULS -	NAT; RET	YUG; 5		6	36th	0
1970	250cc	Yamaha	GER -	FRA -	YUG -	IOM -	NED -	BEL -	DDR -	CZE -	FIN; 5	ULS -	NAT -	ESP -		6	28th	0
1970	500cc	Linto	GER -	FRA; RET	YUG -	IOM -	NED -	BEL -	DDR -		FIN; RET	ULS; RET	NAT -	ESP -		0	-	0
1971	350cc	Yamaha	AUT -	GER -	IOM -	NED -		DDR -	CZE -	SWE -	FIN -	ULS -	NAT; 8	ESP -		3	40th	0
1971	500cc	Suzuki	AUT; 2	GER; RET	IOM; 7	NED; 4	BEL; RET	DDR; 2		SWE; 2	FIN; 4	ULS; RET	NAT; 6	ESP; 5		58	2nd	0
1972	500cc	Suzuki	GER; 13	FRA; RET	AUT -	NAT; RET	IOM -	YUG; RET	NED; RET	BEL; RET	DDR; RET	CZE; RET	SWE; RET	FIN; RET	ESP -	0	67th	0
