= Honda XL185 =

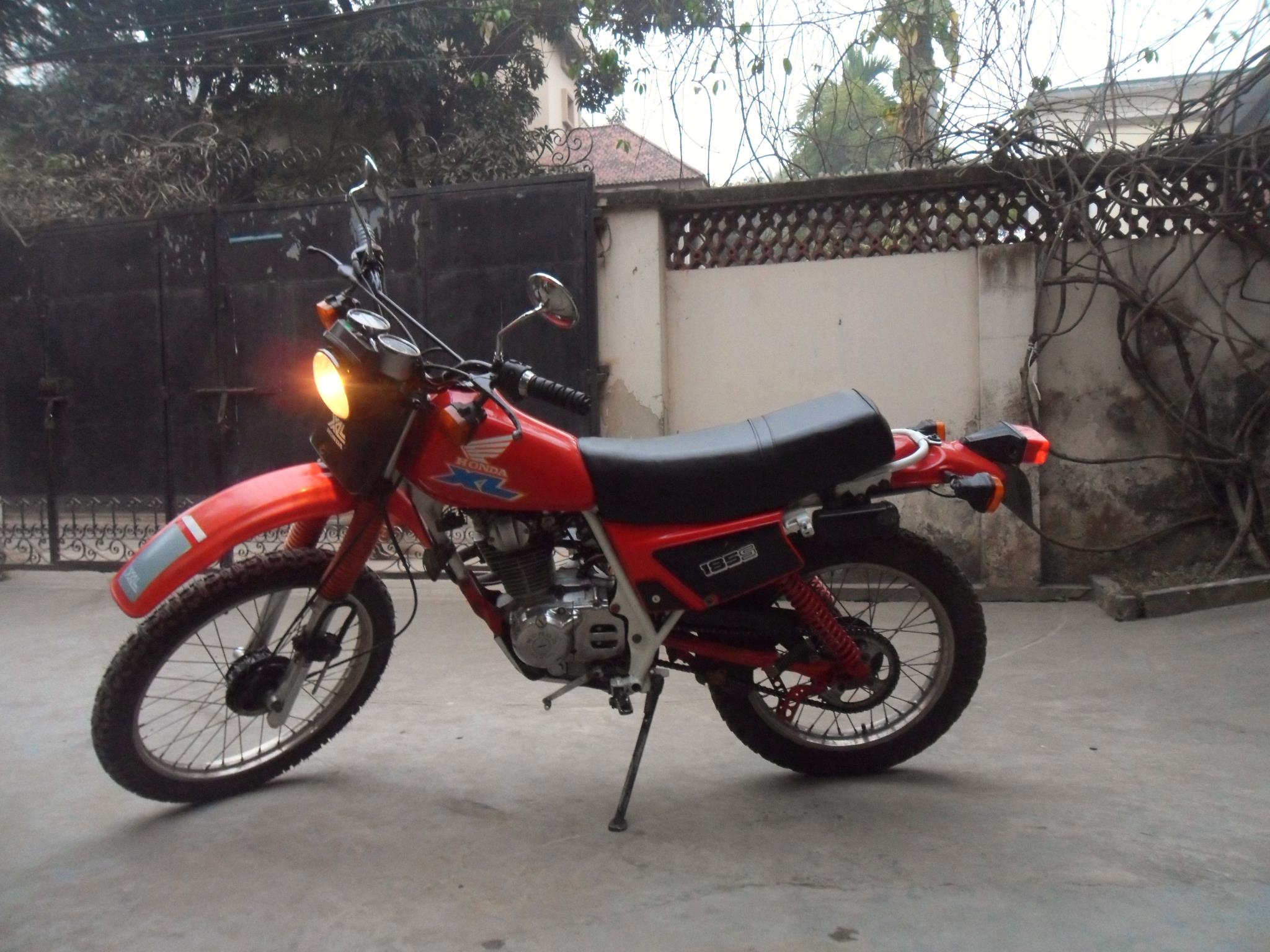
- Honda XL185 (1985 model)
- Manufacturer: Honda
- Parent company: Honda
- Production: 1979 to 1999
- Predecessor: Honda XL175
- Class: dual-sport motorcycle
- Engine: 180 cc, four-stroke, air-cooled, single-cylinder
- Top speed: 71mph (115 km/h)
- Power: 16 HP
- Ignition type: Capacitor discharge ignition
- Transmission: 5-speed manual
- Suspension: telescopic suspension
- Brakes: drum (both)
- Fuel capacity: 1.85 Gallons (7 litres)

Honda XL185 is a dual-sport motorcycle produced by Honda. It is an updated version of Honda XL175. It has a 180 cc, four-stroke, SOHC engine. Instrument gauge contains speedometer, odometer, and resettable tripmeter.

Mechanically, its engine is similar to Honda ATC 185 ATV. This engine was used as a basis for the version supplied by Honda RSC to Colin Seeley for the hand-built Seeley TL200 trials bike.

The motorcycle has a compression release, also called a decompressor valve, which is connected to the kick starter with a cable, to ease starting.
