= Angelo Bergamonti =

Italian motorcycle racer (1939–1971)

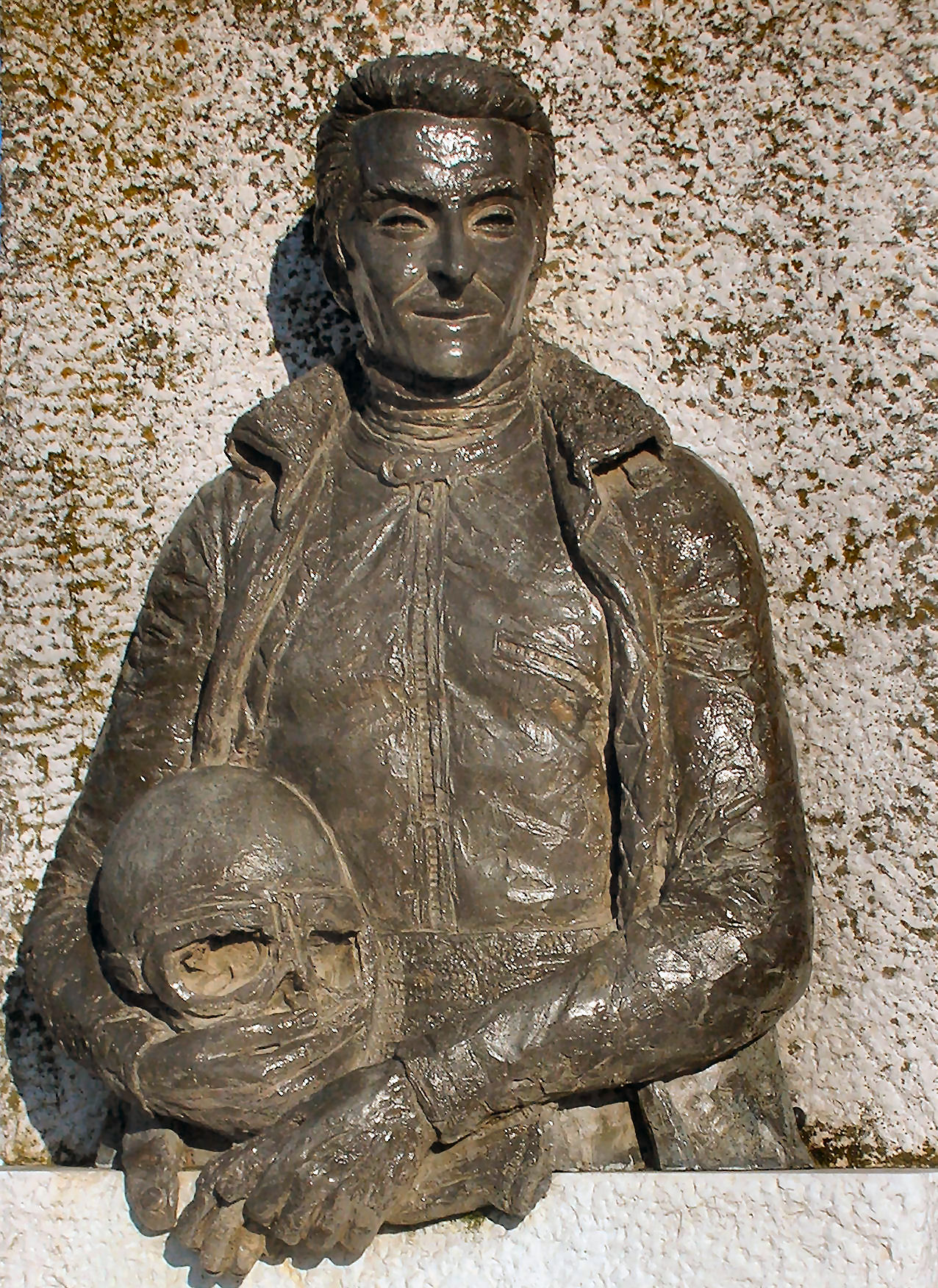
- Statue of Bergamonti in Gussola
- Nationality: Italian
Motorcycle racing career statistics
Grand Prix motorcycle racing
Active years	1967 - 1970
First race	1967 500cc Nations Grand Prix
Last race	1970 500cc Spanish Grand Prix
First win	1970 350cc Spanish Grand Prix
Last win	1970 500cc Spanish Grand Prix
Team	MV Agusta
Starts / Wins / Podiums / Poles / F. laps / Points; 15 / 2 / 10 / 0 / 0 / 136

Angelo Bergamonti (18 March 1939 - 4 April 1971) was an Italian Grand Prix motorcycle road racer.

Bergamonti was born in Gussola. His best year was in 1970 when he finished third in the 500cc world championship, behind his MV Agusta teammate Giacomo Agostini and Ginger Molloy. Bergamonti was killed in 1971 during a race held on the city streets of Riccione.
