= Colin Seeley =

British motorcycle racer (1936–2020)

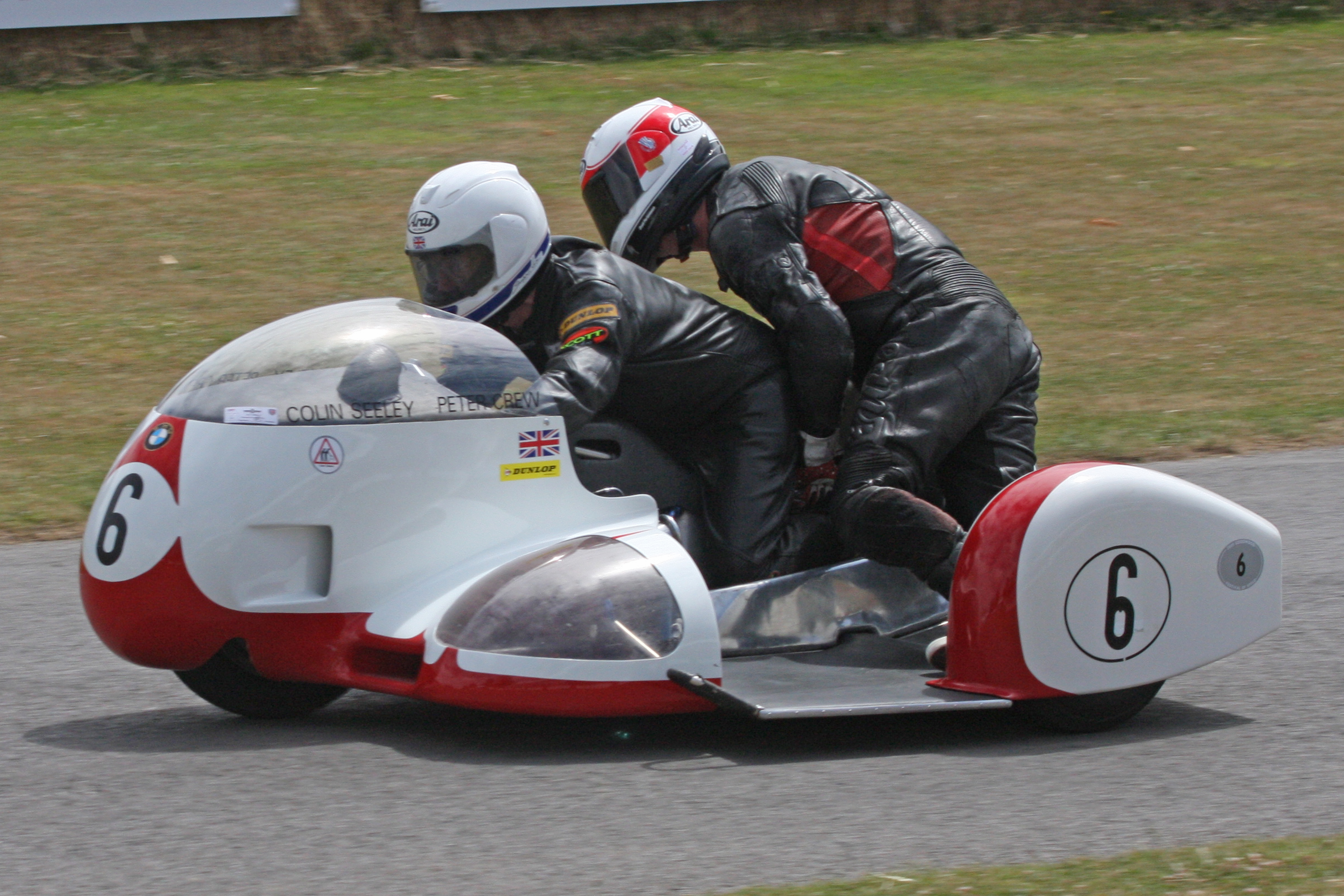

Colin Jordan Seeley (2 January 1936 – 7 January 2020) was a British motorcycle retailer who later became a motorcycle sidecar racer, motorcycle designer, constructor and retailer of accessories. In 1992, he was involved in running the Norton Rotary race team.

== Early days ==
Seeley was born in Crayford, Kent. He left school at fourteen and started riding on his handyman-father Percy's Vincent Rapide when he obtained his licence at sixteen, beginning his working motorcycle career as an apprentice for Harcourt Motorcycles, becoming acquainted with Bernie Ecclestone at his nearby used motorcycle salesroom, followed by Halfords motorists' shop, both in Bexleyheath, Kent, and then as a mechanic for a driving school where Seeley also learned to drive a car. Another move was to the Schwieso Brothers bike business in Dartford, Kent where he gained experience working with many different marques, also repairing and maintaining bikes in his spare time working in a wooden shed at his parents' home, using his bedroom to store parts.

In 1954, after being rejected for National Service as unfit, Seeley had aspirations to own his own motorcycle business, securing rented premises in the Old Forge, a car garage at Stapley Road in Belvedere, Kent. Whilst his father Percy had progressed from Series A Rapide through Series C Shadow to a Black Lightning, Colin was using a Matchless V-twin sidevalve with a large box sidecar to transport motorcycles sign-written with advertising for his business.

In 1956, Seeley established his first retail shop in nearby Nuxley Road, where, with his father Percy, they traded as C.J.Seeley (Sales) Ltd., Motorcycle Specialist, keeping the Old Forge site for service and repairs.

As agencies were difficult to obtain, Seeley started with sub-agencies (under the main-dealer umbrella) from Zündapp, NSU and Moto Rumi, also selling bicycles, clothing and accessories, later being appointed as main agents for AJS, Ariel, BMW, Francis-Barnett, Greeves and Matchless. Further expansion in 1958 saw a nearby new showroom, again in Nuxley Road, dedicated to selling and fitting sidecars.

== Racing background ==
When Seeley was fourteen he would cycle to the nearest local race track, Brands Hatch, which had then converted from grass track to hard surface, where he was impressed by Vincent Motorcycles employee Ted Davis racing his Vincent sidecar outfit.

Seeley entered his first race in 1954 at Brands Hatch, a one-hour endurance event, riding a solo 500 cc BSA Star Twin borrowed from a friend, where he completed 42 laps during the hour. Pressure of work prevented any further competition until 1957 when Seeley entered his first scramble on a part-exchanged Triumph twin, followed by grass track, hill climb and Ramsgate sprint using the same machine.

By 1958, Seeley had acquired an AJS agency and purchased an ex-works 500 cc scrambler which he was uneasy with; also holding a Greeves agency, Seeley approached the factory for support and rode scramblers for them in 1958 and 1959.

In 1960, Seeley with his friend – mechanic and employee Wally Rawlings – bought their first sidecar outfit, and ex-Eric Oliver machine based on a Manx Norton, entering their first race at Snetterton in April 1960. With only one other entry accepted during 1960 – at Charterhall in Scotland, 400 miles from his base in Kent – Seeley was disillusioned with the race-regulating bodies.

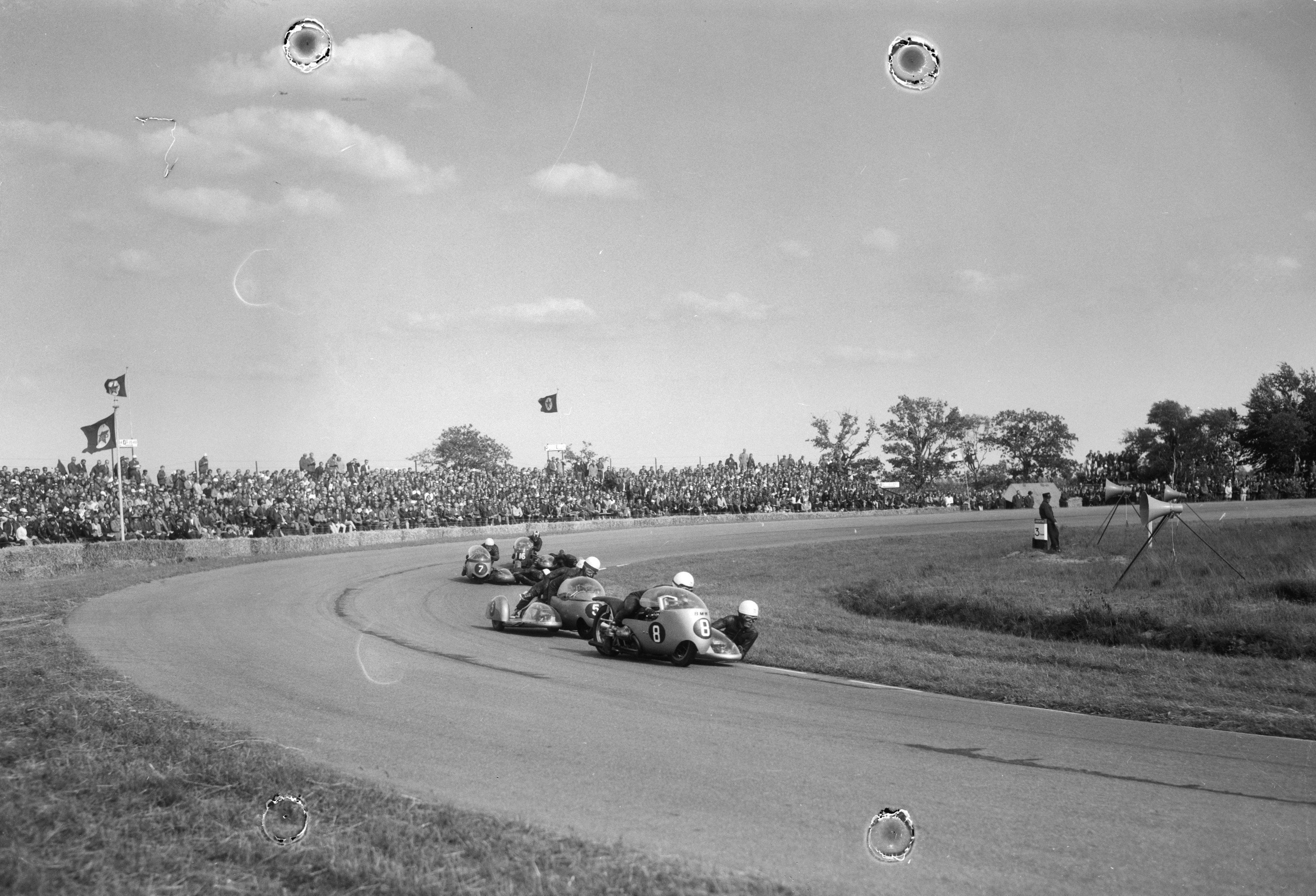
Seeley (8) leads George Auerbacher (5) during the 1965 Sidecar Dutch TT.

In late 1960, as a rider-agent, Seeley managed to convince the AMC factory to sell him a new Matchless G50 solo race bike to be modified and used with a Canterbury racing sidecar, for which Seeley was an agent. After some encouraging results on local tracks, Seeley entered his first Grand Prix event, the Isle of Man TT in 1961, finishing in sixth place.

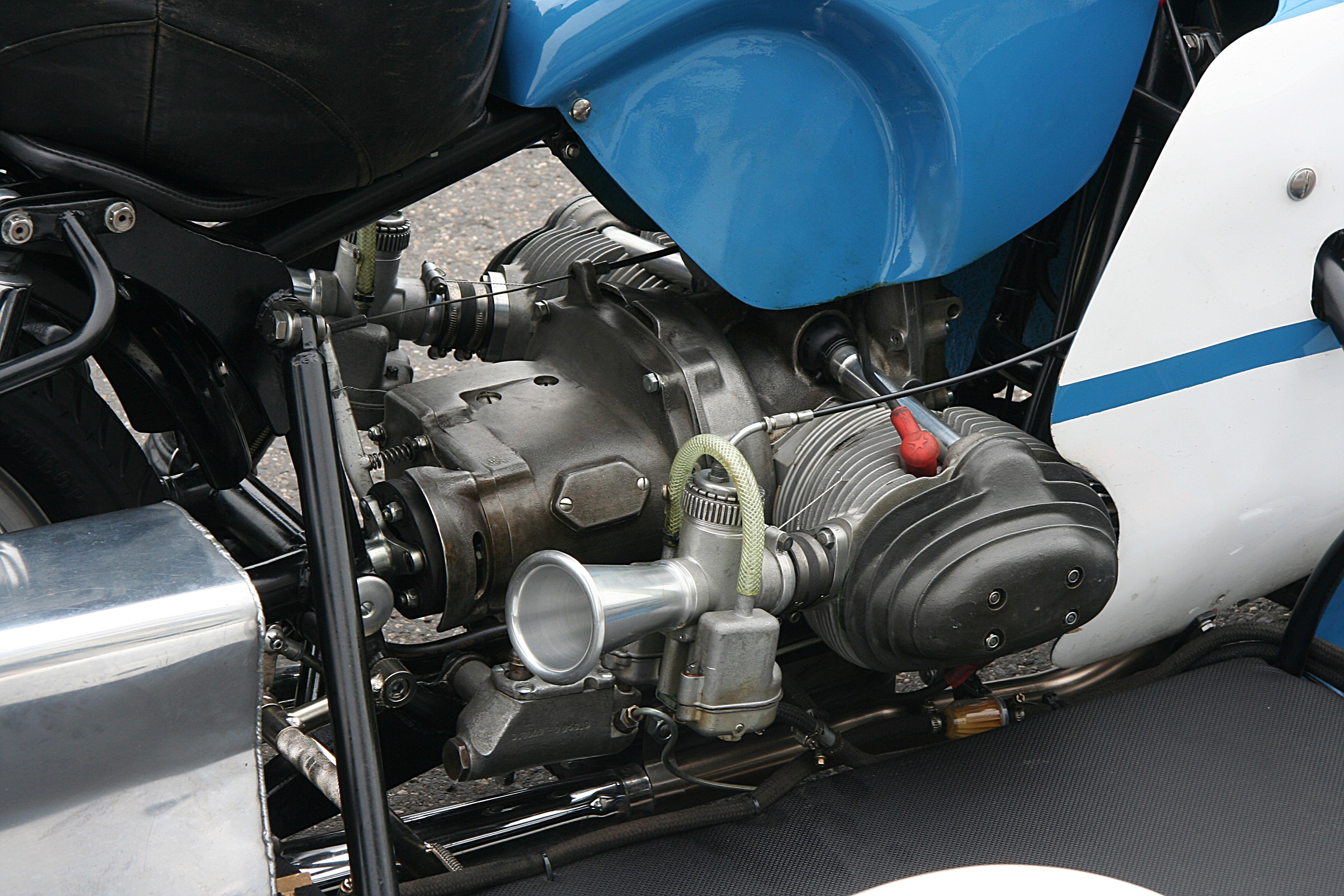
BMW RS54 Rennsport 500cc engine showing low flat-twin design, camshaft drive, Dell'Orto carburettors and gearbox output coupling to shaft final drive

Seeley raced in the British and world championship sidecar competitions between 1961 and 1967. He raced his own-design machines with Matchless G50 500cc engines and for the UK large-capacity class Matchless 650cc G12 CSR followed by Norton 650cc Dominator engines prepared by Paul Dunstall, but for Grands Prix the size limit was 500cc, meaning the only reliable, competitive engine was the BMW RS54 Rennsport.

Abandoning the tall-engine configuration of the single-cylinder Matchless G50 outfit, Seeley campaigned the flat-twin BMW installed in a lower-line outfit called FCS-BMW(Fath-Camathias Special). His best competitive results were first place at the 1964 Dutch TT and second-place finishes in the sidecar competitions at the 1964 Isle of Man TT and the 1966 French Grand Prix at Clermont-Ferrand. Seeley was one of the first to wear coloured racing leathers, using red suits together with passenger Roy Lindsay during the 1967 season, a trend started in 1966 by Derek Minter.

== Seeley motorcycles ==
=== Development ===
After retiring from competition, Seeley concentrated his efforts on designing and constructing Seeley-framed racing motorcycles, initially powered by AJS and Matchless motorcycle engines.

After experimentation during the winter months, the first prototype frame - powered by a Matchless G50 single-cylinder 500 cc engine - was built from Reynolds '531' tubing in early 1966, and was 9 lbs lighter than a standard G50 frame. The prototype had Manx Norton front forks with an eight-inch dual-sided brake by engineer Edwin 'Eddie' Robinson, which Seeley later retailed separately and Manx Norton rear forks (swinging arm, swingarm) with Manx conical rear hub.

Production frames would have a swinging arm made by Seeley, and customers could specify four, five or six-speed gearboxes.

Derek Minter tested the bike at a race circuit local to both himself and Colin Seeley – Brands Hatch – describing it as "the best steering solo he'd ever tried" and the front brake as better than the Oldani normally used on his Manx Nortons.

When the AMC motorcycle firm closed their in-house race shops in 1963 due to financial problems, although spares were still available, the actual engines were then obsolete.

There were no manufacturers producing new 350 cc and 500 cc race machines for purchase, excepting a 350 cc Aermacchi, prompting fears over sustainability of the existing AMC race engines and leading some tuners to turn to developing road engines, such as Triumph Tiger 100 used in the lightweight composite-framed 'Monard' by Geoff Monty and Allen Dudley-Ward, Allen Dudley-Ward's own 'DWS 500' (a Triumph Norton) and Brian Bennett's twin-carb all-Triumph). Although these were not expected to be fully competitive against the OHC AMC race engines, they were a cheaper clubman's starter option.

Seeley in late 1966 purchased all the engine tooling and spares for their racing AJS, Matchless and Norton motorcycle brands. The availability of AJS 7R and Matchless G50 engines was ensured, and Seeley did not have to consider manufacturing the AJS and Matchless cycle parts. The Manx Norton spares aspect was sold-on to former sidecar racer John Tickle in 1969, changing hands twice again by 1994.

=== Production ===
Production began in July 1966, with the first available G50 500 cc bike being purchased by Swiss racer Ernst Weiss. David Dixon track-tested the 350cc AJS 7R-engined version for Motor Cycle albeit hampered by the chassis being fitted for smaller Derek Minter and running-in a new engine, he reported the bike – with a six-speed Schafleitner gearbox – to be the smoothest 7R he'd ridden. Dixon also reported that there was two gearbox options - four-speed or six-speed at extra cost.

Motor Cycle staff writer David Dixon reported in November 1966 that Seeley was "hoping to step-up the output of his Seeley 349 cc AJSs and 549 cc Matchlesses for 1967. These will, as in the past, be sold as complete machines ready to race." Seeley was also appointed as a Reynolds 531 frame tubing stockist.

Seeley soon was devising frames for other engines. The 1967 URS 500 cc four cylinder intended for Grands Prix racing was initially ridden by John Blanchard, but the Seeley-frame aspect of the project (provided by Colin Seeley Race Developments) ran into problems with personalities and by the sudden use of a non-Seeley front-brake from rival Rickman Brothers, resulting in Colin Seeley confiscating his rolling chassis less the brake, caused the Fath (URS) team to use a Rickman Metisse frame from 1968 onwards, a successful Grands Prix machine campaigned by German Karl Hoppe. Colin Seeley later sold the frame privately, which Blanchard eventually bought, and using a spare Fath/URS engine was able to create a complete machine.

In 1968, Seeley developed road-race frames for the 250 cc QUB two-stroke twin-cylinder, followed by the 500 cc QUB two-stroke single-cylinder engines, both conceived by Dr. Gordon Blair at Queen's University Belfast.

Other engines were Yamaha, creating the Yamsel so effectively raced by John Cooper and later Norton twins. Seeley went on to develop in 1971 a roadster based on the Matchless G50 engine called the Seeley Condor.

During the late 1960s and early 1970s when almost all the major motorcycle manufacturers had pulled out of Grand Prix racing, the Seeley-designed chassis became the race bike of choice for privateer racers of the era. John Cooper won the 500cc class at the 1968 North West 200, while Brian Ball finished second to Giacomo Agostini in the Senior TT at the 1968 Isle of Man TT, both riders on a Seeley-Matchless. At the 1969 North West 200, John Blanchard and Brian Steenson placed first and second in the 500 class aboard Seeley-designed motorcycles. In the 1969 Isle of Man TT, Seeley placed four of his machines in the top ten in the Senior TT race with third, fourth, sixth and seventh-place finishes. His best result as a constructor came in 1970 when Tommy Robb rode one of his machines to a fourth-place finish in the 500cc world championship. Seeley later used other Japanese engines in his chassis, most notably using a Hi-Tac Suzuki T500 engine for Barry Sheene in 1971. Sheene used the bike to win the British national championship and declared it the best-handling motorcycle he had ever ridden.

Seeley's designs proved so successful in competition that he earned a reputation as one of the best motorcycle frame designers in the industry. In the 1970s, Seeley moved to automobile racing when Bernie Ecclestone hired him as joint managing director of Motor Racing Developments to work on Brabham racing car production, and in 1986 with the Brabham Formula One team.

=== Road bikes and others ===
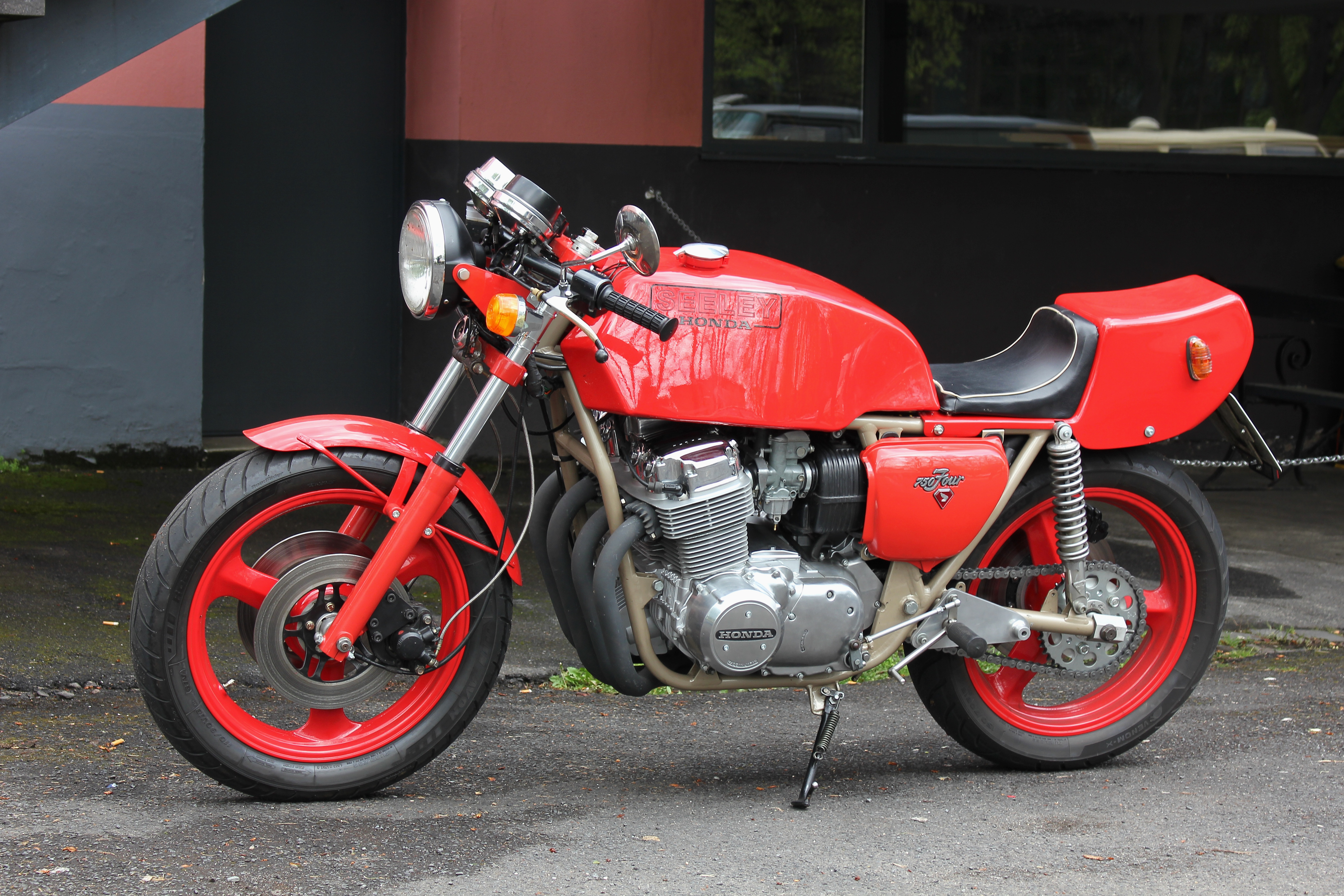
Seeley Honda (1977)

Following on from the Condor roadster, during the mid-1970s Seeley - under the name Colin Seeley International - produced a special, lightweight, single-seat sporting road bike with Honda CB750 750 cc SOHC engine and front forks, featuring his own fuel tank, seat and exhausts.

Additionally, the frame and swinging-arm was available separately as a kit for self-builders having the Honda 750 engine and ancillaries. Seeley was the UK-importer for American-made Lester aluminium motorcycle wheels.

In 1977, Seeley produced for Honda a limited-production of 150 'Phil Read Replica' TT Formula 1 race-styled roadsters based on the CB750F2 with accessories by Seeley in Honda Britain colours of blue and red, followed by a 1979 updated version called CB750SS in white with red or blue flashes.

Again in 1979, he produced a Seeley Honda TL200 trials bike, a smaller version of the 360cc works bike ridden by Rob Shepherd, based on the XL185 engine with a Reynolds 531 tubing frame, Marzocchi forks and Girling rear shock absorbers. All machines were hand-built, by David Carter in Seeley's workshop in Maxim Road Erith and, with limited production volumes, have become collector's items.

Other product lines were developed. Seeley fairings were instantly recognisable by the styling and twin headlights, as were megaphone-shape replacement silencers with long reverse-cones which he dubbed Easy-Fit.

As vintage racing increased in popularity, Seeley's motorcycles experienced a resurgence with a victory at the 1988 Manx Grand Prix. Since then, Seeley machines have won twelve times in vintage class racing at the Manx Grand Prix.

== Charity work ==
In 1976, Seeley's first wife Joan was diagnosed with cancer which ultimately proved to be terminal; in her memory, Seeley established a small charity named The Joan Seeley Pain Relief Memorial Trust. Originally administered by a small team of trustees who died or retired, Seeley and his second wife Eva later ran the charity, from which they took no expenses, with all the monies raised being invested into equipment for hospital facilities. Past patrons include Murray Walker and Mike Hailwood, who was succeeded after his death in 1981 by his widow Pauline.
