= Rodney Gould (motorcyclist) =

British motorcycle racer (1941–2024)

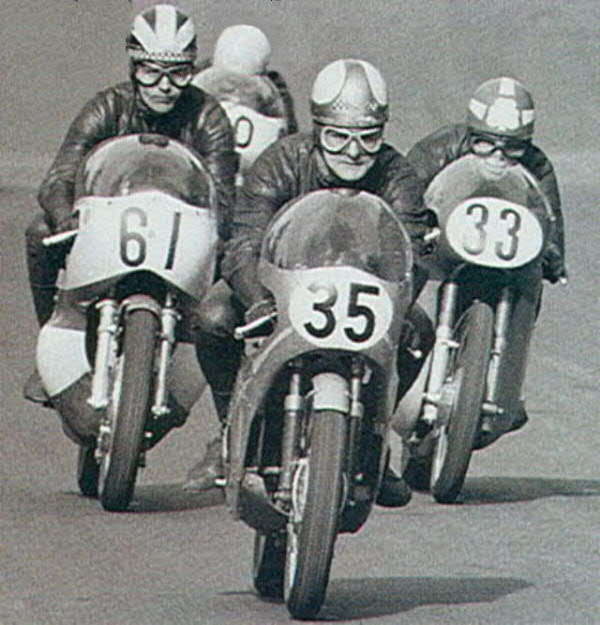
- Gould on a 250 Bultaco 33 close behind Phil Read 61 following Mike Hailwood 35, around 1967 at Cadwell Park
- Nationality: British
- Born: 10 March 1943; Banbury, England
- Died: 16 April 2024 (aged 81); Cheltenham, England
Motorcycle racing career statistics
Grand Prix motorcycle racing
Active years	1967 – 1972
First race	1967 500cc East German Grand Prix
Last race	1972 500cc Finnish Grand Prix
First win	1970 250cc French Grand Prix
Last win	1972 250cc Swedish Grand Prix
Team	Yamaha
Championships	250cc – 1970
Starts / Wins / Podiums / Poles / F. laps / Points; 54 / 10 / 34 / 0 / 8 / 468

Rodney Gould (10 March 1943 – 16 April 2024) was a British Grand Prix motorcycle road racer and UK short circuit specialist.

Gould began racing in 1961 and made his first Isle of Man TT appearance in 1967. He rode a variety of machines including Manx Nortons and two-stroke Bultacos for the smaller classes, and was supported by UK Aermacchi concessionaire Syd Lawton from 1966, before turning to Yamaha TD2s and TR2s.

Gould won the 1970 FIM 250cc world championship on a Yamaha. After finishing third in the 250 class and fourth in the 500 class in 1972, Gould retired from competition and took a position as Yamaha's European racing manager.

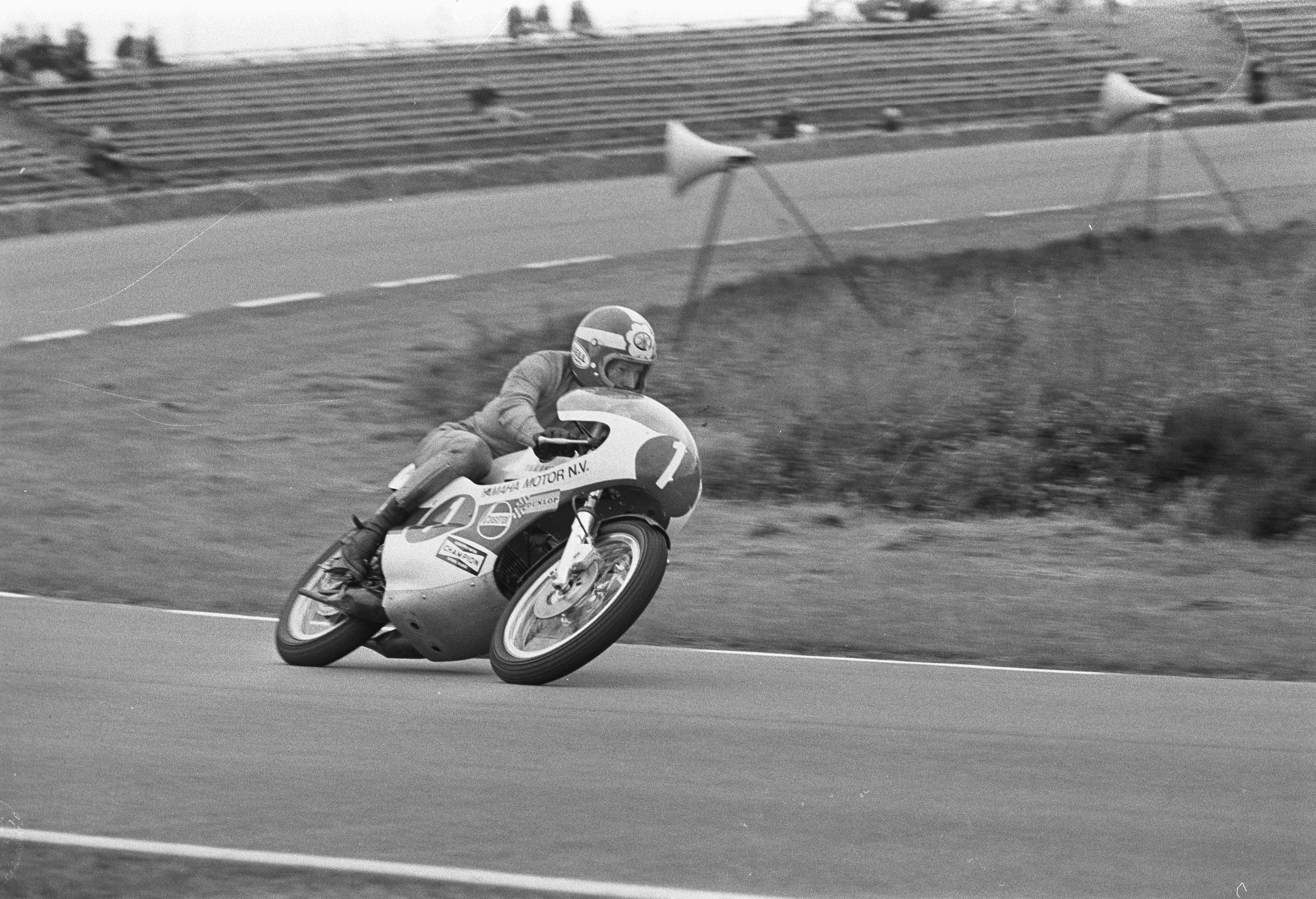
Gould in action during the 1971 250cc Dutch TT.

In 1979, Gould established a retail motorcycle dealership in Birmingham named Hailwood and Gould, in partnership with famous former-racer Mike Hailwood, who was subsequently killed in a road traffic accident in 1981. In 1984, Gould was briefly Sales Manager for the second incarnation of Hesketh Motorcycles based at Lord Hesketh's Easton Neston stately home.

Gould died at his home in Cheltenham on 16 April 2024, at the age of 81.

== Motorcycle Grand Prix results ==
Points system from 1950 to 1968:

**Position**	1	2	3	4	5	6
**Points**	8	6	4	3	2	1

Points system from 1969 onwards:

**Position**	1	2	3	4	5	6	7	8	9	10
**Points**	15	12	10	8	6	5	4	3	2	1

(key) (Races in bold indicate pole position; races in italics indicate fastest lap)

Year	Class	Team	1	2	3	4	5	6	7	8	9	10	11	12	13	Points	Rank	Wins
1967	350cc	AJS	GER -	IOM; NC	NED -		DDR -	CZE -		ULS -	NAT -		JPN -			0	–	0
1967	500cc	Norton	GER -	IOM; NC	NED -	BEL -	DDR; 5	CZE -	FIN -	ULS -	NAT -	CAN -				2	19th	0
1968	250cc	Yamaha	GER; 4	ESP -	IOM; 5	NED; 5		DDR; 4	CZE; 4	FIN; 3	ULS; 3	NAT -				21	4th	0
1968	250cc	Kawasaki					BEL; 3									21	4th	0
1968	500cc	Norton	GER; 6	ESP -	IOM; NC	NED -	BEL -	DDR -	CZE -	FIN -	ULS -	NAT -				1	24th	0
1969	250cc	Yamaha	ESP -	GER -	FRA; 2	IOM; NC	NED; 4	BEL; 2	DDR -	CZE; 2	FIN -	ULS -	NAT -	YUG -		44	6th	0
1969	350cc	Yamaha	ESP -	GER -		IOM; NC	NED -		DDR; 2	CZE; 2	FIN; 2	ULS -	NAT -	YUG -		36	5th	0
1970	250cc	Yamaha	GER -	FRA; 1	YUG; 3	IOM; 2	NED; 1	BEL; 1	DDR; 1	CZE -	FIN; 1	ULS; 2	NAT; 1	ESP -		102	**1st**	6
1970	350cc	Yamaha	GER -		YUG; 5	IOM; NC	NED -		DDR -	CZE -	FIN; 3	ULS -	NAT -	ESP; 2		28	6th	0
1971	125cc	Yamaha	AUT -	GER -	IOM -	NED -	BEL; 7	DDR -	CZE -	SWE -	FIN -		NAT -	ESP -		4	24th	0
1971	250cc	Yamaha	AUT -	GER -	IOM; 4	NED -	BEL; 6	DDR; 2	CZE -	SWE; 1	FIN; 1	ULS; 6	NAT; 4	ESP -		68	**2nd**	2
1971	350cc	Yamaha	AUT -	GER -	IOM; NC	NED; 4		DDR -	CZE -	SWE; 4	FIN -	ULS -	NAT -	ESP -		16	13th	0
1972	250cc	Yamaha	GER; 6	FRA -	AUT -	NAT; 2	IOM; 2	YUG; 2	NED; 1	BEL; 2	DDR; 3	CZE; 4	SWE; 1	FIN -	ESP -	88	**3rd**	2
1972	350cc	Yamaha	GER -	FRA -	AUT -	NAT; 6	IOM; NC	YUG -	NED -		DDR -	CZE -	SWE -	FIN -	ESP -	6	25th	0
1972	500cc	Yamaha	GER -	FRA -	AUT -	NAT -	IOM -	YUG -	NED -	BEL; 3	DDR; 2	CZE; 4	SWE; 2	FIN; 3	ESP -	52	4th	0
