= Rudolf Kunz =

German motorcycle racer

- Nationality: German
Motorcycle racing career statistics
Grand Prix motorcycle racing
Active years	1964, 1968 - 1977
First race	1964 50 cc Belgian Grand Prix
Last race	1977 80 cc Yugoslavian Grand Prix
Team	Kreidler
Starts / Wins / Podiums / Poles / F. laps / Points; 64 / 0 / 20 / N/A / N/A / 374

Rudolf Kunz was a German former professional motorcycle road racer. He competed in Grand Prix motorcycle racing from 1964 to 1977.

In 1965, Kunz set a land speed record of 210.634 km/h (130.882 mph) riding a supercharged 50 cc Kreidler motorcycle at Bonneville Speedway. His career peak came in 1970, when he finished the season ranked third in the 50 cc world championship behind Ángel Nieto and Aalt Toersen.
