= Ginger Molloy =

New Zealand Grand Prix motorcycle racer (1937–2026)

- Nationality: New Zealand
- Born: William Garth Molloy; 25 December 1937
- Died: 16 September 2026 (aged 88)
Motorcycle racing career statistics
Grand Prix motorcycle racing
Active years	1965–1970
First race	1965 250cc Ulster Grand Prix
Last race	1970 500cc Spanish Grand Prix
First win	1966 250cc Ulster Grand Prix
Last win	1966 250cc Ulster Grand Prix
Team	Bultaco
Championships	0
Starts / Wins / Podiums / Poles / F. laps / Points; 40 / 1 / 13 / N/A / N/A / 194

William Garth "Ginger" Molloy (25 December 1937 – 16 September 2026) was a New Zealand Grand Prix motorcycle racer. He competed from 1965 to 1970 in the Grand Prix world championship.

== Biography ==
Growing up in Huntly, Molloy played rugby league for Huntly United alongside fellow future motorcycle champion Hugh Anderson. Molloy represented New Zealand schoolboys in rugby league before travelling to Europe in 1963.

Riding a Bultaco, Molley won his only world championship race in the 250cc class at the 1966 250cc Ulster Grand Prix. His best season was in 1970 when he rode a Kawasaki H1R to a second-place finish behind Giacomo Agostini in the 500cc world championship. New Zealand road racers had a string of second placings in the premier class – Molloy in 1970, Keith Turner in 1971 and Kim Newcombe in 1973.

Molloy died on 16 September 2026, at the age of 88.

== Grand Prix motorcycle racing results ==
Points system from 1950 to 1968:

**Position**	1	2	3	4	5	6
**Points**	8	6	4	3	2	1

Points system from 1969 onwards:

**Position**	1	2	3	4	5	6	7	8	9	10
**Points**	15	12	10	8	6	5	4	3	2	1

(key) (Races in bold indicate pole position; races in italics indicate fastest lap)

Year	Class	Team	1	2	3	4	5	6	7	8	9	10	11	12	13	Points	Rank	Wins
1965	125cc	Bultaco	USA -	GER -	ESP -	FRA -	IOM -	NED -		DDR -	CZE -	ULS -	FIN -	NAT; 6	JPN -	1	24th	0
1965	250cc	Bultaco	USA -	GER -	ESP -	FRA -	IOM -	NED -	BEL -	DDR -	CZE -	ULS; 6	FIN -	NAT; 4	JPN -	4	20th	0
1966	250cc	Bultaco	ESP -	GER -	FRA -	NED -	BEL -	DDR -	CZE -	FIN -	ULS; 1	IOM -	NAT -	JPN -		8	10th	1
1967	125cc	Bultaco	ESP -	GER -	FRA -	IOM -	NED -	BEL -	DDR -	CZE -	FIN -	ULS; 6	NAT -	CAN -	JPN -	1	28th	0
1967	250cc	Bultaco	ESP; 4	GER -	FRA -	IOM -	NED; 6	BEL; 5	DDR; 5	CZE -	FIN -	ULS -	NAT; 6	CAN -	JPN -	9	7th	0
1968	125cc	Bultaco	GER -	ESP; 2	IOM -	NED; 2		DDR -	CZE -	FIN -	ULS; 4	NAT -				15	**3rd**	0
1968	250cc	Bultaco	GER; 2	ESP; 3	IOM -	NED -	BEL -	DDR; 5	CZE; 6	FIN; 4	ULS; 4	NAT -				19	5th	0
1968	350cc	Bultaco	GER; 4		IOM -	NED; 2		DDR; 4	CZE -		ULS -	NAT -				12	5th	0
1969	125cc	Bultaco	ESP; 7	GER -	FRA; 3	IOM -	NED; 4	BEL -	DDR -	CZE; 8	FIN -		NAT; 7	YUG -		29	6th	0
1969	350cc	Bultaco	ESP; 4	GER -		IOM -	NED -		DDR -	CZE; 10	FIN -	ULS -	NAT; 8	YUG -		12	16th	0
1969	500cc	Bultaco	ESP; 3	GER -	FRA -	IOM -	NED -	BEL -	DDR -	CZE -	FIN -	ULS -	NAT -	YUG -		10	26th	0
1970	250cc	Yamaha	GER -	FRA -	YUG -	IOM -	NED -	BEL -	DDR -	CZE -	FIN -	ULS -	NAT -	ESP; 2		12	19th	0
1970	500cc	Kawasaki	GER; 5	FRA; 2	YUG; 7	IOM -	NED; 4	BEL; 16	DDR; 15		FIN; 2	ULS; 2	NAT; 6	ESP; 2		62	**2nd**	0
