= László Szabó (motorcyclist) =

Hungarian motorcycle racer (1934–2020)

- Nationality: (Hungary) Hungarian
- Born: 4 November 1934; Polgár, Hungary
- Died: 16 May 2020 (aged 85)
Motorcycle racing career statistics
Grand Prix motorcycle racing
Active years	1961, 1963, 1967 - 1972
First race	1961 125cc East German Grand Prix
Last race	1972 350cc Spanish Grand Prix
Championships	0
Starts / Wins / Podiums / Poles / F. laps / Points; 43 / 0 / 12 / 0 / 0 / 43

László Szabó (4 November 1934 – 16 May 2020) was a Grand Prix motorcycle road racer from Hungary. He had his best year in 1970 when he finished the year in fifth place in the 125cc world championship.
