= Günter Bartusch =

German motorcycle racer (1943–1971)

- Nationality: East German
- Born: April 13, 1943; Freiberg, Germany
- Died: July 8, 1971 (aged 28); Hohenstein-Ernstthal, East Germany
Motorcycle racing career statistics
Grand Prix motorcycle racing
Active years	1968 - 1971
First race	1968 125cc East German Grand Prix
Last race	1971 Isle of Man 350cc Junior TT
Team	MZ
Starts / Wins / Podiums / Poles / F. laps / Points; 16 / 0 / 2 / N/A / N/A / 111

Günter Bartusch (April 13, 1943 – July 8, 1971) was a Grand Prix motorcycle road racer from the former East Germany. His best year was in 1970 when he rode for the MZ factory racing team to finish the season in eighth place in the 350cc world championship. Bartusch was killed during practice for the 1971 East German Grand Prix at the Sachsenring.
