= Brian Steenson =

British motorcycle racer

- Nationality: Northern Ireland – British
Motorcycle racing career statistics
Grand Prix motorcycle racing
Active years	1967 – 1970
First race	1967 250cc Ulster Grand Prix
Last race	1970 500cc French Grand Prix
Starts / Wins / Podiums / Poles / F. laps / Points; 7 / 0 / 3 / 0 / 0 / 44

Robert William Brian Steenson was a former Grand Prix motorcycle road racer. His best season was in 1968 when he finished the year in ninth place in the 350cc world championship. In 1969, Steenson finished second to Giacomo Agostini in the Isle of Man Junior TT. He was killed while competing in the 1970 Isle of Man TT.
