= Aalt Toersen =

Dutch motorcycle racer

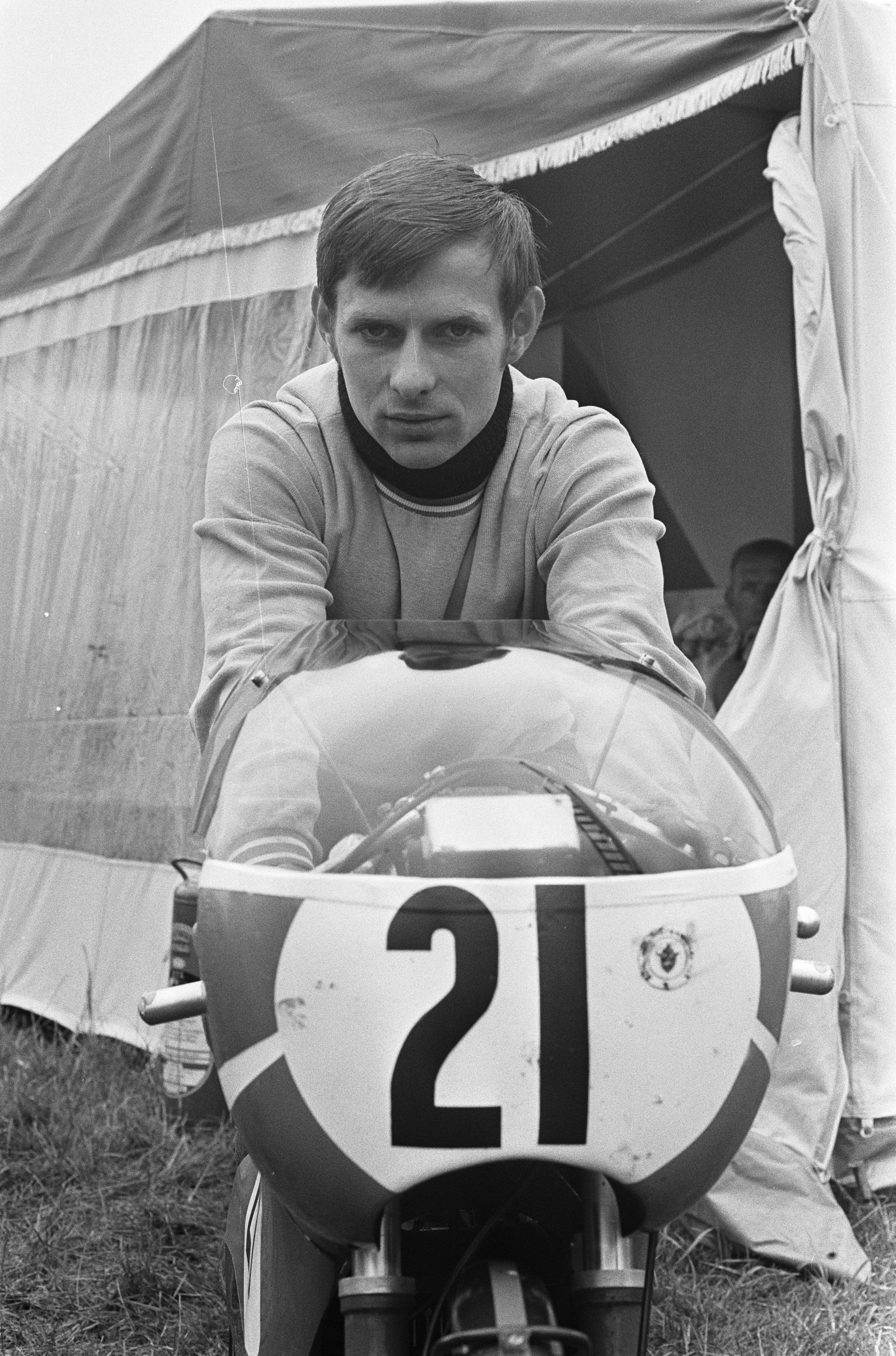
- Aalt Toersen in 1969
- Nationality: Dutch
Motorcycle racing career statistics
Grand Prix motorcycle racing
Active years	1967 - 1972
First race	1967 50cc Dutch TT
Last race	1972 50cc East German Grand Prix
First win	1969 50cc Spanish Grand Prix
Last win	1970 50cc Czechoslovakian Grand Prix
Team(s)	Kreidler, Jamathi
Championships	0
Starts / Wins / Podiums / Poles / F. laps / Points; 30 / 6 / 13 / N/A / N/A / 219

Aalt Toersen (born 6 November 1945 in Staphorst, Overijssel) is a Dutch former professional Grand Prix motorcycle road racer.

Toersen had his best years in 1969 and 1970 when he won three races and finished the season in second place in the 50cc world championship, both times behind Angel Nieto.

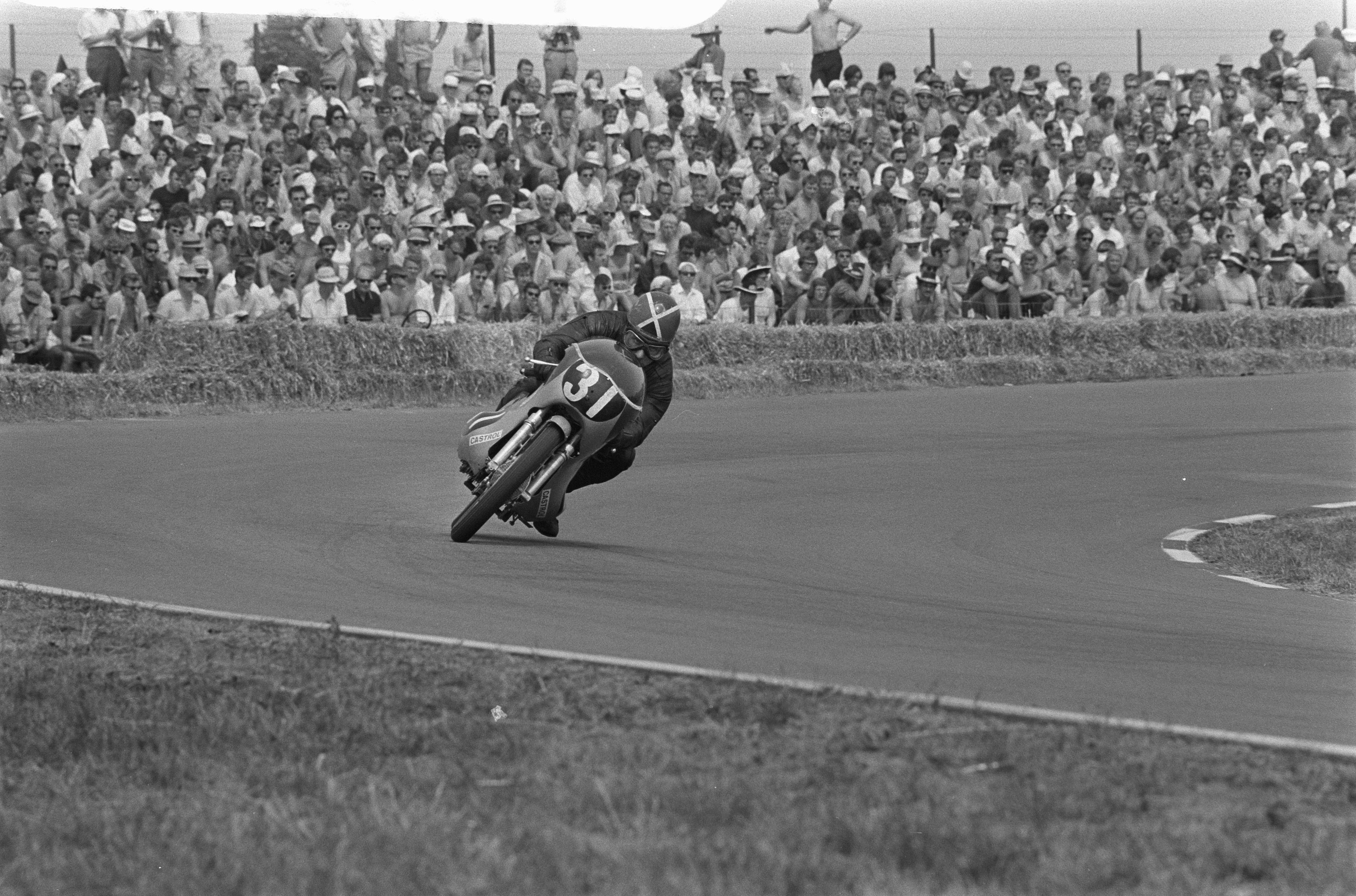
Toersen (31) in action during the 1970 125cc Dutch TT.
