= 1970 Grand Prix motorcycle racing season =

Sports season

1970 F.I.M. Grand Prix motorcycle racing season

Seasons
- ← 1969 1971 →

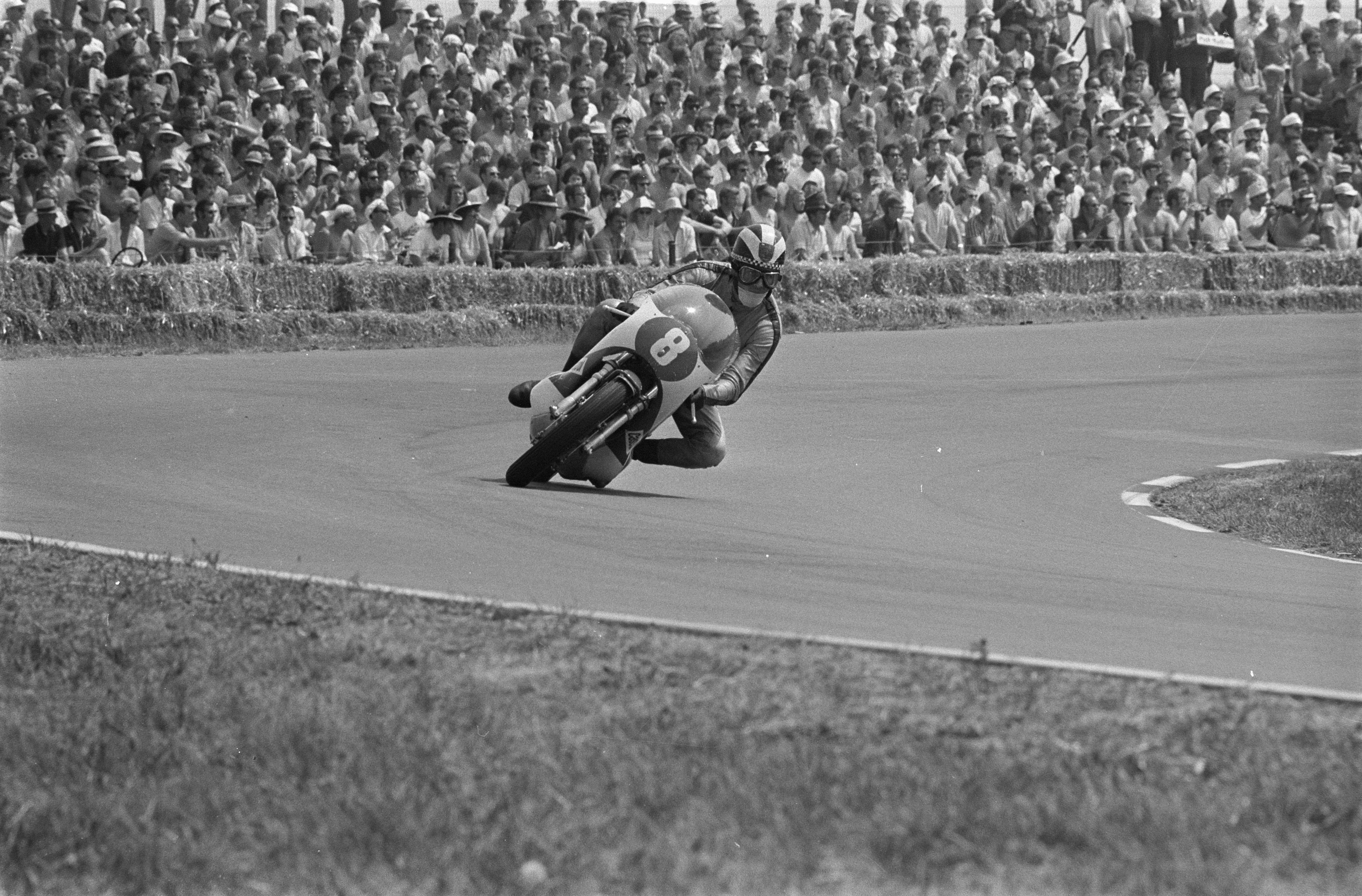
Phil Read (8) finished second at the 1970 Dutch TT

The 1970 Grand Prix motorcycle racing season was the 22nd F.I.M. Road Racing World Championship Grand Prix season. The season consisted of twelve Grand Prix races in six classes: 500cc, 350cc, 250cc, 125cc, 50cc and Sidecars 500cc. It began on 3 May, with West German Grand Prix and ended with Spanish Grand Prix on 27 September.

This is the most recent season before 2024 that the Japanese manufacturers failed to score a single win in the premier class.

== Season summary ==
The MV Agusta team continued to dominate as Giacomo Agostini won his fifth consecutive 500cc world championship against minimal opposition from other manufacturers. From 1968 to 1970, Agostini and MV Agusta were so dominant that Agostini won every single race he contested in the 350cc and 500cc classes. However, Japanese manufacturers continued to improve two-stroke engine technology. In 1970, Kawasaki began to sell the Kawasaki H1R to privateer racing teams. The H1R was the first multi-cylinder two stroke racing motorcycle to be sold commercially. Ginger Molloy rode one of the Kawasakis to a second-place finish behind Agostini in the 500cc championship.

Life was harder for Agostini in the 350 class as Kel Carruthers and Renzo Pasolini on Benellis and Rod Gould on a factory Yamaha gave him a battle on more than one occasion. Gould would take the 250 title for Yamaha, battling Carruthers for the entire season. German Dieter Braun would give Suzuki the 125 crown while Derbi mounted Angel Nieto claimed the 50cc class for the second year in a row.

Braun's victory at the 1970 Isle of Man TT was notable because he was one of only seven riders to have won an Isle of Man TT race in their first attempt. Due to the circuit's 37.7 mile length, it usually takes competitors two or three attempts before they learn its nuances. There were six fatalities among the competitors at the Isle of Man TT races, including world championship contender Santiago Herrero, making 1970 the deadliest year in the history of the event.

== 1970 Grand Prix season calendar ==
| Round | Date | Grand Prix | Circuit | 50cc winner | 125cc winner | 250cc winner | 350cc winner | 500cc winner | Sidecars 500cc winner | Report |
|---|---|---|---|---|---|---|---|---|---|---|
| 1 | 3 May | (West Germany) West German Grand Prix | Nürburgring Nordschleife | (Spain) Angel Nieto | (Australia) John Dodds | (Australia) Kel Carruthers | (Italy) Giacomo Agostini | (Italy) Giacomo Agostini | (Germany) Auerbacher / Hahn | Report |
| 2 | 17 May | (France) French Grand Prix | Le Mans Bugatti | (Spain) Angel Nieto | (West Germany) Dieter Braun | (United Kingdom) Rodney Gould | | (Italy) Giacomo Agostini | (Germany) Enders / Kalauch | Report |
| 3 | 24 May | (Socialist Federal Republic of Yugoslavia) Yugoslavian Grand Prix | Opatija Circuit | (Spain) Angel Nieto | (West Germany) Dieter Braun | (Spain) Santiago Herrero | (Italy) Giacomo Agostini | (Italy) Giacomo Agostini | | Report |
| 4 | 12 June | Isle of Man TT | Snaefell Mountain | | (West Germany) Dieter Braun | (Australia) Kel Carruthers | (Italy) Giacomo Agostini | (Italy) Giacomo Agostini | (Germany) Enders / Kalauch | Report |
| 5 | 27 June | (Netherlands) Dutch TT | Assen | (Spain) Angel Nieto | (West Germany) Dieter Braun | (United Kingdom) Rodney Gould | (Italy) Giacomo Agostini | (Italy) Giacomo Agostini | (Germany) Auerbacher / Hahn | Report |
| 6 | 5 July | (Belgium) Belgian Grand Prix | Spa-Francorchamps | (Netherlands) Aalt Toersen | (Spain) Angel Nieto | (United Kingdom) Rodney Gould | | (Italy) Giacomo Agostini | (Germany) Butscher / Huber | Report |
| 7 | 12 July | (East Germany) East German Grand Prix | Sachsenring | (Netherlands) Aalt Toersen | (Spain) Angel Nieto | (United Kingdom) Rodney Gould | (Italy) Giacomo Agostini | (Italy) Giacomo Agostini | | Report |
| 8 | 19 July | (Czechoslovakia) Czechoslovak Grand Prix | Masaryk Circuit | (Netherlands) Aalt Toersen | (Italy) Gilberto Parlotti | (Australia) Kel Carruthers | (Italy) Giacomo Agostini | | (Germany) Enders / Engelhardt | Report |
| 9 | 2 August | (Finland) Finnish Grand Prix | Imatra Circuit | | (United Kingdom) Dave Simmonds | (United Kingdom) Rodney Gould | (Italy) Giacomo Agostini | (Italy) Giacomo Agostini | (Germany) Enders / Engelhardt | Report |
| 10 | 15 August | (Northern Ireland) Ulster Grand Prix | Dundrod Circuit | (Spain) Angel Nieto | | (Australia) Kel Carruthers | (Italy) Giacomo Agostini | (Italy) Giacomo Agostini | (Germany) Enders / Engelhardt | Report |
| 11 | 13 September | (Italy) Nations Grand Prix | Monza | (Netherlands) Jan de Vries | (Spain) Angel Nieto | (United Kingdom) Rodney Gould | (Italy) Giacomo Agostini | (Italy) Giacomo Agostini | | Report |
| 12 | 27 September | (Spain) Spanish Grand Prix | Montjuich | (Spain) Salvador Cañellas | (Spain) Angel Nieto | (Sweden) Kent Andersson | (Italy) Angelo Bergamonti | (Italy) Angelo Bergamonti | | Report |

== Final standings ==
=== Scoring system ===
Points were awarded to the top ten finishers in each race. Only the best of six races were counted on 50cc, 125cc, 350cc and 500cc championships, best of seven in 250cc, while in the Sidecars, the best of five races were counted.

| Position | 1st | 2nd | 3rd | 4th | 5th | 6th | 7th | 8th | 9th | 10th |
|---|---|---|---|---|---|---|---|---|---|---|
| Points | 15 | 12 | 10 | 8 | 6 | 5 | 4 | 3 | 2 | 1 |

==== 500cc final standings ====
| Pos | Rider | Machine | GER (Germany) | FRA (France) | YUG (Socialist Federal Republic of Yugoslavia) | MAN (Isle of Man) | HOL (Netherlands) | BEL (Belgium) | DDR (East Germany) | FIN (Finland) | ULS (Northern Ireland) | NAC (Italy) | ESP (Spain) | Pts |
|---|---|---|---|---|---|---|---|---|---|---|---|---|---|---|
| 1 | (Italy) Giacomo Agostini | MV Agusta | 1 | 1 | 1 | 1 | 1 | 1 | 1 | 1 | 1 | 1 | | 90 |
| 2 | (New Zealand) Ginger Molloy | Bultaco / Kawasaki | 5 | 2 | 7 | | 4 | 16 | 15 | 2 | 2 | 6 | 2 | 62 |
| 3 | (Italy) Angelo Bergamonti | Aermacchi / MV Agusta | | 4 | 2 | | 2 | | | | | 2 | **1** | 59 |
| 4 | (Northern Ireland) Tommy Robb | Seeley | 3 | 11 | | Ret | 10 | 3 | 10 | 5 | Ret | | 4 | 36 |
| 5 | (Italy) Alberto Pagani | Linto | | 3 | Ret | | 3 | Ret | Ret | 3 | | Ret | Ret | 30 |
| 6 | (United Kingdom) Alan Barnett | Seeley-Matchless | 2 | 7 | | Ret | | | 4 | | Ret | | | 24 |
| 7 | (France) Christian Ravel | Kawasaki | | 8 | | | Ret | 2 | 5 | Ret | Ret | Ret | 8 | 24 |
| 8 | (Australia) Jack Findlay | Seeley-Matchless / Seeley-Suzuki | Ret | Ret | 4 | 4 | Ret | Ret | 12 | Ret | 4 | Ret | Ret | 24 |
| 9 | (Finland) Martti Pesonen | Yamaha | 7 | | 5 | Ret | Ret | 8 | | 8 | 7 | | 7 | 24 |
| 10 | (United Kingdom) Peter Williams | Matchless | | | | 2 | 7 | | | | 5 | | | 22 |
| 11 | (Italy) Roberto Gallina | Paton | | | 3 | | Ret | | | | | 7 | 5 | 20 |
| 12 | (United Kingdom) Martin Carney | Kawasaki | Ret | | | Ret | | | 3 | | 6 | | 6 | 20 |
| 13 | (Switzerland) Gyula Marsovszky | Linto / Kawasaki | 11 | 6 | 8 | | 9 | Ret | Ret | Ret | | 4 | Ret | 18 |
| 14 | (France) Eric Offenstadt | Kawasaki | Ret | 9 | | | | 13 | 7 | 4 | | Ret | | 14 |
| 15 | (Australia) John Dodds | Linto | Ret | Ret | | | Ret | Ret | 2 | Ret | | Ret | Ret | 12 |
| 16 | (Italy) Silvano Bertarelli | Kawasaki | | Ret | | | | | | | | 3 | | 10 |
| = | (United Kingdom) Bill Smith | Kawasaki / Yamaha | | | | 3 | | | | | Ret | | | 10 |
| = | (United Kingdom) Percy Tait | Triumph / Seeley-Matchless | | | | | | Ret | | | 3 | | | 10 |
| 19 | (Italy) Giuseppe Mandolini | Moto Guzzi | | | | | | | | | | | 3 | 10 |
| 20 | (United Kingdom) Dave Simmonds | Kawasaki | Ret | 12 | 6 | | 12 | 12 | 8 | Ret | | | 9 | 10 |
| 21 | (Germany) Karl Hoppe | Münch-URS / Seeley-URS | 4 | 16 | | | Ret | | Ret | | | | | 8 |
| 22 | (Austria) Karl Auer | Matchless | | | Ret | | | 4 | Ret | | | | | 8 |
| 23 | (Italy) Gianpiero Zubani | Kawasaki | | | 9 | | | | | | | 5 | | 8 |
| = | (United Kingdom) John Williams | Matchless | | | | 5 | | | | | 9 | | | 8 |
| 25 | (United Kingdom) Godfrey Nash | Norton / Manx | Ret | Ret | | | Ret | 11 | 9 | 6 | | | | 7 |
| 26 | (United Kingdom) Billie Nelson | Paton | 9 | | | | Ret | Ret | 6 | Ret | Ret | Ret | | 7 |
| 27 | (Germany) Ernst Hiller | Kawasaki | 8 | | | | Ret | 7 | Ret | | | | | 7 |
| 28 | (United Kingdom) Lewis Young | Honda / Matchless | Ret | Ret | 11 | | Ret | 5 | | Ret | | | Ret | 6 |
| 29 | (Northern Ireland) Brian Steenson | Seeley-Matchless | 15 | 5 | | Ret | | | | | | | | 6 |
| 30 | (United Kingdom) Paul Smart | Seeley-Matchless | | | | Ret | 5 | | | Ret | Ret | | | 6 |
| 31 | (Australia) Terry Dennehy | Honda | 10 | Ret | Ret | | 13 | 6 | | Ret | | Ret | Ret | 6 |
| 32 | (United Kingdom) Tony Jefferies | Matchless | | | | 6 | | | | | Ret | | | 5 |
| = | (Switzerland) Walter Rungg | Aermacchi | 6 | Ret | Ret | | | | | | | | | 5 |
| 34 | (Netherlands) Rob Bron | Suzuki | | | | | 6 | | | | | | | 5 |
| 35 | (United Kingdom) Steve Ellis | Linto / Matchless | Ret | Ret | 14 | | | 10 | Ret | 7 | | | | 5 |
| 36 | (United Kingdom) Ron Chandler | Seeley-Matchless / Triumph | Ret | | | | 8 | 9 | | | Ret | | | 5 |
| 37 | (United Kingdom) Selwyn Griffiths | Matchless | | | | 7 | | | | | | | | 4 |
| 38 | (Northern Ireland) Gerry Mateer | Norton | | | | Ret | | | | | 8 | | | 3 |
| 39 | (United Kingdom) Brian Adams | Norton | | | | 8 | | | | | | | | 3 |
| = | (Italy) Giovanni Perrone | Kawasaki | | | | | | | | | | 8 | | 3 |
| 41 | (United Kingdom) Vincent Duckett | Seeley-Matchless | | | | 9 | | | | | 13 | | | 2 |
| 42 | (Germany) Hans-Otto Butenuth | BMW | Ret | | | Ret | | | | 9 | | | | 2 |
| 43 | (Italy) Paolo Campanelli | Kawasaki | | | Ret | | | | | | | 9 | | 2 |
| 44 | (Switzerland) Jean Campiche | Honda | | Ret | 10 | | | | 14 | 10 | | Ret | | 2 |
| 45 | (Rhodesia) Gordon Keith | Velocette | Ret | | | 21 | | | Ret | | | | 10 | 1 |
| 46 | (France) André-Luc Appietto | Paton | | 10 | | | | | | | | | | 1 |
| = | (United Kingdom) Charlie Dobson | Seeley-Matchless | | | | | | | | | 10 | | | 1 |
| = | (Italy) Vasco Loro | Norton-Kawasaki | | | | | | | | | | 10 | | 1 |
| = | (United Kingdom) Steve Spencer | Norton | | | | 10 | | | | | | | | 1 |
| 50 | (Austria) Werner Bergold | Linto / Seeley | | 14 | | | | | 11 | | | | | 0 |
| 51 | (Wales) Malcolm Uphill | Suzuki | | | | Ret | 11 | | | | Ret | | | 0 |
| 52 | (Italy) Emanuele Maugliani | Seeley | | | | | | | Ret | | | 11 | | 0 |
| 53 | (United Kingdom) Peter Berwick | Aermacchi | | | | | | | | | 11 | | | 0 |
| = | (United Kingdom) John Burgess | Norton | | Ret | | | | | | | | | 11 | 0 |
| = | (United Kingdom) Jim Curry | Aermacchi | | | | | | | | 11 | | | | 0 |
| = | (United Kingdom) Keith Heckles | Norton | | | | 11 | | | | | | | | 0 |
| 57 | (Germany) Heinrich Rosenbusch | Linto | 12 | | Ret | | 14 | | | | | | | 0 |
| 58 | (United Kingdom) Alan Lawton | Norton | | | | 14 | | | | | 12 | | | 0 |
| 59 | (United Kingdom) George Fogarty | Shepherd | | | | 12 | | | | | 17 | | | 0 |
| 60 | (Finland) Jouko Ryhänen | Matchless | | | | | | | | 12 | | | | 0 |
| = | (Czechoslovakia) František Srna | Jawa | | | 12 | | | | | | | | | 0 |
| 62 | (France) Pierre-Louis Tebec | Kawasaki | 26 | 13 | | | | | | | | | | 0 |
| 63 | (Germany) Gerhard Heukerott | Benelli | | | Ret | | Ret | | | 13 | | Ret | | 0 |
| 64 | (Sweden) Sven-Olov Gunnarsson | Kawasaki | | | | | | | 13 | Ret | | | | 0 |
| 65 | (United Kingdom) John Blanchard | Seeley | 13 | | | | | | | | | | | 0 |
| = | (United Kingdom) Ken Tilley | Norton | | | | 13 | | | | | | | | 0 |
| = | (Switzerland) Alo Zanetta | Kawasaki | | | 13 | | | | | | | | | 0 |
| 68 | (Sweden) Billy Andersson | Matchless / Crescent | | | | 39 | | 14 | Ret | | | | | 0 |
| 69 | (Germany) Ferdinand Kaczor | Seeley-URS | 14 | Ret | | | | | | | | | | 0 |
| 70 | (Northern Ireland) Harris Healey | Norton | | | | | | | | | 14 | | | 0 |
| 71 | (United Kingdom) Ken Kay | Aermacchi | | | | 28 | | | | | 15 | | | 0 |
| 72 | (United Kingdom) Bob Heath | BSA | | | | Ret | 15 | | | | | | | 0 |
| 73 | (Belgium) Serge Jamsin | Norton | | | | | | 15 | | | | | | 0 |
| = | (France) Hervé Lansac | Kawasaki | | 15 | | | | | | | | | | 0 |
| = | (United Kingdom) Norman Price | Norton | | | | 15 | | | | | | | | 0 |
| 76 | (United Kingdom) Maurice Hawthorne | Norton / Linto | 16 | | | | | | | | | | Ret | 0 |
| 77 | (United Kingdom) Peter Gibson | Seeley | | | | 16 | | | | | | | | 0 |
| = | (Northern Ireland) Cambell Gorman | Velocette | | | | | | | | | 16 | | | 0 |
| = | (Australia) Terry McDonald | Matchless | | | | | | | 16 | | | | | 0 |
| 80 | (France) Jean-Claude Costeux | Aermacchi | | 17 | | | | | | | | | | 0 |
| = | (United Kingdom) Peter Darvill | Higley-Seeley | | | | 17 | | | | | | | | 0 |
| = | (United Kingdom) Stephen Millard | Matchless | 17 | | | | | | | | | | | 0 |
| = | (Italy) Franco Trabalzini | Paton | | | | | | | 17 | | | | | 0 |
| 84 | (United Kingdom) Chris Neve | Seeley | | | | 34 | | | | | 18 | | | 0 |
| 85 | (Sweden) Bo Granath | Husqvarna | 18 | Ret | | Ret | | Ret | Ret | Ret | | | Ret | 0 |
| 86 | (United Kingdom) Bob Biscardine | Norton | | | | 18 | | | | | | | | 0 |
| = | (Hungary) Arpad Juhos | Matchless | | | | | | | 18 | | | | | 0 |
| 88 | (Northern Ireland) Roy Reid | Norton | | | | 35 | | | | | 19 | | | 0 |
| 89 | (Germany) Paul Eickelberg | Matchless / Norton | 19 | | Ret | | | | | Ret | | | | 0 |
| 90 | (United Kingdom) Geoff Barry | Oakley-Matchless | | | | 19 | | | | | | | | 0 |
| 91 | (United Kingdom) John Barton | Triumph | | | | 20 | | | | | | | | 0 |
| = | (United Kingdom) Nigel Palmer | Matchless | 20 | | | | | | | | | | | 0 |
| = | (Northern Ireland) Harry Turner | Norton | | | | | | | | | 20 | | | 0 |
| 94 | (Switzerland) Gilbert Argo | Matchless | 21 | | | | | | | | | | | 0 |
| 95 | (Austria) Alois Maxwald | Matchless | 22 | | | | | | Ret | | | | | 0 |
| 96 | (United Kingdom) Don Grant | Norton | | | | 22 | | | | | | | | 0 |
| 97 | (United Kingdom) Barry Randle | Seeley | 23 | | | Ret | | | | | Ret | | | 0 |
| 98 | (United Kingdom) Brian Moses | Norton | | | | 23 | | | | | | | | 0 |
| 99 | (Germany) Willi Bertsch | Honda | 24 | | | | | | | | | | | 0 |
| = | (United Kingdom) Dave Foulkes | Norton | | | | 24 | | | | | | | | 0 |
| 101 | (United Kingdom) Brian Edwards | Kettle-Norton | | | | 25 | | | | | | | | 0 |
| = | (France) Jean-Marie Grandidier | Matchless | 25 | | | | | | | | | | | 0 |
| 103 | (United Kingdom) Brian Swales | Norton | | | | 26 | | | | | | | | 0 |
| 104 | (United Kingdom) Gordon Daniels | Matchless | | | | 27 | | | | | | | | 0 |
| = | (United Kingdom) Jerry Lancaster | Aermacchi | 27 | | | | | | | | | | | 0 |
| 106 | (Germany) Rudolf Reinhardt | BMW | 28 | | | | | | | | | | | 0 |
| 107 | (United Kingdom) Graham Sharp | Petty-Norton | | | | 29 | | | | | | | | 0 |
| = | (Germany) Jupp Tröblinger | Norton | 29 | | | | | | | | | | | 0 |
| 109 | (United Kingdom) Don Harris | Norton | | | | 30 | | | | | | | | 0 |
| = | (Austria) Walfried Weingartner | Matchless | 30 | | | | | | | | | | | 0 |
| 111 | (United Kingdom) Ron Baylie | Triumph | | | | 31 | | | | | | | | 0 |
| = | (Germany) Ted Janssen | Norton | 31 | | | | | | | | | | | 0 |
| 113 | (United Kingdom) John Pepper | Norton | | | | 32 | | | | | | | | 0 |
| 114 | (United Kingdom) Len Williams | Aermacchi | | | | 33 | | | | | | | | 0 |
| 115 | (United Kingdom) Roger Fursman | Norton | | | | 36 | | | | | | | | 0 |
| 116 | (United Kingdom) Dennis Trollope | Norton | | | | 37 | | | | | | | | 0 |
| 117 | (United Kingdom) Carl Ward | Norton | | | | 38 | | | | | | | | 0 |
| 118 | (United Kingdom) Mick Potter | Metisse | | | | 40 | | | | | | | | 0 |
| 119 | (United Kingdom) Graham Penny | Honda | | | | 41 | | | | | | | | 0 |
| - | (Netherlands) Theo Louwes | Kawasaki / Matchless | | Ret | | | Ret | Ret | | Ret | Ret | | | 0 |
| - | (New Zealand) Keith Turner | Linto | | Ret | | | | | Ret | Ret | | | | 0 |
| - | (United Kingdom) Cliff Carr | Kawasaki | Ret | | | | | | | | Ret | | | 0 |
| - | (United Kingdom) Tom Dickie | Kuhn-Seeley | | | | Ret | | | | | Ret | | | 0 |
| - | (United Kingdom) John-Tom Findlay | Norton | | | | Ret | | | | | Ret | | | 0 |
| - | (United Kingdom) Robert Graham | Matchless / Aermacchi | | | | Ret | | | | | Ret | | | 0 |
| - | (Finland) Pentti Lehtelä | Matchless / Yamaha | | | | | | | Ret | Ret | | | | 0 |
| - | (Italy) Renzo Pasolini | Benelli | | | | | | | Ret | | | Ret | | 0 |
| - | (Switzerland) Philippe Schreyer | Kawasaki | Ret | Ret | | | | | | | | | | 0 |
| - | (United Kingdom) Stan Adams | Seeley | Ret | | | | | | | | | | | 0 |
| - | (United Kingdom) Tom Armstrong | Norton | | | | Ret | | | | | | | | 0 |
| - | (United Kingdom) Jim Ashton | Matchless | | | | Ret | | | | | | | | 0 |
| - | (United Kingdom) George Barnacle | Triumph | | | | Ret | | | | | | | | 0 |
| - | (United Kingdom) Rex Butcher | Metisse | | | | | Ret | | | | | | | 0 |
| - | (United Kingdom) Doug Cash | Norton | | | | Ret | | | | | | | | 0 |
| - | (United Kingdom) Paul Coombs | CRD | | | | Ret | | | | | | | | 0 |
| - | (United Kingdom) Adrian Cooper | Norton | | | | Ret | | | | | | | | 0 |
| - | (United Kingdom) John Cooper | Seeley | | | | Ret | | | | | | | | 0 |
| - | (Sweden) Ake Dahli | Kawasaki | | | | | | | Ret | | | | | 0 |
| - | (United Kingdom) Walter Dawson | Norton | | | | Ret | | | | | | | | 0 |
| - | (United Kingdom) Charlie Dobson | Seeley | | | | Ret | | | | | | | | 0 |
| - | (France) Didier Dumesnil | Linto | | Ret | | | | | | | | | | 0 |
| - | (United Kingdom) Robin Duffty | Norton | | | | Ret | | | | | | | | 0 |
| - | (United Kingdom) Hugh Evans | CRD | | | | Ret | | | | | | | | 0 |
| - | (United Kingdom) Derek Filler | Norton | | | | Ret | | | | | | | | 0 |
| - | (United Kingdom) Denis Gallagher | Seeley | | | | | | | | | Ret | | | 0 |
| - | (United Kingdom) Lou Geeson | Triumph | | | | Ret | | | | | | | | 0 |
| - | (United Kingdom) Mick Grant | Velocette | | | | Ret | | | | | | | | 0 |
| - | (United Kingdom) Chris Gregory | Norton | | | | Ret | | | | | | | | 0 |
| = | (France) René Guili | Matchless | | Ret | | | | | | | | | | 0 |
| - | (Finland) Osmo Hansen | Matchless | | | | | | | | Ret | | | | 0 |
| - | (United Kingdom) Ray Knight | CRD | | | | Ret | | | | | | | | 0 |
| - | (Finland) Hannu Kuparinen | Matchless | | | | | | | | Ret | | | | 0 |
| - | (United Kingdom) Cliff Lawson | Norton | | | | Ret | | | | | | | | 0 |
| - | (United Kingdom) Derek Lee | Matchless | | | | Ret | | | | | | | | 0 |
| - | (France) Patrick Lefevre | Norton | | Ret | | | | | | | | | | 0 |
| = | (United States) Marty Lunde | Crescent | | Ret | | | | | | | | | | 0 |
| - | (United Kingdom) Pat Mahoney | Kuhn-Seeley | | | | Ret | | | | | | | | 0 |
| - | (United Kingdom) Percy May | Petty-Norton | | | | Ret | | | | | | | | 0 |
| - | (Northern Ireland) Ray McCullough | Seeley | | | | | | | | | Ret | | | 0 |
| - | (Italy) Gilberto Milani | Aermacchi | | | | | | | | | | Ret | | 0 |
| - | (United Kingdom) Malcolm Moffatt | Seeley | | | | Ret | | | | | | | | 0 |
| - | (Algeria) Mustapha Moulay | Paton | | Ret | | | | | | | | | | 0 |
| - | (France) Jean-Pierre Naudon | Matchless | | Ret | | | | | | | | | | 0 |
| - | (South Africa) Garth Neveling | Norton | | | | Ret | | | | | | | | 0 |
| - | (United Kingdom) Derryl Pandlebury | Norton | | | | Ret | | | | | | | | 0 |
| - | (United Kingdom) Dick Pipes | Norton | | | | Ret | | | | | | | | 0 |
| - | (United Kingdom) Harry Reynolds | Norton | | | | Ret | | | | | | | | 0 |
| = | (France) Jacques Roca | Suzuki | | Ret | | | | | | | | | | 0 |
| - | (United Kingdom) Barry Sheene | Bultaco | | | | | | | | | | | Ret | 0 |
| - | (United Kingdom) Roy Simmons | Norton | | | | Ret | | | | | | | | 0 |
| - | (United Kingdom) John Stanley | Seeley | | | | Ret | | | | | | | | 0 |
| - | (Czechoslovakia) František Šťastný | Jawa | | | | | | Ret | | | | | | 0 |
| - | (France) Thierry Tchernine | Velocette | | Ret | | | | | | | | | | 0 |
| - | (Germany) Rolf Thiemig | Ducati | Ret | | | | | | | | | | | 0 |
| - | (Italy) Franco Trabalzini | Paton | Ret | | | | | | | | | | | 0 |
| - | (United Kingdom) Tony Turner | Norton | | | | Ret | | | | | | | | 0 |
| - | (United Kingdom) Fred Walton | Velocette | | | | Ret | | | | | | | | 0 |
| - | (Northern Ireland) Charlie Watts | Norton | | | | | | | | | Ret | | | 0 |
| - | (Malta) John Wetherall | Norton | | | | Ret | | | | | | | | 0 |
| - | (Italy) Benedetto Zambotti | Bianchi | | | | | | | | | | Ret | | 0 |
| Pos | Rider | Bike | GER (Germany) | FRA (France) | YUG (Socialist Federal Republic of Yugoslavia) | MAN (United Kingdom) | HOL (Netherlands) | BEL (Belgium) | DDR (East Germany) | FIN (Finland) | ULS (Ulster) | NAC (Italy) | ESP (Spain) | Pts |

| Colour | Result |
|---|---|
| Gold | Winner |
| Silver | Second place |
| Bronze | Third place |
| Green | Points classification |
| Blue | Non-points classification |
| Blue | Non-classified finish (NC) |
| Purple | Retired, not classified (Ret) |
| Red | Did not qualify (DNQ) |
| Red | Did not pre-qualify (DNPQ) |
| Black | Disqualified (DSQ) |
| White | Did not start (DNS) |
| White | Withdrew (WD) |
| White | Race cancelled (C) |
| Blank | Did not practice (DNP) |
| Blank | Did not arrive (DNA) |
| Blank | Excluded (EX) |

**Bold** – Pole
Italics – Fastest Lap

=== 1970 350 cc Roadracing World Championship final standings ===
| Place | Rider | Number | Country | Machine | Points | Wins |
|---|---|---|---|---|---|---|
| 1 | (Italy) Giacomo Agostini | 1 | Italy | MV Agusta | 90 | 9 |
| 2 | (Australia) Kel Carruthers | 7 | Australia | Benelli | 58 | 0 |
| 3 | (Italy) Renzo Pasolini | | Italy | Benelli | 46 | 0 |
| 4 | (Sweden) Kent Andersson | | Sweden | Yamaha | 44 | 0 |
| 5 | (Finland) Martti Pesonen | | Finland | Yamaha | 38 | 0 |
| 6 | (United Kingdom) Rodney Gould | | United Kingdom | Yamaha | 28 | 0 |
| 7 | (Italy) Angelo Bergamonti | | Italy | MV Agusta | 27 | 1 |
| 8 | (East Germany) Günter Bartusch | | East Germany | MZ | 20 | 0 |
| 9 | (United Kingdom) Alan Barnett | | United Kingdom | Aermacchi | 20 | 0 |
| 10 | (United Kingdom) Tommy Robb | | United Kingdom | Yamaha | 18 | 0 |

=== 1970 250 cc Roadracing World Championship final standings ===
| Place | Rider | Number | Country | Machine | Points | Wins |
|---|---|---|---|---|---|---|
| 1 | (United Kingdom) Rodney Gould | 6 | United Kingdom | Yamaha | 102 | 6 |
| 2 | (Australia) Kel Carruthers | | Australia | Yamaha | 84 | 4 |
| 3 | (Sweden) Kent Andersson | 2 | Sweden | Yamaha | 67 | 1 |
| 4 | (Finland) Jarno Saarinen | | Finland | Yamaha | 57 | 0 |
| 5 | (Sweden) Börje Jansson | 5 | Sweden | Yamaha | 34 | 0 |
| 6 | (United Kingdom) Chas Mortimer | | United Kingdom | Yamaha | 30 | 0 |
| 7 | (Switzerland) Gyula Marsovsky | | Switzerland | Yamaha | 28 | 0 |
| 8 | (Spain) Santiago Herrero | 3 | Spain | Ossa | 27 | 1 |
| 9 | (Sweden) Bo Granath | | Sweden | Yamaha | 25 | 0 |
| 10 | (Italy) Silvio Grassetti | | Italy | Yamaha | 24 | 0 |

=== 1970 125 cc Roadracing World Championship final standings ===
| Place | Rider | Number | Country | Machine | Points | Wins |
|---|---|---|---|---|---|---|
| 1 | (West Germany) Dieter Braun | 2 | West Germany | Suzuki | 84 | 4 |
| 2 | (Spain) Angel Nieto | | Spain | Derbi | 72 | 4 |
| 3 | (Sweden) Börje Jansson | | Sweden | Maico | 62 | 0 |
| 4 | (United Kingdom) Dave Simmonds | 1 | United Kingdom | Kawasaki | 57 | 1 |
| 5 | (Hungary) László Szabó | 8 | Hungary | MZ | 34 | 0 |
| 6 | (West Germany) Toni Gruber | | West Germany | Maico | 33 | 0 |
| 7 | (Netherlands) Aalt Toersen | | Netherlands | Suzuki | 31 | 0 |
| 8 | (Australia) John Dodds | | Australia | Aermacchi | 24 | 1 |
| 9 | (East Germany) Gunter Bartusch | | East Germany | MZ | 22 | 0 |
| 10 | (Austria) Heinz Kriwanek | | Austria | Rotax | 25 | 0 |

=== 1970 50 cc Roadracing World Championship final standings ===
| Place | Rider | Number | Country | Machine | Points | Wins |
|---|---|---|---|---|---|---|
| 1 | (Spain) Angel Nieto | 1 | Spain | Derbi | 87 | 5 |
| 2 | (Netherlands) Aalt Toersen | 2 | Netherlands | Jamathi | 75 | 3 |
| 3 | (West Germany) Rudolf Kunz | 8 | West Germany | Kreidler | 66 | 0 |
| 4 | (Spain) Salvador Cañellas | | Spain | Derbi | 63 | 1 |
| 5 | (Netherlands) Jan De Vries | 4 | Netherlands | Kreidler | 60 | 1 |
| 6 | (Netherlands) Jos Schurgers | | Netherlands | Kreidler | 41 | 0 |
| 7 | (Netherlands) Martin Mijwaart | 10 | Netherlands | Jamathi | 40 | 0 |
| 8 | (West Germany) Ludwig Fassbender | 9 | West Germany | Kreidler | 17 | 0 |
| 9 | (Italy) Gilberto Parlotti | 6 | Italy | Tomos | 15 | 1 |
| 10 | (Austria) Harald Bartol | | Austria | Kreidler | 11 | 0 |
