= Lino Tonti =

Italian motorcycle designer (1920–2002)

- Born: September 16, 1920; Cattolica, Italy
- Died: June 8, 2002 (aged 81); Varese
- Occupation: Motorcycle designer
- Employer(s): Benelli, Aermacchi, Mondial, Paton, Bianchi, Gilera, Moto Guzzi

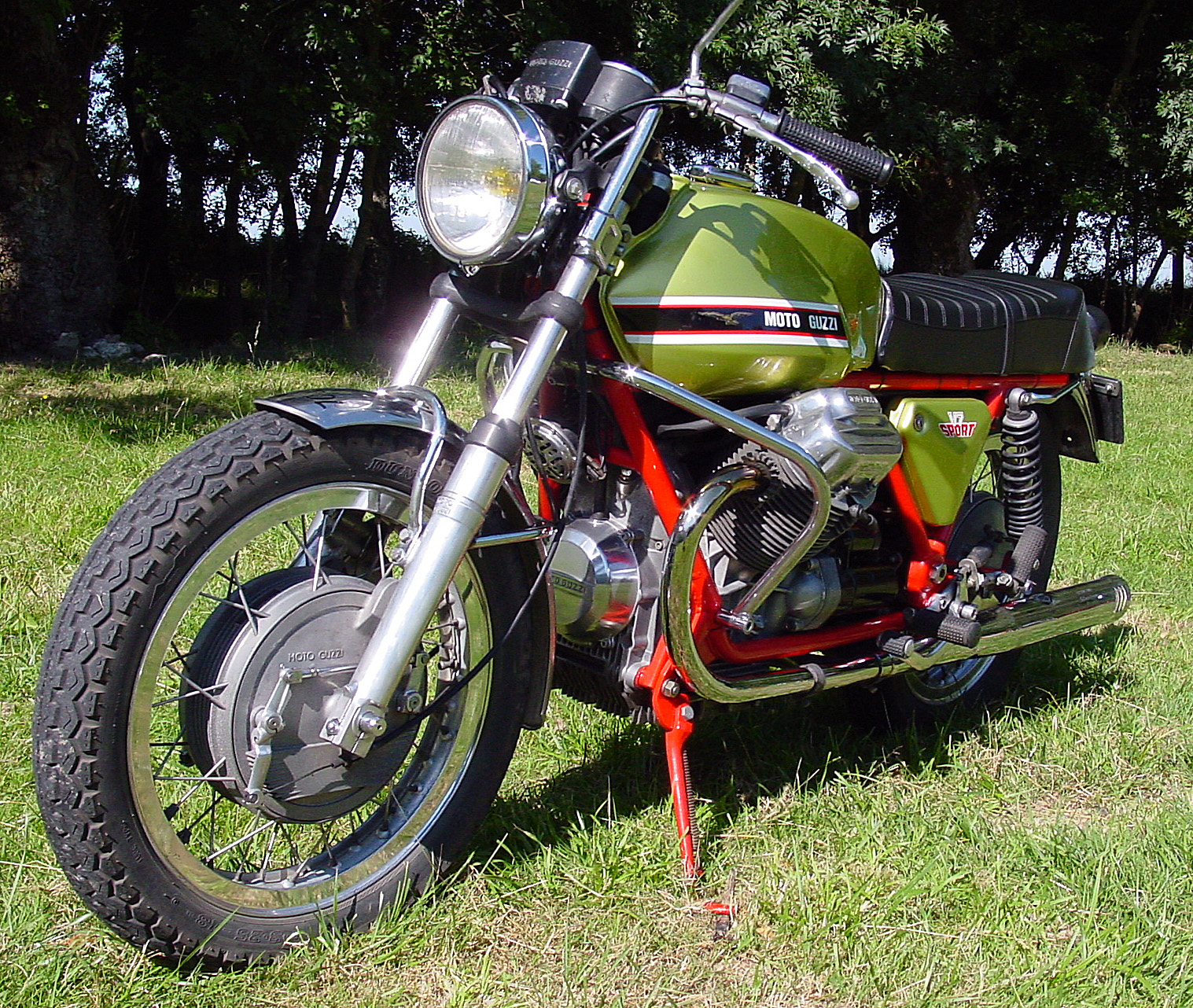
The Tonti frame stands out in red on this 1972 V7 Sport

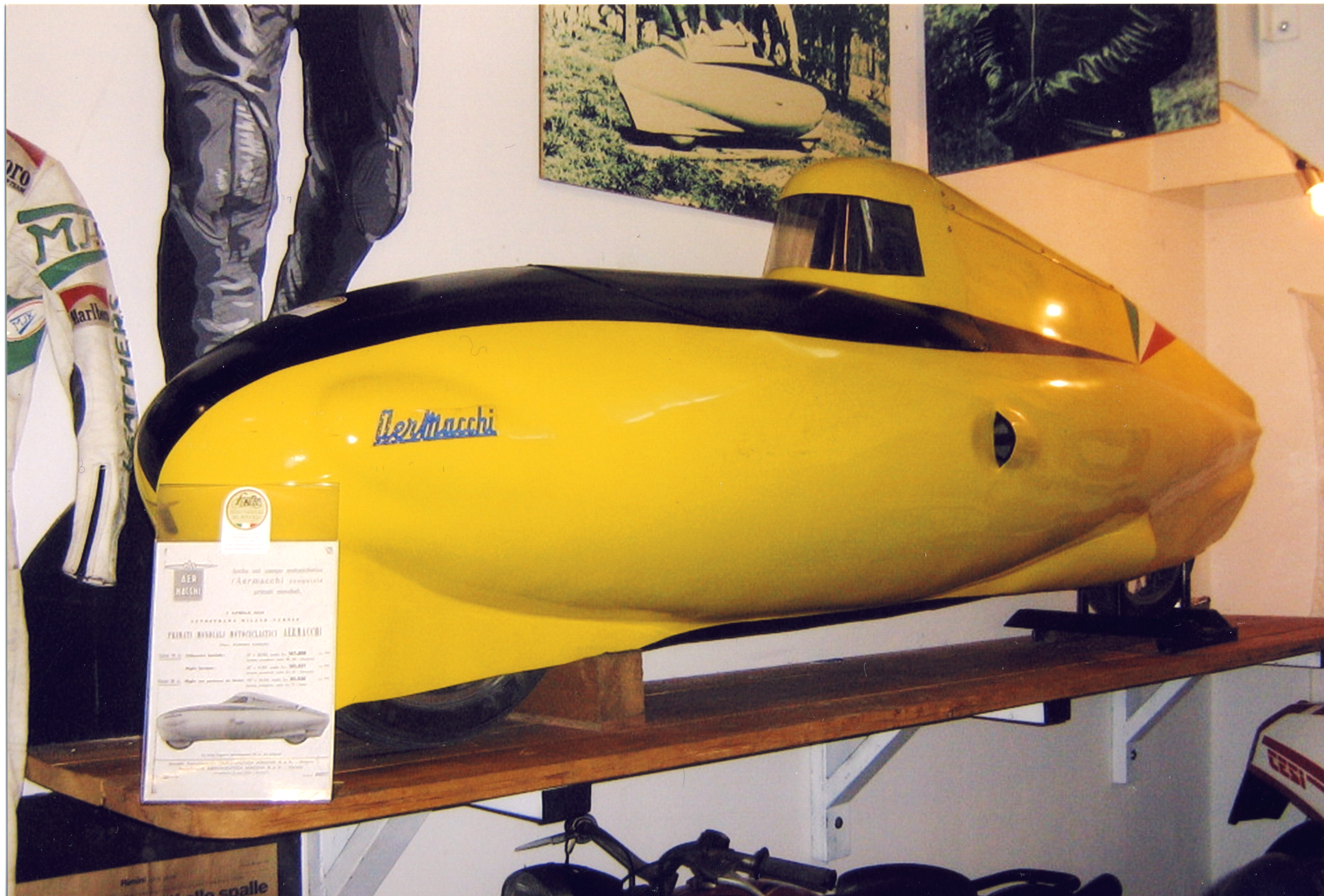
1955 LinTo-Aermacchi Record

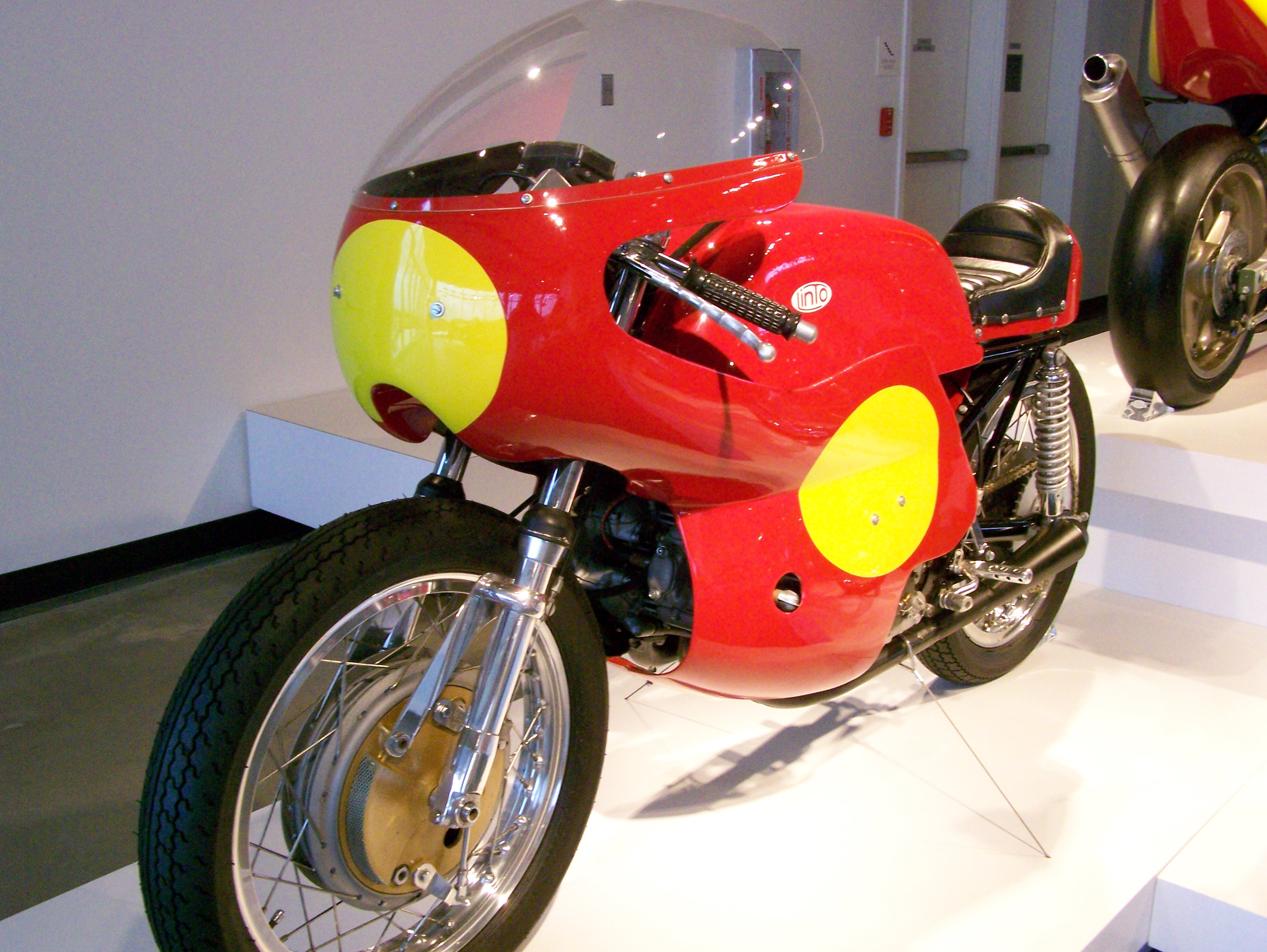
1969 Linto 500GP

Lino Tonti (September 16, 1920 – June 8, 2002) was an Italian motorcycle engineer known for designing a number of sport and racing motorcycles in the 1950s and 1960s, and for creating his signature 'Tonti frame' for Moto Guzzi's 1971 V7 Sport, setting his stamp on all Moto Guzzis since.

== Career ==
Tonti's first job was at Benelli, where he worked on a road-racing supercharged four, and then after World War II he went to Aermacchi. In 1957 he went to work for Count Giuseppe Boselli at F.B. Mondial, and helped break MV Agusta's Moto GP dominance of lightweight Grand Prix motorcycle racing in that year. After Mondial made a secret deal with Gilera, Moto Guzzi, and MV Agusta to stop racing at the end of 1957, Tonti went to Bianchi where he designed 250 cc four-stroke twins.

Lino Tonti joined Moto Guzzi in 1967 to replace Carcano. There he developed the V7 Sport and the small-block V50.

In the 1970s, Tonti helped his longtime friend Reno Leoni in his efforts to fit Ducati fork dampers in the Moto Guzzi racer he was campaigning in American AMA Superbike racing.

=== Linto racing motorcycle ===
In 1967, Tonti built the Linto Grand Prix racer with his assistant Alcide Biotti. The motorcycle was powered by a pair of 250cc Aermacchi-Harley Davidson four-stroke, single-cylinder engines joined. It was a six-speed pushrod straight-twin engine using the cylinders and heads from Aermacchi's horizontal single DS racer, combined with a new crankcase. The machine attained fourth place in the 1968 championship, and placed second in 1969, and continued to make appearances against more powerful two-strokes in 1970, 1971 and 1972.
