= Extreme commuting =

Commuting that takes more than daily walking time of an average human

As defined by the United States Census Bureau, an extreme commute is a daily journey to work that takes more than 90 minutes each way. According to the bureau, about 3% of American adult workers are so-called "extreme" commuters. The number of extreme commuters in the New York, Baltimore–Washington, San Francisco Bay Area, and Los Angeles metropolitan areas is much greater than the national average.

Midas sponsored an "America's Longest Commute" award in 2006. The winner, from Mariposa, California, drove a 372-mile (599 km) round trip (about 7 hours) to and from work in San Jose each day.

== United Kingdom ==
A survey over 2,000 British workers by Randstad NV revealed that 9% of British workers commute for over 90 minutes each way. 7.5% of the Survey's correspondents worked during their commute, with 18% of them believing that smartphones and tablets have made this easier.

A BBC article in 2013 highlighted multiple reasons for extreme commutes, including lifestyle choice (living in the country and pursuing a London career), relocation of employers, and people increasing their search area when looking for work after redundancy.

== China ==
As a result of China's rapid urbanization, cities have grown larger, but largely remained monocentric, increasing commute times drastically. According to a 2022 survey, many Chinese cities have high proportions of their population who commute an hour or more each day, including 30% of Beijingers, and 18% of Shanghainese. This has been attributed to inadequate transit expansion and job centralization. Chinese cities have been trying to build "15 minute cities" in polycentric areas, and improving public transit to address this.

== See also ==
- Reverse commute
- Super commuter
- Commuter worker, describing commuters who cross an international border
