= Super commuter =

Type of commuter

A super commuter is a person who works in the central county or downtown core of a metropolitan area and resides outside that metropolitan area.

In some metropolitan areas, costs of living are inhibitive to middle- and lower-income workers. As a result, some choose to live in more affordable metropolitan areas that are separate from the metropolitan area in which they work. Super commuters travel long distances, either daily, or once or twice a week between home and workplace either by air, rail, bus, and sometimes also by car, or a combination of modes. Often, super commuters spend most of the work week in the city their office is based, returning home on weekends.

Super commuters are generally younger in age than average workers, and tend to be from a middle class background. They are not elite business travellers; they try to cut their costs by taking benefit of higher wages in one region and lower housing and transportation costs in the more affordable metropolitan area in which they reside.

A 2012 study by New York University's Rudin Center for Transportation Policy and Management showed that Manhattan alone had an existing population of 59,000 super commuters.

Some super commuters reside and work in separate metropolitan areas due to their relationships in which both partners are employed. One partner may be well-employed in one metropolitan area, while another has valuable employment in the other metropolitan area. Megan Bearce, a marriage and family therapist and author of the book named Super Commuter Couples: Staying Together When A Job Keeps You Apart refers that there were an estimated 3.42 million full-time workers who were super commuters in 2012 in the U.S. The phenomenon has been getting increasing coverage on media.

== Impact on personal and social life ==
A study in the Netherlands on commuter couples where 60 such couples were sampled and interviewed found that 30 of those agreed with each other on having no alternative to living in dual locations. Their experience stated that they had no other realistic solution at the time when they decided to live in commuter partnership with each other. Another study suggests that learning to adjust to quirks of commuting and managing stress with a partner might be a mandatory bump in the road to success.

== See also ==
- Extreme commuting
- Reverse commute
- Commuter worker, describing commuters who cross an international border
