= Andy Goldfine =

American businessman

- Born: 1954 (age 70–71); Duluth, Minnesota
- Occupation: Businessperson
- Known for: Aerostich founder

Andy Goldfine (born 1954), is an American businessperson, founder of Aerostich, and founder of Ride To Work nonprofit to support motorcycle commuting through its annual Ride To Work Day. In 2013, he was awarded the American Motorcyclist Association (AMA) Dud Perkins Lifetime Achievement Award for his "generous and tireless support of motorcycling" with his business and nonprofit activities, and contributions as an AMA board member. In 2016, he was named Motorcyclist of the Year by Motorcyclist magazine.

== Motorcycle apparel career ==
Goldfine created the Aerostich Roadcrafter suit c. 1982, noted as "the first synthetic textile armored riding suit", made with Cordura and "worn by almost every motorcycle journalist when they're really riding". Goldfine has been called "one of the early leaders and innovators in motorcycle safety clothing", and "a revolutionary — a guy who changed the motorcycling world". Cycle World said "if there is ever a motorcycle gear hall of fame, Andy Goldfine should be inducted."

Author Melissa Holbrook Pierson has noted Goldfine's contribution to motorcycling by holding that it is a social good, and he has been cited as an expert on motorcycling culture as expressed through rider clothing.

In 1996, Goldfine undertook a 17,000-mile (27,000 km) long-distance motorcycling journey from his home city, Duluth MN, to Mongolia, crossing Siberia and returning via China and Japan. This ride with partner Helge Pedersen was part of a much longer journey Pedersen took, documented in his book 10 Years on 2 Wheels.

On March 1, 1994, Goldfine and his friend, Jeff Hofslund, rode from Duluth, MN across the western end of frozen Lake Superior to Sand Point, WI, near Red Cliff, WI and back to Duluth.

== Bibliography ==
- Wartenberg, H. von, D’Orléans, P., Egan, P., Goldfine, A., & Nichols, D. (2021). The riders: Motorcycle adventurers, cruisers, outlaws, and racers the world over. Motorbooks, an imprint of The Quarto Group.
- Thompson, Steven L.; Goldfine, Andy (2008), Bodies in Motion: Evolution and Experience in Motorcycling, Aero Design, ISBN 978-0981900117 (foreword)

== Notes ==
=== Sources ===
- 2013 AMA Awards acknowledge outstanding motorcyclists, American Motorcyclist Association, March 6, 2013
- Wood, Bill (June 2003), "Cordura Commando", American Motorcyclist, American Motorcyclist Association: 49–52
- "Evaluation: Aerostich DarienLight", Cycle World, July 2009
- Pierson, Melissa Holbrook (2011), The Man who Would Stop at Nothing, Norton, ISBN 9780393083262
- Gustafson, Kristi L. (July 23, 2006), "After 50 years, the classic biker look still has a lot of traction", Albany Times Union – via Chicago Tribune
- Anderson, Steve (January 2006), "Modern Armor", Cycle World
- Gardiner, Mark (May 15, 2014), Backmarker: Ride to Work-Day, Motorcycle USA
- Ferrar, Ann (June 13, 2004), "Keeping motorcyclists safe and sound: Loud, durable suits help riders stand out in the crowd", The New York Times – via Chicago Tribune
- Pedersen, Helge (2009), Far East Asia, Globeriders Inc.
- Goldfine, Andy (September 12–13, 2006), "Statement of Mr. Andy Goldfine" (PDF), Public Forum on Motorcycle Safety, National Transportation Safety Board
- Tesch, Bernd (May 11, 2014), Asien-Motorrad-Reisen [Asia by Motorcycle]
