= Commuting =

Regular travel to and from work

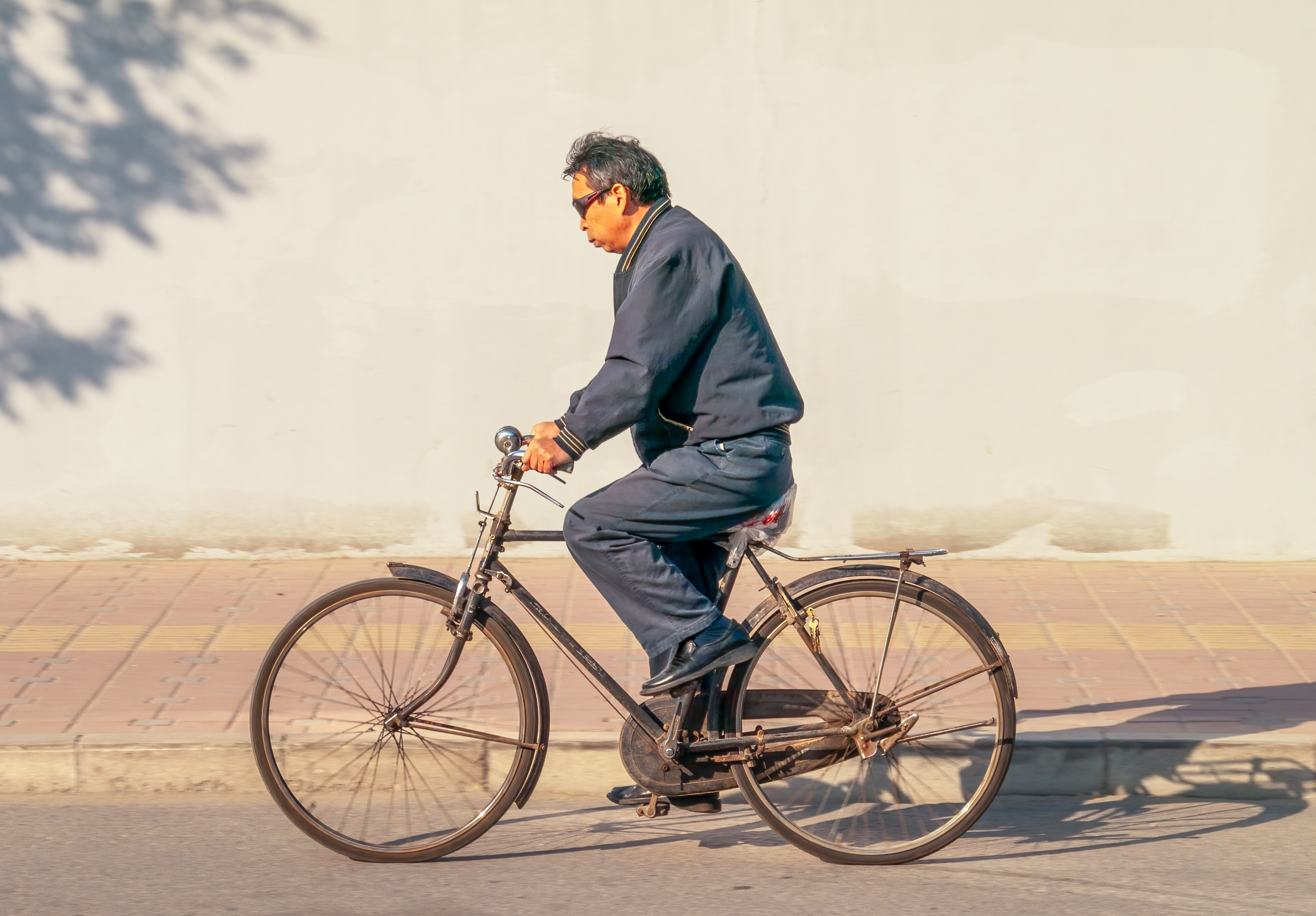
Cycling as a form of commuting

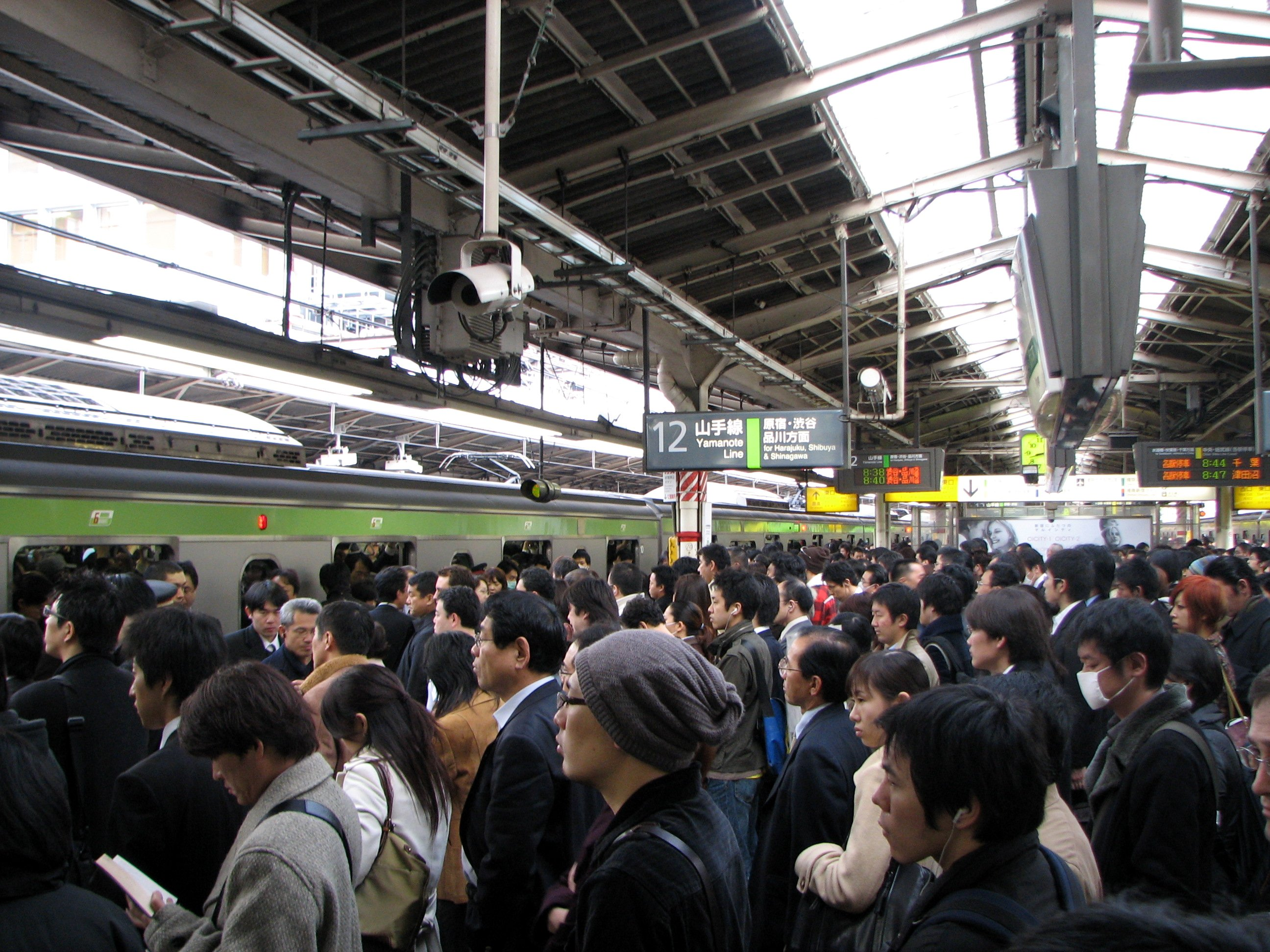
Rush hour at Shinjuku Station, Tokyo

Commuting is periodically recurring travel between a place of residence and place of work or study, where the traveler, referred to as a commuter, leaves the boundary of their home community. By extension, it can sometimes be any regular or often repeated travel between locations, even when not work-related. The modes of travel, time taken and distance traveled in commuting varies widely across the globe. Most people in least-developed countries continue to walk to work. The cheapest method of commuting after walking is usually by bicycle, so this is common in low-income countries but is also increasingly practised by people in wealthier countries for environmental, health, and often time reasons. In middle-income countries, motorcycle commuting is very common.

The next technology adopted as countries develop is more dependent on location: in more populous, older cities, especially in Eurasia mass transit (rail, bus, etc.) predominates, while in smaller, younger cities, and large parts of North America and Australasia, commuting by personal automobile is more common. A small number of very wealthy people, and those working in remote locations around the world, also commute by air travel, often for a week or more at a time rather than the more typical daily commute. High-speed rail has enabled both daily and weekly commuting across larger distances, giving rise to super commuters. Transportation links that enable commuting also impact the physical layout of cities and regions, allowing a distinction to arise between mostly-residential suburbs and the more economically focused urban core of a city (process known as suburban sprawl), but the specifics of how that distinction is realized remain drastically different between societies, with Eurasian "suburbs" often being more densely populated than North American "urban cores". Commuters often cross administrative boundaries, be they municipal, county, state/province or even national. In fact in countries like Germany the legal definition of "commuter" requires them to cross at least one municipal boundary on their way to work. The European Union's freedom of movement combined with good cross-border infrastructure (e.g. the Strasbourg tramway crossing into neighboring Germany) allows for a significant number of international commutes.

== History ==
The first separation between workplace and place of residence occurred as a result of the invention of the steam railway. The word commuter derives from the early days of rail travel in US cities, such as New York, Philadelphia, Boston and Chicago, where, in the 1840s, the railways engendered suburbs from which travelers paid a reduced or 'commuted' fare into the city. Later, the back formations "commute" and "commuter" were coined therefrom. Commuted tickets would usually allow the traveler to repeat the same journey as often as they liked during the period of validity: normally, the longer the period the cheaper the cost per day.

Before the 19th century, most workers lived less than an hour's walk from their work. The Industrial Revolution brought specialization of work and workplaces, and relocated most paid work from households and rural areas to factories in urban areas. Today, many people travel daily to work a long way from their own towns, cities, and villages, especially in industrialised societies. Depending on factors such as the high cost of housing in city centres, lack of public transit, and traffic congestion, modes of travel may include automobiles, motorcycles, trains, aircraft, buses, and bicycles. Where Los Angeles is infamous for its automobile gridlock, commuting in New York is closely associated with the subway. In London and Tokyo and several European cities, "commuter" is automatically associated with rail passengers. According to journey-to-work studies, high wage workers, as well as men working in managerial employment, have longer journey-times than other workers. Studies also found that in the past, the use of public transport has increased the time spent every day on the journey-to-work.

== Suburbs and the commuter towns ==
Commuting has had a large impact on modern life. It has allowed cities to grow to sizes that were previously not practical, and it has led to the proliferation of suburbs. Many large cities or conurbations are surrounded by commuter belts, also known as metropolitan areas, commuter towns, dormitory towns, or bedroom communities. The prototypical commuter lives in one of these areas and travels daily to work or to school in the core city.

As urban sprawl pushes further and further away from central business districts, new businesses can appear in outlying cities, leading to the existence of the reverse commuter who lives in a core city but works in the suburbs, and to a type of secondary commuter who lives in a more distant exurb and works in the outlying city or industrial suburb.

Depending on local taxation laws, commuting can lead to significant issues with municipal finances. Commuters work in one municipality while residing in another. As taxes are usually paid based on place of residence, the suburbs receive tax revenue from economic activity occurring in the central city. Meanwhile commuters often also use public infrastructure of the central city outside the immediate work and commuting context. One potential way to remedy the issue is to annex the commuter suburbs into the central city. However, depending on local laws, this may be legally difficult or impossible or politically unpalatable. Another potential measure is for municipalities to receive equalization payments so that "rich" municipalities pay a certain share of their tax revenue to "poor" municipalities.

== Gender differences ==
A UK study, published in 2009, found that on average women suffer four times as much psychological stress from their work commute as men do. An Indian study conducted in Mangalore led by Edmond Fernandes stated that creating a gender sensitive commuter-centric road safety policy requires to be developed to protect women while commuting as they felt stressed and scared to travel alone, particularly at night.

== Education ==
Institutions that have few dormitories or low or no student housing populations are called commuter schools in the United States, like community colleges.

== Traffic ==
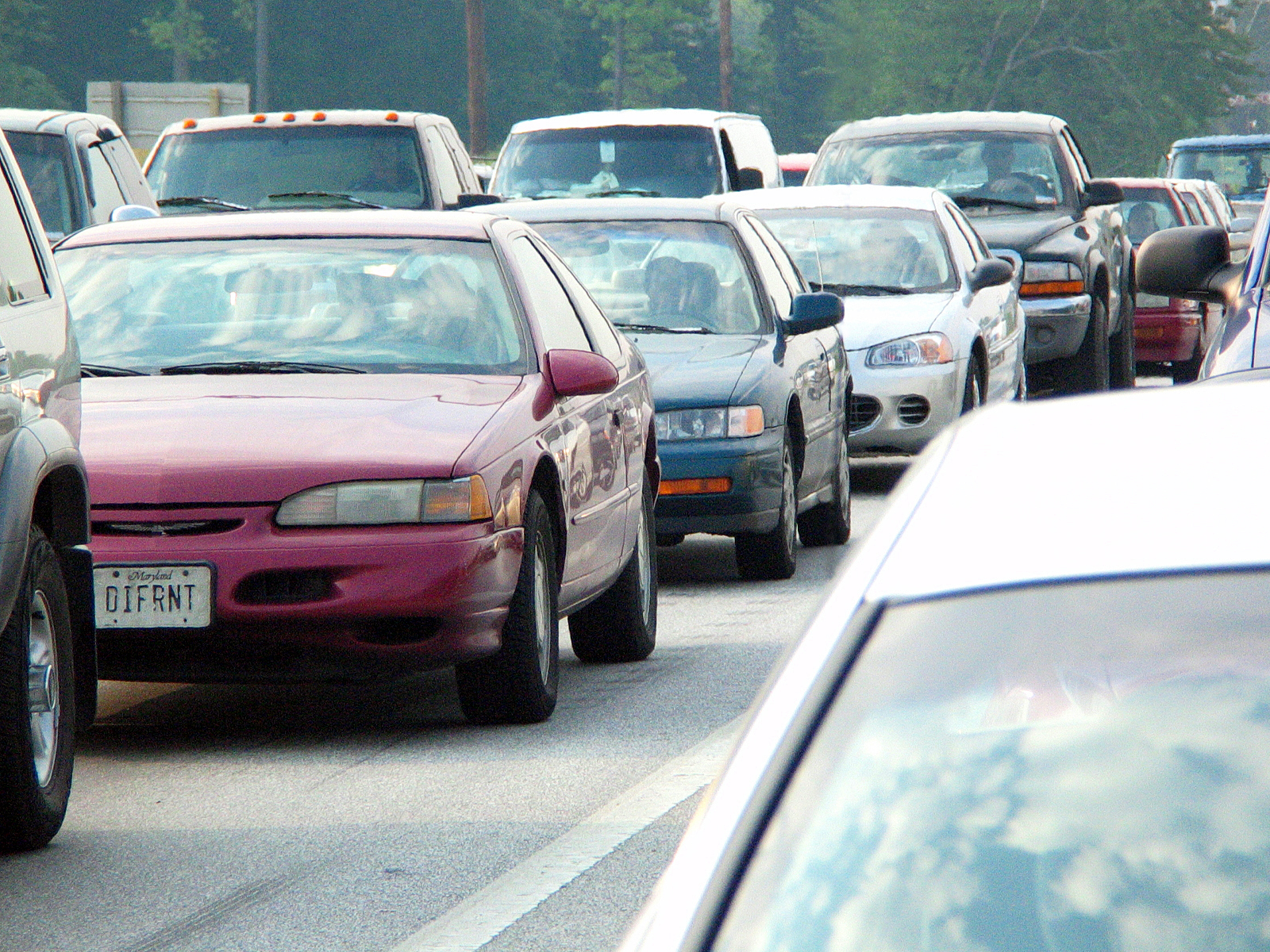
Traffic jam in Baltimore, Maryland

Most commuters travel at the same time of day, resulting in the morning and evening rush hours, with congestion on roads and public transport systems not designed or maintained well enough to cope with the peak demands. As an example, Interstate 405 located in Southern California is one of the busiest freeways in the United States. Commuters may sit up to two hours in traffic during rush hour. Construction work or collisions on the freeway distract and slow down commuters, contributing to even longer delays.

== Pollution ==
Cars carrying only one occupant use fuel and roads less efficiently than shared cars or public transport, and increase traffic congestion. Commuting by car is a major factor contributing to air pollution. Carpool lanes can help commuters reach their destinations more quickly, encourage people to socialize, and spend time together, while reducing air pollution. Some governments and employers have introduced employee travel reduction programs that encourage such alternatives as carpooling and remote work. Some are also carpooling using Internet sites to save money. Alternatives like personal rapid transit have also been proposed to reap the energy-efficiency benefits of a mass transit system while maintaining the speed and convenience of individual transport.

Traffic emissions, such as from cars and trucks, also contribute. Airborne by-products from vehicle exhaust systems cause air pollution and are a major ingredient in the creation of smog in some large cities. The major culprits from transportation sources are carbon monoxide (CO), nitrogen oxides (NO and NO_{x}), volatile organic compounds, sulfur dioxide, and hydrocarbons. Hydrocarbons are the main components of petroleum fuels such as gasoline and diesel fuel. These molecules react with sunlight, heat, ammonia, moisture, and other compounds to form the noxious vapours, ground level ozone, and particles that comprise smog.

Electric rail based options like trams, commuter rail, S-Bahn or subways drastically reduce pollution in urban areas as well as overall as electric traction is much more efficient than internal combustion engines. However, especially in the confined space of underground metro stations, localized air pollution from particulate matter produced by wear and tear on breaks, wheels, rails etc. can reach significant and potentially harmful levels.

== Social trends ==
=== Commuting trends in the United States ===
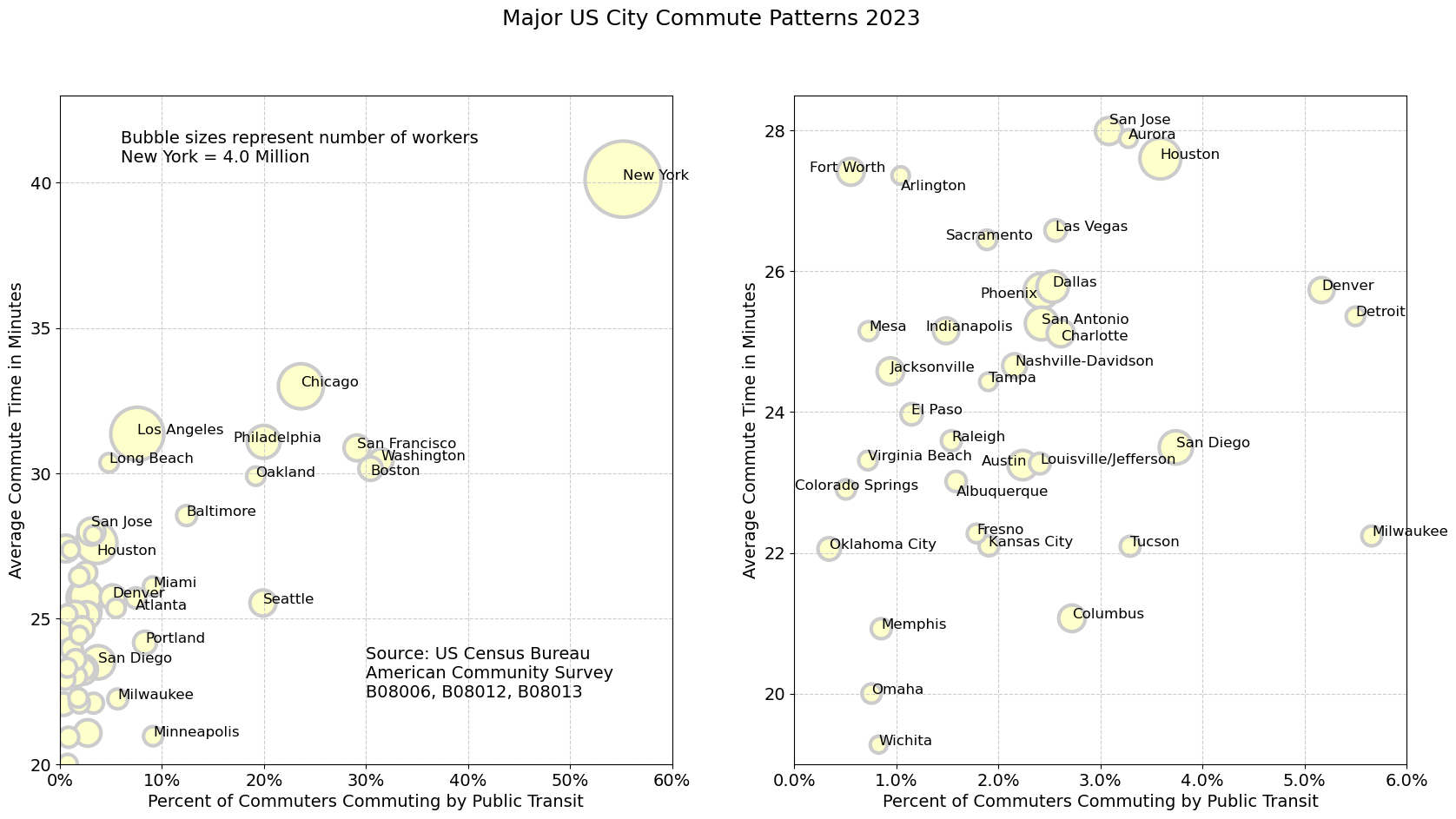
Commuting times and patterns in US cities, 2023 US Census data

In the United States, the Census Bureau's American Community Survey (ACS) collects data on commuting times, allowing an analysis of average commute time by industry, location, and vehicle. According to the 2014 ACS, the average commute time for adults in the United States was 26.8 minutes.

The occupations with the longest commutes were Construction and Mining (33.4 minutes), Computer Science and Math (31.8), and Business Operations Specialists (30.2), while those in the military had the shortest commute (21). In general, urban and suburban workers in the US have similar commute times (about 30 minutes), while rural workers have significantly shorter commutes (22.6 minutes).

In the US, over 90% of workers commute by car, while about 5% commute by public transportation. Statistical models indicate that in addition to demographics and work duration, commute time is one of the most important determinants of discretionary time allocation by individuals.

=== Commuting College Students ===
The number of students who commute to college continues to increase significantly as the years go by. From 1996 to 2006 alone, the percentage of undergraduate students who commuted to campus began to increase at a rate of 30% to 50%. By 2009 the percentage of students in the United States who commute to college or university was 85%

In a study involving 10 universities in Canada, 61% of students reported that their commute was a challenge to campus participation, while 30% perceived it as a barrier to academic success. Factors influencing satisfaction included commute mode, duration, travel attitudes, and campus type. Notably, 72% of students had one-way commutes of one hour or less, 22% had commutes lasting between 60 and 90 minutes, and 9% faced commutes exceeding 90 minutes.

=== Commuting and the scarcity of local employment ===
Commuting is often made necessary due to local employment market factors which may stem from the decline of manufacturing (i.e., in cities where large manufacturing employers have either closed or laid off workers, with no other employers to absorb that loss) and, in general, the sheer lack of local employment. More specifically, wages from local employers are often insufficient for a worker household to sustain itself. As a result, the needs of worker households must be sustained and this leads to a wider field of job search beyond a local area to the next nearest city or metropolitan area, resulting in the requirement for commuting. Hence, in areas where little or no transit options exist that can facilitate a journey to work to meet the requirements of a worker schedule, the use of a car is therefore made necessary. This is a personal choice driven by financial need.

=== Social and health implications of commuting ===
Since commuting largely stems from a need to travel outside a home community to sustain a household income while facing a bleak local employment market, this comes with additional social and health implications. First, there is the increased risk of injury and accident while driving as distance and time in the vehicle increases, which is generally observed when operating a vehicle. Fatigue and hazardous road conditions add to this risk. Second, while income from employment is greater in other cities, stress from commuting factors become a factor for personal health. Ironically, stress from having to locate employment or being placed in a low-income situation might lead to a similar outcome. However, this is dichotomous with the satisfaction of a sustainable income and good employment, which is clearly the goal of an individual who is faced with commuting. Research has found that cities hosting large numbers of inbound commuters tend to experience higher rates of property crime, linking commuting patterns to urban crime. Beyond physical stress long distance commuting is associated with a decrease as individuals have less time to engage on on-campus activities. Research suggests that for every ten minutes added to a commute there is a decline in social connections and civic participation.

== See also ==
- Commuter rail – Passenger rail transport services primarily within metropolitan areas
- Commuter worker – Workers who commute from Mexico to the US
- Health and environmental effects of transport
- Extreme commuting – Commuting that takes more than daily walking time of an average human
- Hypermobility (travel) – Act of taking frequent trips
- Marchetti's constant – Average commuting time
- Motorcycle commuting
- Reverse commute – Commute in an opposite direction from normal
- Slugging – Informal carpools for commuting
- Standing passenger – Passengers who remain standing during public transport
- Student transport – Transport for children to and from schools and events
- Transit-oriented development – Urban planning prioritising transit
- Urban planning – Technical process of land use and urban design
