= List of Dud Perkins Award winners =

The Dud Perkins Lifetime Achievement Award was established by the American Motorcyclist Association in January 1970. Among several AMA awards established for "significant contributions to American motorcycling", the Dud Perkins Award holds the top honor for "the highest level of service" to motorcyclists. It is named for the first awardee, Motorcycle Hall of Fame inductee Dudley "Dud" Perkins.

- 2016: Craig Vetter
- 2014: Mike and Margaret Wilson
- 2013: Andy Goldfine
- 2012: Jerry Abboud
- 2004: Dave Despain
- 2002: Patty Mills
- 2000: Jim Hutzler and Carl Reynolds
- 1998: Jim Nickerson
- 1997: Trevor Deeley
- 1996: Woody Leone Sr. and Bill Boyce
- 1995: Dick Mann
- 1994: Dave & Rita Coombs and Mike Farabaugh
- 1993: Charlie & Joan Watson and Chuck & Sharon Clayton
- 1991: Bob Frink
- 1990: Roger Hull, Harold Farnam & Roxy Rockwood
- 1989: Stan & Dorothy Miles
- 1988: Joe Christian
- 1987: Bee Gee & Duke Pennell and John & Bonnie Burnside
- 1986: Hap Jones and Floyd "Pop" Dreyer
- 1985: Bill Bagnall
- 1984: Jim Davis
- 1983: J. C. "Pappy" Hoel & Earl & Lucille Flanders
- 1982: Al Eames
- 1981: Lin Kuchler
- 1980: Horace Fritz
- 1979: Earl and Dot Robinson
- 1978: Reggie Pink
- 1977: J. R. Kelley
- 1976: John Harley
- 1975: Bruce Walters
- 1973: William S. Harley
- 1972: Tom Sifton
- 1971: Soichiro Honda
- 1970: Dudley "Dud" Perkins
