= Motorcycle commuting =

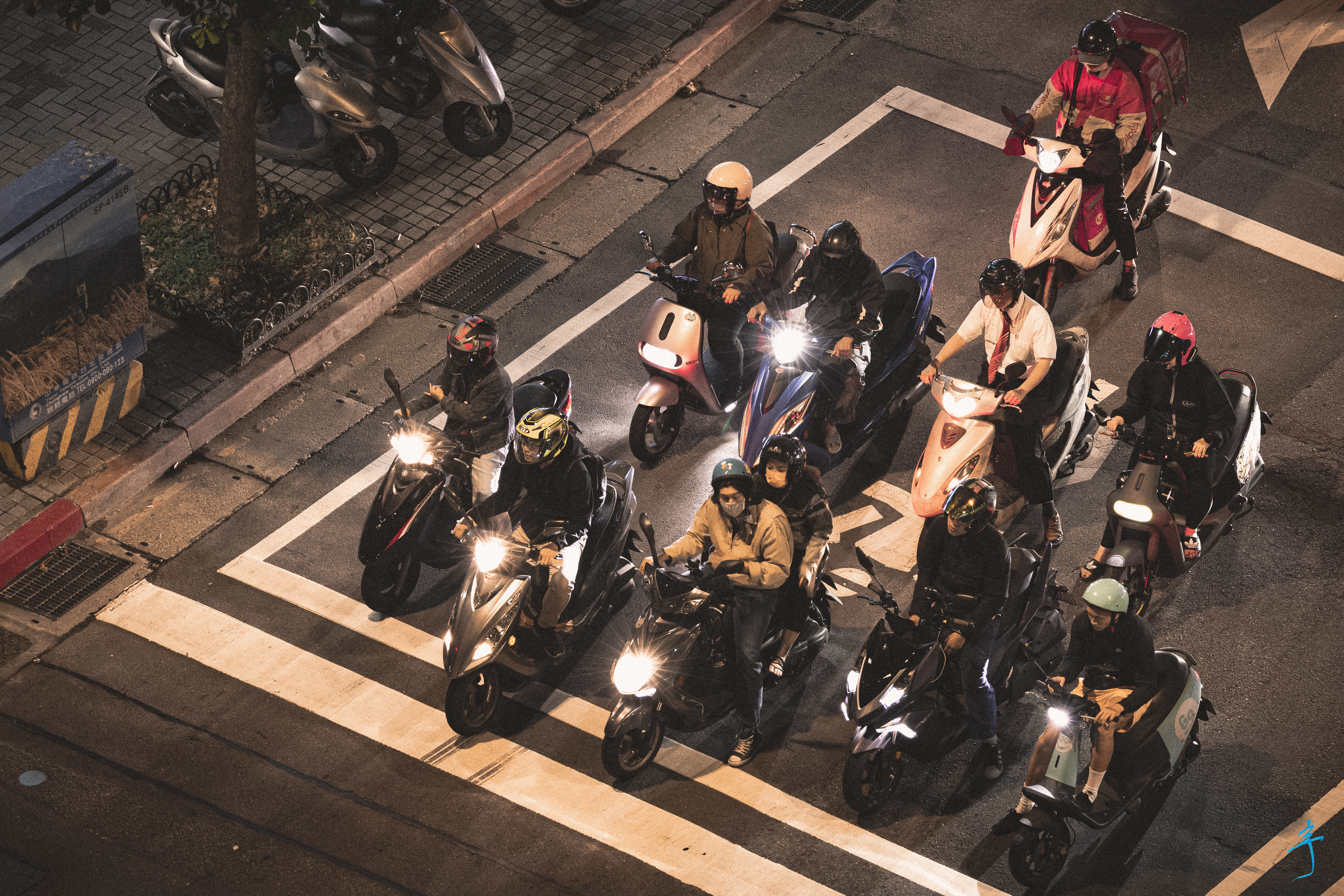
A group of people are commuting to their home by using motorcycles in Taipei (2021)

Motorcycle commuting is a commuting alternative to buses, trains and cars. The term includes a number of two wheel motor vehicles including scooters, minibikes, monkey bikes and motorcycles.

== Taiwan ==
Motorcycles are the primary means of commuting in Taiwan. According to a survey conducted by the Ministry of Transportation and Communications, at least four in ten Taiwanese people use motorcycles, including for public transport. In a survey conducted by the Taipei City government, nearly three in ten commuters use motorcycles for commuting, including for public transport as well. In cities south of Taoyuan, the number increased to seven in ten when considering non-public transport, making motorcycles the most adopted commuting technology in Taiwan. The Taipei City government reports that the average cost of motorcycle commuting is 32.3 TWD, with an average duration of 24.5 minutes. The Taichung City government describes motorcycle commuting as "higher flexibity with lower cost", citing it as the main reason for its popularity in Taiwan.

== United Kingdom ==
In London, England, powered two-wheelers (PTWs) increased by 40% between 1997 and 2007. About 16,000 PTWs rode into London by 2007.

Due to revenue raising objectives, Westminster Council (London) began charging motorcycles to park by 2007. Many groups stand for the motorcyclist and PTW users and they are actively lobbying Westminster Council to try to persuade them not to pursue charging for motorcycle parking.

== United States ==
In the United States, many individuals commute by motorcycle. Ride To Work Inc. is a national organization that encourages motorcycle commuting. Its annual Ride To Work day, the United States' largest motorcycle event by number of participants, is designed to promote two-wheel travel and to provide information about motorcyclists.
