= Aerostich =

American motorcycle equipment company

Aero Design & Mfg. Co.
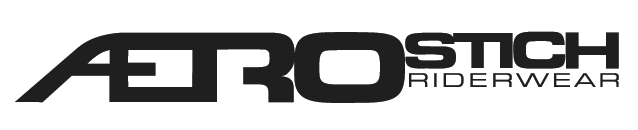
- Company type: Sole proprietorship
- Industry: Catalog/Online Retail, Clothing Design & Manufacturing
- Founded: 1983
- Founder: Andy Goldfine
- Headquarters: Duluth, Minnesota
- Area served: US & Canada, ships worldwide
- Key people: Andy Goldfine
- Products: Motorcycle rider suits & accessories
- Services: Suit alteration & repair
- Owner: Andy Goldfine
- Number of employees: 100 (2004)
- Website: www.aerostich.com

Aero Design & Mfg. Co., doing business as Aerostich Riderwear, is a company based in Duluth, Minnesota that produces and sells motorcycle safety clothing and other motorcycle related equipment, such as GPS systems, luggage, and hand tools. It was founded in 1983 by Andy Goldfine, who is also the founder of the nonprofit Ride To Work, Inc. and was elected to a third three-year term as an American Motorcyclist Association board member in 2008.

They are best known for the textile protective clothing they create, including the one-piece Roadcrafter suit and Darien jacket. Some track day organizations, such as NESBA, allow riders to use textile suits such as the Aerostich instead of full racing leathers.

The company was founded to produce a new design for armored all-weather protective clothing, combining lightweight abrasion-resistant Cordura® nylon, breathable-waterproof Gore-Tex laminates, tape-sealed waterproof seams, multiple zippered airflow vents, large areas of reflective material, 'viscoelastic' energy-absorbing impact armor (a tempered slow-recovery foam), ergonomic pocketing, and highly water-resistant zippers. These components had never previously been combined for use in motorcycle rider's gear.

By the end of the 1980s, Aerostich's one-piece Roadcrafter suit had become the benchmark which helped make synthetic armored textile rider's gear broadly market-acceptable. The company's product range expanded later with products for touring, adventure, and dual-sport riding applications.

Other influential and pioneering products included the first advanced-technology adventure touring and off-road oriented Darien jacket and pant (1987), the first use of the color high-vis lime-yellow in rider's gear (1999), the first breathable-waterproof three-digit glove raincovers (2000), the first electrically heated bib mid-layer (2009) and the first breathable-waterproof leather riding suit (2010).

In 2016, Aerostich founder Andy Goldfine was named Motorcyclist of the Year by Motorcyclist Magazine.

The Aerostich catalog has been noted for listing humorous fake products, such as a "magnetic baby onesie" for attaching infants to a motorcycle, often at incredibly high prices.

== See also ==
- Motorcycle armor
