= Santiago Herrero =

Spanish motorcycle racer

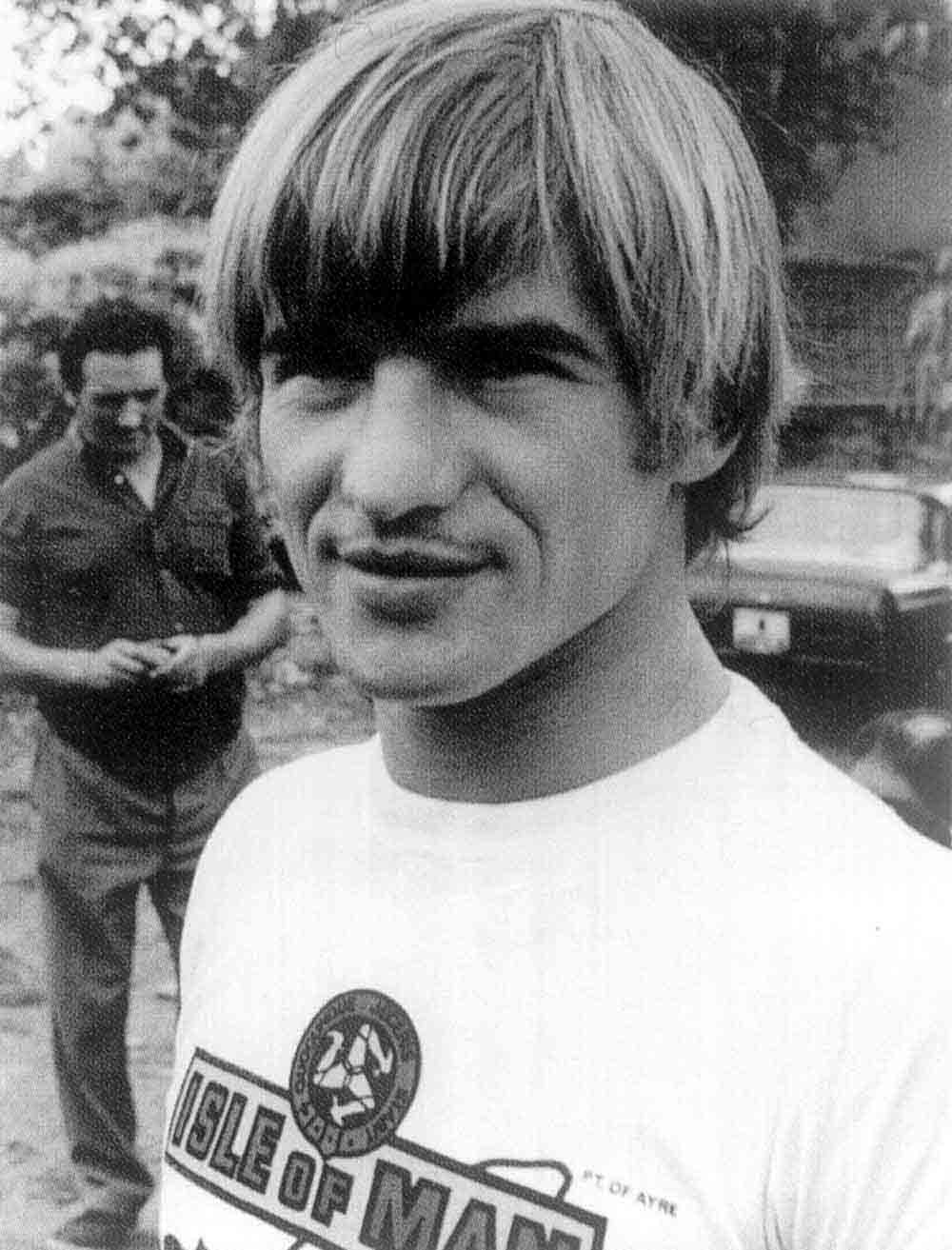
- Herrero in 1969
- Nationality: Spanish
Motorcycle racing career statistics
Grand Prix motorcycle racing
Active years	1968 – 1970
First race	1968 250cc West German Grand Prix
Last race	1970 Isle of Man TT
First win	1969 250cc Spanish Grand Prix
Last win	1970 250cc Yugoslavian Grand Prix
Team	Ossa
Championships	0
Starts / Wins / Podiums / Poles / F. laps / Points; 17 / 4 / 11 / N/A / 3

Santiago Herrero Ruiz (9 May 1943 – 10 June 1970) was a Spanish professional motorcycle racer. He competed in the FIM Grand Prix motorcycle racing world championships from 1968 to 1970 as a member of the Ossa factory racing team. As Spain began to emerge from the Franco Era, Herrero became the country's most promising international motorcycle racer until he died from injuries sustained while competing in the 1970 Isle of Man TT race.

== Biography ==
Born in Madrid, Spain, Herrero bought his first motorcycle at the age of 12. In 1962, he obtained his racing license, competing on a Derbi and doing his own maintenance. He soon moved up to a Bultaco Tralla 125 and caught the eye of Luis Bejarano, the owner of Lube (a Spanish motorcycle marque) who recognized Herrero's talent. Bejarano offered him a job in the company's competition department. In 1964, Herrero finished in third place in the 125cc Spanish National Championship and in 1965, he finished in second. Unfortunately for Lube, the marque ran into financial difficulties and went out of business.

Herrero decided to go into business for himself, running a motorcycle repair shop in Bilbao. He purchased a Bultaco and competed as a privateer. Around this period, Eduardo Giró, lead designer of the Ossa motorcycle company developed a revolutionary bike with a monocoque chassis. Recognizing Herrero's riding talent as well as his mechanical skills, Giró offered him a job to develop the Ossa 250cc race bike. The Ossa's monocoque chassis' superior stiffness and lighter weight imbued it with exceptional cornering and braking abilities which, in turn allowed for faster cornering speeds than the competition. Together they won the 250cc Spanish National Championship in 1967.

=== Grand Prix championship ===
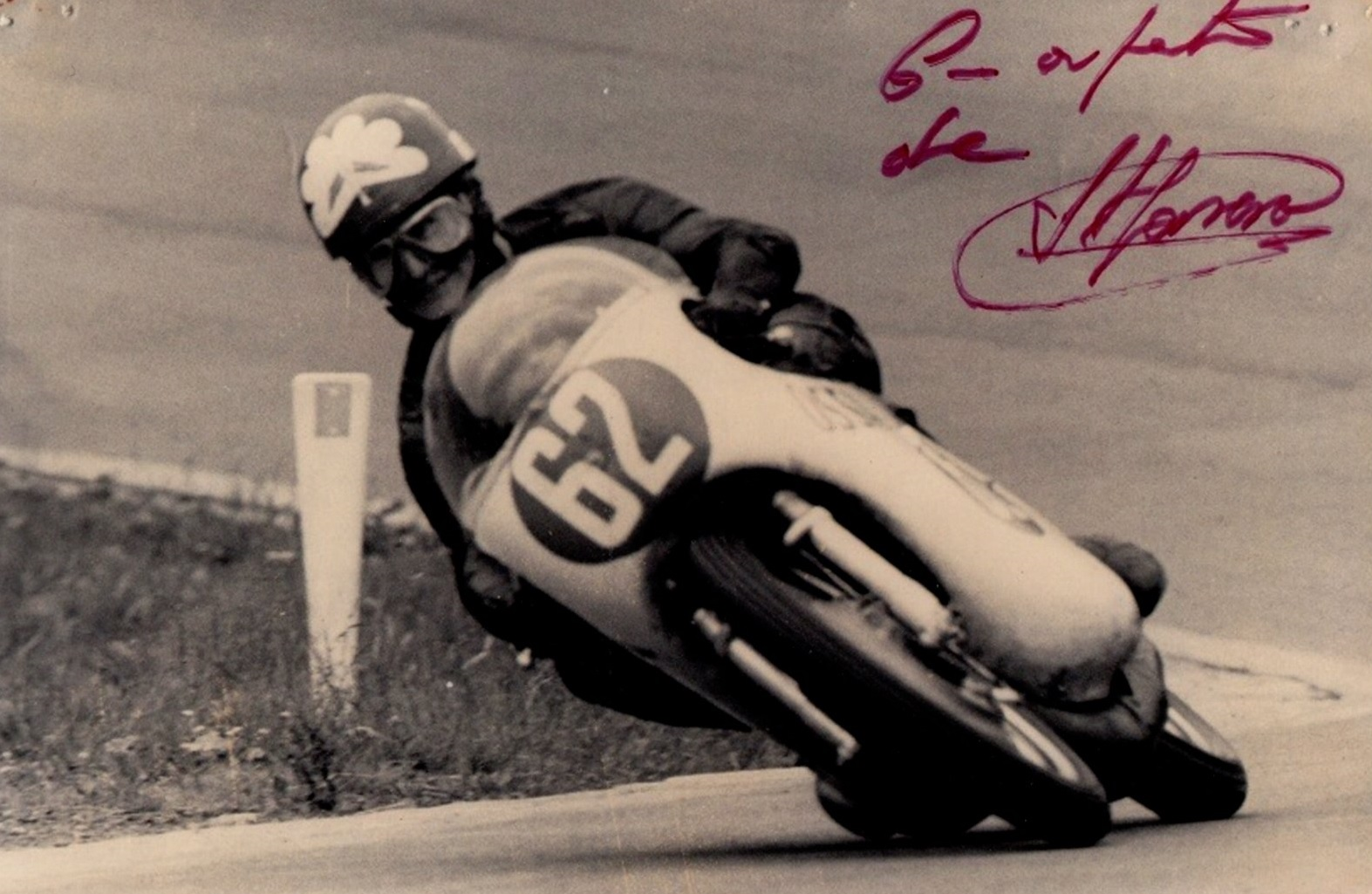
Herrero (62) competing in the 1968 Belgian Grand Prix.

In 1968, Herrero would move up to compete in the 250cc Grand Prix world championship. Although the single cylinder Ossa had 20 horsepower (15 kW) less than the powerful V4 Yamahas of Phil Read and Bill Ivy, the Ossa was 45 pounds (20 kg) lighter and its monocoque frame was much stiffer, giving it superior agility. Herrero was able to take advantage of the Ossa's light weight and superior handling characteristics to remain competitive, especially on tighter race tracks. The Yamahas swept the championship, but Herrero's results left no doubt that the little Ossa was quick and dependable. He finished seventh in the championship and claimed a third place in the final race of the season at Monza. He would once again take the 250cc Spanish National Championship.

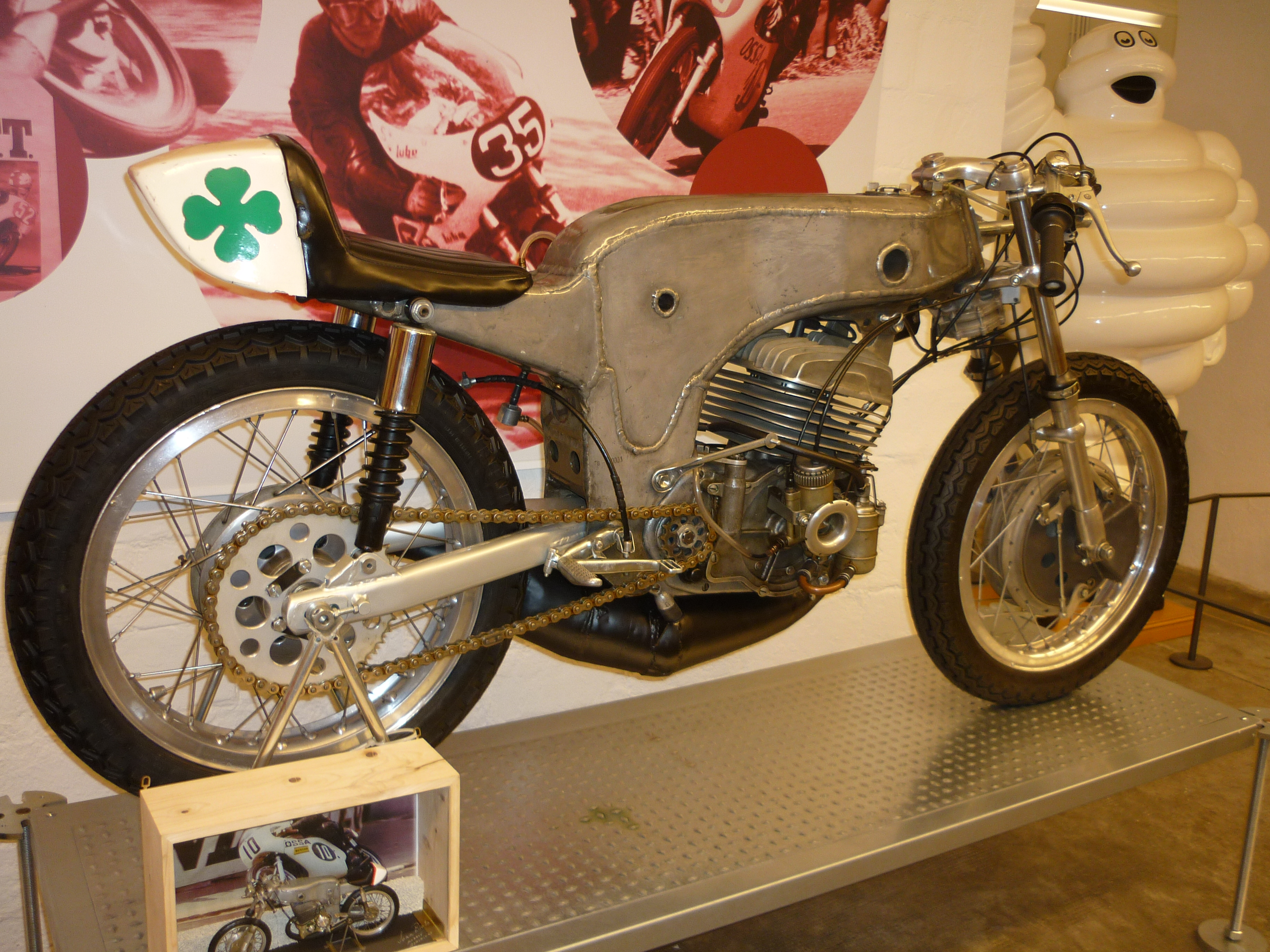
1968 Ossa 250 cc Grand Prix racer ridden by Herrero

In 1969, the FIM changed its regulations in an effort to reduce spiraling costs in motorcycle racing. 125cc and 250cc machines would be limited to two cylinders and 6-speed transmissions. This regulation change caused the dominant Yamaha and Suzuki factories to withdraw their teams from Grand Prix racing.

The 1969 Grand Prix season would be even more successful for Herrero. He began the year winning his first grand prix at the opening race of the season in front of his countrymen at Jarama. After retiring from the German Grand Prix with mechanical problems, he returned with a victory at Le Mans. He followed this with third place at the Isle of Man TT, a considerable accomplishment considering his horsepower deficit on the infamous Snaefell Mountain Course.

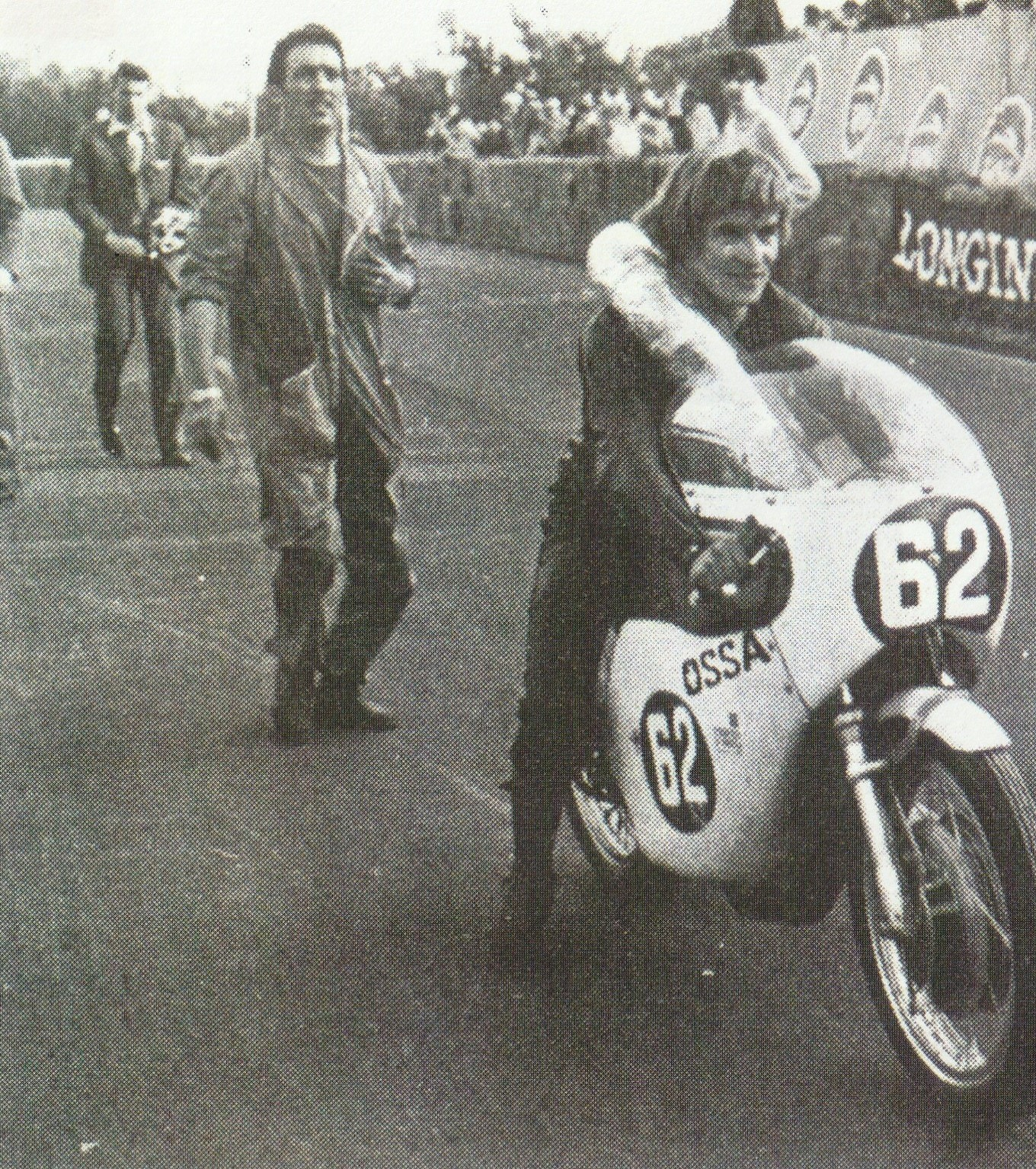
Herrero (62) wearing the winner's garland after his victory at the 1970 Yugoslavian Grand Prix.

He triumphed again at Spa and was leading the championship points race when he was beset by bad luck. He crashed in the rain at the Ulster Grand Prix and suffered a broken left arm. Most observers considered his championship hopes dashed, but Herrero showed true grit by coming back just three weeks later to finish in a remarkable fifth place at Imola. He held a one-point lead in the 250cc world championship going into the final race of the season, held at the dangerous Opatija street circuit in Yugoslavia. He started the race in the lead but crashed on the seventh lap, ending his championship hopes. He would finish third in the world championship. He repeated as Spanish 250cc champion for a third consecutive year.

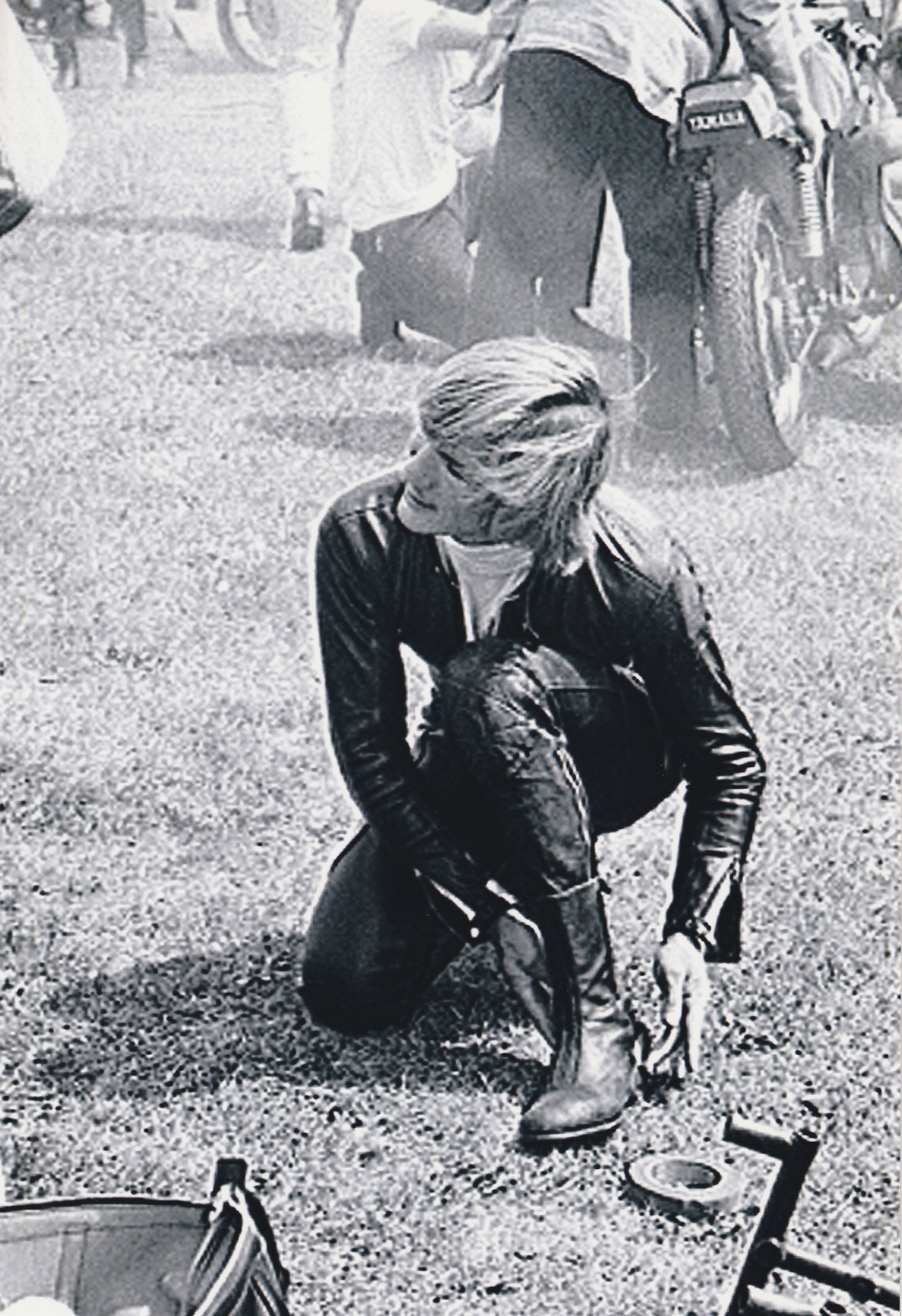
Herrero preparing for his final race at the 1970 Isle of Man TT.

Herrero got the 1970 season off to a promising start. Although, he retired from the first race of the season in Germany, he finished in second in the French Grand Prix and took a victory in Yugoslavia. The World Championship then moved to the treacherous Isle of Man venue for the 1970 Isle of Man TT. Herrero crashed at the 13th milestone (Westwood Corner), losing control of his motorcycle on melted tar during the sixth and final lap of the 250cc Lightweight TT. Despite a previous setback at Braddan Bridge when he went up the slip road and crashed, breaking his windscreen, he had battled back up to third place. Stan Woods, who had originally been reported to have collided with Herrero, actually crashed while trying to avoid him. As a result of the accident, Woods suffered a broken ankle and two broken collar-bones. Herrero died of irreversible shock and from his injuries two days later. He was 27 years old. The cause of the accident, described by Stanley Woods, "may have been melting tar on the bend." His loss affected the Ossa factory so much that they abandoned road racing altogether.

== Motorcycle Grand Prix results ==
**Position**	1	2	3	4	5	6	7	8	9	10
**Points**	15	12	10	8	6	5	4	3	2	1

(key) (Races in bold indicate pole position; races in italics indicate fastest lap)

Year	Class	Team	1	2	3	4	5	6	7	8	9	10	11	12	Points	Rank	Wins
1968	250cc	Ossa	GER; 6	ESP; DNF	IOM; DNF	NED; 6	BEL; 5	DDR; DNF	CZE -	FIN -	ULS -	NAT; 3			8	7th	0
1969	50 cc	Derbi	ESP -	GER -	FRA -		NED; 7	BEL; 2	DDR; 2	CZE -		ULS -	NAT -	YUG -	28	7th	0
1969	250cc	Ossa	ESP; 1	GER; DNF	FRA; 1	IOM; 3	NED; 3	BEL; 1	DDR; 2	CZE; DNF	FIN; 6	ULS; DNF	NAT; 5	YUG; DNF	83	3rd	3
1970	250cc	Ossa	GER; DNF	FRA; 2	YUG; 1	IOM; DNF	–	–	–	–	–	–	–	–	27	8th	1
