= Yankee (motorcycle) =

American-made motorcycle

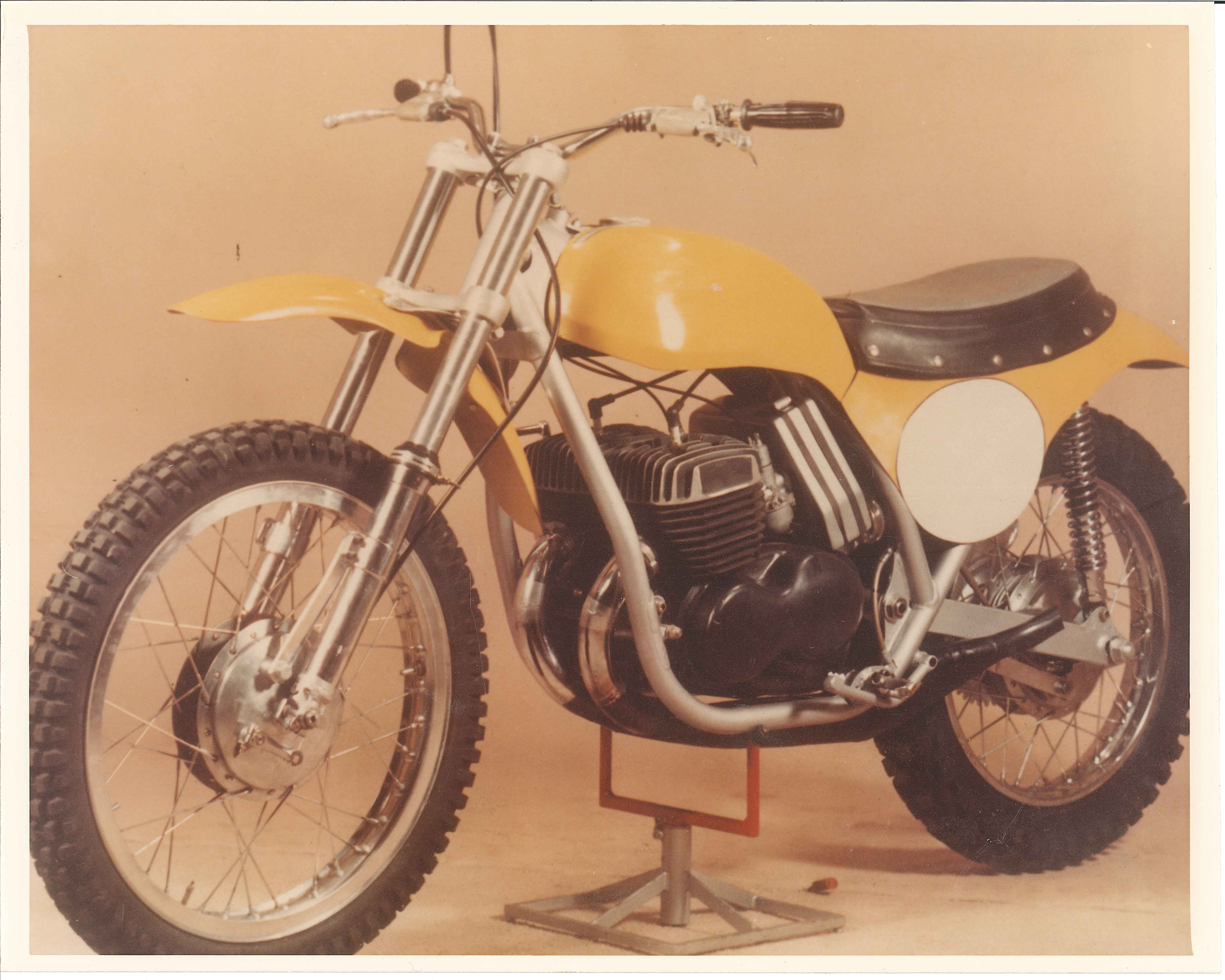
A 1968 Yankee prototype

The Yankee motorcycle is a motorcycle which was produced in Schenectady, New York by the Yankee Motor Company in the 1970s. This company was started by John Taylor, a long-time resident of that area.

The motorcycle used an air-cooled two-stroke engine, designed by Eduard Giró that was produced by the Ossa firm in Barcelona, Spain. The engine was a unique combination of two Ossa cylinders, that produced a twin-cylinder engine of near 500 cc capacity. The Yankee frame, designed with help from Dick Mann, and running gear were produced in the US, and the entire motorcycle was assembled in the Yankee plant on Campbell Avenue in Schenectady.

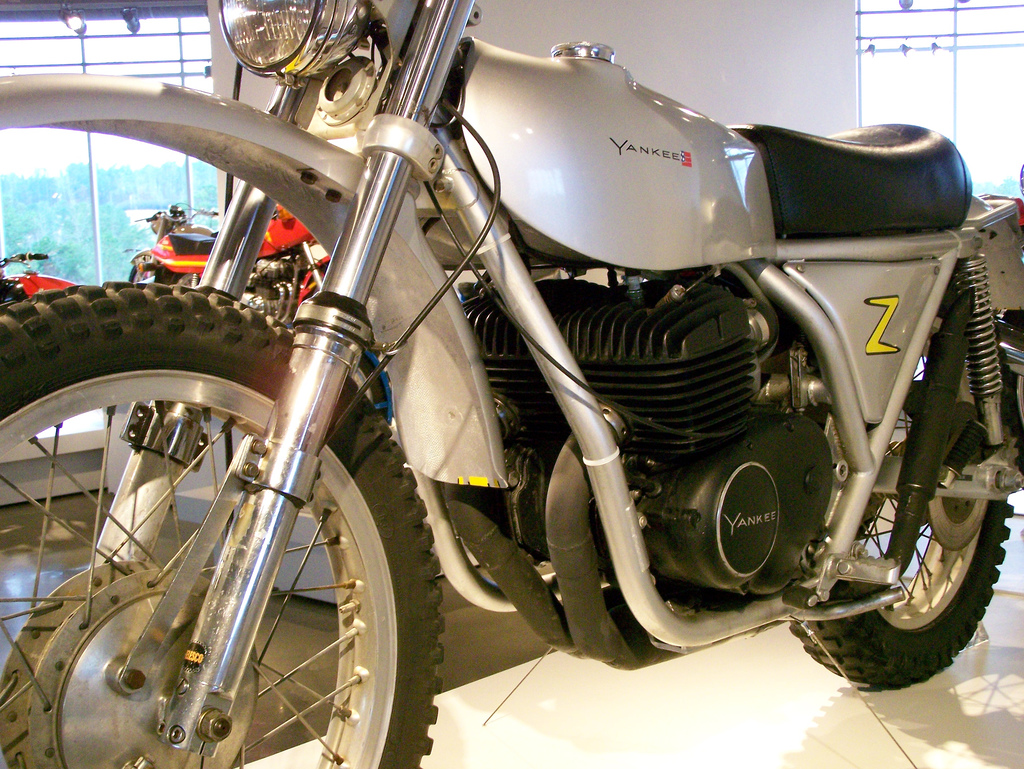
A 1972 Yankee 500Z model
