= Dudley Perkins (motorcyclist) =

American motorcycle racer

Dudley B. Perkins (May 19, 1893 – February 26, 1978 ) was an American champion motorcycle hillclimb competitor and Harley-Davidson motorcycle dealer. The American Motorcyclist Association's highest award, the AMA Dud Perkins Lifetime Achievement Award, was named after him in 1970, and he was its first recipient.

== Early years ==
Perkins was born in Kern, California, now a part of Bakersfield, California. He began riding motorcycles in 1907 when attending school in Los Angeles. A neighbor offered to let him ride his Reading-Standard motorcycle, and Perkins was "quite thrilled."

== Beginning of motorcycle career ==
After his family moved to Stockton, California, Perkins began working part-time for an Indian motorcycle dealer while still a student. He first competed on May 10, 1911, winning a one-mile race. After his stepmother died, Perkins went to live with his grandmother in Rocklin, California, where he rode an Excelsior motorcycle. Later, he moved to live with his father in San Francisco, and began hanging around at the local Indian dealership, later working there. He continued racing his Excelsior with success.

== Harley-Davidson dealer ==
In 1913, Perkins entered into a partnership with Al Maggini, then a San Francisco dealer for DeLuxe motorcycles. In January, 1914, Perkins acquired sole control of the business, which was renamed the Dudley Perkins Company, and began selling Harley-Davidsons. He said that he sold 125 motorcycles in his first year in business.

During World War I, all of Harley-Davidson's production was furnished to the U.S. military, so the Dudley Perkins Company survived by buying, refurbishing and reselling used motorcycles. At the beginning of the Depression, Perkins reported that the company was able to sell only 15 motorcycles in 1930, but business improved as the years went along. When the California Highway Patrol formed its motorcycle unit in the 1930s, the Dudley Perkins Company sold them the equipment, and Perkins helped train its officers. At the end of World War II, the company thrived by buying military surplus Harley-Davidsons, repainting them, and selling them to the civilian market. His company purchased those bikes for $125.00 each and sold them for $325.00 each.

Perkins continued to support motorcycle racers including Mert Lawwill and Mark Brelsford who both went on to win the AMA Grand National Championship. He managed his dealership until 1968, when he turned control of the business over to his son, Dudley Perkins Jr., who had been involved with the business since the end of his military service in World War II.

== Motorcycle hillclimbing ==
Perkins began competing in motorcycle hillclimb events in 1915, and always rode Harley-Davidsons. He won the Gilroy Hillclimb in 1917. He won the Capistrano Hillclimb in 1920 and 1921, which was a very popular event of that era, attracting as many as 20,000 fans. Perkins won 12 California Hillclimb championships starting in 1915. He competed until 1943, when he was 50. Perkins was considered one of the top hillclimbers of the era and was described as one of the "classiest performers."

== American Motorcycle Association leader ==
By the early 1930s, Perkins was already considered "one of the veterans of the sport of motorcycle racing". He was invited to serve on the Competition Committee of the American Motorcycle Association, now known as the American Motorcyclist Association. He was the longest-serving member of that committee. He represented the AMA in negotiations with various city officials regarding motorcycle rallies in the late 1930s, emphasizing the economic benefits to communities that agreed to sponsor such events.

In 1948, Perkins spoke out on behalf of the American Motorcycle Association against outlaw motorcyclists who had created disturbances such as the Hollister riot and a similar event in Riverside, California.

== Legacy ==
At the time of his death, Perkins "was considered the grandest of the grand old men of motorcycling." He was inducted into the AMA Motorcycle Hall of Fame in 1998.

The Harley-Davidson dealership he founded, the Dudley Perkins Company, is still in business under the name San Francisco Harley-Davidson, with its main facilities located in South San Francisco, California, and a branch on Fisherman's Wharf in San Francisco. The company celebrated its 100th anniversary in 2014.
