= Ossa (motorcycle) =

Spanish motorcycle manufacturer

Orpheo Sincronic Sociedad Anónima (OSSA)
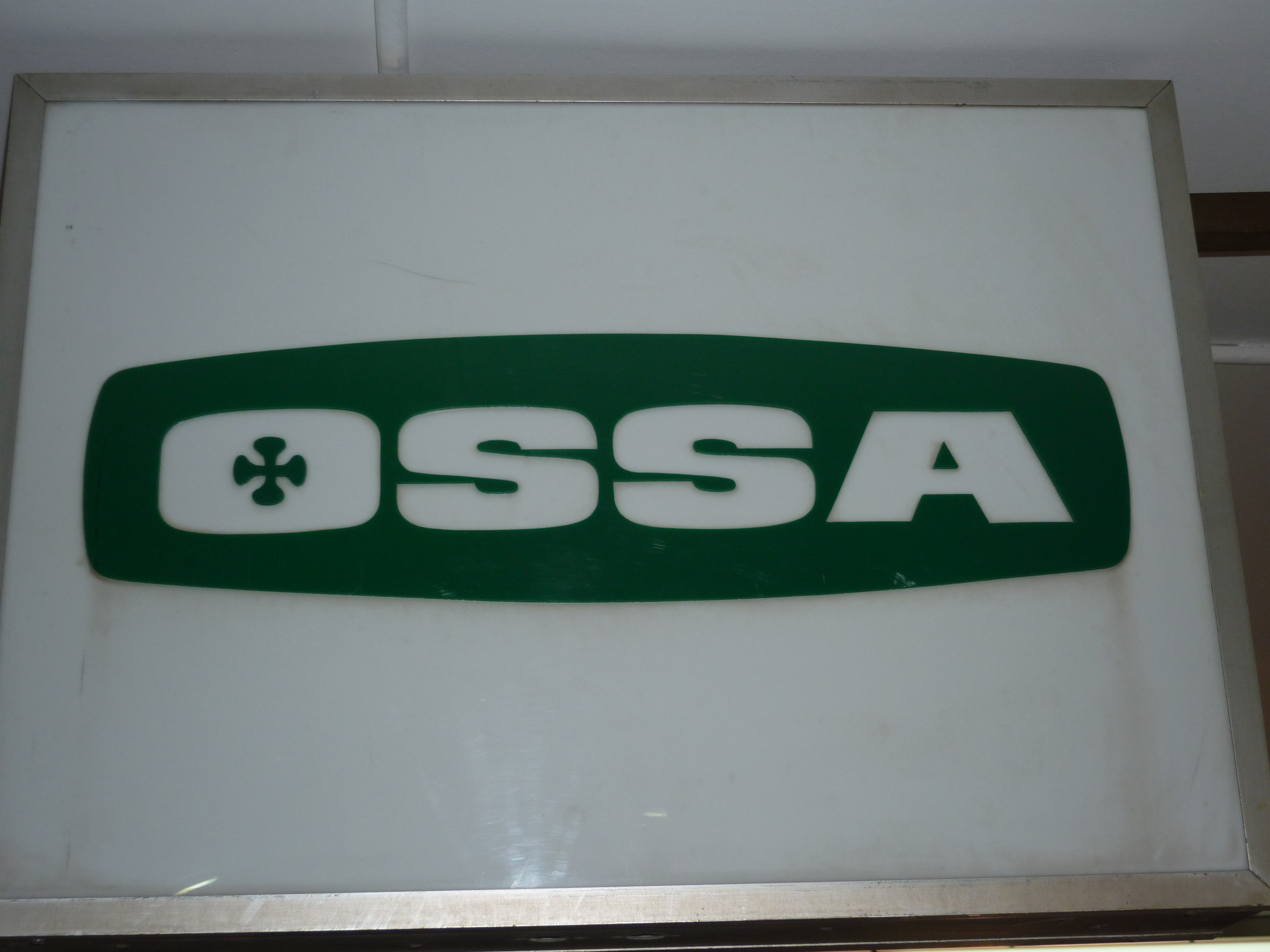
- Type: Private
- Industry: Manufacturing; Distribution
- Founded: Barcelona, Spain (1924)
- Defunct: 2015
- Headquarters: Barcelona, Spain
- Area served: Worldwide
- Key people: Manuel Giró, Eduardo Giró

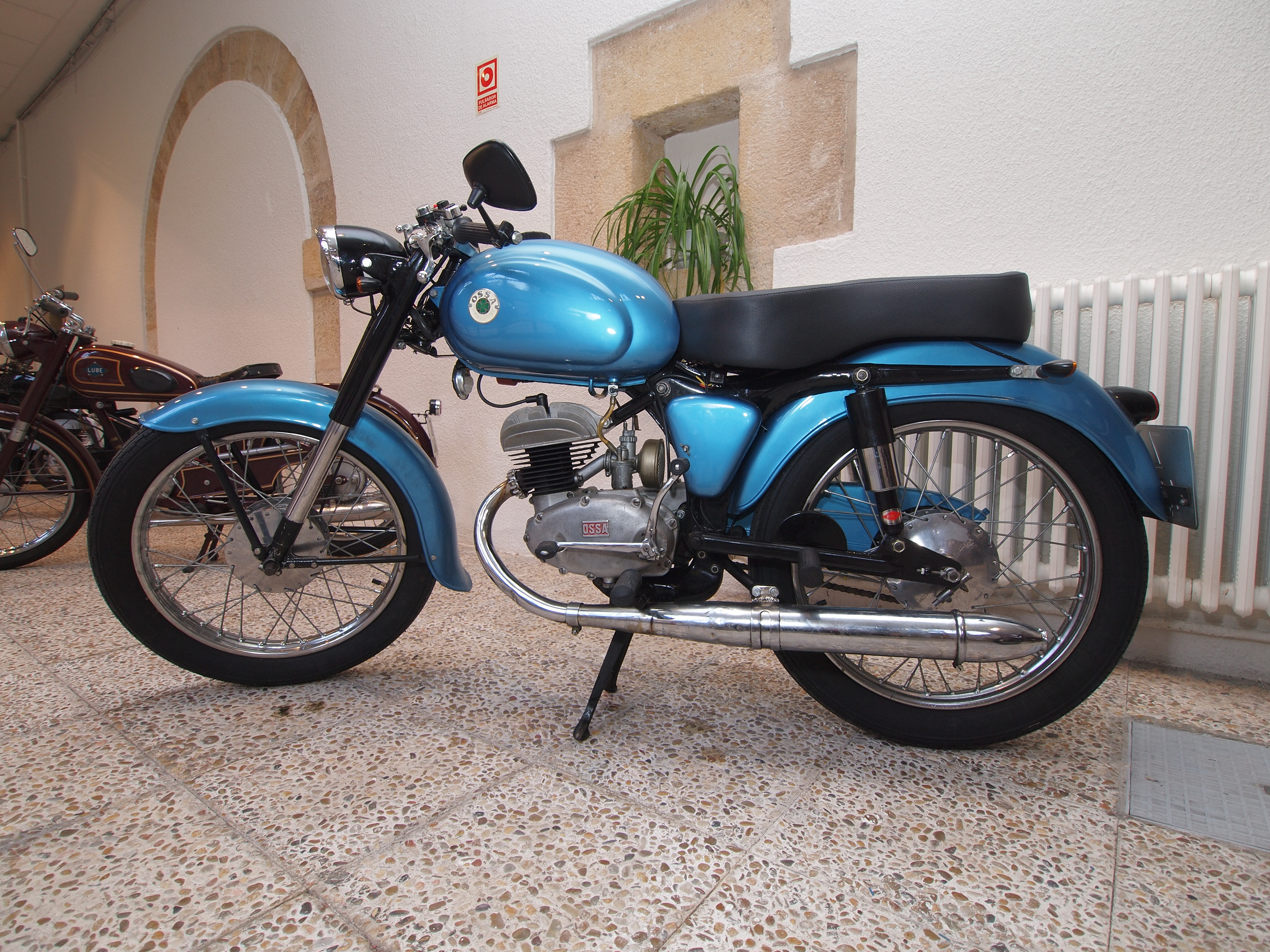
OSSA 150 (1958)

Ossa was a Spanish motorcycle manufacturer which was active from 1924 to 1982 and from 2010 to 2015. Founded by Manuel Giró, an industrialist from Barcelona, Ossa was best known for lightweight, two-stroke-engined bikes used in observed trials, motocross and enduro. The company was known originally as Orpheo Sincronic Sociedad Anónima (O.S.S.A.) and was later renamed Maquinaria Cinematográfica, S.A..

The Ossa brand was reborn in 2010 when the trademark was purchased by an investment group and produced motorcycles until 2014 when the company merged with the Spanish motorcycle manufacturer Gas Gas. When Gas Gas was absorbed by the Torrot Group in 2015, Ossa was not part of the deal and closed down again.

== History ==
=== Company origins ===
The original Ossa company got its start in 1924 making movie projectors for its home market in Spain. The company's four-leaf clover emblem wasn't actually a four-leaf clover; it is the escapement mechanism of a film projector. Before World War II, Giró was the Spanish sidecar racing national champion, along with his co-pilot, the future founder of Bultaco motorcycles, Francisco Bultó. After World War II, Ossa obtained superior two-stroke engine technology from the German DKW factory as war reparations and began mass-producing two-stroke motorcycles in 1949. Ossa reached its highest production levels in the motorcycle boom of the 1960s, exporting large numbers of exports to other European countries, but also significantly, to North American markets. In the United States and Canada, off-road motorcycling - and particularly the newly imported sport of motocross to which the light-weight and powerful Ossa was well suited - enjoyed a surging popularity. In addition to their suitability for racing, in terms of power-to-weight, Ossa motorcycles gained a reputation for reliability on and off the race track.

=== Motorsport competition ===
The Ossa firm was a strong supporter of all forms of motorcycle sport including: road racing, motocross, enduro and observed trials. Their first success came at the 1967 24 Hours of Montjuich on the streets of Barcelona. Against all the major Spanish factories, Ossa motorcycles finished a surprising first and second. Ossa repeated their success with another victory at the 1969 24 Hours of Montjuich. Inspired by this success, the factory decided to compete abroad in order to make inroads into the international market.

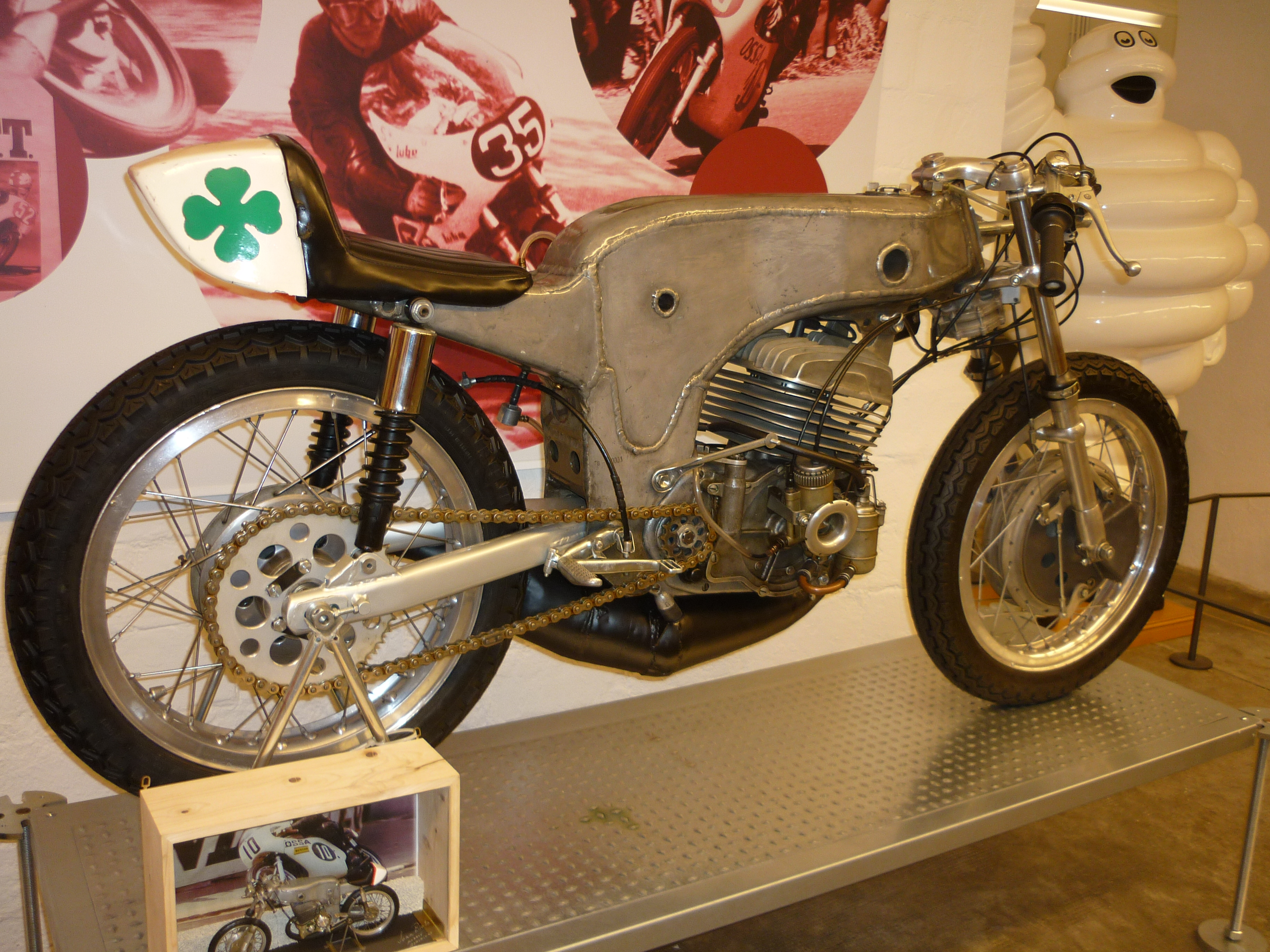
1968 Ossa 250 cc Grand Prix racer

=== Monocoque Grand Prix racer ===
Ossa achieved early success in the 250cc class of Grand Prix motorcycle racing, competing with an innovative chassis designed by Giró's son, Eduardo that was unique for the era. Eduardo Giró designed a motorcycle that compensated for its power deficit by following a philosophy of light weight, a small frontal area, and engine reliability combined with outstanding handling.

The motorcycle featured a welded monocoque frame construction of magnesium and aluminium sheets that incorporated the fuel tank and weighed a full 20 kg (44 lb) less than the Japanese competition. The monocoque's superior chassis stiffness and weight imbued it with exceptional cornering and braking abilities which, in turn allowed for faster cornering speeds than the competition. Although Ossa's 249 cc single cylinder two-stroke engine produced 20 horsepower less than that of the class-leading, V4-powered Yamaha RD05, Spanish rider Santiago Herrero was able to take advantage of the Ossa's light weight and superior handling characteristics to remain competitive, especially on tighter race tracks.

=== Grand Prix success ends in tragedy ===
After having won the 250cc Spanish national championship in 1967 and 1968, Ossa and Herrero moved up to the world championships, where they finished seventh in the 1968 250cc world championship, including a third-place finish behind the factory-backed Yamahas of Phil Read and Bill Ivy at the season-ending Nations Grand Prix held at the high speed Monza circuit.

In 1969, the Fédération Internationale de Motocyclisme changed its regulations in an effort to reduce spiraling costs in motorcycle racing. 125cc and 250cc machines would be limited to two cylinders and 6-speed transmissions. This regulation change caused the dominant Yamaha and Suzuki factories to withdraw their teams from Grand Prix racing.

The 1969 Grand Prix season would be even more successful for the Ossa factory, as Herrero won three races and held a one-point lead in the 250cc world championship going into the last race of the season in Yugoslavia. Herrero started the race in the lead but crashed on the seventh lap ending his championship hopes. He would finish third in the world championship. Ossa and Herrero repeated as Spanish 250cc national champion for a third consecutive year.

After a promising start to the 1970 season in which Herrero won his fourth 250cc Grand Prix, he died after crashing on melted tar during the 1970 Isle of Man TT. Herrero's death affected the Ossa team so much that they withdrew from road racing competitions altogether.

=== Off-road racing successes ===
Ossa also achieved some success in the AMA Grand National Championship, with rider Dick Mann helping them develop a 250cc dirt track bike on which he won the 1969 Santa Fe Grand National short track event, held on a quarter-mile dirt track oval.

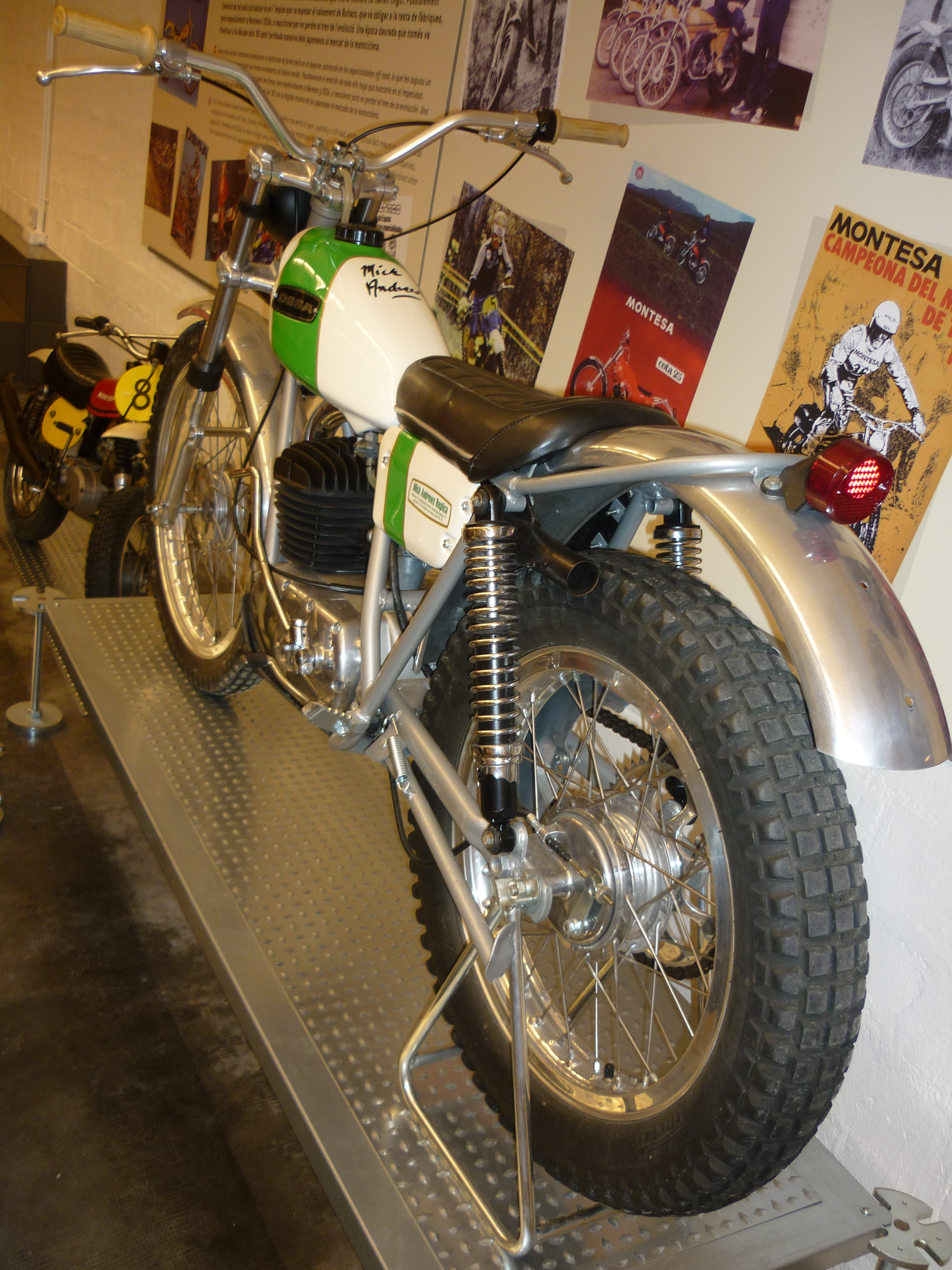
1972 Ossa Mick Andrews Replica

After withdrawing from Grand Prix motorcycle racing, Ossa redirected their competitive efforts into the sport of Observed Trials in Europe and the United States alongside such other famous Spanish makes as Bultaco and Montesa. Ossa hired British rider Mick Andrews to help design and ride their trials bike, and they went on to capture the 1971 and 1972 European Trials Championship, the forerunner to the FIM World Championship. Andrews won the grueling Scottish Six Days Trial three consecutive years between 1970 and 1972 for the Ossa factory.

=== Final years ===
Despite success in racing competitions, the firm suffered from a disorganized and sparse dealer network in the important American market. The motorcycle boom that created a new market and allowed the large European makers to reap great financial rewards also contained the seeds of their demise, and that of numerous smaller firms such as Ossa. With so many choices for both buyers and dealers, sales and service networks were not sustainable, and attempts to improve manufacturing by investing in new factories back home put Ossa, like virtually every other European firm, deep into the red.

In the declining years of the Franco Era, in 1975, the Spanish government steadily converted Spain's economic structure into one more closely resembling a free-market economy. The arrival of cheaper Japanese motorcycles into the local economy as well as a crippling employee strike in 1977 spurred the downfall of the Ossa company. By 1984 Ossa was under the control of a labor cooperative, and the following year its name was changed to Ossamoto. As a vintage make, the Ossa still enjoys a significant following among home hobbyists and amateur racers.

=== Rebirth ===
In 2010, a group of Spanish businessmen purchased the rights to the Ossa trademark and began producing Ossa branded motorcycles once again. The new firm produced trials and enduro models. The factory team competed in the 2011 FIM Trials world championship, with factory sponsored rider Jeroni Fajardo finishing the season in fifth place. In 2014 Ossa merged with the motorcycle manufacturer Gas Gas, but when Gas Gas was absorbed by the Spanish bicycle and scooter manufacturer Torrot in 2015, Ossa was not part of the deal and closed down again. Gas Gas was bought by KTM in late 2019.

In 2017, already separated from Torrot and Gas Gas and after two years with production stopped, the owners of Ossa announced the launch of an electric bicycle, the Spinta e.CP20. In the press release, they stated that they did not rule out producing motorcycles again.

== Ossa-based bikes ==
- Ossa SPQ, OSSA Seurat Piron Queyrel. Produced in France in the 1970s, the SPQ was an air-cooled 250 cc road racing motorcycle with a light frame and an OSSA engine. The SPQ excelled in French hillclimbing and criterium races in the decade, but was no match for the Yamaha TD2 in circuit competition.
- Yankee 500, a large off-road motorcycle produced in Schenectady, New York by the Yankee Motor Company. The Yankee, also known as "Ossa Yankee", had a 500 cc air-cooled Ossa twin-cylinder two-stroke engine, designed by Eduard Giró.
- Ossa BYRA 1000, a 977 cc four-cylinder two-stroke air-cooled road racing motorcycle built in Barcelona by engineer Fernando Batlló. The motor was based on two Yankee engines. This bike took part in the 24 hours of Montjuich races in 1972 and 1973. Only one was built as a road racing prototype and another as a street bike. This bike survives at the Bassella Motorcycle Museum, Alt Urgell.

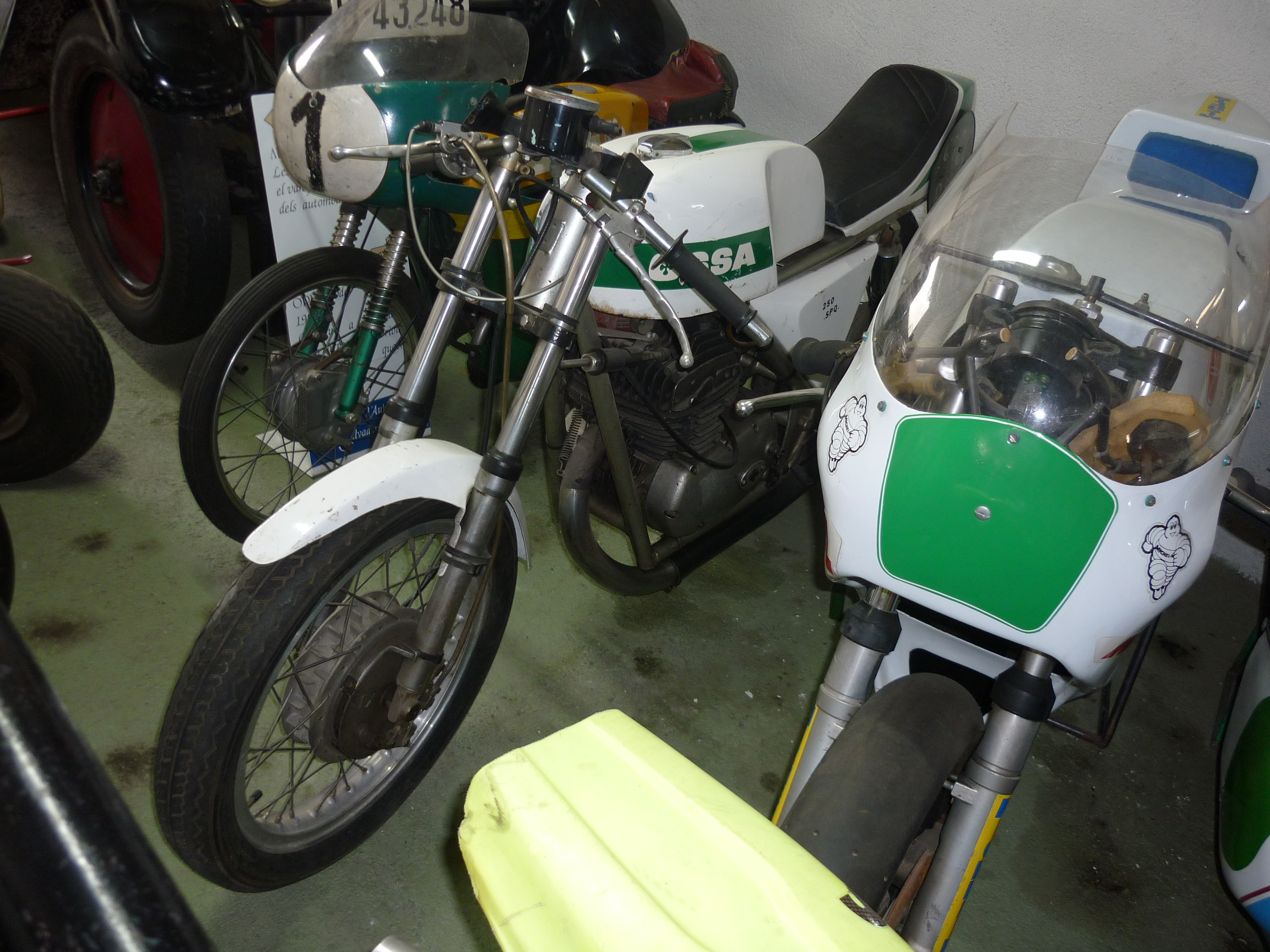
Ossa SPQ

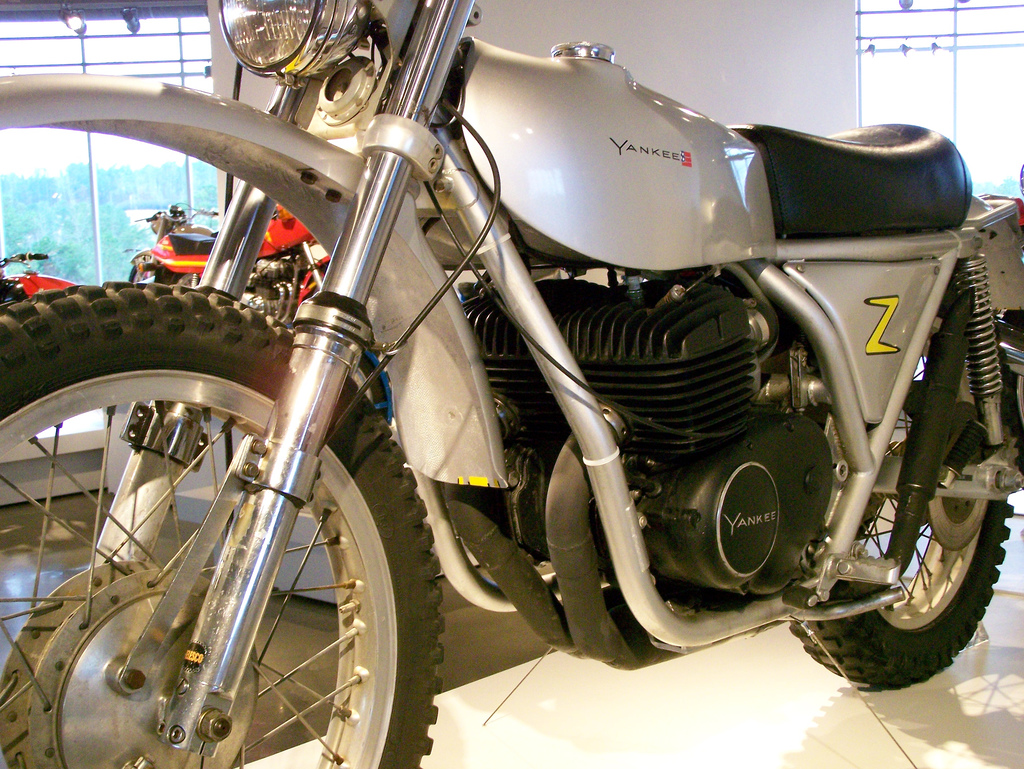
A 1972 Yankee 500 Z with a 500 cc Ossa engine

== Models ==
=== Street ===
- Ossita 50
- 125 C2
- 150 Comercial
- 160 T
- 175 Sport
- 230 Wildfire

- Sport 250
- 250 T
- 250 TE
- Copa 250 79
- 250 F3
- Yankee 500 (Street), with a 500 Yankee motor

=== Off-road ===
- Dick Mann Replica/DMR (Flat track)
- ST1 (Flat track)
- Desert (Motocross/Trail)
- Explorer (Trials)
- Gripper (Trials)
- Mick Andrews Replica (Trials)
- 250 Enduro (Enduro)
- Mountaineer (Enduro)

- Phantom (Motocross)
- Pioneer (Enduro)
- Plonker (Trials)
- Super Pioneer (Enduro)
- Six Day Replica (Enduro)
- Stiletto MX (Motocross)
- 500 Yankee Z

== See also ==
Yankee (motorcycle)
