= Ride to Work =

American nonprofit organization

- Ride to Work logo
- Formation: 2000
- Headquarters: Proctor, Minnesota
- Website: www.ridetowork.org

Ride to Work is a Minnesota-based 501(c)(4) charitable organization devoted to increasing awareness of motorcycling as a transportation alternative, mainly through the annual Ride to Work Day. The organization was incorporated in 2000 by Andy Goldfine, the owner of Aerostich.

Ride to Work Day started in 1992 as an informal event, before the Ride to Work organization existed. Since 2008, Ride to Work Day has been held on the third Monday in June. According to a 2006 statement to the National Transportation Safety Board by Goldfine, Ride to Work Day is the largest motorcycle event by number of participants, with over one million American commuter participants annually in the early 2010s according to the Congressional Motorcycle Safety Caucus and press sources.

Ride to Work Day is also run in other countries including Australia, the United Kingdom, Germany, France, Slovenia, Israel, Turkey, Ecuador, Argentina and the Philippines. In the United Kingdom, the Motorcycle Industry Association runs the event alongside National Motorcycle Week. A survey by Motor Cycle News released to coincide with National Ride to Work Day in the United Kingdom on July 21, 2010, revealed that 59% of motorists found Britain's roads stressful and that 21% of them would like to switch to two wheels.

In Argentina, in the Southern Hemisphere, the same seasonal date was respected: the third Monday of the month that initiates summer, which turns out to be the third Monday in December. This is key to have a real RTW day worldwide, due to the hemispheres seasonal differences.
