= Dick Mann =

American motorcycle racer (1934–2021)

Dick Mann (June 13, 1934 – April 26, 2021) was an American professional motorcycle racer. He was a two-time winner of the A.M.A. Grand National Championship. Mann was inducted in the Motorsports Hall of Fame of America in 1993, and the Motorcycle Hall of Fame in 1998. He was one of the few riders to ride motocross and Observed Trials as well as dirt flat tracks, TT (tourist trophy) and road racing.

Mann was the second-winningest rider in AMA Grand National Series history with 24 national victories. His career on the pro circuit spanned the early 1950s to the mid-1970s. He was known for being one of the most talented and versatile riders, and for wearing a cheap straw hat while working on his motorcycle.

== Background ==
Born Richard Scott Mann in Salt Lake City, Utah, Mann rode his first motorcycle as a teenager when he delivered papers on a Cushman scooter in Richmond, California. He learned how to ride dirt competitively on a cinder running track at the area schools. He would also ride on the cow trails in the area, experiences that would later help him in motocross. After high school, he started helping at fellow Motorcycle Hall of Fame member Hap Alzina's BSA shop in Oakland as a mechanic.

== Racing career ==
=== 1950s ===
In the summer of 1954, Mann started touring as an amateur with professional Al Gunter. Mann turned expert in 1955, and finished seventh on a Harley-Davidson in his first Grand National race, the Daytona 200. At this time, the race was held on the Daytona Beach Road Course. He slowly made a name for himself in his first three years, and he finished in the top ten in the season points for the first time in 1957. Mann had a second-place finish at the Daytona 200 and Laconia in 1958. He had his first national victory at the Peoria, Illinois Tourist Trophy (TT) in 1959. He finished second in points in that year.

=== 1960s ===
In 1963, Mann won his first AMA Grand National title. He had five podium finishes. He clinched the title by winning on September 21 Ascot Park in Gardena, California.

Mann continued to win races and place high in the points standings before his next title eight years later. He also helped pioneer motocross during that time, and raced in several motocross races in the 1960s and early 1970s. He represented the United States in the Transatlantic Trophy match race series. The series faced little-known American racers against Great Britain's well-known pavement riders.

=== 1970s ===
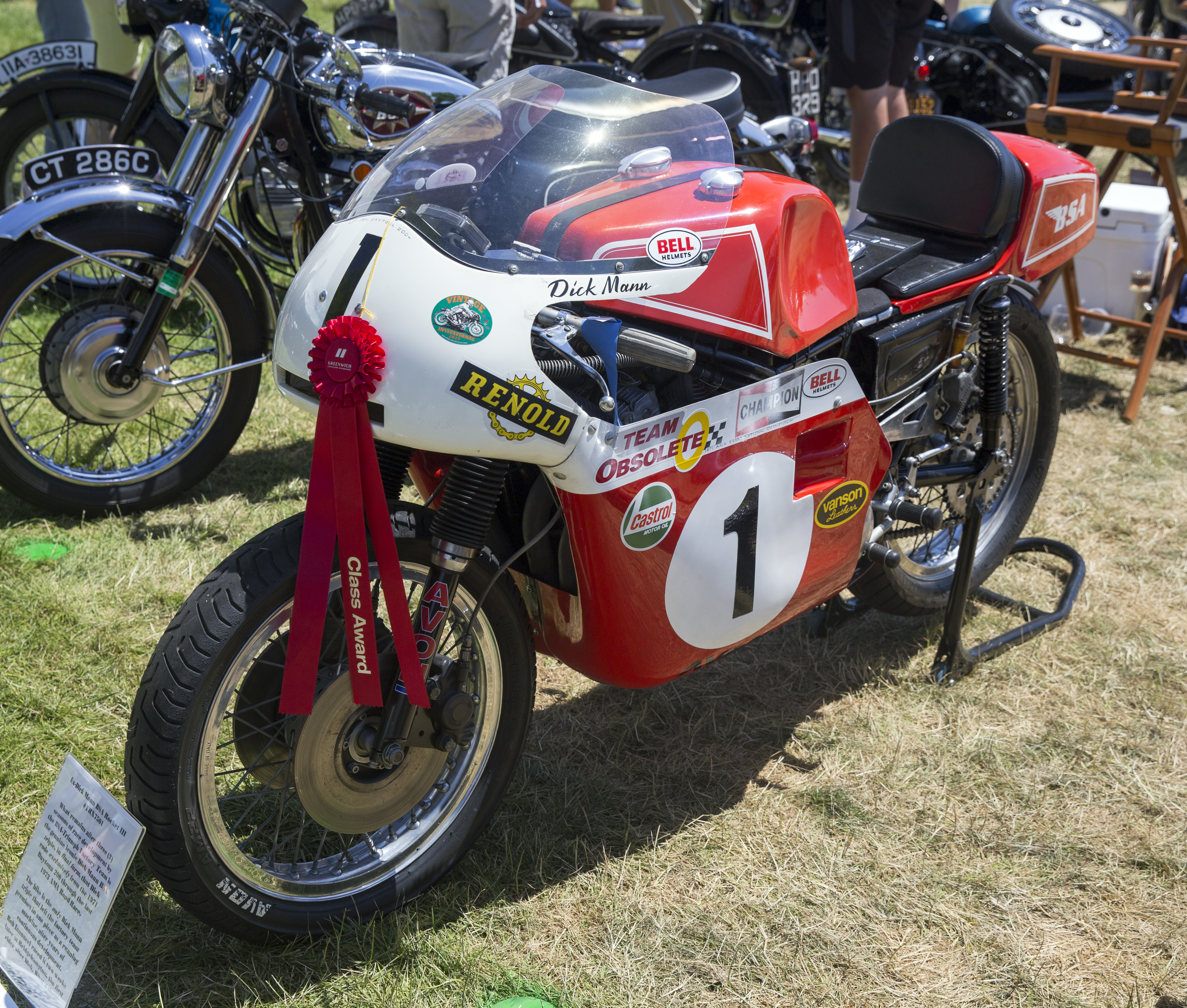
Mann won the Grand National title on this BSA A75 Rocket 3 and continued to race this very bike until the end of the 1973 season.

Mann started the decade with one of the biggest wins of his career. He won the 1970 Daytona 200, a race that he had not won in fifteen attempts. Mann beat former world champion Mike Hailwood, and rising stars Gene Romero and Gary Nixon. It was the first win by Honda in an AMA national, and it happened at the series' premiere event.

In 1971, Mann won his second Grand National title on a BSA. He became the oldest series champion in the history of the series. He won the 1971 season opener at the Houston TT. He won his second Daytona 200 in the second race of the season. The win earned him a spot on the May 1971 cover of the AMA magazine. Mann also won road races at Pocono Raceway and Kent, Washington. He was named AMA's Most Popular Rider of the Year in 1971. Mann became the first rider to win motorcycle racing's career Grand Slam by winning in Grand National on mile, half mile, short-track, TT, and road racing circuits.

Mann won races in 1972. His final win was at Peoria, the site of his first win. He remained competitive in 1973, still on a BSA, and finished in the top-ten in points at the age of 40.

Mann retired in 1974. He had raced in 240 nationals, and he finished in the top-ten in points in every season except one between 1957 and 1973.

In 1975, Mann returned to his trail riding roots. He competed on the United States International Six Days Trial team (now the International Six Days Enduro) on the Isle of Man, earning a Bronze Medal on an OSSA 350.

== Honors and awards ==
Mann was awarded the AMA Dud Perkins Award for his contributions to the sport in 1995. He was inducted in the Motorsports Hall of Fame of America in 1993. He was still competing in vintage racing when he was inducted in the Motorcycle Hall of Fame in 1998.

The Motorcycle Hall of Fame opened an exhibit honoring Mann's career on July 27, 2006. The exhibit is called "SuperMann". Over 400 people came to see the opening.

== Design and Fabrication ==
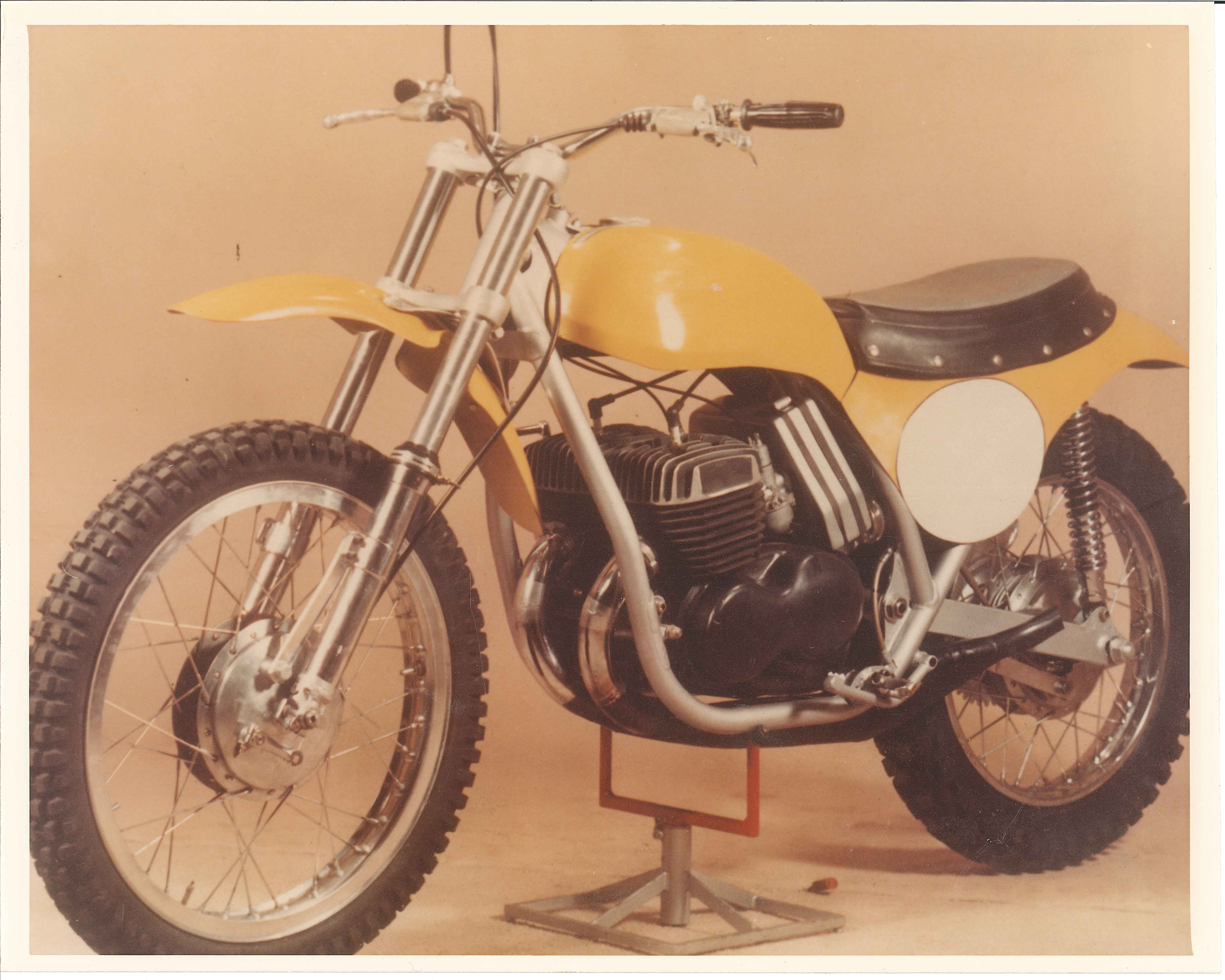
1968 Yankee Prototype

Throughout his racing career, Mann was an innovative designer and fabricator of frames and related hardware. He also worked for and acted as consultant to several motorcycle manufacturers.

=== 1960s ===
In 1966, Mann designed and fabricated a large diameter backbone Chromoly frame for his BSA A65. Elements of its geometry became the hallmark of several of his designs.

In 1967, Mann was retained by John Taylor of Yankee Motor Corp. and incorporated the same design elements into the Yankee 500Z. In 1969 while with Yankee, he designed and worked with Frank Conner of OSSA/West to build the highly successful OSSA/DMR flat tracker. After winning several National races, the DMR was put into a short run of production by Yankee with 150 units being produced in 1970-71.

Mann was also influential on styling. Design elements of an earlier BSA of Dick's appeared on the Ossa Wildfire SS tank in 1967, the DMR tank, and the tank and seat that graced the first 500Z prototypes in 1968. That prototype had influence on later designs such as Craig Vetter's Triumph X75 Hurricane.

=== 1970s ===
In 1975, Mann started designing frames for the Yamaha XT 500. In all, he sold some 200 frames for this engine in four marques, the final frames being completed in 1982. He also designed variations for the Honda XL/XR500 and the Suzuki DR/SP370. All the production frames were constructed by Terry Knight based on each of Mann's home built and extensively tested prototypes.

== Personal life ==
Mann owned a business specializing in restoring and selling vintage race motorcycles. He also actively participated in American Historic Racing Motorcycle Association (AHRMA) Vintage Moto-Cross racing. His wife's name is Kay.

== Biography ==
- Mann of His Time, Ed Youngblood. Whitehorse Press (September 7, 2002). ISBN 978-1-884313-40-0.
