= Reverse commute =

Commute in an opposite direction from normal

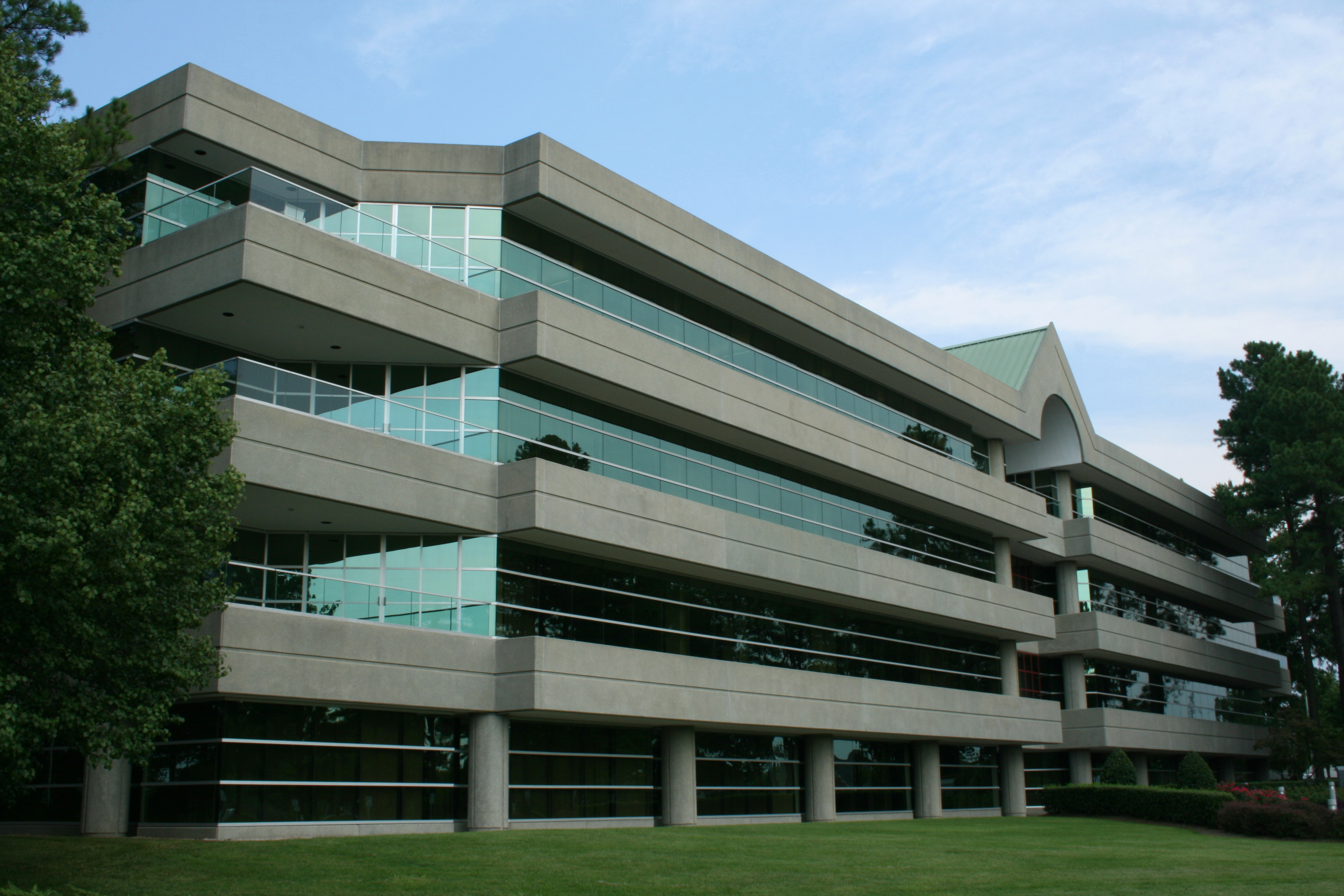
Many reverse commute to suburban office parks.

A reverse commute is a round trip, regularly taken, from an urban area to a suburban one in the morning, and returning in the evening. It is almost universally applied to trips to work in the suburbs from homes in the city. This is in opposition to the regular commute, where a person lives in the suburbs and travels to work in the city.

The reverse commuter travels in the opposite direction of the regular daily traffic flow during rush hour, and therefore encounters less road traffic congestion faced by regular commuters. An advantage of this system is the usage of otherwise empty transit capacity: no additional trains or travel lanes are necessary to accommodate people riding or driving from downtown to the outskirts in the morning, and likewise back downtown at night. Train and bus routes may be more sparse in the reverse direction, but the vehicles have to get back somehow for their next journey in most cases. However, track capacity on some railroads (for example, the Long Island Rail Road in the suburbs of New York City) significantly reduces or even eliminates reverse commute options. Hence, transit usage can be lower for reverse-commuters than regular commuters. In some cases, reverse commuting has become quite popular.

For example, Metro-North Railroad runs rush hour New Haven Line trains from New York City to Stamford, Connecticut, and the surrounding suburbs to accommodate its many reverse commuters. Low unemployment rates in the suburbs may help to fuel the increase over the past years in reverse commuter ridership.

== United States ==
The very reasons commuting makes sense (such as higher employment in the city and lower housing prices in the suburbs) operate against the reverse commuter and so people doing so are less common compared to those going the other way. However, these traditional schools of thought are changing, especially in Southern and Western US cities, where employment options tend to follow a more decentralized or polycentric model than Midwest or Eastern US cities. For instance, on the Santa Monica Freeway in Los Angeles, there are more vehicles in the morning peak hour heading westbound towards Santa Monica than into Downtown Los Angeles. This correlates to suburbs developing their own employment centers, known as edge cities.

An example of reverse commuting can be found in the Washington Metropolitan Area. Due to a combination of ample transit infrastructure, difficulty in obtaining government work, and a building height limit in downtown, employment options in the area follow a polycentric model, heavily focused in both Downtown and areas such as Arlington, Tysons, Bethesda, and Silver Spring. Companies desiring space in Washington often opt for space in Maryland or Virginia because of the great expense of office space downtown. As such, there are many people who live in Washington and work in Maryland and Virginia, either driving, taking Metrobus, Metrorail, or carpooling.

Another significant amount of reverse commuting occurs in the San Francisco Bay Area, where many workers live in San Francisco and work in job centers in Silicon Valley such as Palo Alto, Mountain View, and Cupertino. As of 2013, ridership on Caltrain during peak hours consisted of about 60% traditional commuters and 40% reverse commuters. These job centers flourished after it became cheaper to build workplaces outside the city center. On the economic flipside, disinvested areas of large cities, such as the South Bronx and South Side Chicago, also have high rates of commuting to suburbs for work.
