= Commuter worker =

Workers who commute from Mexico to the US

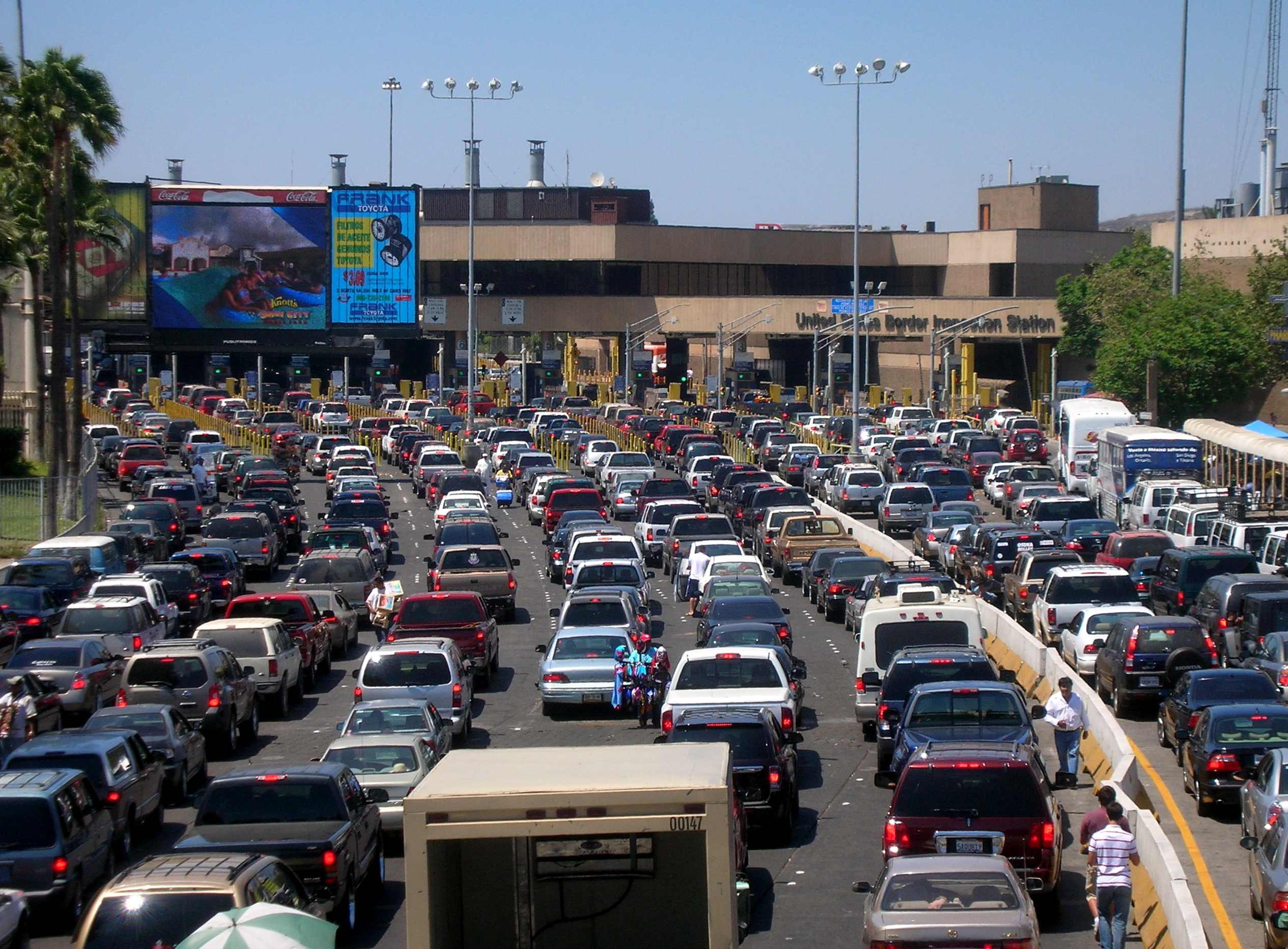
The San Ysidro border crossing between San Diego and Tijuana

A commuter worker, also known as a cross-border commuter or alien commuter, is a worker who is resident in a different country to that in which they work, and crosses a national border as part of their regular commute.

== Examples ==
=== North America ===
==== Canada, Mexico and the United States ====
Thousands of workers who live in Mexico cross the Mexico–United States border daily to work in the United States. There are also workers who cross the Canada–United States border or other national borders. The practice of crossing the Mexico – United States border for work developed in the late 1920s, following the passing of the 1924 Immigration Act, which substantially reduced legal immigration into the United States from Mexico.

In 1970, it was estimated that approximately 70,000 people commute from Mexico to the United States every day for work, where these workers made up a significant proportion of the labor force in nine main border cities. A 1992 study by San Diego Dialogue, a research institute at the University of California, San Diego, estimated that there are 40,000 commuter workers in the San Diego area. Studies have found that cross-border workers are typically older, less well paid and less well-educated than immigrant workers.

Commuting also occurs across the Canada–United States border. In 2020 it was estimated that 1,500 to 2,000 workers in health care in the Detroit area lived across the border in Windsor, Ontario. "Canadians are increasingly important to our operations," said the human resources head of Southeast Michigan's largest health care system, Beaumont Health.

=== Asia ===
==== Malaysia and Singapore ====
More than 300,000 Malaysians commute to Singapore daily via the Malaysia–Singapore border, including for education and work. Many would move to Singapore permanently and take up Singaporean citizenship, therefore becoming "Singaporeanised". Other reasons include the country's proximity to Malaysia, its higher standard of living, significantly more job opportunities arising from the country's international status as an economic hub, and most notably the higher currency exchange rate of the Singapore dollar over the Malaysian ringgit – S$1 equals to about RM3.10 as of 2022.

Analysts has stated that this has caused significant rates of human capital flight or brain drain from Malaysia. Major pull factors have included better career opportunities in Singapore and abroad as well as compensation, while major push factors included corruption, social inequality, educational opportunities, racial inequality such as the Malaysian government's bumiputera affirmative action policies. A United Nations Department of Economic and Social Affairs showed that close to a million Malaysians were in Singapore as of 2019.

Human capital flight from Malaysia has also increased in pace – 305,000 Malaysians migrated overseas between March 2008 and August 2009, compared to 140,000 in 2007. Non-bumiputeras, particularly Malaysian Indians and Malaysian Chinese, were over-represented in these statistics. Singapore is the foremost destination. This is reported to have caused Malaysia's economic growth rate to fall to an average of 4.6% per annum in the 2000s compared to 7.2% in the 1990s.

== Legal status ==
=== United States ===
The majority of United States cross-border commuters have permanent resident status in the United States (a "green card") but are permitted to reside in Mexico or Canada without losing their permanent residency if they continue to regularly commute to the United States.

Skilled Canadian workers in executive or managerial roles are eligible under the North American Free Trade Agreement for a temporary L-1 immigration status, that permits them to commute to jobs in the United States. Until 2019, individual workers could apply to Customs and Border Protection at a point of entry. Since early 2019 Department of Homeland Security, regulations require employers to file L-1 applications and extensions with the United States Citizenship and Immigration Service.

=== Europe ===
In Europe, cross-border commuting within the European Union, by citizens of an EU country, requires no additional legal status due to the free movement of labour within the EU.

== Sources ==
- Martínez, Oscar Jáquez (1996). U.S.-Mexico Borderlands: Historical and Contemporary Perspectives. Rowman & Littlefield. ISBN 9780842024471.
