= European motorcycle Grand Prix =

European Grand Prix

Grand Prix motorcycle racing
- Venue: Circuit Ricardo Tormo (2020); Circuit de Catalunya (1992–1995); Circuito del Jarama (1991)
- First race: 1991
- Last race: 2020
- Most wins (rider): Max Biaggi, Luca Cadalora, Wayne Rainey (3)
- Most wins (manufacturer): Honda (9)

The European motorcycle Grand Prix was a motorcycling event that was introduced as part of the Grand Prix motorcycle racing World Championship from 1991 to 1995. From 1996 onward the event was replaced by the Catalan Grand Prix. In 2020, the event was briefly revived, with the race taking place on the Circuit Ricardo Tormo. The decision was largely influenced by the COVID-19 pandemic, which led to the change of the calendar.

Between 1924 and 1948, the European Grand Prix was not a race in its own right but just an honorific title; one of the national Grands Prix was also designated as the European Grand Prix. The first race to be so named was the 1924 Nations Grand Prix, held at the Monza circuit in Italy. Until 1937, the winners of the race designated the European Grand Prix were awarded the title of European champion. In 1938, the European championship became decided over a series of races and the European Grand Prix designation was not used again until 1947, although no longer awarding the European championship title.

== Official names and sponsors ==
- 1991: G.P. de Europa (no official sponsor)
- 1992: Gran Premio Super Nintendo Entertainment System de Europa
- 1993–1994: Gran Premi Pepsi d'Europa
- 1995: Gran Premio Marlboro de Catalunya
- 2020: Gran Premio de Europa (no official sponsor)

== Track gallery ==
The Jarama track, used in 1991.

The Catalunya track, used from 1992 to 1995.

== Winners ==
=== As a standalone event ===
==== Multiple winners (riders) ====
# Wins	Rider	Wins	
# Wins	Rider	Category	Years won
3	(United States) Wayne Rainey	500cc	1991, 1992, 1993
3	(Italy) Luca Cadalora	500cc	1994
3	(Italy) Luca Cadalora	250cc	1991, 1992
3	(Italy) Max Biaggi	250cc	1993, 1994, 1995

==== Multiple winners (manufacturers) ====
# Wins	Manufacturer	Wins	
# Wins	Manufacturer	Category	Years won
9	(Japan) Honda	500cc	1995
9	(Japan) Honda	250cc	1991, 1992, 1993
9	(Japan) Honda	125cc	1991, 1992, 1993, 1994, 1995
4	(Japan) Yamaha	500cc	1991, 1992, 1993, 1994
2	(Italy) Aprilia	250cc	1994, 1995

==== By year ====
Year	Track	Moto3		Moto2		MotoGP		Report
Year	Track	Rider	Manufacturer	Rider	Manufacturer	Rider	Manufacturer	Report
2020	Valencia	(Spain) Raúl Fernández	KTM	(Italy) Marco Bezzecchi	Kalex	(Spain) Joan Mir	Suzuki	Report
Year	Track	125cc		250cc		500cc		Report
Year	Track	Rider	Manufacturer	Rider	Manufacturer	Rider	Manufacturer	Report
1995	Catalunya	(Japan) Haruchika Aoki	Honda	(Italy) Max Biaggi	Aprilia	(Spain) Àlex Crivillé	Honda	Report
1994	Catalunya	(Germany) Dirk Raudies	Honda	(Italy) Max Biaggi	Aprilia	(Italy) Luca Cadalora	Yamaha	Report
1993	Catalunya	(Japan) Noboru Ueda	Honda	(Italy) Max Biaggi	Honda	(United States) Wayne Rainey	Yamaha	Report
1992	Catalunya	(Italy) Ezio Gianola	Honda	(Italy) Luca Cadalora	Honda	(United States) Wayne Rainey	Yamaha	Report
1991	Jarama	(Italy) Loris Capirossi	Honda	(Italy) Luca Cadalora	Honda	(United States) Wayne Rainey	Yamaha	Report

=== As an honorary designation ===
==== By year ====
Year	Designated Grand Prix	Track	125cc	175cc	250cc	350cc	500cc	750cc	1000cc	Report
1948	(Northern Ireland) Ulster Grand Prix	Clady			(United Kingdom) Maurice Cann	(United Kingdom) Freddie Frith	(Italy) Enrico Lorenzetti			Report
1947	(Switzerland) Swiss Grand Prix	Bremgarten			(Italy) Bruno Francisci	(United Kingdom) Fergus Anderson	(Italy) Omobono Tenni			Report
1946 - 1938	Not held									
1937	(Switzerland) Swiss Grand Prix	Bremgarten			(Italy) Omobono Tenni	(United Kingdom) Jimmie Guthrie	(United Kingdom) Jimmie Guthrie			Report
1936	(Germany) German Grand Prix	Sachsenring			(Republic of Ireland) Henry Tyrell-Smith	(United Kingdom) Freddie Frith	(United Kingdom) Jimmie Guthrie			Report
1935	(Northern Ireland) Ulster Grand Prix	Clady			(Germany) Arthur Geiß	(United Kingdom) Wal Handley	(United Kingdom) Jimmie Guthrie			Report
1934	(Netherlands) Dutch TT	Assen		(Belgium) Yvan Goor	(Germany) Walfried Winkler	(United Kingdom) Jimmie Simpson	(Belgium) Pol Demeuter			Report
1933	(Sweden) Swedish Grand Prix	Saxtorp			(United Kingdom) Charlie Dodson	(United Kingdom) Jimmie Simpson	(Sweden) Gunnar Kalén			Report
1932	(Italy) Nations Grand Prix	Littorio		(Italy) Carlo Baschieri	(Italy) Riccardo Brusi	(France) Louis Jeannin	(Italy) Piero Taruffi			Report
1931	(France) French Grand Prix	Montlhéry		(United Kingdom) Eric Fernihough	(United Kingdom) Graham Walker	(United Kingdom) Ernie Nott	(United Kingdom) Tim Hunt			Report
1930	(Belgium) Belgian Grand Prix	Spa-Francorchamps		(Belgium) Yvan Goor	(United Kingdom) Syd Crabtree	(United Kingdom) Ernie Nott	(Republic of Ireland) Henry Tyrell-Smith			Report
1929	(Spain) Spanish Grand Prix	Granollers		(Germany) Josef Klein	(United Kingdom) Frank Longman	(United Kingdom) Leo Davenport	(United Kingdom) Tim Hunt			Report
1928	(Switzerland) Swiss Grand Prix	Meyrin	(Switzerland) Paul Lehmann	(Italy) Alfredo Panella	(United Kingdom) Cecil Ashby	(United Kingdom) Wal Handley	(United Kingdom) Wal Handley			Report
1927	(Germany) German Grand Prix	Nürburgring		(Germany) Willy Henkelmann	(United Kingdom) Cecil Ashby	(United Kingdom) Jimmie Simpson	(United Kingdom) Graham Walker	(Germany) Josef Steltzer	(Germany) Josef Giggenbach	Report
1926	(Belgium) Belgian Grand Prix	Spa-Francorchamps		(Belgium) René Milhoux	(United Kingdom) Jock Porter	(United Kingdom) Frank Longman	(United Kingdom) Jimmie Simpson			Report
1925	(Italy) Nations Grand Prix	Monza		(Italy) Mario Vaga	(United Kingdom) Jock Porter	(Italy) Tazio Nuvolari	(Italy) Mario Revelli			Report
1924	(Italy) Nations Grand Prix	Monza			(Belgium) Maurice van Geert	(United Kingdom) Jimmie Simpson	(Italy) Guido Mentasti			Report
