= Belgian motorcycle Grand Prix =

Motorcycle race held in Belgium

Coordinates: 50°59′22″N 5°15′25″E

Belgian Grand Prix
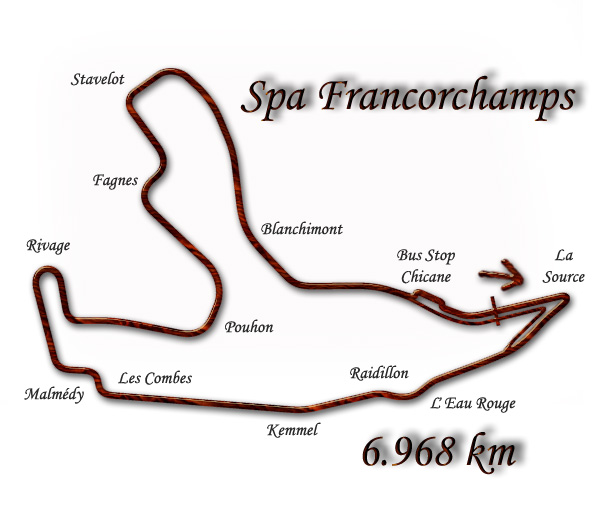

Grand Prix motorcycle racing
- Venue: Circuit de Spa-Francorchamps (1949–1979, 1981–1986, 1988–1990); Circuit Zolder (1980)
- First race: 1949
- Last race: 1990
- Most wins (rider): Giacomo Agostini (8)
- Most wins (manufacturer): MV Agusta (26)

The Belgian motorcycle Grand Prix was a motorcycling event that was part of the Grand Prix motorcycle racing season from 1949 to 1990.

== History ==
The first official Belgian Grand Prix was held in 1949, but non-championship races were held as far back as 1921.

Every Belgian GP was held at the Spa-Francorchamps circuit, with the exception of the 1980 season when the round moved to the Zolder circuit due to problems with the new asphalt at Spa-Francorchamps in 1979. After the problems were resolved, Spa-Francorchamps became the host again from 1981 onwards.

The last race was held in 1990, and was subject to controversy. At the time, the FIM–IRTA war was raging on, and the Belgian Grand Prix became a casualty of this. Bernie Ecclestone decided to double the ticket prices for the 1989 Belgian Grand Prix compared to the 1989 Dutch TT which was held a week earlier. This was much to the anger of the Belgian fans and as a result of this, many fans stayed at home for the 1990 Belgian Grand Prix. This drop in spectators, in combination with the race being held on a Saturday rather than a Sunday (which was similar to the Dutch TT at the time), caused the Belgian GP to be scrapped from the 1991 season onwards.

== Future ==
Improvements to the circuit to make it suitable for motorcycle racing were made in autumn 2021 in time for the 2022 endurance season, and the Spa 24 Hours motorcycle race debuted at Spa in June 2022. It is unknown if Spa or another Belgian circuit will apply for MotoGP.

== Official names and sponsors ==
- 1949–1975: Grand Prix de Belgique des Motos/Grote Prijs van Belgie voor Moto's (no official sponsor)
- 1976-1978: Grand Prix Belgique/Grote Prijs Belgie (no official sponsor)
- 1979: G.P. Moto (no official sponsor)
- 1980, 1982: Grand Prix of Belgium (no official sponsor)
- 1981: Grand Prix Moto (no official sponsor)
- 1983: GP Johnson of Belgium
- 1984–1985: Johnson GP of Belgium
- 1986: GP of Belgium (not mentioned in the name but the race was sponsored by Johnson)
- 1988: GP of Belgium Gauloises Blondes
- 1989: Belgium Motorcycle Grand Prix (no official sponsor)
- 1990: Belgian Motorcycle Grand Prix (no official sponsor)

== Formerly used circuits ==
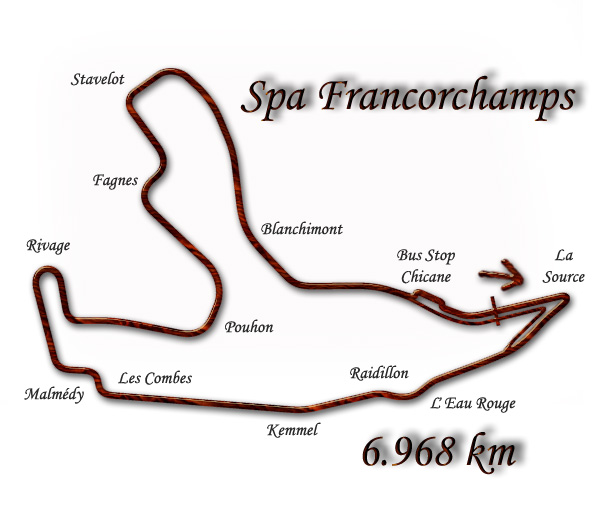
Circuit de Spa-Francorchamps, used in 1949–1979, 1981–1986, 1988–1990

Zolder, used in 1980

== Winners ==
=== Multiple winners (riders) ===
# Wins	Rider	Wins	
# Wins	Rider	Category	Years won
8	(Italy) Giacomo Agostini	500cc	1966, 1967, 1968, 1969, 1970, 1971, 1972, 1973
6	(United Kingdom) John Surtees	500cc	1956, 1958, 1959, 1960
6	(United Kingdom) John Surtees	350cc	1956, 1958
6	(Spain) Ángel Nieto	125cc	1970, 1972, 1974, 1976, 1980
6	(Spain) Ángel Nieto	50cc	1972
5	(United Kingdom) Mike Hailwood	500cc	1962, 1963, 1964, 1965
5	(United Kingdom) Mike Hailwood	350cc	1966
4	(United Kingdom) Geoff Duke	500cc	1951, 1954
4	(United Kingdom) Geoff Duke	350cc	1951, 1952
4	(Italy) Carlo Ubbiali	250cc	1956, 1960
4	(Italy) Carlo Ubbiali	125cc	1956, 1959
4	(United States) Freddie Spencer	500cc	1982, 1984, 1985
4	(United States) Freddie Spencer	250cc	1985
3	(Italy) Umberto Masetti	500cc	1950, 1952, 1953
3	(West Germany) Ernst Degner	125cc	1960
3	(West Germany) Ernst Degner	50cc	1962, 1965
3	(United Kingdom) Phil Read	500cc	1974, 1975
3	(United Kingdom) Phil Read	250cc	1968
3	(Spain) Ricardo Tormo	125cc	1982
3	(Spain) Ricardo Tormo	50cc	1978, 1981
3	(West Germany) Anton Mang	250cc	1980, 1981, 1982
2	(Switzerland) Luigi Taveri	125cc	1961, 1962
2	(Rhodesia) Jim Redman	350cc	1961, 1965
2	(West Germany) Hans-Georg Anscheidt	50cc	1967, 1968
2	(Netherlands) Jan de Vries	50cc	1971, 1973
2	(United Kingdom) Barry Sheene	500cc	1977
2	(United Kingdom) Barry Sheene	125cc	1971
2	(Italy) Walter Villa	250cc	1976, 1977
2	(Italy) Paolo Pileri	250cc	1978
2	(Italy) Paolo Pileri	125cc	1975
2	(Italy) Pier Paolo Bianchi	125cc	1977, 1978
2	(Australia) Barry Smith	125cc	1979
2	(Australia) Barry Smith	50cc	1969
2	(Italy) Eugenio Lazzarini	125cc	1983
2	(Italy) Eugenio Lazzarini	50cc	1977
2	(Switzerland) Stefan Dörflinger	80cc	1984
2	(Switzerland) Stefan Dörflinger	50cc	1980
2	(United States) Randy Mamola	500cc	1980, 1986
2	(Spain) Sito Pons	250cc	1986, 1988
2	(Netherlands) Hans Spaan	125cc	1989, 1990

=== Multiple winners (manufacturers) ===
# Wins	Manufacturer	Wins	
# Wins	Manufacturer	Category	Years won
26	(Italy) MV Agusta	500cc	1956, 1958, 1959, 1960, 1961, 1962, 1963, 1964, 1965, 1966, 1967, 1968, 1969, 1970, 1971, 1972, 1973, 1974, 1975
26	(Italy) MV Agusta	350cc	1956, 1958
26	(Italy) MV Agusta	250cc	1956, 1957, 1960
26	(Italy) MV Agusta	125cc	1956, 1959
17	(Japan) Honda	500cc	1982, 1984, 1985, 1989
17	(Japan) Honda	250cc	1961, 1962, 1965, 1966, 1985, 1986, 1988, 1989
17	(Japan) Honda	125cc	1961, 1962, 1989, 1990
17	(Japan) Honda	50cc	1964
14	(Japan) Suzuki	500cc	1976, 1977, 1978, 1979, 1980, 1981
14	(Japan) Suzuki	125cc	1963, 1971
14	(Japan) Suzuki	50cc	1962, 1963, 1965, 1967, 1968, 1971
14	(Japan) Yamaha	500cc	1983, 1986, 1988, 1990
14	(Japan) Yamaha	250cc	1963, 1964, 1967, 1968, 1970, 1972, 1973, 1974, 1975, 1990
6	(Italy) Gilera	500cc	1950, 1952, 1953, 1954, 1955, 1957
6	(West Germany) Kreidler	50cc	1973, 1974, 1975, 1976, 1977, 1980
6	(Spain) Derbi	125cc	1970, 1972, 1974, 1988
6	(Spain) Derbi	50cc	1969, 1972
5	(Japan) Kawasaki	250cc	1979, 1980, 1981, 1982
5	(Japan) Kawasaki	125cc	1969
4	(Italy) Moto Guzzi	350cc	1953, 1954, 1955, 1957
4	(Italy) Morbidelli	250cc	1978
4	(Italy) Morbidelli	125cc	1975, 1977, 1979
3	(United Kingdom) Norton	500cc	1951
3	(United Kingdom) Norton	350cc	1951, 1952
3	(Spain) Bultaco	125cc	1976
3	(Spain) Bultaco	50cc	1978, 1981
2	(United Kingdom) Velocette	350cc	1949, 1950
2	(East Germany) MZ	250cc	1971
2	(East Germany) MZ	125cc	1960
2	(United States) Harley-Davidson	250cc	1976, 1977
2	(Italy) Minarelli	125cc	1978, 1980
2	(Italy) Garelli	125cc	1983, 1985

=== By year ===
A pink background indicates an event that was not part of the Grand Prix motorcycle racing championship.

Year	Track	125cc		250cc		500cc		Report
Year	Track	Rider	Manufacturer	Rider	Manufacturer	Rider	Manufacturer	Report
1990	Spa-Francorchamps	(Netherlands) Hans Spaan	Honda	(United States) John Kocinski	Yamaha	(United States) Wayne Rainey	Yamaha	Report

Year	Track	80cc		125cc		250cc		500cc		Report
Year	Track	Rider	Manufacturer	Rider	Manufacturer	Rider	Manufacturer	Rider	Manufacturer	Report
1989	Spa-Francorchamps			(Netherlands) Hans Spaan	Honda	(Switzerland) Jacques Cornu	Honda	(United States) Eddie Lawson	Honda	Report
1988	Spa-Francorchamps			(Spain) Jorge Martínez	Derbi	(Spain) Sito Pons	Honda	(Australia) Wayne Gardner	Yamaha	Report
1986	Spa-Francorchamps			(Italy) Domenico Brigaglia	Ducados-MBA	(Spain) Sito Pons	Honda	(United States) Randy Mamola	Yamaha	Report
1985	Spa-Francorchamps			(Italy) Fausto Gresini	Garelli	(United States) Freddie Spencer	Honda	(United States) Freddie Spencer	Honda	Report
1984	Spa-Francorchamps	(Switzerland) Stefan Dörflinger	Zündapp			(West Germany) Manfred Herweh	Real-Rotax	(United States) Freddie Spencer	Honda	Report
Year	Track	50cc		125cc		250cc		500cc		Report
Year	Track	Rider	Manufacturer	Rider	Manufacturer	Rider	Manufacturer	Rider	Manufacturer	Report
1983	Spa-Francorchamps			(Italy) Eugenio Lazzarini	Garelli	(Belgium) Didier de Radiguès	Chevallier-Yamaha	(United States) Kenny Roberts	Yamaha	Report

Year	Track	50cc		125cc		250cc		350cc		500cc		Report
Year	Track	Rider	Manufacturer	Rider	Manufacturer	Rider	Manufacturer	Rider	Manufacturer	Rider	Manufacturer	Report
1982	Spa-Francorchamps			(Spain) Ricardo Tormo	Sanvenero	(West Germany) Anton Mang	Kawasaki			(United States) Freddie Spencer	Honda	Report
1981	Spa-Francorchamps	(Spain) Ricardo Tormo	Bultaco			(West Germany) Anton Mang	Kawasaki			(Italy) Marco Lucchinelli	Suzuki	Report
1980	Zolder	(Switzerland) Stefan Dörflinger	Kreidler	(Spain) Ángel Nieto	Minarelli	(West Germany) Anton Mang	Kawasaki			(United States) Randy Mamola	Suzuki	Report
1979	Spa-Francorchamps	(Netherlands) Henk van Kessel	Sparta	(Australia) Barry Smith	Morbidelli	(Austria) Edi Stöllinger	Kawasaki			(New Zealand) Dennis Ireland	Suzuki	Report
1978	Spa-Francorchamps	(Spain) Ricardo Tormo	Bultaco	(Italy) Pier Paolo Bianchi	Minarelli	(Italy) Paolo Pileri	Morbidelli			(Netherlands) Wil Hartog	Suzuki	Report
1977	Spa-Francorchamps	(Italy) Eugenio Lazzarini	Kreidler	(Italy) Pier Paolo Bianchi	Morbidelli	(Italy) Walter Villa	Harley-Davidson			(United Kingdom) Barry Sheene	Suzuki	Report
1976	Spa-Francorchamps	(West Germany) Herbert Rittberger	Kreidler	(Spain) Ángel Nieto	Bultaco	(Italy) Walter Villa	Harley-Davidson			(United Kingdom) John Williams	Suzuki	Report
1975	Spa-Francorchamps	(Belgium) Julien van Zeebroeck	Kreidler	(Italy) Paolo Pileri	Morbidelli	(Venezuela) Johnny Cecotto	Yamaha			(United Kingdom) Phil Read	MV Agusta	Report
1974	Spa-Francorchamps	(West Germany) Gerhard Thurow	Kreidler	(Spain) Ángel Nieto	Derbi	(Sweden) Kent Andersson	Yamaha			(United Kingdom) Phil Read	MV Agusta	Report
1973	Spa-Francorchamps	(Netherlands) Jan de Vries	Kreidler	(Netherlands) Jos Schurgers	Bridgestone	(Finland) Teuvo Länsivuori	Yamaha			(Italy) Giacomo Agostini	MV Agusta	Report
1972	Spa-Francorchamps	(Spain) Ángel Nieto	Derbi	(Spain) Ángel Nieto	Derbi	(Finland) Jarno Saarinen	Yamaha			(Italy) Giacomo Agostini	MV Agusta	Report
1971	Spa-Francorchamps	(Netherlands) Jan de Vries	Suzuki	(United Kingdom) Barry Sheene	Suzuki	(Italy) Silvio Grassetti	MZ			(Italy) Giacomo Agostini	MV Agusta	Report
1970	Spa-Francorchamps	(Netherlands) Aalt Toersen	Jamathi	(Spain) Ángel Nieto	Derbi	(United Kingdom) Rod Gould	Yamaha			(Italy) Giacomo Agostini	MV Agusta	Report
1969	Spa-Francorchamps	(Australia) Barry Smith	Derbi	(United Kingdom) Dave Simmonds	Kawasaki	(Spain) Santiago Herrero	Ossa			(Italy) Giacomo Agostini	MV Agusta	Report
1968	Spa-Francorchamps	(Germany) Hans-Georg Anscheidt	Suzuki			(United Kingdom) Phil Read	Yamaha			(Italy) Giacomo Agostini	MV Agusta	Report
1967	Spa-Francorchamps	(West Germany) Hans-Georg Anscheidt	Suzuki			(United Kingdom) Bill Ivy	Yamaha			(Italy) Giacomo Agostini	MV Agusta	Report
1966	Spa-Francorchamps					(United Kingdom) Mike Hailwood	Honda			(Italy) Giacomo Agostini	MV Agusta	Report
1965	Spa-Francorchamps	(West Germany) Ernst Degner	Suzuki			(Rhodesia) Jim Redman	Honda			(United Kingdom) Mike Hailwood	MV Agusta	Report
1964	Spa-Francorchamps	(United Kingdom) Ralph Bryans	Honda			(Canada) Mike Duff	Yamaha			(United Kingdom) Mike Hailwood	MV Agusta	Report
1963	Spa-Francorchamps	(Japan) Isao Morishita	Suzuki	(Austria) Bert Schneider	Suzuki	(Japan) Fumio Ito	Yamaha			(United Kingdom) Mike Hailwood	MV Agusta	Report
1962	Spa-Francorchamps	(West Germany) Ernst Degner	Suzuki	(Switzerland) Luigi Taveri	Honda	(United Kingdom) Bob McIntyre	Honda			(United Kingdom) Mike Hailwood	MV Agusta	Report
Year	Track			125cc		250cc		350cc		500cc		Report
Year	Track			Rider	Manufacturer	Rider	Manufacturer	Rider	Manufacturer	Rider	Manufacturer	Report
1961	Spa-Francorchamps			(Switzerland) Luigi Taveri	Honda	(Federation of Rhodesia and Nyasaland) Jim Redman	Honda			(Federation of Rhodesia and Nyasaland) Gary Hocking	MV Agusta	Report
1960	Spa-Francorchamps			(East Germany) Ernst Degner	MZ	(Italy) Carlo Ubbiali	MV Agusta			(United Kingdom) John Surtees	MV Agusta	Report
1959	Spa-Francorchamps			(Italy) Carlo Ubbiali	MV Agusta					(United Kingdom) John Surtees	MV Agusta	Report
1958	Spa-Francorchamps			(Italy) Alberto Gandossi	Ducati			(United Kingdom) John Surtees	MV Agusta	(United Kingdom) John Surtees	MV Agusta	Report
1957	Spa-Francorchamps			(Italy) Tarquinio Provini	FB-Mondial	(United Kingdom) John Hartle	MV Agusta	(Australia) Keith Campbell	Moto Guzzi	(Italy) Libero Liberati	Gilera	Report
1956	Spa-Francorchamps			(Italy) Carlo Ubbiali	MV Agusta	(Italy) Carlo Ubbiali	MV Agusta	(United Kingdom) John Surtees	MV Agusta	(United Kingdom) John Surtees	MV Agusta	Report
1955	Spa-Francorchamps							(United Kingdom) Bill Lomas	Moto Guzzi	(Italy) Giuseppe Colnago	Gilera	Report
1954	Spa-Francorchamps							(Australia) Ken Kavanagh	Moto Guzzi	(United Kingdom) Geoff Duke	Gilera	Report
1953	Spa-Francorchamps							(United Kingdom) Fergus Anderson	Moto Guzzi	(Italy) Umberto Masetti	Gilera	Report
1952	Spa-Francorchamps							(United Kingdom) Geoff Duke	Norton	(Italy) Umberto Masetti	Gilera	Report
1951	Spa-Francorchamps							(United Kingdom) Geoff Duke	Norton	(United Kingdom) Geoff Duke	Norton	Report
1950	Spa-Francorchamps							(United Kingdom) Bob Foster	Velocette	(Italy) Umberto Masetti	Gilera	Report
1949	Spa-Francorchamps							(United Kingdom) Freddie Frith	Velocette	(United Kingdom) Bill Doran	AJS	Report
1948	Spa-Francorchamps							(United Kingdom) Bob Foster	Velocette	(United Kingdom) Johnny Lockett	Norton	Report
1947	Spa-Francorchamps					(Italy) Bruno Francisci	Moto Guzzi	(United Kingdom) Ken Bills	Norton	(United Kingdom) Harold Daniell	Norton	Report

Year	Track	175cc		250cc		350cc		500cc		Report
Year	Track	Rider	Manufacturer	Rider	Manufacturer	Rider	Manufacturer	Rider	Manufacturer	Report
1939	Spa-Francorchamps			(Germany) Ewald Kluge	DKW	(United Kingdom) Ted Mellors	Velocette	(Germany) Georg Meier	BMW	Report
1938	Spa-Francorchamps	(Belgium) Léon Neumann	DKW	(Germany) Ewald Kluge	DKW	(United Kingdom) John White	Norton	(Germany) Georg Meier	BMW	Report
1937	Spa-Francorchamps	(Germany) Bernhard Petruschke	DKW	(Germany) Walfried Winkler	DKW	(United Kingdom) John White	Norton	(United Kingdom) Jimmie Guthrie	Norton	Report
1936	Floreffe	(France) Jean Térigi	MM	(Germany) Arthur Geiß	DKW	(United Kingdom) Ted Mellors	Velocette	(United Kingdom) Jimmie Guthrie	Norton	Report
1935	Spa-Francorchamps	(Belgium) Maurice van Geert	Rush-Python	(Germany) Arthur Geiß	DKW	(United Kingdom) John White	Norton	(United Kingdom) Jimmie Guthrie	Norton	Report
1934	Spa-Francorchamps	(Belgium) Yvan Goor	Benelli	(Republic of Ireland) Henry Tyrell-Smith	Rudge	(United Kingdom) Jimmie Simpson	Norton	(United Kingdom) Wal Handley	Norton	Report
1933	Spa-Francorchamps	(Belgium) Yvan Goor	Benelli	(United Kingdom) Wal Handley	Moto Guzzi	(United Kingdom) Jimmie Guthrie	Norton	(United Kingdom) Tim Hunt	Norton	Report
1932	Spa-Francorchamps	(United Kingdom) Eric Fernihough	Excelsior	(United Kingdom) Ted Mellors	New Imperial	(United Kingdom) Jimmie Simpson	Norton	(Republic of Ireland) Stanley Woods	Norton	Report
1931	Spa-Francorchamps	(United Kingdom) Eric Fernihough	Excelsior	(United Kingdom) Ted Mellors	New Imperial	(United Kingdom) Jimmie Guthrie	Norton	(Republic of Ireland) Stanley Woods	Norton	Report
1930	Spa-Francorchamps	(Belgium) Yvan Goor	DKW	(United Kingdom) Syd Crabtree	Excelsior	(United Kingdom) Ernie Nott	Rudge	(Republic of Ireland) Henry Tyrell-Smith	Rudge	Report
1929	Spa-Francorchamps	(United Kingdom) Bert Kershaw	James	(United Kingdom) Jock Porter	New Gerrard	(United Kingdom) Wal Handley	Motosacoche	(United Kingdom) Charlie Dodson	Sunbeam	Report
1928	Spa-Francorchamps	(Germany) Arthur Geiß	DKW	(United Kingdom) Syd Crabtree	Excelsior	(Belgium) J. Treborg	La Mondiale-Blackburne	(United Kingdom) Charlie Dodson	Sunbeam	Report
1927	Spa-Francorchamps	(Germany) Arthur Geiß	DKW	(United Kingdom) Syd Crabtree	Crabtree-JAP	(United Kingdom) Jimmie Simpson	AJS	(Republic of Ireland) Stanley Woods	Norton	Report
1926	Spa-Francorchamps	(Belgium) René Milhoux	Ready-Blackburne	(United Kingdom) Jock Porter	New Gerrard	(United Kingdom) Frank Longman	AJS	(United Kingdom) Jimmie Simpson	AJS	Report
1925	Spa-Francorchamps	(Belgium) Norbert Vanneste	Ready-Blackburne	(United Kingdom) Jock Porter	New Gerrard	(United Kingdom) Wal Handley	Rex-Acme	(United Kingdom) Alec Bennett	Norton	Report
1924	Spa-Francorchamps	(United Kingdom) Geoff Davison	Levis	(United Kingdom) Bert Taylor	PA-Blackburne	(Republic of Ireland) Paddy Johnston	PA-Blackburne	(United Kingdom) Alec Bennett	Norton	Report
1923	Dinant-Feschaux			(United Kingdom) Wal Handley	Rex-Acme	(Belgium) Jean Huynen	FN	(United Kingdom) Freddie Dixon	Indian	Report
1922	Spa-Francorchamps			(United Kingdom) Geoff Davison	Levis	(United Kingdom) E. Remington	Rush-Blackburne	(Belgium) Gaston Antoine	Triumph	Report
1921	Spa-Francorchamps					(Belgium) Jean Kicken	Gillet	(United Kingdom) Hubert Hassall	Norton	Report
