= European Grand Prix (disambiguation) =

European Grand Prix can refer to:

- European Grand Prix, a Formula One motor race
- European motorcycle Grand Prix
- Speedway Grand Prix of Europe
- European Grand Prix for Choral Singing
- AIACR European Championship of grand prix racing in the 1930s
