= List of Grand Prix motorcycle racing European champions =

List of Grand Prix motorcycle racing FICM European Champions, from 1924 to 1939 and from 1981 to 2013, in order of year and engine displacement.

== By season ==
=== 1924–1939 ===
European Riders' Champions by season (1924-1939)
Year	1000 cc	750 cc	500 cc	350 cc	250 cc	175 cc	125 cc
1924			(Italy) Guido Mentasti (Moto Guzzi)	(United Kingdom) Jimmie Simpson (AJS)	(Belgium) Maurice van Geert (Rush/Blackburne)		
1925			(Italy) Mario Revelli (GR/JAP)	(Italy) Tazio Nuvolari (Bianchi)	(United Kingdom) Jock Porter (New Gerrard)	(Italy) Mario Vaga (Maffeis/Blackburne)	
1926			(United Kingdom) Jimmie Simpson (AJS)	(United Kingdom) Frank Longman (AJS)	(United Kingdom) Jock Porter (New Gerrard)	(Belgium) René Milhoux (Ready/Blackburne)	
1927	(Germany) Josef Giggenbach (Bayerland/JAP)	(Germany) Josef Stelzer (BMW)	(United Kingdom) Graham Walker (Sunbeam)	(United Kingdom) Jimmie Simpson (AJS)	(United Kingdom) Cecil Ashby (OK-Supreme)	(Germany) Willy Henkelmann (DKW)	
1928			(United Kingdom) Wal Handley (Motosacoche)	(United Kingdom) Wal Handley (Motosacoche)	(United Kingdom) Cecil Ashby (OK-Supreme)	(Italy) Alfredo Panella (Ladetto/Blatto)	(Switzerland) Paul Lehmann (Moser)
1929			(United Kingdom) Tim Hunt (Norton)	(United Kingdom) Leo Davenport (AJS)	(United Kingdom) Frank Longman (OK-Supreme)	(Germany) Josef Klein (DKW)	
1930			(Republic of Ireland) Henry Tyrell-Smith (Rudge)	(United Kingdom) Ernie Nott (Rudge)	(United Kingdom) Syd Crabtree (Excelsior)	(Belgium) Yvan Goor (DKW)	
1931			(United Kingdom) Tim Hunt (Norton)	(United Kingdom) Ernie Nott (Rudge)	(United Kingdom) Graham Walker (Rudge)	(United Kingdom) Eric Fernihough (Excelsior)	
1932			(Italy) Piero Taruffi (Norton)	(France) Louis Jeannin (Jonghi)	(Italy) Riccardo Brusi (Moto Guzzi)	(Italy) Carlo Baschieri (Benelli)	
1933			(Sweden) Gunnar Kalén (Husqvarna)	(United Kingdom) Jimmie Simpson (Norton)	(United Kingdom) Charlie Dodson (New Imperial)		
1934			(Belgium) Pol Demeuter (FN)	(United Kingdom) Jimmie Simpson (Norton)	(Germany) Walfried Winkler (DKW)	(Belgium) Yvan Goor (Benelli)	
1935			(United Kingdom) Jimmie Guthrie (Norton)	(United Kingdom) Wal Handley (Velocette)	(Germany) Arthur Geiß (DKW)		
1936			(United Kingdom) Jimmie Guthrie (Norton)	(United Kingdom) Freddie Frith (Norton)	(Republic of Ireland) Henry Tyrell-Smith (Excelsior)		
1937			(United Kingdom) Jimmie Guthrie (Norton)	(United Kingdom) Jimmie Guthrie (Norton)	(Italy) Omobono Tenni (Moto Guzzi)		
1938			(Germany) Georg Meier (BMW)	(United Kingdom) Ted Mellors (Velocette)	(Germany) Ewald Kluge (DKW)		
1939			(Italy) Dorino Serafini (Gilera)	(Germany) Heiner Fleischmann (DKW)	(Germany) Ewald Kluge (DKW)		

=== 1947–1948 ===
European Riders' Champions by season (1947-1948)
Year	500 cc	350 cc	250 cc	Sidecars
1947	(Italy) Omobono Tenni (Moto Guzzi)	(United Kingdom) Fergus Anderson (Velocette)	(Italy) Bruno Francisci (Moto Guzzi)	(Italy) Luigi Cavanna / Paolo Cavanna (Moto Guzzi)
1948	(Italy) Enrico Lorenzetti (Moto Guzzi)	(United Kingdom) Freddie Frith (Velocette)	(United Kingdom) Maurice Cann (Moto Guzzi)	

=== 1981–1989 ===
European Riders' Champions by season (1981–1989)
Year	500 cc	250 cc	125 cc	50 cc
1981	(Italy) Leandro Becheroni (Suzuki)	(Germany) Herbert Hauf (Yamaha)	(Italy) Pierluigi Aldrovandi (MBA)	(Italy) Giuseppe Ascareggi (Minarelli)
1982	(Italy) Fabio Biliotti (Suzuki)	(Germany) Reinhold Roth (FKN-Yamaha)	(Italy) Stefano Caracchi (MBA)	(Socialist Federal Republic of Yugoslavia) Zdravko Matulja (Tomos)
Year	500 cc	250 cc	125 cc	80 cc
1983	(Sweden) Peter Sköld (Suzuki)	(Spain) Carlos Cardús (Kobas/Rotax)	(Germany) Willy Hupperich (MBA)	(Germany) Hubert Abold (Zündapp)
1984	(Finland) Eero Hyvärinen (Suzuki)	(United Kingdom) Gary Noel (Exactweld)	(Germany) Norbert Peschke (MBA)	(Germany) Richard Bay (Rupp)
1985	(Switzerland) Marco Gentile (Yamaha)	(Italy) Massimo Matteoni (Honda)	(Italy) Pierfrancesco Chili (MBA)	(Germany) Günter Schirnhofer (Rupp)
1986	(Italy) Massimo Messere (Honda)	(Austria) Hans Lindner (Rotax)	(Italy) Claudio Macciotta (MBA)	(Italy) Bruno Casanova (Unimoto)
1987	(Germany) Manfred Fischer (Honda)	(Andorra) Xavier Cardelús (JJ Cobas/Rotax)	(Germany) Adolf Stadler (MBA)	(Spain) Julián Miralles (Derbi)
1988	(Italy) Alberto Rota (Honda)	(Italy) Fausto Ricci (Yamaha/Aprilia)	(Italy) Emilio Cuppini (Garelli)	(Bulgaria) Bogdan Nikolov (Krauser)
1989	(Sweden) Peter Lindén (Honda)	(Italy) Andrea Borgonovo (Aprilia)	(Italy) Gabriele Debbia (Aprilia)	(Spain) Jaime Mariano (Casal)

=== 1990–2007 ===
European Riders' Champions by season (1990–2007)
Year	250cc	125cc
1990	(Netherlands) Leon van der Heijen (Aprilia)	(Spain) Xavier Debón (JJ Cobas/Rotax)
1991	(Italy) Max Biaggi (Aprilia)	(Germany) Oliver Koch (Honda)
1992	(Spain) Luis Carlos Maurel (Aprilia)	(Spain) Juan Borja (Honda)
1993	(Italy) Giuseppe Fiorillo (Aprilia)	(Italy) Stefano Perugini (Aprilia)
1994	(France) Régis Laconi (Honda)	(Italy) Ivan Cremonini (Honda)
1995	(Italy) Luca Boscoscuro (Aprilia)	(Italy) Lucio Cecchinello (Honda)
1996	(Argentina) Sebastián Porto (Aprilia)	(Spain) Jorge Martínez (Aprilia)
1997	(Italy) Davide Bulega (Aprilia)	(France) Arnaud Vincent (Aprilia)
1998	(Germany) Alex Hofmann (Honda)	(Italy) Max Sabbatani (Aprilia)
1999	(Italy) Ivan Clementi (Aprilia)	(Germany) Klaus Nöhles (Honda)
2000	(Italy) Riccardo Chiarello (Aprilia)	(Italy) Diego Giugovaz (Aprilia)
2001	(Spain) David García (Honda)	(Italy) Andrea Dovizioso (Aprilia)
2002	(Spain) Álvaro Molina (Aprilia)	(Italy) Marco Simoncelli (Aprilia)
2003	(Japan) Taro Sekiguchi (Yamaha)	(Italy) Mattia Angeloni (Honda)
2004	(Spain) Álvaro Molina (Aprilia)	(Italy) Michele Pirro (Aprilia)
2005	(Spain) Álvaro Molina (Aprilia)	(Italy) Michele Conti (Honda)
2006	(Spain) Álvaro Molina (Aprilia)	(Austria) Philipp Eitzinger (Honda)
2007	(Spain) Álvaro Molina (Aprilia)	(Hungary) Alen Győrfi (Honda)

=== 2008–2013 ===
European Riders' Champions by season (2008–2013)
Year	125cc
2008	(Italy) Lorenzo Savadori (Aprilia)
2009	(Germany) Marcel Schrötter (Honda)
2010	(Spain) Maverick Viñales (Aprilia)
2011	(Italy) Romano Fenati (Aprilia)
Year	Moto3
2012	(Italy) Matteo Ferrari (Honda)
2013	(Czech Republic) Karel Hanika (KTM)

== By rider (1924–1939) ==
Multiple European Championship holders:

Rider	Titles
(United Kingdom) Jimmie Simpson	5 (1 x 500 cc, 4 x 350 cc)
(United Kingdom) Jimmie Guthrie	4 (3 x 500 cc, 1 x 350 cc)
(United Kingdom) Wal Handley	3 (1 x 500 cc, 2 x 350 cc)
(United Kingdom) Tim Hunt	2 (2 x 500 cc)
(Republic of Ireland) Henry Tyrell-Smith	2 (1 x 500 cc, 1 x 250 cc)
(United Kingdom) Graham Walker	2 (1 x 500 cc, 1 x 250 cc)
(United Kingdom) Ernie Nott	2 (2 x 350 cc)
(United Kingdom) Frank Longman	2 (1 x 350 cc, 1 x 250 cc)
(United Kingdom) Cecil Ashby	2 (2 x 250 cc)
(Germany) Ewald Kluge	2 (2 x 250 cc)
(United Kingdom) Jock Porter	2 (2 x 250 cc)
(Belgium) Yvan Goor	2 (2 x 175 cc)
