= Ted Mellors =

English motorcycle road racer

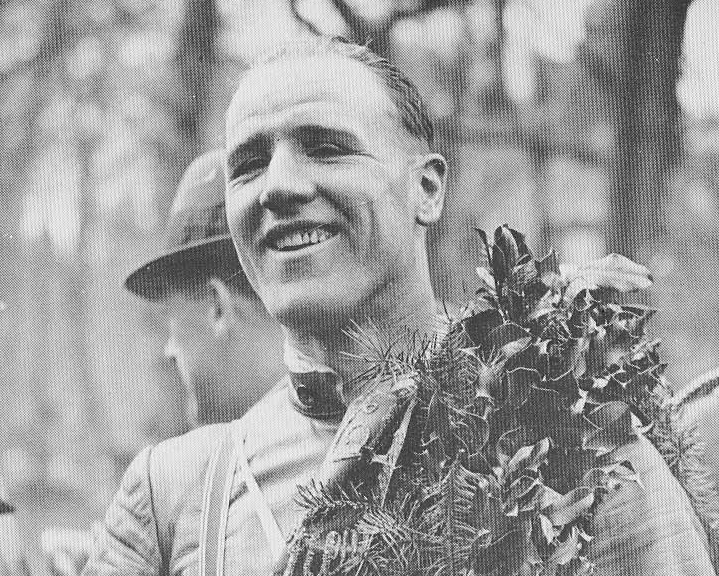
- Ted Mellors at the 1936 Eilenriede
- Nationality: British
- Born: 10 April 1907; Chesterfield, England
- Died: 7 June 1946 (aged 39); Birmingham, England
Motorcycle racing career statistics
Isle of Man TT career
TTs contested	12 (1928-1939)
TT wins	1
First TT win	1939 Lightweight TT
Last TT win	1939 Lightweight TT
TT podiums	4

Edward Ambrose Mellors (10 April 1907 – 7 June 1946) was an English international motorcycle road racer who rode in the Manx Grand Prix in 1927 and the Isle of Man TT from 1928 to 1939. He was the 350 cc European Champion in 1938, but died in 1946, overcome by exhaust fumes while working in a new home's poorly ventilated garage.

== Personal life ==
Mellors was born in Chesterfield, Derbyshire, one of five sons of a wheelwright and a clergyman's daughter. Two of his brothers drowned in a local canal as children. He wanted to be an International motorcycle racer and spent a lot of time riding in the Derbyshire hills. Mellors met his future wife when he was still 15. She was 21, so he lied about his age. After seven months, they got married. In 1936, when Mellors became a works rider for Velocette, they moved south to Shirley near Birmingham. They had two daughters, Gladys and Joan.

== Racing ==
After initially riding in the TT races, Mellors started riding in Continental events. Mellors was one of a few pre-World War II British riders who realised that they could probably make more money by racing regularly in Grand Prix motorcycle racing events on the Continent. He won the French Grand Prix several times, in 1930 (250cc), 1936 (350cc) and 1937 (350cc and 500cc), as well as the Belgian Grand Prix in 1931, 1932 (250 cc), 1936 and 1939 (350cc).

In 1938, Mellors won the title of 350 cc European Champion, awarded at the Dutch TT races. Mellors also won the Dutch TT in the 250cc class in 1932 and 1933.

In 1927, Benelli produced a SOHC 175 cc model. In 1930, this became DOHC, and in 1935 the capacity was increased to 250 cc. With this machine, Mellors won the Lightweight 1939 Isle of Man TT.

== World War II ==
During World War II, Mellors worked in munitions and was with the volunteer fire service. He applied, but was not accepted for the Air Force due to slightly defective eyesight, despite already having a private air pilot's licence.

Mellors designed and patented a rotary valve system in the early 1940s, during World War II. He was issued Patent 559830, in March 1944.

Mellors also wrote magazine articles and had an unpublished fictionalised biography.

According to motorcycle racing writer Paul Guthrie, there is evidence that Mellors was in contact with British intelligence agents until at least the end of 1939, and that he was on the Gestapo's "most wanted" list during World War II, although his activities are still unknown.

== Accidental death ==
In 1946, two days after moving into a new home in Etwall Road, Hall Green, Birmingham, Mellors was overcome by exhaust fumes while working on a car, and it was his daughter Joan, arriving home from school, who found him. The Birmingham Coroner's Court recorded a verdict of accidental death. He was 39 years old.

== Sources ==
Sporting positions
Preceded by Jimmie Guthrie	350cc Motorcycle European Champion; 1938	Succeeded by Heiner Fleischmann
