= Jock Porter =

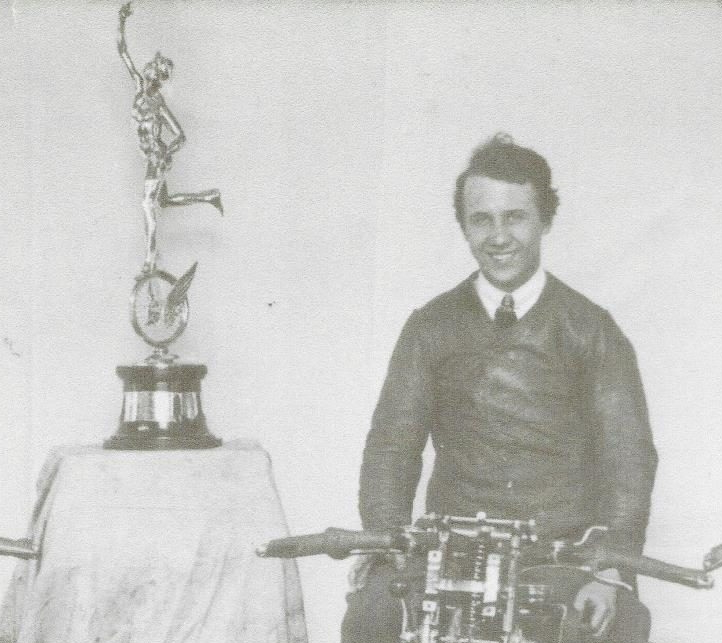
- Jock Porter next to an Isle of Man TT trophy after winning the 1923 Lightweight TT
- Born: John Adam Porter; 1894
- Died: 20 November 1952 (age 58)
- Resting place: Comely Bank Cemetery, Edinburgh Scotland
- Known for: Motorcycle racing; Motorcycle building

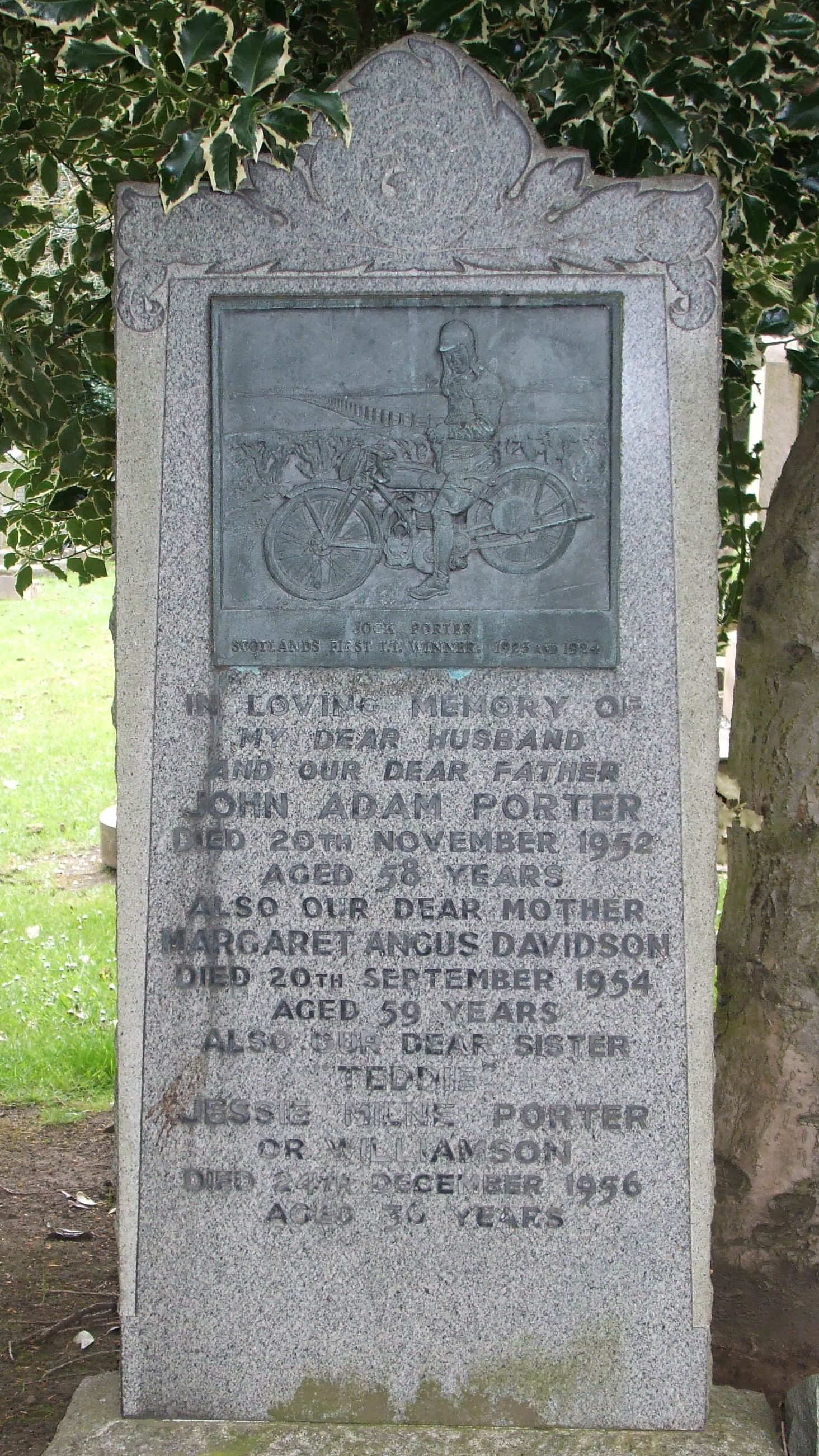
Porter's grave at Comely Bank Cemetery, Edinburgh

John Adam Porter (1894–1952) was the first Scotsman to win the Isle of Man TT motorcycle race, and was a European Grand Prix motorcycle racing champion.

Porter was deaf, due to an infection he had when he was young.

== Career ==
From 1922 to 1940, Porter also marketed his brand of motorcycle, New Gerrard. Riding these bikes, he competed in the 1922 Junior TT, but retired early. In 1923, he won the 250cc TT at an average speed of 51.93 mph (83.57 km/h), and in 1924, he won the first Ultra-Lightweight TT (175cc), at an average speed of 51.21 mph (82.41 km/h). During practices for the 1927 TT races, Porter suffered a badly cut face after a collision with a Norton motorcycle ridden by H. Mathews, but decided to keep racing for the rest of the event. Although he never suffered any serious injuries, Porter's TT career was hampered by many retirements, as he finished only 4 races out of 22 starts.

Porter also won the Belgian motorcycle Grand Prix at 250cc three times, in 1925, 1926 and 1929 and the same class in the German motorcycle Grand Prix of 1926. He was 250 cc motorcycle European champion for 1925 and 1926.

Porter was nicknamed the "Solitary Scot", due to his habit of travelling alone through Europe to compete in international races on his bikes.

== Legacy ==
Porter died on 20 November 1952 and is buried at Comely Bank Cemetery, Edinburgh, along with his wife Margaret.

Glasgow Museums have Porter's New Gerrard Blackburne 248cc of 1923 in their collection, having acquired it in 1976. As of 2015, it is in storage, and so not on public display.

In 2008, two albums of photographs and postcards of TT races, from 1921 onwards, which once belonged to Porter, were sold at auction by Bonhams for £3,220 (including premium). In 2012, his granddaughter showed some of his trophies and other memorabilia, on the BBC programme Antiques Roadshow.
