= Benelli (motorcycles) =

Italian motorcycle company

Benelli Q.J.
- Benelli Logo
- Type: Subsidiary
- Industry: Motorcycle manufacturing
- Founded: 1911; 115 years ago
- Founder: Teresa Boni Benelli and her children: Giuseppe Benelli; Giovanni Benelli; Francesco Benelli; Filippo Benelli; Domenico Benelli; Antonio "Tonino" Benelli
- Headquarters: Pesaro, Marche, Italy
- Area served: Worldwide
- Key people: Yan Haimei (CEO)
- Products: Motorcycles; Scooters; E-bike
- Parent: Qianjiang Motorcycle (2005–Present)
- Website: www.benelli.com
- Footnotes; Slogan: Pura passione dal 1911. (Pure passion since 1911.)

Benelli Q.J. is an Italian motorcycle company, based in the city of Pesaro in the Marche region.

In 2005 Benelli was acquired by Qianjiang Motorcycle, a Chinese company owned by the Geely Holding Group. Originally founded in 1911 in Pesaro, Benelli is the second oldest Italian motorcycle company still in business.

Design, development and marketing activities are carried out at the Benelli QJ headquarters in Pesaro, Italy, in synergy with the parent company of Wenling, China where motorcycles are produced.

== History ==
=== From founding to World War II ===
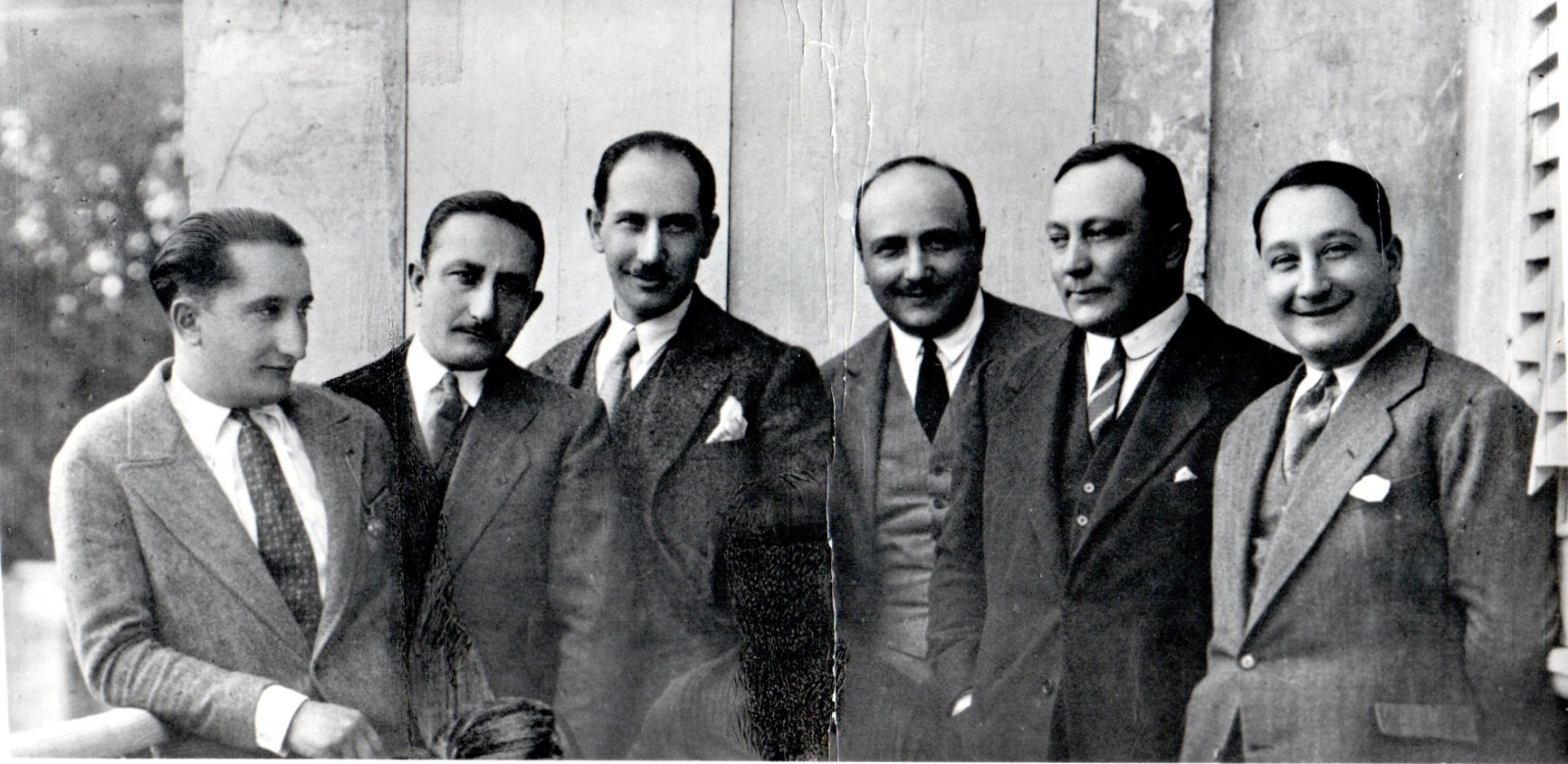
The six Benelli brothers. From left: Tonino, Francesco, Giovanni, Giuseppe, Filippo and Domenico (1929)

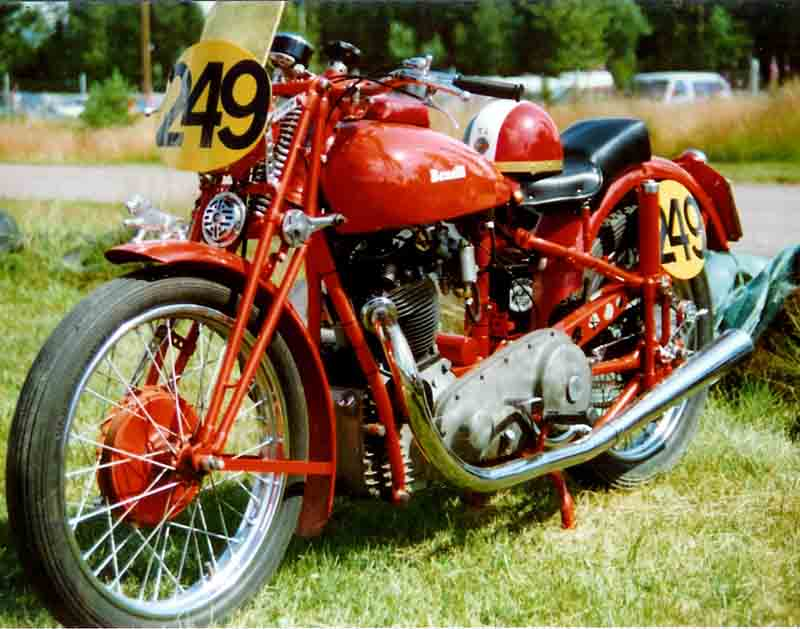
Benelli Monalbero Sport 500 cc (1935)

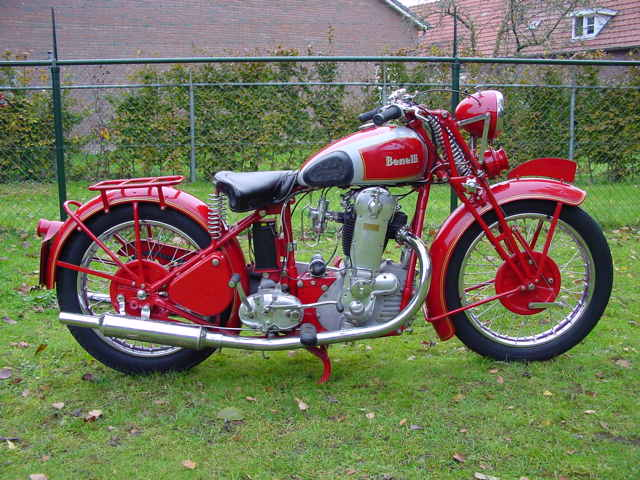
Benelli 500 Turismo Normale (1935)

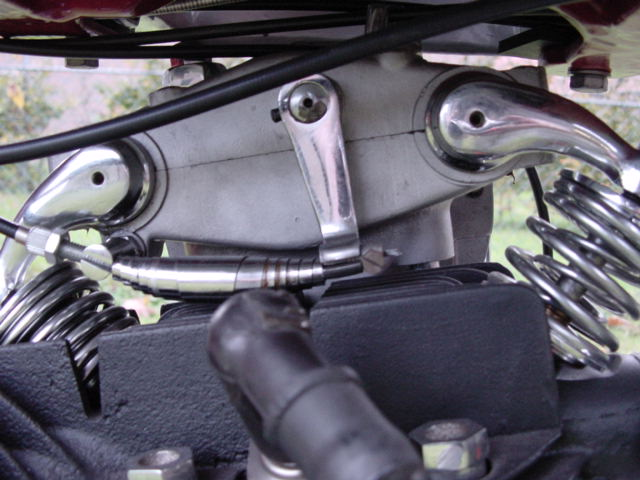
Engine of Benelli Turismo

Benelli was established in Pesaro, Italy in 1911, which possibly makes it the oldest of Italian motorcycle factories in operation. (Moto Guzzi—the oldest motorcycle factory in non-stop operation—was established in 1921, and Peugeot is the world's oldest and still producing motorcycle factory due to establishing in 1898.) After losing her husband, the widow Teresa Boni Benelli invested all of the family capital into the business in the hope that it would offer stable work for her six sons: Giuseppe, Giovanni, Francesco, Filippo, Domenico and Antonio ("Tonino"). She also sent Giuseppe and Giovanni to study Engineering in Switzerland. Initially the business had 6 employees in addition to the 5 brothers working (Tonino didn't work because he was too young.)

In the beginning, it was just the Benelli Garage, which repaired bicycles and motorcycles, but was already able to produce all of the spare parts needed for repairs. During World War I, Benelli worked hard fixing parts for the Italian machines in the war and in 1919 the first motorcycle was presented to the public. In 1920 the company built its first complete engine in-house, a single-cylinder two-stroke 75 cc model, immediately adapted to a bicycle frame. A year later in 1921, Benelli built its first motorcycle, using their own engine which had by then become a 98 cc model.

But the most successful engine, which made Benelli known in the national and international field, was the 175 cm^{3} 4-stroke with "cascade" distribution and overhead camshaft of 1927, a solution that soon became the "trademark" of the Pesaro house. Giuseppe Benelli was inspired by a theoretical study of an engine by Edward Turner published in 1925 in the French magazine Moto Revue. Giuseppe, in order to beat the competition, did not waste time and completely reinterpreted that project introducing a simple solution to eliminate the negative effects of thermal expansion that afflicted these applications.

The five cylindrical gears with straight teeth of the distribution (one of the crankshaft, three idle, one of the camshaft) were inserted (cascade) in a thin aluminum folder placed on the right side of the engine, on the top of which was mounted the "castelletto" of the distribution with the camshaft and barbells annexed. The whole was fixed to the engine head not rigidly, but leaving the coupling with a degree of freedom. The solution consisted in inserting two screws with the stem partially threaded (columns) in two holes in the castle and screwed on two of the four prisoners of the thermal head. The threaded part joined firmly to the head, while the part of the threaded screw created a free, but very precise coupling with the two holes in the castle. The screws were tightened so as not to "crush" the castle, but so that they could leave a play of a few tenths of a millimeter sufficient to the two "blocks" (folder-castle/ cylinder-head) to flow over each other in the phase of expansion by the effect of heat, without interfering and creating those deformations that would have made the system unreliable. This solution was patented in 1927 and began the commercial and sporting success of Benelli, which lasted until the outbreak of World War II. (Patent No. 255634 of 29 Oct. 1927 "Arrangement for forming and fixing the transmission box for controlling the distribution shaft at the head in combustion engines")

Two years after that, using a version specially designed for competitions, Tonino "the terrible" took to the track. He embarked on a career which confirmed the company's capacity for development and production. Riding a Benelli 175, Tonino Benelli won four Italian championship titles in five years: in 1927, 1928 and 1930 with engine single overhead camshaft (SOHC) version, and in 1931 with the double overhead camshaft (DOHC) version. In 1932, a crash in the GP of the Tigullio put an end to his career; on 27 September 1937 Tonino died following a road accident.

As World War II loomed, the Benelli company debuted with a motorcycles with engine four-cylinder in line supercharged 250cc designed for racing with double overhead camshaft, liquid cooled and with a vane compressor, credited with a maximum power of 52 hp at 10,000 rev/min and a maximum speed of 230 km/h. This motorcycle was intended to compete in the 1940 season to try to bissare the Benelli's success in the 1939 Isle of Man TT Lightweight 250 cc race, but the outbreak of the Second World War will frustrate all efforts and this solution (banned in the post-war period) will never be used in official competitions.

=== After World War II ===
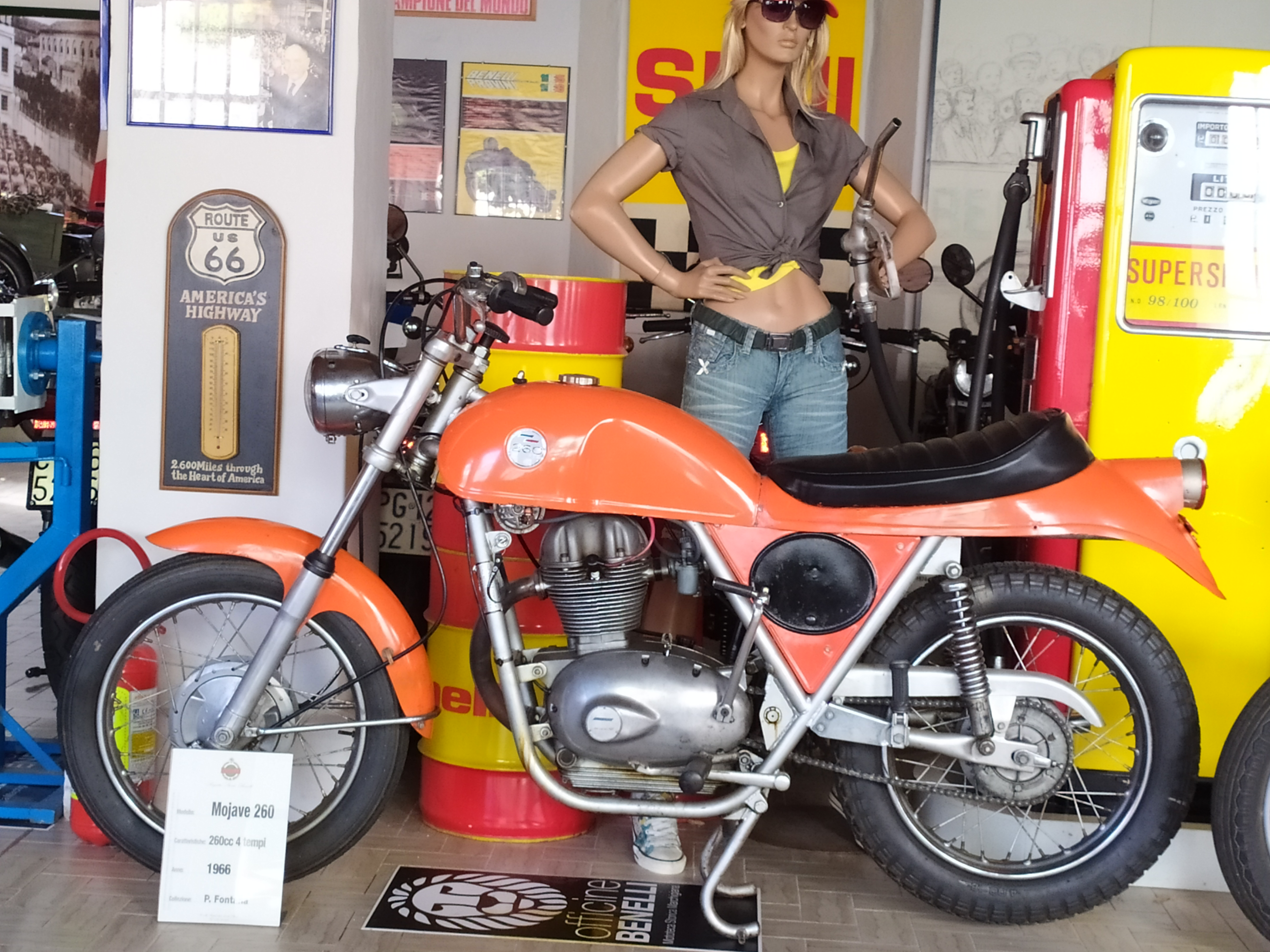
Benelli Mojave

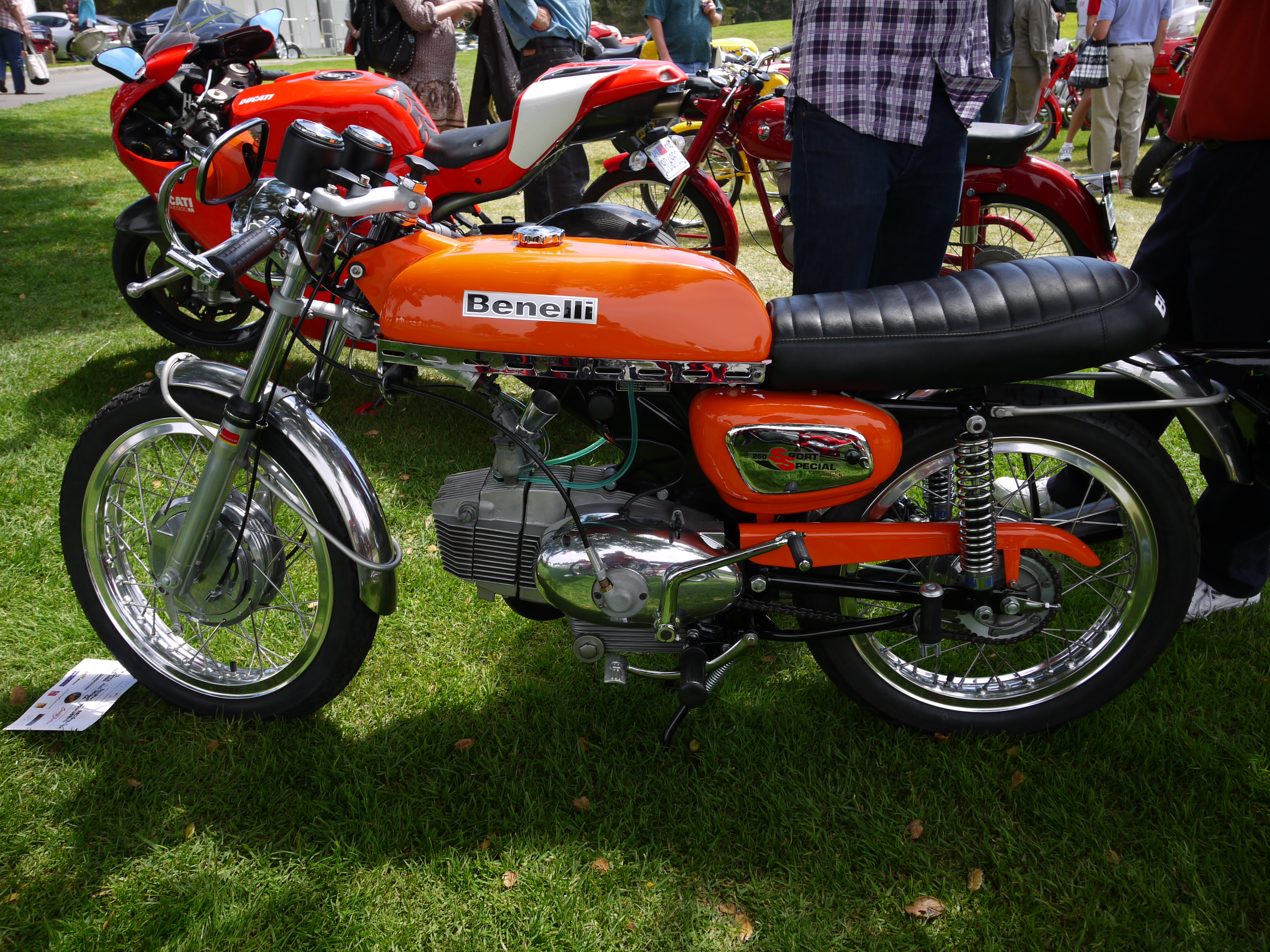
Benelli 250 Sport Special MKIII 1971

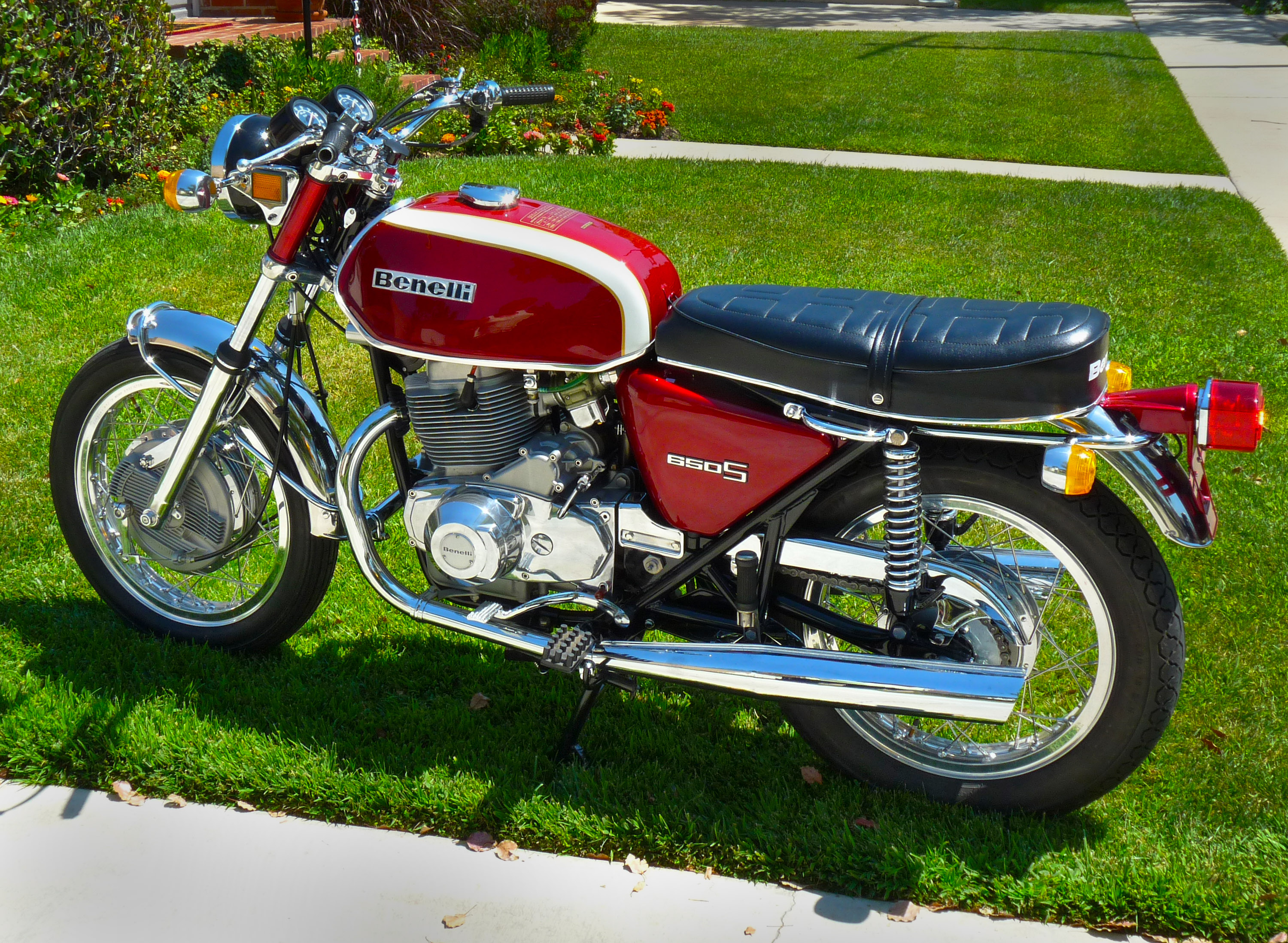
Benelli Tornado 650 S 1972

At the end of the conflict, much of the factory was destroyed, the equipment dispersed or damaged and it took three or four years to restart the business in a situation of precariousness and misery. To replenish the scarce financial resources, the Benelli acquired a thousand motorcycles abandoned by the belligerent armies on the battlefields to refurbish them for civil use.

Giuseppe Benelli, after irreconcilable disputes with his brothers about productive strategies, split from the company to found first the BBC Automobili in 1946 and after MotoBi in 1952. The management of Benelli factory will pass to the second brother Giovanni who, although not having the design talents of his older brother, had great organizational skills having always managed the productive apparatus of the company. Under his direction Giovanni provides designers with the guidelines of the model of rebirth: the new motorcycle must be light, reliable and cheap. This is how the Letizia model was born, equipped with a two-stroke engine (cheaper than 4-stroke) of 98 cm^{3} with four bench bearings, mounted on an essential frame, but elastic on both axes. ″Letizia″ will be the motorcycle forerunner of the most famous model of the Benelli postwar: the ″Leoncino″ (little lion). It was produced from 1950 to 1960 in about 45,000 units, the most common motorization was the 125 cm^{3} 2 stroke, but also 150 cm^{3} for the version "three wheel" and 125 cm^{3} 4 stroke with distribution to "cascade of gears", immediately abandoned solution for reliability problems.

Since the 1960s, at a time of major market crisis in Italy, Benelli has been saving its balance with exports to the US. In the sixties he chose two different routes to sell overseas: via the importer Cosmopolitan and with the Montgomery Ward and presented the following models:

- Tornado 650: the twin-cylinder maxi was marketed first in the US and then in Europe. The superstructures are completely different, but the peculiarity is the chassis type Metisse, wanted by Steve McQueen. The actor was the image of the importer Cosmopolitan and Montgomery Ward. The ″Tornado″ earned a reputation for reliability and high performance, despite its somewhat hefty weight at 480 pounds (220 kg). Benelli claimed at the time of launch that the Tornado was capable of 57 hp at 7,400rpm for a top speed of 117 mph. The Tornado (later the Tornado S) was discontinued after 1974, when Benelli introduced a series of "multis" intended to compete with Japanese triples and fours.
- Mojave 260/360: used the chassis and superstructures of the Tornado while the 4-stroke engine was an increase of 175 cc. The motorbike, proposed also in preparation Scrambler, could be bought in store.
- Buzzer/Hurricane/Dynamo/Hornet: small wheeled scooter with 65 cc engine (instead of 50 cc sold in Italy). Compared to the models sold in Italy, the names and some details changed.
- Volcano: low-wheeled "scooter" derived from the Mini Cross but with a displacement of 180 cc.

=== The management of Alejandro de Tomaso ===
Towards the end of the 1960s, the arrival of Japanese manufacturers caused a crisis in the European motorcycle industry. The original Benelli company was heavily involved in the American motorcycle market, selling motorcycles under 350cc through Montgomery Ward. The advent of competition from Japan led to Benelli products (still largely of single cylinder pushrod design) losing popularity as they were perceived as old-fashioned in comparison to Hondas of the era which sported overhead cam engines with electric starters, in much the same way as the British motorcycle manufacturers such as Norton, BSA and Triumph were affected in the larger capacity sector.

The Benelli, in obvious economic difficulty, will be purchased by the Italian-Argentine industrialist Alejandro de Tomaso, who was undoubtedly one of the most discussed and powerful figures in Italy in the '60s, '70s and '80s. In 1959 he founded De Tomaso automobili in Modena and made his own series of road and racing cars. He then acquired a number of Italian companies such as Maserati, Innocenti, Ghia and Vignale and then, in 1971, Benelli and the competitor Moto Guzzi in 1973. De Tomaso therefore had many diversified interests, acquired companies in difficulty and then restructured them and tried to sell them back, pocketing the capital gains. His approach evidently had no forward-looking industrial continuity, so that in his acquisitions there were more "shadows" than "lights". Benelli is no exception, which will live the most troubled period of its centenary history.

The Italian-Argentine manager, in order to challenge the Japanese manufacturers, immediately asks the designers to copy a Honda CB500 Four engine to save time and money. Thus was born the 500 Quattro (1974) which will be the basis of the 750 Sei with its six-cylinder engine in line, first in the world on a road motorcycle. Experts in the field judged the 750 Sei an easy-to-ride motorcycles, with good engine elasticity, exceptional roadholding and excellent brakes. The only downside was the ignition that had to bring the power at the right time to the candles. In 1974 it became "Moto dell'anno" and in 1975 there were the first deliveries. It had a top speed of 200 km/h, 75 hp at 9500 rpm and was produced in 3200 units until 1977. This industrial policy, combined with little investment in plant and research, with a quality of materials that is not up to the competition, with a lack of distribution and after-sales network, will soon prove to be harmful. Then, the final blow, will be caused by the merger with the acerrima and historical rival (in racing) Moto Guzzi in the Guzzi-Benelli Moto (G.B.M. S.p.a.) that will transform the Benelli in an empty box.

Benelli motorcycles from the 1970s and 1980s, particularly the 750 Sei, often command higher prices than their contemporaries on the secondhand market.

=== The management of Andrea Merloni ===
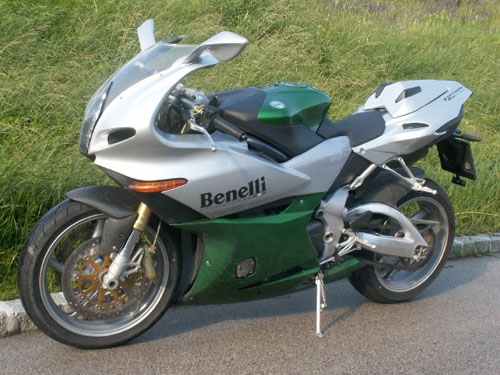
2003 Benelli Tornado Tre 900

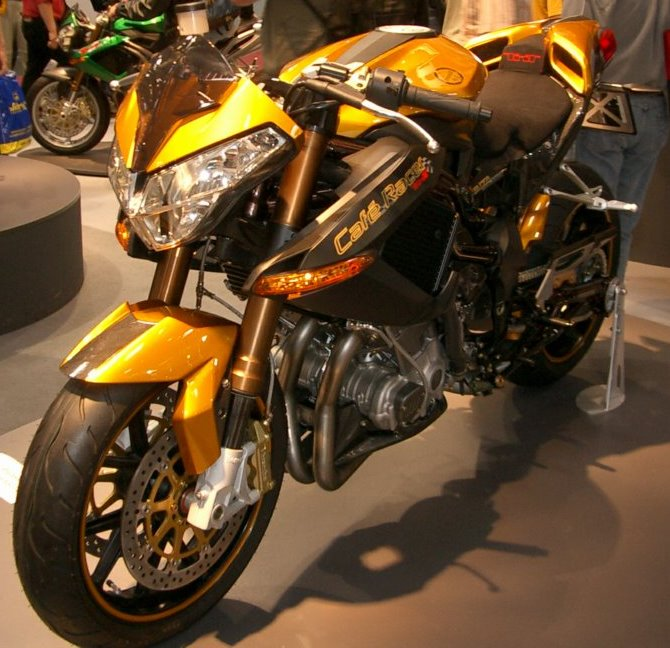
Benelli Tnt Cafè Racer 1130cc 2004

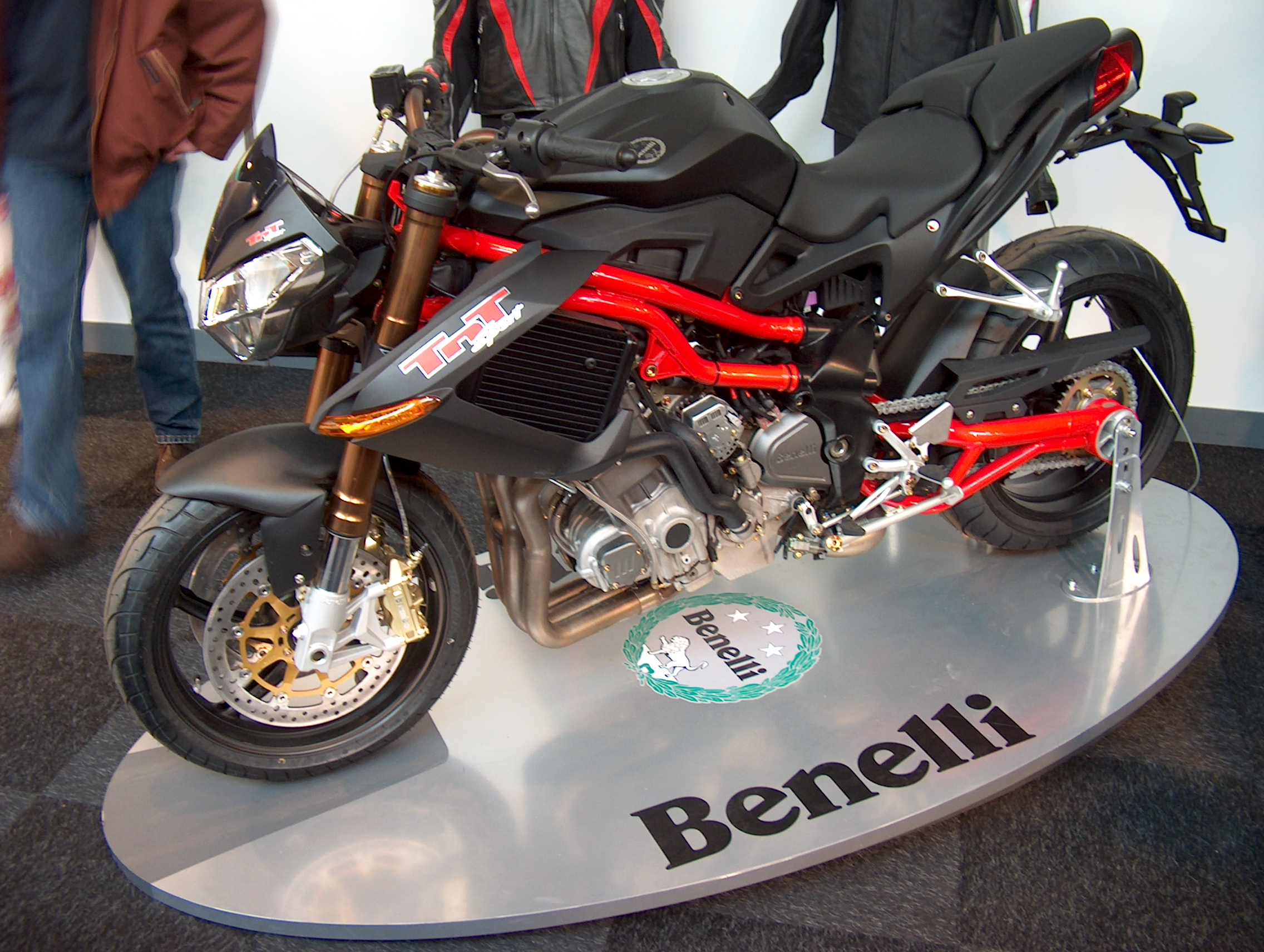
Benelli Tnt 1130cc Sport

After a failed attempt of rebirth in 1989 supported by the Pesaro industrialist Giancarlo Selci, operating in the field of woodworking machinery and ex machine operator in the Benelli factory, in December 1995 there was the decisive turning point: 28-year-old Andrea Merloni, passionate motorcyclist and scion of the family of the Marche household appliance dynasty, decided to take over the Benelli brand. The first step was opening the current factory at Strada della Fornace Vecchia. Merloni then launched a series of scooters and maximoto to give immediate oxygen to the crates and organize the sales network.

In just over a year from the acquisition, the first new products were placed on the market such as models Adiva (in the displacement 125 and 150) equipped with rigid canopy foldable in the trunk (first scooter in the world to be equipped with this mechanism, then copied by the competition), the Velvet (in the displacement 125, 150, 250, 400) which remained in the list until 2012, the 491, popular among fourteen-year-olds of the time, that mounted a horizontal Morini engine of 50 cm^{3} at 2 times with liquid cooling and that made it one of the most performing of the lot, the K2 (50 and 100 cm^{3}) and the Pepe (of 50 cm^{3}); the latter, powered by a Minarelli engine, had commercial success.

In 1999, the technician Riccardo Rosa (ex Cagiva) was hired and was then presented the new Tornado Tre, a sports bike (900 cm^{3}, then brought to 1130 cm^{3}), with interesting technological innovations. It was in fact a pure sports bike, equipped with a 3-cylinder engine in-line that presented a new arrangement of the cooling radiator positioned under the rear tail and equipped with two forced air extraction fans of spectacular effect and a new "mixed" frame consists of a die-cast aluminium and steel tubes joined with a technology of aeronautical origin. The Tornado Tre 900 super sport bike was launched in 2002, and the TNT, roadster some years later.

"The races improve the breed" and Merloni, a former driver, knew it well so the next step was to prepare the new Tornado for the races. As per his style, Merloni immediately began to run in 2001 and 2002 in the World Superbike Championship with the Australian rider Peter Goddard, who with his long experience has been able to give directions to improve the bike and consequently also the series. Given that the team was at the start and fierce competition, the results were higher than expected with a 36th place in the final classification in 2001 (with 7 points) and a 22nd place in 2002 (with 23 points). A limited version of the Tornado (named the Tornado LE, where LE stands for Limited Edition) was built.

The results of the new Benelli are encouraging but the strong investments for the Tornado are not compensated by sales and even Andrea Merloni decides to stop.

=== Current Qianjiang ownership ===
In 2005, Benelli was acquired by Qianjiang Motor Group, a Chinese company which has been controlled by the Geely Holding Group since 2015.

The Qianjiang Group is a Chinese manufacturer of small motorcycles and engines, which already owns the Keeway and Generic brands. Qianjiang decided to maintain production and engineering in Pesaro, entrusting the company to sole administrator Yan Haimei. The production of motorcycles started almost immediately with the assembly of 3-cylinder engines (previously performed by Franco Morini Motori) brought back to the marque. The scooter range also restarted with engines of Chinese origin.

For 12 years Benelli QJ carried out the projects and production of the previous management. 2016 was a breakthrough year, with coincided with the acquisition of Qianjiang Group by the Geely Holding Group. The Leoncino 500 and the TRK 500 are made in Wenling, China. Both motorcycles have the same 500 cc twin-cylinder 4 valve, double camshaft engine. The Leoncino is a "naked" bike with historic reference to past models. It comes in two versions, a roadster with 17" cast wheels, and a scrambler with longer suspension and spoked wheels. The TRK 500 is an "Adventure Bike" made for long-distance touring. It also comes in two models, the base model with cast 17" rims is a road touring machine, and the TRK502X is a more dirt-oriented machine. It has more suspension travel, spoked wheels, and a 2" higher seat height. In general, the success of TRK has been overwhelming. In 2020 it was by far the best-selling model in Italy. Benelli currently offers a very wide range of models from 125 single cylinder (135cc in some markets) to 300, 500, 750 twin cylinder and 600 four cylinder models.

== Current products ==
=== Naked ===
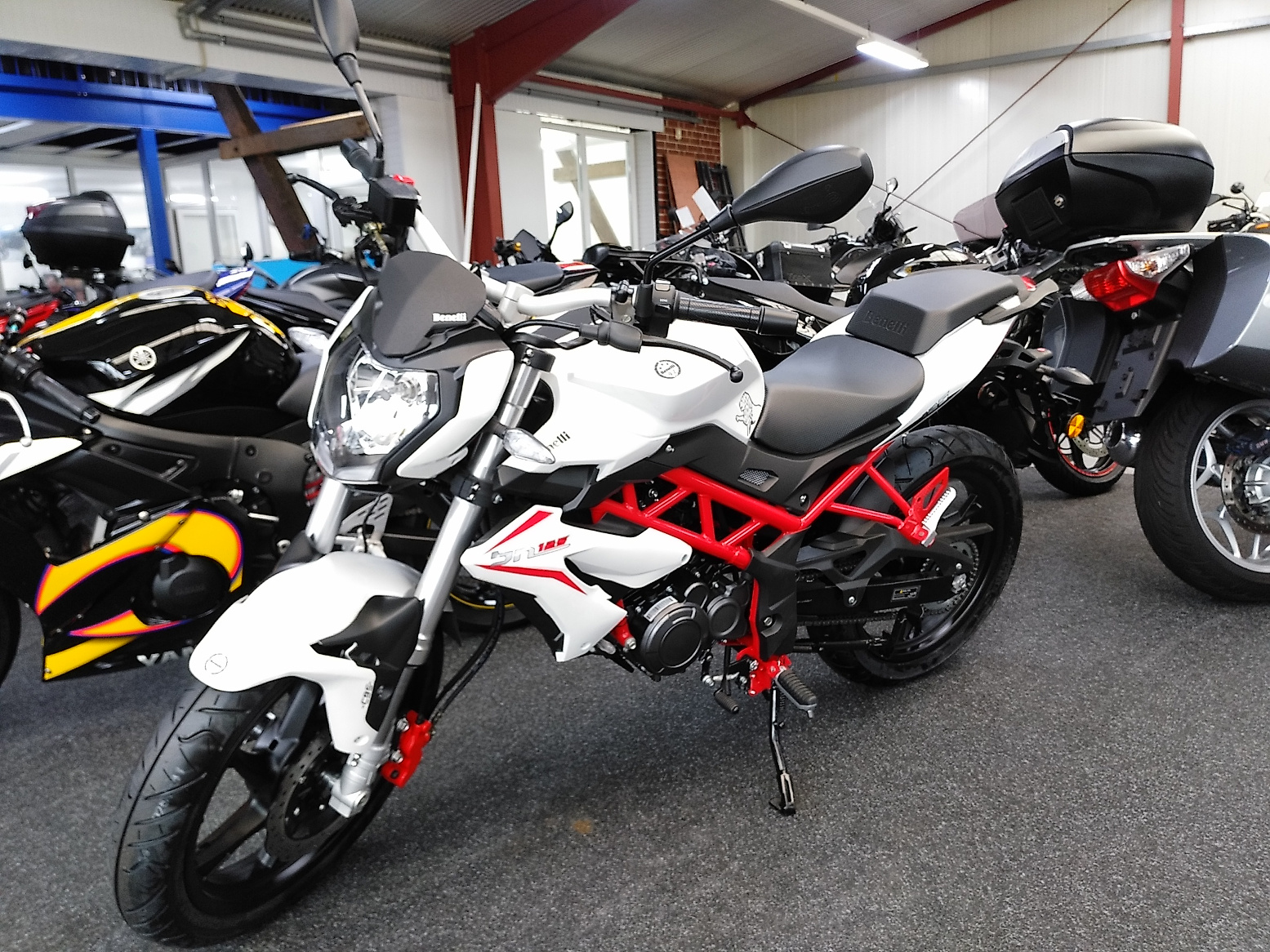
Benelli BN 125

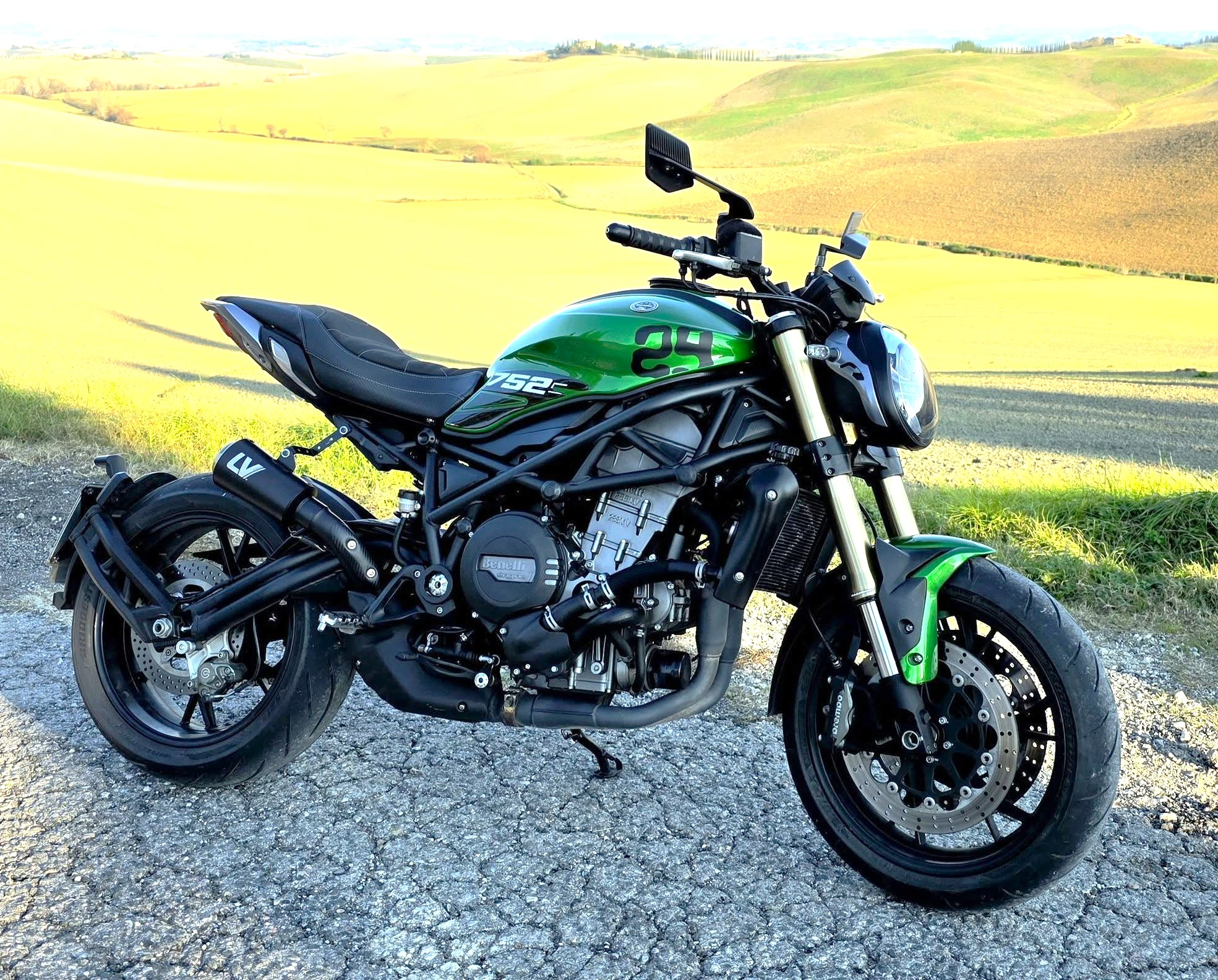
Benelli 752S

- BN 125
- BKX 125S
- 752S
- 502C

=== Sport ===
- Tornado 550

=== Touring ===
- BKX 125
- TRK 502 X
- TRK 702
- TRK 702 X

=== Scramblers ===
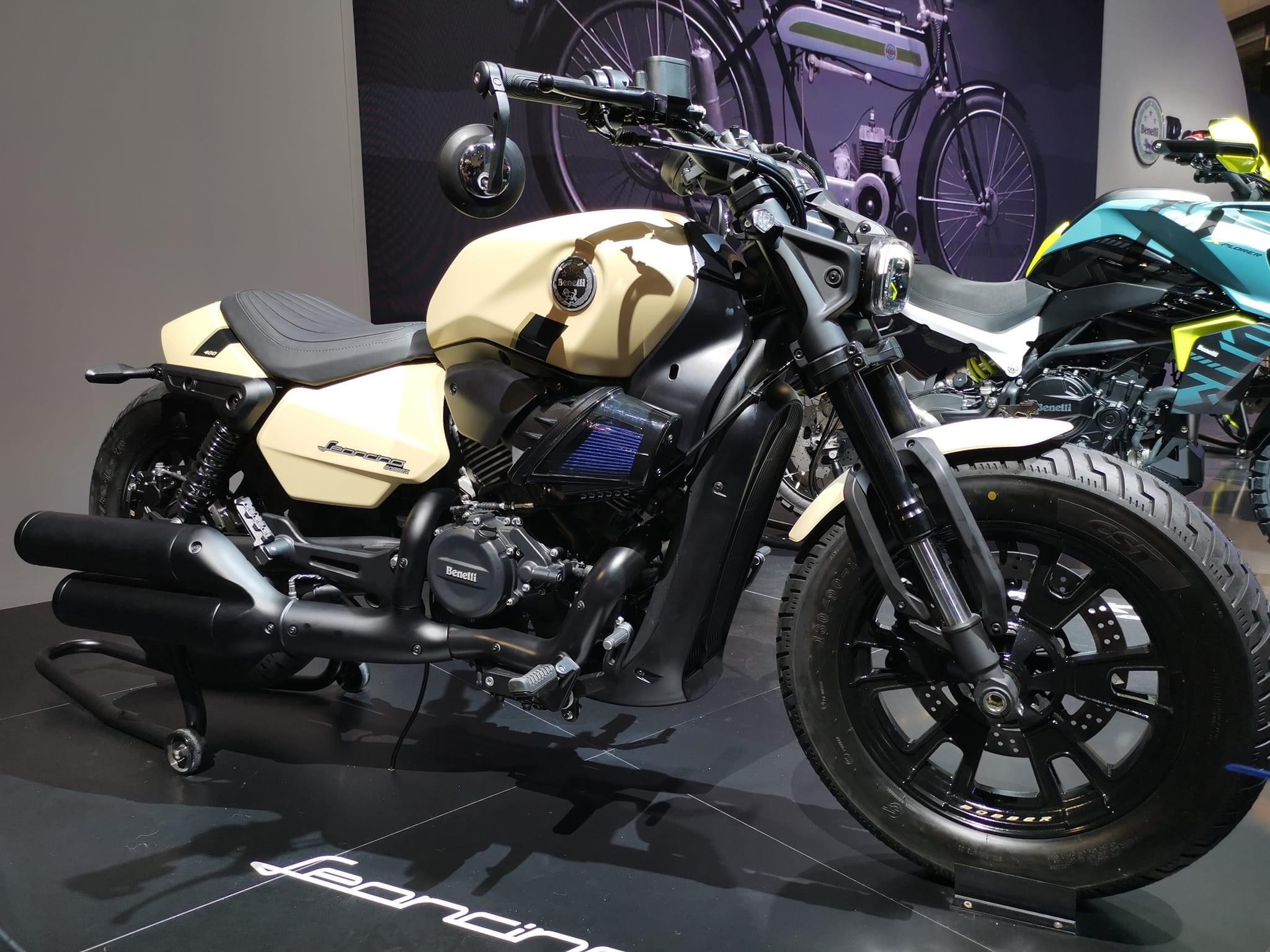
Benelli Leoncino Bobber 400

- Leoncino 250
- Leoncino 500 Trail
- Leoncino 800
- Leoncino 800 Trail
- Leoncino Bobber 400

== The Benelli and MotoBi Museum ==
The Benelli and MotoBi museum is located in Pesaro, in Viale Mameli 22, right in the former workshops of the original factory, in use until the end of the 80s.

Of the original plant was "saved" only a building of just over a thousand square meters, the only example of industrial archeology of the city, which became the seat of the Officine Benelli Museum, managed by the Moto Club "Tonino Benelli" and the Benelli Historical Register (R.S.B.). The "survivor" building of the old Benelli factory, at the time used as a warehouse, was perfectly restored with the supervision of the Superintendence of Fine Arts in the 2000s. In its rooms there are about 200 Benelli, MotoBi and more motorcycles on permanent display and from spring 2021 you can admire the prestigious ASI-Morbidelli collection.

The itinerary begins in the room dedicated to Dr. Paolo Prosperi (1944–2020), co-founder and former president of the Historic Benelli Register. This section displays notable motorcycles from the century-long history of the Pesaro-based manufacturer. The collection also includes historical photographs of riders, technicians, and key figures associated with Benelli and MotoBi, alongside trophies and engines from Benelli, MotoBi, and Molaroni.

It continues in the large room dedicated to Ing. Giuseppe Benelli. Featured here are the first motorcycle that passed through Pesaro in 1897, a tricycle De Dion Bouton, and motorcycles with engines of all kinds. Also featured are two very rare Molaroni Brothers motorbike specimens of the 1920s, some Benelli motorbikes built before the Second World War, and a wide range of Motobi motorbikes from 1950 to 1970.

In the third hall two examples of Letizia, all types of the Leoncino model, the two cylinders two stroke, the four cylinders and six cylinders four stroke of the De Tomaso period, some models for the US market and a large series of high and low wheel mopeds.

Then the exhibition continues on a mezzanine floor of about 250 square meters. with scaffolding and wooden roof, where the ASI-Morbidelli Collection was placed it consists of 71 models from 30 brands from 9 countries, all models prior to the S.G.M. and two car models BBC (Version "Giardiniera" and Autotelaio with engine) produced by Giuseppe Benelli, finally, on an ideal "pit line", some rare examples of racing motorbikes built in the province of Pesaro and Urbino between the sixties and eighties: MotoBi, MBA, Morbidelli, Piovaticci and Sanvenero.

== Palmares ==
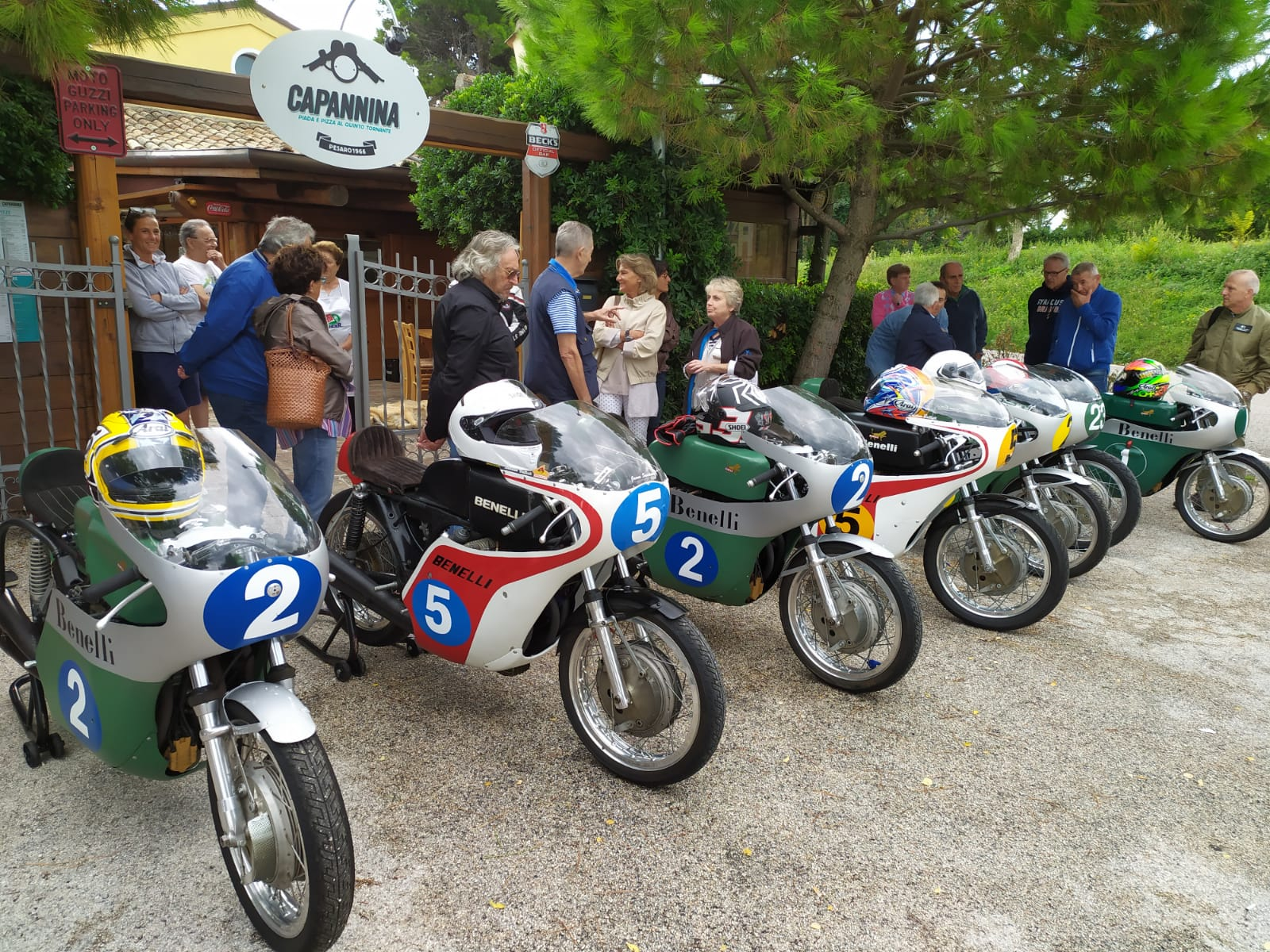
Benelli GP (250–350–500), Pesaro (2019)

Tonino Benelli, the younger of the six brothers, graduated as Italian Champion in 1927, 1928, 1930 and 1931, driving in the first three cases the Benelli 175 super sport mono albero and in 1931 the bialbero. With the latter bike in 1932 will also conquer the square of honor in the European Championship, behind his teammate Carlo Baschieri. The Benelli motorcycles without Tonino, which had to interrupt his brilliant career as a driver in 1932 due to a serious accident occurred in the circuit of Tigullio, continued to reap successes and came to win again the European Title FICM in 1934 of the class "175" with the Belgian centaur Yvan Goor; in 1935 the world speed record of category of the Mile and the Km launched with the milanese rider Raffaele Alberti riding the "250" bialbero sport with 182.500 km/h; in 1939 the Tourist Trophy with the English Ted Mellors always with a "250" bialbero sport.

After World War II, Benelli won two World Championships in the 250cc class: in 1950 with Dario Ambrosini, and in 1969 with Kelvin Carruthers. The company also won five Italian Speed Championships in the 250cc class: with Ambrosini (1950), Tarquinio Provini (1965, 1966), and Renzo Pasolini (1968, 1969). In the 350cc class, Benelli won three Italian Speed Championships: with Silvio Grassetti (1967) and Pasolini (1968, 1969). The company also achieved successful results in the Milan-Taranto and the Motogiro d'Italia races with the Leoncino 125, a model produced by Benelli in the 1950s and 1960s.

The Trofeo Pesaro Mobili, held at Villa Fastiggi in Pesaro, was attended by the greatest names in world motorcycling of the time as Giacomo Agostini, Mike Hailwood, Jarno Saarinen and Renzo Pasolini. In 1971 "Mike the Bike" riding an old Benelli "350" came second behind "Ago" driving the three-cylinder MV Agusta.

In the 1972 edition Jarno Saarinen riding the brand new Benelli motorbikes 4 cylinder "500" and "350" wins in both classes beating respectively Giacomo Agostini on MV Agusta and Renzo Pasolini on Aermacchi. The era of De Tomaso begins in promising way, but this will be the first and the last competition of its management. In fact the Italian-Argentine businessman, after the death in Zandvoort of the English pilot Piers Courage, driving a De Tomaso F1, did not want to know any more about racing. Benelli will only return to compete in the 2000s in WSBK with the "Tornado 900 tre", the creature wanted by Andrea Merloni.

=== Race models (1927–2002) ===
Model	Engine	Years	Notes	Image
Benelli 175 Super Sport monoalbero	172,08 cc Single, Four-stroke engine, SOHC, air-cooled	(1927)		Benelli Monza 4S Monoalbero 175cc, 1927.
Benelli 175 Super Sport bialbero	172,08 cc Single, Four-stroke engine, DOHC, air-cooled	(1931)		
Benelli 250 Bialbero Sport	cc Single, Four-stroke engine, DOHC, air-cooled	(1935)		
Benelli 250 Single DOHC Compressor		(1939)		
Benelli 250 4C Compressor		(1942)	The most prestigious model of the ASI-Morbidelli Collection: the 4-cylinder Benelli with volumetric compressor of 1942. Born for competitions, it will never compete for the outbreak of the Second World War. After the war, the regulations will prohibit supercharging. This is the only one existing in the world.	Benelli 250 4C Compressor
Benelli 250 Single GP DOHC	cc	(1948)		
Benelli 125 Leoncino Corsa	cc Single, Four-stroke engine,	(1955)		Benelli Leoncino Corsa 125 (1955)
Benelli 60 Single DOHC	cc	(1965)		
Benelli 250 4C	cc	(1962–1969)		Kel Carruthers, Benelli 250 4 cylinders Grand Prix
Benelli 350 4C	cc	(1967–1970)		Benelli 350 cylinders Grand Prix.
Benelli 500 4C	cc	(1970)		Jarno Saarinen, Benelli 500 4 cylinders Grand Prix, 100 CV (1970)
Benelli Tornado Tre 900 WSBK	cc	(2001–2002)		

=== European championship ===
Year	Champion	Motorcycle
1932	(Kingdom of Italy) Carlo Baschieri	Benelli 175 single cylinder (DOHC)
Year	Champion	Motorcycle
1934	(Belgium) Yvan Goor	Benelli 175 single cylinder (DOHC)

=== MotoGP World Championship ===
- 250 cc class; :

Year	Champion	Motorcycle
1950	(Italy) Dario Ambrosini	Benelli 250 single cylinder (DOHC)
Year	Champion	Motorcycle
1969	(Australia) Kel Carruthers	Benelli 250 4 cylinders (DOHC)

=== MotoGP World Constructors championship ===
Year	Costructor	Class	Motorcycle
1950	(Italy) Benelli	250 cm^{3}	Benelli 250 single cylinder (DOHC)
1969	(Italy) Benelli	250 cm^{3}	Benelli 250 4 cylinder (DOHC)

=== Tourist Trophy Island Man ===
Year	Champion	Class	Motorcycle
1939 Isle of Man TT	(United Kingdom) Ted Mellors	Class 250 cc	Benelli 250 single cylinder (DOHC)
1950 Isle of Man TT	(Italy) Dario Ambrosini	Class 250 cc	Benelli 250 single cylinder (DOHC)
1969 Isle of Man TT	(Australia) Kel Carruthers	Class 250 cc	Benelli 250 4 cylinders (DOHC)

=== Italian Speed championship ===
Year	Champion	Class	Motorcycle
1927	(Kingdom of Italy) Antonio Benelli	175 cm^{3}	Benelli 175 single cylinder (SOHC)
1928	(Kingdom of Italy) Antonio Benelli	175 cm^{3}	Benelli 175 single cylinder (SOHC)
1930	(Kingdom of Italy) Antonio Benelli	175 cm^{3}	Benelli 175 single cylinder (SOHC)
1931	(Kingdom of Italy) Antonio Benelli	175 cm^{3}	Benelli 175 single cylinder (DOHC)
1932	(Kingdom of Italy) Carlo Baschieri	175 cm^{3}	Benelli 175 single cylinder (DOHC)
1934	(Kingdom of Italy) Amilcare Rossetti	175 cm^{3}	Benelli 175 single cylinder (DOHC)
1936	(Kingdom of Italy) Celeste Cavaciuti	250 cm^{3}	Benelli 250 single cylinder (DOHC)
1939	(Kingdom of Italy) Amilcare Rossetti	250 cm^{3}	Benelli 250 single cylinder (DOHC)
1950	(Italy) Dario Ambrosini	250 cm^{3}	Benelli 250 single cylinder (DOHC)
1965	(Italy) Tarquinio Provini	250 cm^{3}	Benelli 250 4 cylinders (DOHC)
1966	(Italy) Tarquinio Provini	250 cm^{3}	Benelli 250 4 cylinders (DOHC)
1967	(Italy) Silvio Grassetti	350 cm^{3}	Benelli 350 4 cylinders (DOHC)
1968	(Italy) Renzo Pasolini	250 cm^{3}	Benelli 250 4 cylinders (DOHC)
1968	(Italy) Renzo Pasolini	350 cm^{3}	Benelli 350 4 cylinders (DOHC)
1969	(Italy) Renzo Pasolini	250 cm^{3}	Benelli 250 4 cylinders (DOHC)
1969	(Italy) Renzo Pasolini	350 cm^{3}	Benelli 350 4 cylinders (DOHC)

== See also ==
- Motobi
- Benelli Armi
- List of Benelli motorcycles
- List of Italian companies § Motorcycle companies
- List of motorcycle manufacturers § .C2.A0Italy
