= Pol Demeuter =

Belgian motorcycle racer

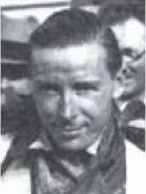
- Nationality: Belgian
- Born: May 9, 1904; Ganshoren, Belgium
- Died: July 2, 1934 (aged 30); Germany

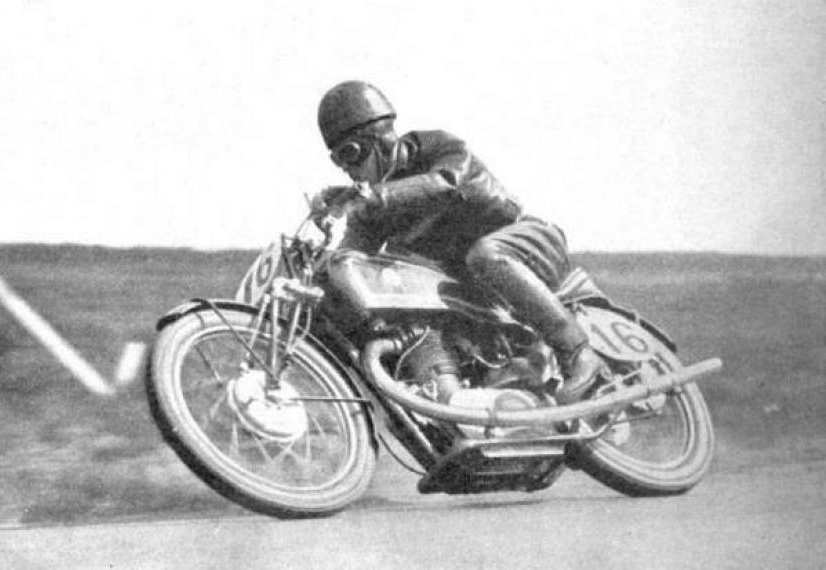
Pol Demeuter at the 1934 Dutch TT

Leopold "Pol" Demeuter (9 May 1904 – 2 July 1934) was a Belgian motorcycle racer.

== Career ==
Demeuter began his racing career in 1926. After initial success, he became professional and was hired by the motorcycle manufacturer Rush. In 1929, he became a factory-backed rider for the Saroléa company and had immediate success. At the beginning of 1930, he had a big accident which put him out of action for the rest of the year.

For the 1932 season, Demeuter moved to FN, but his first year with them was not very successful. In 1933, Demeuter achieved three victories on 500 cc motorcycles including the Circuit de Floreffe and the Grand Trophy de l'Entre-Sambre-et-Meuse in Mettet.

Demeuter started the 1934 season with four wins. In the 500 cc class he won races in Mettet and Floreffe, the Grand Prix des Frontières in Chimay and the Belgian Championship at Spa-Francorchamps. During the race at Spa-Francorchamps, he became the first rider to lap the track at an average of over 140 km/h on a motorcycle. Demeuter's fifth win of the season was the Dutch TT, which for 1934 carried the European Championship title and so Demeuter became European Champion in the 500 cc class. Demeuter won ahead of teammate and fellow Belgian, Erik Haps, who raced under the pseudonym, "Noir". Demeuter had lost the lead during the race due to a technical problem, but took it back in the final lap after "Noir" fell on an oil patch.

The following weekend, Demeuter entered the German Grand Prix, held at the circuit in Hohenstein-Ernstthal. During the race, Erik "Noir" Haps and Gunnar Kalén lost their lives in separate accidents. After learning about the death of their rider "Noir", the FN team decided to withdraw Demeuter from the race. Unfortunately, at the first attempt to stop him, Demeuter misunderstood the signal from his manager to stop his bike, and returned to the track. One lap later, before he could be reached again by his team, Demeuter lost control of his bike on oil (reported to be melted tarmac by other sources) and crashed at the final corner. His injuries were not believed to be serious and he was taken to a nearby hospital. It was discovered that he had severe leg injuries and necessitated the amputation of both legs. Demeuter's condition rapidly deteriorated and he died the following morning.

Sporting positions
Preceded by Gunnar Kalén	500 cc Motorcycle European Champion; 1934	Succeeded by Jimmie Guthrie
