= Eric Fernihough =

British motorcycle racer

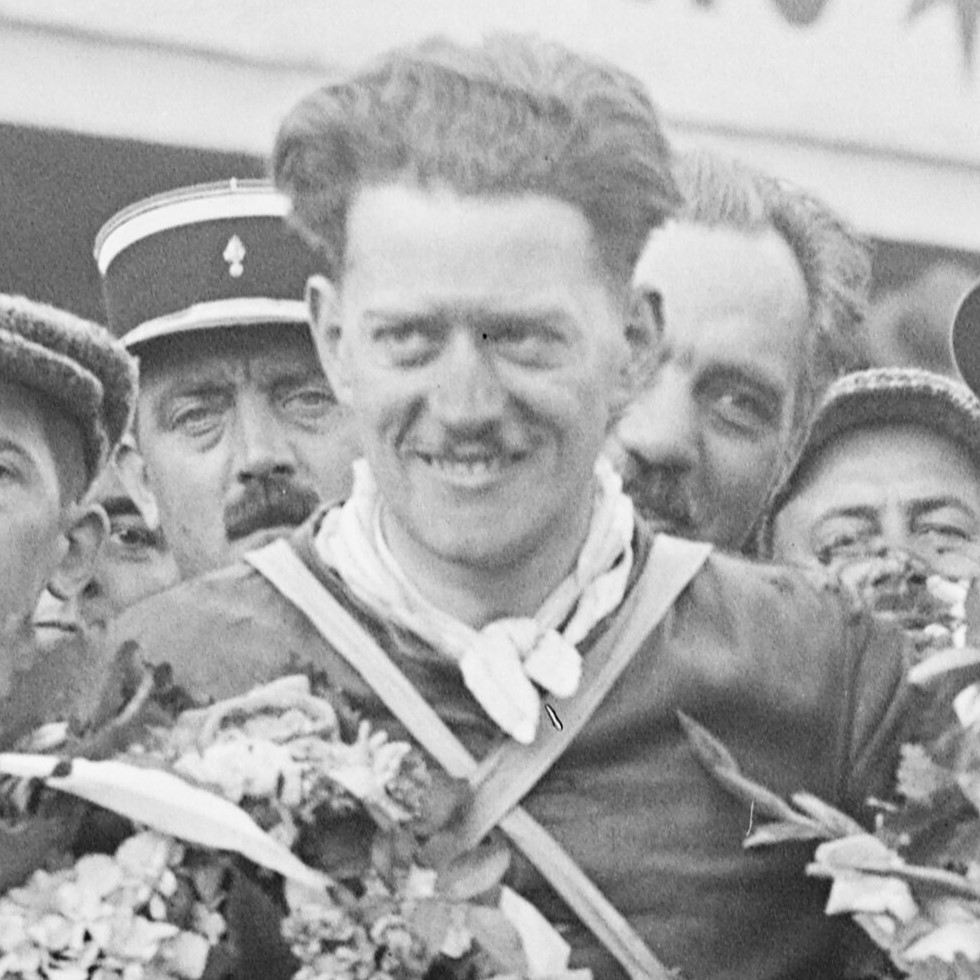
- Eric Fernihough during the U.M.F. Grand Prix in Reims in 1932
- Nationality: British
- Born: 17 February 1905; Liscard, England
- Died: 23 April 1938 (aged 33); Budapest, Hungary
Motorcycle racing career statistics
Isle of Man TT career
TTs contested	1 (1927)
TT wins	0
TT podiums	0

Eric Crudgington Fernihough (17 February 1905 – 23 April 1938) was a British motorcycle racer. He was born in Liscard, Cheshire, United Kingdom in 1905 as the ninth child of Jane and John Fernihough. Eric’s mother was at the time recorded working as a stewardess for the Cunard steamship line and It appears that all but Jane’s grown-up children were then in care. Of the father there is no trace at the time and Jane was to die giving birth to a daughter in December 1908.

Fernihough was chosen for adoption by Mrs Emily McCalmont at a Merseyside children’s home about 1910. He retained the Fernihough surname.

Fernihough spent two years from 1920 boarding at Clayesmore School then near Winchester and three years at Cambridge University studying chemistry, engineering and economics. He graduated BA in June 1926 and later acquired an MA.

At Cambridge, Fernihough took up motorcycle racing. From 1926 he had a successful motorcycle racing career on a variety of makes but mainly Excelsiors with JAP engines, initially at Brooklands Motor Course, in Ireland and on the Continent.

== Career ==
In the first half of the 1930s, Fernihough took part in many international races for the Excelsior Motor Company. In April 1930 he won the North West 200 race in Northern Ireland in the 175 cc category. In the Belgian Grand Prix of the same year, Fernihough finished second to the local rider Yvan Goor. In September 1930, he won the 175cc UMF Grand Prix in Pau, France.

In June 1931, Fernihough won his second UMF Grand Prix in the 175cc category and with it the title of European Champion. That year he also won the Belgian Grand Prix and the 250cc category races at the North West 200 and Swedish TT. l Late in 1931 he married Dorothy Penrose from Shirley in Hampshire, and took over the Tower Garage next to Brooklands Motor Course where he developed a tuning and motor engineering business.

In 1932, Fernihough won the 175cc races at the Dutch TT, the UMF Grand Prix and the Belgian Grand Prix. That year Fernihough recorded 18 firsts and 13 lap records. In 1933 he had 14 firsts and 17 records. In 1934 he had 16 firsts with 18 in 1935 and 10 in 1936.

In 1935, using a 996cc JAP-engined Brough Superior, Fernihough improved the Outer Circuit lap record at the Brooklands, one of the fastest tracks of the time, to 123.58 miles per hour (198.88 km/h).

In 1936, Fernihough set a new flying mile motorcycle speed record for solo motorcycles on his Brough Superior at a speed of 163.82 miles per hour (263.64 km/h). The following year, he improved on this speed, upping the flying kilometre record to 169.79 miles per hour (273.25 km/h). He also set a new record for sidecar motorcycles at 137.11 miles per hour (220.66 km/h).

=== Fatal accident ===
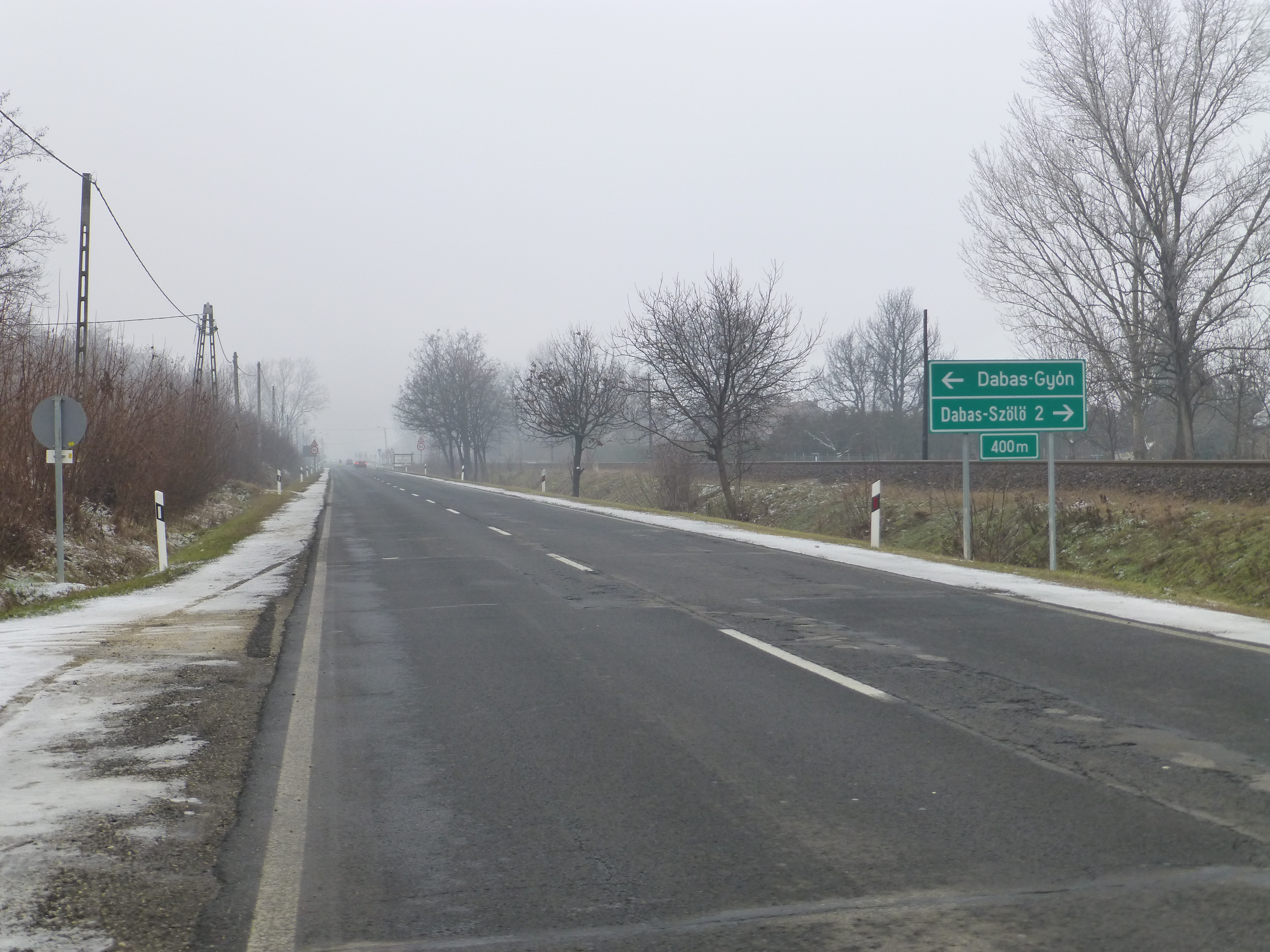
The place of Fernihough's death: Hungarian Route 5, km 45-46

On 23 April 1938, Fernihough crashed and was killed while attempting to break the world's absolute motorcycle speed record at Gyón, Hungary.

== Statistics ==
=== Title ===
- 1931 – 175 cc European Champion on an Excelsior

=== Race wins ===
(yellow background denotes that the race determined the European Championship)

Year	Class	Motorcycle	Race	Circuit
1930	175 cc	Excelsior	North West 200	
1930	175 cc	Excelsior	UMF Grand Prix	Pau
1931	175 cc	Excelsior	III. North West 200	
1931	175 cc	Excelsior	UMF Grand Prix	Montlhéry
1931	175 cc	Excelsior	Belgian Grand Prix	Spa-Francorchamps
1931	250 cc	Excelsior	Swedish TT	Onsala
1932	175 cc	Excelsior	North West 200	
1932	175 cc	Excelsior	Dutch TT	Circuit van Drenthe
1932	175 cc	Excelsior	UMF Grand Prix	Reims
1932	175 cc	Excelsior	Belgian Grand Prix	Spa-Francorchamps
1934	175 cc	Excelsior	UMF Grand Prix	Dieppe

Sporting positions
Preceded by Yvan Goor	175cc Motorcycle European Champion; 1931	Succeeded by Carlo Baschieri
