= Cecil Ashby =

British motorcycle racer

Cecil Thomas Ashby
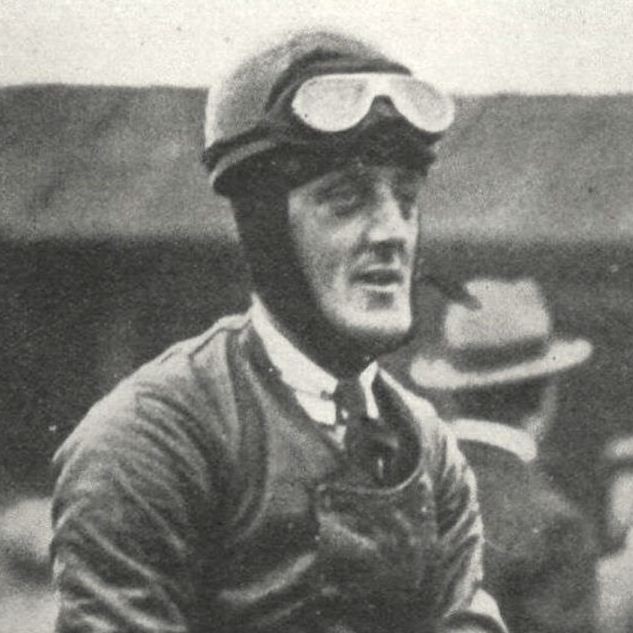
- Cecil Ashby in his racing gear (1924)
- Nationality: British
- Born: 1896; Stoke Newington,England
- Died: 10 June 1929 (aged 32–33); Douglas, Isle of Man

Cecil Thomas Ashby (1896 – 10 June 1929 in Douglas, Isle of Man) was a British motorcycle racer. He won the European motorcycle championship twice. Ashby died in an accident during the 1929 Isle of Man Junior Tourist Trophy races.
