= Jimmie Guthrie =

Scottish motorcycle racer

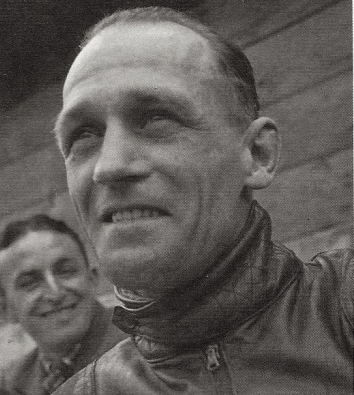
- Nationality: British
- Born: 23 May 1897; Hawick, Scotland
- Died: 8 August 1937 (aged 40); Sachsenring road racing course, near Hohenstein-Ernstthal village, Germany
Motorcycle racing career statistics
Grand Prix motorcycle racing
Active years	1927-1937
First race	1928 German Grand Prix 350 cc
Last race	1937 German Grand Prix 500 cc
First win	1930 German Grand Prix 350 cc
Last win	1937 Belgium Grand Prix 500 cc
Team(s)	AJS, Norton
Championships	4
Starts / Wins / Podiums / Poles / F. laps / Points; 0 / 19 / 0 / 0 / 0 / 0
Isle of Man TT career
TTs contested	12 (1923, 1927-1937)
TT wins	6
First TT win	1930 Lightweight TT
Last TT win	1937 Junior TT
TT podiums	12

James Guthrie (23 May 1897 – 8 August 1937) was a Scottish motorcycle racer.

A motorcycle garage proprietor and professional motorcycle racer from Hawick Roxburghshire, Guthrie was known as the “Flying Scotsman,” with a hard-charging motor-cycle racing style winning 14 European Continental Grand Prix in a three-year period 1934–1937 out of a total of 19 European Grand Prix victories .

While racing with the works Norton motorcycle team, Guthrie won the 500cc FICM 500cc European motor-cycle championship for three consecutive years 1934–1937 and the 350cc category in 1937. During the 1930s, Guthrie won the North West 200 races on three occasions and a further six wins at the Isle of Man TT races.

While leading on the last lap of the 1937 German Motorcycle Grand Prix, Guthrie crashed for reasons that are still not entirely clear, speculated to be an incident with another competitor, or a mechanical issue. He later died later in hospital from the injuries.

== Biography ==
Guthrie was born in Hawick, Scotland.

=== War service ===
After a period as an apprentice engineer, Guthrie joined the local regiment, the 4th (The Border) Battalion King's Own Scottish Borderers. The 4th Bn Kings Own Scottish Borders were part of the 52nd (Lowland) Division and while moving from Scotland to Gallipoli were involved in the Quintinshill rail crash near Gretna Green with the 1/7th Bn Royal Scots which resulted in the death of 210 officers and men from the 52nd Division. While serving with the 4th Bn Kings Own Scottish Borderers, Guthrie saw service at Gallipoli and in Palestine. The 52nd (Lowland Division) also served in France in 1918 during the Second Battles of the Somme and Arras. During this time on the Western Front in France, Guthrie served as motorcycle dispatch rider.

=== Hawick & District MCC ===
After war service and returning to his native Hawick, Guthrie and his brother Archie joined the local Hawick Motor-Cycle Club. After participating in many local hill-climb and grass-track races, the Hawick MCC nominated Guthrie to race at the Isle of Man TT races for the 1923 season. Between this race and his next appearance at the TT in 1927, he competed at the Scottish Speed Championships at St Andrews and won the 1926 and 1927 championships.

=== Isle of Man TT race career ===
The 1923 Isle of Man TT was the first race on the Snaefell Mountain Course for Guthrie competing in the Junior Race that produced a first-time win for Stanley Woods. It was an inauspicious beginning for Guthrie, starting the 1923 Junior Race at number 38 riding a Matchless motorcycle and retiring at Kirk Michael on lap 1 with valve problems.

Returning to the TT after an absence four years, the 1927 races held contrasting fortunes for Guthrie. Starting the Junior race with number 36 riding a New Hudson motorcycle, Guthrie retired on lap 5 at Ballacraine with a broken petrol pipe. This was followed by a fine second place, 8 minutes and 17 seconds behind the winner Alec Bennett riding for the works Norton team in the Senior race, again on a New Hudson at number 18, despite being delayed at the TT Grandstand on lap 2 to tighten a loose footrest. Guthrie finished the race in 4 hours, and 4 minutes at an average race speed of 66.02 mph.

After lying in sixth place during 1928 Junior TT race Guthrie was 2½ minutes behind the leader Alec Bennett. During a refuelling stop at the TT Grandstand on lap 3, as Guthrie prepared to pull out, the engine backfired and set a fire to a petrol overspill and caused the Norton motorcycle to catch fire which led to his retirement. During the 1928 Senior TT race, Guthrie retired at Kirk Michael on lap 1 with an engine problem and the race was won by Charlie Dodson riding a Sunbeam at an average race speed of 62.98 mph. For the 1929 races, Guthrie was a non-starter for both the Junior and Senior Races after suffering injuries from a crash at Greeba Bridge during practice.

Despite a retirement at Crosby on lap 6 of the 1930 Junior TT race, this was followed by winning his first TT race, the Lightweight, riding an AJS motorcycle at an average race speed of 64.71 mph. The Senior TT race was another retirement for Guthrie on lap 2 at the Creg-ny-Baa with an engine misfire.

=== Norton team 1931–37 ===
In 1930, Guthrie set a number of world speed records on a Norton International at the concrete bowl track in Montlhery, France, as well as the one-hour world record at a speed of 114.09 mph, he also broke the 50 km, 50-mile, 100 km and 100-mile records.

After his first Isle of Man TT win for the 1931 season, Guthrie joined the works Norton team run by the engineer Joe Craig. In the 1931 Junior and Senior TT races, Guthrie finished in second place to Tim Hunt in both races who completed the first Junior/Senior double win for the factory Norton team.

Despite hitting and killing a sheep during practice at Glen Duff, Guthrie went on to compete in the 1932 races. On lap 4 of the Junior TT race, Guthrie retired at the TT Grandstand after slipping off at nearby Governor's Bridge. The Senior TT race produced another second-place for Guthrie, and Stanley Woods went on to win race at an average race speed of 78.47 mph, completing his first Junior/Senior double win.

After hitting the bank at Hillberry Corner on lap 1 of the 1933 Junior TT race, Guthrie lost valuable time. After recovering from this delay, he was up to second place, then slipped off on melting tar at Quarter Bridge on lap 4, finishing in third place behind winner Stanley Woods and Tim Hunt. The 1933 Senior TT race produced another Junior/Senior double win for Stanley Woods and a 1–2–3–4 win for the works Norton team, with Guthrie finishing in fourth place from team-mates, Tim Hunt and Jimmie Simpson.

After Tim Hunt had retired from racing following a 1933 Swedish Grand Prix crash, it was Irishman Stanley Woods who became the de facto Norton team-leader. However, after a dispute over prize-money, Stanley Woods left to join Moto Guzzi, promoting Guthrie to the vacant team-leader position. For the 1934 racing season Guthrie won the 500 cc 1934 North West 200 at an average race speed of 80.37 mph from Ernie Nott riding for Rudge and John "Crasher" White riding for Norton. The 1934 TT races also produced a Junior/Senior double win for Guthrie, winning the Junior race at an average race speed of 79.16 mph and the Senior race at an average race speed of 78.01 mph. In both races the second-place finisher was Jimmie Simpson, riding in his last TT event before retirement from racing.

The 1935 racing season started for Guthrie with another win in the 500 cc 1935 North West 200 at an average race speed of 76.53 mph from team-mate S. Darbishire and Henry Tyrell-Smith in third place riding for AJS motorcycles. The 1935 TT races were used by Associated Talking Pictures for the backdrop for the motion picture No Limit starring George Formby. The 1935 Junior TT race provided a Junior TT double win for Guthrie at an average race speed of 79.14 mph and Norton with a 1–2–3 race win with Walter Rusk and "Crasher" White filling second and third places.

=== 1935 Senior TT race ===
The 1935 Senior race was postponed until the next day due to poor weather. The race produced a dramatic competition. Guthrie led away at number 1 while Stanley Woods starting at number 30 had a 15-minute wait. By the last lap, Guthrie had built up a lead of 26 seconds. As the Moto Guzzi pit-attendants made preparations for Stanley Woods to refuel on the last lap, the Norton pit-crew signalled to Guthrie to go easy the pace on the last lap. Stanley Woods, riding for Moto Guzzi, went straight through the TT Grandstand area without stopping on the last lap and set a new overall lap record of 26 minutes and 10 seconds at an average speed of 86.53 mph. Despite the Norton team telephoning the signal-station at Ramsey on the last lap to indicate to Guthrie to speed up the pace, Stanley Woods won the race by 4 seconds from Guthrie in 3 hours, 7 minutes and 10 seconds at an average speed of 84.68 mph. After the race Guthrie said "I went as quick as I could but Stanley went quicker. I am sorry but I did the best I could."

=== Final result 1935 Senior TT (500 cc) ===
Saturday 22 June 1935 - 7 laps (264.11 miles) Mountain Course.

Rank	Rider	Team	Speed	Time
1	(Republic of Ireland) Stanley Woods	Moto Guzzi	84.68 mph	3.07.10.0
2	(Scotland) Jimmie Guthrie	Norton	84.65	3:07.14.0
3	(Northern Ireland) Walter Rusk	Norton	83.53	3:09.45.0

Following on from the dramatic win by Stanley Woods in the 1935 Senior race, the 1936 Junior race proved to be highly controversial marred by disqualification and protest. After leading for five laps, Guthrie was forced to stop at Cronk-ny-Mona to replace the drive-chain. Although continuing in second place, the lead passed to Norton team-mate Freddie Frith. At Parliament Square in Ramsey on the lap 6, Guthrie was 'black-flagged' for receiving outside assistance and disqualified. However, Guthrie denied the charge and continued to finish in fifth place in the race which was won by Freddie Frith to achieve his first TT win at an average race speed of 80.14 mph. The Norton race team protested the disqualification and Guthrie was posted in fifth place in the final race classification and was awarded second-place prize money. The 1936 Senior TT race was won by Guthrie by 18 seconds from Stanley Woods riding for Velocette and provided revenge for the dramatic defeat by Stanley Woods the previous year.

The 1937 TT races continued the "Norton Habit" for Guthrie winning the Junior TT race at an average race speed of 84.43 mph from fellow Norton team-mates Freddie Frith and John "Crasher" White in second and third places. The 1937 Senior TT race was won by Freddie Frith at an average race speed of 88.21 mph riding for Norton after winning the Junior race. On lap 5 of the Senior race, Guthrie retired on the Mountain Section of the course just below 'The Cutting.'

=== Memorials ===
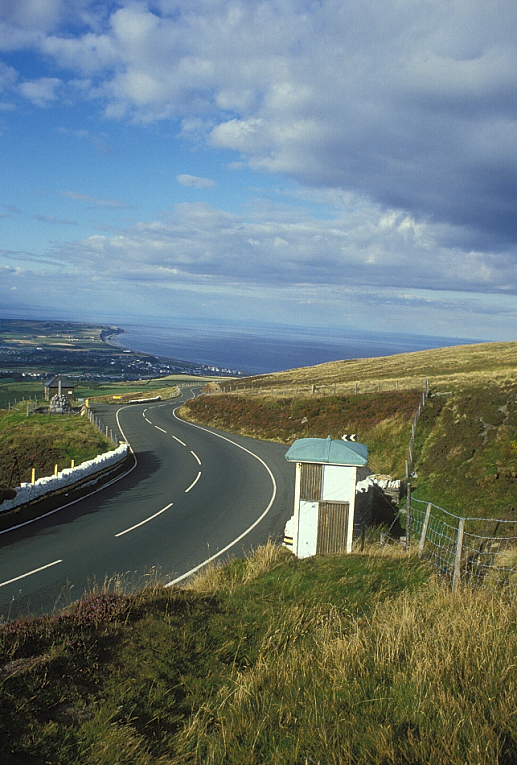
TT Race Marshal Signal Box on the A18 Mountain Road looking north towards Guthrie's Memorial and the Point of Ayre.

During the 1937 Isle of Man TT races he won the Junior TT but retired on lap 5 of the 1937 Senior TT race at The Cutting on the A18 Mountain Road section of the course. After his death in 1937 when competing in the 1937 German Grand Prix, a memorial funded by public subscriptions was erected on the TT course in 1939, at the place where he retired in his last race, previously known as The Cutting, called Guthrie's Memorial (Ordnance Survey Map SC 435 935 GB Grid) ever since. The inscription on the memorial reads as follows:

James Guthrie, 1897-1937. Erected to the memory of Jimmy Guthrie, of Hawick, a brilliant Motor Cycle Rider, famous on the Isle of Man Tourist Trophy Course for his wonderful riding and great sportsmanship. He won the race six times. Beat many world's records and was first in numerous foreign races. He died while upholding the honour of his country in the German Grand Prix, August, 1937.

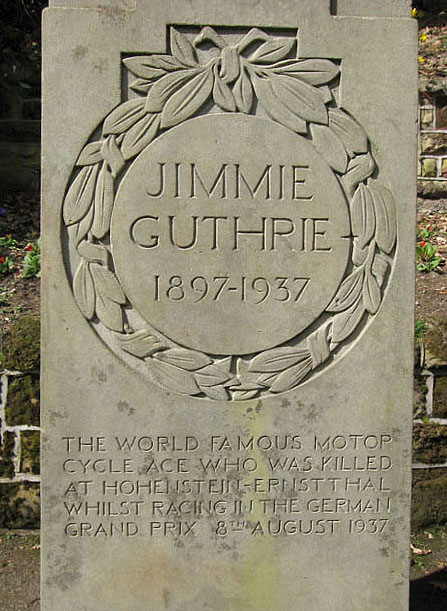
Memorial plaque in Wilton Lodge Park, Hawick, Scotland

A further memorial was created on the Hohenstein-Ernstthal or Sachsenring course in 1949 at the site of the fatal accident and is called the "Guthrie Stone."

There is also a memorial stone and bronze bust of Guthrie in his native town's park.

=== TT victories ===
Year	Race & capacity	Motorcycle	Average speed
1930	Lightweight 250cc	AJS	64.71 mph
1934	Junior 350cc	Norton	79.16 mph
1934	Senior 500cc	Norton	78.16 mph
1935	Junior 350cc	Norton	79.14 mph
1936	Senior 500cc	Norton	85.08 mph
1937	Junior 500cc	Norton	84.43 mph

=== TT career summary ===
Finishing position	1st	2nd	3rd	4th	5th	DNF
Number of times	6	5	1	1	1	10

== Sources ==
Sporting positions
Preceded by Pol Demeuter	500 cc Motorcycle European Champion; 1935-1937	Succeeded by Georg Meier
Preceded by Freddie Frith	350 cc Motorcycle European Champion; 1937	Succeeded by Ted Mellors
