= Yvan Goor =

Belgian motorcycle racer

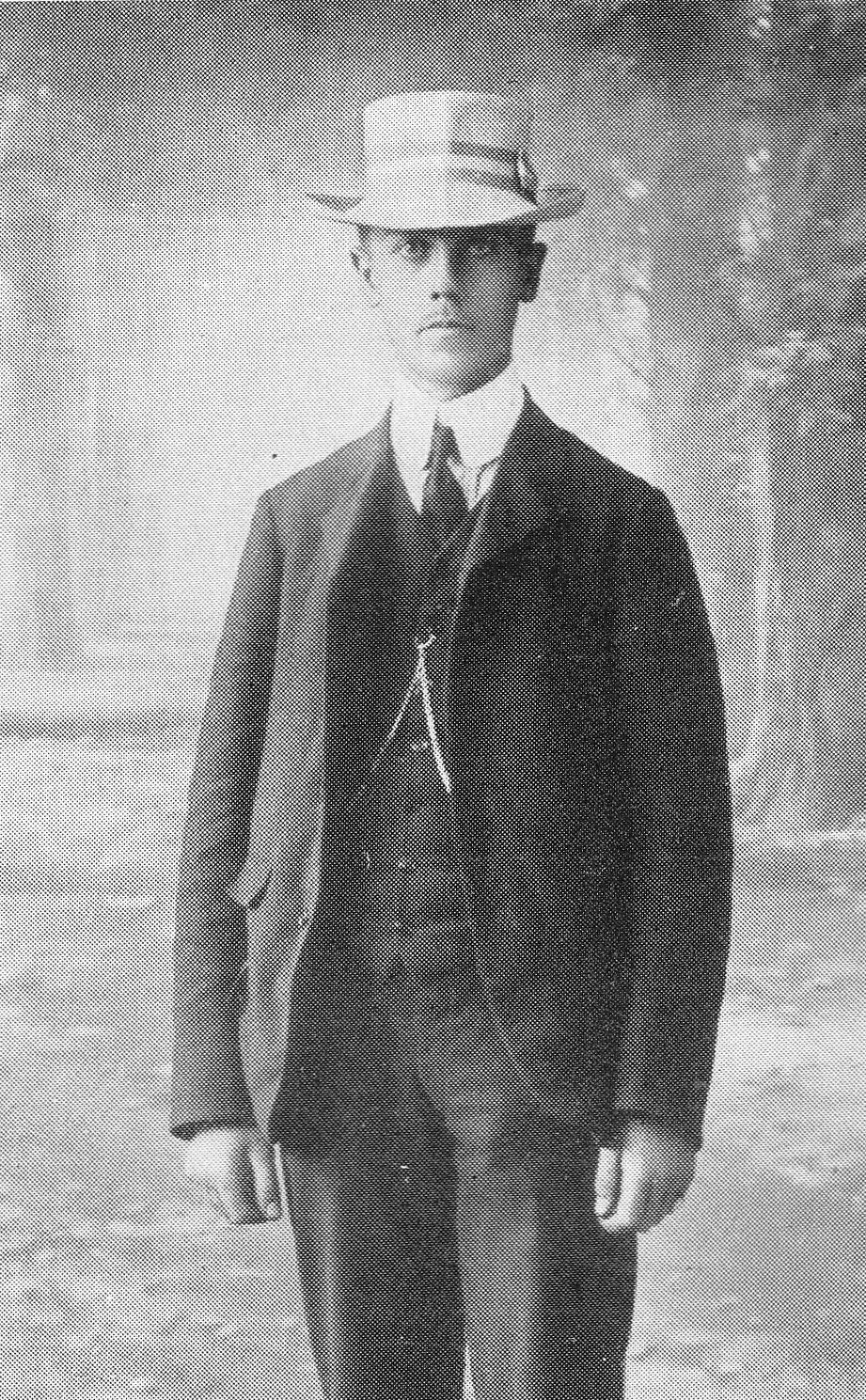
- Yvan Goor in 1906.
- Nationality: Belgian
- Born: 30 November 1884; Verviers, Belgium
- Died: 20 March 1958 (aged 73); Liège, Belgium

Yvan Goor (30 November 1884 – 20 March 1958), sometimes written as Ivan Goor, was a Belgian cyclist and motorcyclist.

== Career ==
=== Cycling ===
Goor began cycling with the support of his father, who acted as his manager and coach. Goor focused on motor-paced racing and his father acted as his pacemaker. In 1906, whilst racing at Magdeburg, Goor's father fell heavily and was unable to compete for the rest of the season.

Twice, in 1910 and 1911, Goor was Belgian champion in motor-paced racing and in 1908, 1912 and 1914 he came second. In 1921, Goor ended his career as a professional cyclist as he was unable to compete at the same level as before the war. As a member of the "RC Pesant Club Liégois", he created a relief fund for cyclists.

=== Motorcycle racing ===
In 1924, at the age of 40, Goor took up motorcycle racing. Twice he was European champion in the 175 cc category, in 1930 and 1934 whilst riding a DKW and Benelli respectively. In 1931, he came second in the European Championship to Eric Fernihough in the 175 cc category.

== Major wins ==
=== Cycling ===
- 1910 Belgian motor-paced racing champion
- 1911 Belgian motor-paced racing champion

=== Motorcycle racing ===
- 1930 – 175 cc European champion
- 1934 – 175 cc European champion

Sporting positions
Preceded by Josef Klein	175cc Motorcycle European Champion; 1930	Succeeded by Eric Fernihough
Preceded by Carlo Baschieri (1932)	175cc Motorcycle European Champion; 1934	Succeeded by None
