= Benedicto Caldarella =

Argentine motorcycle racer

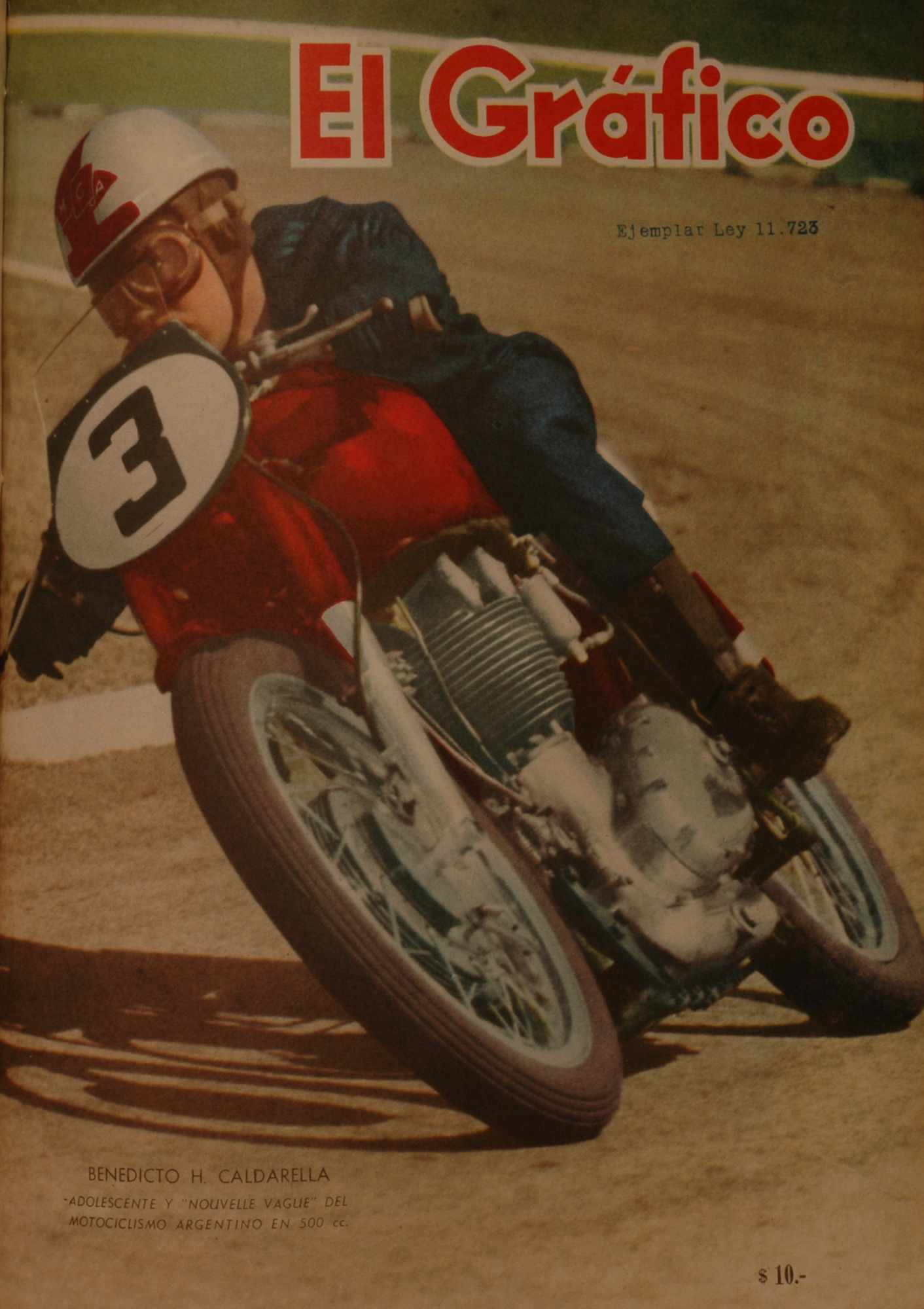
- Benedicto H. Caldarella - El Gráfico 2130
- Nationality: Argentine
Motorcycle racing career statistics
Grand Prix motorcycle racing
Active years	1961 - 1964
First race	1961 250cc Argentine Grand Prix
Last race	1964 500cc Nations Grand Prix
First win	1962 500cc Argentine Grand Prix
Last win	1962 500cc Argentine Grand Prix
Starts / Wins / Podiums / Poles / F. laps / Points; 5 / 1 / 4 / 0 / 2 / 22

Benedicto Caldarella (Buenos Aires, September 1, 1940), also known as Chiche Caldarella, is an Argentine former Grand Prix motorcycle road racer, who competed between 1961 and 1964. In 1962, he won at the 500cc Argentine Grand Prix, becoming the second Argentine rider in history (after Jorge Kissling) to win a Grand Prix in World Motorcycle Racing. He ended the season ranked fifth overall. In 1970, he ran a Brabham BT 30 in the European Formula 2 Championship, sponsored by Automovil Club Argentino, beside Carlos Reutemann.

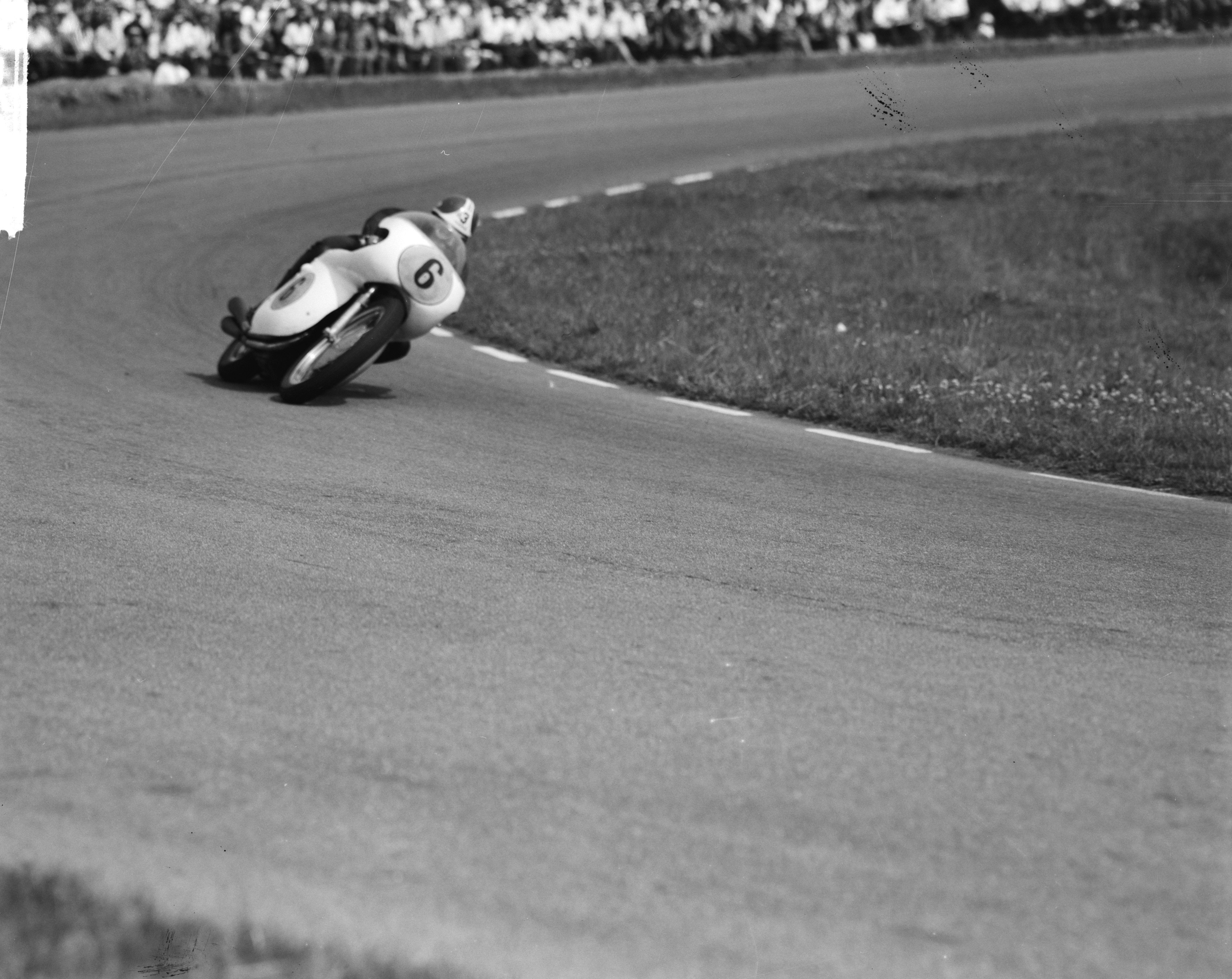
Caldarella in action during the 1964 500cc Dutch TT.

== Biography ==
Benedicto Caldarella was the son of an Italian father and an Argentine mother. His father and his sister came from the island of Sicily during the First World War, from the area at the foot of Mount Etna. He and his brother Aldo were influenced by their father Salvador's passion for motorcycles. Benedicto debuted and won at the age of 15 with a Gilera 150 cc. In 1959, he finished runner-up in Argentina and, a year later, he was crowned national champion with nine wins out of twelve races. That same year, having won the 100 Miles of Valparaíso, he was runner-up in the South American Championship.

Caldarella had his World Cup opportunity in the 1961 250cc Argentine Grand Prix. Almost no privateer drivers from the World Championship were able to attend this race, as travel to South America was too expensive. The factory teams were also absent, with the exception of Honda, which sent a delegation mainly to support Tom Phillis, who could still become world champion in the 125cc class. Caldarella obtained a factory Honda RC162 for the 250cc race but had to retire.

In the 1962 season, Caldarella rode a Matchless G50 as a privateer at the 500cc Argentine Grand Prix. The two European riders that participated (Arthur Wheeler and Bert Schneider) retired, leaving the South Americans alone in the fight for victory. Benedicto Caldarella won this Grand Prix. In the 1963 he finished third at his home Grand Prix. Also that year, he won the Argentine 500cc championship for a second time.

In 1964, Caldarella received a four-cylinder Gilera 500 from the factory. That was actually a 1957 machine, which was revived in 1963 when Geoff Duke founded "Scuderia Duke". That team raced these old machines, which were still fast but not very reliable. When Scuderia Duke folded, Caldarella acquired one of these machines, which he also used in European races. At the 1964 United States Grand Prix, he impressed by following Mike Hailwood for a long time until its gearbox broke, while at the Nations Grand Prix in Italy he did the fastest lap at Monza and finished second behind Hailwood.

After finishing his motorcycling career, Caldarella ventured into motorsports. He raced Formula 2 in Europe from 1967 to 1971, teaming up with Carlos Reutemann and a Brabham sponsored by Automóvil Club Argentino.

== Motorcycle Grand Prix results ==
Position	1	2	3	4	5	6
Points	8	6	4	3	2	1

(key) (Races in italics indicate fastest lap)

Year	Class	Team	1	2	3	4	5	6	7	8	9	10	11	Points	Rank	Wins
1961	250cc	Honda	ESP -	GER -	FRA -	IOM -	NED -	BEL -	DDR -	ULS -	NAT -	SWE -	ARG; Ret	0	-	0
1962	500cc	Matchless	ESP -	FRA -	IOM -	NED -	BEL -	GER -	ULS -	DDR -	NAT -	FIN -	ARG; 1	8	5th	1
1963	500cc	Matchless			IOM	NED	BEL	ULS	DDR	FIN	NAT	ARG; 3		4	11th	0
1964	500cc	Gilera	USA; Ret			IOM -	NED; Ret	BEL; Ret	GER -	DDR -	ULS -	FIN -	NAT; 2	6	9th	0
