= List of Grand Prix motorcycle racers: I =

Name	Seasons	World Championships	MotoGP Wins	500cc Wins	350cc Wins	Moto2 Wins	250cc Wins	Moto3 Wins	125cc Wins	80cc Wins	50cc Wins	MotoE Wins
(Italy) Andrea Iannone	2005-2019, 2024	0	1	0	0	8	0	0	4	0	0	0
(Japan) Tomoko Igata	1992-1995	0	0	0	0	0	0	0	0	0	0	0
(New Zealand) Dennis Ireland	1978-1979, 1983	0	0	1	0	0	0	0	0	0	0	0
(Japan) Fumio Ito	1960-1961, 1963	0	0	0	0	0	1	0	0	0	0	0
(Japan) Shinichi Ito	1988-1996, 1999, 2002, 2005, 2007, 2011	0	0	0	0	0	0	0	0	0	0	0
(United Kingdom) Bill Ivy	1962-1963, 1965-1969	1 125cc - 1967	0	0	0	0	7	0	14	0	0	0
