= 1963 Grand Prix motorcycle racing season =

Sports season

1963 F.I.M. Grand Prix motorcycle racing season

Seasons
- ← 1962 1964 →

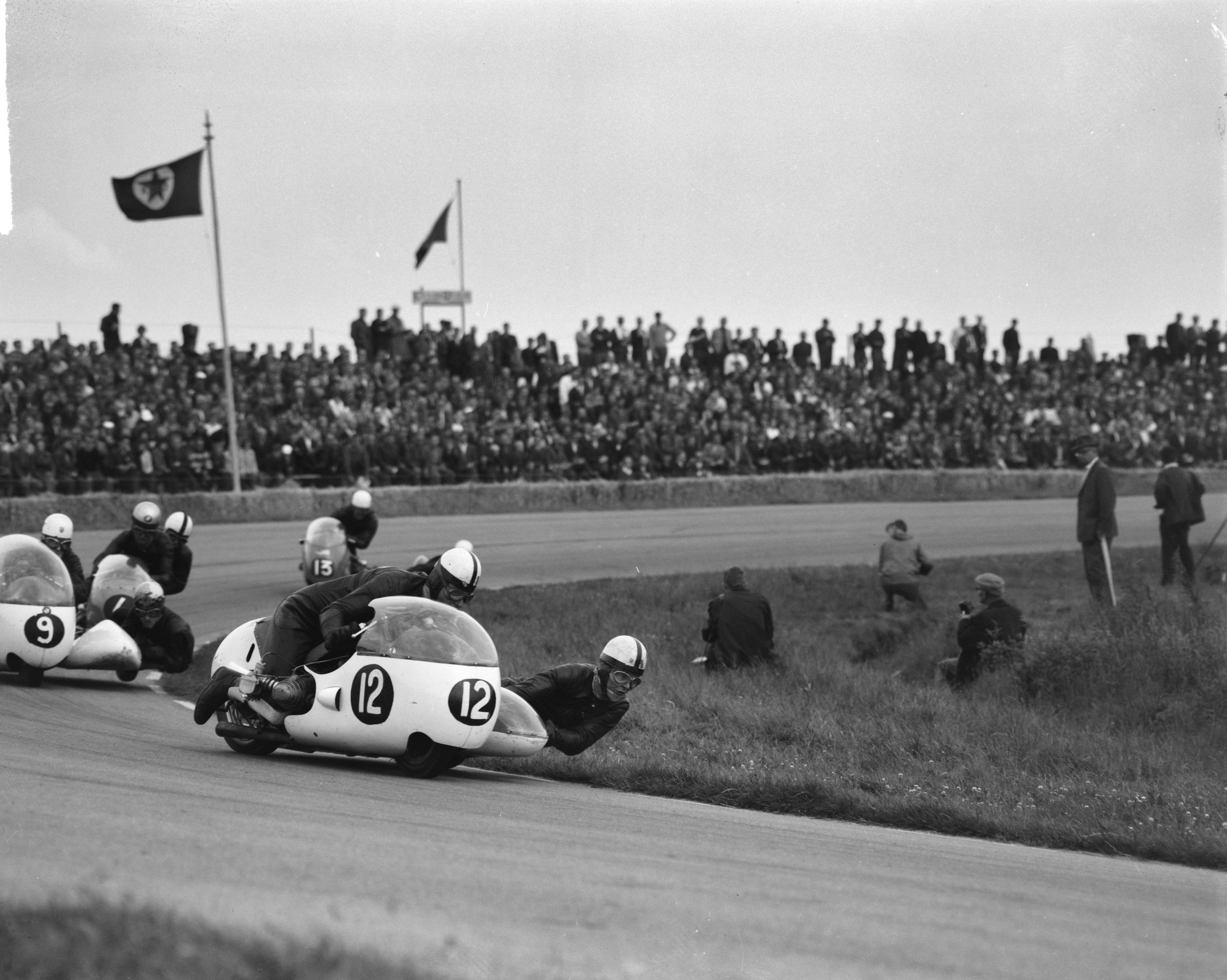
1963 Grand Prix motorcycle racing season

The 1963 Grand Prix motorcycle racing season was the 15th F.I.M. Road Racing World Championship Grand Prix season. The season consisted of twelve Grand Prix races in six classes: 500cc, 350cc, 250cc, 125cc, 50cc and Sidecars 500cc. It began on 5 May, with Spanish Grand Prix and ended with Japanese Grand Prix on 10 November.

== 1963 Grand Prix season calendar ==
Round	Date	Grand Prix	Circuit	50cc winner	125cc winner	250cc winner	350cc winner	500cc winner	Sidecars 500cc winner	Report
1	6 May	(Spain) Spanish Grand Prix	Montjuïc Circuit	(West Germany) Hans-Georg Anscheidt	(Switzerland) Luigi Taveri	(Italy) Tarquinio Provini			(West Germany) Deubel / Hörner	Report
2	26 May	(West Germany) West German Grand Prix	Hockenheimring	(New Zealand) Hugh Anderson	(West Germany) Ernst Degner	(Italy) Tarquinio Provini	(Federation of Rhodesia and Nyasaland) Jim Redman		(Switzerland) Camathias / Herzig	Report
3	2 June	(France) French Grand Prix	Circuit de Charade	(West Germany) Hans-Georg Anscheidt	(New Zealand) Hugh Anderson					Report
4	12 June	Isle of Man TT	Snaefell Mountain Course	(Japan) Mitsuo Itoh	(New Zealand) Hugh Anderson	(Federation of Rhodesia and Nyasaland) Jim Redman	(Federation of Rhodesia and Nyasaland) Jim Redman	(United Kingdom) Mike Hailwood	(Switzerland) Camathias / Herzig	Report
5	29 June	(Netherlands) Dutch TT	TT Circuit Assen	(West Germany) Ernst Degner	(New Zealand) Hugh Anderson	(Federation of Rhodesia and Nyasaland) Jim Redman	(Federation of Rhodesia and Nyasaland) Jim Redman	(United Kingdom) John Hartle	(West Germany) Deubel / Hörner	Report
6	7 July	(Belgium) Belgian Grand Prix	Circuit de Spa-Francorchamps	(Japan) Isao Morishita	(Austria) Bert Schneider	(Japan) Fumio Ito		(United Kingdom) Mike Hailwood	(Switzerland) (United Kingdom) Scheidegger / Robinson	Report
7	10 August	(Northern Ireland) Ulster Grand Prix	Dundrod Circuit		(New Zealand) Hugh Anderson	(Federation of Rhodesia and Nyasaland) Jim Redman	(Federation of Rhodesia and Nyasaland) Jim Redman	(United Kingdom) Mike Hailwood		Report
8	18 August	(East Germany) East German Grand Prix	Sachsenring		(New Zealand) Hugh Anderson	(United Kingdom) Mike Hailwood	(United Kingdom) Mike Hailwood	(United Kingdom) Mike Hailwood		Report
9	1 September	(Finland) Finnish Grand Prix	Pyynikki Circuit	(West Germany) Hans-Georg Anscheidt	(New Zealand) Hugh Anderson		(United Kingdom) Mike Hailwood	(United Kingdom) Mike Hailwood		Report
10	15 September	(Italy) Nations Grand Prix	Monza Circuit		(Switzerland) Luigi Taveri	(Italy) Tarquinio Provini	(Federation of Rhodesia and Nyasaland) Jim Redman	(United Kingdom) Mike Hailwood		Report
11	6 October	(Argentina) Argentine Grand Prix	Autódromo de Buenos Aires	(New Zealand) Hugh Anderson	(Federation of Rhodesia and Nyasaland) Jim Redman	(Italy) Tarquinio Provini		(United Kingdom) Mike Hailwood		Report
12	10 November	(Japan) Japanese Grand Prix	Suzuka Circuit	(Switzerland) Luigi Taveri	(United Kingdom) Frank Perris	(Federation of Rhodesia and Nyasaland) Jim Redman	(Federation of Rhodesia and Nyasaland) Jim Redman †			Report

† Non-championship race.

== Standings ==
=== Scoring system ===
Points were awarded to the top six finishers in each race. Only the best of five races were counted in 50cc, 350cc and 500cc championships, best of seven in 125cc and best of six in 250cc championships, while in the Sidecars, only the best of four races were counted.

Position	1st	2nd	3rd	4th	5th	6th
Points	8	6	4	3	2	1

==== 500cc final standings ====
Pos	Rider	Machine	MAN (United Kingdom)	HOL (Netherlands)	BEL (Belgium)	ULS (Ulster)	DDR (East Germany)	FIN (Finland)	NAC (Italy)	ARG (Argentina)	Pts
1	(United Kingdom) Mike Hailwood	MV Agusta	1	Ret	1	1	1	1	1	1	**40** (56)
2	(United Kingdom) Alan Shepherd	Matchless	Ret	3	3	4	3	2		Ret	**21**
3	(United Kingdom) John Hartle	Gilera	2	1		2	Ret	Ret			**20**
4	(United Kingdom) Phil Read	Gilera	3	2	2	Ret			Ret		**16**
5	(United Kingdom) Fred Stevens	Norton	6	5	4	7		4	3		**13**
6	(Canada) Mike Duff	Matchless	4			6	4	3			**11**
7	(United Kingdom) Derek Minter	Gilera				3	2		Ret		**10**
8	(Australia) Jack Findlay	Matchless	Ret	Ret	9	Ret	5		2		**8**
9	(Argentina) Jorge Kissling	Norton								2	**6**
10	(Australia) Jack Ahearn	Norton	9	4	5	Ret			Ret		**5**
11	(Argentina) Benedicto Caldarella	Matchless								3	**4**
12	(United Kingdom) Bill Smith	Matchless / Norton	8						4		**3**
13	(Argentina) Victorio Minguzzi	Matchless								4	**3**
14	(United Kingdom) Syd Mizen	Norton / Matchless	13	8	7	Ret		5			**2**
15	(Austria) Ladislaus Richter	Norton		Ret			Ret		5		**2**
16	(United Kingdom) Joe Dunphy	Norton	5			8					**2**
17	(Northern Ireland) Ralph Bryans	Norton				5					**2**
=	(Argentina) Fabián Villaverlran	Norton								5	**2**
19	(Soviet Union) Nikolai Sevostianov	CKB		12	Ret			6			**1**
20	(Sweden) Sven-Olof Gunnarsson	Norton	14	6	Ret			Ret			**1**
21	(Switzerland) Gyula Marsovszky	Matchless	Ret		6				Ret		**1**
22	(Uruguay) Horacio Costas	Norton								6	**1**
=	(United Kingdom) Vernon Cottle	Norton					6				**1**
=	(Italy) Vasco Loro	Norton							6		**1**
25	(Australia) Raymond Shaw	Matchless	32	10					7		**0**
26	(New Zealand) Morry Low	Matchless	12	7	Ret						**0**
27	(South Africa) Ian Burne	Norton	21		Ret		7				**0**
28	(Finland) Anssi Resko	Matchless					Ret	7			**0**
=	(South Africa) Paddy Driver	Matchless	7						Ret		**0**
30	(United Kingdom) Dan Shorey	Matchless		Ret	11		8		Ret		**0**
31	(United Kingdom) Roy Ingram	Norton			8	Ret	Ret				**0**
32	(Switzerland) Othmar Drixl	Norton							8		**0**
=	(Finland) Hannu Kuparinen	Norton						8			**0**
34	(Northern Ireland) Billy McCosh	Matchless	19			9					**0**
35	(Germany) Walter Scheimann	Norton	Ret	9	Ret						**0**
36	(Sweden) Bo Granath	Matchless	Ret					9			**0**
37	(Hungary) György Kurucz	Norton					9				**0**
=	(Italy) Alberto Picca	Gilera							9		**0**
39	(United Kingdom) Ellis Boyce	Norton	10			13					**0**
40	(United Kingdom) Roy Robinson	Norton			17		10				0
=	(United Kingdom) Derek Woodman	Matchless	17			10					0
42	(New Zealand) Ginger Molloy	Matchless			10						**0**
=	(Finland) Tauno Nurmi	Norton						10			0
=	(Italy) Renzo Rossi	Norton							10		0
45	(Northern Ireland) Dick Creith	Norton				11					**0**
=	(Germany) Karl Recktenwald	Norton		11							**0**
=	(United Kingdom) Brian Setchell	Norton	11								**0**
=	(Finland) Antero Ventoniemi	Norton						11			**0**
49	(Germany) Lothar John	Norton		Ret	12						**0**
50	(United Kingdom) Stuart Graham	Matchless				12					**0**
51	(Australia) Ron Robinson	Norton	33		13						**0**
52	(Republic of Ireland) John Somers	Norton		13							**0**
53	(United Kingdom) Alf Shaw	Norton	26			14					**0**
54	(Netherlands) Joop Vogelzang	Norton		Ret	14						**0**
55	(United Kingdom) Michael McStay	Norton	15								**0**
=	(Northern Ireland) Tommy Holmes	Matchless				15					**0**
57	(Germany) Ronald Föll	Matchless	16				Ret	Ret	Ret		**0**
58	(Northern Ireland) Patsy McGarrity	Matchless				16					**0**
=	(Estonian Soviet Socialist Republic) Jüri Randla	CKB			16						**0**
60	(Northern Ireland) Jimmy Jones	Norton				17					**0**
61	(Belgium) Raymond Bogaerdt	Norton			18						**0**
=	(United Kingdom) Louis Carr	Matchless	18								**0**
=	(Northern Ireland) Rollie Stallard	Norton				18					**0**
64	(Northern Ireland) John Brown	Norton				19					**0**
65	(United Kingdom) Derek Llee	Matchless	20								**0**
=	(Northern Ireland) John Meneely	Norton				20					**0**
67	(United Kingdom) Pete Bettison	Norton	22								**0**
68	(United Kingdom) Billie Nelson	Norton	23								**0**
69	(United Kingdom) Peter Evans	Norton	24								**0**
70	(United Kingdom) Martyn Hayward	Matchless	25								**0**
71	(United Kingdom) Brian Walmsley	Norton	27								**0**
72	(South Africa) Bernie Marrier	Norton	28								**0**
73	(United Kingdom) John Simmonds	Matchless	29								**0**
74	(United Kingdom) Bob Ritchie	Norton	30								**0**
75	(United Kingdom) Don Ellis	Matchless	31								**0**
76	(United Kingdom) Jimmy Morton	Matchless	34								**0**
77	(United Kingdom) Colin Cross	Norton	35								**0**
78	(United Kingdom) Tony Heaton	Norton	36								**0**
79	(New Zealand) Graham Dickson	Matchless	37								**0**
80	(United States) Stan Brassley	Norton	38								**0**
81	(United States) Robert Knott	Norton	39								**0**
82	(New Zealand) Bill Wetzel	Matchless	40								**0**
83	(United Kingdom) Albert Moule	Norton	41								**0**
-	(France) Philippe Canoui	Norton					Ret		Ret		**0**
-	(Australia) Dennis Fry	Norton	Ret	Ret							**0**
-	(Austria) Edy Lenz	Norton	Ret	Ret							**0**
-	(Czechoslovakia) František Šťastný	Jawa	Ret	Ret							**0**
-	(Finland) Veikko Sulasaari	Norton					Ret	Ret			**0**
-	(Switzerland) Ernst Weiss	Norton				Ret	Ret				**0**
-	(United Kingdom) Dennis Ainsworth	Matchless		Ret							**0**
-	(Sweden) Billy Andersson	Norton					Ret				**0**
-	(United Kingdom) Monty Buxton	Norton	Ret								**0**
-	(United Kingdom) Roly Capner	BSA	Ret								**0**
-	(United Kingdom) Brian Carr	Norton	Ret								**0**
-	(United Kingdom) Chris Conn	Norton				Ret					**0**
-	(Northern Ireland) John Courtney	Norton				Ret					**0**
-	(Italy) Giuseppe Dardanello	Norton							Ret		**0**
-	(Italy) Antonio de Simone	Rudge							Ret		**0**
-	(United Kingdom) Brian Dennis	BSA	Ret								**0**
-	(United Kingdom) Alan Dugdale	Matchless	Ret								**0**
-	(United Kingdom) Anthony Fisher	Norton	Ret								**0**
-	(United Kingdom) Jack Gow	Triton	Ret								**0**
-	(Canada) Don Haddow	Matchless	Ret								**0**
-	(Federation of Rhodesia and Nyasaland) Alan Harris	Velocette	Ret								**0**
-	(Estonian Soviet Socialist Republic) Endel Kiisa	CKB						Ret			**0**
-	(Finland) Pentti Lehtelä	Norton						Ret			**0**
-	(Federation of Rhodesia and Nyasaland) Colin Lyster	Norton					Ret				**0**
-	(Italy) Emanuele Maugliani	Gilera							Ret		**0**
-	(Italy) Pietro Mencaglia	Norton							Ret		**0**
-	(Belgium) Raphaël Orinel	Norton			Ret						**0**
-	(United Kingdom) Peter Preston	Norton	Ret								**0**
-	(Italy) Tarquinio Provini	Moto Morini								Ret	**0**
-	(Northern Ireland) George Purvis	Matchless				Ret					**0**
-	(United Kingdom) Johnnie Rae	Norton	Ret								**0**
-	(United Kingdom) Frank Reynolds	Norton	Ret								**0**
-	(United States) William Sharp	BSA			Ret						**0**
-	(United Kingdom) Jack Simpson	Matchless	Ret								**0**
-	(Denmark) Vagn Stevnhoved	Matchless			Ret						**0**
-	(Austria) Rudi Thalhammer	Norton		Ret							**0**
-	(Italy) Angelo Tenconi	Moto Guzzi							Ret		**0**
-	(Northern Ireland) Ray Turkington	Norton				Ret					**0**
-	(Italy) Remo Venturi	Bianchi							Ret		**0**
-	(United Kingdom) Tom Walker	Norton	Ret								**0**
-	(Italy) Benedetto Zambotti	Norton							Ret		**0**
Pos	Rider	Bike	MAN (United Kingdom)	HOL (Netherlands)	BEL (Belgium)	ULS (Ulster)	DDR (East Germany)	FIN (Finland)	NAC (Italy)	ARG (Argentina)	Pts

Colour	Result
Gold	Winner
Silver	Second place
Bronze	Third place
Green	Points classification
Blue	Non-points classification
Blue	Non-classified finish (NC)
Purple	Retired, not classified (Ret)
Red	Did not qualify (DNQ)
Red	Did not pre-qualify (DNPQ)
Black	Disqualified (DSQ)
White	Did not start (DNS)
White	Withdrew (WD)
White	Race cancelled (C)
Blank	Did not practice (DNP)
Blank	Did not arrive (DNA)
Blank	Excluded (EX)

**Bold** – Pole
Italics – Fastest Lap

=== 350cc Standings ===
Place	Rider	Number	Country	Machine	Points	Wins
1	(Federation of Rhodesia and Nyasaland) Jim Redman		Rhodesia	Honda	32	5
2	(United Kingdom) Mike Hailwood		United Kingdom	MV Agusta	28	2
3	(Switzerland) Luigi Taveri		Switzerland	Honda	16	0
4	(Czechoslovakia) František Šťastný		Czechoslovakia	Jawa	7	0
5	(Czechoslovakia) Gustav Havel		Czechoslovakia	Jawa	7	0
6	(Italy) Remo Venturi		Italy	Bianchi	6	0
=	(United Kingdom) John Hartle		United Kingdom	Gilera	6	0
=	(United Kingdom) Alan Shepherd		United Kingdom	MZ	6	0
9	(Soviet Union) Nicolaï Sevostianov		Soviet Union	CKEB C360	5	0
10	(Canada) Mike Duff		Canada	AJS	5	0
11	(United Kingdom) Phil Read		United Kingdom	Gilera	4	0
=	(Sweden) Sven-Olof Gunnarsson		Sweden	Norton	4	0
=	(United Kingdom) Tommy Robb		United Kingdom	Honda	4	0
14	(Australia) Jack Ahearn		Australia	Norton	4	0
15	(United Kingdom) Fred Stevens		United Kingdom	Norton	4	0
16	(United Kingdom) Sid Mizen		United Kingdom	AJS	3	0
=	(Czechoslovakia) Pavel Slavíček		Czechoslovakia	Jawa	3	0
18	(Italy) Gilberto Milani		Italy	Aermacchi	2	0
=	(United Kingdom) Dan Shorey		United Kingdom	AJS	2	0
20	(United Kingdom) Len Ireland		United Kingdom	Norton	1	0
=	(Finland) Veikko Sulasaari		Finland	Norton	1	0

=== 250cc Standings ===
Place	Rider	Number	Country	Machine	Points	Wins
1	(Federation of Rhodesia and Nyasaland) Jim Redman		Rhodesia	Honda	44	4
2	(Italy) Tarquinio Provini		Italy	Morini	42	4
3	(Japan) Fumio Ito		Japan	Yamaha	26	1
4	(United Kingdom) Tommy Robb		United Kingdom	Honda	20	0
5	(Switzerland) Luigi Taveri		Switzerland	Honda	13	0
6	(United Kingdom) Alan Shepherd		United Kingdom	MZ	11	0
7	(Japan) Yoshikazu Sunako		Japan	Yamaha	9	0
8	(United Kingdom) Mike Hailwood		United Kingdom	MZ	8	1
9	(Japan) Kunimitsu Takahashi		Japan	Honda	7	0
10	(United Kingdom) Bill Smith		United Kingdom	Honda	4	0
=	(Italy) Umberto Masetti		Italy	Moto Morini	4	0
=	(United Kingdom) Phil Read		United Kingdom	Yamaha	4	0
13	(Czechoslovakia) Stanislav Malina		Czechoslovakia	CZ	4	0
14	(Italy) Silvio Grassetti		Italy	Benelli	3	0
=	(Japan) Hiroshi Hasegawa		Japan	Yamaha	3	0
=	(Hungary) László Szabó		Hungary	MZ	3	0
=	(Argentina) Raúl Kissling		Argentina	NSU	3	0
18	(Australia) Jack Findlay		Australia	FB-Mondial	2	0
=	(Argentina) Ivan Schumann		Argentina	NSU	2	0
20	(Italy) Gilberto Milani		Italy	Aermacchi	1	0
=	(United Kingdom) John Kidson		United Kingdom	Moto Guzzi	1	0
=	(Netherlands) Cas Swart		Netherlands	Honda	1	0
=	(United Kingdom) Chris Anderson		United Kingdom	Aermacchi	1	0
=	(Uruguay) Carlos Marfetan		Uruguay	Parilla	1	0
=	(Japan) Isamu Kasuya		Japan	Honda	1	0

=== 125cc ===
==== Riders' standings ====
Pos.	Rider	Bike	ESP (Spain)	FRG (West Germany)	FRA (France)	MAN (Isle of Man)	NED (Netherlands)	BEL (Belgium)	ULS (Northern Ireland)	GDR (East Germany)	FIN (Finland)	NAT (Italy)	ARG (Argentina)	JPN (Japan)	Pts
1	(New Zealand) Hugh Anderson	Suzuki		2	1**^{F}**	1**^{F}**	1	2	1	1**^{F}**	1**^{F}**			5	54 (62)
2	(Switzerland) Luigi Taveri	Honda	1**^{F}**	4	3	4	3	3	3	4	2	1**^{F}**			38 (47)
3	(Federation of Rhodesia and Nyasaland) Jim Redman	Honda	2		2	6					5	2**^{F}**	1**^{F}**	2**^{F}**	35
4	(United Kingdom) Frank Perris	Suzuki			4	2	2		6					1	24
5	(Austria) Bert Schneider	Suzuki				5	4**^{F}**	1	2**^{F}**	3					23
6	(West Germany) Ernst Degner	Suzuki		1**^{F}**	6	3		NC**^{F}**						3	17
7	(Japan) Kunimitsu Takahashi	Honda	3	5			5		5			3			14
8	(United Kingdom) Alan Shepherd	MZ		6						2	3				11
9	(United Kingdom) Tommy Robb	Honda			5		6	5	4					4	11
10	(Hungary) László Szabó	MZ		3							4				7
11	(Argentina) Héctor Pochettino	Bultaco											2		6
12	(Italy) Giuseppe Visenzi	Honda						4				4			6
13	(Argentina) Aldo Caldarella	Bultaco											3		4
14	(United Kingdom) Peter Inchley	EMC	4												3
14	(Argentina) Alberto Gómez	Zanella											4		3
16	(Canada) Mike Duff	Bultaco	6												3
16	(Canada) Mike Duff	MZ								5					3
17	(Spain) Francisco González	Bultaco	5												2
17	(Gibraltar) John Grace	Bultaco										5			2
17	(Argentina) Eduardo Salatino	Zanella											5		2
20	(France) Jean-Pierre Beltoise	Bultaco						6							1
20	(East Germany) Werner Musiol	MZ								6					1
20	(United Kingdom) Gary Dickinson	Honda									6				1
20	(Czechoslovakia) Stanislav Malina	ČZ										6			1
20	(Argentina) Horacio Maffia	Ducati											6		1
20	(Japan) Mitsuo Itoh	Suzuki												6	1
Pos.	Rider	Bike	ESP (Spain)	FRG (West Germany)	FRA (France)	MAN (Isle of Man)	NED (Netherlands)	BEL (Belgium)	ULS (Northern Ireland)	GDR (East Germany)	FIN (Finland)	NAT (Italy)	ARG (Argentina)	JPN (Japan)	Pts

Race key
Colour	Result
Gold	Winner
Silver	2nd place
Bronze	3rd place
Green	Points finish
Blue	Non-points finish
Blue	Non-classified finish (NC)
Purple	Retired (Ret)
Red	Did not qualify (DNQ)
Black	Disqualified (DSQ)
White	Did not start (DNS)
White	Withdrew (WD)
White	Race cancelled (C)
Blank	Did not practice (DNP)
Blank	Excluded (EX)
Blank	Did not arrive (DNA)
Blank	Did not enter (empty cell)
Annotation	Meaning
P	Pole position
F	Fastest lap
Rider key
Colour	Meaning
Light blue	Rookie rider

==== Constructors' standings ====
Each constructor is awarded the same number of points as their best placed rider in each race.

Pos.	Constructor	ESP (Spain)	FRG (West Germany)	FRA (France)	MAN (Isle of Man)	NED (Netherlands)	BEL (Belgium)	ULS (Northern Ireland)	GDR (East Germany)	FIN (Finland)	NAT (Italy)	ARG (Argentina)	JPN (Japan)	Pts
1	(Japan) Suzuki		1	1	1	1	1	1	1	1			1	56 (72)
2	(Japan) Honda	1	4	2	4	3	3	3	4	2	1	1	2	46 (63)
3	(East Germany) MZ		3						2	3				14
4	(Spain) Bultaco	5					6				5	2		11
5	(United Kingdom) EMC	4												3
5	(Argentina) Zanella											4		3
7	(Czechoslovakia) ČZ										6			1
7	(Italy) Ducati											6		1
Pos.	Constructor	ESP (Spain)	FRG (West Germany)	FRA (France)	MAN (Isle of Man)	NED (Netherlands)	BEL (Belgium)	ULS (Northern Ireland)	GDR (East Germany)	FIN (Finland)	NAT (Italy)	ARG (Argentina)	JPN (Japan)	Pts

=== 50cc Standings ===
Place	Rider	Number	Country	Machine	Points	Wins
1	(New Zealand) Hugh Anderson		New Zealand	Suzuki	34	2
2	(West Germany) Hans-Georg Anscheidt		West Germany	Kreidler	32	3
3	(West Germany) Ernst Degner		West Germany	Suzuki	30	1
4	(Japan) Isao Morishita		Japan	Suzuki	23	1
5	(Japan) Mitsuo Itoh		Japan	Suzuki	20	1
6	(Japan) Michio Ichino		Japan	Suzuki	14	0
7	(Italy) Alberto Pagani		Italy	Kreidler	9	0
8	(Switzerland) Luigi Taveri		Switzerland	Honda	8	1
9	(Spain) José Busquets		Spain	Derbi	7	0
10	(Japan) Shunkishi Masuda		Japan	Suzuki	4	0
11	(Argentina) Raúl Kissling		Argentina	Kreidler	3	0
12	(France) Jean-Pierre Beltoise		France	Kreidler	3	0
13	(Argentina) Karaber Samardjian		Argentina	Suzuki	2	0
=	(Japan) Sadao Shimazaki		Japan	Honda	2	0
15	(Spain) Juan García		Spain	Ducson	1	0
=	(United Kingdom) Ian Plumridge		United Kingdom	Honda	1	0
=	(Finland) Matti Salonen		Finland	Prykija	1	0
=	(Uruguay) Gastón Biscia		Uruguay	Suzuki	1	0
