= Bert Schneider (disambiguation) =

Bert Schneider (1933–2011) was an American film and television producer.

Bert Schneider may also refer to:

- Bert Schneider (boxer) (1897–1986), Canadian boxer
- Bert Schneider (motorcyclist) (1937–2009), Austrian motorcyclist
