= Isao Morishita =

Japanese motorcycle racer

- Nationality: Japanese
- Born: December 17, 1937 (age 88)
Motorcycle racing career statistics
Grand Prix motorcycle racing
Active years	1962 - 1964, 1966 - 1967
First race	1962 50cc Nations Grand Prix
Last race	1967 125cc Japanese Grand Prix
First win	1963 50cc Belgian Grand Prix
Last win	1963 50cc Belgian Grand Prix
Team	Suzuki
Starts / Wins / Podiums / Poles / F. laps / Points; 18 / 1 / 6 / 0 / 1 / 57

Isao Morishita (森下 勲, Morishita Isao) is a former Grand Prix motorcycle road racer from Japan. He began his Grand Prix career in 1962. Morishita enjoyed his best seasons in 1963 and 1964 when he finished in fourth place in the 50cc world championships.
