= Hiroshi Hasegawa =

Japanese motorcycle racer (1934–2023)

- Nationality: Japanese
- Born: 25 January 1934; Japan
- Died: 12 December 2023 (aged 89)
Motorcycle racing career statistics
Grand Prix motorcycle racing
Active years	1963 – 1966
First race	1963 Isle of Man 250cc Lightweight TT
Last race	1966 250cc Japanese Grand Prix
First win	1966 250cc Japanese Grand Prix
Last win	1966 250cc Japanese Grand Prix
Team	Yamaha
Starts / Wins / Podiums / Poles / F. laps / Points; 4 / 1 / 2 / N/A / 1 / 17

Hiroshi Hasegawa (Shinjitai: 長谷川 弘, Hiroshi Hasegawa; 25 January 1934 – 12 December 2023) was a Japanese Grand Prix motorcycle road racer. Hasegawa began his Grand Prix career in 1963 with Yamaha. He had his best season in 1966 when he finished the season in tenth place in the 250cc world championship. Hasegawa won the Macau Grand Prix in 1967 and 1968. Hasegawa died on 12 December 2023, at the age of 89.

Sporting positions
Preceded by None	Macau Motorcycle Grand Prix Winner; 1967–1968	Succeeded by John MacDonald
