= 1963 Isle of Man TT =

Annual motorcycle racing event

The 1963 Isle of Man TT motorcycle races were contested in six categories over the Snaefell Mountain Course. The Senior TT was won by Mike Hailwood on an MV Agusta.

== 1963 Isle of Man Lightweight TT 125cc final standings ==
3 Laps (113.00 Miles) Mountain Course.

Place	Rider	Number	Machine	Speed	Time	Points
1	(New Zealand) Hugh Anderson		Suzuki	89.27 mph	1:16.05.0	8
2	(United Kingdom) Frank Perris		Suzuki	87.74 mph	1:17.25.0	6
3	(West Germany) Ernst Degner		Suzuki	87.61 mph	1:17.31.6	4
4	(Switzerland) Luigi Taveri		Honda	86.99 mph	1:18.05.0	3
5	(Austria) Bert Schneider		Suzuki	86.30 mph	1:18.42.8	2
6	(Federation of Rhodesia and Nyasaland) Jim Redman		Honda	86.26 mph	1:18.44.6	1

== 1963 Sidecar TT final standings ==
3 Laps (113.00 Miles) Mountain Course.

Place	Rider	Passenger	Number	Machine	Speed	Time	Points
1	(Switzerland) Florian Camathias	Alfred Herzig		BMW	88.38 mph	1:16.15.0	8
2	(Switzerland) Fritz Scheidegger	John Robinson		BMW	87.66 mph	1:17.29.2	6
3	(United Kingdom) Tony Baitup	Peter Birch		Triumph	86.52 mph	1:17.17.6	4
4	(West Germany) Otto Kolle	Dieter Hess		BMW	81.55 mph	1:23.17.6	3
5	(West Germany) Georg Auerbacher	Eduard Dein		BMW	82.56 mph	1:22.16.0	2
6	(United Kingdom) Colin Seeley	Willy Rawlings		Matchless	81.52 mph	1:23.19.8	1

== 1963 Isle of Man Lightweight TT 250cc final standings ==
6 Laps (226.38 Miles) Mountain Course.

Place	Rider	Number	Machine	Speed	Time	Points
1	(Federation of Rhodesia and Nyasaland) Jim Redman		Honda	94.85 mph	2:23.12.2	8
2	(Japan) Fumio Ito		Yamaha	94.55 mph	2:23.40.4	6
3	(United Kingdom) Bill Smith		Honda	91.12 mph	2:29.05.2	4
4	(Japan) Hiroshi Hasegawa		Yamaha	88.39 mph	2:33.41.4	3
5	(United Kingdom) Tommy Robb		Honda	82.75 mph	2:44.10.2	2
6	(United Kingdom) John Kidson		Moto Guzzi	82.74 mph	2:44.10.6	1

== 1963 Isle of Man Junior TT 350cc final standings ==
6 Laps (236.38 Miles) Mountain Course.

Place	Rider	Number	Machine	Speed	Time	Points
1	(Federation of Rhodesia and Nyasaland) Jim Redman		Honda	94.91 mph	2:23.08.2	8
2	(United Kingdom) John Hartle		Gilera	90.58 mph	2:29.58.2	6
3	(Czechoslovakia) František Šťastný		Jawa	89.76 mph	2:31.20.6	4
4	(United Kingdom) Syd Mizen		AJS	89.65 mph	2:31.31.8	3
5	(Australia) Jack Ahearn		Norton	89.35 mph	2:31.01.8	2
6	(Canada) Mike Duff		AJS	87.59 mph	2:35.05.4	1

== 1963 50cc Ultra-Lightweight TT final standings ==
3 Laps (113.00 Miles) Mountain Course.

Place	Rider	Number	Machine	Speed	Time	Points
1	(Japan) Mitsuo Itoh		Suzuki	78.81 mph	1:26.10.6	8
2	(New Zealand) Hugh Anderson		Suzuki	78.40 mph	1:26.37.4	6
3	(West Germany) Hans-Georg Anscheidt		Kreidler	78.33 mph	1:26.42.0	4
4	(Japan) Isao Morishita		Suzuki	77.82 mph	1:27.16.2	3
5	(Japan) Michio Ichino		Suzuki	76.20 mph	1:29.07.6	2
6	(United Kingdom) Ian Plumridge		Honda	64.82 mph	1:44.46.4	1

- Fastest Lap; Ernst Degner 28 minutes 37.2 seconds, 79.10 mph.

== 1963 Isle of Man Senior TT 500cc final standings ==
6 Laps (236.38 Miles) Mountain Course.

Place	Rider	Number	Machine	Speed	Time	Points
1	(United Kingdom) Mike Hailwood		MV Agusta	104.64 mph	2:09.48.8	8
2	(United Kingdom) John Hartle		Gilera	103.67 mph	2:11.01.8	6
3	(United Kingdom) Phil Read		Gilera	100.01 mph	2:15.42.2	4
4	(Canada) Mike Duff		Matchless	99.29 mph	2:16.48.8	3
5	(United Kingdom) Joe Dunphy		Norton	99.63 mph	2:20.09.0	2
6	(United Kingdom) Fred Stevens		Norton	96.99 mph	2:20.11.2	1
