= Fumio Ito =

Japanese motorcycle racer

- Nationality: Japanese
- Born: 10 October 1939
- Died: 10 March 1991 (aged 51)
Motorcycle racing career statistics
Grand Prix motorcycle racing
Active years	1960 - 1961, 1963
First race	1960 500cc French Grand Prix
Last race	1963 250cc Japanese Grand Prix
First win	1963 250cc Belgian Grand Prix
Last win	1963 250cc Belgian Grand Prix
Team	Yamaha
Starts / Wins / Podiums / Poles / F. laps / Points; 9 / 1 / 4 / 0 / 2 / 34

Fumio Ito (伊藤 史朗, Itō Fumio; 10 October 1939 – 10 March 1991) was a Japanese professional Grand Prix motorcycle road racer. Ito began his Grand Prix career in 1960, although he was a Factory Yamaha rider as far back as 1957 where the Yamaha YD-A & YD-B 250cc machines were so devastating in the Asama highlands race, where Yamaha took the first three places with Matsuko on a YD-A taking the honors. Ito himself could have easily won the race and had set the fastest lap, but his YD-A motorcycle seized and cost him the race. The machines were later modified for the 1958 Catalina GP in States with smaller fuel tanks taken from the YA 125 machines, high pipes and high footpegs. Ito was the Star rider of the team and the only Japanese rider alongside four local American riders. Ito finished sixth, even after an unscheduled pit stop for a fouled plug. He enjoyed his best season in 1963 when he won the 250cc Belgian Grand Prix and finished the season in third place in the 250cc world championship, behind Jim Redman and Tarquinio Provini.

== Motorcycle Grand Prix results ==
**Position**	1	2	3	4	5	6
**Points**	8	6	4	3	2	1

(key) (Races in bold indicate pole position; races in italics indicate fastest lap)

Year	Class	Team	1	2	3	4	5	6	7	8	9	10	11	Points	Rank	Wins
1960	500cc	BMW	FRA; 6	IOM -	NED; 10	BEL; 10	GER -	ULS -	NAT -					1	15th	0
1961	125cc	Yamaha	ESP -	GER -	FRA -	IOM; 11	NED -	BEL -	DDR -	ULS -	NAT -	SWE -	ARG -	0	-	0
1961	250cc	Yamaha	ESP -	GER -	FRA -	IOM; 6	NED; 6	BEL; 5	DDR -	ULS -	NAT -	SWE -	ARG; 4	7	9th	0
1963	250cc	Yamaha	ESP -	GER -	IOM; 2	NED; 2	BEL; 1	ULS -	DDR -	NAT -	ARG -	JPN; 2		26	3rd	1
