= Mitsuo Itoh =

Japanese motorcycle racer (1937–2019)

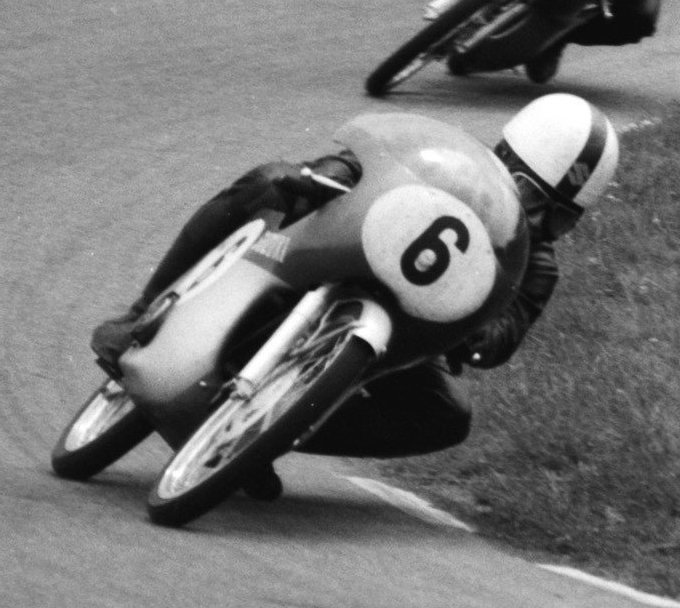
- Nationality: Japanese
Motorcycle racing career statistics
Grand Prix motorcycle racing
Active years	1961 - 1967
First race	1961 125cc French motorcycle Grand Prix
Last race	1967 50cc Japanese Grand Prix
First win	1963 Isle of Man 50cc Ultra-Lightweight TT
Last win	1967 50cc Japanese Grand Prix
Team	Suzuki
Starts / Wins / Podiums / Poles / F. laps / Points; 29 / 2 / 13 / 0 / 1 / 93

Mitsuo Itoh (伊藤光夫, Itō Mitsuo; 1 January 1937 – 3 July 2019) was a Grand Prix motorcycle road racer from Japan.

Itoh was a lifelong employee of Suzuki (mainly concerned with racing and competitions) and began his Grand Prix career in 1961 at the French motorcycle Grand Prix. There he was a DNS in the 125cc Grand Prix and retired on the third lap in the 250cc Grand Prix. He finished in fifth place in the 50cc world championships, four consecutive years between 1962 and 1965. In 1963, Itoh became the first Japanese rider with a Japanese motor-cycle (Suzuki) to win a race at the Isle of Man TT when he won the 50cc Ultra-Lightweight TT race. He remains the only Japanese rider to have won an Isle of Man TT race. Itoh won two Grand Prix races during his career. Itoh stayed with Suzuki for most of his racing career, even for his brief foray into car racing.

== In cars ==
Itoh competed in a Can-Am style Suzuki Fronte RF single-seater in the JAF Grand Prix Formula Junior "Junior Seven Challenge Cup" race, held at Fuji International Speedway in 1970. He won the race with an average speed of 130.9 km/h. While he was also supposed to have started in the JAF Grand Prix Tournament (also at Fuji) two weeks later, the Junior Seven Challenge Cup victory remained his only start in a JAF race. Itoh also famously partnered with Stirling Moss in December 1968 for a publicity high-speed run along Italy's 750 km (466 mi) Autostrada del Sole, which leads from Milan to Naples. In the end, the average speed attained was 122.44 km/h (76.08 mph), respectable for a car with a mere 356 cc engine.

== Motorcycle Grand Prix results ==
Position	1	2	3	4	5	6
Points	8	6	4	3	2	1

(key) (Races in italics indicate fastest lap)

Year	Class	Team	1	2	3	4	5	6	7	8	9	10	11	12	Points	Rank	Wins
1961	125cc	Suzuki	ESP -	GER -	FRA; NC	IOM; NC	NED -	BEL -	DDR -	ULS -	NAT -	SWE -	ARG -		0	-	0
1961	250cc	Suzuki	ESP -	GER -	FRA; NC	IOM; NC	NED -	BEL -	DDR -	ULS -	NAT -	SWE -	ARG -		0	-	0
1962	50cc	Suzuki	ESP -	FRA; 6	IOM; 5	NED; 5	BEL -	GER; 3		DDR; 2	NAT; 2	FIN -	ARG; 4		23	5th	0
1962	125cc	Suzuki	ESP -	FRA -	IOM -	NED -	BEL -	GER -	ULS -	DDR -	NAT -	FIN -	ARG; 3		4	13th	0
1963	50cc	Suzuki	ESP -	GER; 5	FRA -	IOM; 1	NED; 5	BEL; 5			FIN -		ARG -	JPN; 6	20	5th	1
1963	125cc	Suzuki	ESP -	GER -	FRA -	IOM -	NED -	BEL -	ULS -	DDR -	FIN -	NAT -	ARG -	JPN; 6	1	20th	0
1964	50cc	Suzuki	USA; 3	ESP; 3	FRA -	IOM; 5	NED; 3	BEL; 4	GER; 3			FIN -		JPN -	19	5th	0
1964	125cc	Suzuki	USA; 2	ESP -	FRA -	IOM -	NED -		GER -	DDR -	ULS -	FIN -	NAT -	JPN -	6	8th	0
1965	50cc	Suzuki	USA -	GER; 4	ESP -	FRA; 4	IOM; NC	NED; 4	BEL; 4	JPN; 3					16	5th	0
1966	50cc	Suzuki	ESP -	GER -	NED -					IOM; NC	NAT -	JPN; 4			3	6th	0
1966	125cc	Suzuki	ESP -	GER -	NED -	DDR -	CZE -	FIN -	ULS -	IOM -	NAT -	JPN; 3			4	9th	0
1967	50cc	Suzuki	ESP -	GER -	FRA -	IOM -	NED -	BEL -	JPN; 1						8	6th	1
