= EMC Motorcycles =

British motorcycle manufacturer

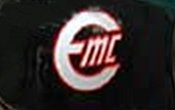
- Industry: Manufacturing and engineering
- Founded: 1946
- Defunct: 1977
- Fate: Wound up
- Headquarters: Isleworth, UK
- Key people: Dr Joseph Ehrlich
- Products: Motorcycles

EMC Motorcycles or the Ehrlich Motor Co was a British motorcycle manufacturer. Based in Isleworth, the business was founded by Joseph Ehrlich who emigrated to the United Kingdom from Austria in the 1930s.

A specialist engine tuner, Joe Ehrlich made unique two-stroke motorcycles. EMC stopped mass production in 1952 but Ehrlich used his knowledge of German technology to re-engineer the DKW Rennsport Ladepumpe production racers, which he developed as one-off EMC racing bikes and won several events over the next 25 years. The EMC 125 cc racer was considered among the fastest of its size in the early 1960s. Ehrlich left in 1967 and the company was wound up in 1977.

== History ==
Dr Joseph Ehrlich was a wealthy Austrian and keen motorcycle enthusiast who became the acknowledged authority on two-stroke single racing bikes. Ehrlich moved to the UK and set up EMC after the Second World War with a factory at Isleworth. Production focused on a 350 cc split-single motorcycle based on German engineering using two cylinders and pistons with a common combustion chamber. One cylinder housed the exhaust ports and the other the transfer ports. EMC also imported Puch 125 cc split-single, four-speed engines from Austria as there was nothing to compete in the UK market at the time.

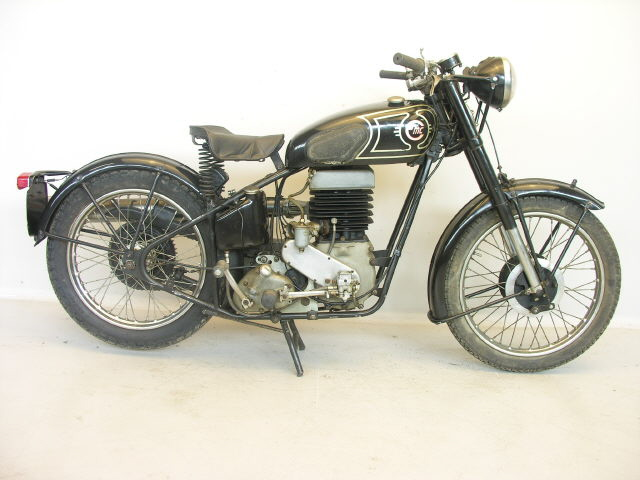
EMC Twin 1950

Dr Ehrlich worked throughout his life to improve engine performance. In 1948 he built a three-cylinder motorcycle engine that was banned from racing circuits as "too powerful". EMC racing motorcycles (and cars) were used by some of the leading riders, including Mike Hailwood who rode an EMC to fifth place in the 1962 125 cc world championship and won the 1962 Saar Grand Prix. From 1981, 250 cc EMC motorcycles won 4 Junior TTs at the Isle of Man and an EMC was the first 250 cc motorcycle to break the 110 miles per hour (180 km/h) lap record. Ehrlich went on to develop Formula 3 racing cars and although he retired from EMC in 1967 his interest in racing motorcycles continued and he produced one-off 250 cc Rotax-engined bikes in the 1980s and his last competitive motorcycle in 1995 – when he was in his 80s.

Ehrlich's experience with early two-stroke designs led to work on the 'Environmental Engine' that had variable compression and variable capacity to improve emission and fuel consumption. Potentially the future of engine technology, Josef Ehrlich died in September 2003 aged 89 without seeing his engine designs developed commercially.

== Models ==
Model	Year	Notes
EMC 350 cc	1948	Split single cylinder
EMC Model T	1953	Jap engine
EMC 125 cc	1963	Water-cooled twin

== See also ==
- List of motorcycles by type of engine
- List of motorcycles of the 1950s
