= Mike Hailwood =

British racing driver and motorcycle road racer (1940–1981)

Mike Hailwood MBE GM
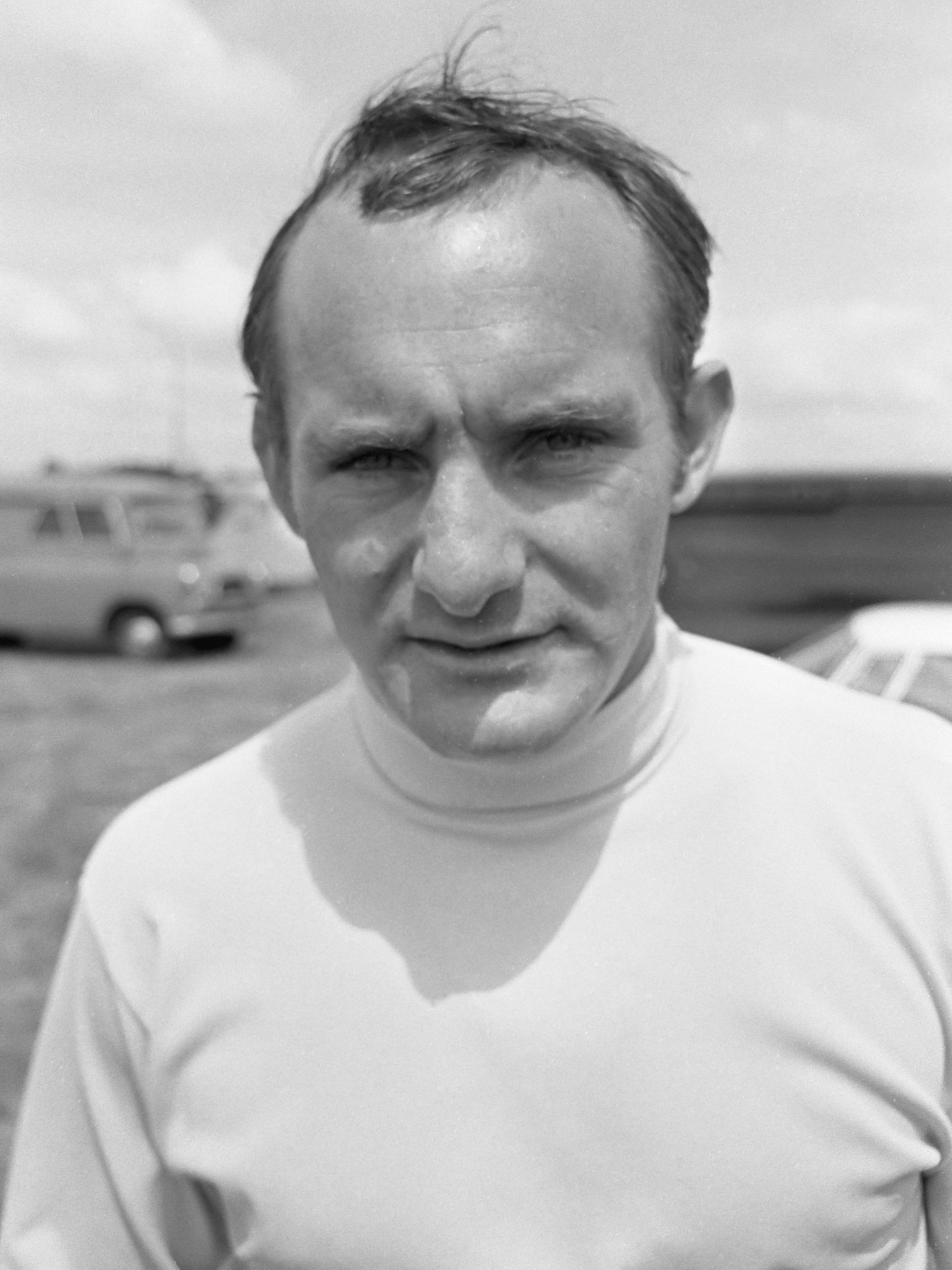
- Hailwood at the 1967 Dutch TT
- Born: Stanley Michael Bailey Hailwood; 2 April 1940; Great Milton, Oxfordshire, England
- Died: 23 March 1981 (aged 40); Birmingham, West Midlands, England
- Cause of death: Multiple vehicle road collision
- Spouse: Pauline Nash (m. 1975)
- Children: 2
Motorcycle racing career statistics
Grand Prix motorcycle racing
Active years	1958–1967
First race	1958 250cc Isle of Man TT
Last race	1967 350cc Japanese Grand Prix
First win	1959 125cc Ulster Grand Prix
Last win	1967 350cc Japanese Grand Prix
Team(s)	NSU, Honda, MV Agusta
Championships	250cc – 1961, 1966, 1967; 350cc – 1966, 1967; 500cc – 1962, 1963, 1964, 1965
Starts / Wins / Podiums / Poles / F. laps / Points; 152 / 76 / 112 / N/A / 79
Isle of Man TT career
TTs contested	12 (1958–1967, 1978–1979)
TT wins	14
First TT win	1961 Lightweight 125 TT
Last TT win	1979 Senior TT
TT podiums	19

Formula One World Championship career
- Nationality: (United Kingdom) British
- Active years: 1963–1965, 1971–1974
- Team(s): Parnell, Surtees, McLaren
- Entries: 50
- Championships: 0
- Wins: 0
- Podiums: 2
- Career points: 29
- Pole positions: 0
- Fastest laps: 1
- First entry: 1963 British Grand Prix
- Last entry: 1974 German Grand Prix

24 Hours of Le Mans career
- Years: 1969–1970, 1973–1974
- Teams: Ford, Gulf
- Best finish: 3rd (1969)
- Class wins: 0

Stanley Michael Bailey Hailwood (2 April 1940 – 23 March 1981) was a British racing driver and motorcycle road racer, who competed in Grand Prix motorcycle racing from 1958 to 1967, and Formula One between 1963 and 1974. (Note: The exact years Hailwood competed in Formula One: 1963–1965, 1971–1974.) Nicknamed "the Bike", (Note: Hailwood was known as the Bike for his natural riding ability on motorcycles with a range of engine capacities; he won World Championships across three classes.) Hailwood was a nine-time Grand Prix motorcycle World Champion, with four titles in the premier 500cc class with MV Agusta, and won 76 motorcycle Grands Prix across 10 seasons.

Hailwood's rivalry with Giacomo Agostini early in his career dominated Grand Prix motorcycle racing in the 1960s and culminated in their dramatic duel for the 1967 World Championship. Hailwood took 14 victories at the Isle of Man TT, and 5 victories at the Mallory Park Race of the Year.

After his motorcycle racing career concluded, he went on to compete in Formula One and other classes of car racing, becoming one of the few men to compete at Grand Prix level in both motorcycle and car racing. He returned to motorcycle racing at the age of 38, taking victory at the 1978 Isle of Man TT.

Hailwood died in 1981 following a road traffic collision in Warwickshire, England.

== Early life ==
Hailwood was born at Langsmeade House, Great Milton in Oxfordshire, the only son and elder child of Stanley William Bailey Hailwood, a millionaire businessman and managing director of a motorcar sales company as well as a successful motorcycle dealer who had raced motorcycles in the pre-World War II era. Hailwood had a comfortable upbringing; he learned to ride at a young age on a minibike as a small boy in a field near his home. He was educated at Purton Stoke Preparatory School, Kintbury, and Pangbourne Nautical College where he wore an RN cadet uniform, but left early and worked for a short time in the family business before his father sent him to work at Triumph motorcycles.

== Motorcycle racing career ==
Hailwood saw his first race at the age of ten with his father, and first spectated at the Isle of Man TT races in 1956.

Hailwood's first raced on 22 April 1957, at Oulton Park, finishing in 11th place. In 1958 he won ACU Stars at 125 cc, 250 cc, and 350 cc classes, earning him the Pinhard Prize, an accolade awarded yearly to a young motorcyclist under 21, who is adjudged to have made the most meritorious achievement in motorcycle sport during the preceding year. He teamed with Dan Shorey to win the Thruxton 500 endurance race and finished in four classes of TT race with one podium.

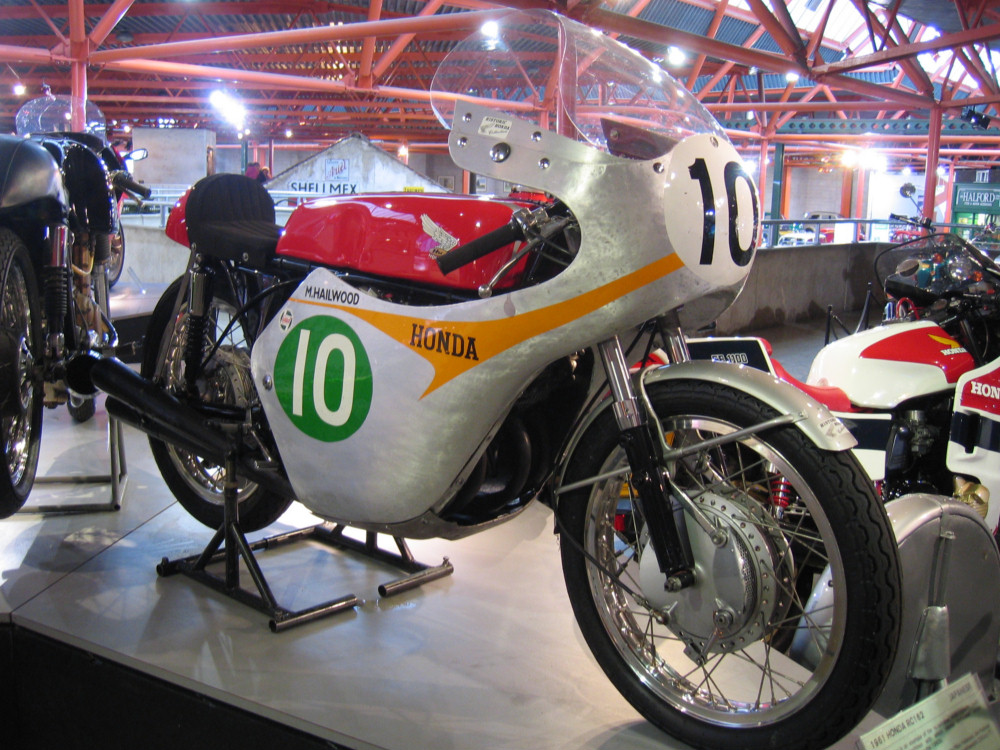
Honda RC162 as ridden by Hailwood in 1961

By 1961, Hailwood was racing for up-and-coming Japanese factory Honda. In June 1961, he became the first man in the history of the Isle of Man TT to win three races in one week when he won in the 125 cc, 250 cc and 500 cc categories. He lost the chance at winning a fourth race when his 350 AJS failed with a broken gudgeon pin whilst leading. Riding a four-stroke, four-cylinder 250 cc Honda RC162, Hailwood won the 1961 250cc world championship.

In 1962, Hailwood signed with MV Agusta and went on to become the first rider to win four consecutive 500cc World Championships.

In February 1964 during preparations for the US Grand Prix, Hailwood set a new one-hour speed record on the MV 500 cc recording an average speed of 144.8 mph (233.0 km/h) on the oval-shaped, banked speed-bowl at the Daytona circuit. The previous record of 143 mph (230 km/h) was set by Bob McIntyre on a 350 cc Gilera at Monza in 1957. Hailwood then went on to win the GP race, which carried World Championship points, in the afternoon of the same day.

During 1965, Hailwood entered selected UK events riding for the Tom Kirby Team. In heavy rain, Hailwood won the 1965 Hutchinson 100 Production race at the Silverstone circuit on a BSA Lightning Clubman entered by dealer Tom Kirby, beating the Triumph Bonnevilles entered by Syd Lawton. The 'Hutch' was a main production race of the season along with the Thruxton 500, so it was very important for manufacturers to establish the racing potential of their recent models. As this was production-based racing open to all entrants, 'official' works teams were ineligible; instead, machines were prepared and entered through well-established factory dealers. BSA Lightning Clubmans were ridden by Hailwood (carrying number 1 on the fairing) and factory rider Tony Smith, whilst Triumph Bonnevilles were ridden by World Champion Phil Read and works employee Percy Tait. Conditions were poor and Smith retired from the race at slippery Stowe Corner. Hailwood lapped at 83 mph (134 km/h) to establish his winning lead.

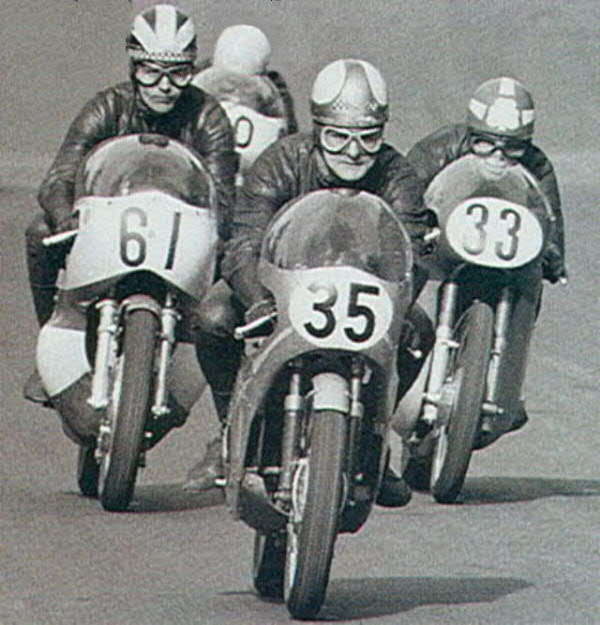
Hailwood 35 leading from the start of a 250 race at Cadwell Park with Phil Read on Yamaha number 61 closely followed by Rod Gould Bultaco 33, around 1967

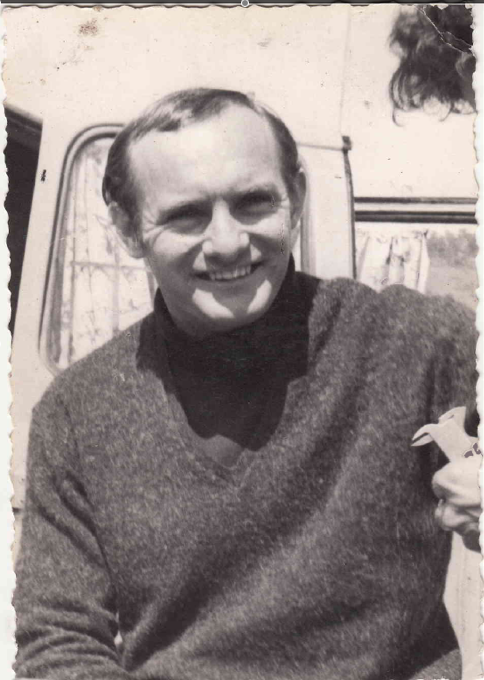
Hailwood at the 1967 French Grand Prix

After his successes with MV Agusta, Hailwood went back to Honda and won four more world titles in 1966 and 1967 in the 250 cc and 350 cc categories. At the 'Motor Cycle' 500 race at Brands Hatch in 1966, Hailwood demonstrated a Honda CB450 Black Bomber fitted with a sports fairing. It was unable to compete in the 500cc category, the Fédération Internationale de Motocyclisme (FIM) deeming that it was not classified as a production machine as it had two overhead camshafts.

Hailwood enjoyed great success at the Isle of Man TT. By 1967, he had won 12 times on the island mountain course. He won what many historians consider to be the most dramatic Isle of Man race of all time, the 1967 Senior TT against his great rival, Giacomo Agostini. In that race he set a lap record of 108.77 mph (175.05 km/h) on the Honda RC181, that stood for the next eight years.

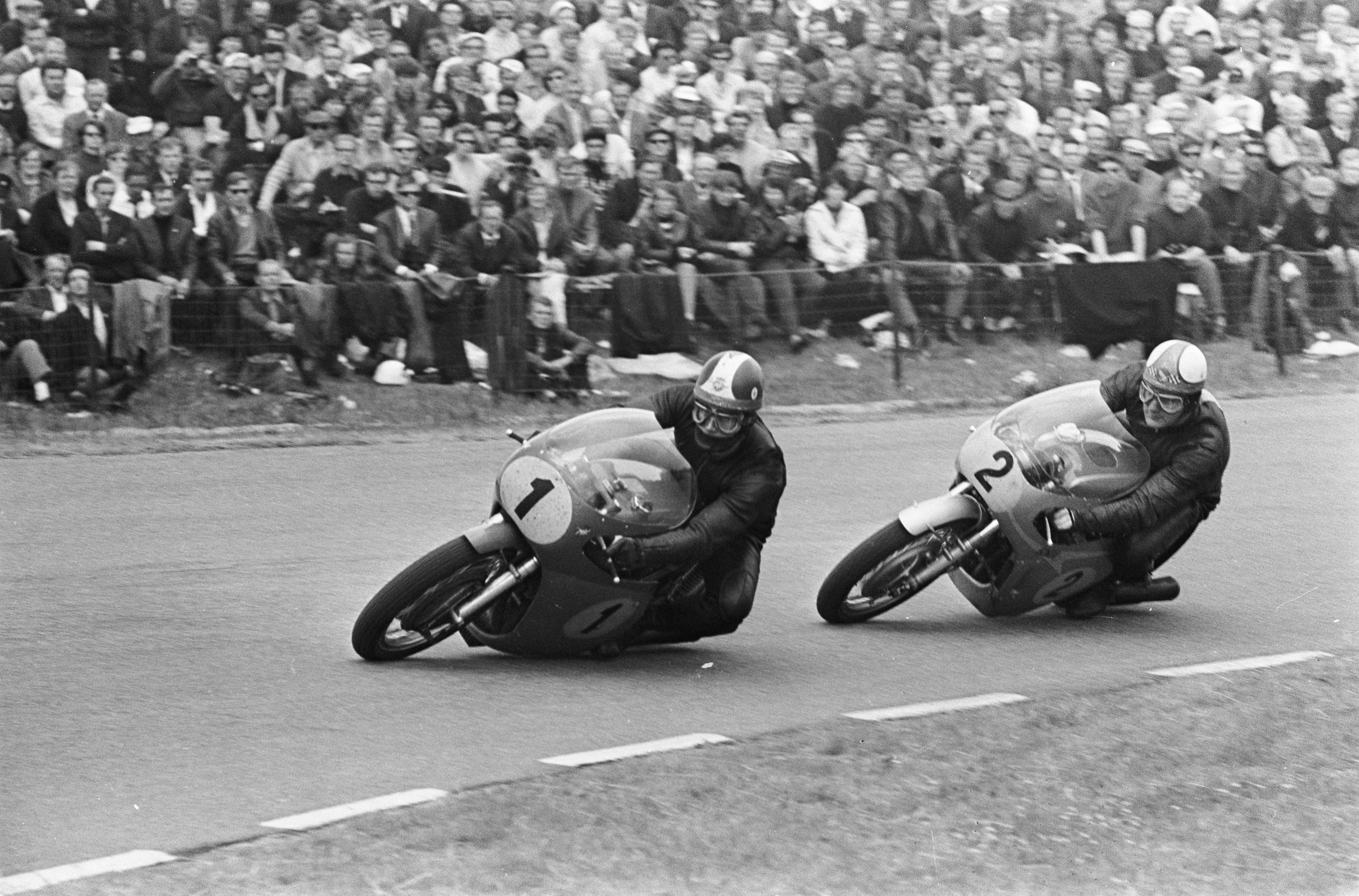
Hailwood (2) dueling with Giacomo Agostini (1) during the 1967 500cc Dutch TT.

After suffering breakdowns in 1967, Hailwood had intended to re-sign for Honda provided the 1968 machinery was to his satisfaction, and had relocated to South Africa where he started a building business with former motorcycle Grand Prix rider Frank Perris, completing their first house in October 1967, also selling one to ex-racer Jim Redman. Hailwood stated to Motorcycle Mechanics that even without suitable machinery from Honda he would not go elsewhere, preferring to retire prematurely and he would in any case finish at the end of the 1968 season.

For 1968, Honda pulled out of Grand Prix racing, but paid Hailwood £50,000 (equivalent to over £870,000 at 2020 value) not to ride for another team, in expectation of keeping him as its rider upon return to competition.

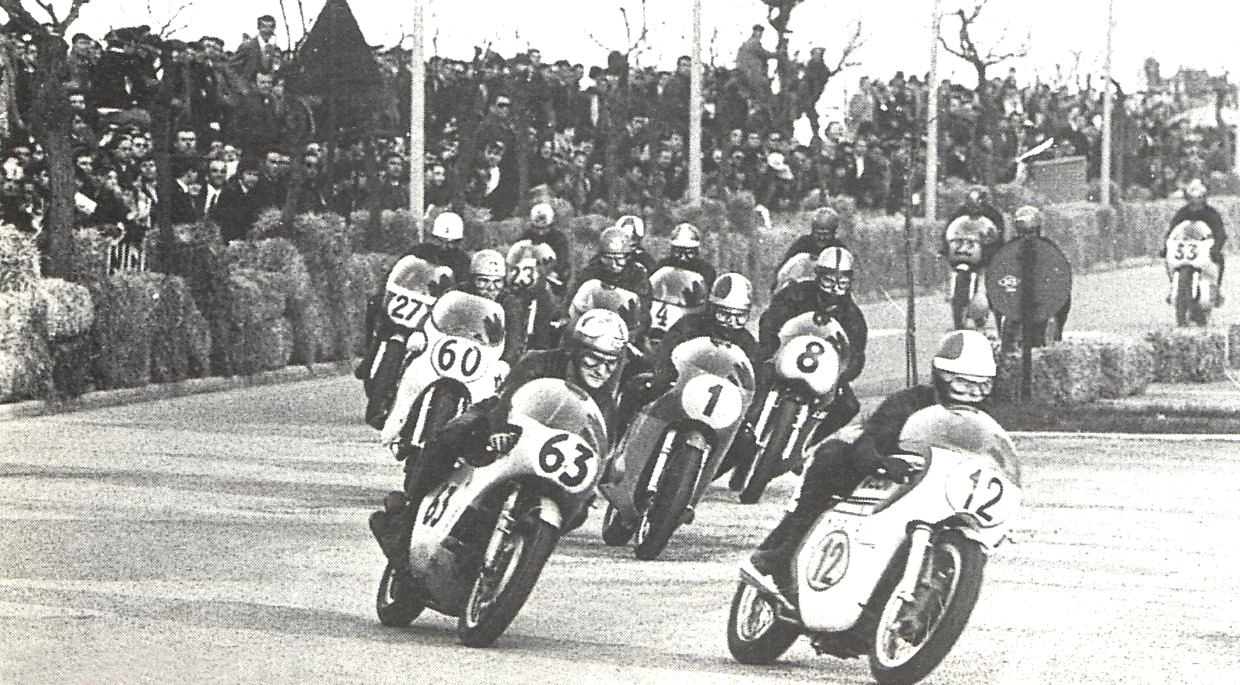
Hailwood (63) and Agostini (1) in the 1969 500 cc race at Riccione street circuit, part of the Temporada Romagnola Italian series of street-races

Hailwood continued to ride Hondas during 1968 and 1969 in selected race meetings without World Championship status including European events in the Temporada Romagnola (Adriatic Season of street-circuits), sometimes wearing an unfamiliar plain-silver helmet, including on a 500 cc engined machine which used frames privately commissioned by Hailwood.

Hailwood also appeared in selected UK events, in 1968 appearing in the post-TT race at Mallory Park on a Honda, and in 1969, he participated in the Mallory Park Race of the Year riding a Seeley

Hailwood had already started to race cars and with no other factory racing teams available to compete against MV Agusta, Hailwood decided to pursue a career in car racing, placing third in the 1969 Le Mans 24-Hour race in France as a co-driver of a Ford GT40 with David Hobbs.

In 1970, Hailwood was again lured back into bike racing, this time by the BSA team riding a Rocket 3 at the Daytona 200 race in Florida, part of a strong BSA/Triumph team. Whilst placed at the head of the field the machine soon failed due to overheating. Hailwood again rode for BSA at the 1971 Daytona race, qualifying on the front row. He led the race but again broke down. Hailwood's son David completed a demonstration lap of the Isle of Man TT course on 3 June 2002, riding his father's Daytona 1971 BSA Rocket 3 carrying large letters 'H' instead of a race number. He crashed at low speed when waving to the spectators at Governor's Bridge, a tight hairpin bend close to the end of the 37-mile course.

== Car racing career ==
During his car racing career, Hailwood raced in Formula One and World Sports Cars, but never achieved the same level of success that he had found on motorcycles. He participated in 50 Formula One Grands Prix, starting with an early phase between 1963 and 1965, debuting in the British Grand Prix on 20 July 1963, achieving two podium finishes and scoring a total of 29 championship points.

Hailwood entered the 1966 24 Hours of Daytona as co-driver to Innes Ireland using a Ferrari, but Ireland broke down with gearbox problems after 3 1/2 hours, before Hailwood was scheduled to participate.

Hailwood was in contention for a victory at his first Formula One race in six years, the 1971 Italian Grand Prix. The first five finishers were covered by only 0.61 seconds, and Hailwood was fourth, 0.18s behind the winner Peter Gethin. He won the 1972 Formula Two European title and earned a podium finish at the 1969 24 Hours of Le Mans. Hailwood ran three full seasons in the European Shellsport F5000 series 1969-71 and was 2nd in the 1972 Tasman F5000 series in which he drove a 5000 engined TS8 F1 chassis.

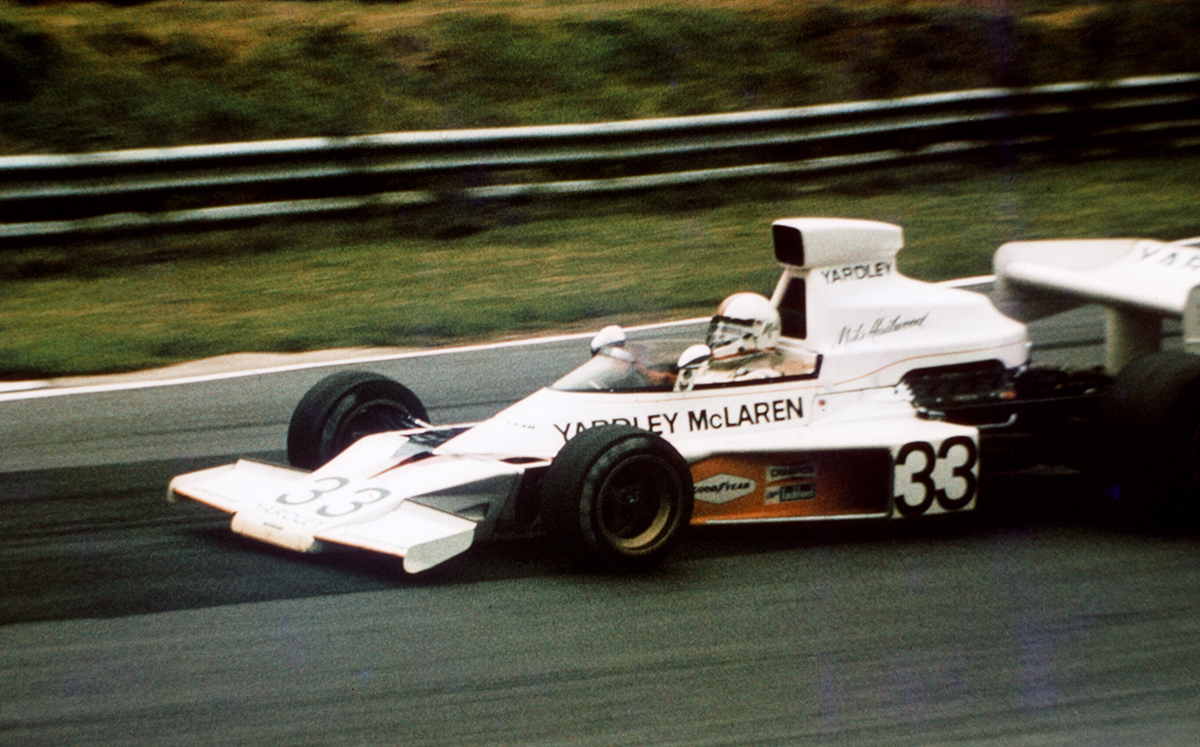
Mike Hailwood driving a Yardley-liveried McLaren M23 at Brands Hatch in 1974

Hailwood was recognised for his bravery when in the 1973 South African Grand Prix he went to pull Clay Regazzoni from his burning car after the two collided on the third lap of the race. Hailwood's driving suit caught fire, but after being extinguished by a fire marshal he returned to help rescue Regazzoni, an act for which he was awarded the George Medal, the second-highest gallantry award that a British civilian can be awarded.

In 1974, Hailwood drove a works Yardley-sponsored McLaren M23 and sometimes outpaced team leader Emerson Fittipaldi. He left Formula One after being injured badly at the 1974 German Grand Prix at the Nürburgring and retired to New Zealand, where he was involved with a marine engineering business together with former McLaren manager Phil Kerr.

Hailwood was the subject of This Is Your Life in 1975 when he was surprised by Eamonn Andrews.

== Comeback ==
In 1977, Hailwood had travelled to Australia to ride large-capacity Ducatis in long-distance races and a 30-lap event on a Yamaha, together with historic race machines. Achieving some success, he entered a 3-hour long-distance event in April 1978, as before with Australian co-rider Jim Scaysbrook. Also in April, Hailwood rode at the Australian motorcycle Grand Prix, for the first time on a 750 Yamaha that he was later to ride in the Classic TT race.

In May 1978, Hailwood rode a demonstration to spectators at a Donington Park national motorcycle race day of the Yamaha XS1100 with full fairing in Martini colours, which he was to use to re-acquaint himself with the TT course, including any subsequent alterations since he raced at the Isle of Man in the late 1960s. Martini was to sponsor most of his TT race machines provided by the UK Yamaha importer Mitsui. He stayed on for the following Monday to test his Yamaha TZ750D, 0W35 (YZR500) and TZ250E race machines together with his F1 TT Ducati which he had previously tested in the rain at Oulton Park.

On 3 June 1978, after an 11-year hiatus from mainstream motorcycling, Hailwood made a comeback at the Isle of Man TT in the Formula I race, a World Championship class based on large-capacity road machines first introduced for 1977.

Few observers believed that Hailwood, now 38-years-old, would be competitive at the TT races after such a long absence, but riding a Ducati 900SS provided by Manchester (UK) dealership Sports Motorcycles, he won the F1 race. Machines for other race categories were provided by Yamaha NV (Netherlands); Hailwood finished 12th in the 250 cc Junior event, 28th in the 500 cc Senior race being affected by a faulty steering damper, and a DNF in the Classic (1000 cc) race.

Hailwood was awarded 'Man of the Year' for 1978 after a public vote organised by Motorcycle News weekly newspaper. After the June 1978 TT races, he again rode in Australia with Scaysbrook in the Castrol Six Hour event, followed by the 1979 Adelaide Three Hour race.

Hailwood raced at the 1979 Isle of Man TT before retiring for good at the age of 39. In that final Isle of Man appearance, he rode a two-stroke Suzuki RG 500 to victory in the Senior TT. He then opted to use that same 500 cc bike in the Unlimited Classic and diced for the lead with Alex George (1100cc Honda) for all six laps. A minute or two apart on the road, they were rarely a few seconds apart on time each lap, Hailwood losing by two seconds.

== Death ==
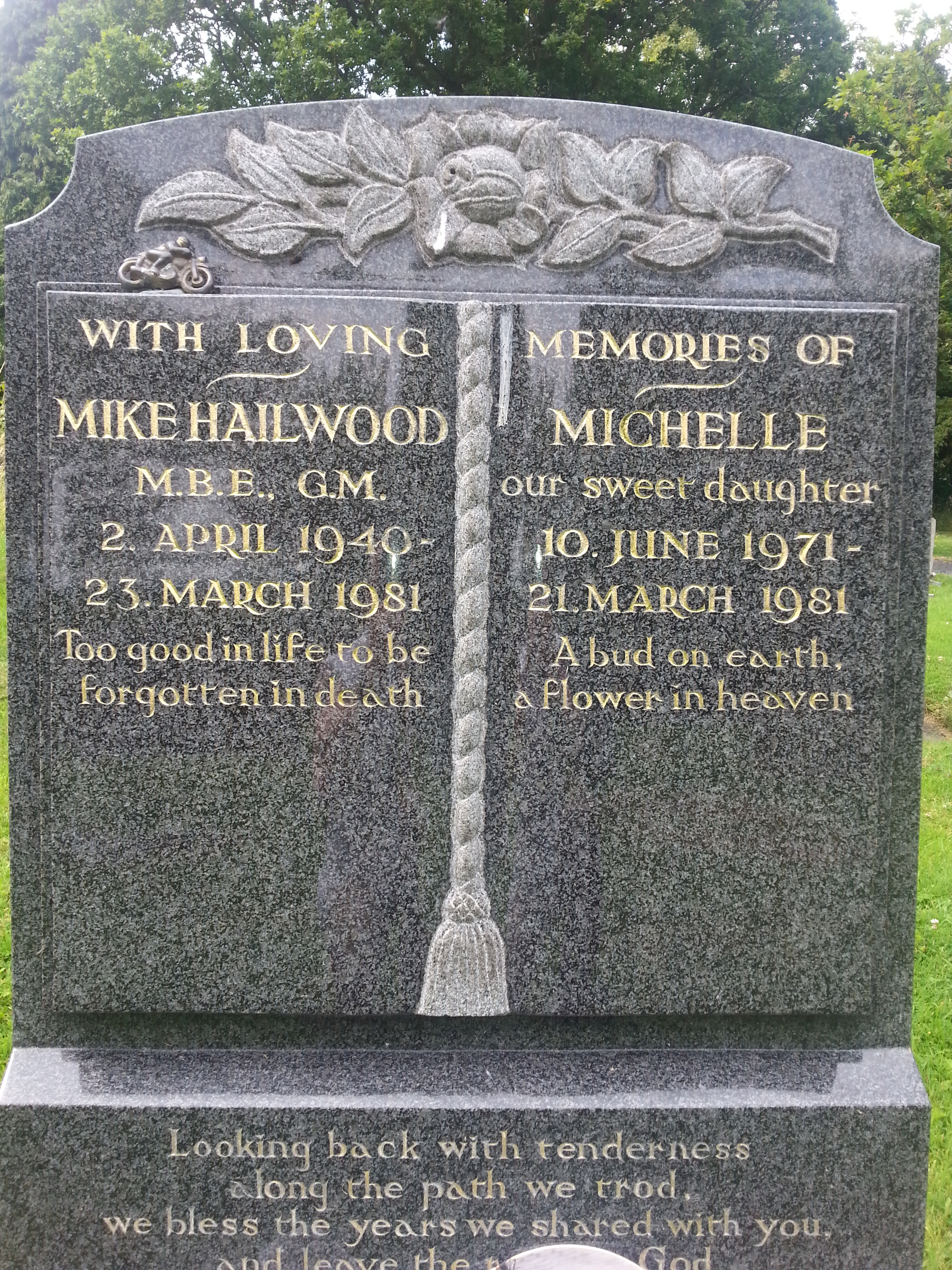
Mike and Michelle Hailwood gravestone at the Church of St Mary Magdalene, Tanworth-in-Arden

Following his retirement from motor sport, in late 1979, Hailwood established a Honda-based retail motorcycle dealership in Birmingham named Hailwood and Gould, in partnership with former motorcycle racer Rodney Gould.

On Saturday 21 March 1981, Hailwood set off in his Rover SD1 with his children Michelle and David to collect some fish and chips. As they returned along the A435 Alcester Road through Portway, Warwickshire, near their home in Tanworth-in-Arden, a lorry made an illegal turn through the barriers onto the central reservation, and their car collided with it. Michelle, aged nine, was killed instantly. Mike and David were taken to hospital, where Mike died two days later from severe internal injuries. He was 40 years old. David survived with minor injuries. The lorry driver was fined £100.

Hailwood's funeral was on 1 April 1981. It was attended by his family, friends and many people from the motorsport world, including Giacomo Agostini, Alain Prost, Nelson Piquet, Alan Jones, John Watson, Rene Arnoux, Gilles Villeneuve, Keke Rosberg, James Hunt, Niki Lauda and Carlos Reutemann.

Hailwood claimed to have been told by a fortune teller in South Africa that he would not live to 40 and would be killed by a truck. The story was repeated by Elizabeth McCarthy in a 1981 memoir, while recounting her relationship with Hailwood, whom she had met at the Canadian Grand Prix in 1967. When he asked for her hand in marriage, she replied that she was hesitant to marry someone who could die at any weekend race. He then told her his story and said; "...I will be killed by one of those damn lorries – so, you see, it won't happen on a track".

== Legacy ==
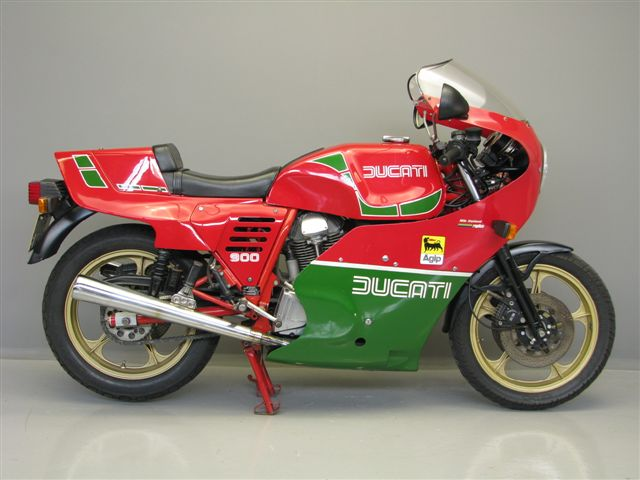
1984 Ducati 900 Mike Hailwood Replica

An annual 'Mike Hailwood Memorial Run' was discontinued after the 2011 event. The starting point was the former Norton factory in Aston, Birmingham, then on to Portway, where the accident occurred, followed by a service at the church in Tanworth-in-Arden.

Hailwood retired with 76 Grand Prix victories, 112 Grand Prix podiums, 14 Isle of Man TT wins and 9 World Championships, including 37 Grand Prix wins, 48 Grand Prix podiums, six Isle of Man TT wins and four World Championships in 500cc.

Hailwood was awarded the Segrave Trophy for 1979 "in recognition of his Isle of Man exploits in the Senior and Classic TTs", with his close friend Ted Macauley also awarded a special Seagrave Medal. Hailwood was the Patron of a small charity – The Joan Seeley Pain Relief Memorial Trust – named in tribute to Colin Seeley's first wife Joan, who died in 1979.

The FIM named Hailwood a Grand Prix "Legend" in 2000. He was inducted into the AMA Motorcycle Hall of Fame in 2000 and the International Motorsports Hall of Fame in 2001.

After Hailwood's victory at the 1978 Isle of Man Formula One motorcycle race, Ducati offered a 900SS-based Mike Hailwood Replica for sale. Approximately 7,000 were sold.

In 1981, a section of the Snaefell Mountain Course was named as Hailwood's Rise leading to the highest point at Hailwood's Height in his honour. In 1984, Pauline Hailwood officially opened the Mike Hailwood Centre, a multi-purpose building located at the TT Grandstand in Douglas run as a refreshment outlet during TT and Manx Grand Prix motorcycle race periods. Operated by the Mike Hailwood Foundation, an Isle of Man-based charity, it is staffed by volunteers and also promotes the races together with supporting new competitors.

== Personal life ==
Coming from a prosperous background, during his early career Hailwood had enjoyed a privileged lifestyle and even before his move from MV to Honda in 1966 was the world's highest-paid rider. He lived a playboy lifestyle as a jet-setter covering 30,000 road miles and 160,000 air miles in a year travelling to circuits around the world whilst based in his bachelor-flat at Heston, west London, where he kept his high-powered sports cars.

In 1964, together with British commentator and journalist Murray Walker, he published a book, The Art of Motorcycle Racing. After relocating to South Africa in 1967, he confirmed to Motorcycle Mechanics in 1968 that he would only be spending the same length of time there as in the previous eight years when he spent two winter months staying at the farm of racer Paddy Driver near Johannesburg. Hailwood also stated "And as far as marriage goes—that's strictly for the birds!"

Hailwood had two children: daughter Michelle in 1971 and son David. He married their mother, model Pauline, on 11 June 1975. Pauline Hailwood died in June 2020 following an illness.

== Racing record ==
=== Motorcycle Grand Prix results ===
**Position**	1	2	3	4	5	6
**Points**	8	6	4	3	2	1

(key) (Races in bold indicate pole position)

Year	Class	Team	1	2	3	4	5	6	7	8	9	10	11	12	13	Points	Rank	Wins
1958	125 cc	Paton	IOM; 7		BEL	GER	SWE	ULS	NAT							0	-	0
1958	125 cc	Ducati		NED; 10												0	-	0
1958	250 cc	NSU	IOM; 3	NED; 4		GER; Ret	SWE; 2	ULS; Ret	NAT							13	4th	0
1958	350 cc	Norton	IOM; 12	NED; 5	BEL	GER; 4	SWE; 3	ULS; 8	NAT							9	6th	0
1958	500 cc	Norton	IOM; 13	NED	BEL	GER	SWE	ULS	NAT							0	-	0
1959	125 cc	Ducati		IOM; 3	GER; 3	NED; 3	BEL; Ret	SWE; 4	ULS; 1	NAT; 8						20	**3rd**	1
1959	250 cc	FB-Mondial		IOM; Ret	GER; 5	NED; 4		SWE; 5	ULS; 2							13	5th	0
1959	250 cc	MZ								NAT; 9						13	5th	0
1959	350 cc	Norton	FRA	IOM; Ret	GER											2	13th	0
1959	350 cc	AJS						SWE; 5	ULS; Ret	NAT						2	13th	0
1959	500 cc	Norton	FRA	IOM; Ret	GER	NED	BEL; 13		ULS	NAT; Ret						0	-	0
1960	125 cc	Ducati		IOM; Ret	NED; 8	BEL; 6		ULS	NAT							1	10th	0
1960	250 cc	Ducati		IOM; Ret		BEL; 4	GER	ULS; 4	NAT; Ret							8	5th	0
1960	250 cc	FB-Mondial			NED; 5											8	5th	0
1960	350 cc	AJS	FRA	IOM; Ret	NED			ULS								0	-	0
1960	350 cc	Ducati							NAT; Ret							0	-	0
1960	500 cc	Norton	FRA	IOM; 3	NED; 5	BEL; 4	GER	ULS; Ret	NAT; 3							13	6th	0
1961	125 cc	EMC	ESP; 4	GER; Ret	FRA; 4											16	6th	1
1961	125 cc	Honda				IOM; 1	NED; Ret	BEL; Ret	DDR; Ret	ULS; 5	NAT	SWE	ARG			16	6th	1
1961	250 cc	FB-Mondial	ESP; Ret													44	1st	4
1961	250 cc	Honda		GER; 8	FRA; 2	IOM; 1	NED; 1	BEL; 3	DDR; 1	ULS; 2	NAT; 2	SWE; 1	ARG			44	1st	4
1961	350 cc	AJS		GER; Ret		IOM; Ret	NED		DDR	ULS						6	8th	0
1961	350 cc	MV Agusta									NAT; 2	SWE; 7				6	8th	0
1961	500 cc	Norton		GER; 4	FRA; 2	IOM; 1	NED; 2	BEL; 2	DDR; 2	ULS; 2						40	2nd	2
1961	500 cc	MV Agusta									NAT; 1	SWE; 2	ARG			40	2nd	2
1962	125 cc	EMC	ESP; 4	FRA; Ret	IOM; Ret	NED; 5	BEL; 4	GER; 3	ULS	DDR	NAT; Ret	FIN	ARG			12	5th	0
1962	125 cc	MZ										FIN; Ret				12	5th	0
1962	250 cc	Benelli	ESP	FRA	IOM; Ret	NED	BEL	GER	ULS		NAT; Ret		ARG			0	-	0
1962	250 cc	MZ								DDR; 2						0	-	0
1962	350 cc	MV Agusta			IOM; 1	NED; 2			ULS; Ret	DDR; 2	NAT	FIN				20	**3rd**	1
1962	500 cc	MV Agusta			IOM; 12	NED; 1	BEL; 1		ULS; 1	DDR; 1	NAT; 1	FIN	ARG			40	**1st**	5
1963	250 cc	MZ	ESP	GER	IOM	NED	BEL	ULS	DDR; 1		NAT	ARG	JPN			8	8th	1
1963	350 cc	MV Agusta		GER	IOM; Ret	NED; 2		ULS; 2	DDR; 1	FIN; 1	NAT; Ret					28	**2nd**	2
1963	500 cc	MV Agusta			IOM; 1	NED; Ret	BEL; 1	ULS; 1	DDR; 1	FIN; 1	NAT; 1	ARG; 1				56	**1st**	7
1964	250 cc	MZ	USA	ESP	FRA	IOM	NED	BEL	GER	DDR; Ret	ULS		NAT	JPN; 5		2	20th	0
1964	350 cc	MV Agusta				IOM	NED; 2		GER	DDR	ULS	FIN	NAT	JPN; 2		12	4th	0
1964	500 cc	MV Agusta	USA; 1			IOM; 1	NED; 1	BEL; 1	GER; 1	DDR; 1	ULS	FIN	NAT; 1			40	**1st**	7
1965	250 cc	Honda	USA	GER	ESP	FRA	IOM	NED		DDR	TCH	ULS	FIN	NAT	JPN; 1	8	10th	1
1965	350 cc	MV Agusta		GER; 2			IOM; Ret	NED; 2		DDR; Ret	TCH; Ret	ULS	FIN	NAT; Ret	JPN; 1	20	**3rd**	1
1965	500 cc	MV Agusta	USA; 1	GER; 1			IOM; 1	NED; 1	BEL; 1	DDR; 1	TCH; 1	ULS	FIN	NAT; 1		48	**1st**	8
1966	125 cc	Honda	ESP	GER		NED		DDR	TCH	FIN	ULS	IOM; 6	NAT	JPN		1	15th	0
1966	250 cc	Honda	ESP; 1	GER; 1	FRA; 1	NED; 1	BEL; 1	DDR; 1	TCH; 1	FIN; 1	ULS	IOM; 1	NAT; 1	JPN		56	**1st**	10
1966	350 cc	Honda		GER; 1	FRA; 1	NED; 1		DDR; Ret	TCH; 1	FIN; 1	ULS; 1	IOM; Ret	NAT	JPN		48	**1st**	6
1966	500 cc	Honda		GER		NED; Ret	BEL; Ret	DDR; Ret	TCH; 1	FIN; 2	ULS; 1	IOM; 1	NAT; Ret			30	**2nd**	3
1967	250 cc	Honda	ESP; Ret	GER	FRA; 3	IOM; 1	NED; 1	BEL; 2	DDR; Ret	TCH; 3	FIN; 1	ULS; 1	NAT; Ret	CAN; 1	JPN; Ret	50	**1st**	5
1967	350 cc	Honda		GER; 1		IOM; 1	NED; 1		DDR; 1	TCH; 1		ULS	NAT		JPN; 1	40	**1st**	6
1967	500 cc	Honda		GER; Ret		IOM; 1	NED; 1	BEL; 2	DDR; Ret	TCH; 1	FIN; Ret	ULS; 1	NAT; 2	CAN; 1		46	**2nd**	5

=== Complete Formula One World Championship results ===
(key) (Races in italics indicate fastest lap)

Year	Entrant	Chassis	Engine	1	2	3	4	5	6	7	8	9	10	11	12	13	14	15	WDC	Pts
1963	Reg Parnell Racing	Lotus 24	Climax FWMV 1.5 V8	MON	BEL	NED	FRA	GBR; 8	GER										NC	0
1963	Reg Parnell Racing	Lola Mk4	Climax FWMV 1.5 V8							ITA; 10	USA	MEX	RSA						NC	0
1964	Reg Parnell Racing	Lotus 25	BRM P56 1.5 V8	MON; 6	NED; 12	BEL	FRA; 8	GBR; Ret	GER; Ret	AUT; 8	ITA; Ret	USA; 8	MEX; Ret						21st	1
1965	Reg Parnell Racing	Lotus 25	BRM P56 1.5 V8	RSA	MON; Ret	BEL	FRA	GBR	NED	GER	ITA	USA	MEX						NC	0
1971	Team Surtees	Surtees TS9	Ford Cosworth DFV 3.0 V8	RSA	ESP	MON	NED	FRA	GBR	GER	AUT	ITA; 4	CAN	USA; 15					18th	3
1972	Brooke Bond Oxo - Rob Walker Team Surtees	Surtees TS9B	Ford Cosworth DFV 3.0 V8	ARG	RSA; Ret	ESP; Ret	MON; Ret	BEL; 4	FRA; 6	GBR; Ret	GER; Ret	AUT; 4	ITA; 2	CAN	USA; 17				8th	13
1973	Brooke Bond Oxo - Rob Walker Team Surtees	Surtees TS14A	Ford Cosworth DFV 3.0 V8	ARG; Ret	BRA; Ret	RSA; Ret	ESP; Ret	BEL; Ret	MON; 8	SWE; Ret	FRA; Ret	GBR; Ret	NED; Ret	GER; 14	AUT; 10	ITA; 7	CAN; 9	USA; Ret	NC	0
1974	Yardley Team McLaren	McLaren M23B	Ford Cosworth DFV 3.0 V8	ARG; 4	BRA; 5	RSA; 3	ESP; 9	BEL; 7	MON; Ret	SWE; Ret	NED; 4	FRA; 7	GBR; Ret	GER; 15	AUT	ITA	CAN	USA	11th	12

=== Complete Formula One non-championship results ===
(key) (Races in italics indicate fastest lap)

Year	Entrant	Chassis	Engine	1	2	3	4	5	6	7	8	9	10	11	12	13	14
1963	Reg Parnell Racing	Lola Mk4	Climax FWMV 1.5 V8	LOM	GLV	PAU	IMO	SYR	AIN	INT	ROM	SOL; NC	KAN	MED	AUT	OUL; 7	RAN
1964	Reg Parnell Racing	Lotus 25	BRM P56 1.5 V8	DMT; Ret	NWT; 5	SYR; 7	AIN; Ret	INT; 6	SOL; 9	MED; Ret	RAN						
1965	Reg Parnell Racing	Lotus 25	BRM P56 1.5 V8	CAP	ROC; Ret	SYR; Ret	SMT; WD	INT; 9	MED	RAN							
1969	Paul Hawkins	Lola T142	Chevrolet 5.0 V8	ROC	INT	MAD; WD											
1969	Epstein-Cuthbert Racing	Lola T142	Chevrolet 5.0 V8				OUL; 5										
1970	Epstein-Cuthbert Racing	Lola T190	Chevrolet 5.0 V8	ROC	INT; 7	OUL; Ret											
1971	Team Surtees	Surtees TS8	Chevrolet 5.0 V8	ARG	ROC	QUE	SPR	INT; 5	RIN	OUL; Ret							
1971	Team Surtees	Surtees TS9	Ford Cosworth DFV 3.0 V8								VIC; Ret						
1972	Brooke Bond Oxo - Rob Walker Team Surtees	Surtees TS9B	Ford Cosworth DFV 3.0 V8	ROC; 2	BRA	INT; Ret	OUL	REP	VIC; 9								
1973	Brooke Bond Oxo - Rob Walker Team Surtees	Surtees TS14A	Ford Cosworth DFV 3.0 V8	ROC; Ret	INT; Ret												
1974	Yardley Team McLaren	McLaren M23B	Ford Cosworth DFV 3.0 V8	PRE	ROC; 4	INT; Ret											

=== Complete European F5000 Championship results ===
(key) (Races in bold indicate pole position; races in italics indicate fastest lap.)

Year	Entrant	Chassis	Engine	1	2	3	4	5	6	7	8	9	10	11	12	13	14	15	16	17	18	19	20	Pos.	Pts
1969	Paul Hawkins	Lola T142	Chevrolet 5.0 V8	OUL; 8	BRH; 10	BRH	MAL; DNS	SIL																3rd	2040
1969	Epstein-Cuthbert Racing	Lola T142	Chevrolet 5.0 V8						MON; 2	KOK; 10	**ZAN**; 3	**SNE**; 2	HOC; 2	**OUL**; 16	BRH; 1									3rd	2040
1970	Epstein-Cuthbert Racing	Lola T190	Chevrolet 5.0 V8	OUL; Ret	BRH; 2	ZOL; 3	**ZAN**; Ret	SIL; 1	BRH; Ret	CAS	MAL; 2	MON; DNS	SIL	MNZ	AND; 4	SAL; 1	THR; 4	SIL	OUL; Ret	**SNE**; 2	HOC			4th	50
1970	Epstein-Cuthbert Racing	Lola T192	Chevrolet 5.0 V8																			OUL; 5	BRH; 3	4th	50
1971	Team Surtees	Surtees TS8	Chevrolet 5.0 V8	**MAL**; 1	SNE	**BRH**; 8	**MON**; 3	**SIL**; 1	CAS	**MAL**; 2	**MNZ**; Ret	MAL; 1	THR; 2	**SIL**; 1	OUL; Ret	SNE; Ret	HOC	OUL; 2	BRH	BRH				2nd	58

=== Complete European Formula Two Championship results ===
(key) (Races in bold indicate pole position; races in italics indicate fastest lap)

Year	Entrant	Chassis	Engine	1	2	3	4	5	6	7	8	9	10	11	12	13	14	15	16	17	Pos.	Pts
1972	Matchbox Team Surtees	Surtees TS10	Ford	MAL; 5	THR; DNS	HOC; Ret	PAU; 5	**PAL**; 2	HOC; Ret	ROU; 2	ÖST; 2	IMO; Ret	MAN; 1	**PER**; Ret	SAL; 1	ALB; 14	HOC; 2				1st	55
1973	FINA Team Surtees	Surtees TS15	Ford	MAL; 2	HOC	THR; DNQ	NÜR	PAU	KIN	NIV	HOC	ROU	MNZ	MAN	KAR; Ret	PER; Ret	SAL	NOR	ALB	VAL	NC	0^{‡}

^{‡} Graded drivers not eligible for European Formula Two Championship points

=== Complete British Saloon Car Championship results ===
(key) (Races in bold indicate pole position; races in italics indicate fastest lap.)

Year	Team	Car	Class	1	2	3	4	5	6	7	8	9	10	11	12	DC	Pts	Class
1970	Duncan Hamilton Racing	Ford Escort TC	C	BRH	SNE	THR	SIL	CRY	SIL	SIL	CRO	BRH	OUL	BRH	BRH ovr:19 cls:9	NC	0	NC

=== 24 Hours of Le Mans results ===
Year	Team	Co-drivers	Car	Class	Laps	Pos.	Class pos.
1969	(United Kingdom) J. W. Automotive Engineering Ltd.	(United Kingdom) David Hobbs	Ford GT40 Mk.I	S 5.0	368	**3rd**	**2nd**
1970	(United Kingdom) J. W. Automotive Engineering Ltd.	(United Kingdom) David Hobbs	Porsche 917K	S 5.0	49	DNF	DNF
1973	(United Kingdom) Gulf Research Racing	(United Kingdom) John Watson (Australia) Vern Schuppan	Mirage M6-Ford Cosworth	S 3.0	112	DNF	DNF
1974	(United Kingdom) Gulf Research Racing	(United Kingdom) Derek Bell	Gulf GR7-Ford Cosworth	S 3.0	317	4th	4th

== See also ==
- Formula One drivers from the United Kingdom

Sporting positions
Preceded by Ronnie Peterson	European Formula Two; Champion; 1972	Succeeded by Jean-Pierre Jarier
Preceded by Phil Read	TT Formula One World Champion; 1978	Succeeded by Ron Haslam
