= Japanese motorcycle Grand Prix =

Motorcycle race held in Japan

Japanese Grand Prix

Grand Prix motorcycle racing
- Venue: Mobility Resort Motegi (1999, 2004–2019, 2022–present); Suzuka Circuit (1963–1965, 1987–1998, 2000–2003); Fuji Speedway (1966–1967)
- First race: 1963
- Most wins (rider): Marc Márquez (6)
- Most wins (manufacturer): Honda (49)

The Japanese motorcycle Grand Prix (日本グランプリ) is a motorcycling event that is part of the FIM Grand Prix motorcycle racing season. The event is due to take place at the Mobility Resort Motegi until at least 2030.

The main venue that held the races for years was the Suzuka Circuit, until it permanently was replaced by the Mobility Resort Motegi from 2004 onwards after the circuit faced criticism for its short runoff areas and dangerous trackside barriers, causing the death of Japanese rider Daijiro Kato and the injuries of Marco Melandri and Alex Barros at the 2003 Japanese Grand Prix. As a result, Suzuka was faced with making considerable safety alterations to avoid a possible strike by the riders – many of whom believed the 240 hp motorbikes had outgrown the tight circuit. The FIM stated that the modifications would not be completed before 2005 and that, therefore, the 2004 Japanese Grand Prix would be held at Motegi, but Suzuka has not appeared on the calendar since.

The 2020 and 2021 races were cancelled due to the outbreak of COVID-19.

== Official names and sponsors ==
- 1963: Grand Prix Race Meeting (no official sponsor)
- 1987–1989, 2001, 2005, 2010–2011: Grand Prix of Japan (no official sponsor)
- 1990–1991: Kibun Japanese Grand Prix
- 1992: Japanese Grand Prix (no official sponsor)
- 1993: Marlboro GP
- 1994–2000: Marlboro Grand Prix of Japan
- 2002–2003: SKYY vodka Grand Prix of Japan
- 2004: Camel Grand Prix of Japan
- 2006–2008: A-Style Grand Prix of Japan
- 2009: Polini Grand Prix of Japan
- 2012–2013: AirAsia Grand Prix of Japan
- 2014–2019, 2022–present: Motul Grand Prix of Japan

== Formerly used circuits ==
Suzuka, used in 1987–1998 and 2000–2003

Fuji, used in 1966–1967

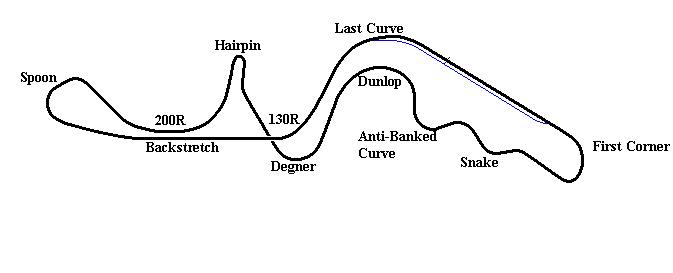
Suzuka layout used in 1962–1965

== Winners ==
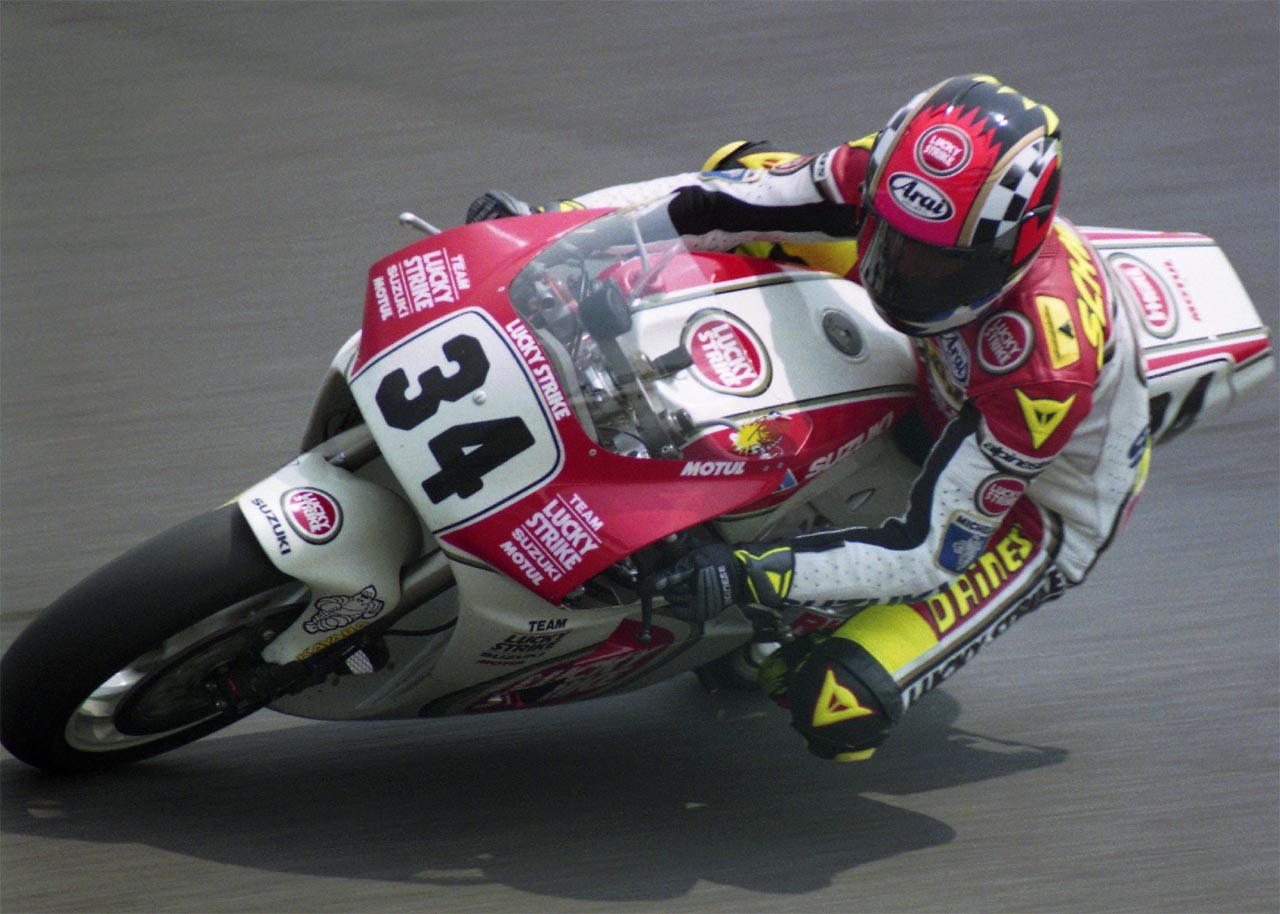
Kevin Schwantz on Suzuki RGV500 at the 1993 Japanese GP

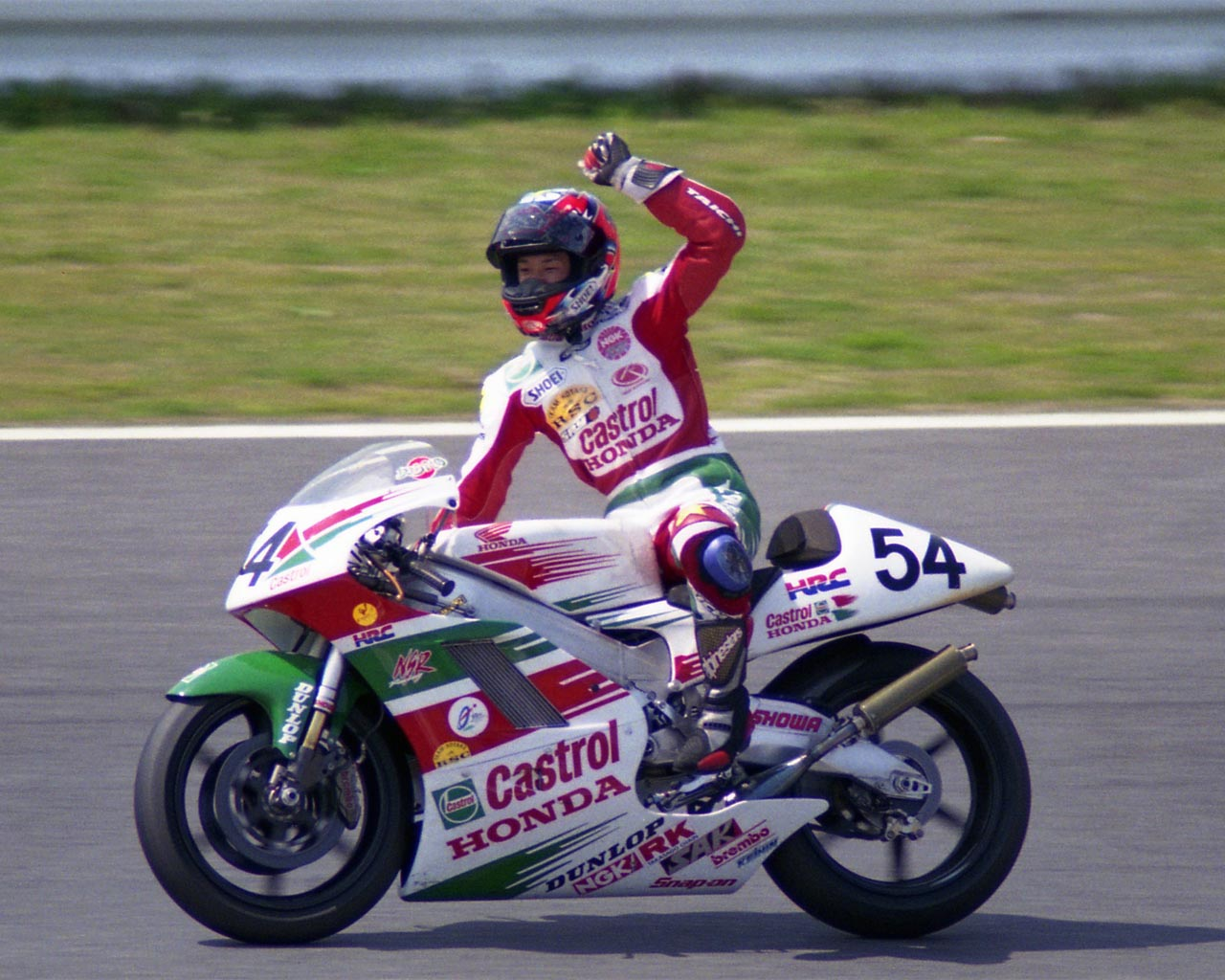
Daijiro Kato winning the 1998 Japanese GP on his Honda NSR250

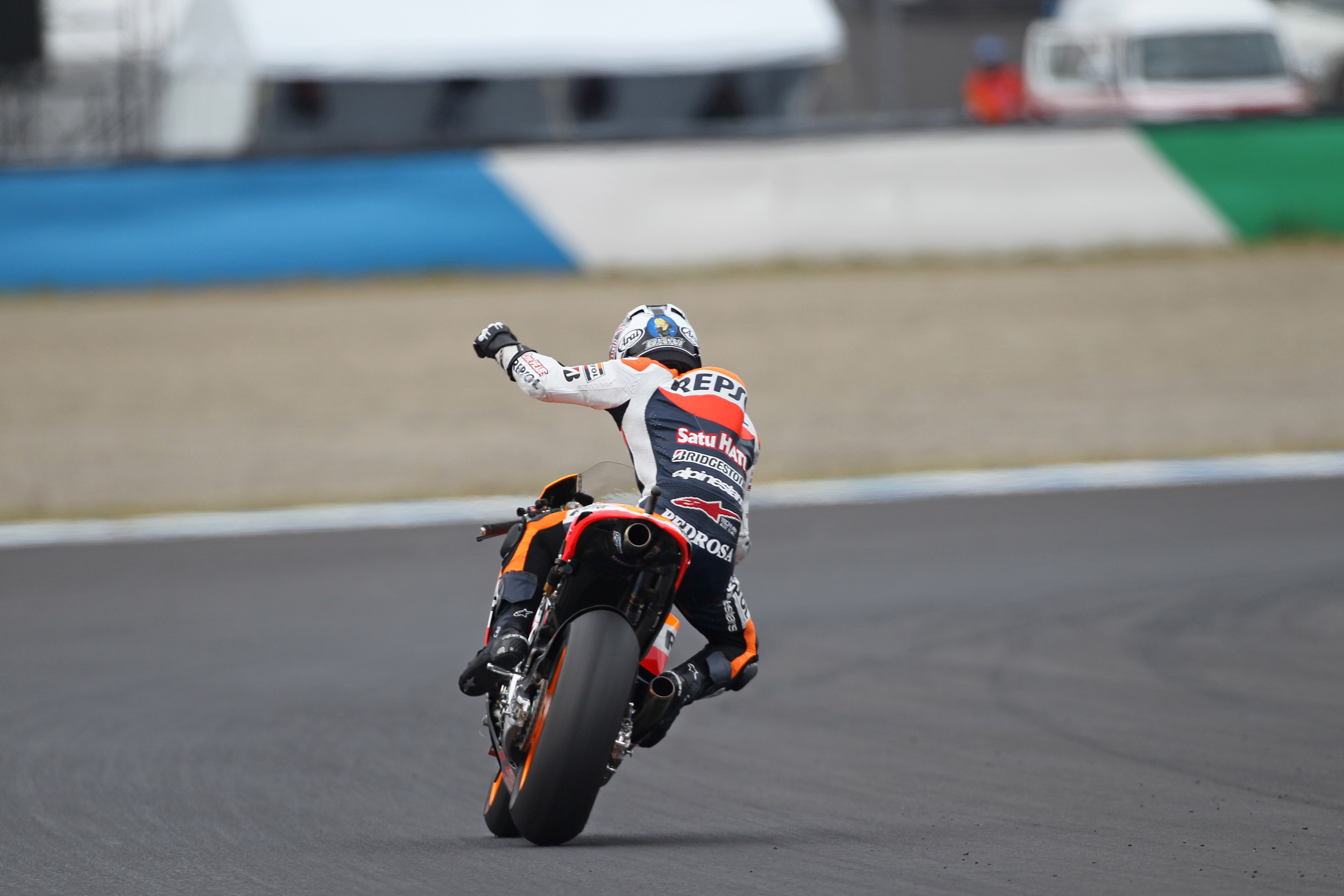
Dani Pedrosa celebrating after winning the 2011 Japanese GP on his Honda RC212V

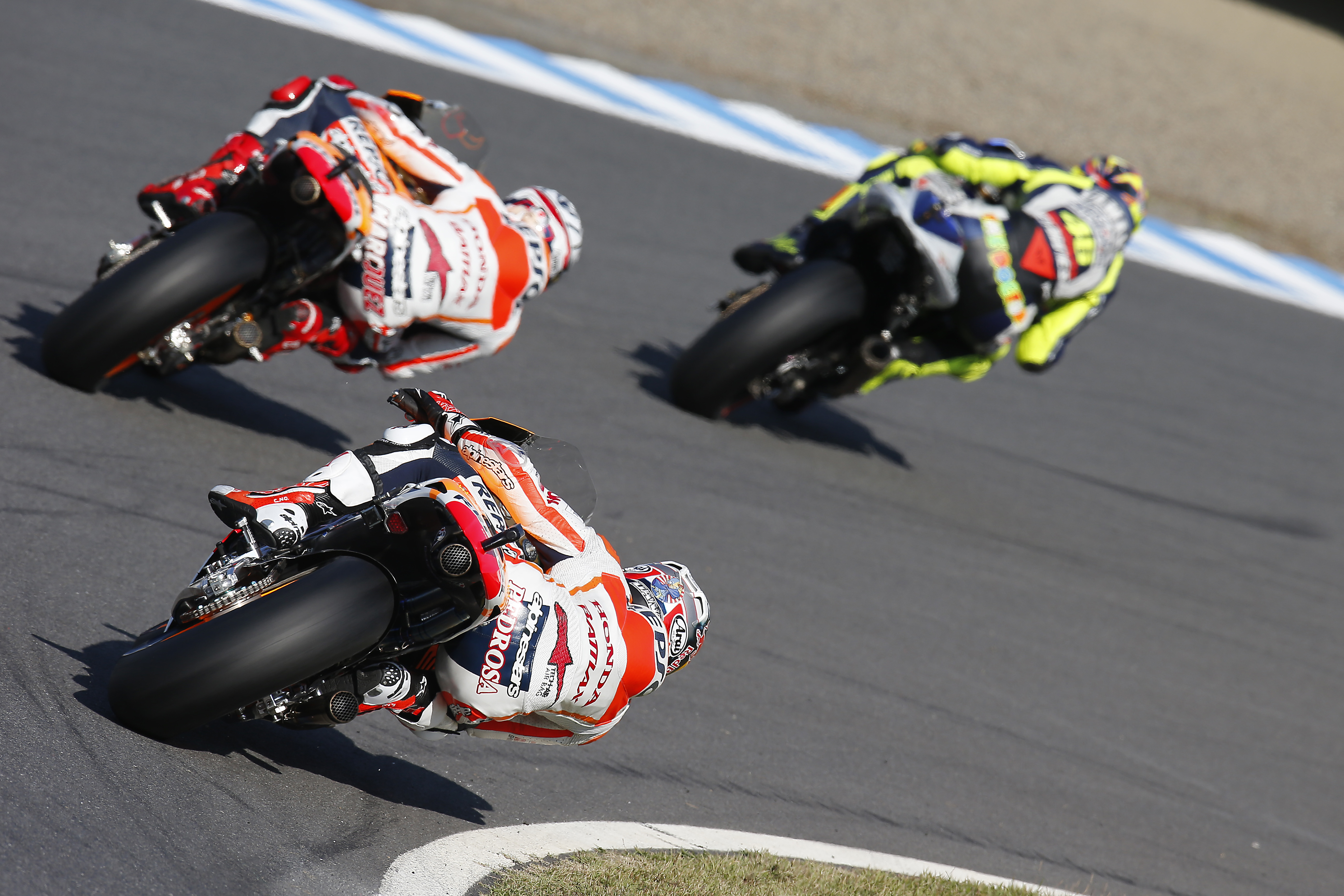
Valentino Rossi in the lead followed by Marc Márquez and Dani Pedrosa at the 2013 Japanese GP

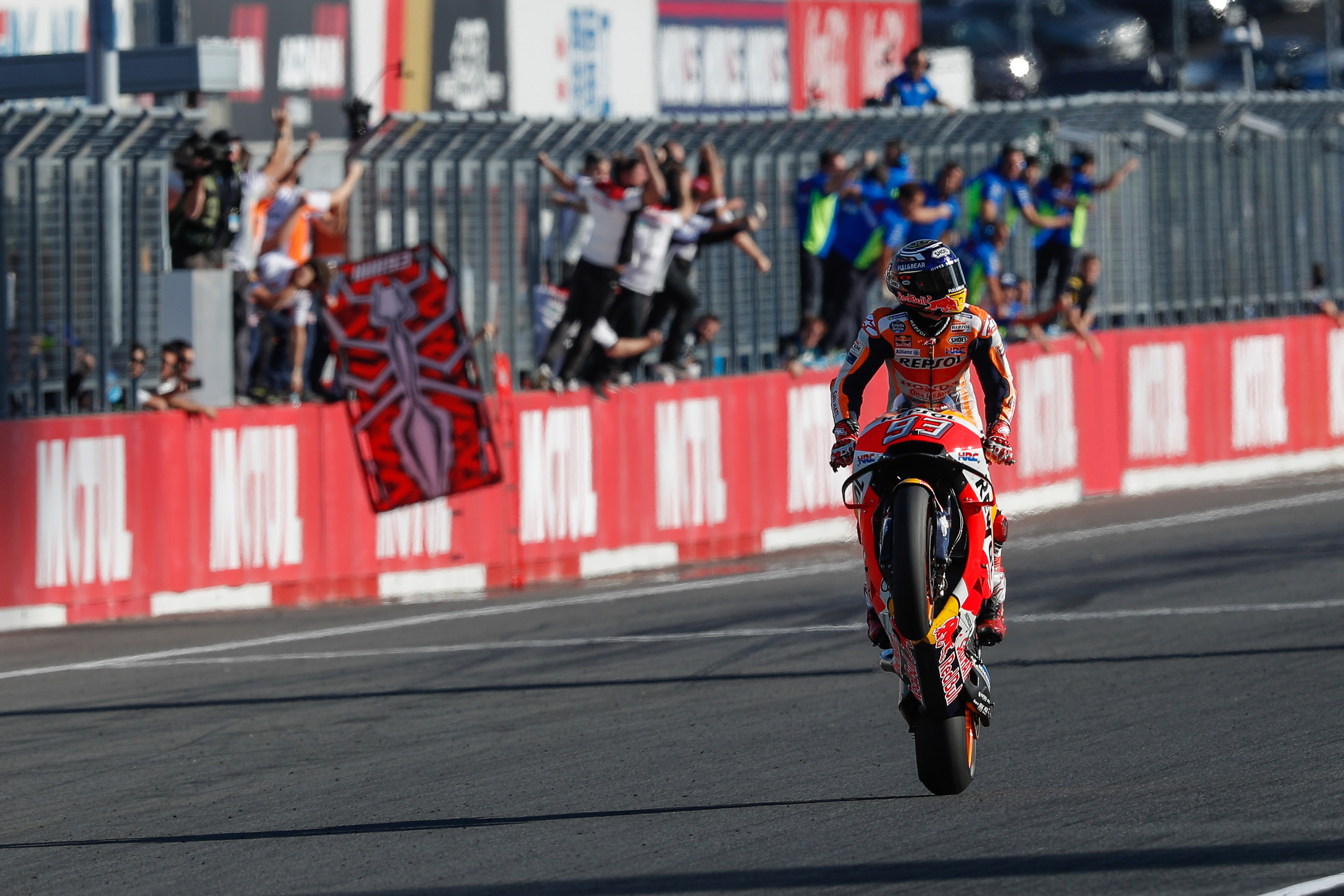
Marc Márquez riding his Honda RC213V while crossing the finish line first at the 2018 Japanese GP

=== Multiple winners (riders) ===
# Wins	Rider	Wins	
# Wins	Rider	Category	Years won
6	(Spain) Marc Márquez	MotoGP	2016, 2018, 2019, 2026
6	(Spain) Marc Márquez	Moto2	2012
6	(Spain) Marc Márquez	125cc	2010
4	(United States) Kevin Schwantz	500cc	1988, 1989, 1991, 1994
4	(Japan) Daijiro Kato	250cc	1997, 1998, 2000, 2001
4	(Italy) Valentino Rossi	MotoGP	2002, 2003, 2008
4	(Italy) Valentino Rossi	500cc	2001
4	(Spain) Dani Pedrosa	MotoGP	2011, 2012, 2015
4	(Spain) Dani Pedrosa	250cc	2004
3	(Rhodesia) Jim Redman	350cc	1964
3	(Rhodesia) Jim Redman	250cc	1963, 1964
3	(United Kingdom) Mike Hailwood	350cc	1965, 1967
3	(United Kingdom) Mike Hailwood	250cc	1965
3	(Italy) Luca Cadalora	250cc	1990, 1991, 1992
3	(Italy) Loris Capirossi	MotoGP	2005, 2006, 2007
3	(Finland) Mika Kallio	250cc	2007
3	(Finland) Mika Kallio	125cc	2005, 2006
3	(Spain) Jorge Lorenzo	MotoGP	2009, 2013, 2014
3	(Spain) Álex Márquez	Moto2	2017
3	(Spain) Álex Márquez	Moto3	2013, 2014
3	(Italy) Francesco Bagnaia	MotoGP	2024, 2025
3	(Italy) Francesco Bagnaia	Moto2	2018
2	(Switzerland) Luigi Taveri	50cc	1963, 1965
2	(United Kingdom) Bill Ivy	125cc	1966, 1967
2	(United States) Wayne Rainey	500cc	1990, 1993
2	(Germany) Ralf Waldmann	250cc	1995
2	(Germany) Ralf Waldmann	125cc	1992
2	(Japan) Noboru Ueda	125cc	1991, 1997
2	(Australia) Mick Doohan	500cc	1992, 1997
2	(Italy) Max Biaggi	500cc	1998
2	(Italy) Max Biaggi	250cc	1996
2	(Japan) Norifumi Abe	500cc	1996, 2000
2	(Japan) Masao Azuma	125cc	1999, 2001
2	(Japan) Hiroshi Aoyama	250cc	2005, 2006
2	(Italy) Andrea Iannone	Moto2	2011
2	(Italy) Andrea Iannone	125cc	2009
2	(France) Johann Zarco	Moto2	2015
2	(France) Johann Zarco	125cc	2011
2	(Switzerland) Thomas Lüthi	Moto2	2014, 2016
2	(Italy) Andrea Dovizioso	MotoGP	2017
2	(Italy) Andrea Dovizioso	125cc	2004
2	(Spain) Izan Guevara	Moto2	2026
2	(Spain) Izan Guevara	Moto3	2022

=== Multiple winners (manufacturers) ===
# Wins	Manufacturer	Wins	
# Wins	Manufacturer	Category	Years won
49	(Japan) Honda	MotoGP	2002, 2003, 2004, 2011, 2012, 2015, 2016, 2018, 2019
49	(Japan) Honda	500cc	1992, 1997, 1998, 2001
49	(Japan) Honda	350cc	1964, 1967
49	(Japan) Honda	250cc	1963, 1964, 1965, 1967, 1987, 1988, 1991, 1992, 1994, 1995, 1997, 1998, 2000, 2001, 2004, 2005
49	(Japan) Honda	Moto3	2014, 2015, 2017, 2019, 2023
49	(Japan) Honda	125cc	1989, 1990, 1991, 1992, 1993, 1994, 1995, 1997, 1999, 2001, 2004
49	(Japan) Honda	50cc	1963, 1965
18	(Japan) Yamaha	MotoGP	2008, 2009, 2013, 2014
18	(Japan) Yamaha	500cc	1987, 1990, 1993, 1996, 2000
18	(Japan) Yamaha	350cc	1966
18	(Japan) Yamaha	250cc	1966, 1989, 1990, 1993, 1999, 2002
18	(Japan) Yamaha	125cc	1966, 1967
11	(Japan) Suzuki	500cc	1988, 1989, 1991, 1994, 1995, 1999
11	(Japan) Suzuki	125cc	1963, 1964, 1965
11	(Japan) Suzuki	50cc	1966, 1967
10	(Italy) Aprilia	250cc	1996, 2003, 2009
10	(Italy) Aprilia	125cc	1996, 1998, 2002, 2003, 2007, 2008, 2009
10	(Germany) Kalex	Moto2	2013, 2015, 2016, 2017, 2018, 2019, 2022, 2023, 2024, 2025
10	(Austria) KTM	250cc	2006, 2007
10	(Austria) KTM	Moto3	2012, 2013, 2016, 2018, 2025, 2026
10	(Austria) KTM	125cc	2005, 2006
10	(Italy) Ducati	MotoGP	2005, 2006, 2007, 2010, 2017, 2022, 2023, 2024, 2025, 2026
3	(Spain) Derbi	125cc	2000, 2010, 2011
3	(Switzerland) Suter	Moto2	2011, 2012, 2014

=== By year ===
A pink background indicates an event that was not part of the Grand Prix motorcycle racing championship.

Year	Track	Moto3		Moto2		MotoGP		Report
Year	Track	Rider	Manufacturer	Rider	Manufacturer	Rider	Manufacturer	Report
2026	Motegi	(Spain) David Almansa	KTM	(Spain) Izan Guevara	Boscoscuro	(Spain) Marc Márquez	Ducati	Report
2025	Motegi	(Spain) David Muñoz	KTM	(Spain) Daniel Holgado	Kalex	(Italy) Francesco Bagnaia	Ducati	Report
2024	Motegi	(Colombia) David Alonso	CFMoto	(Spain) Manuel González	Kalex	(Italy) Francesco Bagnaia	Ducati	Report
2023	Motegi	(Spain) Jaume Masià	Honda	(Thailand) Somkiat Chantra	Kalex	(Spain) Jorge Martín	Ducati	Report
2022	Motegi	(Spain) Izan Guevara	GasGas	(Japan) Ai Ogura	Kalex	(Australia) Jack Miller	Ducati	Report
2021	Motegi	Cancelled due to COVID-19 concerns						
2020	Motegi	Cancelled due to COVID-19 concerns						
2019	Motegi	(Italy) Lorenzo Dalla Porta	Honda	(Italy) Luca Marini	Kalex	(Spain) Marc Márquez	Honda	Report
2018	Motegi	(Italy) Marco Bezzecchi	KTM	(Italy) Francesco Bagnaia	Kalex	(Spain) Marc Márquez	Honda	Report
2017	Motegi	(Italy) Romano Fenati	Honda	(Spain) Álex Márquez	Kalex	(Italy) Andrea Dovizioso	Ducati	Report
2016	Motegi	(Italy) Enea Bastianini	KTM	(Switzerland) Thomas Lüthi	Kalex	(Spain) Marc Márquez	Honda	Report
2015	Motegi	(Italy) Niccolò Antonelli	Honda	(France) Johann Zarco	Kalex	(Spain) Dani Pedrosa	Honda	Report
2014	Motegi	(Spain) Álex Márquez	Honda	(Switzerland) Thomas Lüthi	Suter	(Spain) Jorge Lorenzo	Yamaha	Report
2013	Motegi	(Spain) Álex Márquez	KTM	(Spain) Pol Espargaró	Kalex	(Spain) Jorge Lorenzo	Yamaha	Report
2012	Motegi	(United Kingdom) Danny Kent	KTM	(Spain) Marc Márquez	Suter	(Spain) Dani Pedrosa	Honda	Report
Year	Track	125cc		Moto2		MotoGP		Report
Year	Track	Rider	Manufacturer	Rider	Manufacturer	Rider	Manufacturer	Report
2011	Motegi	(France) Johann Zarco	Derbi	(Italy) Andrea Iannone	Suter	(Spain) Dani Pedrosa	Honda	Report
2010	Motegi	(Spain) Marc Márquez	Derbi	(Spain) Toni Elías	Moriwaki	(Australia) Casey Stoner	Ducati	Report
Year	Track	125cc		250cc		MotoGP		Report
Year	Track	Rider	Manufacturer	Rider	Manufacturer	Rider	Manufacturer	Report
2009	Motegi	(Italy) Andrea Iannone	Aprilia	(Spain) Álvaro Bautista	Aprilia	(Spain) Jorge Lorenzo	Yamaha	Report
2008	Motegi	(Germany) Stefan Bradl	Aprilia	(Italy) Marco Simoncelli	Gilera	(Italy) Valentino Rossi	Yamaha	Report
2007	Motegi	(Italy) Mattia Pasini	Aprilia	(Finland) Mika Kallio	KTM	(Italy) Loris Capirossi	Ducati	Report
2006	Motegi	(Finland) Mika Kallio	KTM	(Japan) Hiroshi Aoyama	KTM	(Italy) Loris Capirossi	Ducati	Report
2005	Motegi	(Finland) Mika Kallio	KTM	(Japan) Hiroshi Aoyama	Honda	(Italy) Loris Capirossi	Ducati	Report
2004	Motegi	(Italy) Andrea Dovizioso	Honda	(Spain) Daniel Pedrosa	Honda	(Japan) Makoto Tamada	Honda	Report
2003	Suzuka	(Italy) Stefano Perugini	Aprilia	(San Marino) Manuel Poggiali	Aprilia	(Italy) Valentino Rossi	Honda	Report
2002	Suzuka	(France) Arnaud Vincent	Aprilia	(Japan) Osamu Miyazaki	Yamaha	(Italy) Valentino Rossi	Honda	Report
Year	Track	125cc		250cc		500cc		Report
Year	Track	Rider	Manufacturer	Rider	Manufacturer	Rider	Manufacturer	Report
2001	Suzuka	(Japan) Masao Azuma	Honda	(Japan) Daijiro Kato	Honda	(Italy) Valentino Rossi	Honda	Report
2000	Suzuka	(Japan) Youichi Ui	Derbi	(Japan) Daijiro Kato	Honda	(Japan) Norifumi Abe	Yamaha	Report
1999	Motegi	(Japan) Masao Azuma	Honda	(Japan) Shinya Nakano	Yamaha	(United States) Kenny Roberts Jr.	Suzuki	Report
1998	Suzuka	(Japan) Kazuto Sakata	Aprilia	(Japan) Daijiro Kato	Honda	(Italy) Max Biaggi	Honda	Report
1997	Suzuka	(Japan) Noboru Ueda	Honda	(Japan) Daijiro Kato	Honda	(Australia) Mick Doohan	Honda	Report
1996	Suzuka	(Japan) Masaki Tokudome	Aprilia	(Italy) Max Biaggi	Aprilia	(Japan) Norifumi Abe	Yamaha	Report
1995	Suzuka	(Japan) Haruchika Aoki	Honda	(Germany) Ralf Waldmann	Honda	(Australia) Daryl Beattie	Suzuki	Report
1994	Suzuka	(Japan) Takeshi Tsujimura	Honda	(Japan) Tadayuki Okada	Honda	(United States) Kevin Schwantz	Suzuki	Report
1993	Suzuka	(Germany) Dirk Raudies	Honda	(Japan) Tetsuya Harada	Yamaha	(United States) Wayne Rainey	Yamaha	Report
1992	Suzuka	(Germany) Ralf Waldmann	Honda	(Italy) Luca Cadalora	Honda	(Australia) Mick Doohan	Honda	Report
1991	Suzuka	(Japan) Noboru Ueda	Honda	(Italy) Luca Cadalora	Honda	(United States) Kevin Schwantz	Suzuki	Report
1990	Suzuka	(Netherlands) Hans Spaan	Honda	(Italy) Luca Cadalora	Yamaha	(United States) Wayne Rainey	Yamaha	Report

Year	Track	80cc		125cc		250cc		500cc		Report
Year	Track	Rider	Manufacturer	Rider	Manufacturer	Rider	Manufacturer	Rider	Manufacturer	Report
1989	Suzuka			(Italy) Ezio Gianola	Honda	(United States) John Kocinski	Yamaha	(United States) Kevin Schwantz	Suzuki	Report
1988	Suzuka					(Germany) Anton Mang	Honda	(United States) Kevin Schwantz	Suzuki	Report
1987	Suzuka					(Japan) Masaru Kobayashi	Honda	(United States) Randy Mamola	Yamaha	Report

Year	Track	50cc		125cc		250cc		350cc		500cc		Report
Year	Track	Rider	Manufacturer	Rider	Manufacturer	Rider	Manufacturer	Rider	Manufacturer	Rider	Manufacturer	Report
1967	Fuji	(Japan) Mitsuo Itoh	Suzuki	(United Kingdom) Bill Ivy	Yamaha	(United Kingdom) Ralph Bryans	Honda	(United Kingdom) Mike Hailwood	Honda			Report
1966	Fuji	(Japan) Yoshimi Katayama	Suzuki	(United Kingdom) Bill Ivy	Yamaha	(Japan) Hiroshi Hasegawa	Yamaha	(United Kingdom) Phil Read	Yamaha			Report
1965	Suzuka	(Switzerland) Luigi Taveri	Honda	(New Zealand) Hugh Anderson	Suzuki	(United Kingdom) Mike Hailwood	Honda	(United Kingdom) Mike Hailwood	MV Agusta			Report
1964	Suzuka	(United Kingdom) Ralph Bryans (Note: The 1964 50cc race only had five competitors and the race was excluded from the world championship.)	Honda	(East Germany) Ernst Degner	Suzuki	(Rhodesia) Jim Redman	Honda	(Rhodesia) Jim Redman	Honda			Report
1963	Suzuka	(Switzerland) Luigi Taveri	Honda	(United Kingdom) Frank Perris	Suzuki	(Federation of Rhodesia and Nyasaland) Jim Redman	Honda	(Federation of Rhodesia and Nyasaland) Jim Redman (Note: The 1963 350cc race only had three competitors and the race was excluded from the world championship.)	Honda			Report
1962	Suzuka	(United Kingdom) Tommy Robb	Honda	(United Kingdom) Tommy Robb	Honda	(Federation of Rhodesia and Nyasaland) Jim Redman	Honda	(Federation of Rhodesia and Nyasaland) Jim Redman	Honda			Report
