= Bert Schneider (motorcyclist) =

Austrian motorcycle racer

- Schneider with his 500 cc Manx Norton and winner's trophy at the 1964 Le Mans 24-hour car race in France, where there were two supporting motorcycle races during the practice sessions for the car race, to encourage spectator attendance
- Nationality: Austrian
Motorcycle racing career statistics
Grand Prix motorcycle racing
Active years	1961 - 1964
First race	1961 500cc East German Grand Prix
Last race	1964 125cc Finnish Grand Prix
First win	1963 125cc Belgian Grand Prix
Last win	1963 125cc Belgian Grand Prix
Team	Suzuki
Starts / Wins / Podiums / Poles / F. laps / Points; 23 / 1 / 8 / 0 / 0 / 70

Bert Schneider (29 August 1937 – 2 July 2009) was a Grand Prix motorcycle road racer from Austria. His best years were in 1962 when he finished fourth place in the 500 cc world championship, and in 1964 when he finished fourth in the 125 cc world championship. He won a single Grand Prix race during his career, the 1963 125 cc Belgian Grand Prix.
