= SB2 =

SB2 may refer to:

- .sb2 file, a file format for Scratch
- Antimonide
- S3 (classification), or SB2, a disability swimming classification for breastroke
- Scratchbox 2, a cross-compilation toolkit for Linux
- Surface Book 2, a Microsoft computer
- Tupolev SB, a Russian 1930s bomber
- a form of Methanobactin produced by Methylocystis bacteria
- a type of spectroscopic binary star
- a series of Bimota motorcycles by Suzuki
- an upgrade of the Smart Roadster

== See also ==
- Brewster SB2A Buccaneer, an American 1940s dive bomber
- Curtiss SB2C Helldiver, an American 1940s dive bomber
- Vought SB2U Vindicator, an American 1930s dive bomber
- SB20, a class of sailboat
