= List of Bimota motorcycles =

Bimota model names reflect the origin of the engines they begin with: Yamaha engined models being with a "Y", Honda models with a "H", Suzuki versions with a "S", Kawasaki versions with a "K", and Ducati versions with a "D". For example, the DB5 and SB8K are the 5th Ducati-engined and 8th Suzuki-engined models.

== List of models ==
Engine maker	Model	Engine	Quantity	Year of production
Bimota	V Due	Bimota 500 cm^{3} 2-stroke	150	1997–1999
Bimota	V Due Corsa	Bimota 500 cm^{3} 2-stroke	26	1999–2001
Bimota	V Due Corsa Evoluzione	Bimota 500 cm^{3} 2-stroke	120	2001–2003
Bimota	V Due Evoluzione	Bimota 500 cm^{3} 2-stroke	14	2003
Bimota	V Due Racing Edizione Finale	Bimota 500 cm^{3} 2-stroke	30	2005
BMW	BB1 Supermono	Rotax extract from BMW F650	376	1995–1997
BMW	BB1 Supermono Biposto	Rotax extract from BMW F650	148	1996–1997
BMW	BB2	S1000RR	1	2012
BMW	BB3	S1000RR	26	2013-2015
Ducati	666 LE	992 Desmodue DS	1	2003
Ducati	DB1	750 Paso	453	1985–1986
Ducati	DB1 S	750 Paso	63	1986–1987
Ducati	DB1 SR	750 Paso	153	1987–1989
Ducati	DB1 J	400 SS	52	1986–1987
Ducati	DB2	904 Desmodue	408	1993–1995
Ducati	DB2 J	398 Desmodue	106	1994–1995
Ducati	DB2 SR	904 Desmodue	157	1994–1996
Ducati	DB2 EF	904 Desmodue	100	1997–1998
Ducati	DB3 Mantra	904 Desmodue	454	1995–1998
Ducati	DB4	904 Desmodue	264	1999–2000
Ducati	DB4 i.e.	904 Desmodue		2000–2001
Ducati	DB5	992 Desmodue DS		2005
Ducati	DB5 R	992 Desmodue DS		2006–2007
Ducati	DB5 S	1078 Desmodue DS		2007
Ducati	DB5 R	1078 Desmodue DS		2007–2011
Ducati	DB5 Borsalino	1078 Desmodue DS		2007
Ducati	DB5 E Desiderio	1078 Desmodue Evoluzione		2011
Ducati	DB5 RE	1078 Desmodue Evoluzione		2011
Ducati	DB6 Delirio	992 Desmodue DS		2005
Ducati	DB6 Delirio Azzuro	992 Desmodue DS	23	2006
Ducati	DB6 R	1078 Desmodue DS		2007
Ducati	DB6 Borsalino	1078 Desmodue DS		2007
Ducati	DB6 Superlight	1078 Desmodue DS		2010
Ducati	DB6 Delirio E	1078 Desmodue Evoluzione		2011
Ducati	DB6 Delirio RE	1078 Desmodue Evoluzione		2011
Ducati	DB7	1098 Testastretta Evoluzione		2007
Ducati	DB7 Oronero	1098 Testastretta Evoluzione	10	2008
Ducati	DB7 Nerocarbonio	1098 Testastretta Evoluzione	50	2009
Ducati	DB8	1198 Testastretta Evoluzione		2010–2012
Ducati	DB8 SP	1198 Testastretta Evoluzione		2011–2012
Ducati	DB8 Italia	1198 Testastretta 11°		2013
Ducati	DB9 Brivido	1198 Testastretta 11°		2011
Ducati	DB9 Brivido S	1198 Testastretta 11°		2011
Ducati	DB10 B.motard	1078 Desmodue Evoluzione		2011
Ducati	DBx	1078 Desmodue Evoluzione		2013
Ducati	DB11	1198 Testastretta 11°		2013
Ducati	Drako	904 Desmodue	1	2003
Ducati	Tesi 1/D 851	851 Desmoquattro	127	1990–1991
Ducati	Tesi 1/D J	400 SS	51	1992–1993
Ducati	Tesi 1/D 904	904 cm^{3} (derived from 851 Desmoquattro)	20	1991–1992
Ducati	Tesi 1/D SR	904 cm^{3} (derived from 851 Desmoquattro)	144	1992–1993
Ducati	Tesi 1/D ES (Edizione Speciale)	904 cm^{3} (derived from 851 Desmoquattro)	50	1993
Ducati	Tesi 1/D EF (Edizione Finale)	904 cm^{3} (derived from 851 Desmoquattro)	25	1994
Ducati	Tesi 2/D	992 Desmodue DS	25	2005–2006
Ducati	Tesi 3/D Concept	1078 Desmodue DS	29	2007
Ducati	Tesi 3/D	1078 Desmodue DS	300	2008
Ducati	Tesi 3/D Rock Gold	1078 Desmodue DS	1	2009
Gilera	GB1	750 RC	2	1993
Harley-Davidson	HDB1	500 Aermacchi	1	1976–1977
Harley-Davidson	HDB2	250 or 350 Aermacchi	35	1976–1977
Harley-Davidson	HDB3	350 Aermacchi	2	1976–1977
Honda	HB1	CB 750 Four / CB400F	10 / 12 (est)	1975–1976
Honda	HB2	CB 900 Bol d'Or	193	1982–1983
Honda	HB3	CB 1100	101	1983–1985
Honda	HB4	CBR 600 RR Fireblade		2010
Kawasaki	KB1	900 Z1	319	1978–1981
Kawasaki	KB1 T2	Z1000	508	1981–1982
Kawasaki	KB2	Z 500	37	1981–1984
Kawasaki	KB2 J	Z 400	37	1981–1984
Kawasaki	KB2 S	Z 550	72	1981–1984
Kawasaki	KB2 TT	Z 600	62	1981–1984
Kawasaki	KB3	Z 1000 J	112	1983–1984
Kawasaki	KB4	Ninja 1000 SX	?	2022–Present
Kawasaki	KB4 RC	Ninja 1000 SX	?	2023-Present
Kawasaki	Tesi H2	Ninja H2	?	2020–Present
Kawasaki	BX450 Enduro	KX450F	?	2023-Present
Kawasaki	Tesi H2 TERA	Ninja H2	?	2024-Present
Suzuki	SB1	TR500	50	1975–1977
Suzuki	SB2	GS 750	140	1977–1979
Suzuki	SB2 80	GS 750	30	1979–1980
Suzuki	SB3	GS 1000	402	1980–1983
Suzuki	SB4	1100 Katana	272	1983–1984
Suzuki	SB5	GSX 1135	158	1985–1986
Suzuki	SB6	GSX-R 1100	1144	1994–1996
Suzuki	SB6R	GSX-R 1100	600	1997–1998
Suzuki	SB7	GSX-R 750	200	1994–1995
Suzuki	SB8 R	TL 1000 R	250	1998–2000
Suzuki	SB8 RS	TL 1000 R	150 on demand	1998–2000
Suzuki	SB8 K	TL 1000 R		2000
Suzuki	SB8 K Gobert	TL 1000 R		2005
Suzuki	SB8 K Santa Monica	TL 1000 R	24	2005
Yamaha	YB1	TZ 250 or 350	12	1974–1975
Yamaha	YB2	TZ 250 or 350	15	1977
Yamaha	YB3	TZ 250 or 350	15	1978–1980
Yamaha	YB4 R	FZ 750	2	1987
Yamaha	YB4 e.i.	FZ 750	303	1988–1989
Yamaha	YB4 e.i. SP	FZ 750	15	1988–1989
Yamaha	YB5	FJ 1200	208	1987–1988
Yamaha	YB6	FZR 1000	546	1988–1990
Yamaha	YB6 Tuatara	FZR 1000	60	1989–1990
Yamaha	YB6 Exup	FZR 1000	114	1989–1990
Yamaha	YB7	FZR 400	321	1987–1988
Yamaha	YB8	FZR 1000 Exup	252	1990–1992
Yamaha	YB8 Furano	FZR 1000 Exup	152	1992–1993
Yamaha	YB8 E	FZR 1000 Exup	169	1993–1994
Yamaha	YB9 Bellaria	FZR 600	145	1990–1993
Yamaha	YB9 SR	FZR 600	651	1994–1996
Yamaha	YB9 SRI	FZR 600	225	1996–1998
Yamaha	YB10 Dieci	FZR 1000 Exup	224	1991–1994
Yamaha	YB10 Biposto	FZR 1000 Exup	38	1992–1993
Yamaha	YB11 Superleggera	1000 Thunderace	600	1996–1998
Yamaha	YB11 25th Anniversary	1000 Thunderace	50	1998

== See also ==
- List of Benelli motorcycles
- List of Moto Guzzi motorcycles
