= Bimota Tesi =

The Bimota Tesi (translated: "Thesis") is a motorcycle model in the superbike class, produced by the Bimota company of Italy. It is distinctive for its front wheel being mounted via a swinging arm arrangement with hub-center steering, unlike the telescopic forks more common in modern motorcycles.

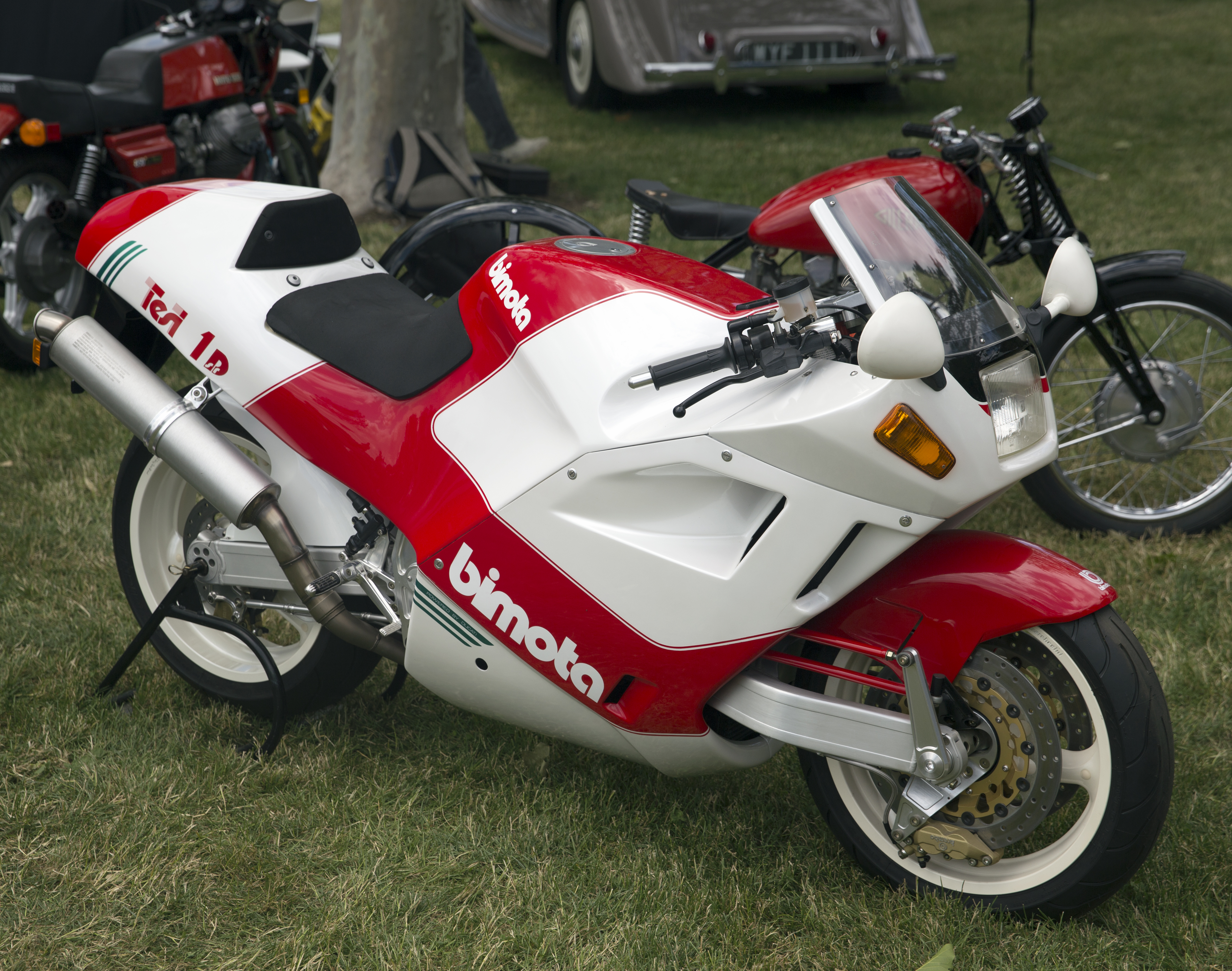
1992 Bimota Tesi 1/D

== Summary ==
While the prototype Bimota Tesi was unveiled in 1983, it was not until 1990 that a road-legal version was commercialized—the Tesi 1/D. The lineage was discontinued in 1994. The model line resurfaced in 2002 with the Tesi 2/D, developed by an Italian tuner who marketed it under his name (Vyrus 984 C³ 4V). This was followed in 2007 by the Tesi 3/D, ensuring the model's continued existence.

The main innovation of the Bimota Tesi is its use of a swingarm and hub-center steering system instead of a conventional telescopic fork. This design is intended to eliminate the "dive" effect of traditional forks under braking and to provide improved stability.

Many Tesi models have been powered by engines from different manufacturers. The early prototypes were equipped with Honda and Yamaha engines, but Ducati was ultimately chosen for the final prototype and all production models up until 2015. Kawasaki later took over, supplying the engine for the Tesi H2. The Tesi was also fitted with the 500 V-Due engine.

Unlike Bimota’s usual naming convention—where the first letter represents the engine manufacturer, the second stands for Bimota, and the number indicates the model’s order of release—the Tesi series follows a different pattern. The initial research leading to the Tesi began when engineering student Pierluigi Marconi, for his university thesis at the University of Bologna, drew inspiration from engineer Difazio's work to develop a motorcycle where the steering and front suspension would be independent. He named the resulting bike Tesi, meaning 'Thesis' in Italian. The letter D stands for the engine manufacturer, and the number represents the model's generation. The first Tesi developed after Kawasaki's investment in Bimota was called the Tesi H2, as it inherited the Kawasaki Ninja H2 engine.

== Architecture ==
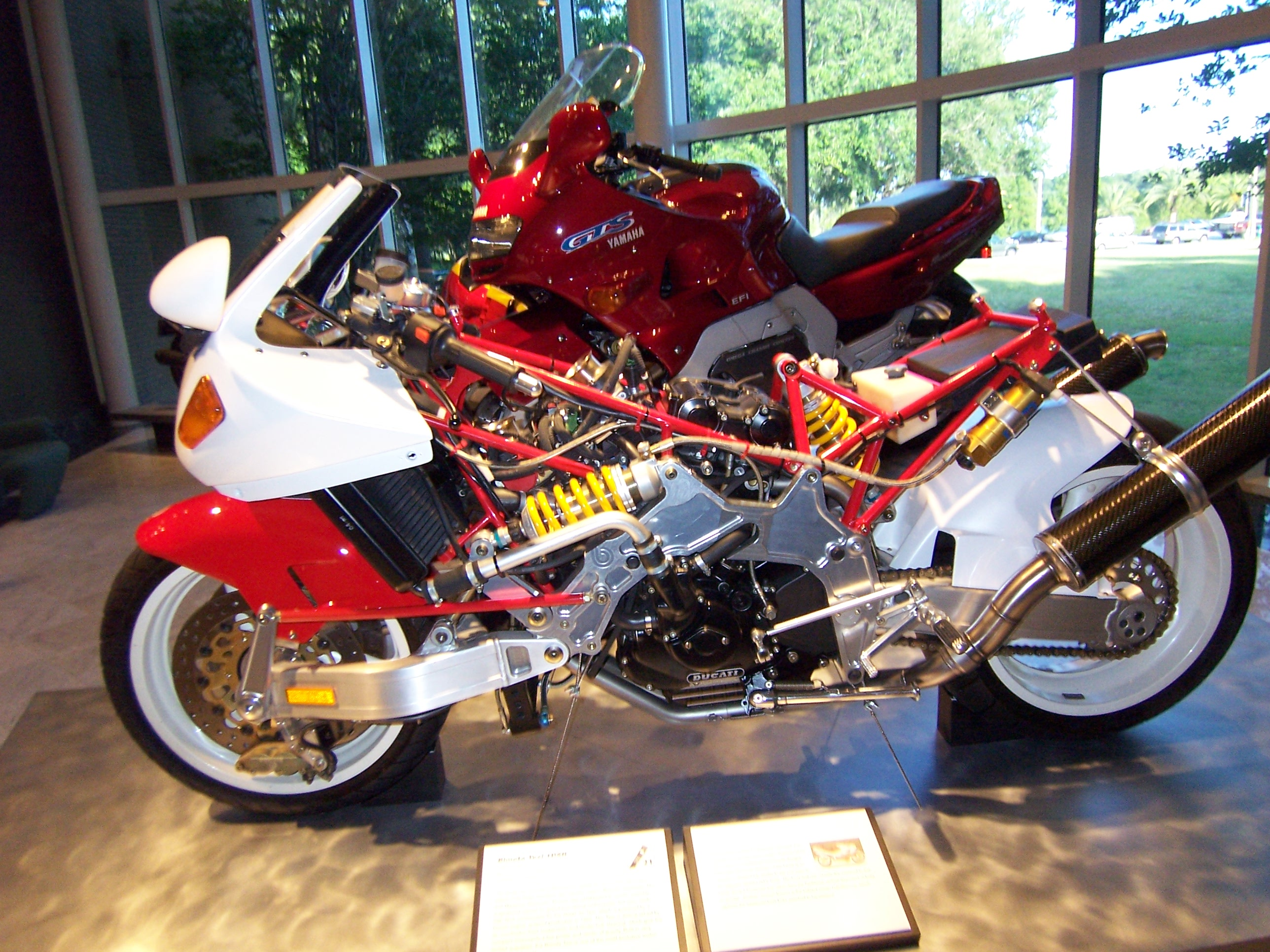
View of the bare Tesi 1/D, with the swingarm and the Ω frame.

The telescopic fork, found on most road motorcycles, combines both steering and suspension, meaning that any movement of one affects the other. Engineer Difazio's design completely separates the two functions, eliminating their negative interactions. As a result, the bike's attitude remains unchanged during braking, unlike with a conventional fork. This setup also allows for geometry adjustments (such as wheelbase and rake) without affecting handling dynamics. While this concept had previously been tested—historically by a number of manufacturers including Ner-A-Car and more recently, for racing, by Mead & Tomkinson and by ELF—it had never before been applied to a road-legal motorcycle. With the Tesi, Bimota brought this innovation to a production model.

The front and rear swingarms are connected by an omega-shaped frame. The wheel hub houses two tapered bearings and an axle, which is connected via a linkage system to a small steering column located against the frame on the left side of the bike. Another linkage connects this column to the lower triple clamp and clip-on handlebars.

The frame itself is reduced to two side plates and two subframes—one at the front to support the fuel tank and handlebars, and one at the rear for the seat unit—resulting in significant weight savings.

However, this architecture requires an extensive number of components to assemble the front suspension system, increasing manufacturing costs. These components must also be heavily reinforced to withstand the forces generated under braking. Additionally, the swingarm increases the turning radius, making maneuvering more difficult. This issue was mitigated in the Tesi 3/D, which features a tubular trellis swingarm, allowing for smaller-diameter tubes without compromising rigidity.

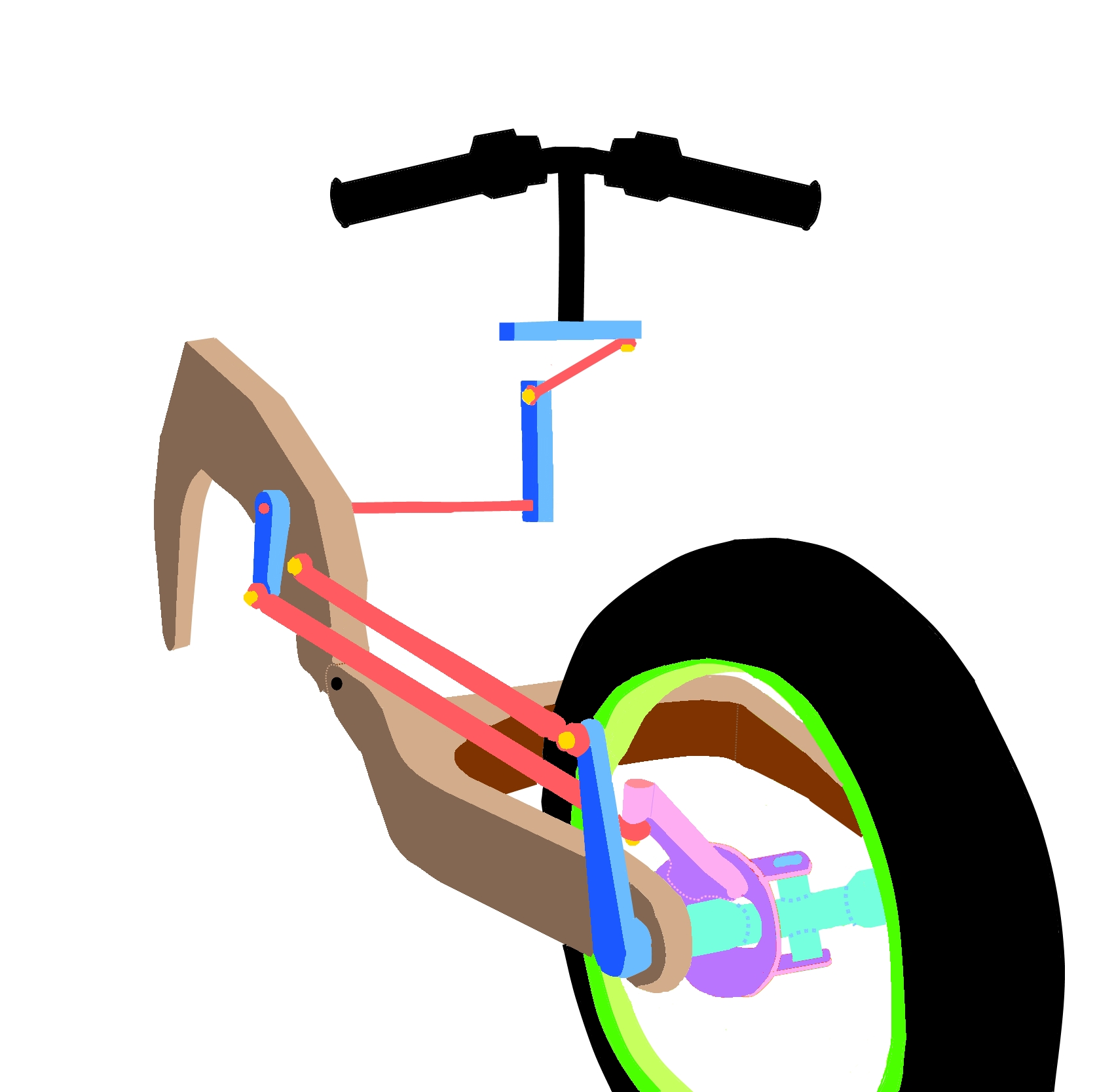
The evolution of the operating principle on the Tesi 1/D.

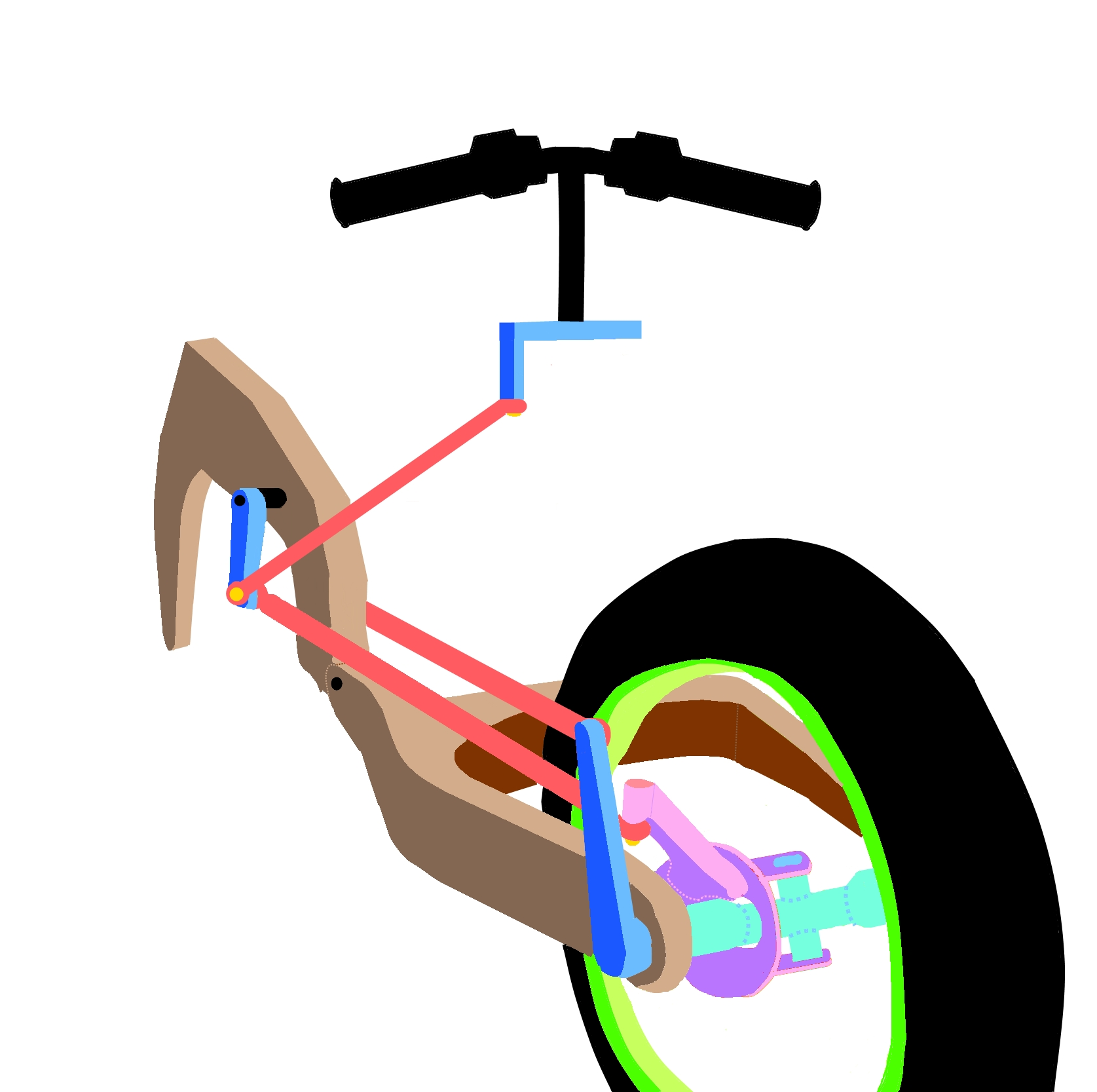
On the 2/D.

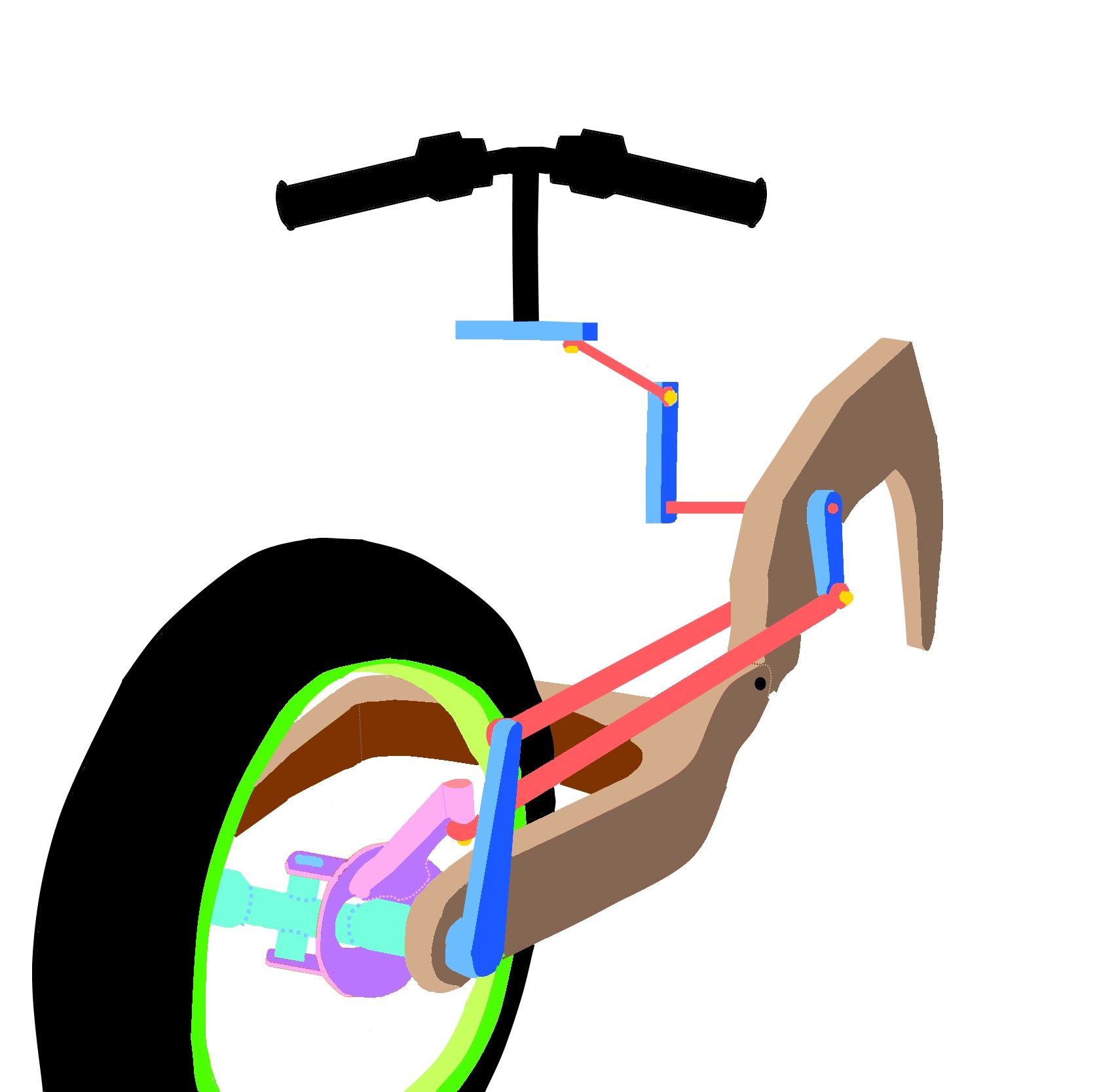
On the 3/D.

== Development ==
The first prototype was presented at the Milan Motorcycle Show in 1983. At that time, it was powered by a Honda VF 400 F engine, and its frame was a carbon fiber monocoque positioned under the engine. The bike had a futuristic design and introduced a hydraulic steering system known as DCS (Dive Control System). This system used two pistons: one on the left side of the wheel and another under the handlebars. When the rider turned the handlebars right, the second piston pushed hydraulic fluid through a hose, compressing the wheel piston. When turning left, the fluid was directed into a second hose, causing the wheel piston to extend.

The following year (1984), Bimota entered a second prototype into the Austrian and Italian rounds of the World Endurance Championship. This version was powered by a Honda VF 750 F engine, producing 90 hp at 10,000 rpm, sourced from Honda's racing division. The frame was upgraded to a hybrid structure made from aluminum alloy, carbon fiber, and Kevlar, supporting the engine. In 1985, this was replaced by two Peraluman 35 omega-shaped beams, encircling the engine from below. While the hydraulic steering system remained, it severely affected maneuverability, making the bike almost impossible to ride at any speed.

In 1987, a new prototype powered by a Yamaha 750 FZ engine marked a significant improvement. The hydraulic steering system was abandoned, and replaced by a linkage system, making the bike much easier to handle. By 1988, Bimota chose Ducati as the engine supplier for the Tesi. Ducati’s engine casings provided better structural rigidity, making them ideal for the Tesi's design. This resulted in a final prototype, which differed from the production model only in its exhaust silencers.

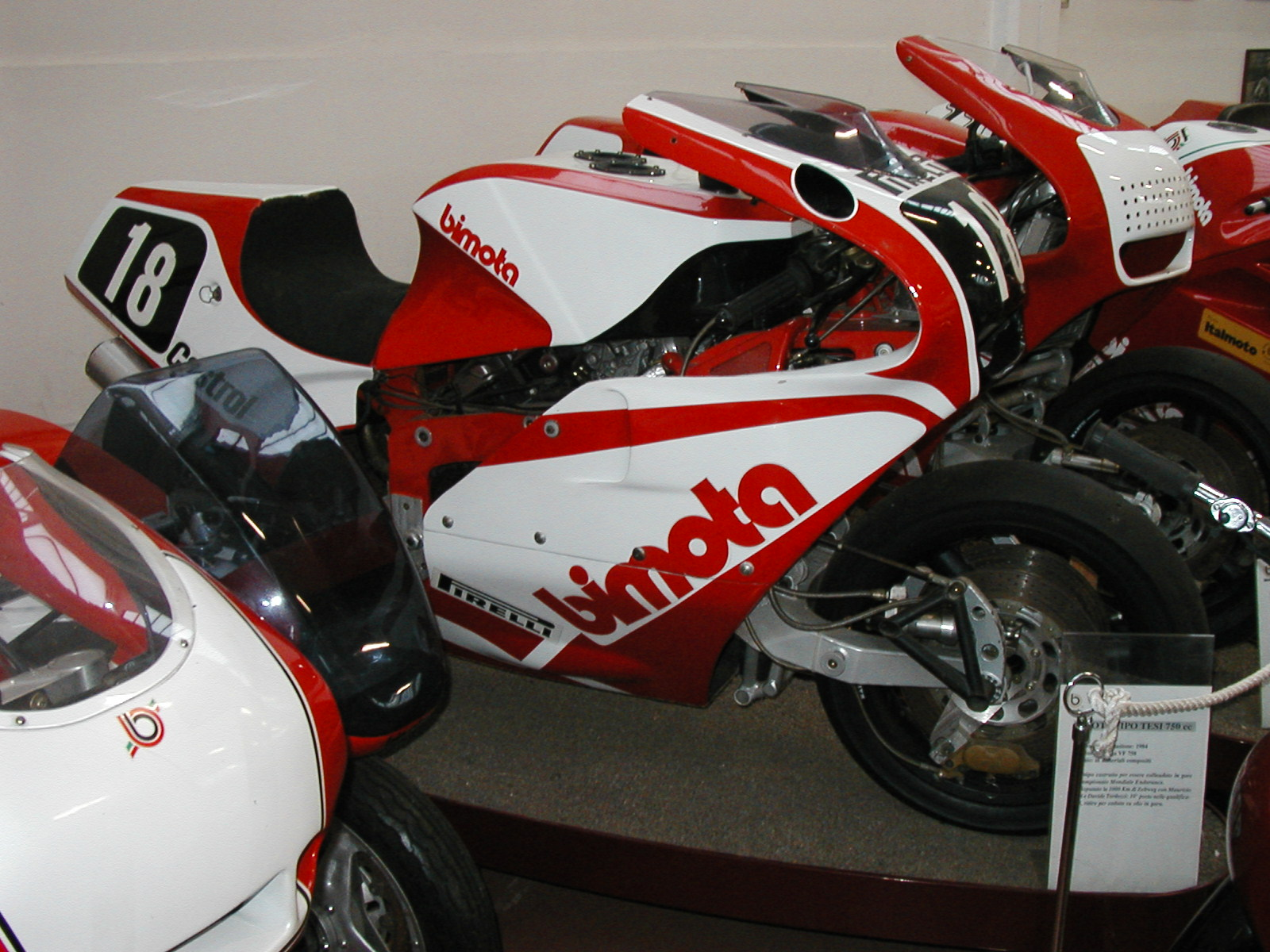
Prototype No. 2

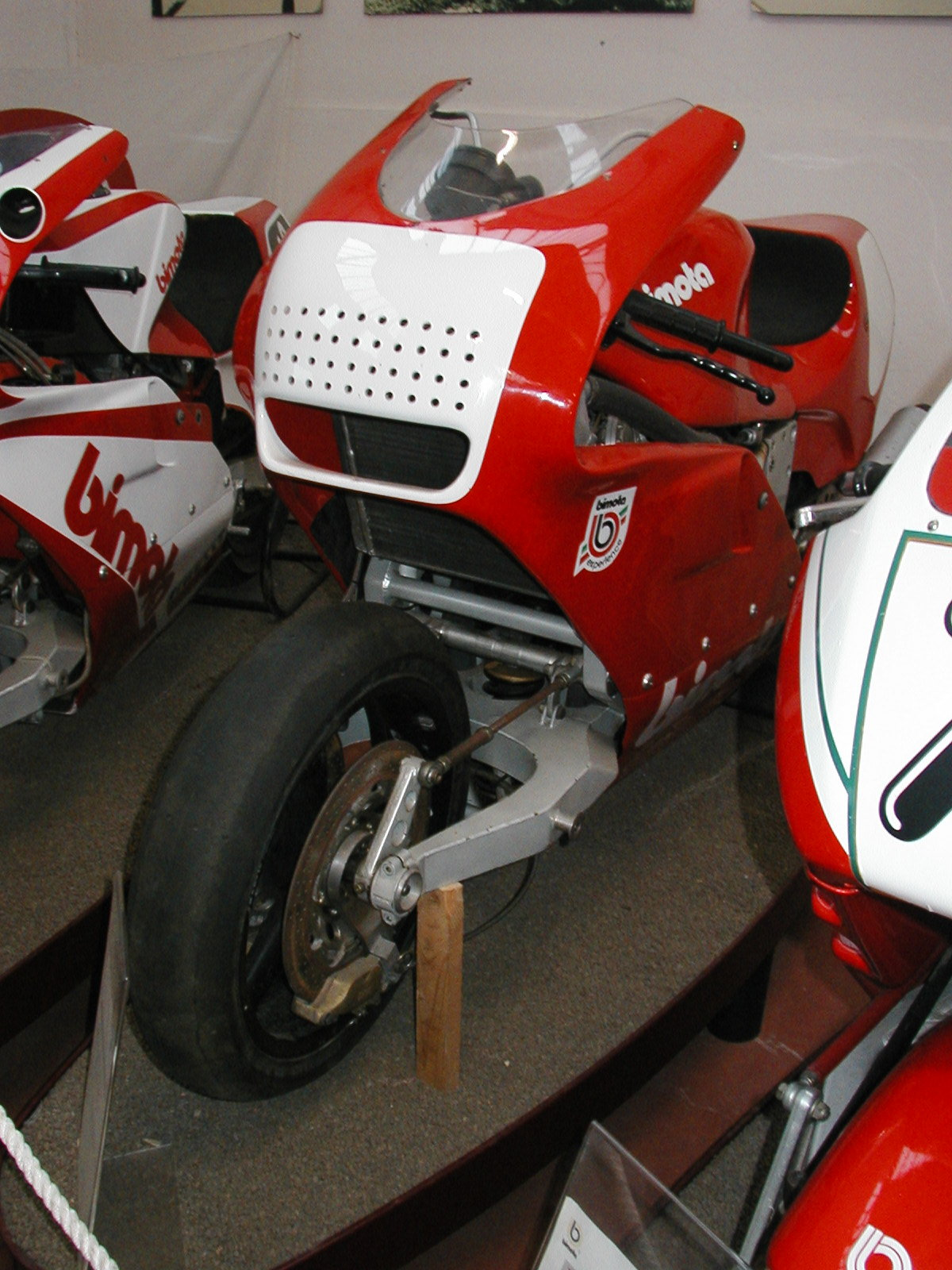
Prototype No. 3

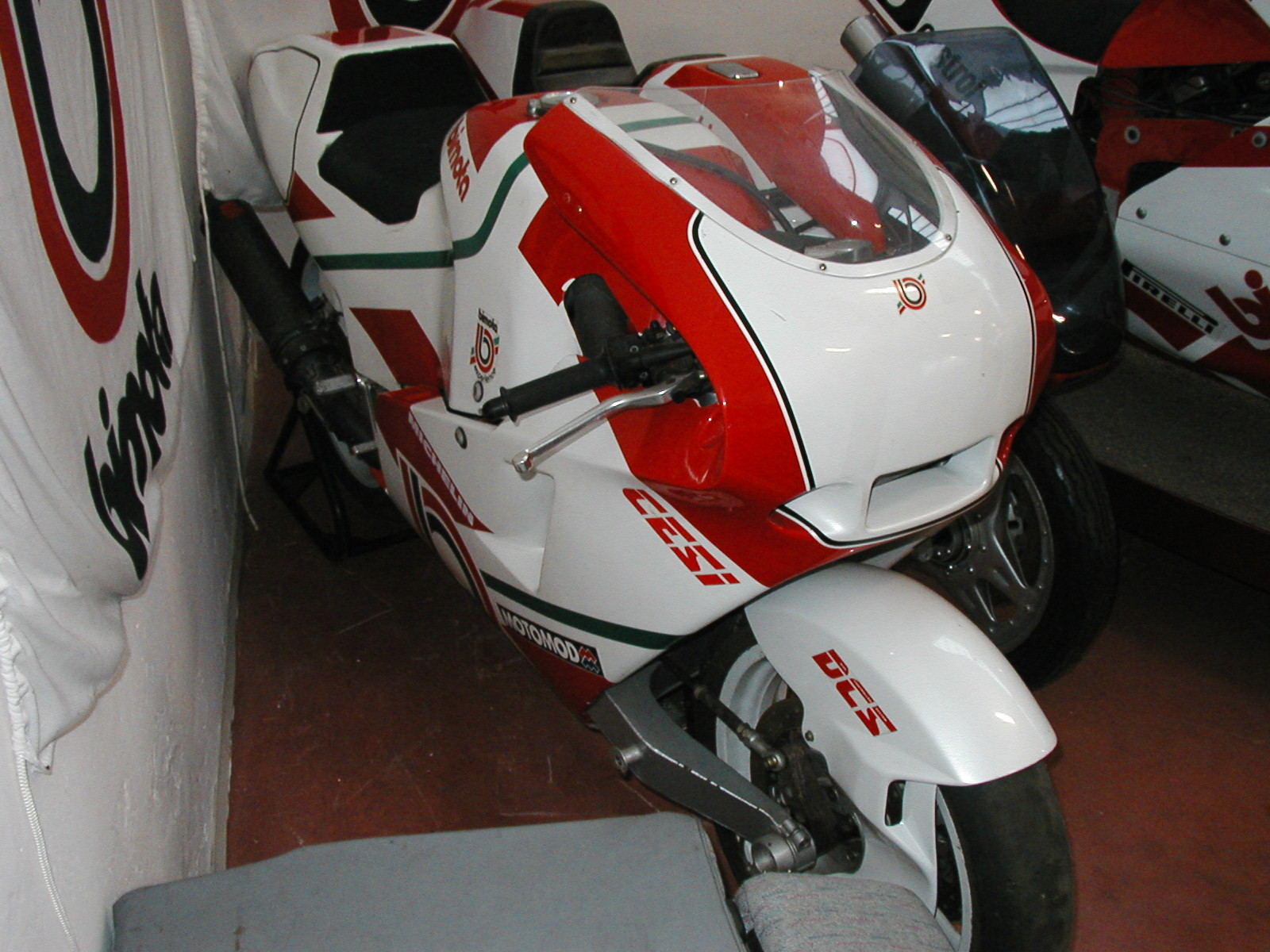
Prototype No. 4, the first to be equipped with linkage steering.

== Engine ==
An initial model was powered by a Yamaha FZ750 engine; subsequently Honda V-4 and then Ducati V-Twin motors were adopted; in the wake of the takeover of Bimota by Kawasaki in 2019, since 2020 they have used motors by Kawasaki.

== Models ==
Bimota produced the first Tesi in 1984. As of 2017, 18 generations of Tesi had been produced. Subsequent models have included the Ducati-powered Tesi 1D, Tesi 2D, Tesi 3D and the Bimota Tesi H2 (2020).

== Tesi 1/D ==
Bimota Tesi 1/D
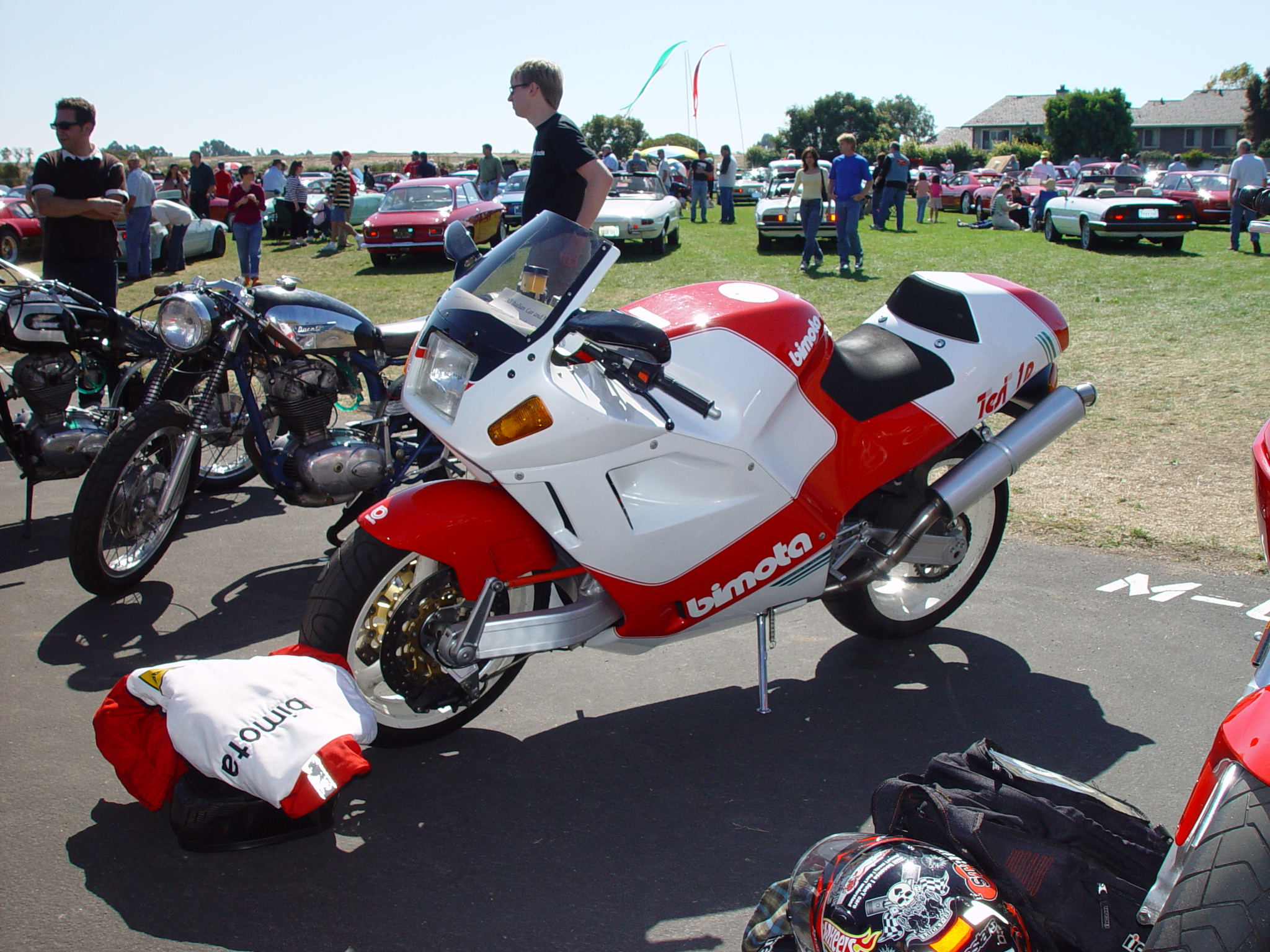
- Bimota Tesi 1/D
- Manufacturer: (Italy) Bimota
- Production: 1990 - 1994
- Class: Sports motorcycle
- Engine: 90° V-twin, 4-stroke liquid-cooled
- Top speed: 6-speed
- Power: 87.5 hp at 8,000 rpm
- Transmission: per chain
- Frame type: Ω-type perimeter fencing
- Suspension: Front suspension (travel) monoshock Rear suspension (travel) monoshock
- Brakes: Front brake (diameter) 2 x ∅ 320 mm discs, 4-piston calipers Rear brake (diameter) 1 x ∅ 245 mm disc, 2-piston caliper
- Tires: Front tire: 120/70 x 17; Rear tire: 170/60 x 17
- Wheelbase: 1,410 mm
- Seat height: 785 mm
- Weight: 188 kg (dry)
- Fuel capacity: 20 L (4 L)

=== Mechanics ===
The first road-going Bimota Tesi, the Tesi 1/D, was unveiled at the 1990 Cologne Motorcycle Show. Its design was entrusted to Massimo Tamburini. The bike was powered by a Ducati 851 V-twin, four-stroke engine, featuring Weber electronic fuel injection with two injectors per cylinder. It produced 102 horsepower at 9,500 rpm.

Because the suspension was highly sensitive to minor adjustments, it required high-quality shock absorbers. Marzocchi components were chosen for this role. The rake angle could be adjusted by up to 30°. Braking was provided by Brembo with two 320 mm front discs and a 230 mm rear disc. The three-spoke aluminum wheels were made by Marchesini.

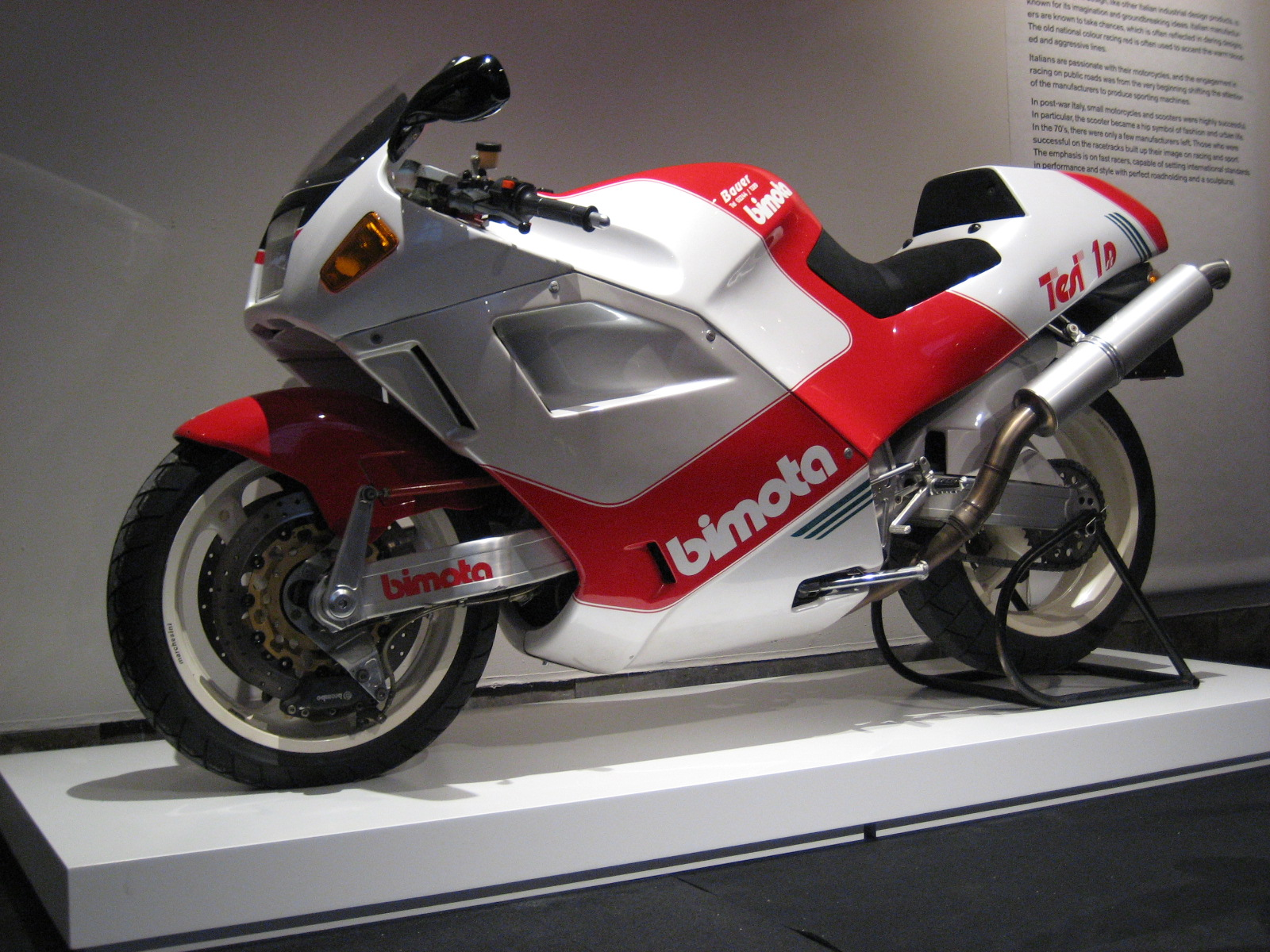
Tesi 1/D 906

A second version was released a few weeks later, featuring an increased engine displacement of 904 cm^{3}. The stroke was lengthened by 4 mm, raising power output to 113 horsepower at 8,500 rpm and giving the bike a top speed of 250 km/h. It was priced at €22,810.

Bimota produced 127 units of the 851 cm^{3} Tesi and 20 units of the 904 cm^{3} version. Nearly all were white and red with three green stripes at the bottom of the fairing. Only one was entirely red, while another, used for official photos, had more red on the fairing. In promotional brochures, these bikes were labeled Tesi 1/D 851 and Tesi 1/D 906, respectively.

=== Variants ===
==== Tesi 1/D SR ====
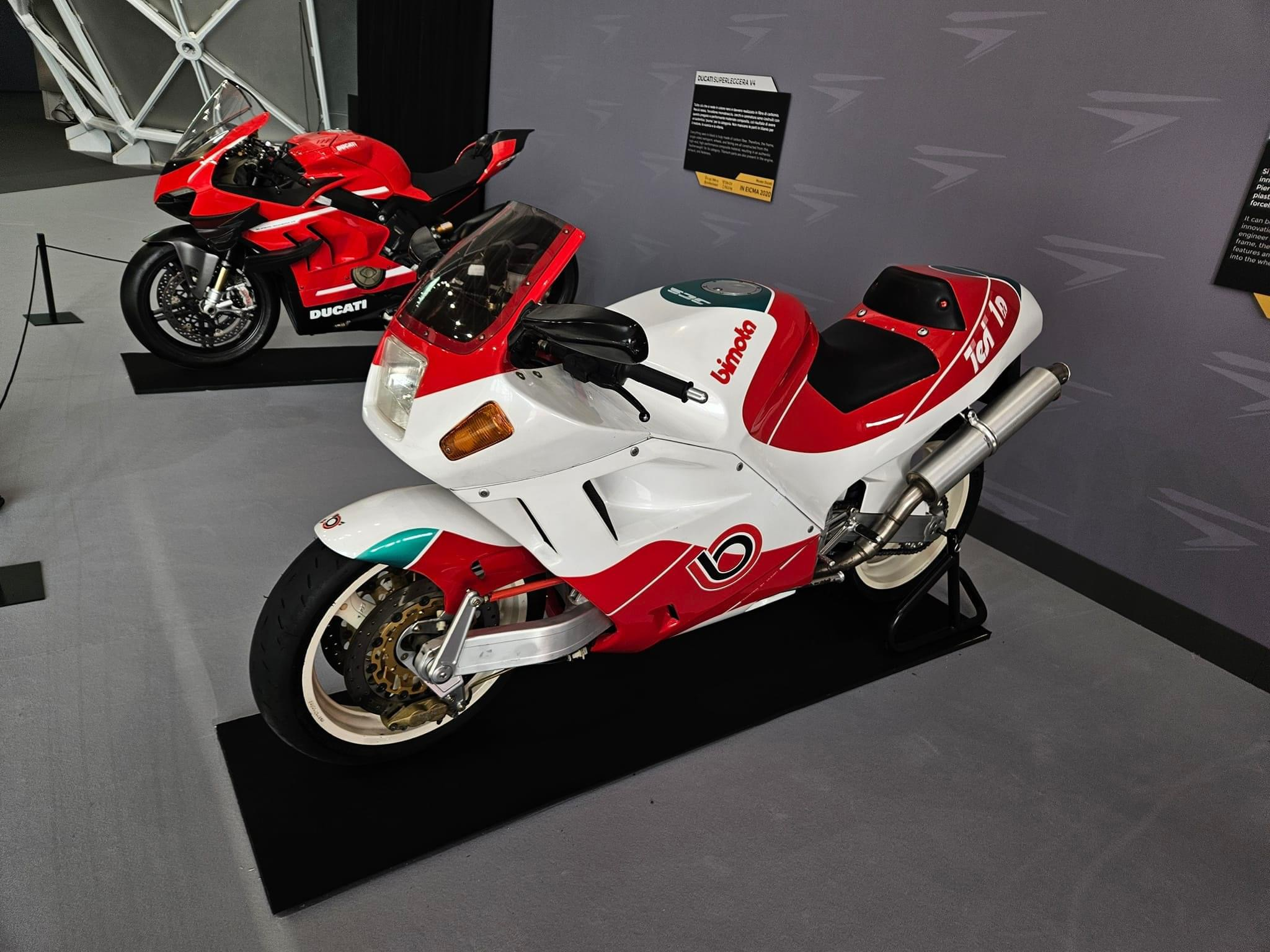
Tesi 1/D SR

In 1991, the Tesi 1/D SR replaced the original model. It retained the bored-out Ducati 851 engine but had a dry weight of 188 kg, with a 4-liter reduction in fuel tank capacity. The suspension system was upgraded to Öhlins. A total of 164 units were produced, each selling for €22,946. The color scheme changed slightly: it remained white and red, but now featured green circles on the top of the fuel tank, behind the seat, and on both sides of the front fender.

==== Tesi 1/D ES ====
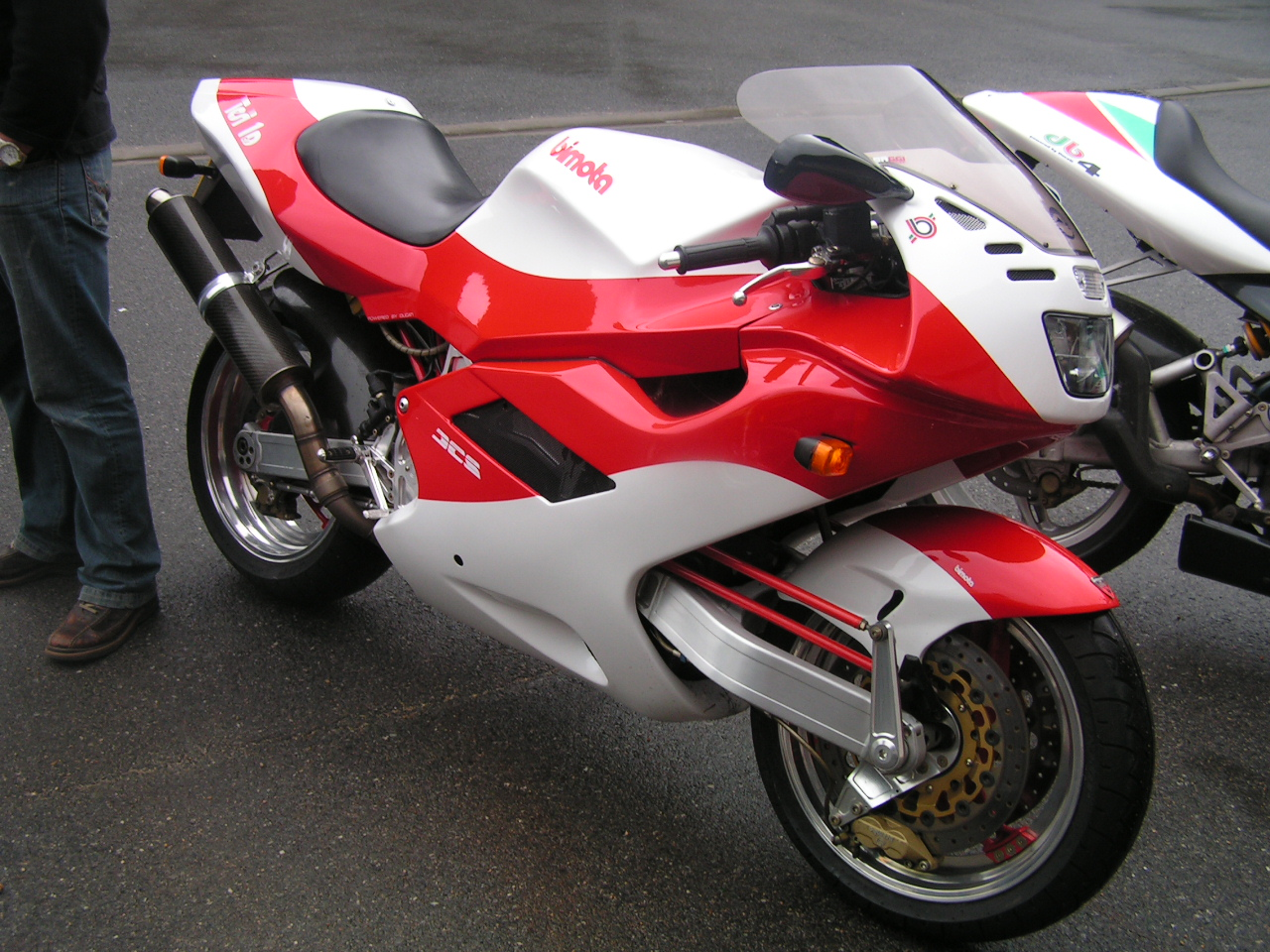
Tesi 1/D ES

To celebrate Bimota’s 20th anniversary, the Tesi 1/D ES (Edizione Speciale) was introduced at the 1992 Cologne Motorcycle Show. The design, now more fluid and refined, was created by Giorgetto Giugiaro.

Mechanically, the Tesi 1/D ES differs from its predecessors with a front swingarm machined from solid aluminum instead of being forged, as well as a front shock absorber specifically designed for the Tesi at Öhlins by a former Grand Prix rider. The Weber electronic fuel injection system was replaced by a Bimota-designed system. The engine produces 117 horsepower at 9,000 rpm, and the wheels are made by Akron.

Only 50 units were produced, each priced at €23,335.

==== Tesi 1/D EF ====
The Tesi 1/D EF (Edizione Finale, or Final Edition) was introduced at the 1994 Cologne Motor Show. This final evolution was essentially a Tesi 1/D ES, but available exclusively in an anthracite gray livery with orange pinstripes. Only 25 units were produced. The first unit was delivered to Italian journalist Giorgio Sarti, a major Bimota collector and author of a reference book on the brand. This particular model featured a semi-fairing, which exposed the two omega-shaped aluminum plates that form the Tesi’s frame, as well as the complex front suspension system. The exhaust silencer was covered in carbon fiber. It was sold for €25,265.

The last models of the Tesi 1/D ES, as well as the Tesi 1/D EF, were equipped with a final drive chain tension adjustment system using a push wheel, whereas earlier models retained the eccentric adjustment system found on the standard Tesi 1/D and Tesi 1/D SR.

All Tesi 1/D models featured the "Tesi 1D" inscription on the seat flanks. Within the "D", the specific model name was written: SR or ES. On the Tesi EF, the "D" contained the letters ES, while the Tesi 1/D 906 bore the "SR" inscription.

==== Tesi 1/D 400J ====
Japan received a special Tesi model, designed to comply with local homologation regulations. The Tesi 1/D 400J was powered by a 400cc engine derived from the Ducati 400 SS. The frame was slightly different, with a narrower omega-shaped arch due to the smaller engine size. Production lasted from 1992 to 1993, with 50 units built. The color options included red, white, and blue, and the bike featured the "Tesi 1D" monogram on the fairing sides and "400" on the seat flanks.

==== Tesi 1/D Folgore Bianca ====
In 1991, the Japanese tuner White House introduced the Tesi 1/D Folgore Bianca. This version featured a different fairing design. A total of 30 units were produced, with five based on the Tesi 1/D 400J, five on the Tesi 1/D 906, and twenty on the Tesi 1/D 851. Owners of the first two versions could choose their own color schemes, while the third version came in a pearl gray finish.

=== Competition ===
Between 1991 and 1993, the Tesi competed in the Italian and World Superbike Championships, as well as the Italian Sport Production Championship. The racing version was equipped with a 964cc engine, achieved by increasing the bore diameter by three millimeters. It produced 132 horsepower at 10,500 rpm.

The following year, Bimota entered a Tesi 500, powered by a 500cc two-stroke V-twin engine, a precursor to the V-Due. The fuel injection system was linked to an ECU, which adjusted the fuel supply based on air temperature, coolant temperature, exhaust gas temperature, and airbox pressure. Fuel was injected at the optimal moment when the exhaust port was fully closed. This engine produced 124 horsepower and was mounted on a standard Tesi frame. The rear disc brake was increased to 210mm, and the exhaust silencers were made from carbon fiber.

The bodywork was painted white, with red and turquoise blue stripes. The seat flanks bore the "Tesi 500" inscription in white, while the yellow number plates were positioned on the front fairing and seat cowl. On two of these bikes, the front fender was entirely red.

Another Tesi 500 variant featured a black-painted fairing, a yellow seat cowl with a black number 7, and a yellow upper front fairing, all accented with red flame graphics.

Originally intended to compete in the 500cc Grand Prix category, this machine only participated in a few races within the Italian Championship. By late 1992, new World Championship regulations required teams to commit to all Grand Prix events or face fines. Unable to meet these financial demands, Bimota abandoned the project.

=== Appearance in fiction ===
The Tesi 1/D appears in episodes five and six of the anime adaptation of the manga Golden Boy.

Additionally, two Tesi motorcycles are featured on the cover of Volume 10 of the Rubine comic series, titled Série Noire.

== Tesi 2/D & Vyrus 984 C³ 2V ==
Bimota Tesi 2/D
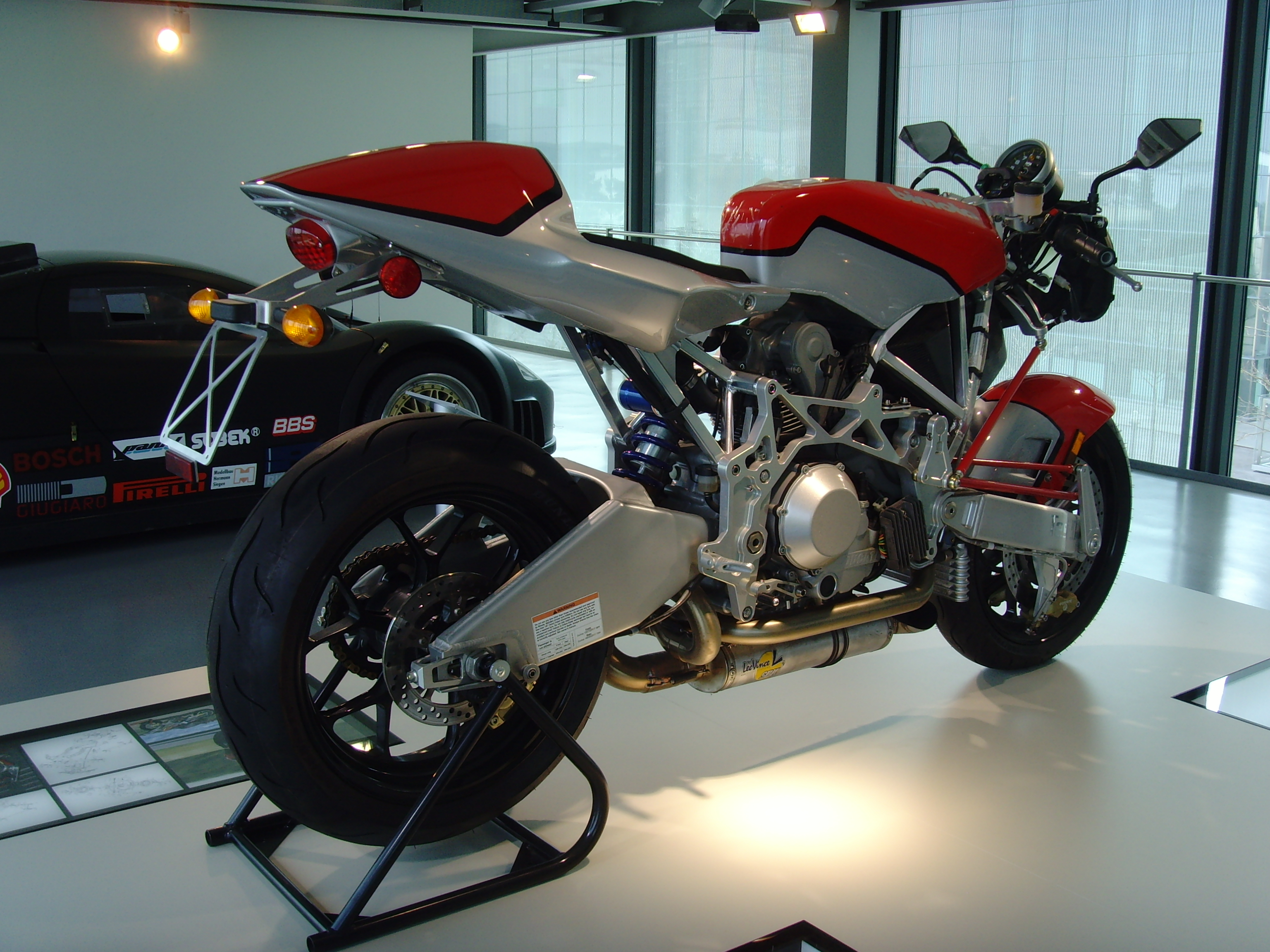
- Tesi 2/D
- Manufacturer: (Italy) Bimota
- Production: 2006 - 2009
- Class: Sports motorcycle
- Engine: 90° V-twin, 4-stroke, air and oil cooled
- Top speed: 230 km/h
- Power: 85.5 hp at 8,000 rpm
- Transmission: per chain
- Frame type: Ω-type perimeter fencing
- Suspension: Front suspension (travel) monoshock (120 mm); Rear suspension (travel) monoshock (120 mm)
- Brakes: Front brake (diameter) 2 x ∅ 320 mm discs, 4-piston calipers Rear brake (diameter) 1 x ∅ 220 mm disc, 2-piston caliper
- Tires: Front tire: 120/70 x 17; Rear tire: 180/55 x 17
- Wheelbase: 1,365 mm
- Seat height: 785 mm
- Weight: 150 kg (dry)
- Fuel capacity: 16 L (3 L)

In September 2002, Ascanio Rodorigo, who had previously worked at Bimota on a Tesi 1/D successor, founded his own racing motorcycle company, ARP (Ascanio Rodorigo Produzion). He then decided to manufacture his own Tesi.

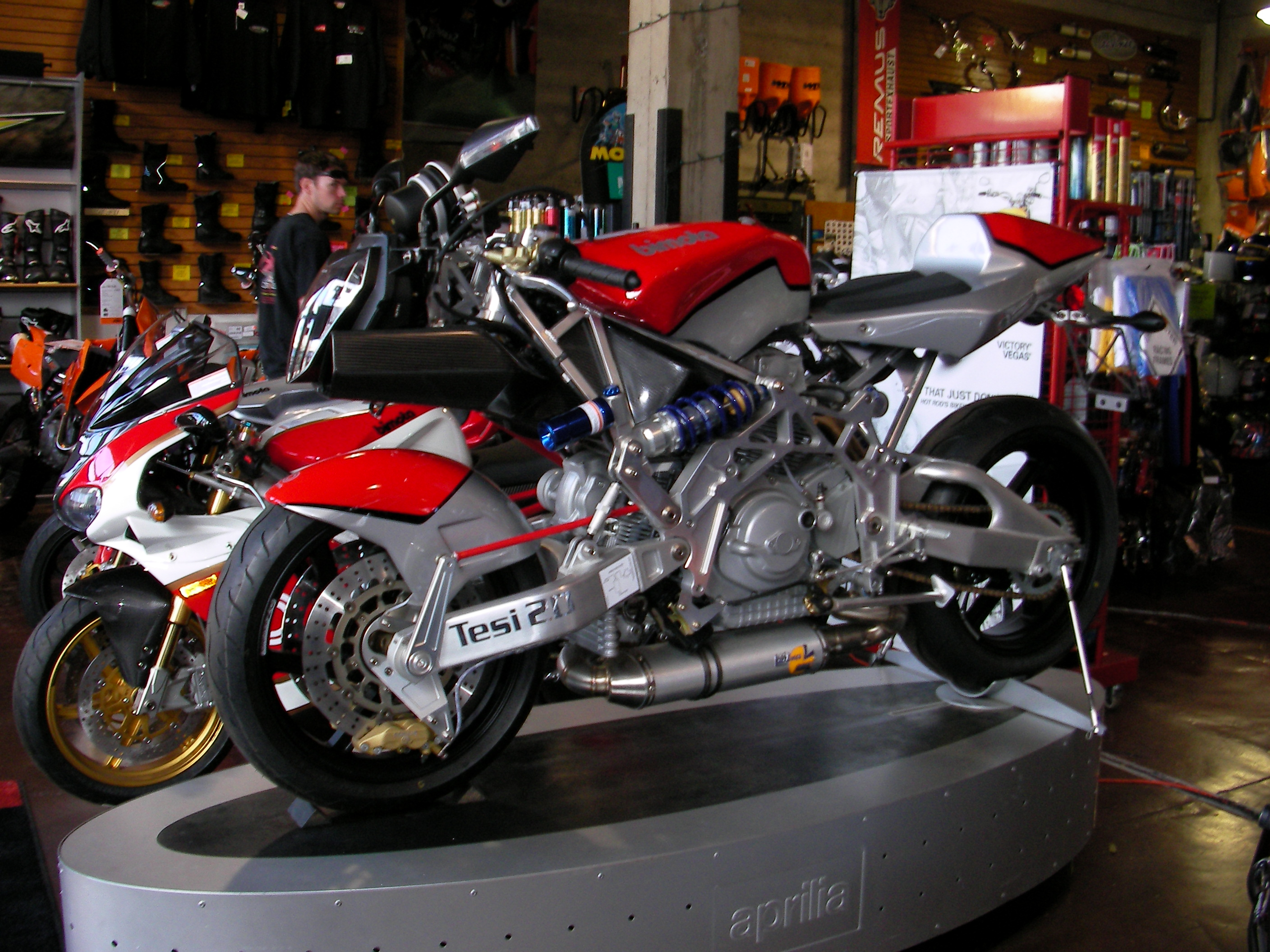
The Tesi 2/D for the United States has no bubble

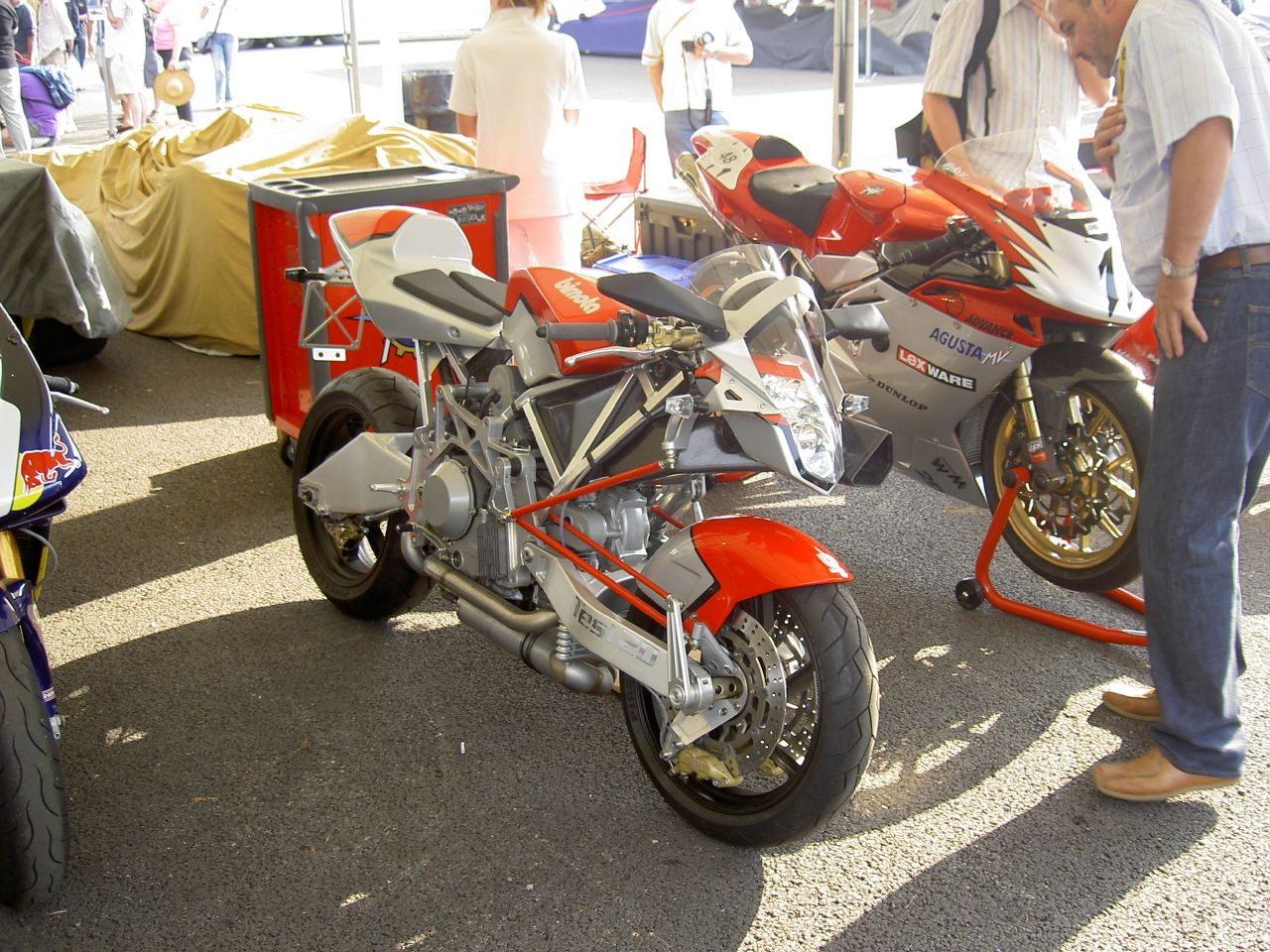
La Tesi 2/D for the rest of the world with a small windbreak

Three months later, the project was unveiled at the Padova Show. The prototype was given the name Vyrus, as its designer compared its impact on the motorcycle market to that of a virus on a computer. The company responsible for producing the bike ultimately adopted this name.

Unlike its predecessors, the new Tesi was designed without a fairing, exposing its omega-shaped aluminum frame, engine, and dual swingarms. The design was created by Sam Matthews.

=== Mechanical features ===
The steering system was significantly improved. While the first-generation Tesi was extremely sensitive to setup changes and required very stiff suspension to ensure high-speed stability, the new version offered greater comfort and more effective damping.

The Vyrus retained the 90° V-twin engine sourced from Ducati. The prototype used the Ducati 900 SS engine, but the production model was equipped with the Ducati Monster 1000 engine, producing 85.5 horsepower at 8,000 rpm and 9 kg·m of torque at 6,300 rpm.

Fuel was delivered through a 45 mm electronic fuel injection system from Microtec.

The rake angle was adjustable between 18° and 24°, altering the trail from 80 mm to 106 mm. The wheelbase measured 1,365 mm.

The suspension was supplied by FG and was adjustable for preload, rebound, and compression.

Braking was handled by two floating 320 mm discs at the front and a single 310 mm fixed disc at the rear, gripped by Brembo calipers with four pistons at the front and two at the rear. Unlike modern trends, these calipers were not radially mounted.

The dry weight was reduced to 150 kg, and the fuel tank had a 16-liter capacity, including 3 liters of reserve fuel.

The Vyrus was fitted with 120/70 × 17 front tires and 180/55 × 17 rear tires, mounted on six-spoke forged aluminum wheels.

=== Commercialization ===
In 2006, Vyrus and Bimota reached an agreement in which Vyrus would manufacture the motorcycles, while Bimota would distribute them through its sales network. This gave customers two purchasing options:

- The Bimota Tesi 2/D for €46,000
- The Vyrus 984 C³ 2V for €33,750

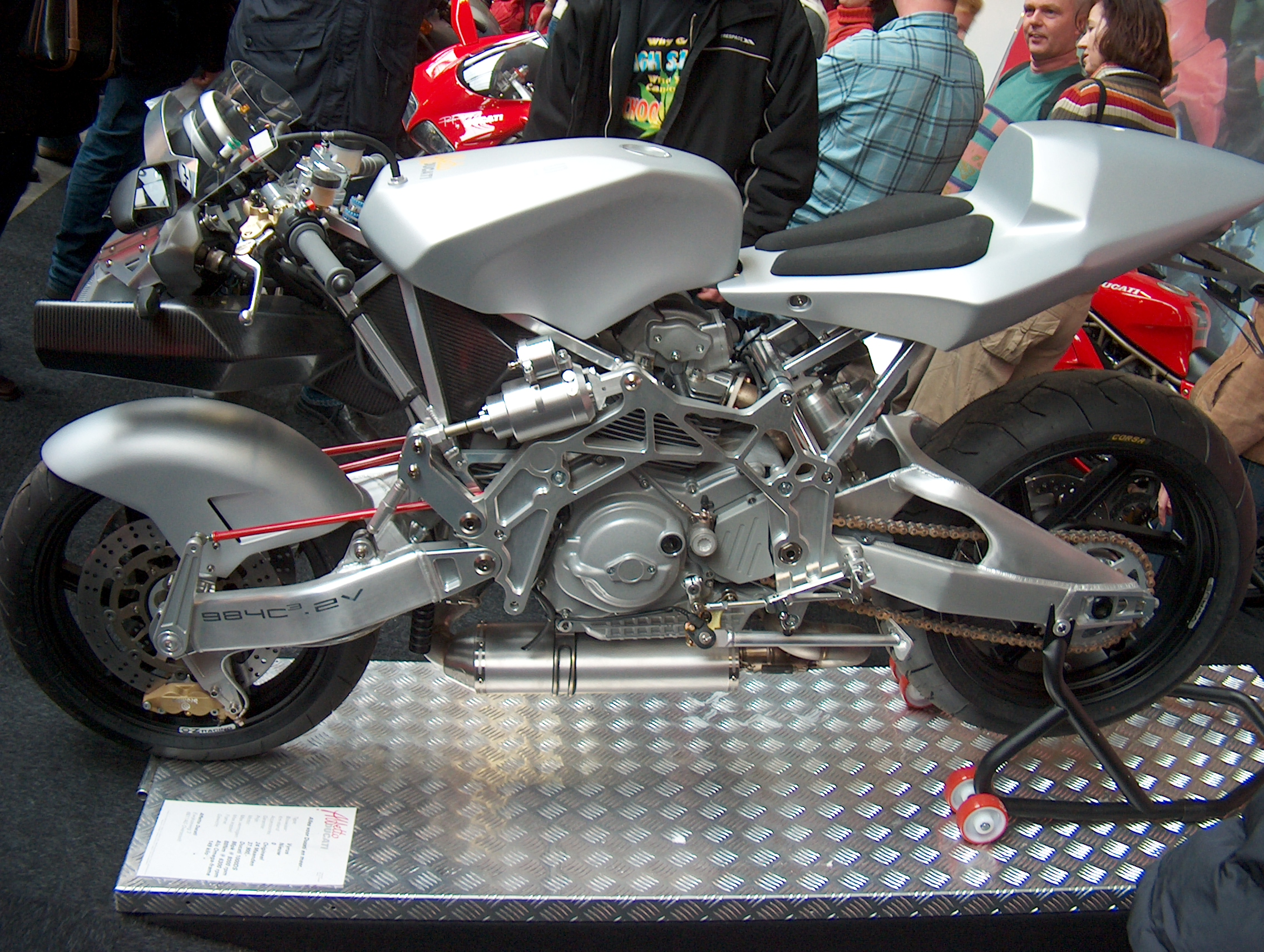
Vyrus 984 C³ 2V

The "984 C³ 2V" designation came from the original prototype, which featured a 984cc V-twin engine with two valves per cylinder.

The Tesi 2/D was discontinued in 2007 after only 25 units were produced, to avoid competing with its successor, the Tesi 3/D.

The 984 C³ 2V, limited to 100 units, was discontinued in 2009.

If the Tesi 2/D was only available in a two-tone gray and red livery with standard equipment, the Vyrus could be fully customized to order. In addition to the choice of body color (monochrome, bi- or tri-color, or clear-coated carbon fiber), it could be optionally equipped at the time of purchase with a shift light—a small LED indicating the optimal moment for the rider to shift gears.

The chassis could be fitted with forged magnesium or carbon fiber wheels. The suspension could be replaced with Double System components. The brake discs could be upgraded to petal-shaped or carbon discs. All components could be anodized, and an aluminum center stand could be installed.

On the engine side, optional features included a slipper clutch, carbon fiber belt covers, a clutch cover in magnesium or carbon fiber, an alternator cover, magnesium cylinder heads, or a traction control system.

The 984 C³ 2V could also be fitted with the seat and under-seat exhaust system from the 985 C³ 4V.

Finally, the engine could be bored out to 1,100 or 1,200 cm^{3}.

In the United States, the Tesi 2/D was homologated with a headlight and mirrors, which also housed the turn signals. In other regions, the bike featured a small windscreen, with separate mirrors and turn signals.

The last 984 C³ 2V, produced in late 2012, was called the Ultimate Edition. It featured an orange and black color scheme, a carbon fiber airbox and accessories, Öhlins suspension, carbon brake discs, and a Zard exhaust system.

== Tesi 3/D ==
Bimota Tesi 3/D
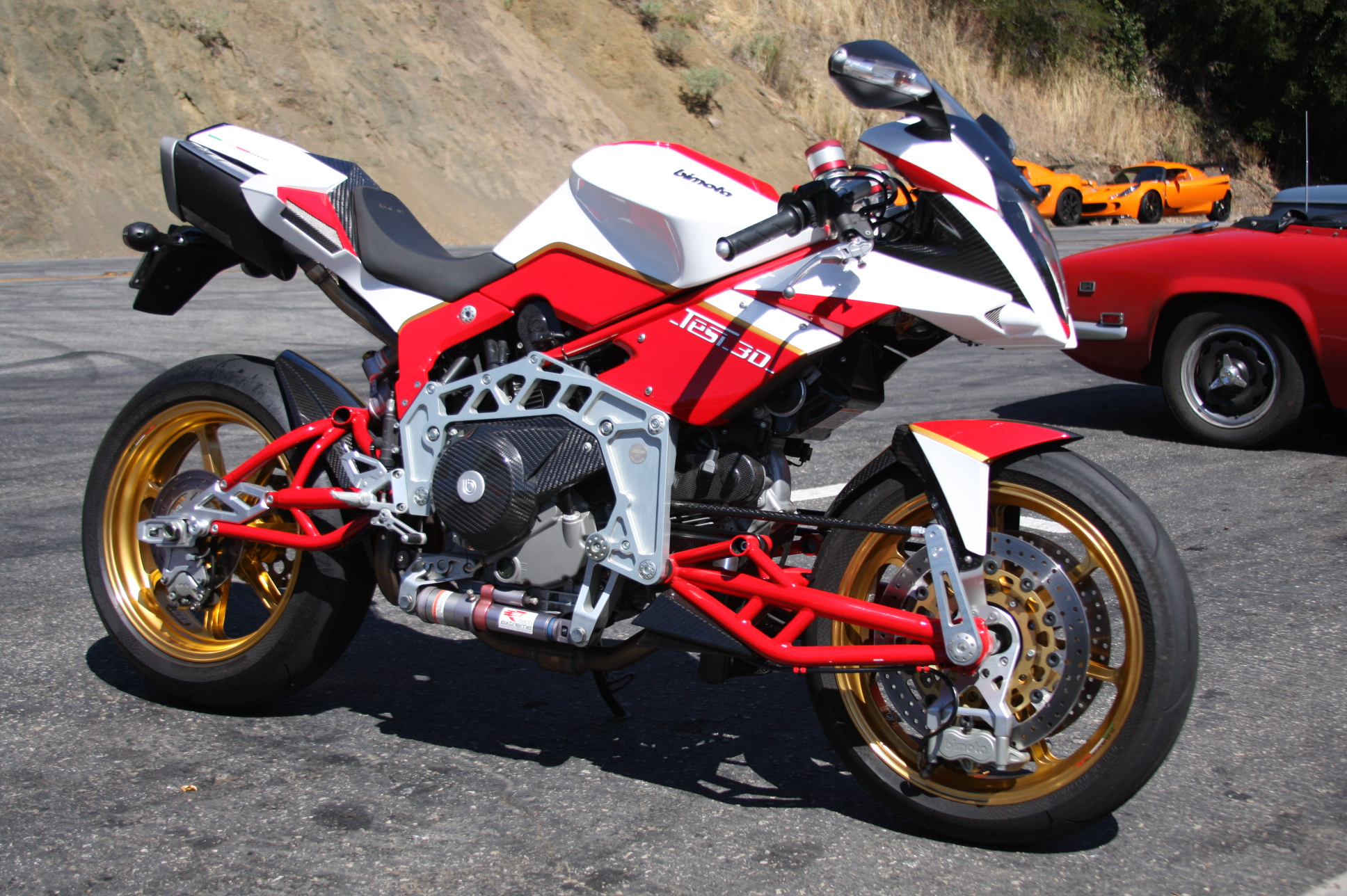
- Tesi 3/D Concept
- Manufacturer: (Italy) Bimota
- Production: 2007
- Class: Sports motorcycle
- Engine: 90° V-twin, 4-stroke, air and oil cooled
- Top speed: 220 km/h
- Power: 97 hp at 8,500 rpm
- Transmission: per chain
- Frame type: Ω-type perimeter fencing
- Suspension: Front suspension (travel) monoshock (115 mm); Rear suspension (travel) monoshock (120 mm)
- Brakes: Front brake (diameter) 2 x ∅ 320 mm discs, 4-piston calipers Rear brake (diameter) 1 x ∅ 220 mm disc, 2-piston caliper
- Tires: Front tire: 120/70 x 17; Rear tire: 180/55 x 17
- Wheelbase: 1,390 mm
- Seat height: 850 mm
- Weight: 168 kg (dry)
- Fuel capacity: 16 L (5 L)

=== Technical features ===
At the 2006 Milan Motorcycle Show, Bimota introduced the Tesi 3/D, designed by Enrico Borghesan. The most significant upgrade was the front swingarm, which was now a tubular trellis frame anchored to aluminum plates.

The bike was powered by the Ducati 1100 Multistrada engine, producing 97 horsepower at 8,500 rpm and 10.5 kg·m of torque at 4,750 rpm. Fuel delivery was handled by a 45 mm Walbro electronic fuel injection system. The manufacturer claimed a top speed of 220 km/h.

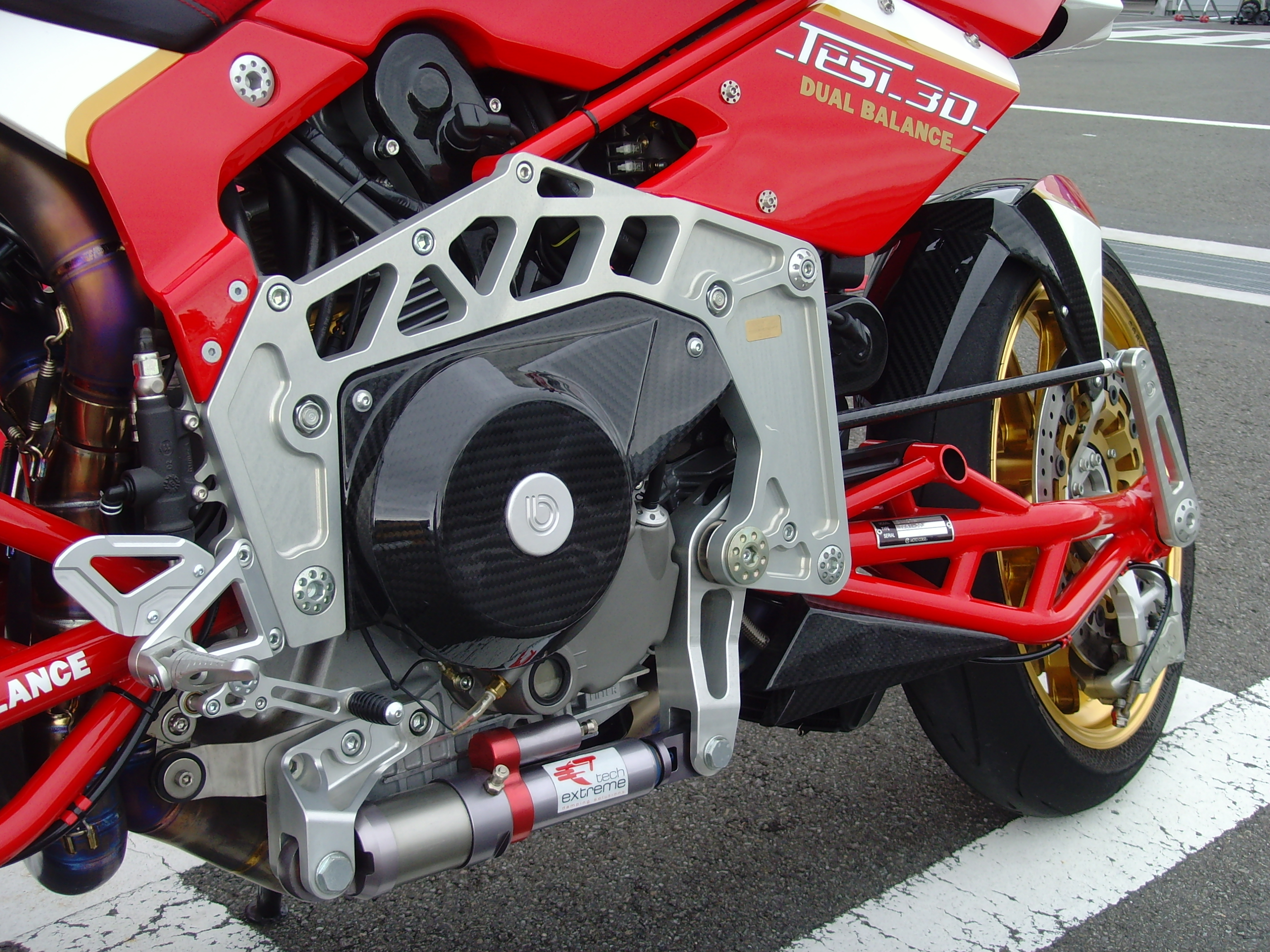
Close-up of the frame of a Tesi 3/D Concept, with the shock absorber for the front suspension in a horizontal position under the machine.

While the brake disc dimensions remained the same, the Brembo calipers were replaced with Grimeca units, which were now radially mounted at the front. The wheelbase was slightly increased to 1,387 mm.

The suspension components, adjustable for preload, rebound, and compression, were supplied by Extreme Tech. The front and rear suspension travel measured 115 mm and 130 mm, respectively. The front suspension shock absorber was relocated beneath the engine, a departure from previous designs. On the Tesi 1/D, it was centrally positioned in front of the engine, while on later models, it was placed on the left side. Unlike conventional designs, the front suspension shock absorber operated in extension rather than compression, and it contained gas instead of oil, making it lighter.

The steering system is shifted to the left side of the machine. The linkage is available in either aluminum (red) or carbon fiber (black).

The Marvic forged aluminum wheels are fitted with Continental Sport Attack tires, sized 125/70 × 17 at the front and 190/50 × 17 at the rear. They receive a gold finish. The seat height is 800 mm.

The bodywork is entirely made of carbon fiber. The triangular stainless steel exhaust silencers are positioned under the seat. The clip-on handlebars are adjustable in height and depth, while the brake pedal and gear selector are mounted on an eccentric system. This allows the machine to be adapted to the rider’s morphology.

The mirrors incorporate turn signals, and the dashboard includes a shift-light.

=== Versions ===
==== Tesi 3/D concept and standard ====
The pre-production version, called Concept, was produced in twenty-nine units in April 2007. It features a gold-plated plaque engraved with “Tesi 3D Concept” followed by the motorcycle’s serial number on the right frame plate. The models sold in Europe have a rectangular plaque, while those sold in the United States have a round plaque with the word “America” added. It was priced at €28,900.

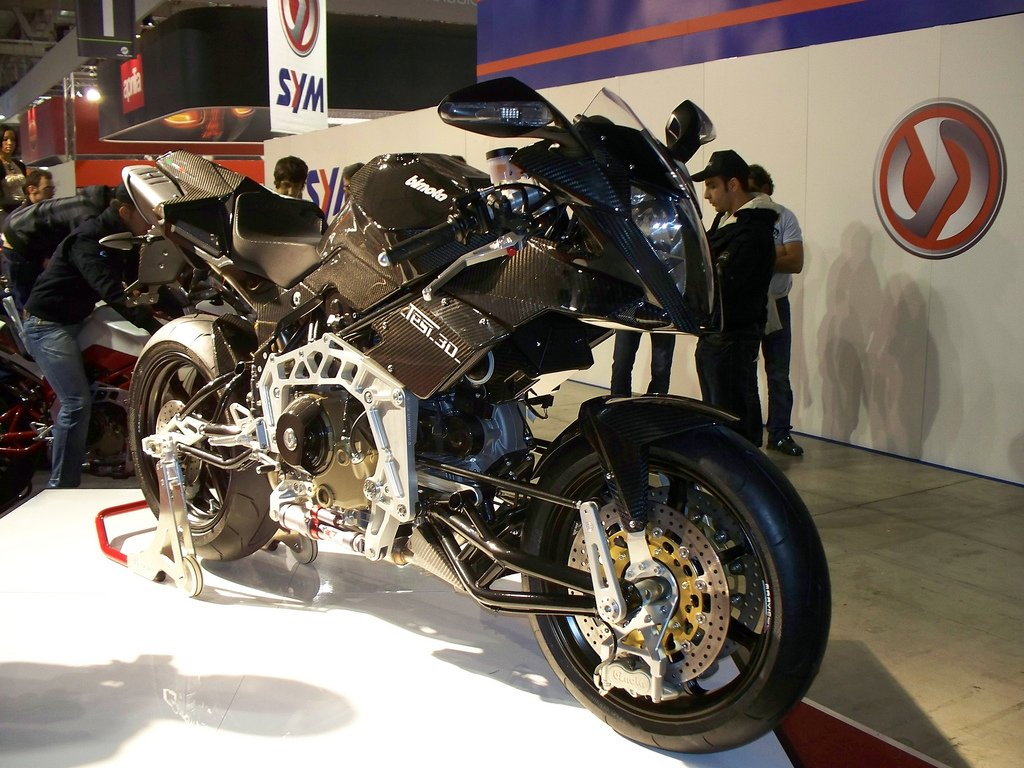
Tesi 3D Carbon Black

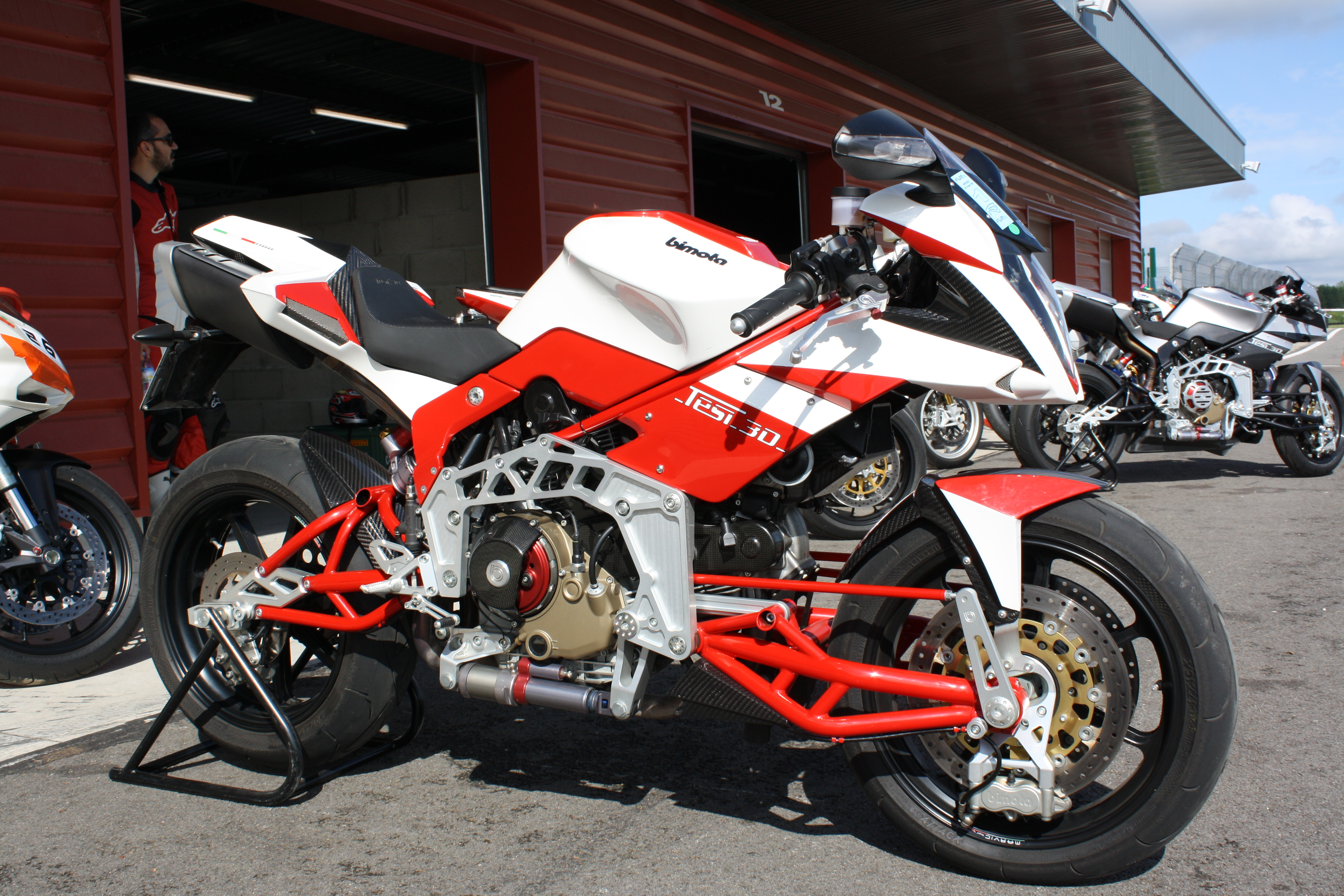
Tesi 3D Factory

A standard version was introduced at the Milan Show in November 2007.

Although the engine remains unchanged, the chassis undergoes slight modifications. The tires are adjusted to 120/70 at the front and 180/55 at the rear, still in 17-inch format.

The price decreases slightly by €600 without any apparent reason.

In terms of colors, both the Concept and standard versions come in either a two-tone pearl white and red scheme called Factory or a carbon fiber finish known as Carbon Black. The Factory paint scheme on the Concept version is highlighted with gold pinstriping at the interface between the white and red areas. It also has gold wheels, whereas the standard version features black wheels. The swingarm is red on the Concept version but may be painted black on the standard version. However, the factory can produce custom colors upon request. For example, the Swiss importer’s model is gray and black. During an exhibition of Federica Varotto’s artwork in Milan, Bimota presented a Tesi 3D Concept with a black and red paint scheme.

==== Tesi 3D Rock Gold ====
To promote a clothing collection from the luxury boutique DAAD Dantone, Bimota released the Tesi 3D Rock Gold, a one-off model. The frame is coated in black paint, while the swingarms, steering linkage, and tubular trellis supporting the front fairing are gold. The bodywork and wheels are matte black. The sides of the front fairing are marked in gold with the inscription Tesi 3D Rock Gold Daad Dantone Edition. On the fuel tank, also in gold, it reads Bimota for Daad Dantone. The edge of the seat is adorned with diamonds.

==== Tesi 3D Evo ====
At the end of 2011, Bimota upgraded the Tesi to the Tesi Evo. It inherited the engine from the Ducati Hypermotard 1100^{Evo}. Power increased to 98 hp at 7,500 rpm, with the same torque but occurring at 1,000 rpm higher.

Due to the different lower engine shape, the front mono-shock was replaced with a unit now working in compression, mounted on the right arm of the swingarm. The swingarm had to be modified. The shock absorber remains an Extreme Tech model but now contains oil.

The Tesi 3D Evo was produced in 32 units.

==== Tesi 3D Naked ====
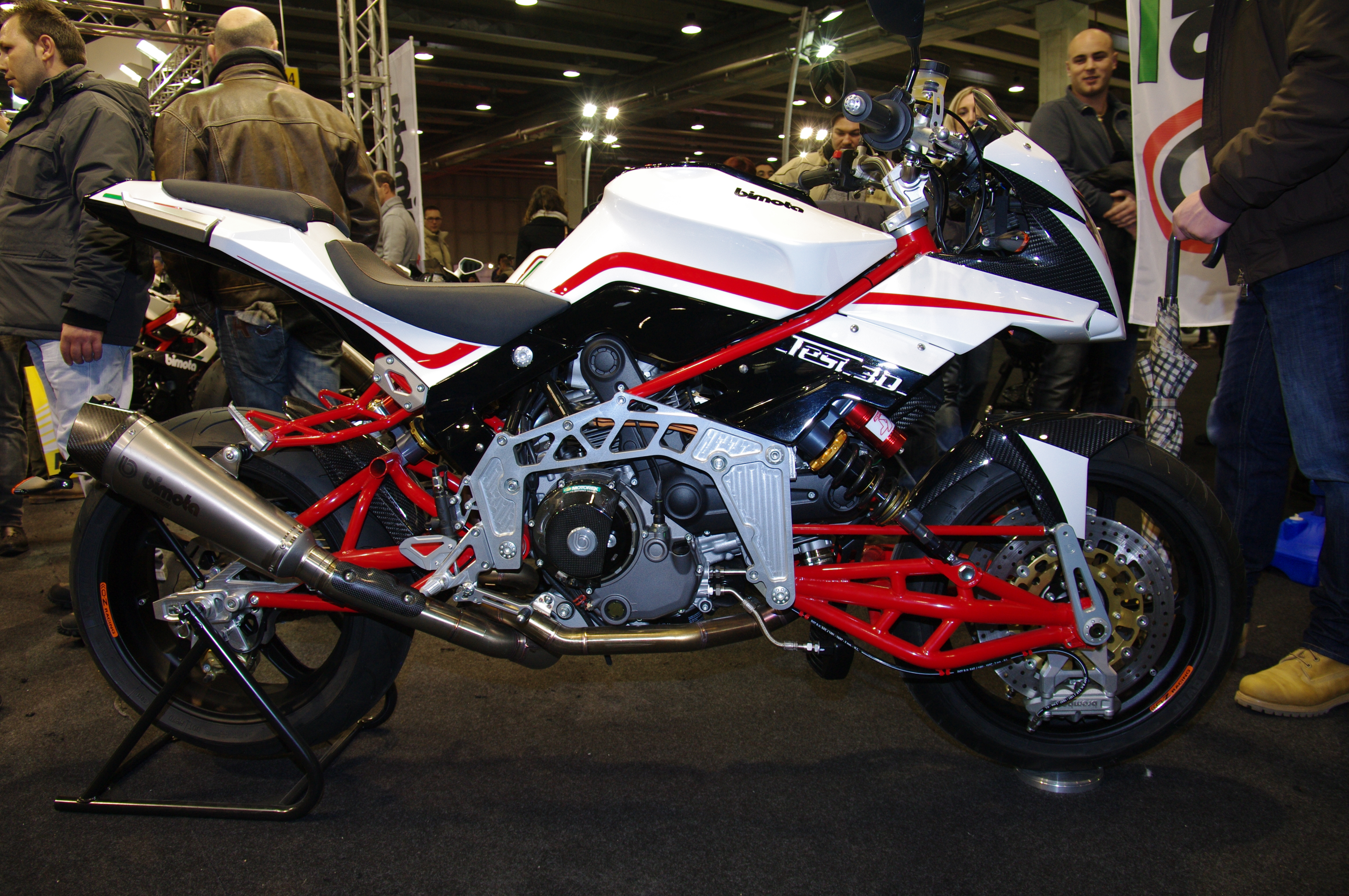
Tesi 3D Naked

At the end of 2009, the specialized press reported on a two-seater version.

The Tesi 3D Naked was the result of a project by Bimota’s chief engineer, Andrea Acquaviva, who was unable to ride the standard Tesi 3D comfortably due to its riding position. He modified his own Tesi by replacing the clip-on handlebars with a flat Accossato handlebar.

The seat was redesigned to accommodate a potential passenger. The Zard under-seat exhaust silencers were relocated to the right side and replaced with a stainless steel 2-in-1 Arrow system.

It was produced in 50 units.

==== Tesi 3D 40° ====
To celebrate the brand’s 40th anniversary, Bimota unveiled the Tesi 3D 40° at the 2013 EICMA show. Based on the Tesi 3D Naked, this limited series of 40 units features a white livery with a green and red stripe. The frame plates and wheels are black. A plaque affixed to the left plate bears the inscription: 40th Bimota anniversary Tesi 3D limited edition X/40 (where X represents the unit’s production number). Ultimately, only 18 units were produced.

==== Tesi 3D RaceCafe ====
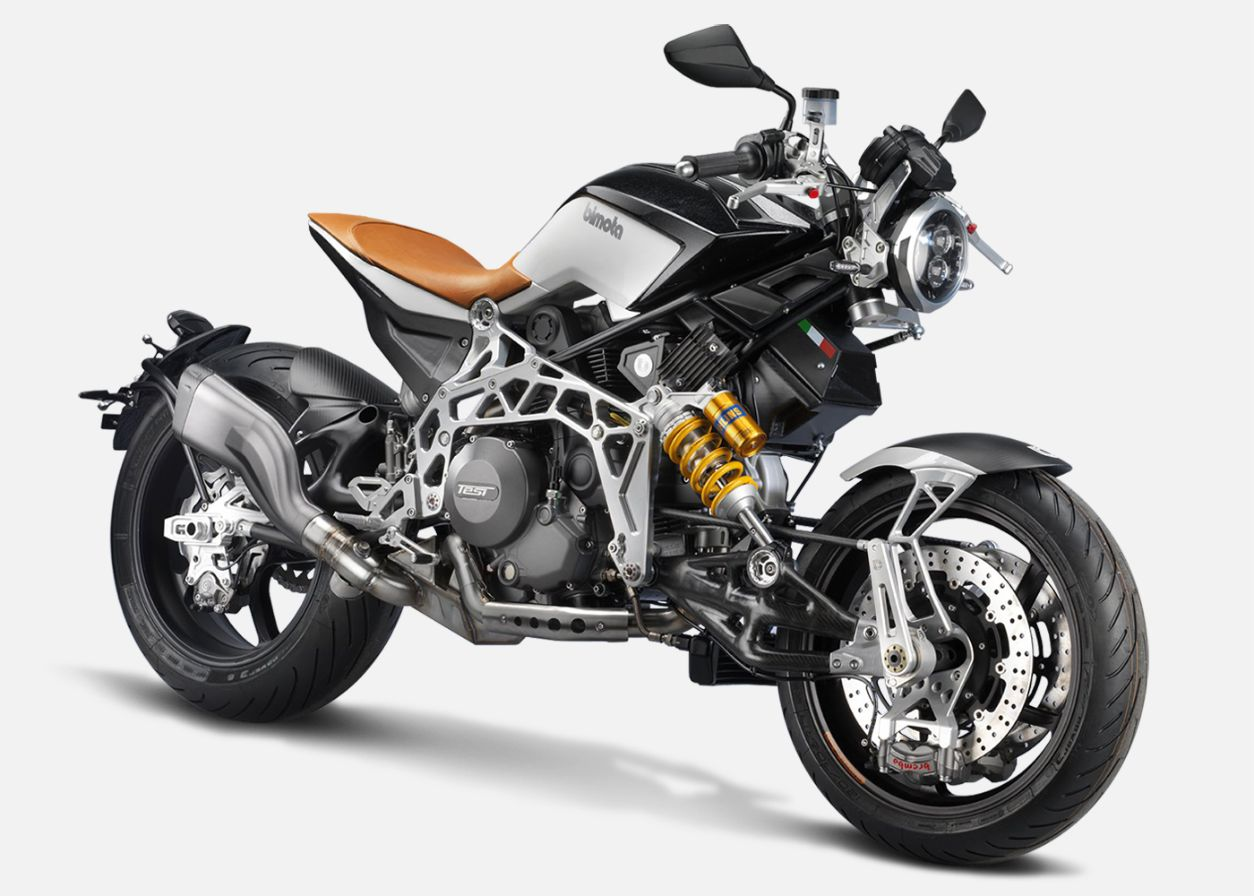
Bimota Tesi 3D RaceCafe

At the 2015 EICMA show, Bimota presented the Tesi 3D RaceCafe, a unique, one-of-a-kind model. It is powered by an 803 cm^{3} V-twin engine from Ducati’s Scrambler.

The swingarms are made of chrome-molybdenum steel but can be optionally replaced with carbon fiber components, reducing the weight from 165 kg to 162 kg.

The machine is stripped of any fairings and presented in black and aluminum, featuring an orange seat.

=== Competition ===
On 25 April 2010, Luca Pini secured first place with the Tesi 3D in the opening round of the Italian Supertwins Championship at the Mugello circuit.

== Tesi H2 ==
Bimota Tesi H2
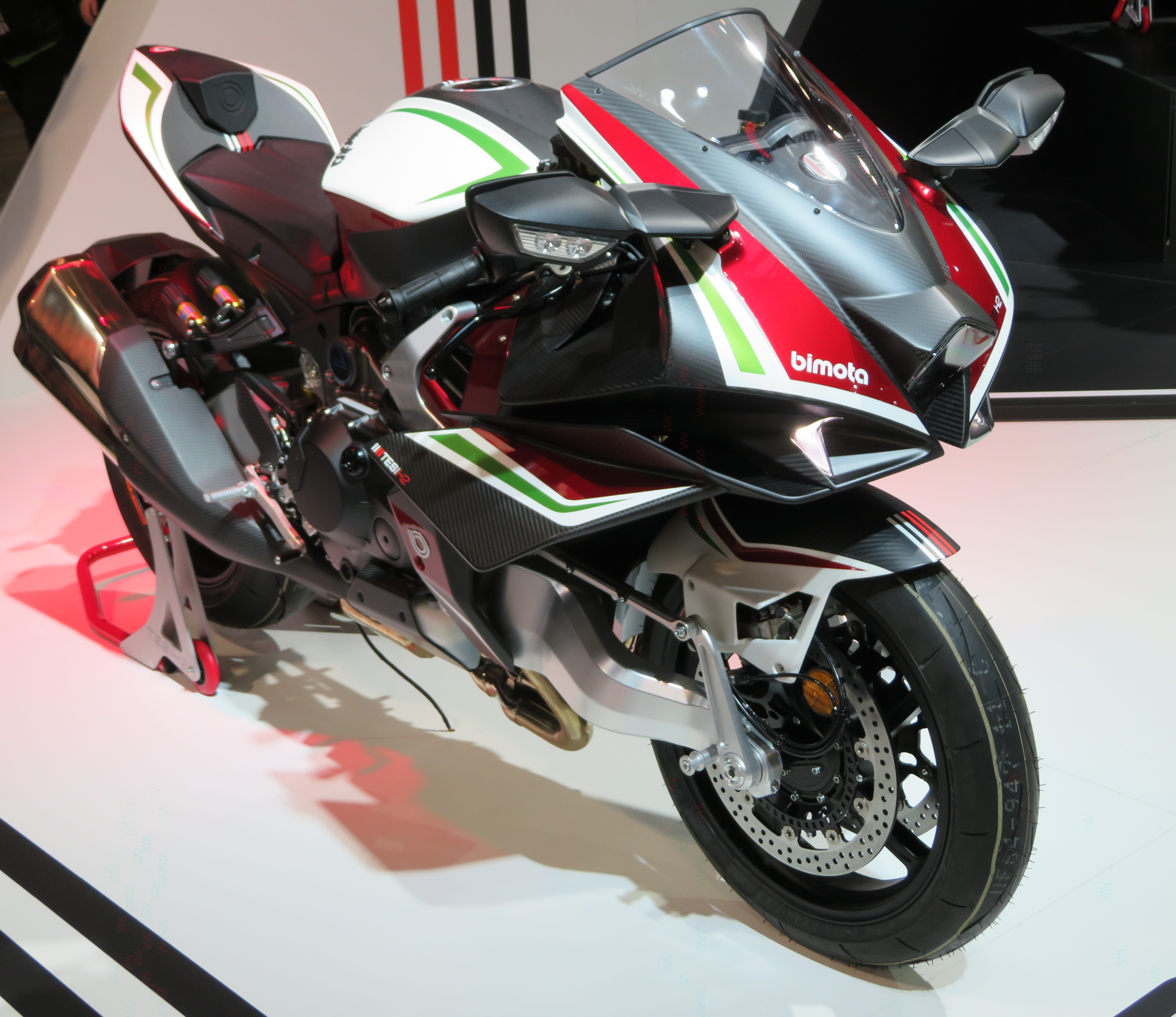
- Bimota Tesi H2
- Manufacturer: (Italy) Bimota
- Production: 2020 - present
- Class: Sports motorcycle
- Engine: 4-cylinder in-line, 4-stroke liquid cooled
- Power: 231 hp at 11,500 rpm
- Ignition type: Electric
- Frame type: Ω-type perimeter fencing
- Suspension: Front suspension (travel) single shock absorber (100 mm); Rear suspension (travel) single shock absorber (130 mm)
- Brakes: Front brake (diameter) 2 x ∅ 320 mm discs, 4-piston calipers Rear brake (diameter) 1 x ∅ 225 mm disc, 2-piston caliper
- Tires: Front tire: 120/70 x 17; Rear tire: 200/55 x 17
- Wheelbase: 1,445 mm
- Seat height: 840 mm
- Weight: 207 kg (dry)
- Fuel capacity: 17 L

=== Announcement ===
At the 2019 Milan EICMA show, Bimota announced that Kawasaki’s European branch had acquired a 49.9% stake in the company responsible for Bimota’s commercialization. The show stand also featured the prototype of the Tesi H2.

The final specifications were to be revealed in September 2020, alongside the opening of pre-orders.

=== Technical features ===
The engine is a supercharged 998 cm^{3} inline-four sourced from the Kawasaki Ninja H2. Bimota claims an output of 231 hp at 11,500 rpm, with the forced induction adding an extra 11 hp.

Suspension is handled by Öhlins, with two shock absorbers providing 100 mm of travel at the front and 130 mm at the rear. Unlike the Tesi 3D, the swingarms are no longer made of tubular trellis but cast aluminum.

Braking is provided by Brembo, featuring two 320 mm discs with radially mounted calipers at the front and a 220 mm disc at the rear, all equipped with ABS.

The dry weight is 207 kg.

The bodywork is available in a black, white, and red livery or with a clear-coated carbon fiber finish.

It is priced at €62,000.

=== Tesi H2 model overview ===
Bimota Tesi H2 models have included five variants, one for each year from 2020 to 2024, with (according to one source) the early ones having 300 hp and subsequent ones 228 hp; they have been available in increasingly varied colour lines.

Production of the H2 continued in 2026, featuring the 231 hp Kawasaki 4-cylinder engine.
