= Bimota V Due =

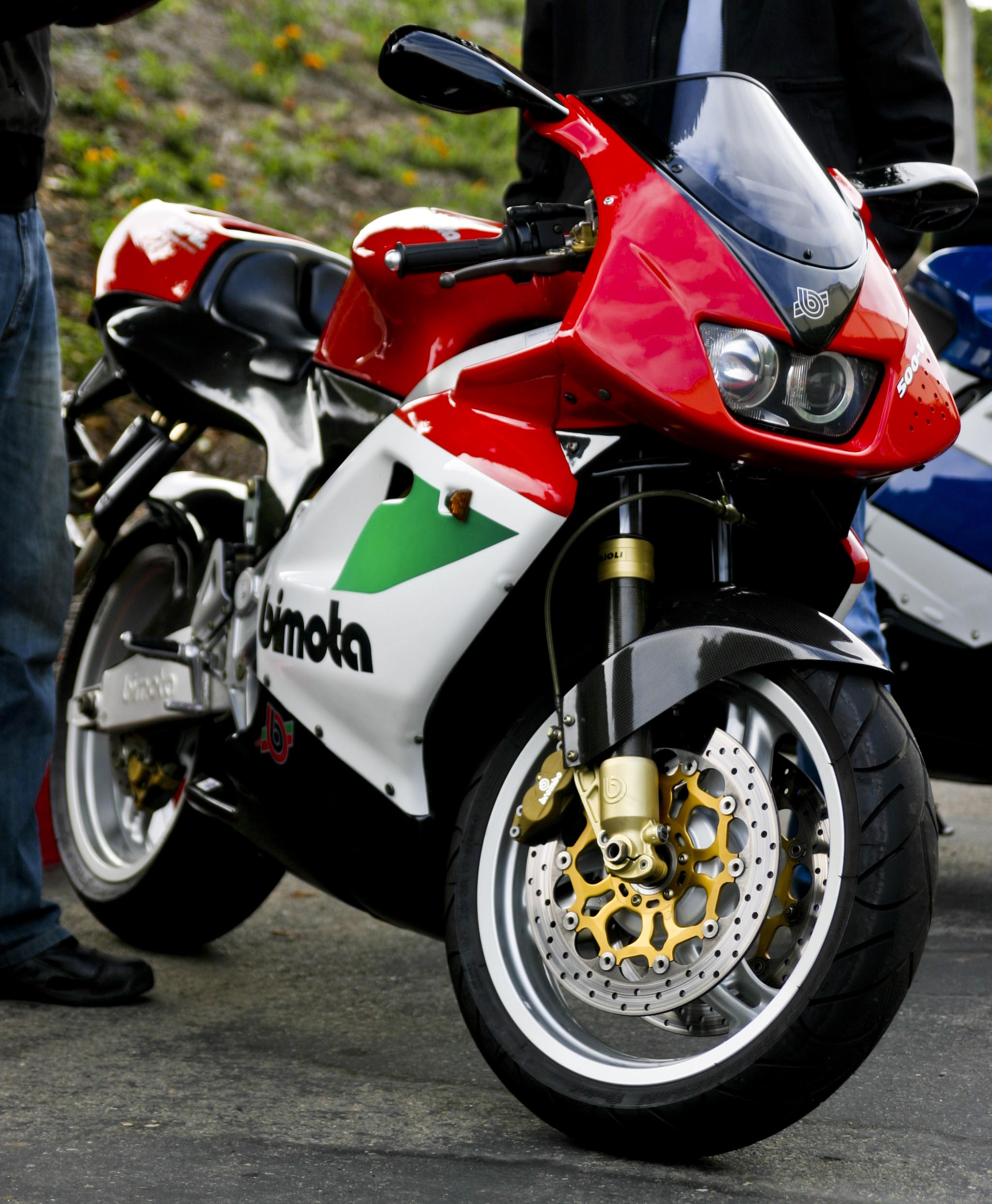
- Manufacturer: Bimota
- Parent company: Bimota
- Production: 1997 - 2005
- Class: Sport bike
- Engine: 499 cc (30.5 cu in), Liquid-cooled, two-stroke V-twin 90°
- Bore / stroke: 72.0 mm × 61.25 mm (2.835 in × 2.411 in)
- Compression ratio: 12.0:1
- Top speed: 266 km/h (165 mph)
- Power: 105 hp (78 kW) @ 9000 rpm
- Torque: 90 N⋅m (66 lbf⋅ft) @ 8000 r/min (rpm)
- Transmission: 6-speed manual Side-loading cassette-type gearbox, Hydraulically-actuated Dry Clutch
- Frame type: Oval-tubed Aluminium Twin-beam, w/ engine as stressed member, Aluminium swingarm
- Suspension: Front: Paioli Ø46 mm conventional forks, fully adjustable Rear: Ohlins monoshock, adjustable preload and damping Steering damper: Longitudinal linear
- Rake, trail: 23°, 89 millimetres (3.5 in)
- Wheelbase: 1,330 mm (52.4 in)
- Seat height: 820 mm (32.2 in)
- Weight: 377 lb (171 kg) (wet)
- Fuel capacity: 20 L (4.4 imp gal; 5.3 US gal)

The V Due was a 500cc V-twin two-stroke motorcycle first manufactured by Bimota in 1997. Technical specs included the first electronically controlled direct fuel injection on a two-stroke bike, cassette type gearbox and dry clutch. Its power-to-weight ratio surpassed almost all sports bikes of the day.

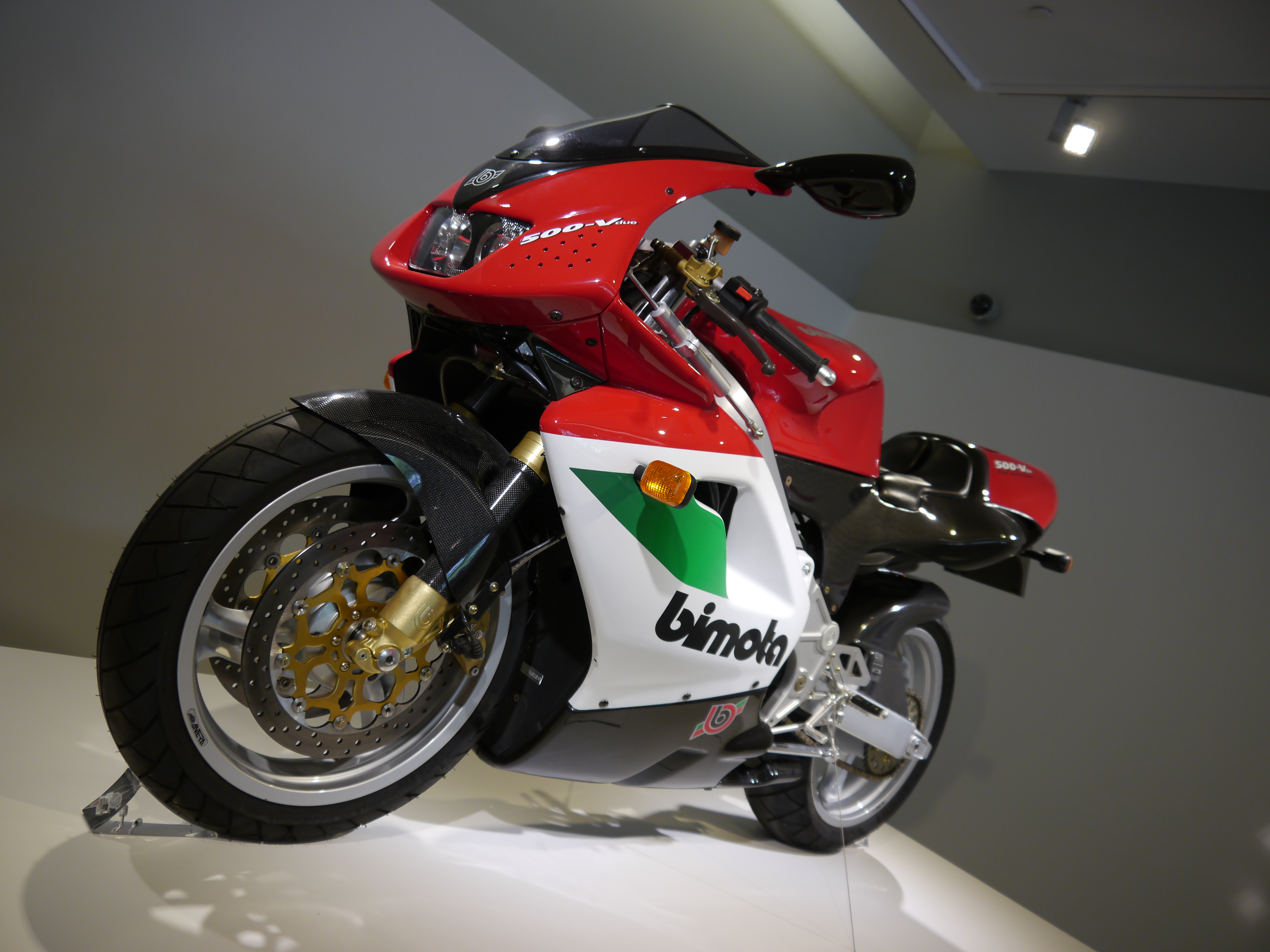
Bimota V Due

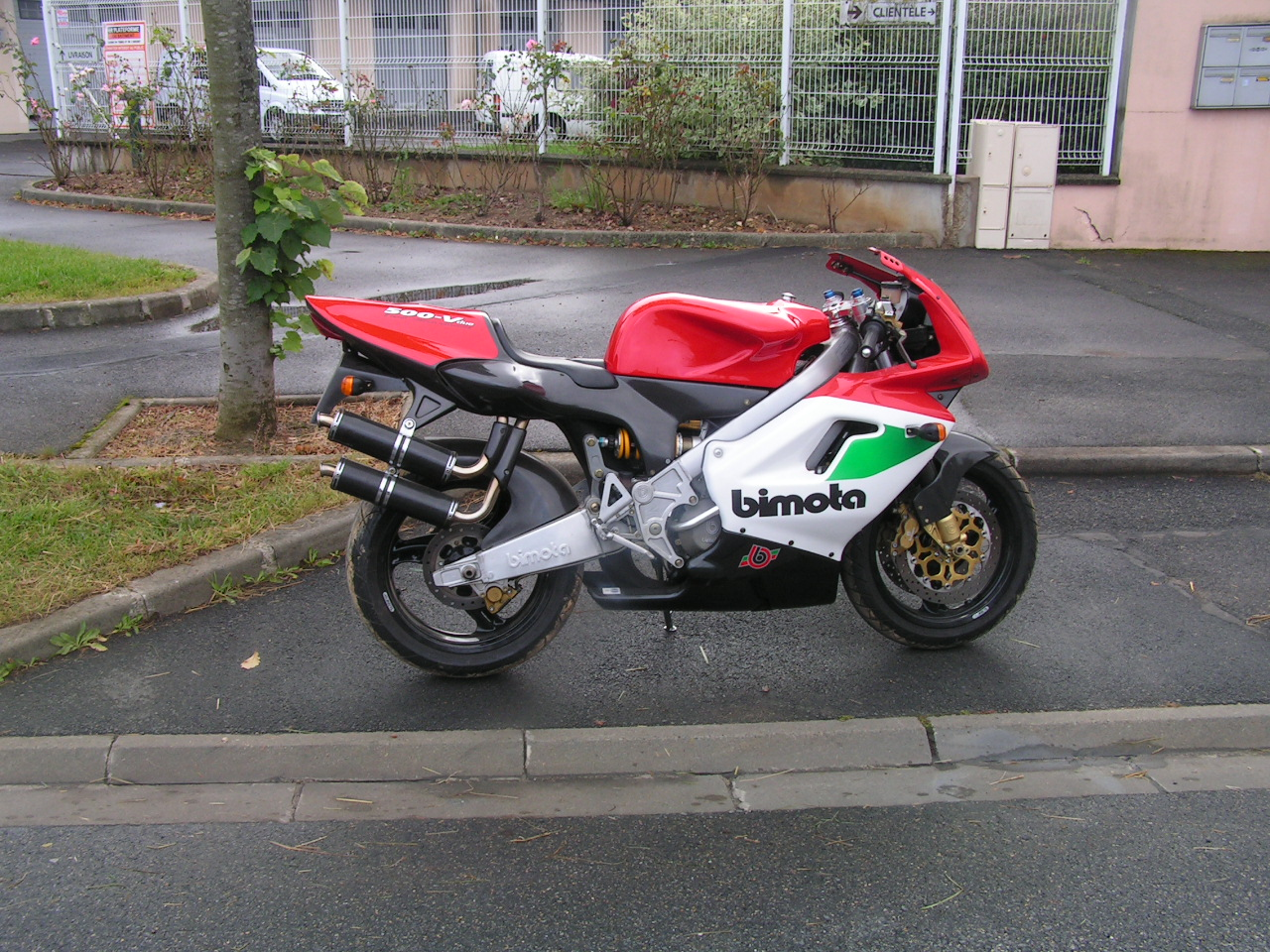
Bimota V Due

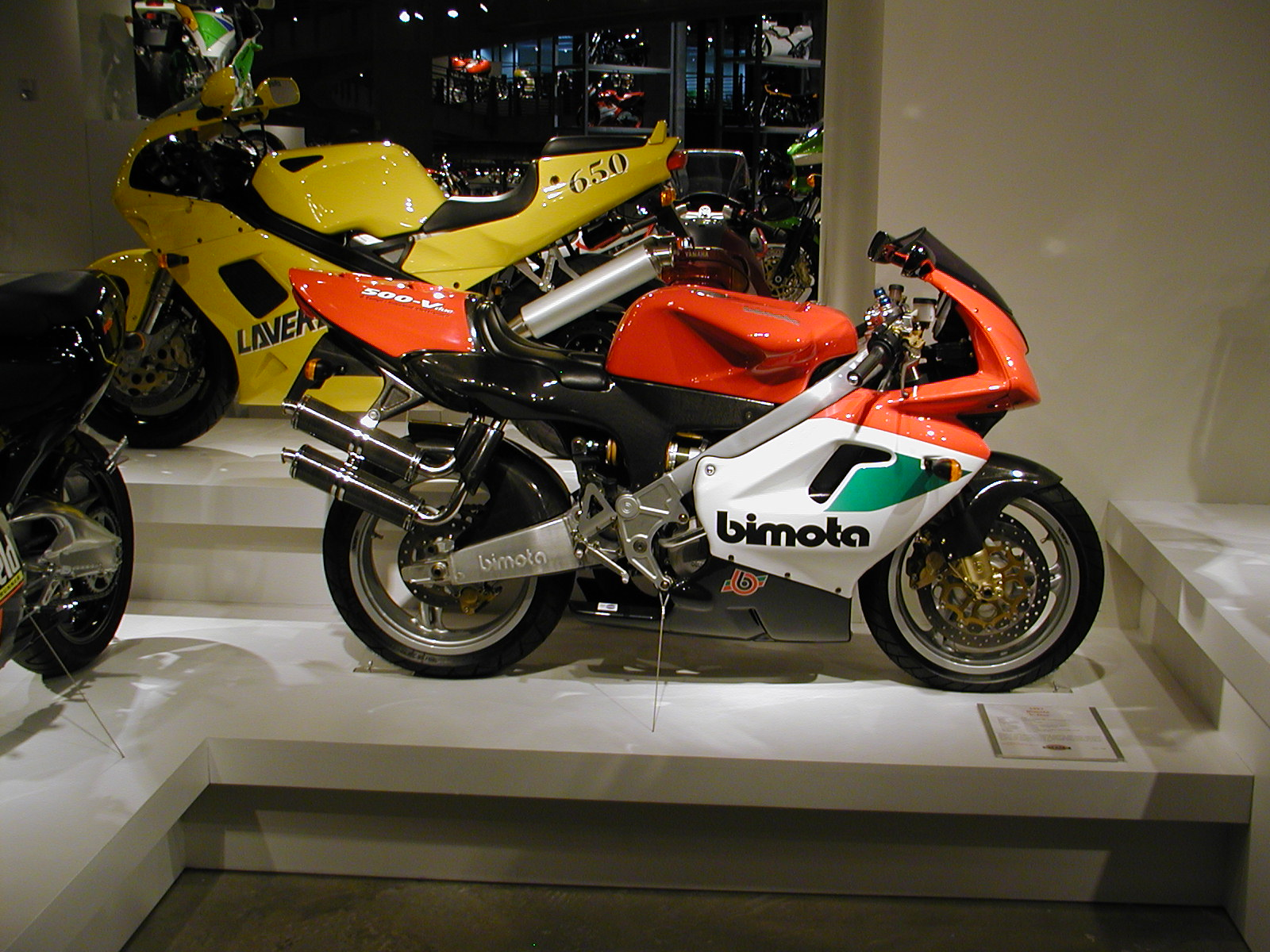
Bimota V Due - Barber museum

The first production run of 150 bikes suffered from major problems including oil leaks, seized pistons and intermittent power delivery. Many new owners simply returned their bikes at this point. In 1999 Bimota managed to fix most of the initial faults and made 26 units, all however were not road legal. In 2001 Bimota gave up with its problematic electronic fuel injection and fitted carburetors, first producing the non-road legal "Evoluzione Corsa" model of which only 14 were produced and finally the road legal "Evoluzione" model of which 120 were produced and sold. Today, due to its rarity, most V Dues are in the hands of collectors.

== See also ==
- Aprilia RSW-2 500
