= List of Benelli motorcycles =

This is a list of motorcycles produced by Benelli.

== Motorcycle Models ==
=== Pre-World War II (1919–1940) ===
Model	Engine	Years	Notes	Image
75	75cc Single-cylinder engine, Two-stroke engine	1919		
Velomotore A	98,17cc Single-cylinder engine, Two-stroke engine	1921		
Velomotore B	123,54cc Single-cylinder engine, Two-stroke engine	1921		
Motoleggera 147 Tipo Sport	147,03cc Single-cylinder engine, Two-stroke engine	1924		
Motoleggera 1 H.P. tipo A	98,17cc Single-cylinder engine, Two-stroke engine	1924		
Motoleggera 1,25 H.P. tipo B	123,54cc Single-cylinder engine, Two-stroke engine	1924		
Motoleggera 125 Tipo Sport	123,54cc Single-cylinder engine, Two-stroke engine	1925		
Bicicletta a motore Tipo Signora	123,54cc Single-cylinder engine, Two-stroke engine	1926		
175 Sport	172,08cc Single-cylinder engine, Four-stroke engine	1927		
175 Turismo	172,08cc Single-cylinder engine, Four-stroke engine	1928		
175 Extra Lusso	172,08cc Single-cylinder engine, Four-stroke engine	1929		
175 Gran Lusso	172,08cc Single-cylinder engine, Four-stroke engine	1930		
175 Sport	172,08cc Single-cylinder engine, Four-stroke engine	1931		Benelli 175 Sport (1933)
175 Gran Sport Monza	172,08cc Single-cylinder engine, Four-stroke engine	1931		
175 con carrozzino	172,08cc Single-cylinder engine, Four-stroke engine	1933		
175 Furgoncino	142,08cc Single-cylinder engine, Four-stroke engine	1933		
500 Turismo	493cc Single-cylinder engine, Four-stroke engine	1933		,
500 Sport	493cc Single-cylinder engine, Four-stroke engine	1934		
220 Turismo	215,69cc Single-cylinder engine, Four-stroke engine	1934		Benelli 220 Turismo (1934)
220 Sport	215,69cc Single-cylinder engine, Four-stroke engine	1934		
250 Turismo	246,79cc Single-cylinder engine, Four-stroke engine	1935		
250 Turismo Normale	246,79cc Single-cylinder engine, Four-stroke engine	1936		Benelli 250 TN with elastic rear suspension (1937)
500 M36 Mototriciclo	493,6cc Single-cylinder engine, Four-stroke engine	1936		Benelli 500 M36 motorcycle supplied to the Bersaglieri unit of the Royal Italian Army
250 Sport	246,79cc Single-cylinder engine, Four-stroke engine	1937		
250 M37	246,79cc Single-cylinder engine, Four-stroke engine	1937		
500 Motocarro	493cc Single-cylinder engine, Four-stroke engine	1938		
250 4TSS Monotubo	248,87cc Single-cylinder engine, Four-stroke engine	1940		
500 VTA	493cc Single-cylinder engine, Four-stroke engine	1940		
500 VLC	493cc Single-cylinder engine, Four-stroke engine	1940		
500 VLM	493cc Single-cylinder engine, Four-stroke engine	1940		
500 VLMB	493cc Single-cylinder engine, Four-stroke engine	1940		Benelli 500 two-seater motorcycle from 1942 with "side valve" engine built expressly for the Royal Italian Army for the war in the desert

=== Post-World War II ===
Model	Engine	Years	Notes	Image
65 Cougar (U.S.)				
Letizia (Mk 1,2)	98cc Single-cylinder engine, Two-stroke engine, air-cooled			Benelli Letizia 98 (1952)
125 Leoncino	123cc Single-cylinder engine, Two-stroke engine, air-cooled	1951		Benelli Leoncino 125 (1952)
125 Leoncino Normale	123cc Single-cylinder engine, Two-stroke engine, air-cooled	1952		Leoncino 125 Normale (1954)
125 Leoncino Normale 4T				
125 Leoncino Sport	123cc Single-cylinder engine, Two-stroke engine, air-cooled			
125 Leoncino Carenato	123cc Single-cylinder engine, Two-stroke engine, air-cooled	1954		Leoncino 125 Carenato (1954)
125 Leoncino Lusso	123cc Single-cylinder engine, Two-stroke engine, air-cooled	1955		Leoncino 125 Lusso (1957)
Nuovo Leoncino 125 / Cobra 125 (U.S.)	123cc Single-cylinder engine, Two-stroke engine, air-cooled			Benelli 125 Cobra
250 Barracuda	245cc Horizontal single-cylinder engine, Four-stroke engine, OHV, air-cooled	1967-1970		
Mojave 260/360	single-cylinder engine, Four-stroke engine, OHV, air-cooled	1967-1969		Benelli Mojave 260
125 Sport Special	123,6cc Horizontal single-cylinder engine, Four-stroke engine, air-cooled	1968-1973		
250 Sport Special	245cc Single-cylinder engine, Four-stroke engine, OHV, air-cooled	1968-1973		Benelli 250 Sport Special MK III 1971
650 Tornado (Mk 1, S, S2)	642,8cc Straight-twin engine, Four-stroke engine, OHV, 2-valves, air-cooled	1971-1975		Benelli Tornado 650 S 1972
175 Enduro	169,65cc Single-cylinder engine, Two-stroke engine, air-cooled	1972		
125 Panther	125cc Single-cylinder engine, Two-stroke engine, air-cooled	1974		
250 2C	231,4cc Straight-twin engine, Two-stroke engine, air-cooled	1973 - 1988		Benelli 250 TS
250 Quattro	231,4cc Straight-four engine, Four-stroke engine, OHV, air-cooled	1975		
500 LS	500cc Straight-four engine, Four-stroke engine	1975-1980		
750 Sei	747cc Straight-six engine, Four-stroke engine	1975-1980		Benelli 750 Sei
125 2C	125cc Straight-twin engine, Two-stroke engine, air-cooled	1979		
354	350cc Straight-four engine, Four-stroke engine	1979-1980		
125 Turismo		1980		
125 Enduro		1980		
254	231,4cc Straight-four engine, Four-stroke engine, OHV, air-cooled	1981-1984		Benelli 254
124	123,57cc Straight-twin engine, Four-stroke engine	1982-1995		
304	231,4cc Straight-four engine, Four-stroke engine, OHV, air-cooled	1983-1993		Benelli 304
350 RS				
354 Sport	350cc Straight-four engine, Four-stroke engine	1980-1981		
354 Sport 2C	350cc Straight-four engine, Four-stroke engine	1980-1985		
500 Quattro (Mk 1,2)	500cc Straight-four engine, Four-stroke engine			Benelli 500 Quattro (Mk1)
504	500cc Straight-four engine, Four-stroke engine			
504 Sport	500cc Straight-four engine, Four-stroke engine			Benelli 504 Sport (1979)
654 T	600cc Straight-four engine, Four-stroke engine	1981-1985		
654 Sport	600cc Straight-four engine, Four-stroke engine	1982-1985		
900 Sei (Mk 1 to 4)	906cc Straight-six engine, Four-stroke engine	1985-1992		Benelli 900 Sei in Barber Vintage Motorsports Museum
S 125		1984		
125 BX		1987		
125 Jarno		1988		
125 BKX		1989		

=== Post De-Tomaso Era Bikes ===
Model	Engine	Years	Notes	Image
Tornado Tre 900	898cc, Inline-triple engine, Four-stroke engine, DOHC, 4-valves, liquid cooling	(2003–2006)		Tornado Tre 900 (2003)
Tornado Tre 1130	1130cc, Inline-triple engine, Four-stroke engine, DOHC, 4-valves, liquid cooling	(2006–2010)		
Tornado Tre 900 RS	898cc, Inline-triple engine, Four-stroke engine, DOHC, 4-valves, liquid cooling	(2004–2006)		Tornado Tre 900 RS
Tornado Tre 900 LE	898cc, Inline-triple engine, Four-stroke engine, DOHC, 4-valves, liquid cooling	(2000–2005)		2001 Tornado Tre 900 LE
TNT 899	898cc, Inline-triple engine, Four-stroke engine, DOHC, 4-valves, liquid cooling	(2008–2016)		TNT 899
TNT 899 S	898cc, Inline-triple engine, Four-stroke engine, DOHC, 4-valves, liquid cooling	(2008–2011)		TNT 899 S
TNT 1130	1130cc, Inline-triple engine, Four-stroke engine, DOHC, 4-valves, liquid cooling	(2004–2008)		
TNT 899/1130 Cafe Racer	898/1130cc, Inline-triple engine, Four-stroke engine, DOHC, 4-valves, liquid cooling			Benelli TNT Cafè Racer 1130cc 2004
TNT 899/1130 Century Racer	898/1130cc, Inline-triple engine, Four-stroke engine, DOHC, 4-valves, liquid cooling	(2011–2013)		Benelli TNT Century Racer
TNT 1130 Sport	1130cc, Inline-triple engine, Four-stroke engine, DOHC, 4-valves, liquid cooling	(2005–2007)		Benelli Tnt 1130cc Sport
TNT 1130 Sport Evo	1130cc, Inline-triple engine, Four-stroke engine, DOHC, 4-valves, liquid cooling	(2007–2010)		
TNT Titanium	1130cc, Inline-triple engine, Four-stroke engine, DOHC, 4-valves, liquid cooling	(2005–2011)		Benelli TNT Titanium 1130 cc 2008
TNT R160	1130cc, Inline-triple engine, Four-stroke engine, DOHC, 4-valves, liquid cooling	(2010–2012)		
TNT R	1130cc, Inline-triple engine, Four-stroke engine, DOHC, 4-valves, liquid cooling	(2012–2017)		Benelli TNT R
Tre 899 K	898cc, Inline-triple engine, Four-stroke engine, DOHC, 4-valves, liquid cooling	(2009–2011)		
Tre 1130 K	1130cc, Inline-triple engine, Four-stroke engine, DOHC, 4-valves, liquid cooling	(2006–2017)		Benelli Tre-K 1130 (2011)
Tre 1130 K Amazonas	1130cc, Inline-triple engine, Four-stroke engine, DOHC, 4-valves, liquid cooling	(2007–2017)		Benelli Tre-K 1130 Amazonas (2011)
BN 600 R	600cc, Straight-four engine, Four-stroke engine, DOHC, 4-valves, liquid cooling	(2013–2016)		
BN 600i	600cc, Straight-four engine, Four-stroke engine, DOHC, 4-valves, liquid cooling	(2012–2016)		
BN 600 GT	600cc, Straight-four engine, Four-stroke engine, DOHC, 4-valves, liquid cooling	(2013–2018)		
BN 125	125cc, Single-cylinder engine, Four-stroke engine, liquid cooling	(2018–present)		BN 125 (2020)
BN 251	249,2cc, Single-cylinder engine, Four-stroke engine	(2015–2020)		
302R	300cc, Straight-twin engine, Four-stroke engine, DOHC, 4-valves, liquid cooling	(2017–2020)		302R
BN 302	300cc, Straight-twin engine, Four-stroke engine, DOHC, 4-valves, liquid cooling	(2014–2019)		BN 302
TNT 302 S	300cc, Straight-twin engine, Four-stroke engine	(2019–2020)		
TNT 125 T				TNT 125 T (2016)
TNT 300				TNT 300 (2016)
UNO C 150				
UNO C 250				
TNT 135				
TNT 15				
TNT 150i				
TNT 25	249cc			Benelli TNT 25
TNT 249S	250cc Straight-twin engine, Four-stroke engine	(2019–2020)		
Adiva			(Benelli relationship with this company now ended)	
Velvet 125/150/250/400				Benelli Velvet
Caffénero 125/150/250				
Zenzero 350				
X 125/150				
Macis 125/150				Benelli Macis 125 (2011)
Seta 125				
150s				
180s				
Imperiale 400				
502C				Benelli 502C
752S				Benelli 702S
Tornado 550				Benelli Tornado 550
Leoncino Bobber 400				Benelli Leoncino Bobber 400
BKX 125				Benelli BKX 125
BKX 125S				Benelli BKX 125S
TRK 502 X				
TRK 702				
TRK 702 X				
TNT 550				Benelli TNT 550

== Minicycle Models ==
Model	Engine	Years	Notes	Image
Buzzer	49–65 cc			
City Bike				
Dynamo (Various Models)	49–65 cc			
Fireball				
Hurricane				
Volcano	180 cc			
Mini Enduro	65 cc			

== Moped Models ==
Model	Engine	Years	Notes	Image
50 Cross	49cc Single-cylinder engine, Two-stroke engine			
50 Magnum	49cc Single-cylinder engine, Two-stroke engine			
50 Turismo (T50)	49cc Single-cylinder engine, Two-stroke engine			Benelli T50 (1977)
America				
Bobo				
California				
Devil 50				
E3				
Export 3V-K; Export 3V-P; Export FA				
Fireball				
G2 Pedals; G2 Elle; G2 KS				Benelli G2 Elle
Gentlemen				
Gran Turismo				
GTV 50				
K2				
S50				
Scooter GL				
Seta 50				
Sport				
Super Sport				
Special				
Sport Special				
Spring Lasting 50				
Sprint				
Sprint 3V				
Sprint 3V (Sport)				
Sprint 4V				
Trial				
Laser				Benelli Laser 50
Luxury				
Luxury Export				
Motorella				Benelli Motorella
Pepe 50 Classic				
Pepe 50 LX			(Also known as Andretti M50 in United States)	Benelli Pepe LX
491; 491 Army Edition; 491 Sport; 491 GT; 491 Racing; 491 RR; 491 ST; 491 RR-GP; 491 ST-GP	49cc Single-cylinder engine, Two-stroke engine	(1997–2003)		491 Army Edition
49X	49cc Single-cylinder engine, Two-stroke engine		'Offroad' and 'Onroad' (Also Known as the Quattronovex 50)	

== See also ==
- List of Bimota motorcycles
- List of Moto Guzzi motorcycles
