= Benelli T50 =

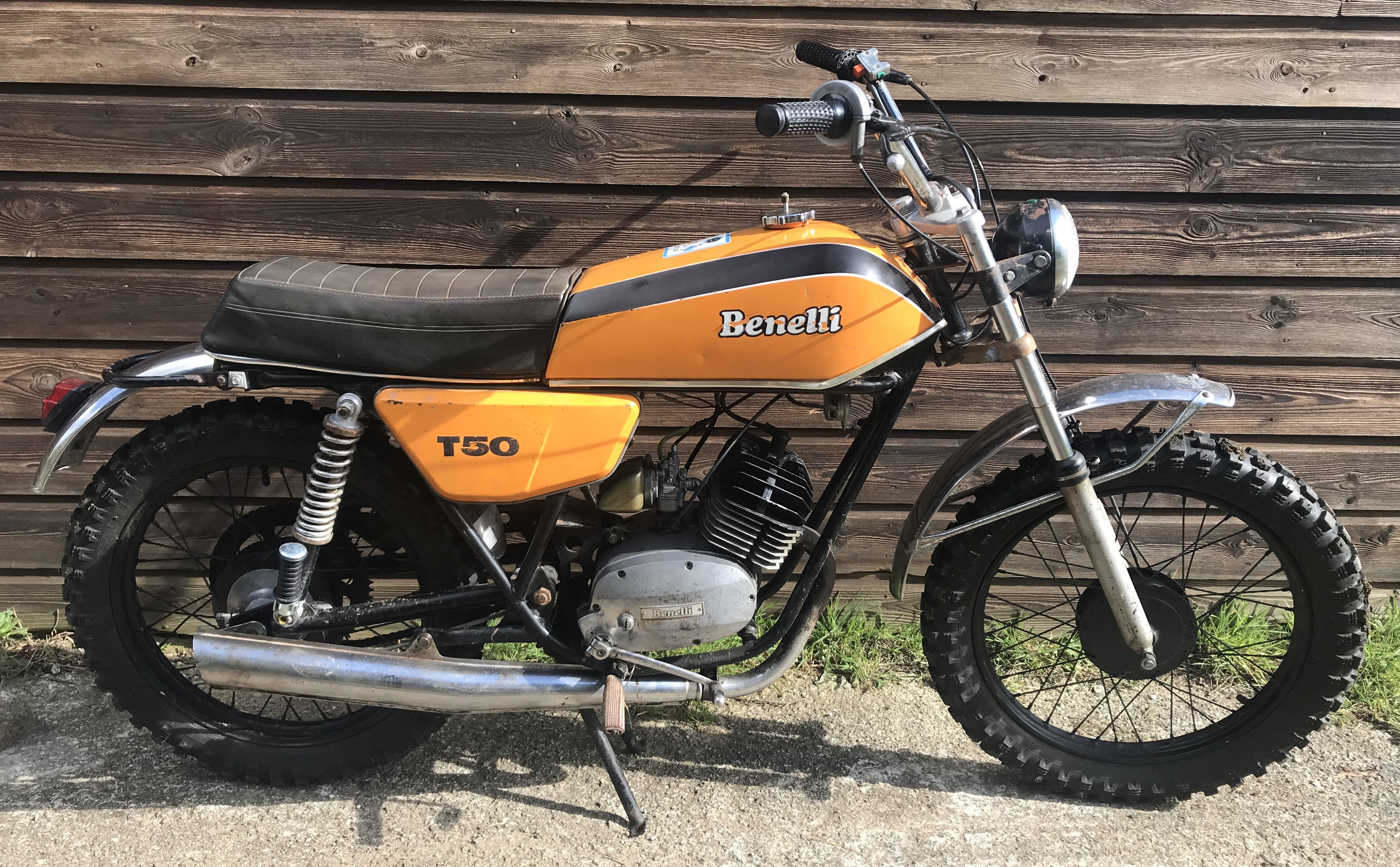
- 1977 Benelli T50
- Manufacturer: Benelli
- Also called: 50 Turismo
- Production: 1973–1979
- Assembly: Pesaro, Italy
- Class: Moped
- Engine: 49 cc (3.0 cu in) two-stroke single
- Bore / stroke: 40 mm × 39 mm (1.6 in × 1.5 in)
- Compression ratio: 8:1
- Power: 1.2 hp (0.89 kW) @ 4,200 rpm (claimed)
- Ignition type: Magneto-flywheel/alternator (6V-18W)
- Transmission: Wet, 5-speed, chain final drive
- Suspension: Front: Telescopic fork Rear: Swinging arm with mechanical dampers
- Brakes: Drum
- Tires: Front: MT76, Rear: MT53
- Wheelbase: 1,220 mm (48 in)
- Dimensions: L: 1,825 mm (71.9 in); W: 750 mm (30 in); H: 990 mm (39 in)
- Weight: 78 kg (172 lb) (claimed) (dry)
- Fuel capacity: 10.5 L (2.3 imp gal; 2.8 US gal)

The Benelli T50, also known as the 50 Turismo, was a 49-cubic-centimetre (3.0 cu in) two-stroke, single-cylinder moped produced by the Italian manufacturer Benelli during the 1970s. The designation "T" stands for Turismo, reflecting its intended use as a road-oriented moped.

The T50 and the Benelli 50 Cross were developed in parallel by Benelli and were both launched at the 1971 Milan Motor Show. The T50 shared much of its mechanical design with the Cross, a motocross-oriented variant.

The T50 was designed by Italian industrial designer Paolo Martin.

Two importer-modified variants of the T50 were sold exclusively in the Netherlands. The GTV 50 and BS50 Sport were assembled and sold by TWIN (Tweewieler Import Nederland), the official Benelli importer in the Netherlands. These variants were not produced in the Benelli factory.

The model was introduced during the European “sports moped” boom of the 1970s, a period in which many manufacturers offered small-displacement mopeds with contemporary styling and road-focused performance. Comparable models were produced by other Italian manufacturers, including Italjet and Gilera.

== See also ==
- List of Benelli motorcycles
- Benelli
