= Benelli TRK =

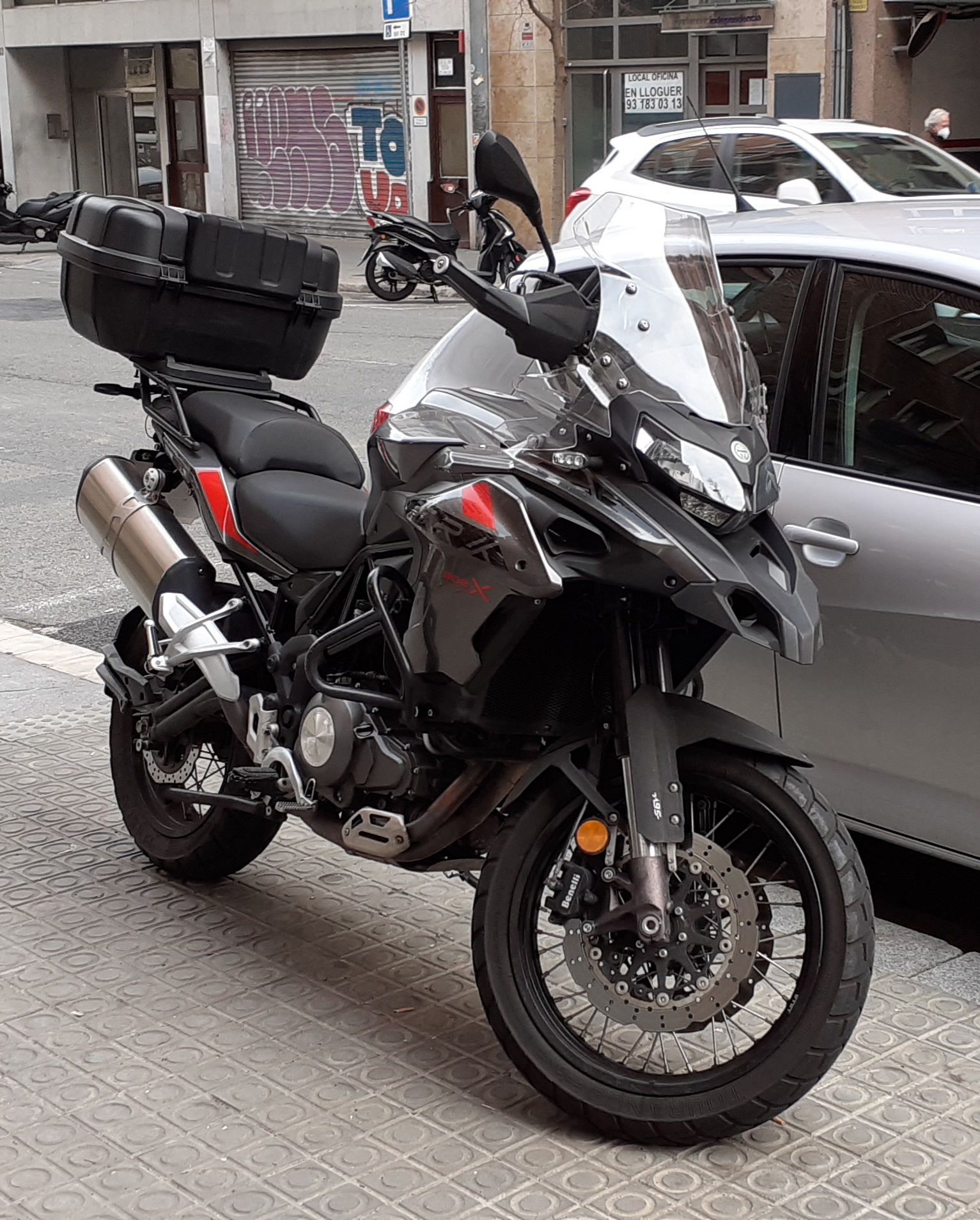
- Manufacturer: Benelli
- Production: 2017-present
- Assembly: China: Wenling
- Class: Dual-sport
- Related: QJmotor SRT

The Benelli TRK is a Benelli dual-sport motorcycle family introduced since 2017.

== History ==
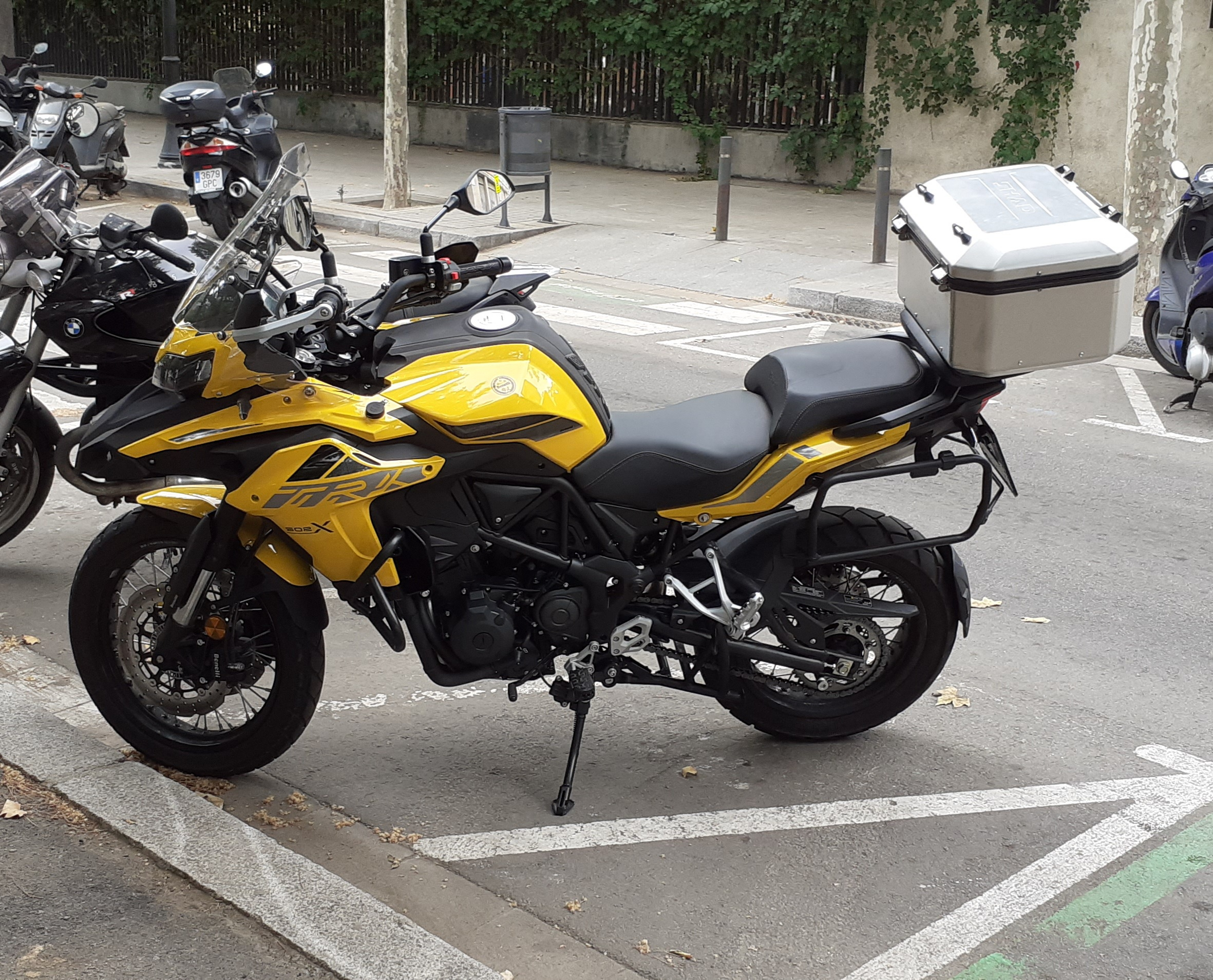
TRK 502X

In November 2015 at the EICMA in Milan, Benelli presented two motorcycles, the Leoncino 500 and the prototype version of the TRK, a medium-displacement road enduro with a 500 cm^{3} engine.

A year later, again at EICMA, the definitive version of the bike made its debut, with the name TRK 502.

The frame is a classic trellis in steel tubes, equipped with a front suspension with 50 mm upside-down forks with a travel of 135 mm, while at the rear there is a classic swingarm anchored to a central shock absorber. The braking system consists of a double semi-floating disc with a diameter of 320 mm with four-piston calipers at the front and a single 260 mm disc equipped with ABS at the rear. The tyres, measuring 120/70 in front and 160/60 in the rear, are mounted on 17-inch cast aluminum wheels.

The engine, placed in a transversal position with a displacement of 499.6 cm^{3}, is a liquid-cooled twin cylinder with 8 valves (4 for each cylinder) fed by an electronic injection system, which delivers a power of 47 horsepower at 8500 rpm and develops a torque of 45 Nm at 5000 rpm, making the bike fall into the A2 novice category. The weight stands at 213 kg. The transmission is entrusted to a six-speed gearbox with chain and the tank has a maximum capacity of 20 litres.

Also at EICMA in 2017, a more off-road version called TRK 502 X made its debut, which was then introduced on the market in mid-2018.

In 2020, 2021 and 2022 it turned out to be the best-selling motorcycle on the Italian market.

In spring 2021 it underwent a restyling with some small changes and updates, both aesthetic and engine.

=== TRK 251 ===
In 2019 a smaller and less powerful version called TRK 251 arrived, equipped with a different engine, a single-cylinder 250 cm^{3} single cam with 4 valves per cylinder and liquid-cooled electronic injection with a power of 24.5 HP delivered at 9500 rpm. which is already being used to equip the Benelli BN 251.

=== TRK 800 ===
The TRK 800 prototype destined for production in 2023 is presented at EICMA 2021. The 800 is powered by the Benelli Leoncino 800 parallel twin cylinder engine of 754 cm^{3}, with double overhead camshaft, four valves per cylinder and liquid cooling. Maximum power is 76 hp and torque is 67 Nm.

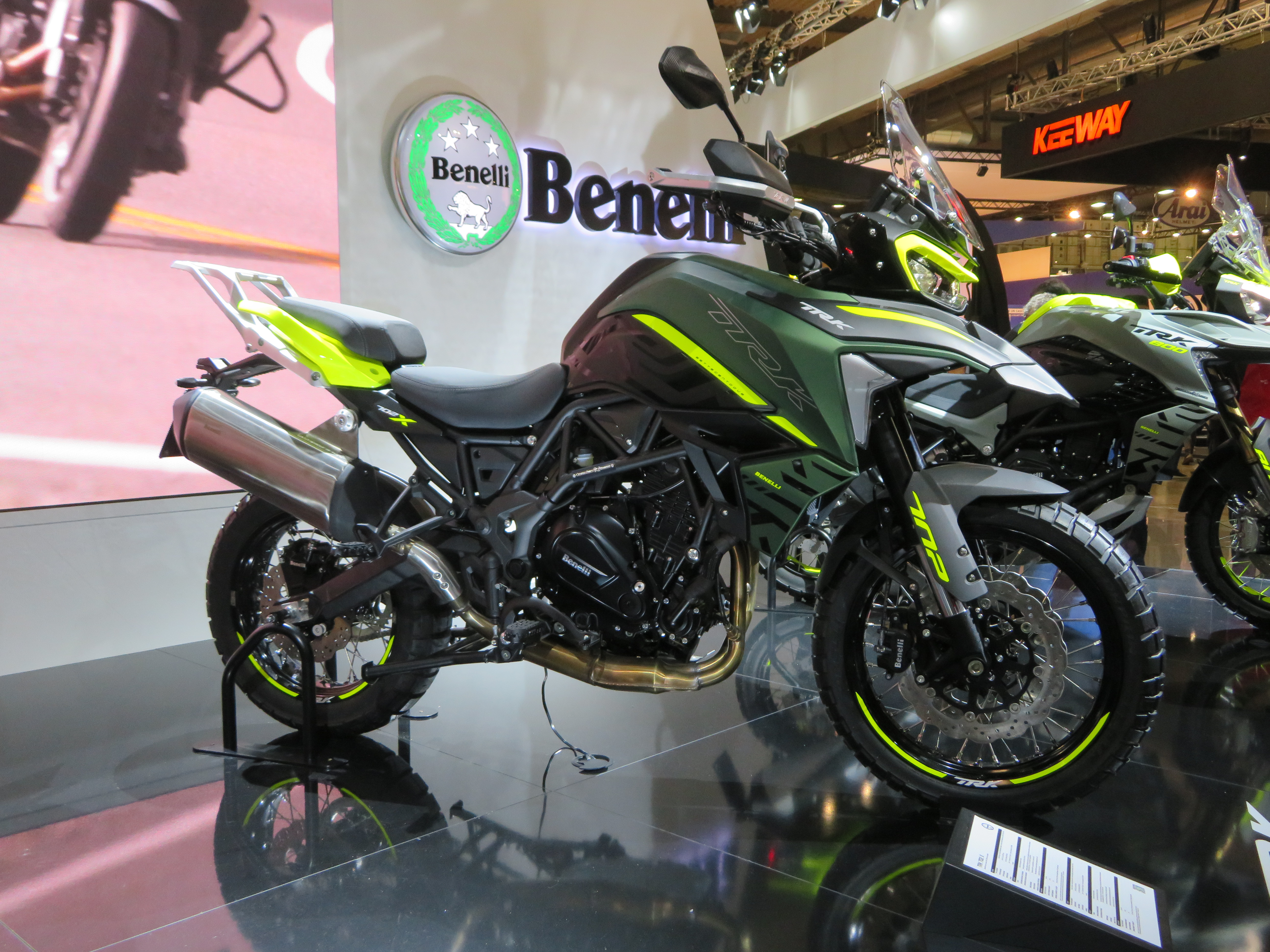
TRK 702X

=== TRK 702 ===
In August 2022, the TRK 702 was presented in China with a new 693 cm^{3} parallel twin-cylinder engine, bore and stroke of 83×64 mm, compression ratio 11.6:1, liquid cooling and four valves per cylinder, combined to the double overhead shaft transmission. The 700 engine can deliver a maximum power of 76.1 HP at 8,500 rpm, and a peak torque of 68.2 Nm at 6,250 rpm, and a detuned 35 kW version is also available for licenses A2. The braking system consists of a double front disc with two-piston floating caliper and a rear disc with single-piston floating caliper. The 702 also has a specific aesthetic, front camera and redesigned saddle. The declared empty weight is equal to 220 kg (238 with full tank), 3 kg less than the TRK 502 model.

The 2025 versions of the TRK 702 and TRK 702X have an engine updated to the Euro 5+ standard, a larger windshield, heated grips, new passenger ergonomics, and a redesigned luggage rack. Rounding out the features is a 5-inch TFT display with Bluetooth and Wi-Fi connectivity, capable of managing notifications and calls and, through a dedicated app, turning into an integrated navigation system. There are also two charging ports, one USB-A and one USB-C, useful for powering devices while riding.

== See also ==
- List of Benelli motorcycles
