= Benelli Adiva =

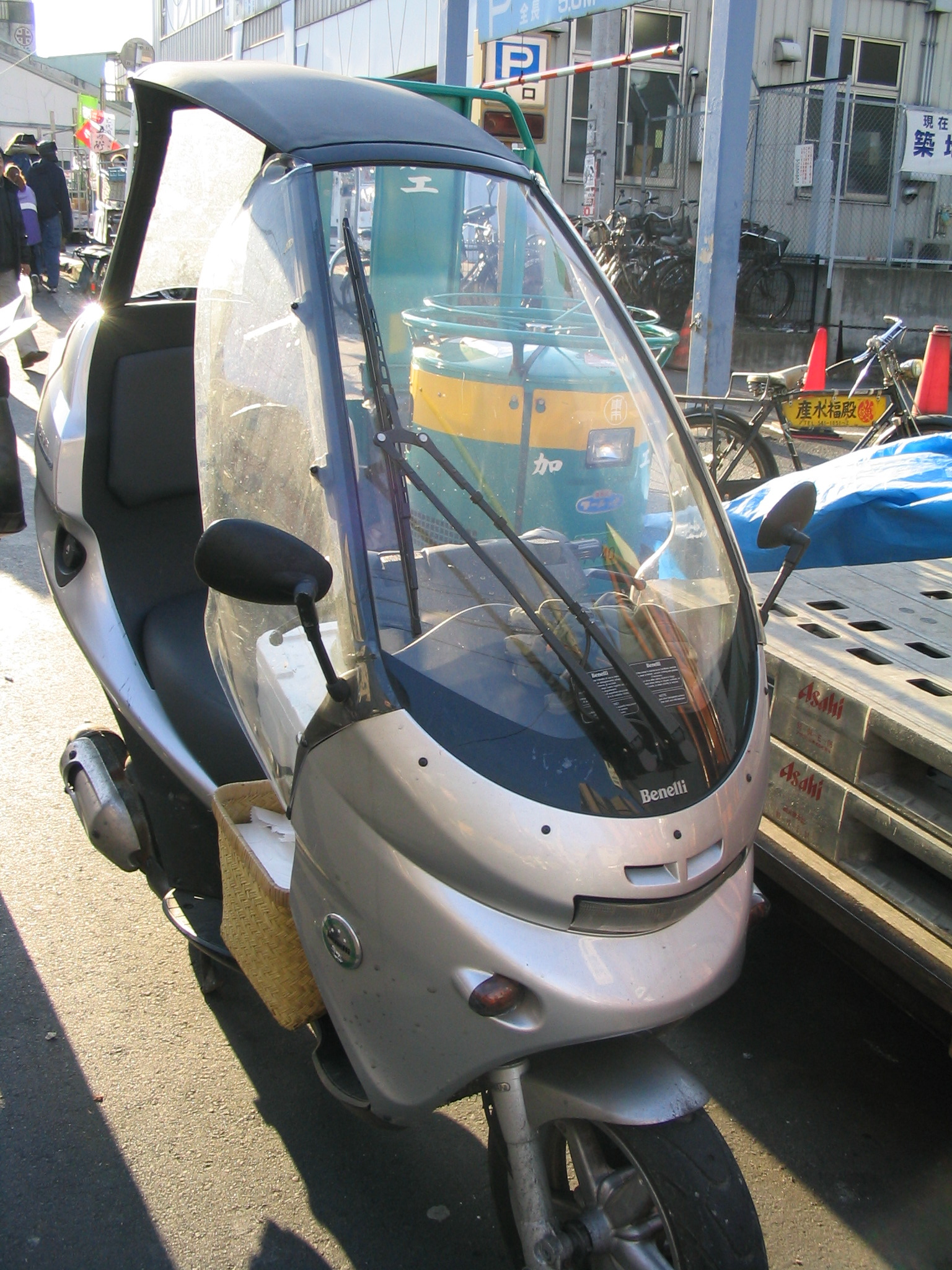
- Manufacturer: Benelli; Adiva
- Also called: Renault Fulltime
- Production: 2000–2006
- Assembly: Pesaro, Italy (Benelli)
- Successor: Adiva AD250
- Class: Scooter
- Engine: Piaggio LEADER 125 - 124 cm^{3} 150 - 151 cm^{3}

The Benelli Adiva is the first scooter manufactured as a joint venture between Benelli and Adiva SRL.

== History ==
The Adiva has an innovative folding metal roof, which, together with the windscreen and side wind deflectors, offers excellent weather protection for rider and pillion passenger.

First displayed in 1999 it was sold to the public between 2001 and 2006.

Although similar in looks to the BMW C1, the Adiva's roof is only for weather protection. When not required, the roof can be folded up and stored in a rear storage box (80 liters).

The Adiva is regarded as having better handling than the C1.

The Adiva was offered in 125 and 150 cc versions, which share identical bodywork. The Adiva uses a Piaggio Leader ET4 engine, which is also used in the Piaggio Vespa. Top speed is approximately 60 mph.

The Adiva was also sold by car manufacturer Renault under the name Full Time.

Adiva corporation started on July 31, 1996, with a goal of developing a new generation of vehicles better suited for the city mobility, based on the concepts and innovations of entrepreneur Nicola Pozio. The first Adiva concept scooter was shown to the Italian public in 1994, and the international patent on the Adiva foldable roof was granted in 2004. The first Adiva product to enter into production was launched at the Milan motorcycle show in 2000, under an OEM agreement with Benelli. In 2002 ADIVA started a new project to develop a second generation of scooters, which were introduced in 2007 under their own brand name, now with a 250 or 200cc engine.

== See also ==
- List of Benelli motorcycles
