= Benelli Tornado Tre 900 =

Benelli Tornado Tre
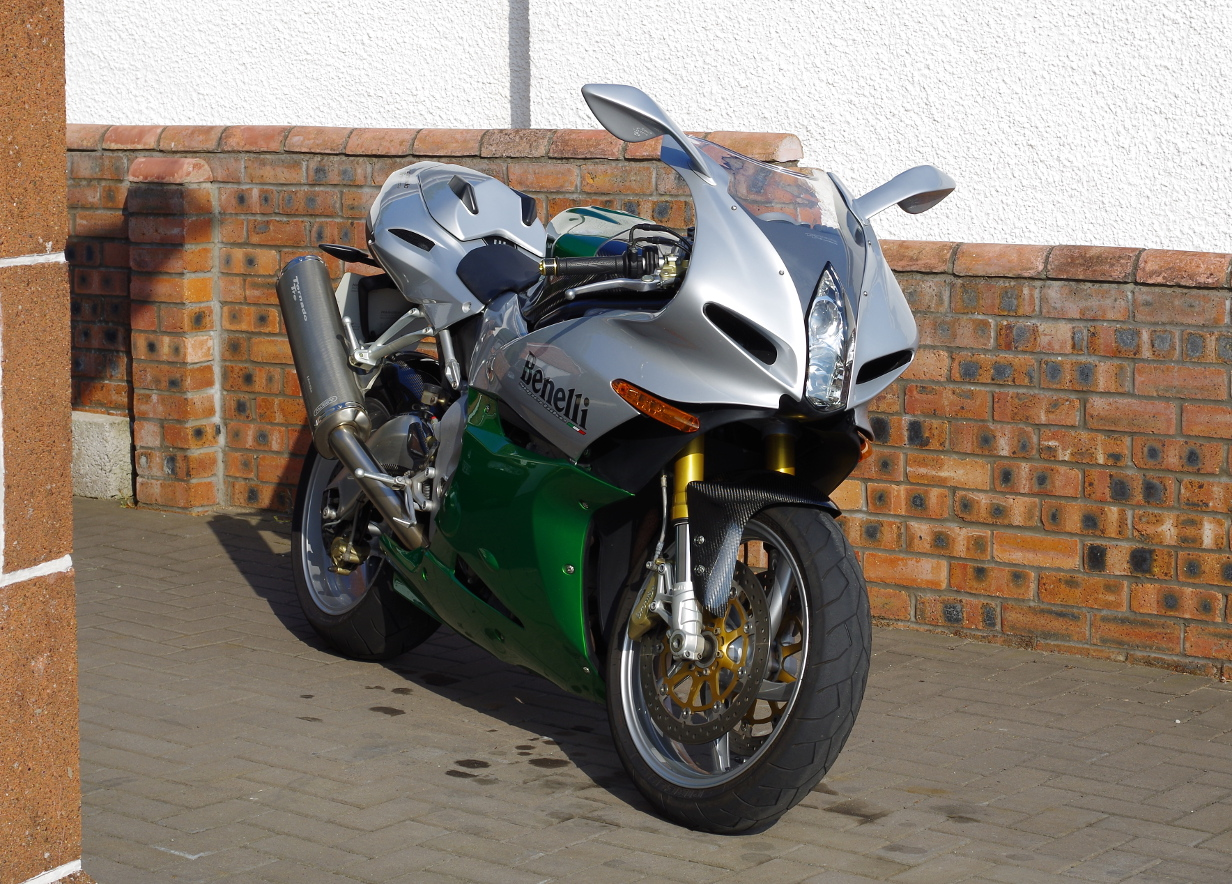
- 2013 Tornado Tre 900
- Manufacturer: Benelli
- Production: 2002–2014
- Assembly: Italy: Pesaro
- Class: Sport bike
- Engine: Four-stroke 898cc Inline-triple DOHC 12 valve
- Bore / stroke: 88 mm × 49.2 mm (3.46 in × 1.94 in)
- Compression ratio: 11.0:1
- Ignition type: Electronic, SAGEM
- Transmission: 6-speed
- Frame type: Steel and aluminium alloy twin-spar, with engine as stressed member
- Suspension: Front: twin-50mm Marzocchi upside-down forks Rear: cast aluminium asymmetric swingarm, single Extreme Tech
- Brakes: Front: Double 320 millimetres (13 in) disc brake, with Brembo 4-piston caliper Rear: Single 240 millimetres (9.4 in) disc brake, with Brembo 4-piston caliper
- Tires: Front: 120/70-17; Rear: 180/55-17
- Rake, trail: 23.5°
- Wheelbase: 1,419 millimetres (55.9 in)
- Dimensions: L: 2,039 millimetres (80.3 in); W: 717 millimetres (28.2 in); H: 1,153 millimetres (45.4 in)
- Seat height: 810 millimetres (32 in)
- Weight: 198 kilograms (437 lb) (dry)
- Fuel capacity: 18 litres (4.0 imp gal; 4.8 US gal)
- Fuel consumption: 41 miles per imperial gallon (6.9 L/100 km; 34 mpg_{‑US})

The Benelli Tornado Tre 900 is a motorcycle made from 2002 to 2014 by Benelli of Pesaro, Italy. The last model was designated as the Tornado Tre 903.

== Background ==
In 1973 Benelli and competitor Moto Guzzi were acquired by Argentinian industrialist Alejandro de Tomaso. Although technically advanced, Benelli motorcycles of the 1980s were plagued by problems, and so in 1988 the companies were merged to create "Guzzi Benelli Moto S.p.A.", with Benelli production stopped and the production plants in Pesaro sold.

After a failed attempt to revive the brand under Giancarlo Selci in 1989, in 1995 Andrea Merloni bought the rights to the Benelli brand from de Tomaso. Needing a relaunch model, he noted the success of John Bloor in reviving Triumph Motorcycles Ltd, and so briefed a design team to build a stylish and exclusive motorcycle around a distinctive triple-cylinder 1,000 cc capacity engine.

== Production ==
The new Benelli company showed a stunning design model at the Milan motorcycle show in 1999, which combined both angular and curved elements. Housing a three cylinders 900 cc engine, the engine was also part of the bike's stressed frame. The engine was purposefully placed quite well forward to keep the front wheel down under acceleration, but as this left little space for the radiator it was placed under the rear seat pan, resulting in a high riding position. It also meant that airflow was restricted around the radiator, resulting in the need to place twin yellow-coloured electric fans under the rear seat, which became a distinct rearward view of the bike. The resultant hands down/bum-up riding position, although colloquially Italian, made earlier testers question the duration of any long-distance riding, placing a lot of weight on the rider's wrists and stress on the extended back.

In 2001 former Australian Superbike champion Peter Goddard signed-on to accelerate the development phase, with the first production models to come off of the new Pesaro -based production lines in 2002.

While the motorcycle sourced a number of components from various historic Italian manufacturers (Brembo, Marzocchi, etc.), the electronics were co-sourced from the same manufacturer as that for the 1,000cc triple Triumph Daytona 955i, French company SAGEM. Due to European Union emissions regulations, which are undertaken with a test of the engine revving at 3,500 rpm, like many motorcycles of the time both models suffered a distinct "dip" in power at this point to enable them to clearly pass the test. Combined with a fierce fuel injection management mapping system, the bike tended to have a peaky response. Later and continuing in-house development cured much of this quickly, as well as new injectors from the 2004 models onwards.

== Issues ==
The early models suffered from both high prices, poor fuel injection mapping and poor reliability. Sold as a premium model, dealers were few and factory support not ideal in the early production time, meaning that customers were asked to pay a number of recurring visits to the garage. As a result, sales were slow, and second hand prices fell quickly due to owners' reliability concerns.

One of the common early problems was with the clutch basket which was eventually replaced under warranty. The intermediate gear was strengthened and concentricity improved. However, the problem then moved to the next weakest part, the alternator drive shaft/Z25 gear, which, in extreme cases could break at a lubrication hole. It commonly manifested itself in the 1130 variant of the engine, as a difficulty to crank the engine when hot. The root cause of the clutch / alternator drive problem was thermal expansion, which reduced the Z25 / intermediate gear clearances to negative. The solution was to improve the concentricity of both the clutch intermediate and alternator drive shaft gears, and increase their clearance. At the same time, the alternator drive hub fastening method was changed from a lock washer to a belleville washer to stop the bolt from working loose due to heat cycling.

With these changes, the engine reliability improved to meet or exceed its peers.

Continual development of the fuel injection mapping also improved the rideability.

== Models ==
The launch Tornado Tre base model, also called the "biposto", was quickly followed by 150 units of the Tornado Novecento LE, to homologate a suitable base model for the Superbike World Championship. Similar to the base biposto, it additionally featured carbon fibre bodywork and tank, light weight magnesium wheels and Ohlins suspension.

In 2004, Benelli stroked the engine to create the new Benelli Tornado Tre 1130, which now developing 161 brake horsepower (120 kW) challenged the established Italian superbike hierarchy of Ducati.

== Tornado Tre Production Numbers ==
RS red: 363
RS yellow orion (Lamborghini): 15
Tre 900 red: 409
Tre 900 green/silver: 925
Tre 900 black/silver: 205
Tre 900 nera: 1
Tre 900 LE: 150

== Gallery ==
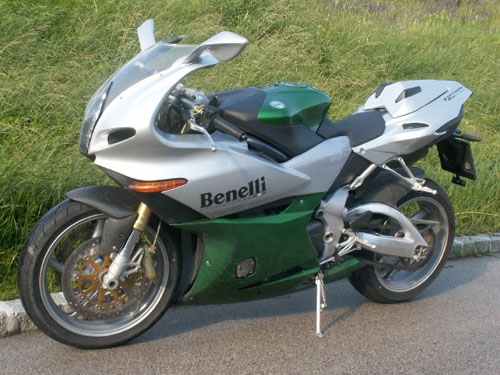
2003 Tornado Tre 900

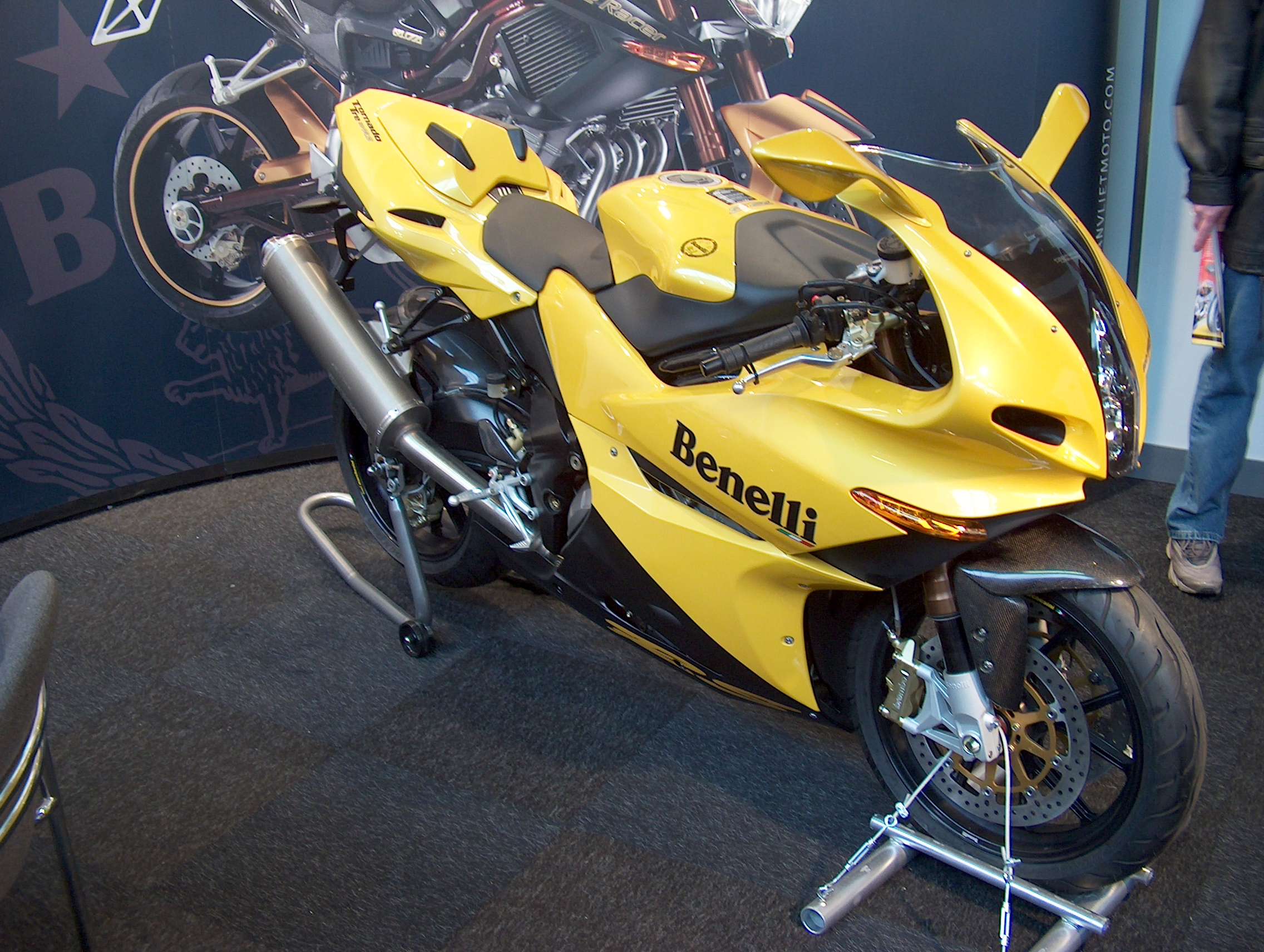
2005 Tornado Tre 900 RS

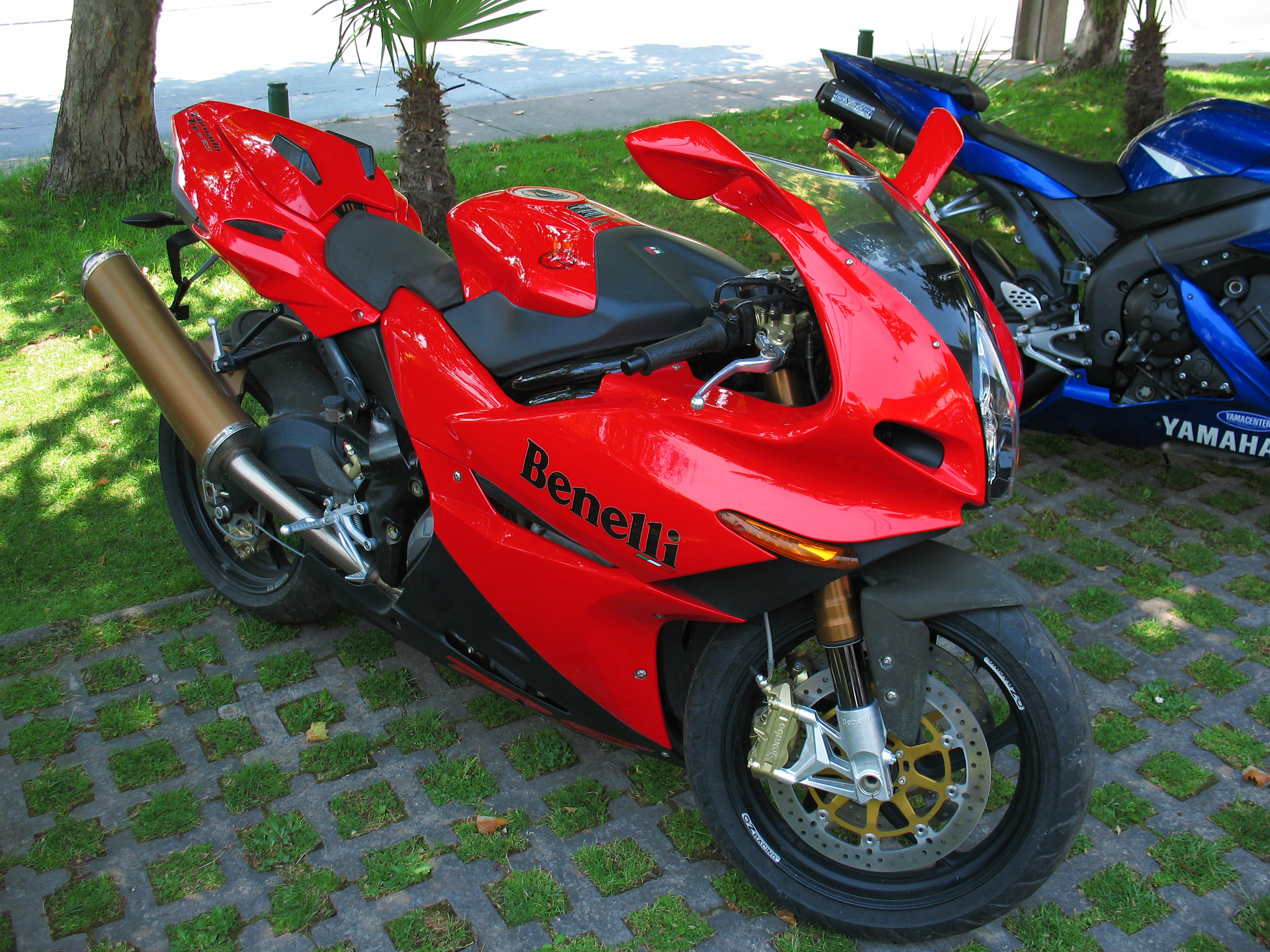
2010 Tornado Tre 900 RS

== See also ==
- List of Benelli motorcycles
