= Benelli 650 Tornado =

Vertical twin Italian motorcycle

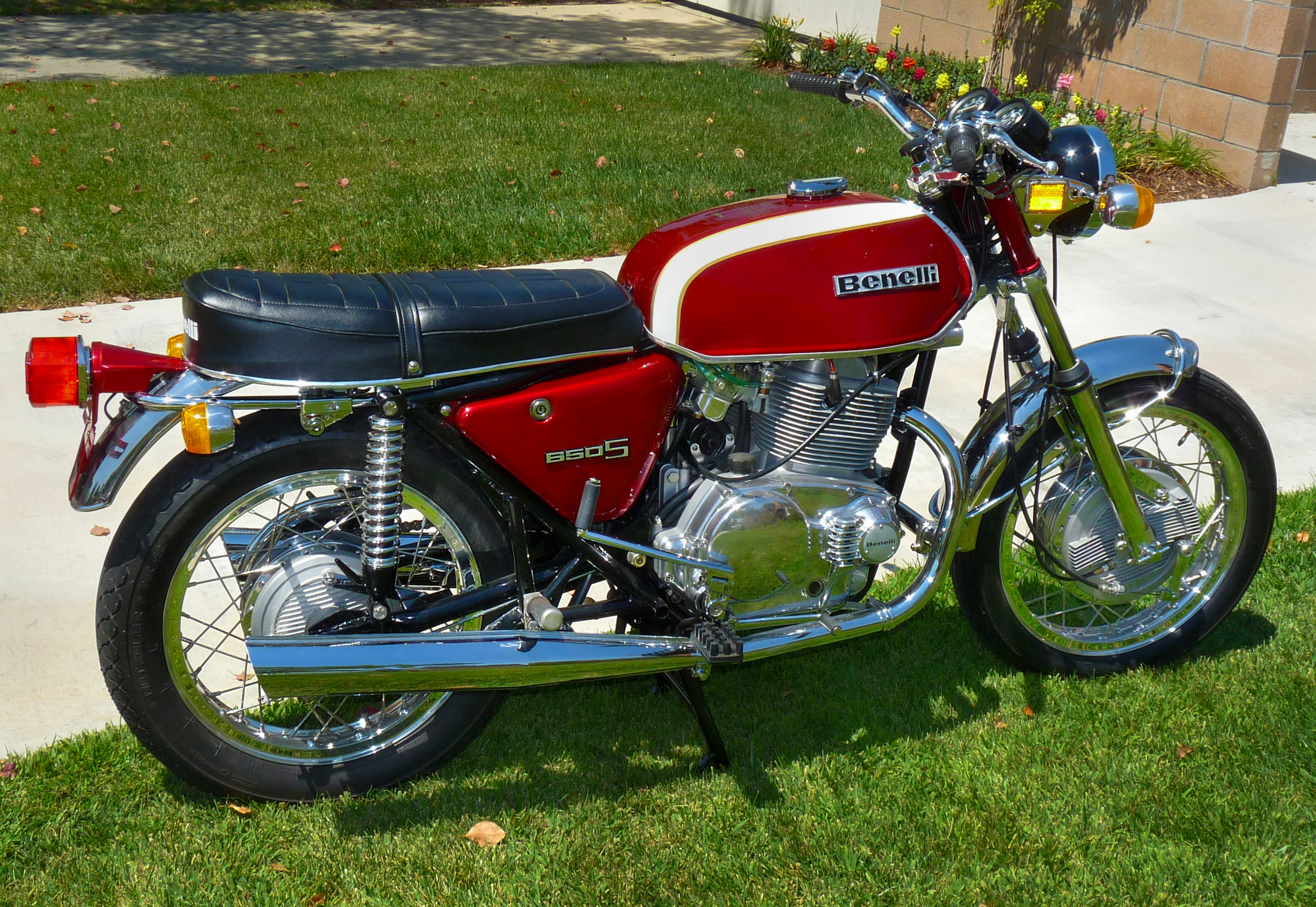
- 1972 Benelli Tornado 650S
- Production: 1970–1975
- Assembly: Italy: Pesaro
- Engine: 643 cc (39.2 cu in) air cooled ohv parallel twin
- Bore / stroke: 84 mm × 58 mm (3.3 in × 2.3 in)
- Compression ratio: 9:1/9.6:1
- Top speed: 111 mph (179 km/h)
- Power: 52–58 bhp (39–43 kW) @ 7,400 rpm
- Transmission: Wet clutch, 5 speed, chain drive
- Frame type: Duplex cradle
- Suspension: Front: telescopic forks Rear swinging arm
- Brakes: Drum 230 mm (9.1 in) twin sided front, 200 mm (7.9 in) rear
- Tyres: 350x18 front, 400x18 rear
- Wheelbase: 1,380 mm (54 in)
- Seat height: 810 mm (32 in)
- Weight: 460 lb (210 kg) (dry)
- Fuel capacity: 12.5 L (2.7 imp gal; 3.3 US gal)

The Benelli 650 Tornado is a 650 cc (40 cu in) parallel twin motorcycle produced by the Italian manufacturer Benelli from 1970 to 1975. The model was intended to compete with the British big twins in the lucrative American Market but by the time the model was introduced the market had changed following the launch of multi-cylinder bikes by the Japanese manufacturers, most notably the Honda CB750. The Tornado was also badge engineered as a Motobi, Benelli's sister company. Around 3,000 Tornados were produced with half being sold in Italy.

== Model History ==
Benelli had only made 250 cc and smaller machines since WW2 and wished to expand their range, particularly into the lucrative North American Market which was dominated by British twins. Piero Prampolini, who had designed the Benelli 4 cylinder racers, designed the undersquare engine. A prototype was shown at the 1967 Milan Motorcycle Show.

The bike was more complex than previous designs and required the factory to purchase new machinery for production. Financial restrictions and disagreements between the Benelli brothers delayed setting up of the production line. Development of the machine continued during this time, including by Renzo Pasolini and actor Steve McQueen, who was the US ambassador for Benelli. McQueen suggested a Metisse-type chassis would improve handling. Luigi Benelli, who had never designed a frame for a motorcycle this heavy or powerful before, designed such a frame. A second prototype was shown at the 1969 Lombard Fair and production started in 1970.

=== Tornado ===
The first production bikes were delivered to the US in 1970 and in early 1971 it was introduced in Europe. It was now known as the Tornado and had a less restrictive exhaust system and larger 29 mm (1.1 in) Dell'Orto carburettors. Low speed handling was criticised which was attributed to the engine sitting too high in the frame.

=== 650S ===
Following Alejandro de Tomaso's acquisition of Benelli in 1972, a revised version, the 650S, was introduced that had an electric starter fitted. It also had a rebalanced crankshaft, increased compression, revised gear ratios and instruments by Veglia. To counter the effects of vibration, many components were rubber-mounted (silentbloc) and weights added to the handlebar ends.

Tornados for the American market differed from those for the European market in small details such as handlebars and seat.

==== 650 S2 ====
The final version, the 650S2, was introduced in 1973. It had a higher compression ratio giving more low-end torque, further rubber-mounting of components, a humped seat and clear handlebar fairing.

=== Tour of Italy ===
Organised by Milan dealer Lombromotori to demonstrate reliability, a S2 was run continuously around Italy for 25 hours by a team of 18 celebrity riders. These included Bruno Francisci, Tarquinio Provini, Gigi Villoresi and Walter Villa. In total 2,612 km (1,623 mi) were covered.

== Technical details ==
Prampolini's racing background prompted him to design an engine that was as oil-tight as possible. The engine used horizontally split crankcases; o-rings on mating surfaces and external oil-lined were kept to a minimum. Also carried over from racing was the over-square bore and stroke of 84 mm × 58 mm (3.3 in × 2.3 in), which allowed relatively large valves of 38 mm (1.5 in) inlet and 35 mm (1.4 in) exhaust. The short stroke allowed the conrods to be short and reduced the engine's overall height. To reduce piston slap, the cylinders were offset 2.5 mm (0.098 in) rearwards from the crankshaft. A wide squish band was employed between pistons and head to improve combustion at low revs.

The crankshaft was supported on four large main bearings, the outer ones being double row ball and the inners roller bearings. A large flywheel was place between the centre bearings. Needle bearings were used on the big and small ends. Piston to cylinder friction is normally greatest at the rear of the cylinder. Prampolini reversed the rotation of the engine so this source of heat was brought to the front of the engine where is would be better cooled by the airflow around the engine.

Originally fitted with a single 30 mm (1.2 in) Dell’Orto VHB carb, twin 29 mm (1.1 in) VHB square slide carburettors were fitted on the production models. Lubrication employed a wet sump system with a 3 L (0.66 imp gal; 0.79 US gal) sump.

A Bosch dynamo was mounted being the cylinders, driven by a belt. This was replaced by an electric starter on the S models, driven by a chain, and an alternator fitted on the end of the crankshaft.

Primary drive was by helical gear to the multiplate wet clutch. The same helical gear drove the camshaft which was located at the front of the engine. A 5 speed gearbox was fitted and chain drive took power to the rear wheel.

Front suspension was by 38mm Marzocchi forks and rear suspension was by swinging arm with twin Ceriani shock absorbers. Brakes were drums from Grimeca, the front being a twin-sided 230 mm (9.1 in) unit and the rear 200 mm (7.9 in) diameter.
