= Benelli Tre 1130 K =

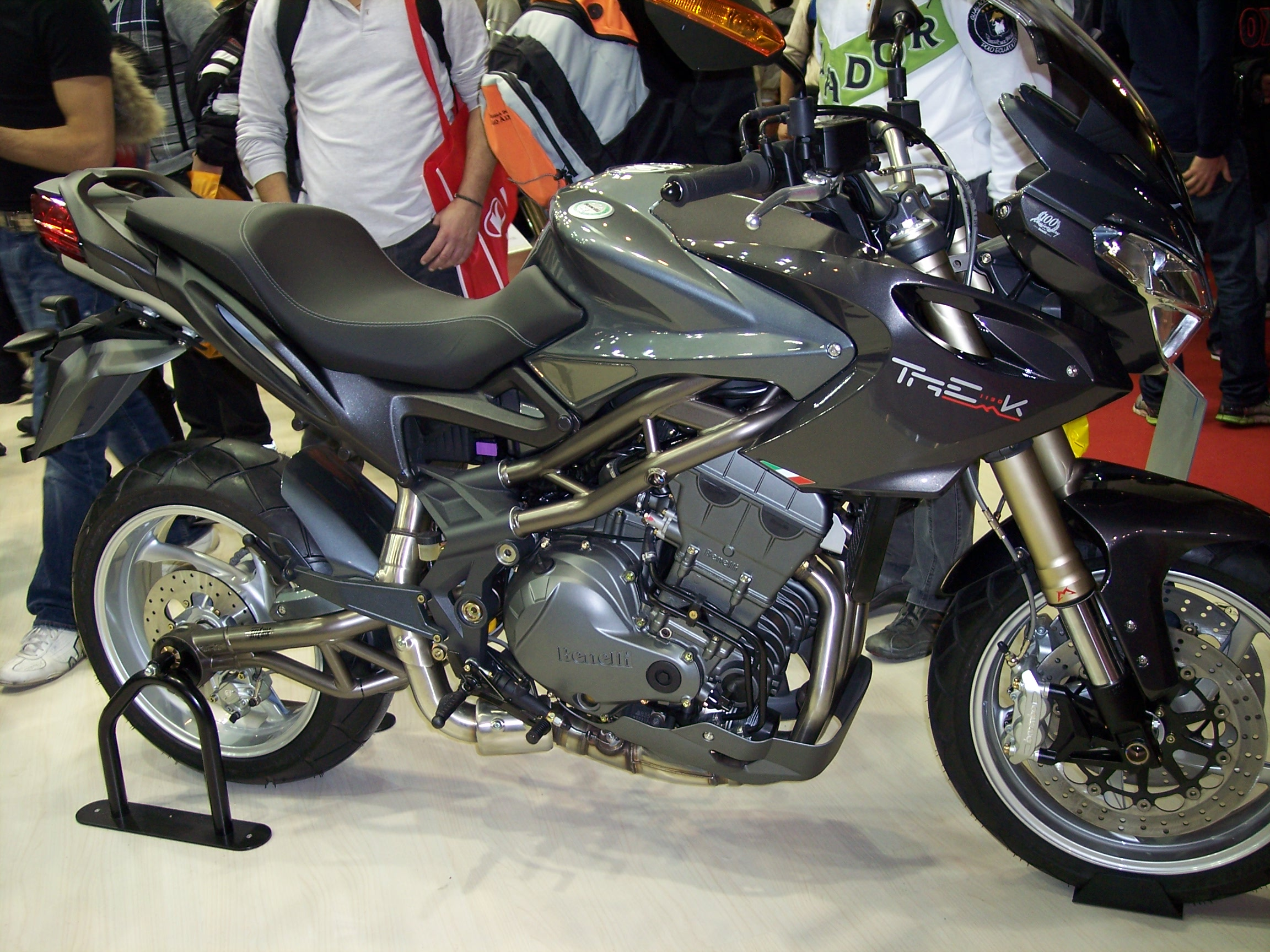
- Manufacturer: Benelli
- Production: 2006–2017
- Assembly: Pesaro, Italy
- Class: Sport bike
- Engine: 1,130 cc (69 cu in) liquid-cooled four-stroke DOHC straight-three
- Bore / stroke: 88 mm × 62 mm (3.5 in × 2.4 in)
- Compression ratio: 11.9:1
- Transmission: 6-speed
- Brakes: Brembo 320 mm (13 in) dual discs with 4-piston calipers (front), single 240 mm (9.4 in) disc with 2-piston calipers (rear)
- Tires: Dunlop D270 120/70-17 (front), 180/55-17 (rear)
- Rake, trail: 25°, 109 mm (4.3 in)
- Wheelbase: 1,514 mm (59.6 in)
- Dimensions: L: 2,183 mm (85.9 in); W: 850 mm (33 in); H: 1,320 mm (52 in)
- Seat height: 810 mm (32 in)
- Fuel capacity: 22 L (4.8 imp gal; 5.8 US gal) + 4 L (0.88 imp gal; 1.1 US gal) reserve

The Benelli Tre 1130 K is a Benelli 1100 class sport bike. It has a liquid-cooled four-stroke three-cylinder DOHC 1,130 cc (69 cu in) engine based on the design used in the Tornado Naked Tre 1130, or TnT. Like the TnT, it also has a tubular frame.

== See also ==
- List of Benelli motorcycles
