= Benelli Volcano =

- Manufacturer: Benelli
- Production: Early 1970s
- Assembly: Italy
- Class: Minibike
- Engine: 180 cc (11 cu in) two-stroke
- Top speed: 56 mph (90 km/h)
- Transmission: 4-speed

The Benelli Volcano is a four-speed, two-stroke 180-cubic-centimetre (11 cu in) minibike produced in Italy during the early 1970s. Only 200 units were imported to the United States, exclusively by Cosmopolitan Motors, though examples can also be found in Italy. The Volcano was the most powerful minibike manufactured by Benelli, achieving a top speed of 56 mph (90 km/h).

== See also ==
- List of Benelli motorcycles
