= Benelli 254 =

Inline four Italian motorcycle

Benelli 254 Moto Guzzi 254
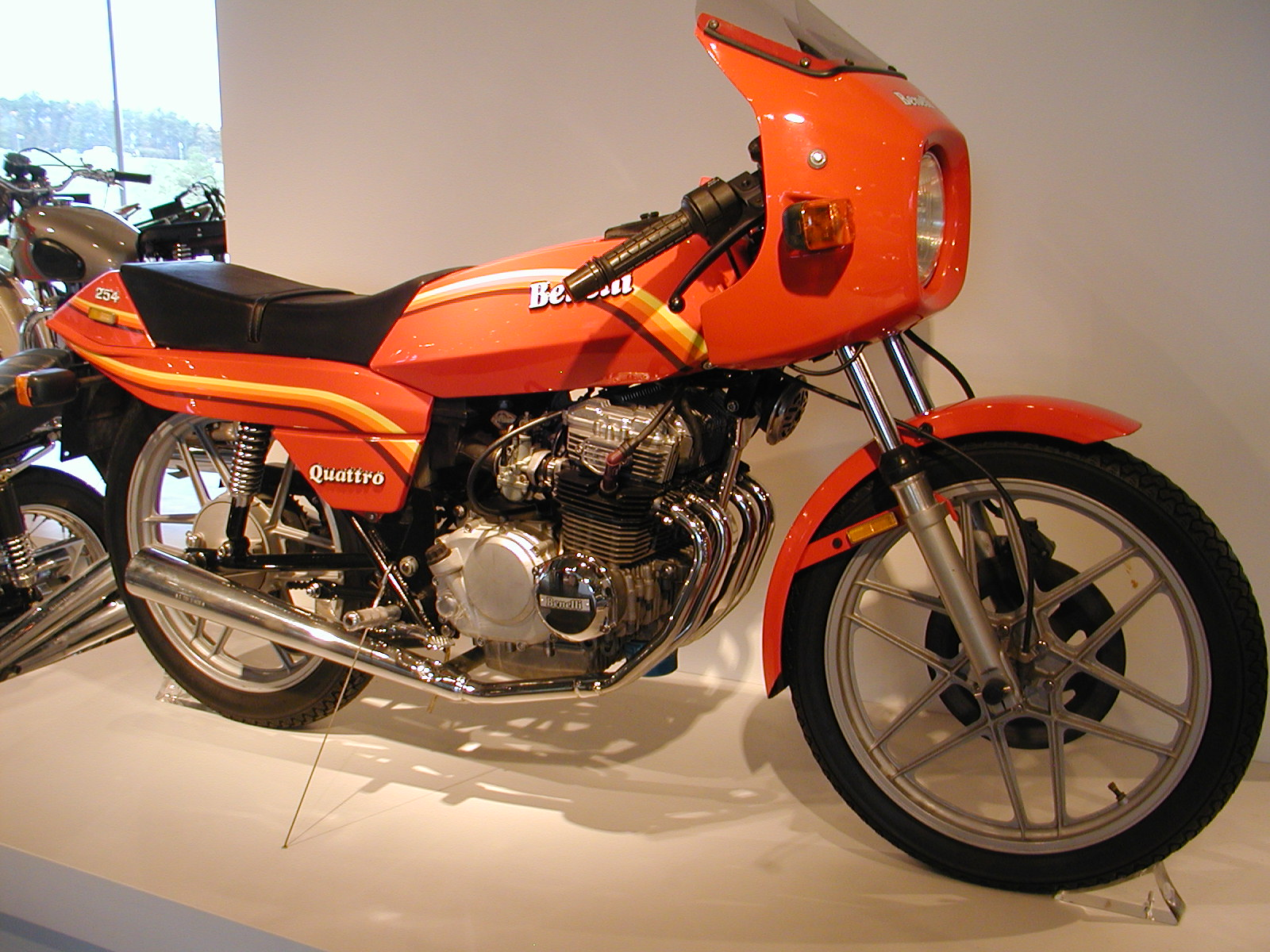
- 1981 Benelli 254
- Also called: Benelli 250 Quatro
- Production: 1977–1984
- Assembly: Italy: Pesaro
- Class: Standard
- Engine: 231 cc (14.1 cu in) air cooled SOHC inline four
- Bore / stroke: 44 mm × 38 mm (1.7 in × 1.5 in)
- Top speed: 93 mph (150 km/h)
- Power: 27.8 bhp (20.7 kW) @ 10,500 rpm
- Transmission: 5 speed chain drive
- Frame type: Single cradle
- Suspension: Front: telescopic forks Rear swinging arm
- Brakes: Front: disc Rear drum
- Wheelbase: 1,270 mm (50 in)
- Weight: 117 kg (258 lb) (dry)
- Fuel capacity: 8.5 L (1.9 imp gal; 2.2 US gal)
- Fuel consumption: 35 mpg_{‑imp} (8.1 L/100 km; 29 mpg_{‑US})

The Benelli 254, originally known as the Benelli 250 Quatro, is a 250 cc (15 cu in) inline four motorcycle produced by the Italian manufacturer Benelli from 1977 to 1984. It was at the time the smallest production four. The model was also badge engineered as the Moto Guzzi 254.

== Model history ==
With the backing of the Italian Government agency Gepi, Italian-Argentine industrialist Alejandro de Tomaso purchased Benelli and Moto Guzzi in 1972. He set about introducing a range of new models, including one to take advantage of the tax concessions on machines under 250 cc in Italy and other markets.

The bike was designed by engineer Lino Tonti and although a four, was a different design the larger 500/4. Styling was by Paolo Martin. The 250 Quatro was First shown at the 1975 Milan Motorcycle Show, and production started in 1977.

Plastic and aluminium were used extensively to keep the weight down to 117 kg (258 lb). Martin's sleek styling included uncluttered handlebars, with the clocks and brake master cylinder mounted in the tank. This reduced the tank capacity to 8.5 L (1.9 imp gal; 2.2 US gal), and gave the bike a range of only 75 to 85 miles (121 to 137 km). The British Moto Guzzi importers declined to import the model because of the range.

The Benelli version was aimed a more sports market whereas the Moto Guzzi was intended to be more touring oriented. The two brands used different tanks and seat humps. On the Benelli 3 spoke cast wheels were fitted and 6 spoke on the Guzzi. The machine was expensive compared to its rivals and sales were slow. The Guzzi version stopped production in 1981, although was still available in showrooms for a few years. Less than 1,000 of the Guzzi version were produced. The Benelli variant stopped production in 1984.

=== Benelli 304 ===
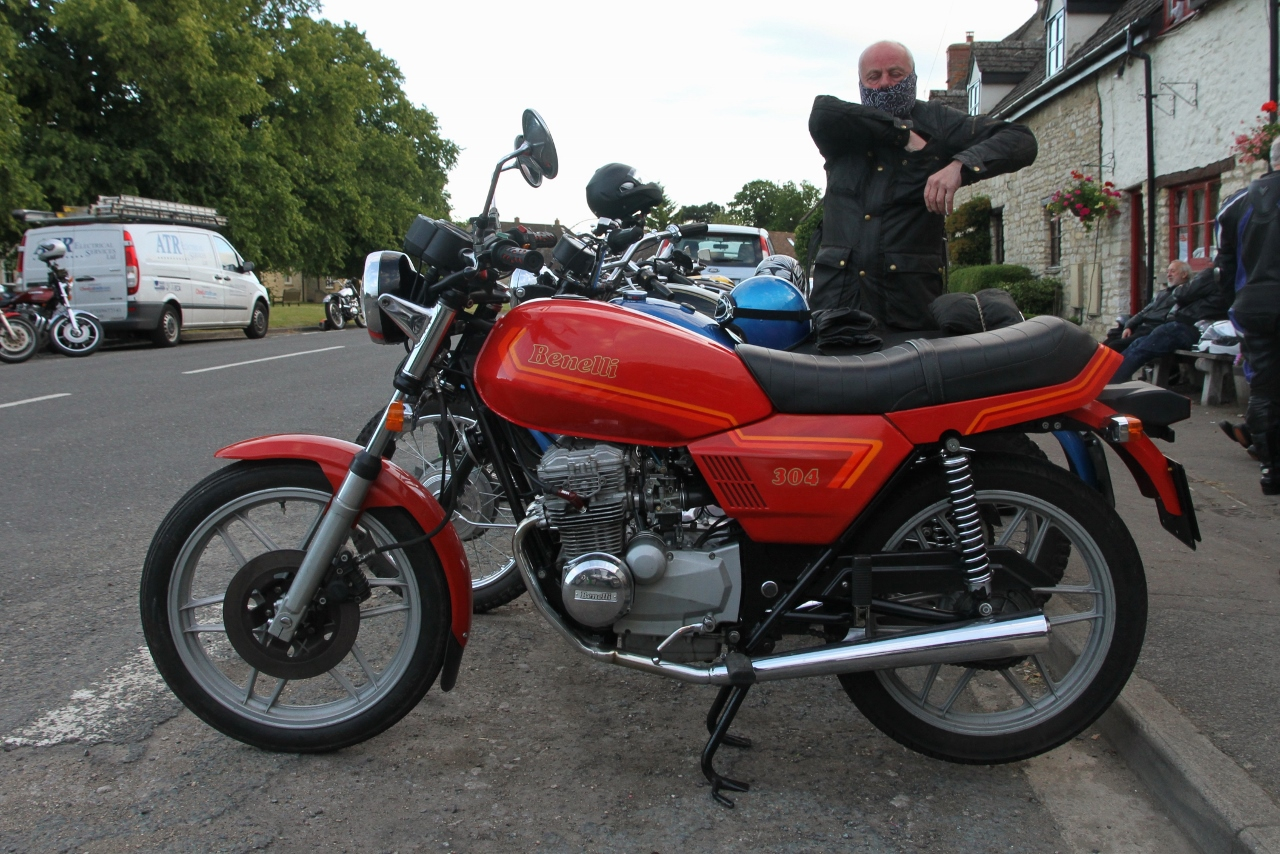
1990 Benelli 304

A re-styled version, the Benelli 304, was introduced in 1983. It was fitted with a twin downtube frame and power output raised to 29 bhp (22 kW). Production ended in 1986, but stocks of the machines were being sold until the early '90s.

== Technical details ==
The transverse four engine was compact and light, weighing only 78 lb (35 kg) not including its four 18 mm (0.71 in) Dell'Orto carburettors. A chain was used to drive the SOHC. Oversquare with a bore and stroke of 44 mm × 38 mm (1.7 in × 1.5 in), the engine revved freely to its limit of 11,800 rpm.

A 5 speed gearbox was fitted and drive to the rear wheel was by chain.

The model had a single downtube frame, suspension was by telescopic forks and swinging arm. A Grimeca front disc was fitted and the rear brake was a drum.
