= Benelli Sei =

Benelli 750 Sei
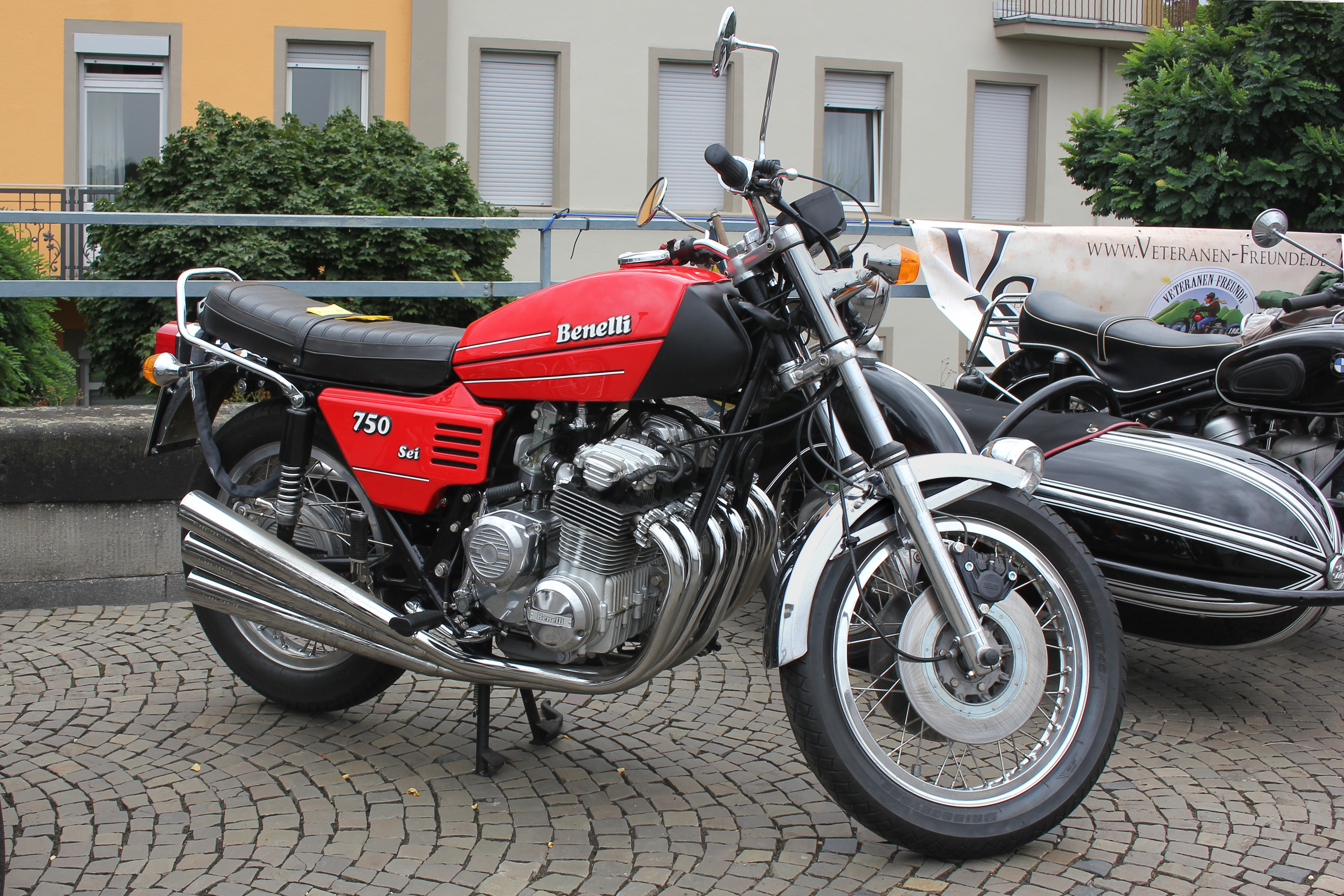
- Manufacturer: Benelli
- Production: 1973–1978
- Assembly: Italy: Pesaro
- Engine: 747 cc air-cooled inline-6
- Bore / stroke: 56 mm × 50.6 mm (2.20 in × 1.99 in)
- Compression ratio: 9.8:1
- Top speed: 200 km/h (120 mph)
- Power: 76 hp (57 kW) @ 9000 rpm
- Transmission: 5-speed, wet clutch
- Suspension: Front: 38 mm Marzocchi telescopic forks Rear: Twin shock
- Brakes: Front: Twin disc Rear: Drum
- Tires: Front: 3.50 H 18; Rear: 4.25 H 18
- Weight: 235 kg (518 lb) (dry); 255 kg (562 lb) (wet)
- Fuel capacity: 23 L (5.1 imp gal; 6.1 US gal)

The Benelli Sei is a series of motorcycles that were produced by Italian manufacturer Benelli, and masterminded by automotive designer Alejandro de Tomaso, from 1973 to 1989. Two models were made, with 750 and 900 cc displacement. The 750 was the first production motorcycle with a six-cylinder engine.

== Benelli 750 Sei ==
The Benelli 750 Sei was the first production motorcycle with a 6-cylinder engine and had two model releases. De Tomaso intended it to become Italy's premier sporting motorcycle and wanted it badged as a Moto Guzzi. On its launch, it received tremendous publicity overshadowing all other Italian bikes of that year. It started the trend of angular designed motorcycles moving away from traditional round forms.

The engine was based on the four-cylinder Honda CB500, but with two extra cylinders. The cylinder head fins of the Sei were squared off to provide a cosmetic individuality, but otherwise the engine is in most respects obviously derived from the Honda. The "angular, bold design" was by Carrozzeria Ghia. It produced 76 bhp (57 kW) at 9,000 rpm, had a top speed of around 127 mph (204 km/h) and was one of the smoothest European tourers.

Despite the extra cylinders, the Sei's width was kept to a minimum by siting the alternator (which, on the Honda, is at the left-hand end of the crankshaft) behind the cylinders. Cooling was improved by having air passages between the cylinders; the Sei had three Dell'Orto VHB 24 mm carburettors (the Honda CB 500 had four, for four cylinders). The vehicle appeared to reviewers as heavy and cumbersome but handled surprisingly well, and had a unique signature exhaust note from its six mufflers.

Production Frame numbers started at 5000. Production figures were as follows:

Series 1	1974	293	#5001-5293
Series 1	1975	1,479	from # 5294
Series 1, 2	1976	87	from # 6774
Series 2	1977	283	from # 6861
	1978	1,058	from # 7145
Sei 900
Series 1	1978	23	# 100001- 100023
Series 1	1979	515	# 100024- and up
Series 1/2	1980	322	# 100539- and up
Series 2	1981	312	# 100861- and up
Series 2/3	1982	176	# 101174- and up
Series 3	1983	26	# 101351- and up
Series 3	1984	106	# 101377- and up
Series 3	1985	25	# 101484- and up
Series 4	1986	200	# 101510- and up
Series 4	1987	88	# 101710- and up
Series 4	1988	0	# 101798- and up
Series 4	1989	85	# 101799- and up
Total production		1878	

The Benelli 750 Six / 900 Six remained the only six-cylinder motorcycle in production until the entrance of the Honda CBX in 1978.

== Benelli 900 Sei ==
Benelli 900 Sei
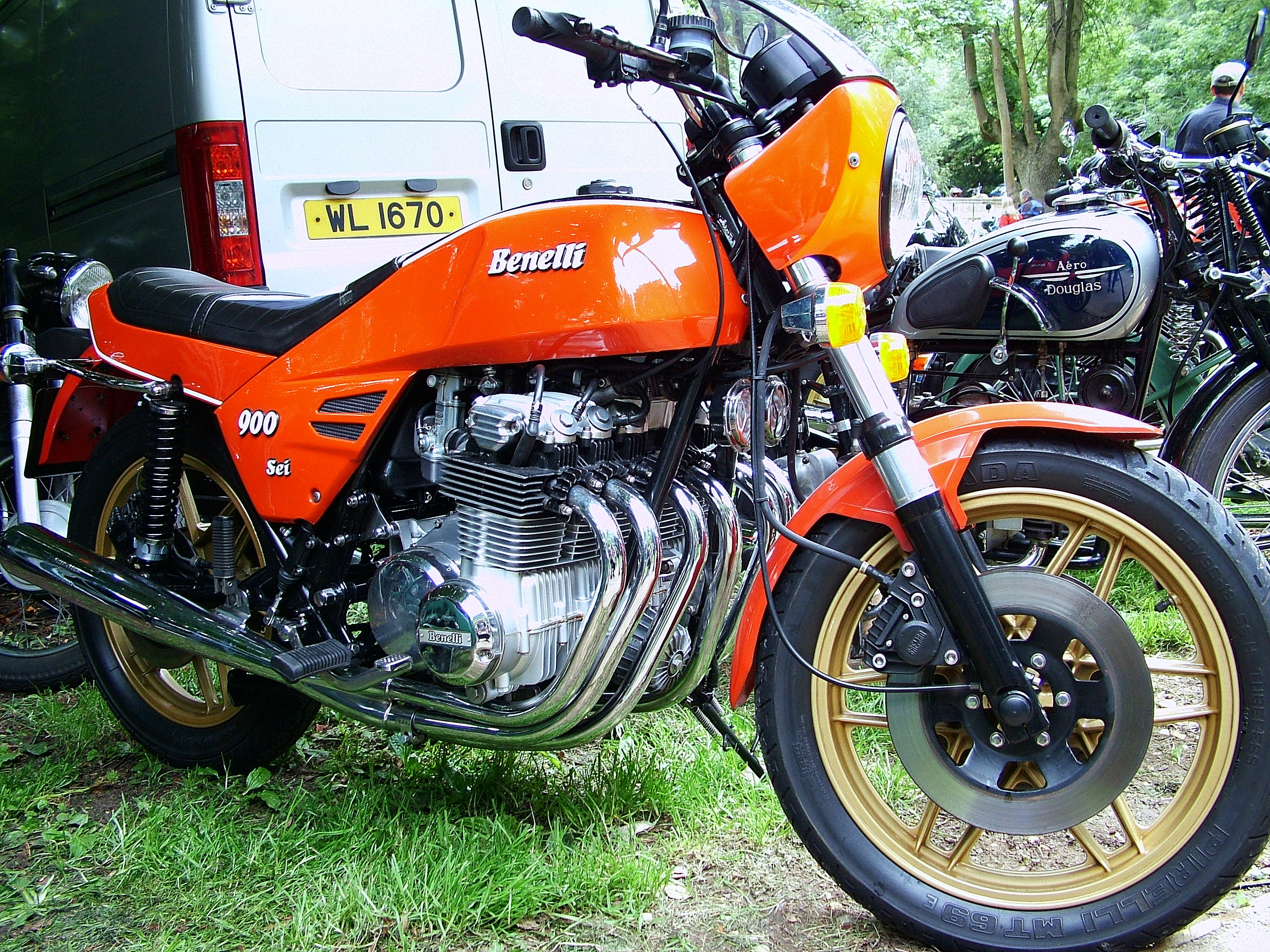
- Manufacturer: Benelli
- Parent company: F.LLi.Benelli S.p.A
- Production: 1979–1989
- Assembly: Italy: Pesaro
- Predecessor: Benelli 750 Sei
- Engine: 906 cc air-cooled inline-6
- Bore / stroke: 60 x 53.4 mm
- Compression ratio: 9.53:1
- Top speed: 120 mph
- Transmission: 5-speed, dry clutch
- Frame type: Duplex steel tube cradle
- Suspension: Front: 38 mm Marzocchi telescopic forks Rear: Twin shock
- Brakes: Front: Twin disc Rear: Single disc. Linked braking system same as the Moto Guzzi system of the period.
- Tires: Front 100/90 V 18 MT29 Rear 120/90 V 18 MT28
- Wheelbase: 56 inches (1,422 mm)
- Dimensions: L: 2.110 m W: 25.75 (654 mm)
- Weight: 220 kg (490 lb) (dry); 549 lbs (249 kg) (wet)
- Fuel capacity: 16.5 lt

In 1979, by which time Benellli had sold 3,200 vehicles, Benelli developed the 750 Sei into a 900 cc motorcycle by increasing bore and stroke, with six-into-two exhausts and a small bikini fairing taken from the Moto Guzzi Le Mans. Less than 2,000 were made over four model releases. Described at the time as "outrageous" or a "flashbike". Flashbikes tended to be "rare, expensive, European, quirky, handsome and high performance". It had an original MSRP of $3,995.

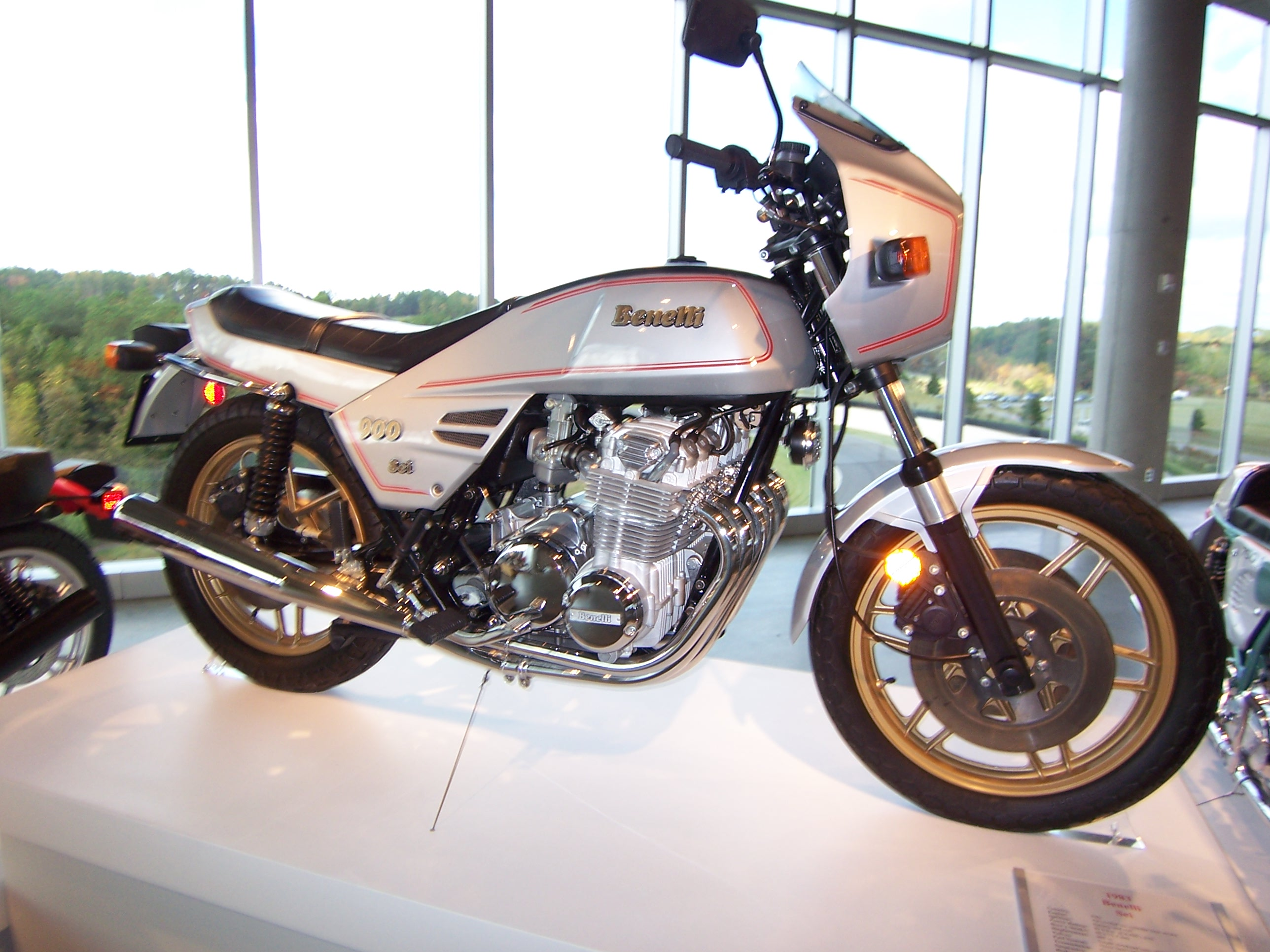
Benelli 900 Sei Sport

It was later released under the "Sei Sport" name, with a larger bikini fairing.

== See also ==
- List of Benelli motorcycles
