= Benelli Pepe =

Scooter produced by Benelli

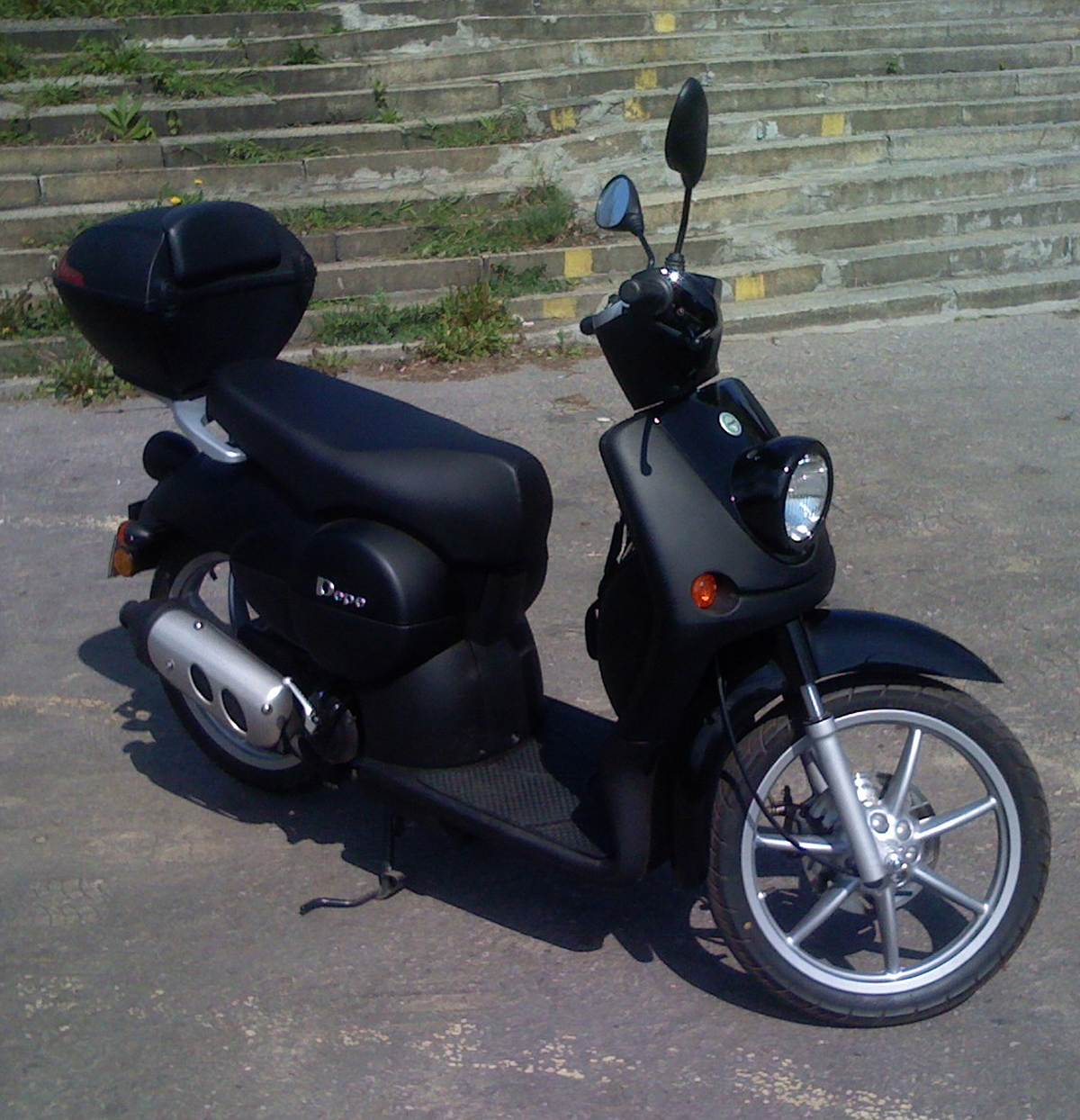
- Manufacturer: Benelli
- Also called: Renault Specimen; Benelli Andretti M50 (USA)
- Production: 1998–2015
- Assembly: Pesaro, Italy
- Class: Scooter
- Engine: 50 cm³ 100 cm³ 125 cm³

The Benelli Pepe is a scooter produced from 1998 to 2015 by the Italian motorcycle manufacturer Benelli.

It was also sold under the Renault brand as Renault Specimen.

== History ==
This is the first high-wheeled scooter with a 50 cm³ engine produced by Benelli which went into production in June in 1998. At the time, the model offered an original design with rounded shapes and the characteristic headlight circular encapsulated in the front as well as two-tone colors of the body to make it more trendy among the young audience.

It was designed to lower production costs, in fact it has a bodywork made in two single pieces and most of the components are in polypropylene, the front instead is in ABS. Very simple is the structure of the bridge with a simple chrome tube, bound to the chassis at the highest point of the front shield. The instrumentation was sparse with the absence of the fuel gauge but only the reserve warning light was present. The tank on the other hand has a capacity of 7.5 Liters.

The 50 cm³ engine is manufactured by Minarelli and is an air-cooled two-stroke engine.

The monorail frame has a double rear cradle with 16 "wheels.

The Braking System consists of a 220 mm front Disc and a 110mm Drum rear. At the debut in Italy only the single-seater version was available while abroad the two-seater homologation with longer saddle and passenger footrests was also available.

=== 2001 facelify ===
In September 2001 the first facelift made its debut and the range was renamed Pepe LX : the design changed with the renewed plastics and the more elegant appearance and the model equipped with the new 100 engine alongside the 50 was also introduced. Both engines are homologated Euro 1. The two-seater saddle is also optional on the 50 for the Italian market.

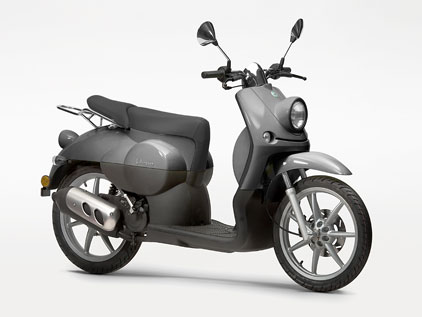
Benelli Pepe 50 Classic

Since 2002 an agreement has been made with the French manufacturer Renault and the Pepe is also sold as a Renault Specimen; the model is identical in that only the logo on the shield and the side plate is changed.

Production was interrupted in 2003 due to financial difficulties and after the purchase of Benelli by the Chinese group Qianjiang Motorcycle in late 2005 the production of Pepper restarts in Pesaro, (Italy) with the 2006 range consisting of the 50 base and from 50 LX approved according to the Euro 2 standard. The 100 is not relaunched due to low sales. The production of the Renault-branded twin continues as it is sold by the French company's sales network.

In 2007 the range expands with the Classic version which is none other than the 1998 pre-restyling model returned to production.

=== 2010 facelift ===
In May 2010 a new facelift of the Pepe 50 debuts, replacing the previous Pepe LX; the old Classic remains in production.

In November 2011 at the Milan show on the occasion of the centenary of Benelli the version 50 four-stroke was presented and went on sale in March 2012; this model supports the two-stroke version still in production.

At the show EICMA 2014 the new 2015 range is presented, consisting of 50 four-strokes and for the first time also in the 125 displacement. The old 50 two-stroke comes out.

The production ends in 2015 as the Benelli withdraws from the production of scooters focusing on sport motorcycles.
