= Benelli Imperiale 400 =

Retro-styled motorcycle introduced in 2019 by Benelli

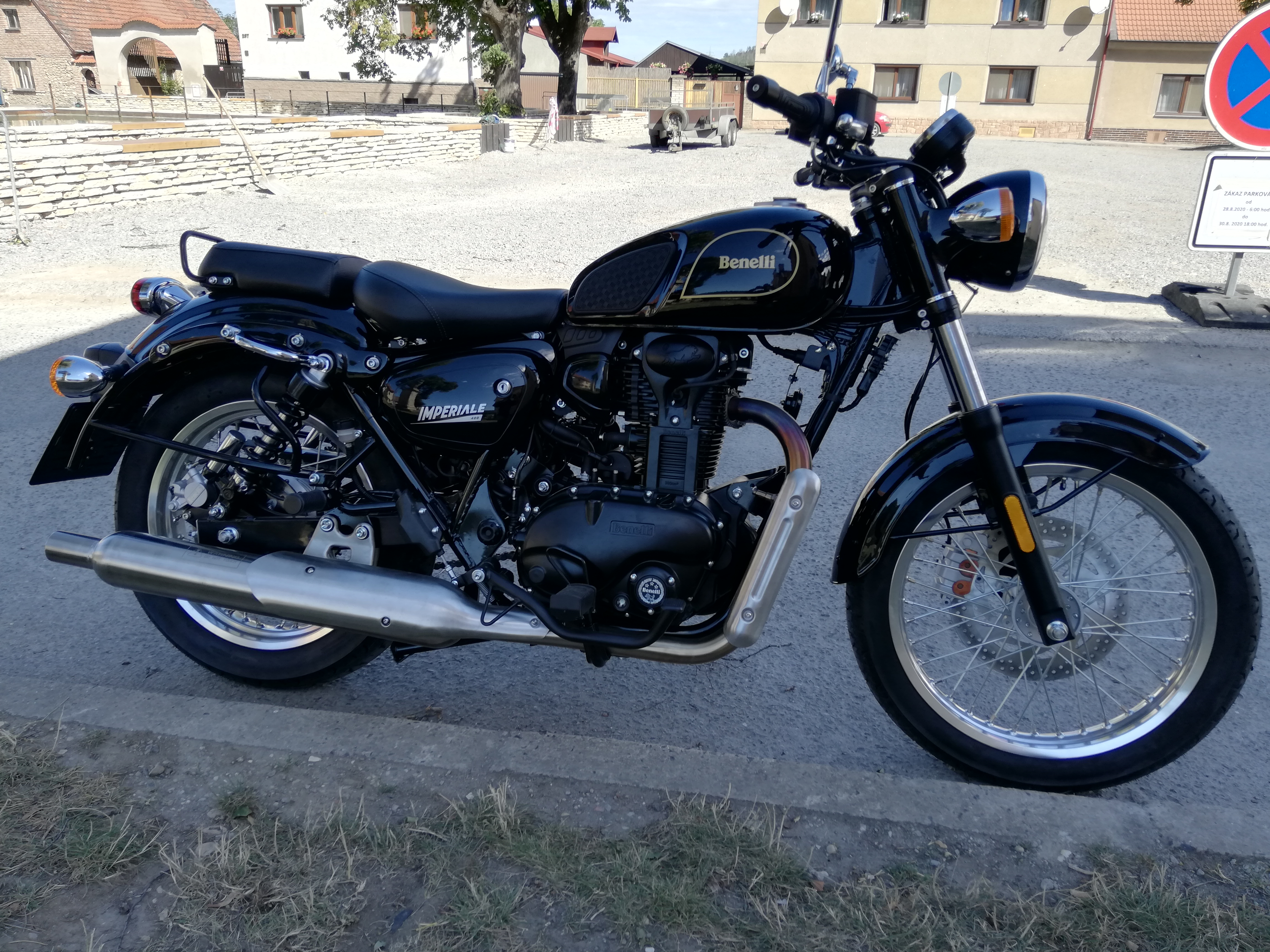
- Manufacturer: Benelli
- Production: 2019–2025
- Class: Standard / retro
- Engine: 374 cc (22.8 cu in), air-cooled, four-stroke, SOHC, single-cylinder
- Top speed: 120 km/h (75 mph) (est.)
- Power: 21 PS (15 kW; 21 hp) @ 5,500 rpm (claimed)
- Torque: 29 N⋅m (21 lb⋅ft) @ 4,500 rpm (claimed)
- Transmission: 5-speed, chain final drive
- Frame type: Steel double-cradle
- Suspension: Telescopic front fork; twin rear shocks (preload adjustable)
- Brakes: Front: 300 mm (12 in) disc; Rear: 240 mm (9.4 in) disc; dual-channel ABS
- Tires: Spoked wheels, front and rear
- Seat height: 780 mm (31 in)
- Fuel capacity: 12 L (2.6 imp gal; 3.2 US gal)

The Benelli Imperiale 400 is a retro-styled motorcycle produced by Benelli from 2019 to 2025. It is powered by a single-cylinder engine and is sold in markets including India and Europe.

== History and availability ==
The Imperiale 400 was launched in India in 2019. Media reports described it as one of the company's key products in the Indian market. In November 2020, India Today reported that Benelli India's retail sales had more than doubled compared with the previous year, with the Imperiale 400 cited as a major contributor.

== Design and specifications ==
The motorcycle has a steel double-cradle frame, a teardrop-shaped fuel tank, spoked wheels, chrome finishes, and a twin-pod analogue instrument cluster with an LCD inset.

== Engine and transmission ==
The Imperiale 400 uses a 374-cubic-centimetre (22.8 cu in) air-cooled, single-cylinder SOHC engine with fuel injection, producing about 21 PS (15 kW; 21 hp) at 5,500 rpm and 29 N⋅m (21 lb⋅ft) of torque at 4,500 rpm. It is paired with a 5-speed manual transmission with chain final drive. Braking is provided by a 300 mm (12 in) disc at the front and a 240 mm (9.4 in) disc at the rear, both with dual-channel ABS. Suspension consists of telescopic front forks and dual rear shocks with preload adjustment.

== Dimensions and performance ==
The motorcycle has a seat height of about 780 mm (31 in), ground clearance of 165 mm (6.5 in), and a fuel tank capacity of about 12 L (2.6 imp gal; 3.2 US gal). Its curb weight is about 205 kg (452 lb). The top speed is estimated at 120 km/h (75 mph), and reported fuel efficiency is 31–33 km/L.

== Market reception ==
Reviews in The Times of India and other outlets described the Imperiale 400 as a modern classic motorcycle positioned against the Royal Enfield Bullet 350. Coverage noted its styling and build quality, along with criticism of its weight and relatively modest performance compared with rivals.

== See also ==
- Benelli
- Royal Enfield Bullet 350
- Royal Enfield Classic
