= EICMA =

Motorcycle trade show in Milan

- Date: Annually
- Locations: FieraMilano, Rho, Milan, Italy
- Inaugurated: 3 May 1914
- Most recent: 7 November 2023 – 12 November 2023

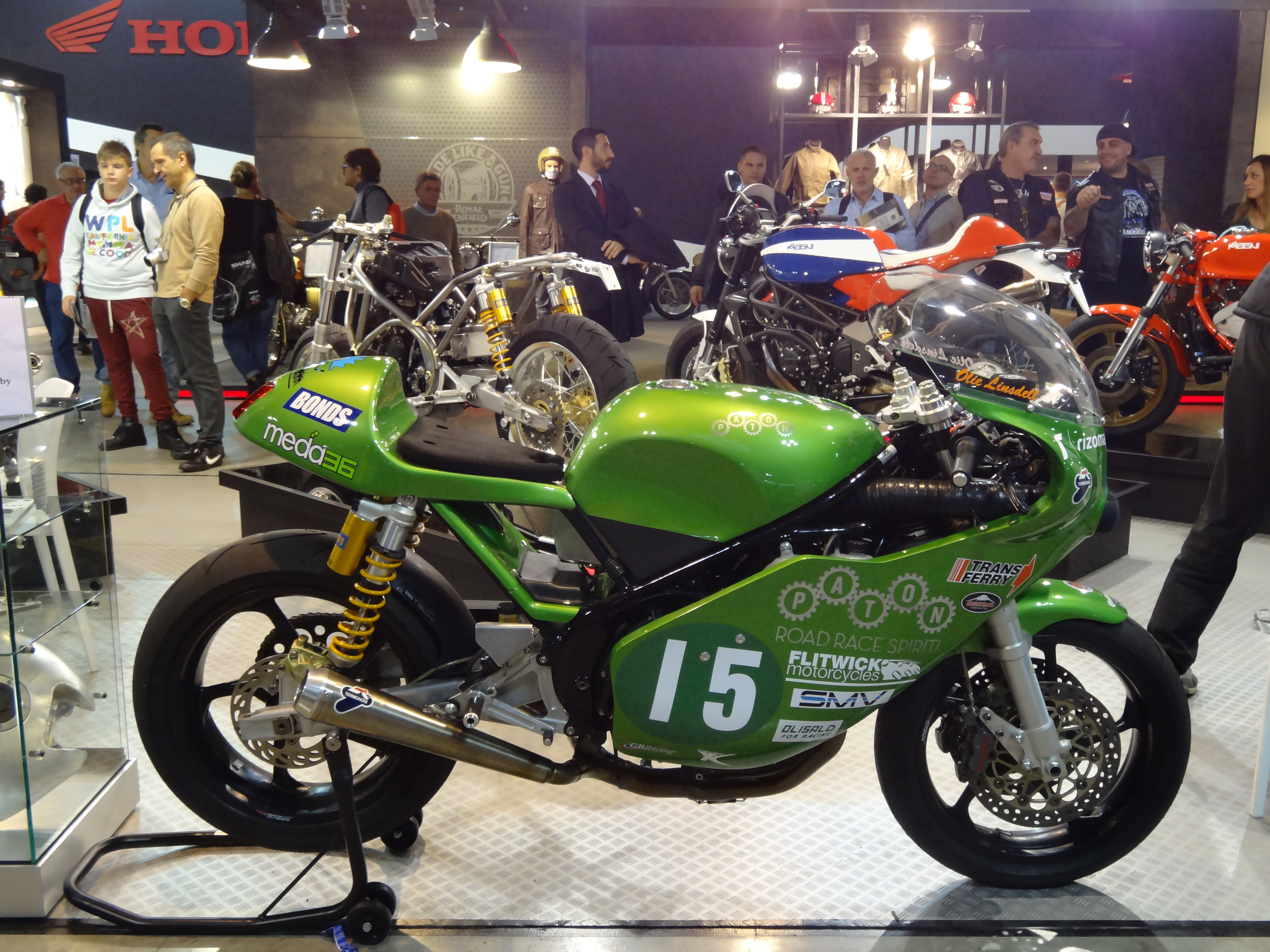
A motorcycle showcased in the show.

EICMA (Esposizione Internazionale Ciclo Motociclo e Accessori), or the Milan Motorcycle Shows is an annual trade show in Milan, Italy featuring motorcycles. The 2018 show drew over half a million visitors and more than 1,200 exhibiting brands. The show is frequently used by manufacturers to debut new models.

Organized by EICMA, the event is held annually in Milan, Italy, at the Fiera Milano Rho exhibition center. The exhibition typically spans six days: the first two days are reserved exclusively for trade visitors, while the remaining four days are open to the general public. While standard operating hours usually run from 09:30 to 18:30, the event historically features extended evening hours on the fourth day, remaining open until 22:00.
