= Dundrod Circuit =

Motorcycle street circuit in Northern Ireland

- Grand Prix Circuit (1965–present)
- Location: Lisburn, Northern Ireland
- Coordinates: 54°34′51″N 6°05′05″W
- Opened: 1950
- Major events: Grand Prix motorcycle racing Ulster Grand Prix (1953–1971); RAC Tourist Trophy (1950–1951, 1953–1955); Ulster Trophy (1950-1953, 1955); Sidecar World Championship (1953–1954, 1956, 1969–1971); Dundrod 150; Killinchy 150

Grand Prix Circuit (1965–present)
- Length: 11.910 km (7.401 mi)
- Turns: 25
- Race lap record: 3:15.316 ( (United Kingdom) Peter Hickman, BMW S1000RR, 2019, SBK)

Grand Prix Circuit (1950–1964)
- Length: 11.935 km (7.416 mi)
- Race lap record: 4:34.6 ( (United Kingdom) Mike Hailwood, MV Agusta 500 4C, 1963, 500cc)

Dundrod Circuit is a motorsport street circuit used for the Ulster Trophy for Formula One and Formula Two cars from 1950 to 1953, the RAC Tourist Trophy for sports cars between 1950 and 1955, and for the motorcycle Ulster Grand Prix from 1953 onwards. It is situated near the village of Dundrod in Lisburn, Northern Ireland. The nearby Clady Circuit also in County Antrim was used for the Ulster Grand Prix between (1922–1952) before moving to the Dundrod Circuit.

== History ==
The Dundrod Circuit in Co Antrim, first used in 1950 for the RAC Tourist Trophy automobile race and the Formula One (non-championship) Ulster Trophy (1950–1953), was 7.416 mi (11.935 km) in length and later amended for the 1965 racing season to 7.401 mi (11.911 km) with the addition of the Lindsay Hairpin. For the 1953 racing season the Clady Circuit was abandoned for motor-cycle racing and the Ulster Grand Prix as part of the FIM Motorcycle Grand Prix World Championship and was moved to the nearby Dundrod Circuit in Co Antrim. The circuit comprised public roads closed for racing including a section of the secondary B38 Hannahstown Road between Glenavy and Hannahstown, Co Antrim, the secondary B101 Leathemstown Road from Leathemstown Corner to Dundrod and the B154 Quarterland/Tornagrough Road from Cochranstown to the road junction of the B38 Upper Springsfield Road/Hannahstown Road at the Lindsay Hairpin. After 1955 cars stopped racing there due to no less than 3 fatalities during the 1955 TT race and safety concerns with the narrow, high-speed nature of the circuit, and since then it has only been used for motorcycle racing.

The photo below shows the original much tighter hairpin, with the modern hairpin, known now as the Lindsay Hairpin, being slightly further back up the road.

== Speed and race records ==
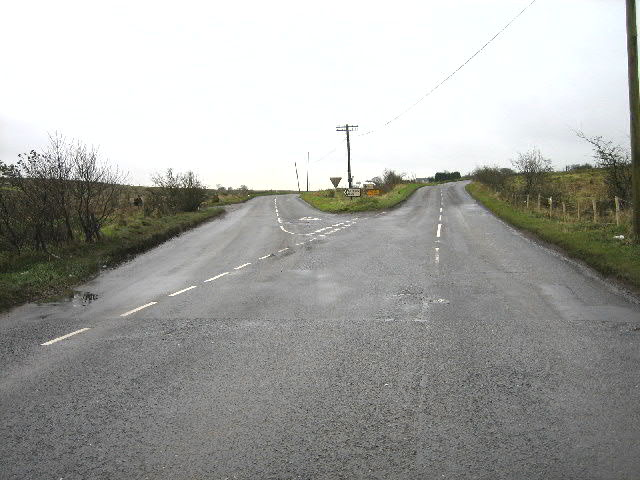
Original Hairpin

The lap record for the RAC Tourist Trophy on the Dundrod Circuit is 4 minutes and 42 seconds at an average speed of 94.67 mph (152.36 km/h) held by Mike Hawthorn driving a Jaguar D-Type set during the 1955 RAC Tourist Trophy. The race record for the RAC Tourist Trophy on the Dundrod Circuit is 7 hours, 3 minutes and 12 seconds an average speed of 88.32 mph (142.14 km/h) for 84 laps (622.96 miles/1002.518 km) during the 1955 RAC Tourist Trophy race held by the works Daimler-Benz entry of Stirling Moss/John Fitch driving a Mercedes-Benz 300 SLR.

The 1971 Ulster Grand Prix held on the Dundrod Circuit was won by Australian Jack Findlay in what was the Ulster Grand Prix's last year as part of the FIM Grand Prix international motorcycle racing calendar. Findlay's victory on a Suzuki was also notable for marking the first 500cc class win for a motorcycle powered by a two stroke engine.

=== Race lap records ===
The official lap record for the Dundrod Circuit is 3:15.316 set by Peter Hickman riding a BMW S1000RR during the 2019 Ulster Grand Prix. As of August 2019, the fastest official race lap records at the Dundrod Circuit are listed as:

Category	Time	Driver	Vehicle	Event
Full Circuit (1950–present): 11.910 km (7.401 mi)
Superbike	3:15.316	Peter Hickman	BMW S1000RR	2019 Ulster Grand Prix
500cc	4:08.600	Giacomo Agostini	MV Agusta 500 Three	1970 Ulster Grand Prix
350cc	4:13.600	Giacomo Agostini	MV Agusta 350 3C	1970 Ulster Grand Prix
250cc	4:21.400	Kel Carruthers	Yamaha 250 V4	1970 Ulster Grand Prix
125cc	4:27.000	Bill Ivy (Note: Both riders took the same lap time independently on different years.); Phil Read	Yamaha 125 V4	1967 Ulster Grand Prix; 1968 Ulster Grand Prix
Sports car racing	4:42.000	Mike Hawthorn	Jaguar D-type	1955 RAC Tourist Trophy
Formula One	4:44.000	Giuseppe Farina	Alfa Romeo 159	1951 Ulster Trophy
50cc	5:17.200	Ángel Nieto	Derbi 50	1970 Ulster Grand Prix

== See also ==
- Clady Circuit
- Ulster Grand Prix
- North West 200
- Isle of Man TT Races
- RAC Tourist Trophy
