= 1967 Grand Prix motorcycle racing season =

Sports season

1967 F.I.M. Grand Prix motorcycle racing season

Seasons
- ← 1966 1968 →

The 1967 Grand Prix motorcycle racing season was the 19th F.I.M. Road Racing World Championship Grand Prix season. The season consisted of thirteen Grand Prix races in six classes: 500cc, 350cc, 250cc, 125cc, 50cc and Sidecars 500cc. It began on 30 April, with the Spanish Grand Prix, and ended with Japanese Grand Prix on 15 October.

== Season summary ==
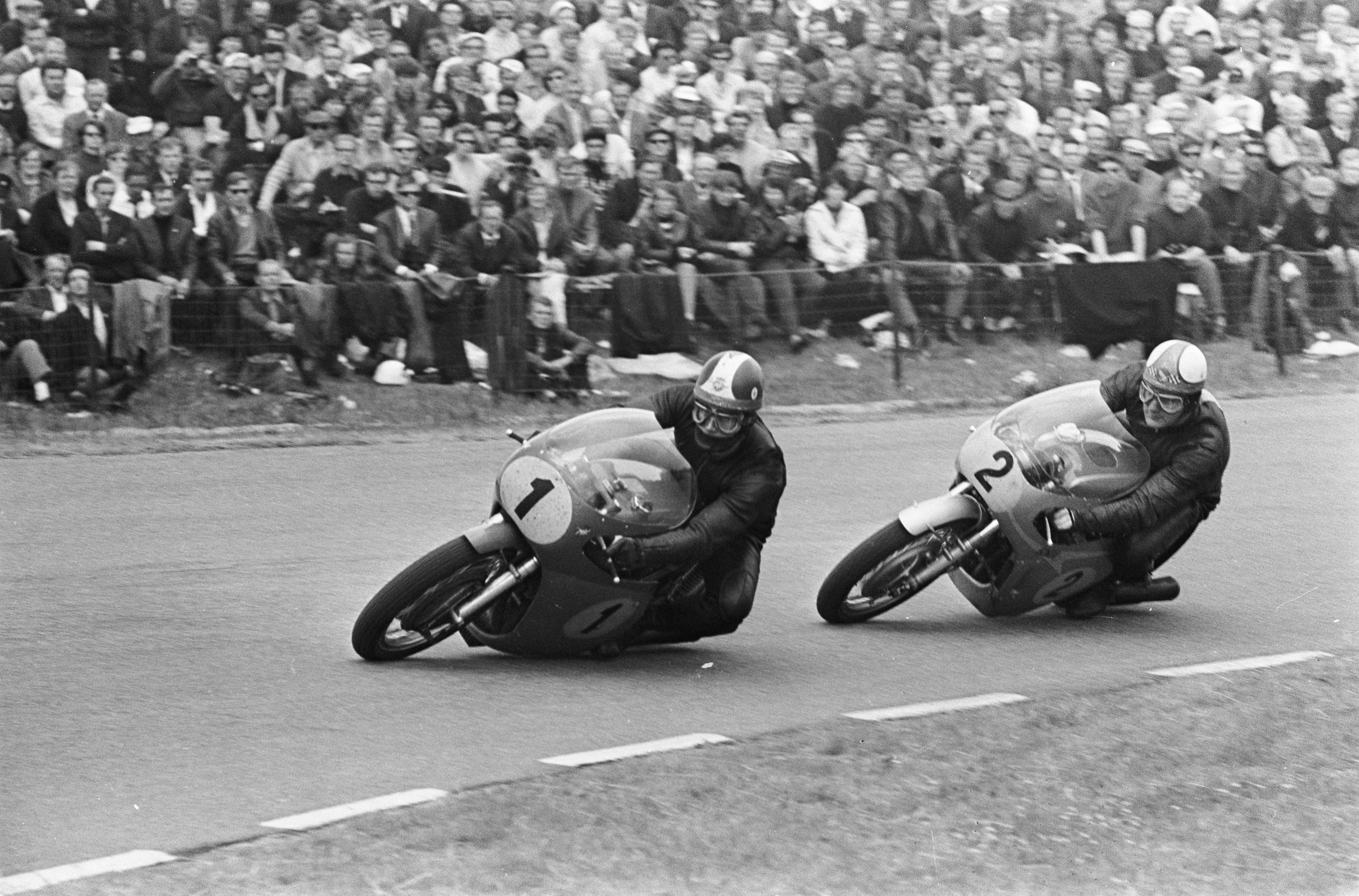
Agostini (1) and Mike Hailwood (2) dueling during the 1967 500cc Dutch TT.

1967 marked a seminal year in motorcycle Grand Prix history as well as the end of an era, with Honda making the decision to withdraw its racing program from competition. Nevertheless, Honda would go out with a bang, with Mike Hailwood taking the 250 cc and 350 cc crowns and coming within a whisker of dethroning Giacomo Agostini for the 500 cc title.

Honda decided to concentrate on the larger classes leaving Suzuki to dominate the 50 cc class with Anscheidt again the champion. The improved Yamahas took the 125 cc class, with Bill Ivy finishing ahead of teammate Phil Read.

In the 250 cc class, Read would battle Hailwood mightily for the title. They both finished the season with 50 points, but Hailwood took the title because he had five wins to Read's four. In the 350 cc class, Hailwood had an easier time, taking six wins and claiming the crown by mid-season.

The 500 title fight would be one for the ages, with Agostini and Hailwood swapping wins back and forth including a legendary duel at the Isle of Man TT. The chase went down to the last race in Canada. Hailwood won there to tie Agostini on points. Each rider had five wins so it came down to second places — Agostini taking the title with three seconds to Hailwood's two.

With Honda's pullout, Hailwood left motorcycle racing to take up a car racing career. He left in a blaze of glory, winning three classes in one day at the Dutch TT as well as three classes in one week at the Isle of Man TT.

== 1967 Grand Prix season calendar ==
Round	Date	Grand Prix	Circuit	50cc winner	125cc winner	250cc winner	350cc winner	500cc winner	Sidecars 500cc winner	Report
1	30 April	(Spain) Spanish Grand Prix	Montjuïc Circuit	(West Germany) Hans-Georg Anscheidt	(United Kingdom) Bill Ivy	(United Kingdom) Phil Read			(Germany) Auerbacher / Dein	Report
2	7 May	(West Germany) West German Grand Prix	Hockenheimring	(West Germany) Hans-Georg Anscheidt	(Japan) Yoshimi Katayama	(Northern Ireland) Ralph Bryans	(United Kingdom) Mike Hailwood	(Italy) Giacomo Agostini	(Germany) Enders / Engelhardt	Report
3	21 May	(France) French Grand Prix	Charade Circuit	(Japan) Yoshimi Katayama	(United Kingdom) Bill Ivy	(United Kingdom) Bill Ivy			(Germany) Enders / Engelhardt	Report
4	16 June	Isle of Man TT	Snaefell Mountain	(United Kingdom) Stuart Graham	(United Kingdom) Phil Read	(United Kingdom) Mike Hailwood	(United Kingdom) Mike Hailwood	(United Kingdom) Mike Hailwood	(Germany) Schauzu / Horst Schneider	Report
5	24 June	(Netherlands) Dutch TT	TT Circuit Assen	(Japan) Yoshimi Katayama	(United Kingdom) Phil Read	(United Kingdom) Mike Hailwood	(United Kingdom) Mike Hailwood	(United Kingdom) Mike Hailwood	(Germany) Enders / Engelhardt	Report
6	2 July	(Belgium) Belgian Grand Prix	Spa-Francorchamps	(West Germany) Hans-Georg Anscheidt		(United Kingdom) Bill Ivy		(Italy) Giacomo Agostini	(Germany) Enders / Engelhardt	Report
7	16 July	(East Germany) East German Grand Prix	Sachsenring		(United Kingdom) Bill Ivy	(United Kingdom) Phil Read	(United Kingdom) Mike Hailwood	(Italy) Giacomo Agostini		Report
8	23 July	(Czechoslovakia) Czechoslovak Grand Prix	Masaryk Circuit		(United Kingdom) Bill Ivy	(United Kingdom) Phil Read	(United Kingdom) Mike Hailwood	(United Kingdom) Mike Hailwood		Report
9	6 August	(Finland) Finnish Grand Prix	Imatra Circuit		(United Kingdom) Stuart Graham	(United Kingdom) Mike Hailwood		(Italy) Giacomo Agostini	(Germany) Enders / Engelhardt	Report
10	19 August	(Northern Ireland) Ulster Grand Prix	Dundrod Circuit		(United Kingdom) Bill Ivy	(United Kingdom) Mike Hailwood	(Italy) Giacomo Agostini	(United Kingdom) Mike Hailwood		Report
11	3 September	(Italy) Nations Grand Prix	Monza		(United Kingdom) Bill Ivy	(United Kingdom) Phil Read	(Northern Ireland) Ralph Bryans	(Italy) Giacomo Agostini	(Germany) (United Kingdom) Auerbacher / Nelson	Report
12	30 September	(Canada) Canadian Grand Prix	Mosport		(United Kingdom) Bill Ivy	(United Kingdom) Mike Hailwood		(United Kingdom) Mike Hailwood		Report
13	15 October	(Japan) Japanese Grand Prix	Fuji Speedway	(Japan) Mitsuo Itoh	(United Kingdom) Bill Ivy	(Northern Ireland) Ralph Bryans	(United Kingdom) Mike Hailwood			Report

== Standings ==
=== Scoring system ===
Points were awarded to the top six finishers in each race. Only the best of four were counted on 50cc championships, best of six in 350cc and 500cc championships, best of seven in 125cc and 250cc championships, and best of five in the Sidecars races.

Position	1st	2nd	3rd	4th	5th	6th
Points	8	6	4	3	2	1

==== 500cc final standings ====
Pos	Rider	Machine	GER (Germany)	MAN (Isle of Man)	HOL (Netherlands)	BEL (Belgium)	DDR (East Germany)	TCH (Czechoslovakia)	FIN (Finland)	ULS (Northern Ireland)	NAC (Italy)	CAN (Canada)	Pts
1	(Italy) Giacomo Agostini	MV Agusta	1	Ret	2	1	1	2	1	20	1	2	**46** (58)
2	(United Kingdom) Mike Hailwood	Honda	Ret	1	1	2	Ret	1	Ret	1	2	1	**46** (52)
3	(United Kingdom) John Hartle	Matchless / Kirby-Metisse		6			2	5	2	2	6		**22**
4	(United Kingdom) Peter Williams	Matchless	2	2	3	Ret							**16**
5	(Australia) Jack Findlay	Matchless / Norton	3	DNS		4	3	DNS		3	9		**15**
6	(United Kingdom) Fred Stevens	Hannah-Paton	Ret	5	Ret	3	Ret	Ret	5	Ret	4	Ret	**11**
7	(United Kingdom) John Cooper	Norton	16	4	Ret	12	Ret	3		6			**8**
8	(Switzerland) Gyula Marsovszky	Matchless	Ret	14	5	5	10	4	Ret	7	7		**7**
9	(United Kingdom) Billie Nelson	Norton	5		9	11	7	8	3		Ret		**6**
10	(United Kingdom) Steve Spencer	Norton		3			9	13		5	Ret		**6**
11	(Canada) Mike Duff	Matchless	8	Ret		Ret		Ret				3	**4**
12	(Italy) Angelo Bergamonti	Hannah-Paton		Ret	11						3		**4**
13	(Australia) John Dodds	Norton	Ret		10	8	4	6	9		Ret		**4**
=	(United Kingdom) Dan Shorey	Norton		Ret	4	9	6	10		Ret	8		**4**
15	(United Kingdom) Robin Fitton	Norton	4			7				Ret			**3**
16	(Sweden) Bo Granath	Matchless	15		17	14	12	Ret	4	15			**3**
17	(United Kingdom) John Blanchard	Seeley-Matchless / Seeley-URS	Ret	33		Ret				4			**3**
18	(Canada) Ivor Lloyd	Matchless										4	**3**
19	(United Kingdom) Rodney Gould	Norton		Ret			5	11	Ret	8			**2**
20	(Italy) Giuseppe Mandolini	Moto Guzzi									5		**2**
=	(South Africa) Andreas Georgeades	Velocette										5	**2**
22	(United Kingdom) Chris Conn	Norton	7	Ret	6	Ret	8	Ret		Ret	Ret		**1**
23	(United Kingdom) Derek Minter	Norton	Ret		7	6							**1**
24	(United Kingdom) Griff Jenkins	Norton	6		13								**1**
25	(United Kingdom) Maurice Hawthorne	Norton			Ret				6				**1**
26	(United States) Johnny Rockett	Norton										6	**1**
27	(United Kingdom) Lewis Young	Metisse / Matchless	Ret		Ret	Ret	Ret	14	7				**0**
28	(United Kingdom) Tom Dickie	Matchless		7									**0**
=	(Canada) Dave Lloyd	Triton										7	**0**
=	(Czech Republic) Frantisek Srna	Jawa						7					**0**
31	(Australia) Kel Carruthers	Metisse / Norton / Matchless	Ret	Ret	8	Ret	Ret	9	Ret	14	Ret		**0**
32	(Northern Ireland) Billy McCosch	Matchless		8						10			**0**
33	(New Zealand) Keith Turner	Matchless		24			13		8				**0**
34	(Canada) Manuel Radbord	Honda										8	**0**
35	(United Kingdom) Ron Chandler	Matchless	Ret	9	Ret	Ret		Ret					**0**
34	(Germany) Hartmut Allner	BMW	9										**0**
=	(Canada) Thomas de Mange	Matchless										9	**0**
=	(United Kingdom) Dave Degens	Matchless								9			**0**
38	(United Kingdom) Derek Lee	Matchless		10	12	Ret				12	12		**0**
39	(Germany) Walter Scheimann	Norton	10		Ret	13		12			Ret		**0**
40	(Australia) Jack Saunders	Matchless					14		10				**0**
41	(Germany) Karl Hoppe	Matchless	Ret		Ret	Ret	Ret				10		**0**
42	(Australia) Malcolm Stanton	Norton	Ret	Ret		10	Ret				Ret		**0**
43	(Canada) Jean Lysight	Triumph										10	**0**
44	(United Kingdom) Rex Butcher	Norton		11							11		**0**
45	(Finland) Hannu Kuparinen	Matchless					15		11				**0**
46	(United Kingdom) Godfrey Nash	Norton			Ret		11	Ret					**0**
47	(United Kingdom) Denis Gallagher	Matchless		Ret						11			**0**
48	(United States) Bob MacLean	Norton										11	**0**
=	(Germany) Armand Nerger	Honda	11										**0**
50	(Canada) Henry Hanje	Triumph										12	**0**
51	(Canada) Oliver Howe	Norton			Ret				12		16		**0**
52	(United Kingdom) Barry Randle	Norton		12									**0**
=	(Germany) Dietmar Völmle	Norton	12										**0**
54	(Switzerland) Ernst Weiss	Matchless								18	13		**0**
55	(Germany) Fritjof Eccarius	Matchless	13				Ret						**0**
=	(United Kingdom) Bill Smith	Matchless		13						Ret			**0**
57	(Northern Ireland) Cecil Crawford	Norton								13			**0**
=	(Canada) David Shepard	Norton										13	**0**
59	(Hungary) György Kurucz	Matchless / Norton	14								14		**0**
60	(Belgium) Guy Cooremans	Norton				15							**0**
=	(South Africa) Errol Cowan	Matchless			15								**0**
=	(South Africa) Pat Hewartson	Norton									15		**0**
=	(United Kingdom) Charlie Sanby	Norton		15									**0**
64	(Rhodesia) Gordon Keith	Norton		21	16					Ret			**0**
65	(United Kingdom) Bob Steele	Matchless		Ret						16			**0**
66	(United Kingdom) Tony McGurk	Matchless		16									**0**
67	(Italy) Gianfranco Domeniconi	Norton									17		**0**
=	(United Kingdom) Steve Jolly	Matchless		17									**0**
=	(Australia) Ron Wilson	Norton								17			**0**
70	(Netherlands) Bert Oosterhuis	Norton			18								**0**
=	(United Kingdom) Brian Walmsley	Norton		18									**0**
=	(Italy) Benedetto Zambotti	Norton									18		**0**
73	(United Kingdom) Ken Kay	Matchless-Metisse		Ret						19			**0**
74	(United Kingdom) Bernie Lund	Matchless		19									**0**
=	(Italy) Emanuele Maugliani	Norton									19		**0**
76	(United Kingdom) Norman Price	Norton		20									**0**
77	(Northern Ireland) Roy Reid	Norton		28						21			**0**
78	(South Africa) Ian Burne	Norton		22		Ret							**0**
79	(Northern Ireland) Harry Turner	Norton								22			**0**
80	(Sweden) Billy Andersson	Matchless		23									**0**
81	(Australia) Lee Atlee	Norton		25		Ret							**0**
82	(United Kingdom) Doug Cash	Norton		26									**0**
83	(United Kingdom) Ray Knight	Triumph		27									**0**
84	(United Kingdom) Colin Thompson	Norton		29									**0**
85	(United Kingdom) Albert Moule	Norton		30									**0**
86	(United Kingdom) Chris Neve	Matchless		31									**0**
87	(United Kingdom) Ian Ablett	BSA		32									**0**
88	(Australia) David Johnson	Norton		34									**0**
89	(United Kingdom) Albert Haddock	Triton		35									**0**
90	(United Kingdom) Hugh Evans	MV Agusta		36									**0**
91	(United Kingdom) Melvyn Rice	Vincent HRD		37									**0**
-	(United Kingdom) Joe Dunphy	Norton	Ret	Ret			Ret	Ret		Ret			**0**
-	(Austria) Edy Lenz	Matchless	Ret		Ret	Ret					Ret		**0**
-	(Australia) Eric Hinton	Norton				Ret	Ret		Ret				**0**
-	(Australia) Tom Gill	Matchless		Ret						Ret			**0**
-	(Wales) Malcolm Uphill	Norton		Ret						Ret			**0**
-	(Canada) Stuart Morin	Norton	Ret				Ret						**0**
-	(United Kingdom) Jim Ashton	Matchless		Ret									**0**
-	(United States) Nishan Baronian	BSA										Ret	**0**
-	(Canada) Roger Beaumont	Triumph										Ret	**0**
-	(United Kingdom) Godfrey Benson	Norton		Ret									**0**
-	(Hungary) Karoly Berek	Norton					Ret						**0**
-	(United Kingdom) Bob Biscardine	Triton		Ret									**0**
-	(New Zealand) Ray Breingan	Norton		Ret									**0**
-	(United Kingdom) Dave Brown	Norton		Ret									**0**
-	(Germany) Heiner Butz	Bianchi	Ret										**0**
-	(Italy) Paolo Campanelli	Matchless									Ret		**0**
-	(United Kingdom) Alan Capstick	BSA		Ret									**0**
-	(Sweden) Agne Carlsson	Matchless						Ret					**0**
-	(Canada) Bert Clark	Matchless-Metisse		Ret									**0**
-	(United Kingdom) Dave Croxford	Matchless		Ret									**0**
-	(United Kingdom) Dave Cunningham	Triumph										Ret	**0**
-	(United Kingdom) Peter Darvill	Norton		Ret									**0**
-	(Canada) Peter-John Davis	Norton										Ret	**0**
-	(Canada) Bruce Dent	Norton										Ret	**0**
-	(Switzerland) Herbert Denzler	Aermacchi							Ret				**0**
-	(United Kingdom) Vincent Duckett	Matchless		Ret									**0**
-	(Canada) Yvon Duhamel	Matchless										Ret	**0**
-	(United Kingdom) Jim Evans	Norton		Ret									**0**
-	(Canada) Kurt Fischer	Vincent HRD										Ret	**0**
-	(Canada) Robert Fisher	Triumph										Ret	**0**
-	(United Kingdom) Dave Foulkes	Norton		Ret									**0**
-	(United Kingdom) Tony Godfrey	Norton								Ret			**0**
-	(United States) Ron Grant	Honda										Ret	**0**
-	(Wales) Selwyn Griffiths	Matchless		Ret									**0**
-	(Northern Ireland) Billie Guthrie	Norton								Ret			**0**
-	(Canada) Don Haddow	Honda										Ret	**0**
-	(Czech Republic) Gustav Havel	Jawa						Ret					**0**
-	(United Kingdom) Vic Hilton	Norton		Ret									**0**
-	(United Kingdom) Derek Jones	BSA		Ret									**0**
-	(Canada) Peter Kellond	Norton										Ret	**0**
-	(United Kingdom) Les Kempster	Norton		Ret									**0**
-	(Canada) Ken King	Norton										Ret	**0**
-	(United States) Ed LaBelle	Norton										Ret	**0**
-	(Canada) Joseph Lama	Matchless										Ret	**0**
-	(United Kingdom) Alan Lawton	Norton		Ret									**0**
-	(Finland) Pentti Lehtelä	Norton							Ret				**0**
-	(United States) Kurt Liebmann	BMW OL Special										Ret	**0**
-	(Sweden) Jack Lindh	Matchless								Ret			**0**
-	(United States) Marty Lunde	Norton		Ret									**0**
-	(Canada) Mike Manley	Honda										Ret	**0**
-	(Canada) Fraser McAninch	Norton										Ret	**0**
-	(Northern Ireland) Ian McGregor	Norton								Ret			**0**
-	(Italy) Guido Miele	Gilera									Ret		**0**
-	(United Kingdom) Stephen Millard	Matchless		Ret									**0**
-	(United Kingdom) Frank Mumford	Norton							Ret				**0**
-	(South Africa) Garth Neveling	Norton		Ret									**0**
-	(Italy) Renzo Pasolini	Benelli		Ret									**0**
-	(United Kingdom) Alan Peck	Norton		Ret									**0**
-	(United Kingdom) Graham Penny	Honda		Ret									**0**
-	(Italy) Giovanni Perrone	Bianchi									Ret		**0**
-	(United Kingdom) Laurence Povey	Norton		Ret									**0**
-	(United Kingdom) Alan Prange	Matchless		Ret									**0**
-	(United Kingdom) Tom Read	Norton		Ret									**0**
-	(United Kingdom) Harry Reynolds	Matchless-Metisse		Ret									**0**
-	(Australia) Peter Richards	Norton		Ret									**0**
-	(United Kingdom) Tony Rutter	Norton		Ret									**0**
-	(Finland) Jouko Ryhänen	Matchless					Ret						**0**
-	(United Kingdom) Brian Sapsford	Norton								Ret			**0**
-	(United Kingdom) Barry Scully	Norton		Ret									**0**
-	(Canada) Adrian Shelley	Norton										Ret	**0**
-	(United Kingdom) Eric-Morley Shepherd	Norton		Ret									**0**
-	(United Kingdom) John Simmonds	Norton		Ret									**0**
-	(United States) Fred Simone	BMW										Ret	**0**
-	(Denmark) Vagn Stevnhoved	Matchless				Ret							**0**
-	(Netherlands) Jan Strijbis	Norton		Ret									**0**
-	(United Kingdom) Percy Tait	Triumph								Ret			**0**
-	(United Kingdom) John Taylor	Matchless		Ret									**0**
-	(United Kingdom) Tom Walker	Norton-BSA		Ret									**0**
-	(Canada) William Walsh	Norton										Ret	**0**
-	(United Kingdom) Carl Ward	Norton		Ret									**0**
-	(United States) Lance Weil	Matchless		Ret									**0**
-	(United Kingdom) Tony Wilmott	Norton		Ret									**0**
-	(United Kingdom) Dave Williams	BSA		Ret									**0**
-	(New Zealand) Keith Williams	Norton		Ret									**0**
Pos	Rider	Bike	GER (Germany)	MAN (United Kingdom)	HOL (Netherlands)	BEL (Belgium)	DDR (East Germany)	TCH (Czechoslovakia)	FIN (Finland)	ULS (Ulster)	NAC (Italy)	CAN (Canada)	Pts

Colour	Result
Gold	Winner
Silver	Second place
Bronze	Third place
Green	Points classification
Blue	Non-points classification
Blue	Non-classified finish (NC)
Purple	Retired, not classified (Ret)
Red	Did not qualify (DNQ)
Red	Did not pre-qualify (DNPQ)
Black	Disqualified (DSQ)
White	Did not start (DNS)
White	Withdrew (WD)
White	Race cancelled (C)
Blank	Did not practice (DNP)
Blank	Did not arrive (DNA)
Blank	Excluded (EX)

**Bold** – Pole
Italics – Fastest lap

==== 350cc final standings ====
Place	Rider	Number	Country	Machine	Points	Wins
1	(United Kingdom) Mike Hailwood	1	United Kingdom	Honda	40	6
2	(Italy) Giacomo Agostini	2	Italy	MV Agusta	32	1
3	(United Kingdom) Ralph Bryans		United Kingdom	Honda	20	1
4	(East Germany) Heinz Rosner	7	East Germany	MZ	18	0
5	(United Kingdom) Derek Woodman		United Kingdom	MZ	14	0
6	(Italy) Alberto Pagani	6	Italy	Aermacchi	11	0
7	(Australia) Kel Carruthers	18	Australia	Aermacchi	9	0
8	(Italy) Renzo Pasolini	3	Italy	Benelli	8	0
9	(Italy) Silvio Grassetti	11	Italy	Benelli	6	0
10	(Japan) K. Mimuro		Japan	Yamaha	4	0

==== 250cc final standings ====
Place	Rider	Number	Country	Machine	Points	Wins
1	(United Kingdom) Mike Hailwood	1	United Kingdom	Honda	50	5
2	(United Kingdom) Phil Read	2	United Kingdom	Yamaha	50	4
3	(United Kingdom) Bill Ivy	13	United Kingdom	Yamaha	46	2
4	(United Kingdom) Ralph Bryans		United Kingdom	Honda	40	2
5	(United Kingdom) Derek Woodman	4	United Kingdom	MZ	18	0
6	(East Germany) Heinz Rosner	6	East Germany	MZ	13	0
7	(New Zealand) Ginger Molloy	11	New Zealand	Bultaco	9	0
8	(Switzerland) Gyula Marsovsky	12	Switzerland	Bultaco	8	0
9	(Japan) Akiyasu Motohashi	8	Japan	Yamaha	6	0
10	(United Kingdom) Tommy Robb	22	United Kingdom	Bultaco	5	0
10	(United Kingdom) Dave Simmonds		United Kingdom	Kawasaki	5	0

=== 125cc ===
==== Riders' standings ====
Pos.	Rider	Bike	ESP (Spain)	FRG (West Germany)	FRA (France)	MAN (Isle of Man)	NED (Netherlands)	GDR (East Germany)	TCH (Czechoslovakia)	FIN (Finland)	ULS (Northern Ireland)	NAT (Italy)	CAN (Canada)	JPN (Japan)	Pts
1	(United Kingdom) Bill Ivy	Yamaha	1**^{F}**	NC**^{F}**	1**^{F}**		2**^{F}**	1**^{F}**	1	2**^{F}**	1**^{F}**	1**^{F}**	1**^{F}**	1**^{F}**	56 (76)
2	(United Kingdom) Phil Read	Yamaha	2		2	1**^{F}**	1	2			2				40
3	(United Kingdom) Stuart Graham	Suzuki	4		4	2	3	3	2	1	3			2	38 (44)
4	(Japan) Yoshimi Katayama	Suzuki	3	1	3		4		NC**^{F}**						19
5	(Hungary) László Szabó	MZ		3				6	3			3			13
6	(West Germany) Hans-Georg Anscheidt	Suzuki		2								2			12
7	(United Kingdom) Dave Simmonds	Kawasaki			5	4				3					9
8	(Australia) Kel Carruthers	Honda				5				5	4				7
9	(Canada) Tim Coopey	Yamaha											2		6
10	(East Germany) Thomas Heuschkel	MZ						5	4						5
10	(West Germany) Walter Scheimann	Honda							5			4			5
12	(Japan) Akiyasu Motohashi	Yamaha				3									4
12	(United States) Robert Lusk	Yamaha											3		4
12	(Japan) Hideo Kanaya	Kawasaki												3	4
15	(Italy) Walter Villa	Montesa		4											3
15	(East Germany) Klaus Enderlein	MZ						4							3
15	(East Germany) Jürgen Lenk	MZ								4					3
15	(Canada) Jean-Guy Duval	Yamaha											4		3
15	(Japan) Isao Morishita	Suzuki												4	3
20	(United Kingdom) Jim Curry	Honda				6			6			6			3
21	(Italy) Francesco Villa	Montesa	5												2
21	(Spain) José Maria Busquets	Montesa		5											2
21	(Netherlands) Cees van Dongen	Honda					5								2
21	(Australia) Kevin Cass	Bultaco									5				2
21	(Italy) Giovanni Burlando	Honda										5			2
21	(United States) Ralph Swegan	Yamaha											5		2
21	(Japan) Yasuho Shigeno	Bridgestone												5	2
28	(Spain) José Medrano	Bultaco	6												1
28	(West Germany) Herbert Mann	MZ		6											1
28	(France) Jean-Louis Vergnais	Bultaco			6										1
28	(United Kingdom) Rex Avery	EMC					6								1
28	(East Germany) Hartmut Bischoff	MZ								6					1
28	(New Zealand) Ginger Molloy	Bultaco									6				1
28	(United States) Robert Messina	Yamaha											6		1
28	(Australia) Barry Smith	Bultaco												6	1
Pos.	Rider	Bike	ESP (Spain)	FRG (West Germany)	FRA (France)	MAN (Isle of Man)	NED (Netherlands)	GDR (East Germany)	TCH (Czechoslovakia)	FIN (Finland)	ULS (Northern Ireland)	NAT (Italy)	CAN (Canada)	JPN (Japan)	Pts

Race key
Colour	Result
Gold	Winner
Silver	2nd place
Bronze	3rd place
Green	Points finish
Blue	Non-points finish
Blue	Non-classified finish (NC)
Purple	Retired (Ret)
Red	Did not qualify (DNQ)
Black	Disqualified (DSQ)
White	Did not start (DNS)
White	Withdrew (WD)
White	Race cancelled (C)
Blank	Did not practice (DNP)
Blank	Excluded (EX)
Blank	Did not arrive (DNA)
Blank	Did not enter (empty cell)
Annotation	Meaning
P	Pole position
F	Fastest lap
Rider key
Colour	Meaning
Light blue	Rookie rider

==== Constructors' standings ====
Each constructor is awarded the same number of points as their best placed rider in each race.

Pos.	Constructor	ESP (Spain)	FRG (West Germany)	FRA (France)	MAN (Isle of Man)	NED (Netherlands)	GDR (East Germany)	TCH (Czechoslovakia)	FIN (Finland)	ULS (Northern Ireland)	NAT (Italy)	CAN (Canada)	JPN (Japan)	Pts
1	(Japan) Yamaha	1		1	1	1	1	1	2	1	1	1	1	56 (86)
2	(Japan) Suzuki	3	1	3	2	3	3	2	1	3	2		2	44 (60)
3	(East Germany) MZ		3				4	3	4		3			18
4	(Japan) Honda				5	5		5	5	4	4			14
5	(Japan) Kawasaki			5	4				3				3	13
6	(Spain) Montesa	5	4											5
7	(Spain) Bultaco	6		6						5			6	5
8	(Japan) Bridgestone												5	2
9	(United Kingdom) EMC					6								1
Pos.	Constructor	ESP (Spain)	FRG (West Germany)	FRA (France)	MAN (Isle of Man)	NED (Netherlands)	GDR (East Germany)	TCH (Czechoslovakia)	FIN (Finland)	ULS (Northern Ireland)	NAT (Italy)	CAN (Canada)	JPN (Japan)	Pts

==== 50cc final standings ====
Place	Rider	Number	Country	Machine	Points	Wins
1	(West Germany) Hans-Georg Anscheidt	1	West Germany	Suzuki	30	3
2	(Japan) Yoshimi Katayama	5	Japan	Suzuki	28	2
3	(United Kingdom) Stuart Graham		United Kingdom	Suzuki	22	1
4	(Spain) Angel Nieto	6	Spain	Derbi	12	0
5	(Australia) Barry Smith	8	Australia	Derbi	12	0
6	(Japan) Mitsuo Itoh		Japan	Suzuki	8	1
7	(West Germany) R. Schmalze		West Germany	Kreidler	6	0
8	(Spain) José Busquet		Spain	Derbi	4	0
8	(Spain) Benjamin Grau		Spain	Derbi	4	0
8	(Japan) Hiroyuki Kawasaki		Japan	Suzuki	4	0
8	(United Kingdom) Tommy Robb		United Kingdom	Suzuki	4	0
