= Ron Grant (motorcyclist) =

American motorcycle racer (1940–2094)

- Grant wearing Suzuki leathers at an American race meeting in 1968
- Nationality: United States
- Born: February 20, 1940; East Croydon, England
- Died: December 27, 1994 (aged 54); Strangford Lough, Northern Ireland
Motorcycle racing career statistics
Grand Prix motorcycle racing
Active years	1964, 1967, US Team Suzuki member 1970 – 1974.
First race	1964 250cc United States Grand Prix
Last race	1967 Canadian Grand Prix
Team	Suzuki
Championships	0
Starts / Wins / Podiums / Poles / F. laps / Points; 2 / 0 / 1 / 0 / 0 / 1

Ronald J. Grant (20 February 1940 – 27 December 1994) was a British-born American professional motorcycle racer and racing team manager. He competed in the AMA road racing national championships during the 1960s and early 1970s. In 1964, he became the first American competitor to finish on the podium in a World Championship Grand Prix road race, when he finished in second place at the 250cc United States Grand Prix, held at the Daytona International Speedway. After his racing career, Grant became a racing team manager and respected engine tuner.

== Motorcycle racing career ==
=== Early British racing career ===
Grant was born in East Croydon, South London on February 20, 1940. His father was an avid follower of motorcycle speedway racing and named his son after speedway racer Ron Johnson. As a young boy, he attended speedway races with his father at New Cross Stadium, where he cheered for his idol Johnson and dreamed of becoming a racer himself.

Grant saved money from working two jobs before purchasing his first motorcycle at the age of 16, a 1929 600cc BSA Sloper. Afterwards, he purchased a 1957 600cc Norton, on which he entered his first official race held at the Thruxton Circuit and finished in second place. Grant became focused on becoming a professional motorcycle racer, putting most of his personal funds into racing activities and his motorcycles. He purchased a Norton Manx from fellow competitor, Derek Minter. Grant competed in the 1961 Manx Grand Prix, but failed to finish the race.

Through an American friend, Grant received a job offer at a motorcycle garage in Hollywood, California, and in November 1961 at the age of 21, he loaded his Norton Manx aboard the SS Rotterdam and emigrated to the United States.

=== AMA racing ===
Grant began competing and winning semi-professional road races organized by the American Federation of Motorcyclists (AFM), riding a 250cc Parilla motorcycle. He was known for his smooth riding style, rarely setting a foot wrong or suffering from crashes. His successful performances in AFM races qualified him to compete in the 1963 United States Grand Prix where he finished second to Yamaha factory rider Fumio Ito.

In 1964, the FIM upgraded the Daytona race to world championship status by making it the opening round of the 1964 Grand Prix motorcycle racing season. A feud between the FIM and the AMA meant that AMA competitors such as Gary Nixon, Dick Mann and Roger Reiman were prevented from entering the FIM sanctioned event. Grant, by then a naturalized American citizen, became the first American competitor to finish on the podium in a World Championship Grand Prix road race, when he finished in second place behind Alan Shepherd (MZ) at the 1964 250cc United States Grand Prix. He also had an impressive victory at the 1964 Dodge City National, where he won the 250cc Amateur Class after starting the race from the last row on the grid.

Grant was offered a contract to race for Suzuki's American distributor in 1965. He rode the new Suzuki X6 to a third place behind Cal Rayborn (Harley-Davidson) and Dick Mann (Matchless) in the 1966 250cc Carlsbad, California national race. Grant participated in the 1967 Canadian Grand Prix at the Mosport Circuit, taking over Gary Nixon's Daytona-winning Triumph T100R when the latter was forced to ride the Oklahoma City National in order to clinch the AMA Grand National Championship. He was battling for third place behind the leading duo of Mike Hailwood and Giacomo Agostini, when he crashed out of the 500cc race. In the 250cc Canadian Grand Prix, Grant placed sixth riding a Yamaha TD1.

At the 1968 Daytona 200, Grant put in an impressive performance riding an underpowered Suzuki T500 two-stroke motorcycle against larger and more powerful 750cc four-stroke motorcycles. Despite starting on the last row of the starting grid and making two pit stops for fuel, he managed to climb to fifth place by the end of the race.

In 1969, Grant traveled to New Zealand to compete in road races run over the Christmas/New Year period. New Zealand Suzuki distributor Rod Coleman had watched Ron competing during the 1969 AMA race season. Coleman was a former Grand Prix racer who had won the 1954 Isle of Man Junior TT. Coleman and Grant agreed on a deal whereby Grant was to compete in New Zealand over the 1969/70 race season. Ron brought the American Suzuki Team TR250 and TR500 with him. He returned again on a TR750 Suzuki in 1972.

Grant performed even better in the 1969 Daytona 200 where he was lying in second place behind Cal Rayborn, when he suffered a near disaster during a fuel stop after his pit attendant failed to tighten the fuel tank cap. As he exited the pits, fuel spilled on the rear tire causing him to crash and dropping him to 15th place. Grant was able to remount his motorcycle and rode impressively through the field to reclaim second place behind Rayborn by the end of the race. The Suzuki T500 began to show its potential at the National road race in Indianapolis, when both Grant and his teammate Art Baumann finished in second and third places behind Cal Rayborn.

Grant then took his Suzuki motorcycles to the Bonneville Salt Flats and set three land speed records for stock production motorcycles, as well as modified, partially streamlined motorcycles.

At the final road race of the season held at Sears Point Raceway, Baumann and Grant were running in first and second places, however Grant had placed such confidence in his Suzuki, that he neglected to service the motorcycle after his land speed records and a mechanical failure forced him to abandon the race. Baumann went on to score the first AMA National road racing victory for the Suzuki factory.

By the beginning of the 1970s, the Daytona 200 motorcycle race had become one of the most prestigious motorcycle races in the world, as manufacturers fought for shares of the burgeoning American motorcycle market fueled by the baby boomer generation. The race attracted road racing world champions such as Mike Hailwood and Kel Carruthers, and attendance began to surge with a record 30,000 spectators in 1970. At the 1970 Daytona 200, Grant was in first place at the 20-lap mark and appeared to be heading to victory, when his motorcycle ran out of fuel one lap before his scheduled fuel stop. Grant won the only AMA National of his career at the 1970 Pacific Raceways National near Kent, Washington, riding a Suzuki T500 to victory over Yvon Duhamel (Yamaha) and Gary Nixon (Triumph), two of the fiercest competitors in AMA racing.

For Grant and the Suzuki team, the 1971 AMA road racing championship was filled with misfortune and mechanical failures. At the season-ending race held at the Ontario Motor Speedway, Grant placed third behind John Cooper (BSA) and Kel Carruthers (Yamaha).

As motorcycle engine technology transitioned from the 60 horsepower four-stroke motorcycles of the 1960s, to the 100 horsepower two-stroke motorcycles of the 1970s, tire manufacturers struggled to keep pace with the surge in power. At the 1972 Daytona 200, Suzuki introduced the TR750 which was clearly the fastest motorcycle in the field. Suzuki teammates Art Baumann, Jody Nicholas and Geof Perry qualified first, second and third, with Grant qualifying just off the first row, however the Suzuki team struggled with tires that only lasted for a few laps. Grant tried to ride conservatively to save his tire during the race, but was forced to retire with a clutch failure.

Grant's strong performances in AMA competition earned him a place on the North American team for the 1972 Transatlantic Trophy match races. The Transatlantic Trophy match races pitted the best British riders against the top North American road racers on 750cc motorcycles in a six-race series in England. His best result was a seventh place, but the American team's performance was affected by their inadequate time to prepare.

In November 1972, Grant traveled to Australia to win in the inaugural Pan Pacific Series, a four-round series featuring races at Oran Park, Calder Park, Adelaide International Raceway, and Wanneroo Raceway. At the first round at Oran Park, he finished second to local rider Bryan Hindle (Yamaha), then won the second round with a dramatic, last-corner pass of Ginger Molloy (Kawasaki). After the Adelaide round was cancelled, Grant placed third at final race at Wanneroo to clinch the series championship.

Grant briefly led the 1973 Daytona 200 but abandoned the race due to a broken chain, allowing Jarno Saarinen to claim the victory. At the 1973 Transatlantic Trophy, Grant took the lead at the first heat race at the Brands Hatch Circuit, but was struck by Paul Smart as they entered the first turn, causing him to crash. Grant was shaken up badly and missed the second heat race, and the crash affected his performance for the remaining four races of the series.

Grant was instrumental in helping further Pat Hennen's professional motorcycle racing career. Grant met Hennen while he was living in the San Francisco Bay Area, and hired him to help prepare racing motorcycles out of Grant's home garage. Grant subsequently became Hennen's racing mentor, helping him prepare a Suzuki X6 to compete in 250cc Junior Class road racing events in 1973. Grant then prepared a Suzuki T500 for Hennen as well as a Suzuki GT750 engine in a Rickman Brothers chassis. In 1974 Grant sponsored Hennen on a Yamaha TZ700, on which the latter scored the first major victory of his motorcycle racing career at the Daytona International Speedway when he set the fastest qualifying time and won the Junior Class event. Hennen went on to become the first American competitor to win a 500 cc World Championship Grand Prix race in 1977.

=== Later life and death ===
The 1973 oil crisis severely impacted all forms of motorsports in the United States and Suzuki made the decision to withdraw their team from the AMA national championship at the end of the 1975 season. After his AMA racing career had concluded, Grant moved to Whanganui, New Zealand to work for Rod Coleman and Suzuki New Zealand. Grant gave Hennen his first international racing experience by inviting him to New Zealand to compete in the New Zealand Marlboro Series. Hennen won the New Zealand Marlboro Series three years in succession from 1975 to 1977. Grant later invited a 16-year-old Randy Mamola to participate in the New Zealand Marlboro Series, providing him with valuable racing experience. Mamola would go on to be one of the most successful Grand Prix road racers of the 1980s.

Grant returned to Britain in 1986 where he lived in Louth, Lincolnshire while working for several motorcycle racing teams as a team manager and became known as a talented engine builder and tuner. He worked for the Honda Britain team in 1986 where he helped prepare motorcycles for Joey Dunlop, Nick Jefferies and nurtured the career of New Zealander Richard Scott, who went on to a ride with the Kenny Roberts Lucky Strike Yamaha 500cc GP team. In 1990 he worked for the Durex Suzuki team run by Mick Grant with Roger Burnett as their rider. He also briefly lived in Italy working for the RUMI Honda team with rider Fred Merkel.

Grant drowned in a boating accident on Strangford Lough in Northern Ireland in 1994. Grant boarded a speedboat with five other passengers for a trip to a pub on Sketrick Island. Upon their return trip in darkness, the boat encountered problems and sank. Grant was 54-years-old. His ashes were scattered at the Daytona International Speedway.
