= Clady Circuit =

Motorcycle racing circuit in Northern Ireland

- Short Circuit (1947–1952)
- Location: County Antrim, Northern Ireland
- Coordinates: 54°39′51″N 6°06′23″W
- Opened: 1922 (re-opened 1947)
- Closed: 1952 (firstly closed 1939)
- Major events: Grand Prix motorcycle racing Ulster Grand Prix (1949–1952)

Short Circuit (1947–1952)
- Length: 26.501 km (16.467 miles)
- Turns: 8+
- Race lap record: 9:21.000, 105.94 mph ( (United Kingdom) Les Graham, MV Agusta 4C, 1952, 500cc)

Original Circuit (1922–1939)
- Length: 32.992 km (20.500 miles)
- Turns: 8+
- Race lap record: 12:17.800, 100.03 mph ( (Italy) Dorino Serafini, Gilera, 1939, 500cc)

Clady Circuit situated in County Antrim, Northern Ireland describes a motor-cycle road racing street circuit used for the Ulster Grand Prix. The Clady Circuit was used between 1922 and 1939 and an amended shorter circuit between 1947 and 1952.

== History ==
The Clady Circuit, (Irish: Clóidigh; i.e. Washing river) first used in 1922 for the Ulster Grand Prix was 20.500 mi (32.992 km) in length in County Antrim. The original course start line was situated near Loanends Primary School on the secondary B39 Antrim to Belfast Road. The event held on public roads closed for racing including the secondary B39 Seven Mile Straight between Antrim and Clady Corner including Christy's Brae, the primary A52 Belfast to Crumlin Road between Clady Corner and Thorn Cottage, a tertiary road north from Thorn Cottage to Greenmount near the town of Antrim (including a section of RAF Aldergrove) and from Greenmount to Muckamore Corner with the road junction of the B39 'Seven Mile Straight.'

The Clady Circuit was shortened in 1947 to a length of 16.467 mi (26.501 km) with the omission of the Aldergrove section from Thorn Cottage to Greenmount. The short Clady Circuit now ran from Clady Corner to Nutts Corner on the primary A52 Belfast to Crumlin Road and used a section of the primary A 26 Banbridge to Coleraine Road from Nutts Corner to Muckamore House near Antrim. For the 1953 racing season the Clady Circuit was abandoned for motor-cycle racing and the Ulster Grand Prix as part of the FIM Motorcycle Grand Prix World Championship was moved to the nearby Dundrod Circuit in Co Antrim.

== Speed and Race Records ==
The lap record for the short Clady Circuit is 9 Minutes and 21 seconds at an average speed of 105.94 mph (170.49 km/h) set by Les Graham riding a 500cc MV Agusta 4C during the 1952 Ulster Grand Prix. The lap record for the 1922–1939 Clady Circuit is 12 minutes and 17.8 seconds at an average speed of 100.03 mph (160.98 km/h) by Dorino Serafini riding a 500cc Gilera motor-cycle during the 1939 Ulster Grand Prix. The race record for the short Clady Circuit is an average speed of 99.79 mph (160.60 km/h) set by Cromie McCandless riding a 500cc Gilera also during the 1952 Ulster Grand Prix.

== See also ==
- Ulster Grand Prix
- North West 200
- Isle of Man TT Races
