= Dundrod =

Village in County Antrim, Northern Ireland

Coordinates: 54°37′N 6°07′W

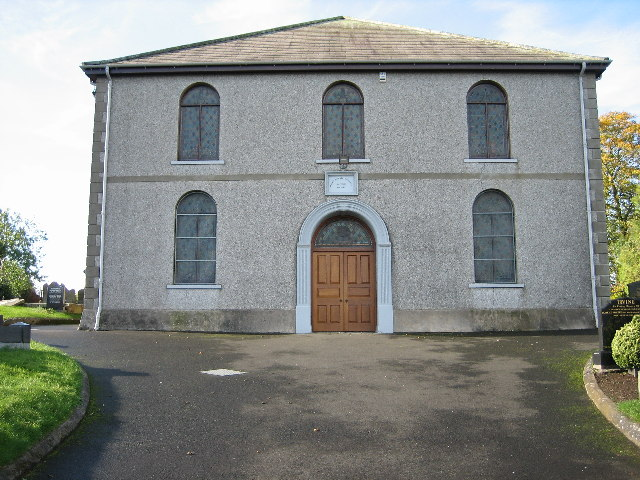
Presbyterian church

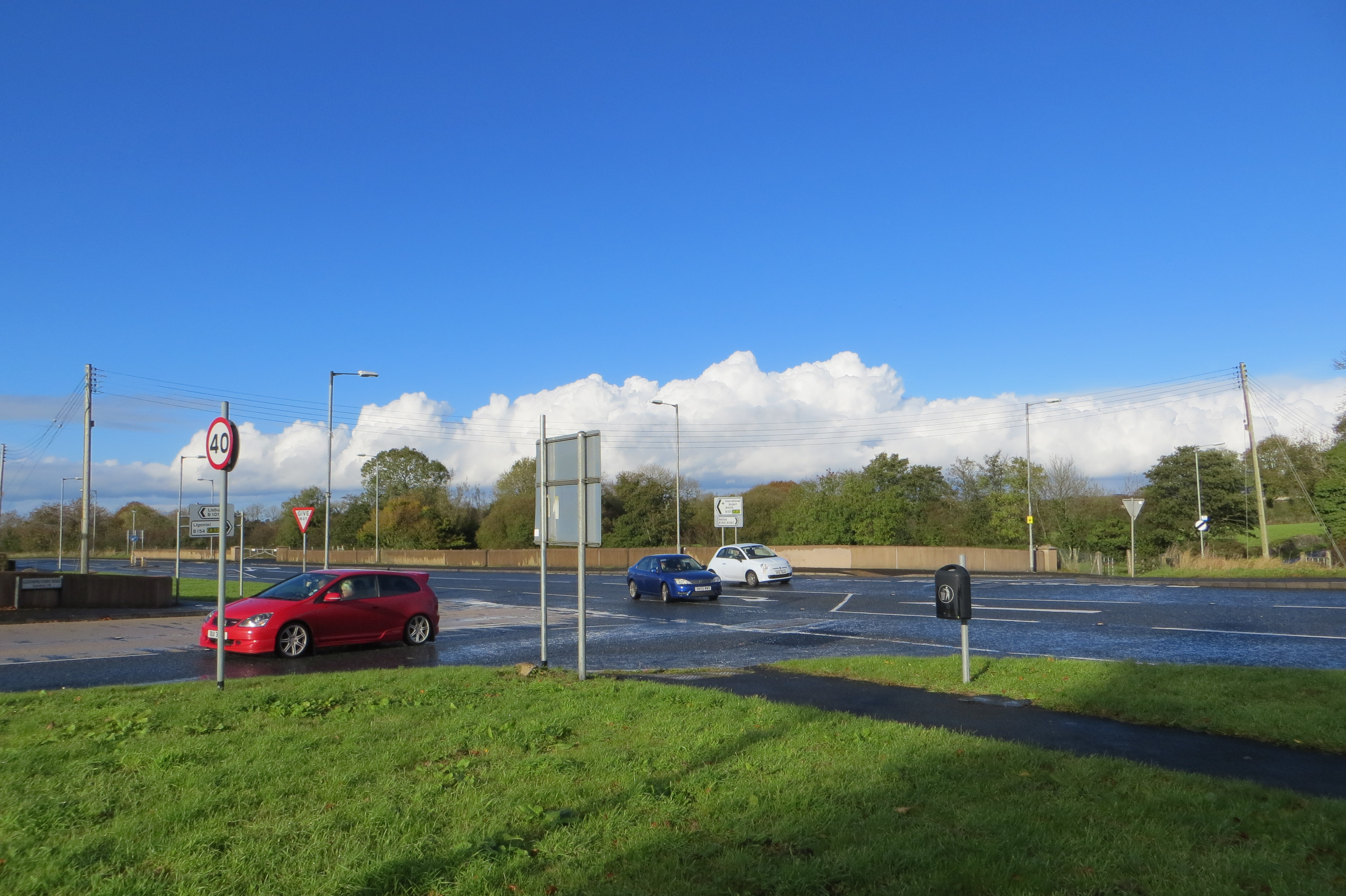
Crossroads in Dundrod

Dundrod (from Irish Dún dTrod) is a small village and townland in County Antrim, Northern Ireland. In the 2001 census, it had a population of 167 people. It is within the Lisburn City Council area.

Dundrod Circuit is the location of the Dundrod Motorcycle Road Racing Circuit. The circuit is seven miles and 505 yards long. The Ulster Grand Prix and the Dundrod 150 races are held here.
