= Kel Carruthers =

Australian motorcycle racer (born 1938)

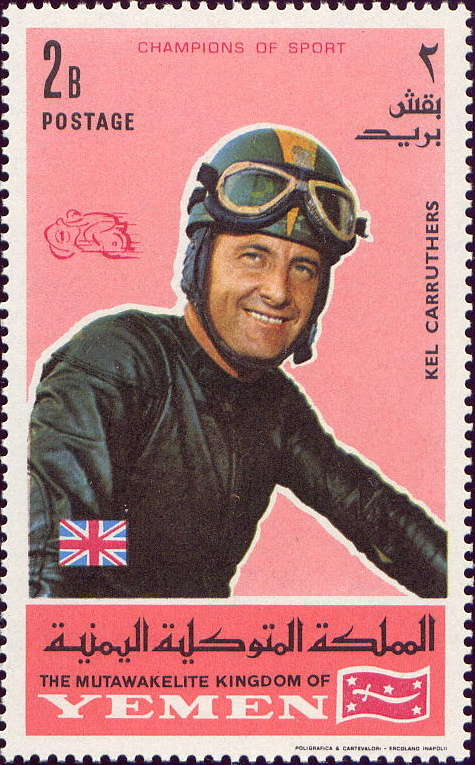
- Carruthers on a 1969 stamp of the Mutawakkilite Kingdom of Yemen, incorrectly displaying the Union Jack.
- Nationality: Australian
- Born: 3 January 1938 (age 88); Sydney, New South Wales, Australia
Motorcycle racing career statistics
Grand Prix motorcycle racing
Active years	1966 – 1970
First race	1966 350cc Ulster Grand Prix
Last race	1970 250cc Spanish Grand Prix
First win	1969 250cc Isle of Man TT
Last win	1970 250cc Ulster Grand Prix
Team(s)	Aermacchi, Benelli, Yamaha
Championships	250cc – 1969
Starts / Wins / Podiums / Poles / F. laps / Points; 56 / 7 / 22 / 0 / 8 / 302

Kelvin Carruthers (born 3 January 1938) is an Australian former professional Motorcycle racer and racing team manager. He competed in the FIM Grand Prix motorcycle racing world championships from 1966 to 1970, and in AMA road racing competitions from 1971 to 1973. Carruthers is prominent for winning the 1969 250cc World Championship. After his motorcycle riding career, he became race team manager for world championship winning riders Kenny Roberts and Eddie Lawson. In 2016 he was inducted into the Australian Motor Sport Hall of Fame.

== Motorcycle racing career ==
Carruthers, as the son of a motorcycle shop owner, learned how to work on bikes from a young age, started riding at 10, and entered his first race at 12. By the early 1960s he had won the Australian 125 cc, 250 cc, 350 cc and 500 cc National Championships.

In early 1966, Carruthers moved to Europe with his family to compete in British and International short-circuit races, including Grand Prix World Championship events riding a Drixton Aermacchi, and for early 1969 season riding bikes for the Aermacchi factory. Halfway through the 1969 season, he was offered a ride with the Benelli factory and won the Isle of Man 250 cc TT race. After the Isle of Man TT, Aermacchi released him from their contract to continue as a factory rider with Benelli and, he went on to win the 1969 FIM 250cc road racing world championship after a tight points battle with Santiago Herrero and Kent Andersson.

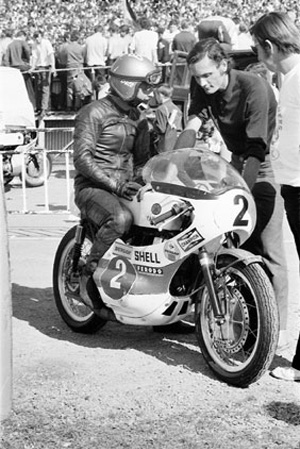
Kel Carruthers, Mallory Park 1970

After the 1970 Grand Prix season, he accepted an offer from Yamaha to race in America. By the 1973 season, Carruthers had taken on a wide array of responsibilities for the Yamaha team besides racing motorcycles. He had also become team manager, crew chief, as well as a rider coach for his younger Yamaha teammates, Kenny Roberts, Don Castro and Gary Fisher.

For the 1973 Daytona 200, Carruthers was responsible for preparing road racing machines for the entire Yamaha team, including the 250cc bikes to be run in the lightweight race. The Yamaha factory also asked him to prepare a motorcycle for the 1972 250cc World Champion, Jarno Saarinen. Despite having such a full workload, Carruthers was able to place second to Saarinen in the Daytona 200, marking his best result in the race, which at the time was considered one of the most prestigious motorcycle races in the world.

Carruthers stopped racing after the 1973 season to concentrate fully on his role as team manager and racing mentor for Roberts, who would win the 1973 and 1974 Grand National Championship for Yamaha. When it became apparent that Yamaha didn't have a motorcycle capable of competing with the dominant Harley Davidson dirt track team, they decided to send Carruthers and Roberts to Europe to compete in the road racing world championships. With Carruthers tuning the bikes and offering guidance, Roberts went on to win three consecutive world championships in 1978, 1979, and 1980. Carruthers also managed Eddie Lawson to a 500cc World Championship in 1984.

Carruthers went on to work for several Grand Prix teams through to 1995. In 1996, he took a job with the Sea-Doo watercraft factory racing team, helping them win several national and world titles. He returned to motorcycling in 1998 running a Yamaha satellite motocross team.

In 1985, Carruthers was inducted into the Sport Australia Hall of Fame. He was inducted into the AMA Motorcycle Hall of Fame in 1999.

== Grand Prix motorcycle racing results ==
Points system from 1950 to 1968:

**Position**	1	2	3	4	5	6
**Points**	8	6	4	3	2	1

Points system from 1969 onwards:

**Position**	1	2	3	4	5	6	7	8	9	10
**Points**	15	12	10	8	6	5	4	3	2	1

(key) (Races in bold indicate pole position; races in italics indicate fastest lap)

Year	Class	Team	1	2	3	4	5	6	7	8	9	10	11	12	13	Points	Rank	Wins
1966	125cc	Honda	ESP -	GER -		NED -		DDR -	CZE -	FIN; 8	ULS; 8	IOM; 12	NAT; 7	JPN -		0	–	0
1966	350cc	Norton		GER -	FRA -	NED -		DDR -	CZE -	FIN; 4	ULS -	IOM; NC	NAT -	JPN -		3	18th	0
1966	500cc	Norton		GER -		NED -	BEL -	DDR -	CZE -	FIN -	ULS -	IOM; 11	NAT -			0	–	0
1967	125cc	Honda	ESP -	GER -	FRA -	IOM; 5	NED -		DDR -	CZE -	FIN; 5	ULS; 4	NAT; 7	CAN -	JPN -	7	8th	0
1967	250cc	Suzuki	ESP -	GER -	FRA -	IOM; 12	NED -	BEL -	DDR -	CZE -	FIN -	ULS -	NAT -	CAN -	JPN -	0	–	0
1967	350cc	Aermacchi		GER; 5		IOM; 10	NED; 6		DDR; 4	CZE -		ULS; 4	NAT -		JPN -	9	7th	0
1967	500cc	Norton		GER -		IOM; NC	NED -		DDR -	CZE -		ULS -	NAT -		JPN -	0	–	0
1968	125cc	Honda	GER; 6	ESP -	IOM; 3	NED -		DDR -	CZE -	FIN -	ULS; 6	NAT -				6	10th	0
1968	250cc	Aermacchi	GER -	ESP -	IOM; NC	NED -	BEL -	DDR -	CZE -	FIN -	ULS -	NAT -				0	–	0
1968	350cc	Aermacchi	GER; 3		IOM; NC	NED -		DDR; 3	CZE; 4		ULS; 2	NAT -				17	**3rd**	0
1968	500cc	Norton	GER -	ESP -	IOM; 6	NED; 5	BEL; 5	DDR -	CZE -	FIN -	ULS; 6	NAT; 6				7	11th	0
1969	125cc	Aermacchi	ESP; 6	GER; 10	FRA -	IOM; 2	NED -	BEL -	DDR -	CZE; 9	FIN -		NAT -	YUG -		20	10th	0
1969	250cc	Benelli	ESP -	GER -	FRA -	IOM; 1	NED; 2	BEL; 3	DDR; 5	CZE; 3	FIN; 4	ULS; 1	NAT; 2	YUG; 1		89	**1st**	3
1969	350cc	Aermacchi	ESP; 2	GER; 6		IOM; NC	NED; 7		DDR; 7	CZE; 7	FIN -	ULS -	NAT -	YUG -		29	7th	0
1969	500cc	Aermacchi	ESP -	GER; 8	FRA -	IOM; NC	NED -	BEL -	DDR -	CZE -	FIN -	ULS -	NAT -	YUG -		3	44th	0
1970	250cc	Yamaha	GER; 1	**FRA**; NC	YUG -	IOM; 1	NED -	BEL; 2	DDR -	CZE; 1	FIN -	ULS; 1	NAT; 2	ESP -		84	**2nd**	4
1970	350cc	Yamaha	GER; 2		YUG; 2	IOM; NC	NED; 4		DDR; 3	CZE; 4	FIN; 4	ULS -	NAT -	ESP -		28	**2nd**	0

== Bibliography ==
- Flack, Darryl (30 August 2023). The Immortals of Australian Motorcycle Racing: The World Champs (Part of the 7-volume comprehensive sports collection). Immortals of Australian Sport (7-book series). Gelding Street Press. ISBN 978-0-6452070-5-7.
