= Bill Ivy =

British motorcycle racer

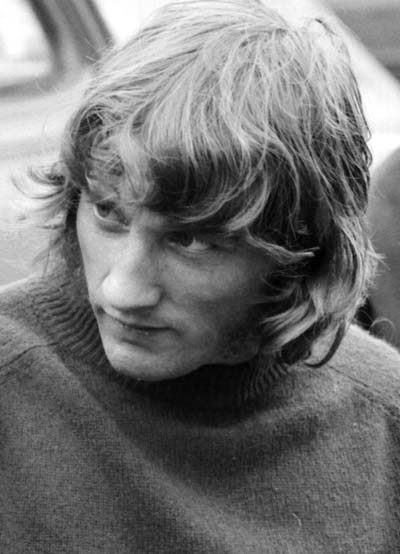
- Bill Ivy at the 1969 Eifelrennen held at the Nürburgring.
- Nationality: British
- Born: 27 August 1942; Maidstone, Kent, England
- Died: 12 July 1969 (aged 26); Hohenstein-Ernstthal, East Germany
Motorcycle racing career statistics
Grand Prix motorcycle racing
Active years	1962 – 1963, 1965 – 1969
First race	1962 Isle of Man 50cc Ultra-Lightweight TT
Last race	1969 350cc East German Grand Prix
First win	1966 125cc Spanish Grand Prix
Last win	1968 125cc Nations Grand Prix
Team(s)	Yamaha, Jawa
Championships	125cc – 1967
Starts / Wins / Podiums / Poles / F. laps / Points; 46 / 21 / 42 / N/A / 23

William David Ivy (27 August 1942 – 12 July 1969) was an English professional Grand Prix motorcycle racer from Maidstone, Kent. He died during practice for a race in East Germany.

== The early years ==
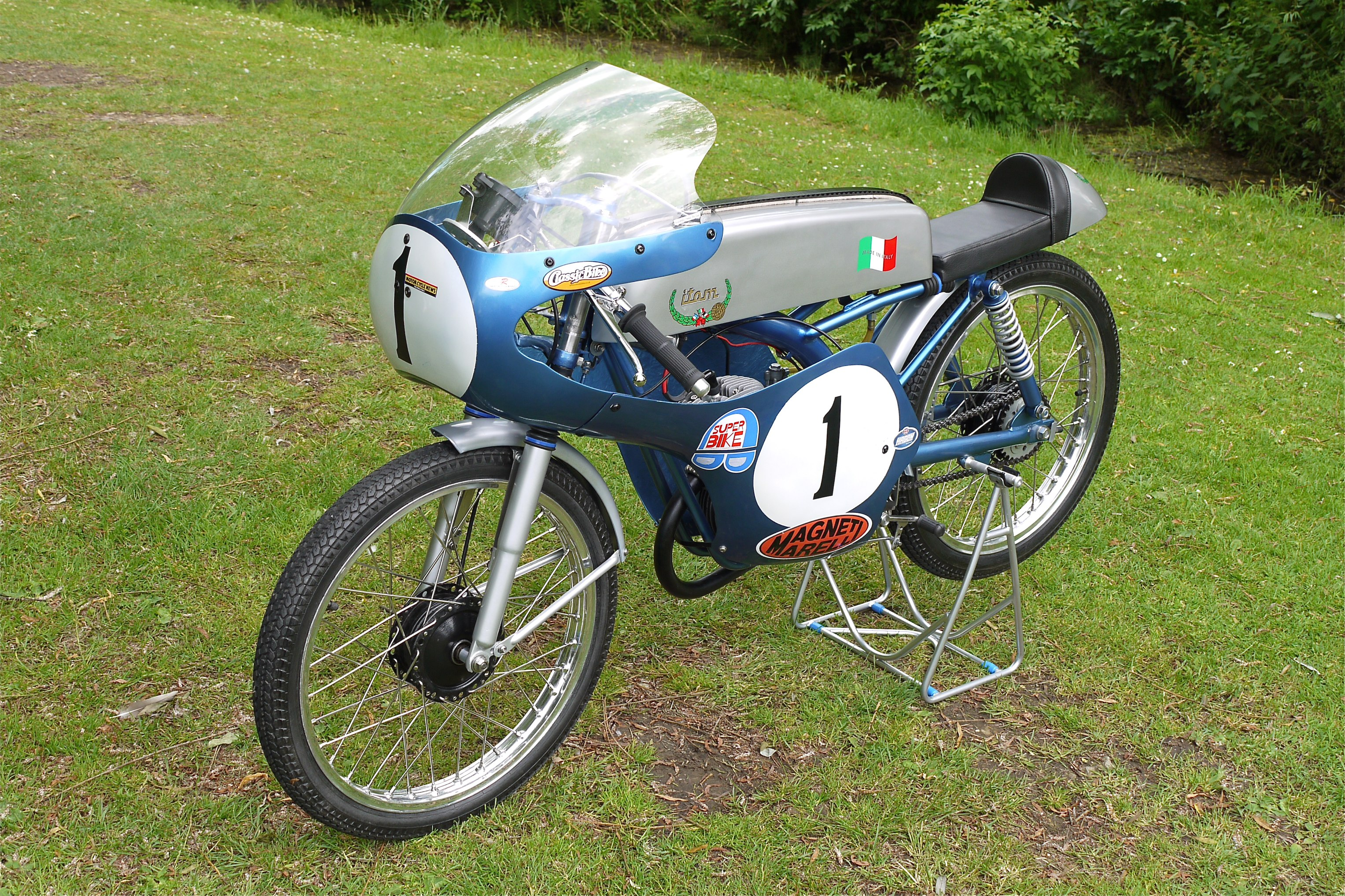
Itom 50cc racing motorcycle

Ivy started racing motorbikes at Brands Hatch, Kent, UK in 1959. His first race bike was a 50cc Itom. Entering his first TT race in 1962 on a Chisholm Itom, he later progressed to ride a variety of machinery on UK short circuits including Honda, Bultaco, Yamaha, Norton, Cotton, and Matchless machines. He joined the Tom Kirby racing team in May 1965.

== The Grand Prix Years ==
Ivy's big break into Grand Prix motorcycle racing came towards the end of 1965, when he was selected as a stand-in and flown to Japan in October by Yamaha due to regular rider Mike Duff crashing in practice for the Japanese GP, suffering a broken thigh. Ivy finished fourth in the 125 cc race and third in the 250 cc class, the highest-placed of the Yamahas. In 1966, he won his first race as a regular rider for the works Yamaha team in the first race of the year, the Spanish Grand Prix at the Montjuic Park Circuit, Barcelona in Spain, and took three more wins—not enough, however, to beat Swiss rider Luigi Taveri, who beat Ivy to the title by six points.

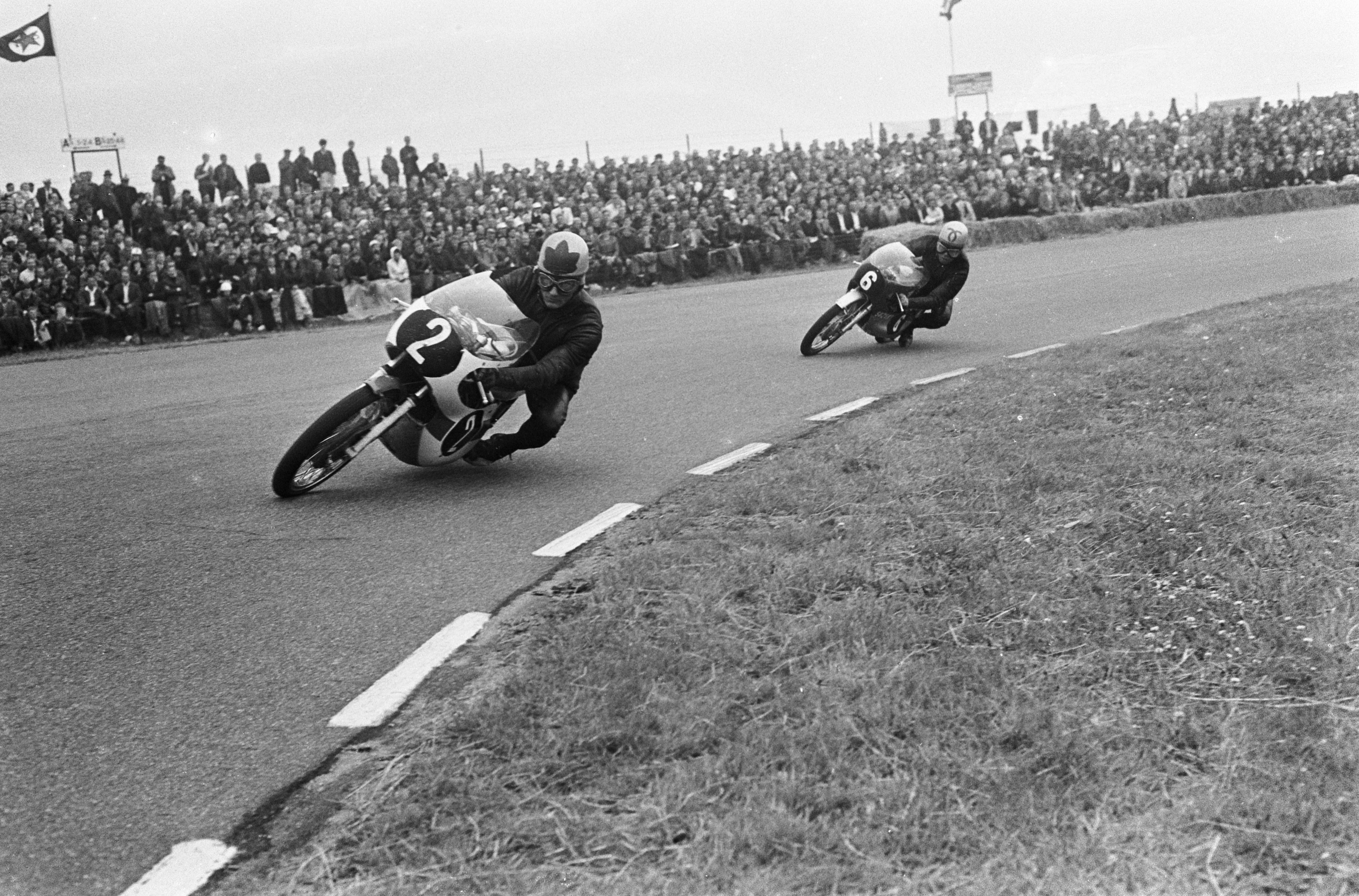
Bill Ivy (2) leads Yoshimi Katayama (6) during the 1967 125cc Dutch TT.

In 1967, Ivy dominated the 125 cc championship: he won eight out of twelve races to claim the World Championship by 16 points over Phil Read. On top of this, he won two 250 cc races in France and Belgium.

In 1968, Ivy and teammate Phil Read controlled both the 125 and 250 cc championships. In the process Ivy also became the first 125cc rider to lap the famous Isle Of Man TT Mountain Course at over 100 mph. As the season progressed, Yamaha ordered them to win one title each, with Ivy scheduled to win the 250 cc championship and Read the 125 cc championship. After securing the 125 cc title, Read ignored Yamaha's orders to tie with Ivy on points. The tie break was decided on overall race times, and Read took the title. Ivy announced his retirement from motorcycle racing, stating he would race Formula Two cars during the next season.

== Film stuntman ==
Ivy was the motorcycle riding stand-in in two films. He was in the 1965 James Bond film Thunderball as the stunt man, wearing a blond wig to make him look more like the character in the action sequence. He was also in the 1968 film The Girl on a Motorcycle for the medium to distant shots of Marianne Faithfull's character.

== Death ==
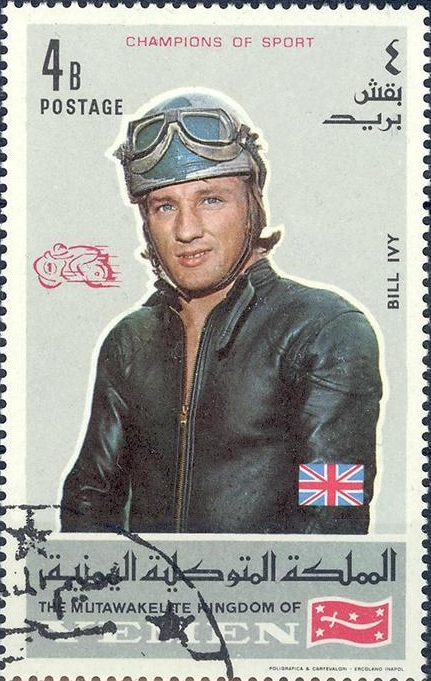
Bill Ivy on a 1969 Yemeni stamp

Despite showing some impressive results in Formula Two, in order to further fund his car racing, Ivy was enticed back to motorcycling by an offer from Jawa in 1969 to race their 350 cc motorcycle. The season started promisingly, as he took two second places behind Giacomo Agostini. However, during practice for the fifth race, on the Sachsenring in East Germany, his motorcycle's engine seized due to the breaking up of the lower left hand connecting rod bearing cage, at the very moment he was attempting to reajust with one hand his helmet that came loose. He was thrown from the bike, his helmet came off. He and the bike slid off the track where he impacted an unprotected fence post before bouncing back to the edge of the racing surface. His helmet was recovered from the opposite side of the track.

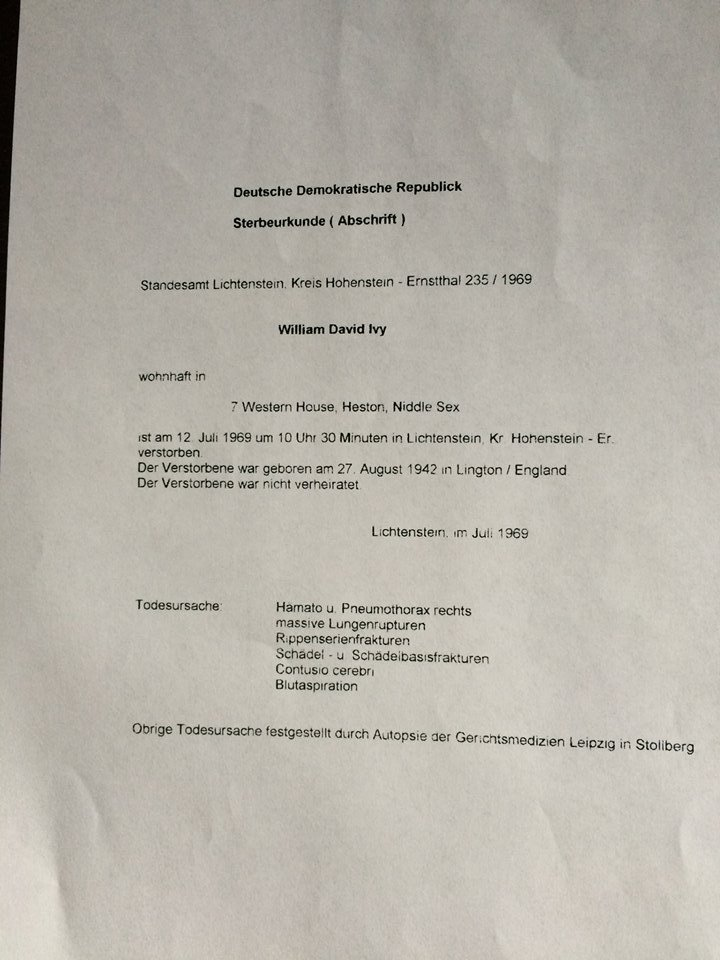

Ivy died from injuries received in the impact with the fence post. Injuries were listed as a fractured skull, brain hemorrhage, fractured ribs and a large puncture to at least one of his lungs.

Ivy was taken back to Ditton, near Maidstone, Kent where a service took place at St. Peter's Church, followed by a private service and cremation at Medway Crematorium, in Blue Bell Hill Village, Kent.

== Grand Prix motorcycle racing results ==
Points system from 1950 to 1968:

**Position**	1	2	3	4	5	6
**Points**	8	6	4	3	2	1

Points system from 1969 onwards:

**Position**	1	2	3	4	5	6	7	8	9	10
**Points**	15	12	10	8	6	5	4	3	2	1

(key) (Races in bold indicate pole position; races in italics indicate fastest lap)

Year	Class	Team	1	2	3	4	5	6	7	8	9	10	11	12	13	Points	Rank	Wins
1962	50cc	Chisholm Itom	ESP -	FRA -	IOM; 25	NED -	BEL -	GER -	ULS -	DDR -	NAT -	FIN -	ARG -			0	–	0
1963	50cc	Sheene	ESP -	GER -	FRA -	IOM; 7	NED -	BEL -			FIN -		ARG -	JPN -		0	–	0
1963	125cc	Bultaco	ESP -	GER -	FRA -	IOM; NC	NED -	BEL -	ULS -	DDR -	FIN -	NAT -	ARG -	JPN -		0	–	0
1965	125cc	Yamaha	USA -	GER -	ESP -	FRA -	IOM; 7	NED; 4		DDR -	CZE -	ULS -	FIN -	NAT -	JPN; 4	6	13th	0
1965	250cc	Yamaha	USA -	GER -	ESP -	FRA -	IOM; NC	NED -	BEL -	DDR -	CZE -	ULS -	FIN -	NAT -	JPN; 3	4	16th	0
1965	350cc	AJS		GER -			IOM; NC	NED -		DDR -	CZE -	ULS -	FIN -	NAT -	JPN -	0	–	0
1965	500cc	Matchless		GER -			IOM; NC	NED -	BEL -	DDR -	CZE -	ULS -	FIN -	NAT -	JPN -	0	–	0
1966	125cc	Yamaha	ESP; 1	GER; NC		NED; 1		DDR; 3	CZE; 3	FIN -	ULS -	IOM; 1	NAT; 3	JPN; 1		40	2nd	4
1966	250cc	Yamaha	ESP -	GER; 3	FRA -	NED -	BEL; 6	DDR -	CZE -	FIN -	ULS -	IOM; NC	NAT -	JPN -		5	12th	0
1966	350cc	Yamaha		GER -	FRA -	NED -		DDR -	CZE -	FIN -	ULS -	IOM -	NAT -	JPN; 2		6	11th	0
1967	125cc	Yamaha	ESP; 1	GER; NC	FRA; 1	IOM; NC	NED; 2	BEL -	DDR; 1	CZE; 1	FIN; 2	ULS; 1	NAT; 1	CAN; 1	JPN; 1	56	1st	8
1967	250cc	Yamaha	ESP -	GER -	FRA; 1	IOM; NC	NED; 2	BEL; 1	DDR; 2	CZE; 2	FIN; 2	ULS; 3	NAT; 2	CAN -	JPN; 6	46	3rd	2
1968	125cc	Yamaha	GER -	ESP -	IOM; 2	NED -		DDR; 2	CZE -	FIN; 2	ULS; 1	NAT; 1				34	2nd	2
1968	250cc	Yamaha	GER; 1	ESP -	IOM; 1	NED; 1	BEL -	DDR; 1	CZE; 2	FIN -	ULS; 1	NAT; 2				46	2nd	5
1969	350cc	Jawa	ESP -	GER; 2	IOM -	NED; 2	DDR -	CZE -	FIN -	ULS -	NAT -	YUG -				24	10th	0
