= Loanends =

Place in Northern Ireland

Coordinates: 54°39′54″N 6°06′27″W

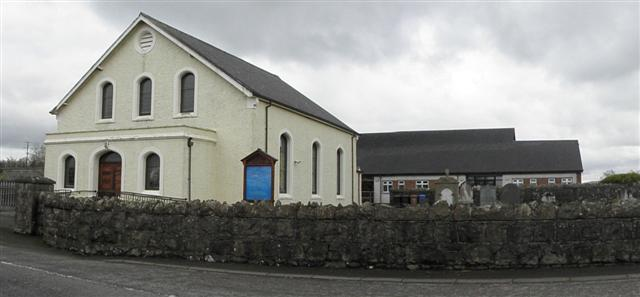
The church and church hall in Loanends

Loanends is a hamlet located in the townlands of Grange of Carmavy and Ballymather Lower, near Antrim in County Antrim, Northern Ireland. The settlement's name derives from the term 'loan-end', which translates to 'lane-end', and there are three minor roads that are quite close to each other that form Loanends. The hamlet has a Presbyterian Church, a church hall, a primary school and an Orange hall.
