= Ulster Grand Prix =

Motorcycle race held in Northern Ireland

- Dundrod Circuit, the racecourse
- Status: Defunct
- Genre: Public road motorcycle race
- Venue: Dundrod Circuit
- Location: Lisburn, Northern Ireland
- Years active: 1922–2019
- Inaugurated: 1922
- Most recent: 2019
- Participants: Werner Haas (first winner); Joey Dunlop (most wins: 24)
- Organiser: Dundrod & District Motorcycle Club
- Sponsor: Aer Lingus (most recent)

The Ulster Grand Prix is a (currently) defunct motorcycle road race which took place on the 7.401 mi (11.911 km) Dundrod Circuit made up entirely of closed-off public roads near Belfast, Northern Ireland. Due to the races having the fastest average speed over a single lap of any motorcycle road race, it was the fastest race of its kind (Road Racing) in the world. The lap record of 136.415 mph (219.539 km/h) was set by Peter Hickman in the 2019 superbike race, a faster average than the Isle of Man TT lap record, which stands at 136.358 mph (219.446 km/h) as of 2024, set also by Peter Hickman.

The last running of the event occurred in 2019. As a consequence of increased insurance and sundry costs, in association with diminished sponsorship revenue, together with the COVID-19 pandemic, the future of the meeting has been called into question.

However at the Irish Motorbike Awards held on November 3, 2025, an announcement was made that the Ulster Grand Prix would be resurrected, with the provisional date set for the meeting to return as part of the 2027 International Road Racing calendar.

== History ==
=== Origins ===
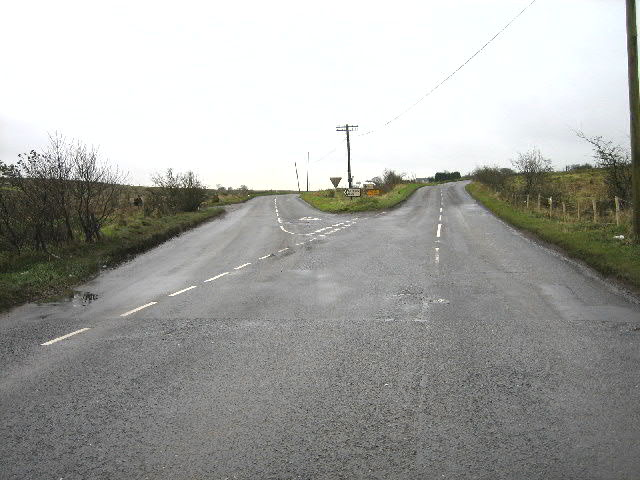
Hairpin bend on the Dundrod Circuit

The first races took place in 1922 and in 1935 and 1948 the Fédération Internationale de Motocyclisme gave it the title Grand Prix d'Europe. The Ulster Grand Prix was included as one of the races in the inaugural 1949 Grand Prix motorcycle racing season (now MotoGP), a place it held until 1971. It also counted for the Formula TT Championship between 1979 and 1990. The race has been held on three different circuits. The 20.5 mi (33.0 km) Old Clady circuit was used from 1922 until 1939 and included a notoriously bumpy 7 mi (11 km) straight.

=== 1947 – 1952 ===
After World War II the new Clady circuit was used that, due to road improvements, was now 16.467 mi (26.501 km) in length and in use between 1947 and 1952.

=== 1953 – 2019 ===
From 1953 the venue was moved to the 7.401 mi (11.911 km) Dundrod Circuit, less than a mile south from the old Clady circuit.

The 1971 meeting marked the last year in which the Ulster Grand Prix formed part of the FIM Grand Prix International Motorcycle Racing Calendar. The 250cc race was won by Ray McCulloch whilst the meeting concluded with Australian Jack Findlay taking the honours in the 500cc blue ribband finale race on board a Suzuki. This was Findlay's first victory for Suzuki and was also notable in that it recorded the first 500cc class win for a motorcycle powered by a two stroke engine. The event was cancelled in 1972 because of the political situation in Northern Ireland, but it was held in 2001 during the Foot-and-mouth crisis, even though the North West 200 and Isle of Man TT were cancelled that year.

=== 2019 meeting ===
The final meeting took place in 2019 which saw the running of a full race programme with Man of the Meeting, Peter Hickman, establishing a record of seven victories over two days during which he upped the outright lap record to 136.415 mph (219.539 km/h).

== Future in doubt ==
As of 2026 the future of the meeting remains under threat. In the wake of the 2019 races the following meetings were consequently cancelled as a repercussion of a lack of financial backing in addition to the COVID-19 pandemic. Following the 2019 event several top riders, including Peter Hickman, subsequently had prize money held back by the organisers. As a result, Hickman has stated that he would be disinclined to return to any reincarnation of the event until he has received all outstanding monies in full.

In 2020 a winding up order was issued to the Ulster Grand Prix organisers, the Dundrod & District Motorcycle Club, with the Dundrod & District having amassed debts of approximately £300,000. Following the issuing of the order, the club went into liquidation before later entering into a company voluntary arrangement (CVA) to pay back a portion of its debts to creditors.

There was a degree of optimism for the running of the races which would have marked the centenary of the event in 2022. In March of that year, a potential new promotor, the Revival Racing Motorcycle Club, signaled that they were prepared to undertake the stewardship of the meeting with a view to a return of racing in August 2022. In an ambitious bid to bring Ireland's two biggest road races under one organisational umbrella, Revival Racing had sought to put together a major proposal for a financial package of £800,000 which would see them take over the Ulster Grand Prix in addition to seeking to safeguard the future of the North West 200.

Government funding was signed off by the Department of Economy and Department of Finance, but in a late setback Tourism NI refused to support the proposal which in turn resulted in the proposal being withdrawn and the 2022 race meeting was cancelled.

During the Autumn of 2022 a further feasibility study was undertaken by Revival Racing with a view to the running of the Ulster Grand Prix in August 2023. Whilst initial studies appeared favourable, Revival Racing subsequently found difficulty in mustering the required financing and in October 2022 issued the following statement:

"As this situation is unlikely to change in time to allow us to progress for 2023, we have therefore reluctantly withdrawn our UGP date application with the MCUI (UC)."

— Revival Racing Motorcycle Club statement: Thursday 27 October 2022.

This resulted in Revival Racing relinquishing further involvement with the event, and consequently the Dundrod & District Motorcycle Club undertook to attempt to organise the 2023 meeting. The proposed format would have entailed a much reduced programme of racing, more in line with that of a National as opposed to an International meeting.

On 9 February 2023, the Motorcycle Union of Ireland announced that the racing schedule was under threat of being cancelled because of a significant increase in the insurance premium required to cover the events. In late April 2023 the organisers cancelled the 2023 event, citing insurance and funding problems.

A further announcement, issued by the event's organisers, the Dundrod & District Motorcycle Club, was made on 8 January 2024, concerning the running of the event as part of the 2024 racing calendar. The statement by the club concluded by stating that due to ongoing insurance and financing issues, the proposed 2024 Ulster Grand Prix had been cancelled.

== Official names and sponsors ==
- 1958, 1961, 1964–1965, 1971: Ulster Grand Prix (no official sponsor)

== Incidents ==
In 1997 Dublin sidecar pilot Stephen Galligan died of injuries sustained in a warm-up crash the day before the race. Mr Galligan died ten days later in hospital. Seven-year-old spectator Christopher McConnell-Hewitt also lost his life when he was struck by the sidecar which veered out of control on a long straight and crashed into a crowd.

== Notable riders ==
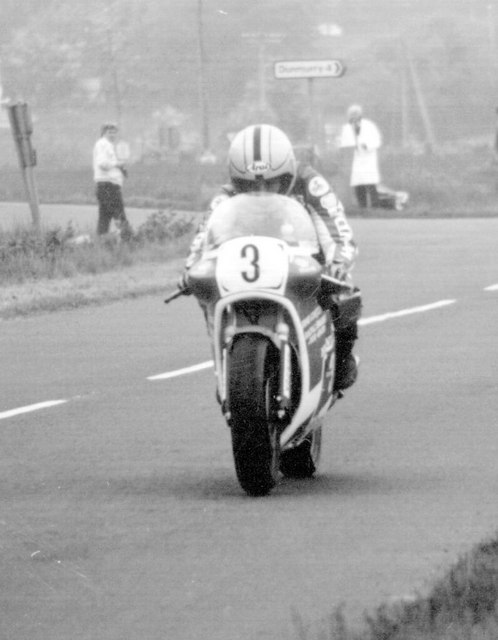
Joey Dunlop during the 1982 Ulster Grand Prix

Joey Dunlop won 24 Ulster Grand Prix races during his career, with Phillip McCallen winning 14 races, Peter Hickman with 13 wins, Bruce Anstey 12 and Brian Reid 9 wins. Some of the famous riders include: Guy Martin (11 wins) Stanley Woods (7 wins), Jimmie Guthrie, Jimmie Simpson, Artie Bell, Les Graham, Freddie Frith (3 wins), Geoff Duke (3 wins), John Surtees (6 wins), Ray Amm, Carlo Ubbiali (5 wins), Bill Lomas (3 wins), Mike Hailwood (7 wins), Giacomo Agostini (7 wins), Phil Read (3 wins), Bill Ivy (3 wins), Bob McIntyre, Gary Hocking (3 wins), Tom Herron (5 wins), Ron Haslam (5 wins), Jon Ekerold, and more recently Mick Grant, Wayne Gardner, Steve Hislop, Robert Dunlop (9 wins).

== FIM World Championship rounds (1949–1971) ==
Ulster Grand Prix

Grand Prix motorcycle racing
- Venue: Dundrod Circuit (1953–1971); Clady Circuit (1949–1952)
- First race: 1949
- Last race: 1971
- Most wins (rider): Giacomo Agostini, Mike Hailwood (7)
- Most wins (manufacturer): MV Agusta (24)

=== Multiple winners (riders) ===
# Wins	Rider	Wins	
# Wins	Rider	Category	Years won
7	(United Kingdom) Mike Hailwood	500cc	1962, 1963, 1966, 1967
7	(United Kingdom) Mike Hailwood	350cc	1966
7	(United Kingdom) Mike Hailwood	250cc	1967
7	(United Kingdom) Mike Hailwood	125cc	1959
7	(Italy) Giacomo Agostini	500cc	1968, 1969, 1970
7	(Italy) Giacomo Agostini	350cc	1967, 1968, 1969, 1970
6	(United Kingdom) John Surtees	500cc	1958, 1959
6	(United Kingdom) John Surtees	350cc	1958, 1959, 1960
6	(United Kingdom) John Surtees	250cc	1955
5	(Italy) Carlo Ubbiali	250cc	1960
5	(Italy) Carlo Ubbiali	125cc	1950, 1956, 1958, 1960
4	(Federation of Rhodesia and Nyasaland) Jim Redman	350cc	1962, 1963, 1964
4	(Federation of Rhodesia and Nyasaland) Jim Redman	250cc	1963
4	(Switzerland) Luigi Taveri	250cc	1956
4	(Switzerland) Luigi Taveri	125cc	1957, 1962, 1966
3	(United Kingdom) Geoff Duke	500cc	1950, 1951
3	(United Kingdom) Geoff Duke	350cc	1951
3	(United Kingdom) Maurice Cann	250cc	1949, 1950, 1952
3	(United Kingdom) Bill Lomas	500cc	1955
3	(United Kingdom) Bill Lomas	350cc	1955, 1956
3	(Federation of Rhodesia and Nyasaland) Gary Hocking	500cc	1961
3	(Federation of Rhodesia and Nyasaland) Gary Hocking	350cc	1961
3	(Federation of Rhodesia and Nyasaland) Gary Hocking	250cc	1959
3	(United Kingdom) Phil Read	500cc	1964
3	(United Kingdom) Phil Read	250cc	1964, 1965
3	(United Kingdom) Bill Ivy	250cc	1968
3	(United Kingdom) Bill Ivy	125cc	1967, 1968
2	(Australia) Ken Kavanagh	500cc	1953
2	(Australia) Ken Kavanagh	350cc	1952
2	(West Germany) Werner Haas	250cc	1954
2	(West Germany) Werner Haas	125cc	1953
2	(United Kingdom) Cecil Sandford	250cc	1957
2	(United Kingdom) Cecil Sandford	125cc	1952
2	(United Kingdom) John Hartle	500cc	1956, 1960
2	(New Zealand) Hugh Anderson	125cc	1963, 1964
2	(Australia) Kel Carruthers	250cc	1969, 1970
2	(Spain) Ángel Nieto	50cc	1969, 1970

=== Multiple winners (manufacturers) ===
# Wins	Manufacturer	Wins	
# Wins	Manufacturer	Category	Years won
24	(Italy) MV Agusta	500cc	1958, 1959, 1961, 1962, 1963, 1968, 1969, 1970
24	(Italy) MV Agusta	350cc	1958, 1959, 1960, 1961, 1967, 1968, 1969, 1970
24	(Italy) MV Agusta	250cc	1956, 1958, 1960
24	(Italy) MV Agusta	125cc	1952, 1956, 1957, 1958, 1960
13	(Japan) Honda	500cc	1966, 1967
13	(Japan) Honda	350cc	1962, 1963, 1964, 1966
13	(Japan) Honda	250cc	1961, 1962, 1963, 1967
13	(Japan) Honda	125cc	1961, 1962, 1966
11	(United Kingdom) Norton	500cc	1950, 1951, 1953, 1956, 1960, 1964, 1965
11	(United Kingdom) Norton	350cc	1951, 1952, 1953, 1954
8	(Italy) Moto Guzzi	500cc	1955
8	(Italy) Moto Guzzi	350cc	1955, 1956, 1957
8	(Italy) Moto Guzzi	250cc	1949, 1950, 1951, 1952
7	(Japan) Yamaha	250cc	1964, 1965, 1968, 1970, 1971
7	(Japan) Yamaha	125cc	1967, 1968
5	(West Germany) NSU	250cc	1953, 1954, 1955
5	(West Germany) NSU	125cc	1953, 1954
4	(Japan) Suzuki	500cc	1971
4	(Japan) Suzuki	125cc	1963, 1964, 1965
2	(United Kingdom) Velocette	350cc	1949, 1950
2	(Italy) Mondial	250cc	1957
2	(Italy) Mondial	125cc	1950
2	(Italy) Gilera	500cc	1952, 1957
2	(Spain) Derbi	50cc	1969, 1970
2	(West Germany) MZ	350cc	1971
2	(West Germany) MZ	250cc	1959

=== By year ===
A pink background indicates a round that was not part of the Grand Prix motorcycle racing championship.

Year	Track	50cc		125cc		250cc		350cc		500cc		Report
Year	Track	Rider	Manufacturer	Rider	Manufacturer	Rider	Manufacturer	Rider	Manufacturer	Rider	Manufacturer	Report
1971	Dundrod	Race cancelled (Note: The 1971 50cc race was cancelled as the organisers had only received eight entries.)				(United Kingdom) Ray McCullough	Yamaha	(United Kingdom) Peter Williams	MZ	(Australia) Jack Findlay	Suzuki	Report
1970	Dundrod	(Spain) Ángel Nieto	Derbi			(Australia) Kel Carruthers	Yamaha	(Italy) Giacomo Agostini	MV Agusta	(Italy) Giacomo Agostini	MV Agusta	Report
1969	Dundrod	(Spain) Ángel Nieto	Derbi			(Australia) Kel Carruthers	Benelli	(Italy) Giacomo Agostini	MV Agusta	(Italy) Giacomo Agostini	MV Agusta	Report
1968	Dundrod			(United Kingdom) Bill Ivy	Yamaha	(United Kingdom) Bill Ivy	Yamaha	(Italy) Giacomo Agostini	MV Agusta	(Italy) Giacomo Agostini	MV Agusta	Report
1967	Dundrod			(United Kingdom) Bill Ivy	Yamaha	(United Kingdom) Mike Hailwood	Honda	(Italy) Giacomo Agostini	MV Agusta	(United Kingdom) Mike Hailwood	Honda	Report
1966	Dundrod			(Switzerland) Luigi Taveri	Honda	(New Zealand) Ginger Molloy	Bultaco	(United Kingdom) Mike Hailwood	Honda	(United Kingdom) Mike Hailwood	Honda	Report
1965	Dundrod			(West Germany) Ernst Degner	Suzuki	(United Kingdom) Phil Read	Yamaha	(Czechoslovakia) František Šťastný	Jawa	(United Kingdom) Dick Creith	Norton	Report
1964	Dundrod			(New Zealand) Hugh Anderson	Suzuki	(United Kingdom) Phil Read	Yamaha	(Rhodesia) Jim Redman	Honda	(United Kingdom) Phil Read	Norton	Report
1963	Dundrod			(New Zealand) Hugh Anderson	Suzuki	(Federation of Rhodesia and Nyasaland) Jim Redman	Honda	(Federation of Rhodesia and Nyasaland) Jim Redman	Honda	(United Kingdom) Mike Hailwood	MV Agusta	Report
1962	Dundrod			(Switzerland) Luigi Taveri	Honda	(United Kingdom) Tommy Robb	Honda	(Federation of Rhodesia and Nyasaland) Jim Redman	Honda	(United Kingdom) Mike Hailwood	MV Agusta	Report
Year	Track			125cc		250cc		350cc		500cc		Report
Year	Track			Rider	Manufacturer	Rider	Manufacturer	Rider	Manufacturer	Rider	Manufacturer	Report
1961	Dundrod			(Japan) Kunimitsu Takahashi	Honda	(United Kingdom) Bob McIntyre	Honda	(Federation of Rhodesia and Nyasaland) Gary Hocking	MV Agusta	(Federation of Rhodesia and Nyasaland) Gary Hocking	MV Agusta	Report
1960	Dundrod			(Italy) Carlo Ubbiali	MV Agusta	(Italy) Carlo Ubbiali	MV Agusta	(United Kingdom) John Surtees	MV Agusta	(United Kingdom) John Hartle	Norton	Report
1959	Dundrod			(United Kingdom) Mike Hailwood	Ducati	(Federation of Rhodesia and Nyasaland) Gary Hocking	MZ	(United Kingdom) John Surtees	MV Agusta	(United Kingdom) John Surtees	MV Agusta	Report
1958	Dundrod			(Italy) Carlo Ubbiali	MV Agusta	(Italy) Tarquinio Provini	MV Agusta	(United Kingdom) John Surtees	MV Agusta	(United Kingdom) John Surtees	MV Agusta	Report
1957	Dundrod			(Switzerland) Luigi Taveri	MV Agusta	(United Kingdom) Cecil Sandford	FB-Mondial	(Australia) Keith Campbell	Moto Guzzi	(Italy) Libero Liberati	Gilera	Report
1956	Dundrod			(Italy) Carlo Ubbiali	MV Agusta	(Switzerland) Luigi Taveri	MV Agusta	(United Kingdom) Bill Lomas	Moto Guzzi	(United Kingdom) John Hartle	Norton	Report
1955	Dundrod					(United Kingdom) John Surtees	NSU	(United Kingdom) Bill Lomas	Moto Guzzi	(United Kingdom) Bill Lomas	Moto Guzzi	Report
1954	Dundrod			(Austria) Rupert Hollaus	NSU	(West Germany) Werner Haas	NSU	(Federation of Rhodesia and Nyasaland) Ray Amm	Norton	(Federation of Rhodesia and Nyasaland) Ray Amm (Note: The 1954 500cc race was stopped due to bad weather and the race was excluded from the world championship.)	Norton	Report
1953	Dundrod			(West Germany) Werner Haas	NSU	(Republic of Ireland) Reg Armstrong	NSU	(New Zealand) Ken Mudford	Norton	(Australia) Ken Kavanagh	Norton	Report
1952	Clady			(United Kingdom) Cecil Sandford	MV Agusta	(United Kingdom) Maurice Cann	Moto Guzzi	(Australia) Ken Kavanagh	Norton	(United Kingdom) Cromie McCandless	Gilera	Report
1951	Clady			(United Kingdom) Cromie McCandless (Note: The 1951 125cc race only had four competitors and the race was excluded from the world championship.)	FB-Mondial	(Italy) Bruno Ruffo	Moto Guzzi	(United Kingdom) Geoff Duke	Norton	(United Kingdom) Geoff Duke	Norton	Report
1950	Clady			(Italy) Carlo Ubbiali	FB-Mondial	(United Kingdom) Maurice Cann	Moto Guzzi	(United Kingdom) Bob Foster	Velocette	(United Kingdom) Geoff Duke	Norton	Report
1949	Clady					(United Kingdom) Maurice Cann	Moto Guzzi	(United Kingdom) Freddie Frith	Velocette	(United Kingdom) Les Graham	AJS	Report

Footnotes

== See also ==
- Clady Circuit
- Dundrod Circuit
- North West 200
- Grand Prix motorcycle racing
- List of Grand Prix motorcycle racing seasons
- List of Grand Prix motorcycle racing World Champions
