= 1967 Canadian motorcycle Grand Prix =

(Canada) 1967 Canadian Grand Prix
Race details
- Race 12 of 13 races in the 1967 Grand Prix motorcycle racing season
- Date: 30 September 1967
- Location: Mosport Park
- Course: Permanent racing facility; 4.102 km (2.549 mi)

500cc
Pole position
Rider	(United Kingdom) Mike Hailwood	Honda
Fastest lap
Rider	(United Kingdom) Mike Hailwood	Honda
Time	1:42.700	
Podium
First	(United Kingdom) Mike Hailwood	Honda
Second	(Italy) Giacomo Agostini	MV Agusta
Third	(Canada) Mike Duff	Matchless

250cc
Pole position
Rider	(United Kingdom) Mike Hailwood	Honda
Fastest lap
Rider	(United Kingdom) Mike Hailwood	Honda
Time	1:36.800	
Podium
First	(United Kingdom) Mike Hailwood	Honda
Second	(United Kingdom) Phil Read	Yamaha
Third	(United Kingdom) Ralph Bryans	Honda

125cc
Pole position
Rider	(United Kingdom) Bill Ivy	Yamaha
Fastest lap
Rider	(United Kingdom) Bill Ivy	Yamaha
Time	1:45.900	
Podium
First	(United Kingdom) Bill Ivy	Yamaha
Second	(Canada) Tim Coopey	Yamaha
Third	(Canada) Robert Lusk	Yamaha

The 1967 Canadian motorcycle Grand Prix was the twelfth round of the 1967 Grand Prix motorcycle racing season. It took place on the weekend of 30 September 1967 at the Mosport Park circuit in Bowmanville, Canada. This was multiple champion Mike Hailwood's last FIM championship event.

== History ==
The Canadian Grand Prix was added to the calendar in 1967 as the penultimate round of the 50cc, 125cc, 250cc and 350cc categories and as the final round of the 500cc category. This happened at the same time as Canada celebrating its 100th birthday of independence, the reason being why the race was organised by the Federal Centennial Commission. Despite it being the season finale, the Canadian Grand Prix was unpopular. The FIM had sanctioned the event because the organisers had delayed the race by one week. As a result, the FIM punished them by prohibiting the organisers to host a Canadian GP the following year. While there were a decent amount of 5000 spectators compared to the United States Grand Prix held two years earlier, the private riders who normally participated decided not to participate in this race due to the disproportionate starting fees being offered compared to the travel costs. Because of this, only a handful of factory riders participated along with a big number of Canadians and Americans, with the latter outnumbering the former in the 125 and 250cc classes. To date, the 1967 event is the first and only Canadian Grand Prix ever held.

In 2017, on the dates of 10 to 12 August, a reunion was held to celebrate the 50-year anniversary of the 1967 race. The event was organised by Canada's Vintage Road Racing Association as part of the annual Mosport Vintage Festival. Alongside the normal race program, a series of parades were held featuring some of the actual motorcycles and riders who participated in the 1967 Canadian Grand Prix.

== 500 cc classification ==
Pos	Rider	Manufacturer	Points
1	(United Kingdom) Mike Hailwood	Honda	8
2	(Italy) Giacomo Agostini	MV Agusta	6
3	(Canada) Mike Duff	Matchless	4
4	(United Kingdom) Ivor Lloyd	Matchless	3
5	(South Africa) Andreas Georgeades	Velocette	2
6	(United States) George Rockett	Norton	1

== 250 cc classification ==
Pos	Rider	Manufacturer	Points
1	(United Kingdom) Mike Hailwood	Honda	8
2	(United Kingdom) Phil Read	Yamaha	6
3	(United Kingdom) Ralph Bryans	Honda	4
4	(Canada) Yvon Duhamel	Yamaha	3
5	(United States) Frank Camillieri	Yamaha	2
6	(United Kingdom) Ron Grant	Yamaha	1

== 125 cc classification ==
Pos	Rider	Manufacturer	Points
1	(United Kingdom) Bill Ivy	Yamaha	8
2	(Canada) Tim Coopey	Yamaha	6
3	(United States) Robert Lusk	Yamaha	4
4	(Canada) Jean-Guy Duval	Yamaha	3
5	(United States) Ralph Swegan	Yamaha	2
6	(United States) Robert Messina	Yamaha	1

Previous race: 1967 Nations Grand Prix	FIM Grand Prix World Championship; 1967 season	Next race: 1967 Japanese Grand Prix
Previous race: None	Canadian motorcycle Grand Prix	Next race: None
