= Phil Read =

English motorcycle racer (1939–2022)

Phil Read MBE
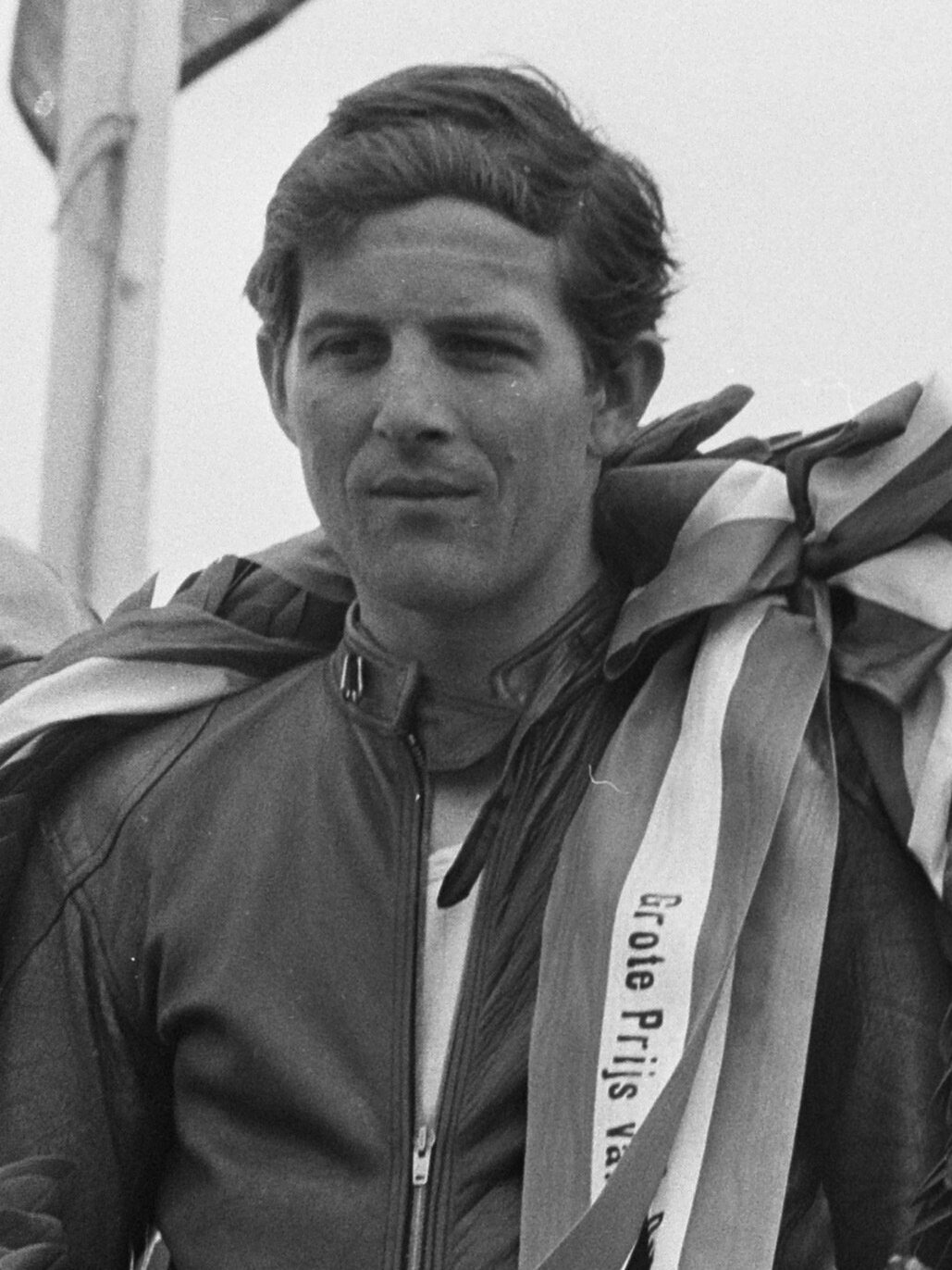
- Read in 1968
- Nationality: British
- Born: 1 January 1939; Luton, Bedfordshire, England
- Died: 6 October 2022 (aged 83); Canterbury, England
Motorcycle racing career statistics
Grand Prix motorcycle racing
Active years	1961–1976
First race	1961 350cc Isle of Man TT
Last race	1976 500cc Nations Grand Prix
First win	1961 350cc Isle of Man TT
Last win	1975 500cc Czechoslovak Grand Prix
Team(s)	Yamaha, MV Agusta, Suzuki
Championships	125cc – 1968 250cc – 1964, 1965, 1968, 1971 500cc – 1973, 1974 Formula TT – 1977
Starts / Wins / Podiums / Poles / F. laps / Points; 152 / 52 / 121 / 4 / 36 / 1039
Isle of Man TT career
TTs contested	14 (1961 – 1973, 1977)
TT wins	8
First TT win	1961 Junior TT
Last TT win	1977 Senior TT
TT podiums	13

Phillip William Read (1 January 1939 – 6 October 2022) was an English professional motorcycle racer. He competed in the FIM Grand Prix motorcycle racing World Championships from 1961 to 1976. Read is notable for being the first competitor to win world championships in the 125 cc, 250 cc and 500 cc classes; Read won seven World Championships, took 52 Grand Prix victories and stood on a Grand Prix podium 121 times during his professional motorcycle racing career.

In the 1979 Queen's Birthday Honours, Read was appointed Member of the Order of the British Empire (MBE) "for services to motor cycle racing". In 2013, the F.I.M. inducted Read into the MotoGP Hall of Fame.

== Early years ==
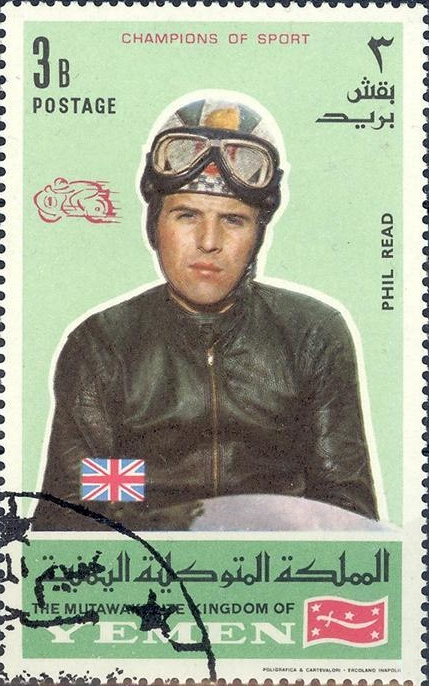
Read appeared on a 1969 Yemeni stamp

Born in the Bedfordshire town of Luton on 1 January 1939, Read was a keen road-rider and worked as an apprentice fitter at Brown and Green, a Luton manufacturer of industrial machinery. His first road machine was a Velocette KSS which he started on at the UK legal-minimum riding age of sixteen in 1955, followed by a BSA Gold Star DBD32. He started amateur short-circuit racing in 1958 on a Duke BSA Gold Star. In 1960, he won the Junior Manx Grand Prix on a Manx Norton at record speed followed by a victory at the 1961 Isle of Man TT 350cc Junior TT where he defeated Gary Hocking on the more powerful MV Agusta. He became one of the few riders to win a TT race at his very first attempt.

Read placed second in the 350cc and 500cc races at the 1961 North West 200 in Northern Ireland on Manx Nortons.

Read was a two-time winner of the Thruxton 500 endurance race in 1962 and 1963 riding Syd Lawton's Norton Dominator 650SS machines.

In 1963, the up and coming Read was temporarily drafted-in to fill Derek Minter's absence in the Scuderia Duke Gilera Grand Prix team, as Minter had been seriously injured in May at Brands Hatch after a last-lap accident when dicing for the lead with Dunstall rider Dave Downer, after which Downer died.

The 1963 Isle of Man Senior TT was won by Mike Hailwood on an MV Agusta, while the Duke team came second (John Hartle) and third (Read). In the following Dutch TT at Assen, the finishing order was: first (Hartle), second (Read), with Mike Hailwood's MV retiring in the 500cc class. Read came second to Hailwood in the 500cc Belgium Grand Prix race. Minter recovered and returned in time to reclaim his team place for the next event, the Ulster Grand Prix at Dundrod in August. Read scored two second-place finishes to end the season ranked fourth in the 1963 500cc World Championship despite riding six-year-old machines that were no longer competitive. The Scuderia Duke Gilera Grand Prix team disbanded at the end of 1963.

== Two stroke years ==
During the mid-1960s, Yamaha had prolific riders in Read, Canadian Mike Duff and later Bill Ivy. In 1964, Read gave Yamaha their first world title when he won the 250cc class.

He dominated the 1964 250cc World Championship with seven Grand Prix victories. Read made history at the 1965 Isle of Man TT when he set the first ever 100 mph lap on a 250cc machine although he was forced to retire with mechanical problems. For 1966, Yamaha introduced a new, four cylinder 250cc motorcycle; however, teething problems with the new engine meant he would lose the crown to Hailwood. In 1967 he would battle Hailwood on his six-cylinder Honda RC166 all the way to the final round. They would end up tied but, Hailwood took the crown due to having five wins to Read's four. Read took over from Frank Perris in 1967 as representative for the Grand Prix Riders' Association.

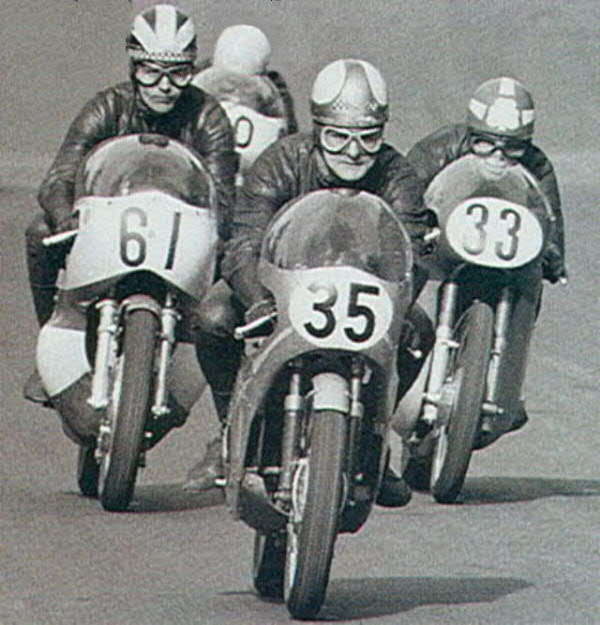
Read on 250 Yamaha number 61 following Mike Hailwood 35 with Rod Gould 33 close behind, around 1967 at Cadwell Park

The 1968 season proved to be controversial for Read. The Yamaha factory had wanted Read to concentrate on winning the 125cc title and teammate Bill Ivy to take the 250cc crown. After winning the 125cc championship, Read decided to disobey team orders and fight Ivy for the 250cc title. They finished the season tied in the points and Read was awarded the championship based on elapsed times. It proved a costly decision for Read, as Yamaha would never offer him another ride.

In January 1969, Read lent his support to a project intended to provide racing engines to the general public – dubbed Read Weslake, it was a prototype Weslake four-stroke 500cc vertical twin, with four valves per cylinder and gear-driven camshafts. Initially the engine was installed into standard Rickman Street Metisse frame intended for a Triumph Bonneville engine.

Read was to be rider and development consultant. He decided that the Metisse frame was too heavy, and despite intentions to manufacture a lighter race frame, he decided to abandon the Rickman frame in favour of a Reynolds frame built by Ken Sprayson for Tom Arter and his rider Peter Williams who had a project to replace their ageing Matchless G50. Read was to be based at Weslake in Rye, England to develop the project further, releasing Peter Williams for his Norton work, but Read pulled out in November. The engine project continued, enlarging the capacity to 700cc in 1970 with some race entries sponsored by Geoff Monty before finally folding.

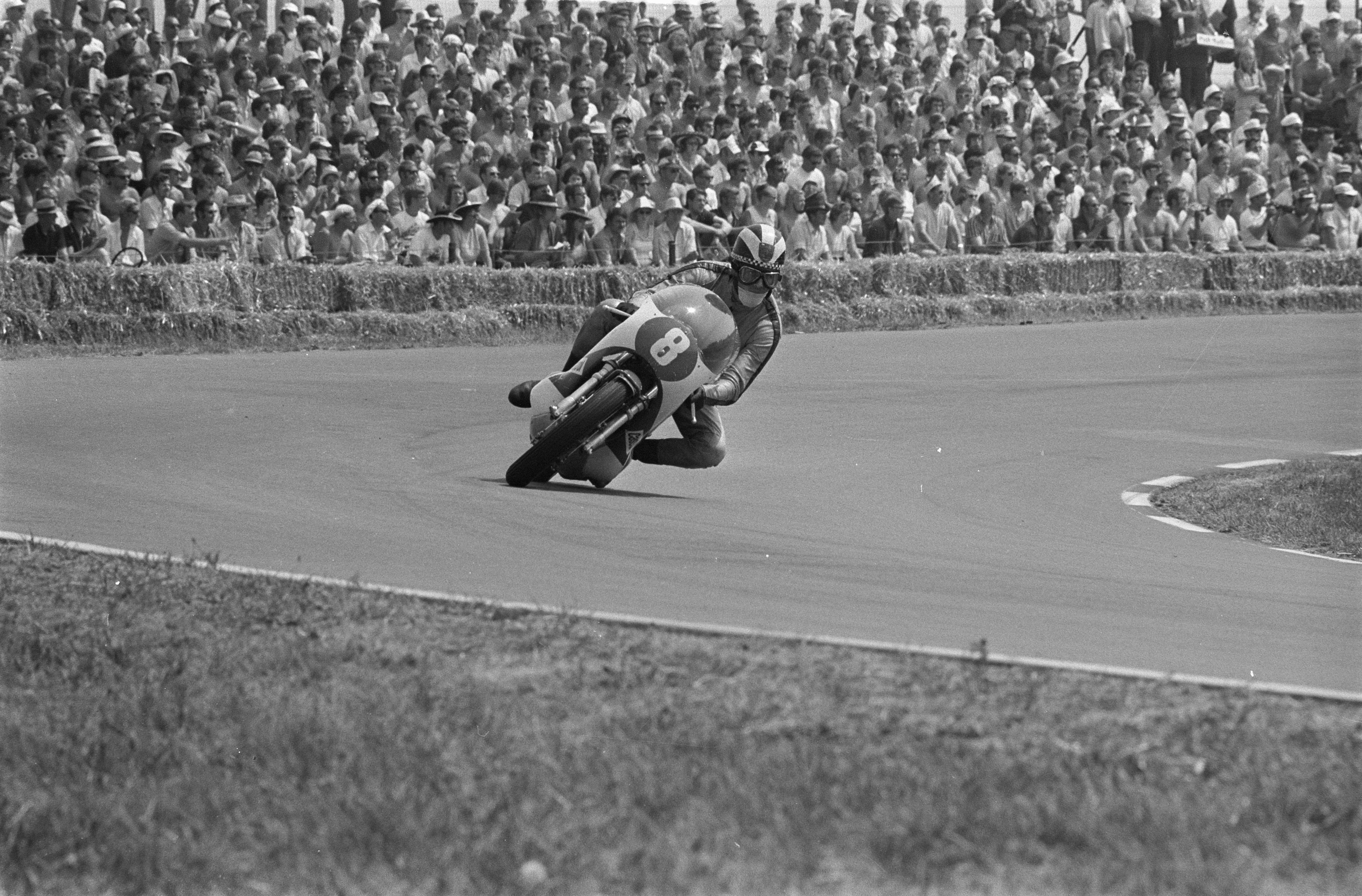
Phil Read (8) finished second at the 1970 250cc Dutch TT

After sitting out most of the 1969 and 1970 grand prix seasons when the major Japanese factories all withdrew from Grands Prix racing, he concentrated on the major British and European international meetings.

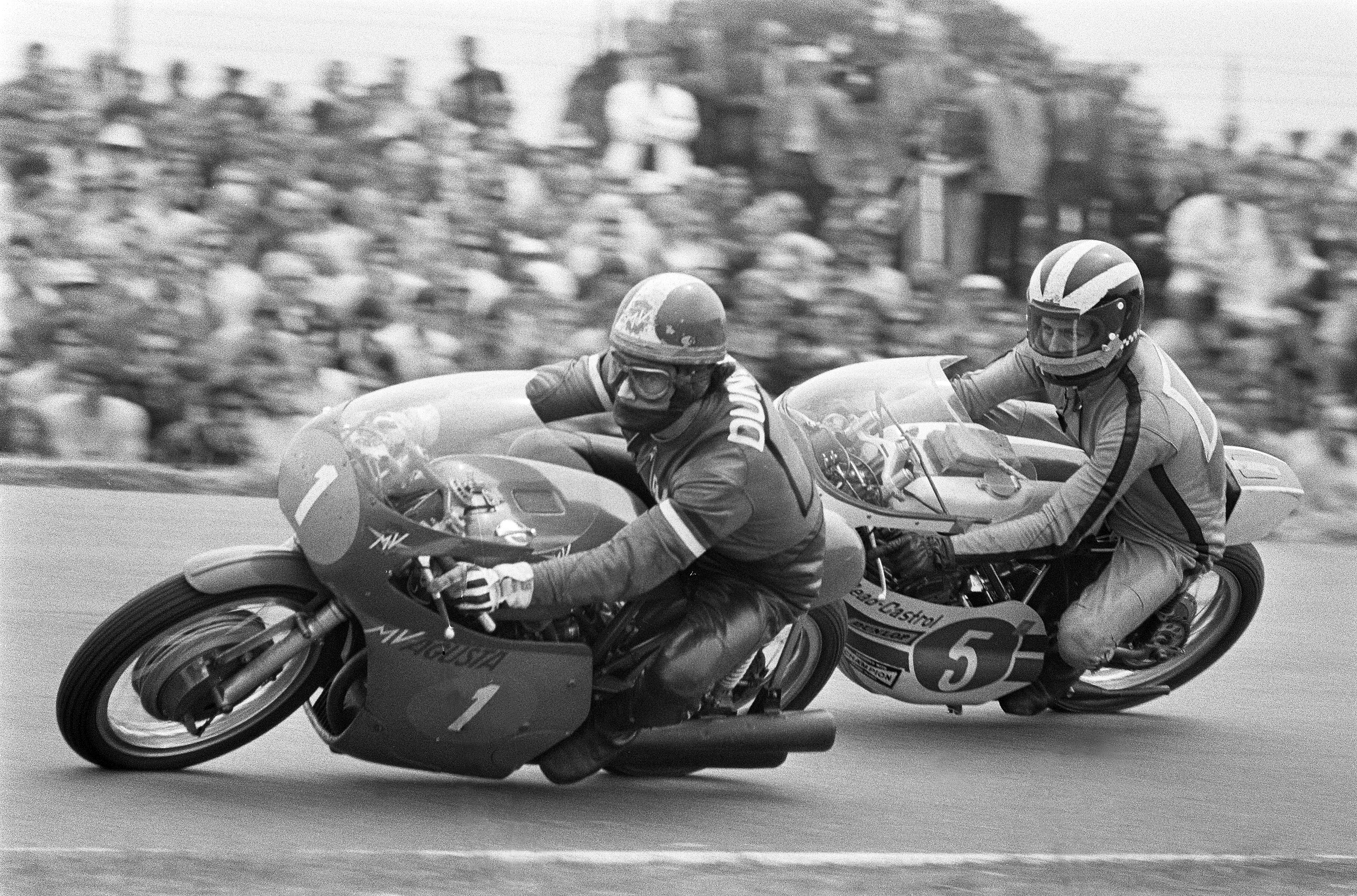
Giacomo Agostini (1) and Read (5) racing during the 1971 350cc Dutch TT.

Read returned full-time to the Grands Prix circuit in 1971 on a special privateer production Yamaha developed under the direction of the Dutchman, Ferry Brouwer with twin disc brakes, improved horsepower and aerodynamics together with help from Eric Cheney (frame), Helmut Fath (dry clutch) and Rod Quaife (six speed transmission) but no factory support. On this bike he was able win the first three Grands Prix of the season and go on to claim his fifth world championship.

Read began the 1972 250cc season with victories in France and at the Isle of Man TT but failed to score consistently as Yamaha factory team rider Jarno Saarinen won four of the last six Grand Prix races to clinch the 250cc World Championship, after a season-long battle with Renzo Pasolini and Rod Gould.

Read also had 'guest' rides as part of the JPS team Norton for 1972, finishing fourth in the Daytona 200 mile race. Other riders were Norton factory employee Peter Williams and Tony Rutter as third rider. Rutter was soon replaced by John Cooper

== Four stroke years ==
In 1972, Read accepted an offer to ride for the MV Agusta factory racing team in the 350cc class to help the defending World Champion Giacomo Agostini fend off the increasing threat presented by Japanese motorcycle manufacturers. By the early 1970s, advancements in two-stroke engine technology were made obvious as Yamaha and their top rider Saarinen began to challenge Agostini and the dominant MV Agusta team for the first time in years. Saarinen won three races in the 1972 350cc World Championship, including a victory at the West German Grand Prix where he gave Agostini his first defeat in a head-to-head race since the 1967 Canadian Grand Prix. Read took the victory at the 350cc East German Grand Prix after Agostini and Saarinen retired with mechanical problems, then finished second to Agostini at the 350cc Swedish Grand Prix to help Agostini successfully defend his 350cc World Championship. The threat from Yamaha's performance was so strong that the MV Agusta factory was forced to produce a new 350cc motorcycle.

In 1973, Read would compete for MV Agusta alongside Agostini in both the 350cc and 500cc classes. Yamaha developed a new 4-cylinder two-stroke Yamaha YZR500 motorcycle for Saarinen which he rode to an early lead in the 500cc world championship with victories in France and Austria. Read scored his first victory of the year at the third round in West Germany when Saarinen's chain broke while he was challenging Read for the win. Yamaha and Saarinen were leading the World Championship when an accident at the 1973 Nations Grand Prix claimed the lives of Saarinen and Pasolini. The loss of Saarinen caused Yamaha to withdraw their team from the World Championship out of respect for their fallen rider.

Without any other significant opposition from other manufacturers, the MV Agusta team dominated the remainder of the season. Agostini took three victories to Read's two victories however, Agostini was unable to overcome an early season points deficit allowing Read to win his first World Championship in the premier 500cc division. Read's victory made him the first competitor to win world championships in the 125 cc, 250 cc and 500 cc classes, a feat only matched by Valentino Rossi. His victory also marked the first time that a World Championship had been won by a motorcycle equipped with disc brakes. Read also won the prestigious Mallory Park Race of the Year in 1973.

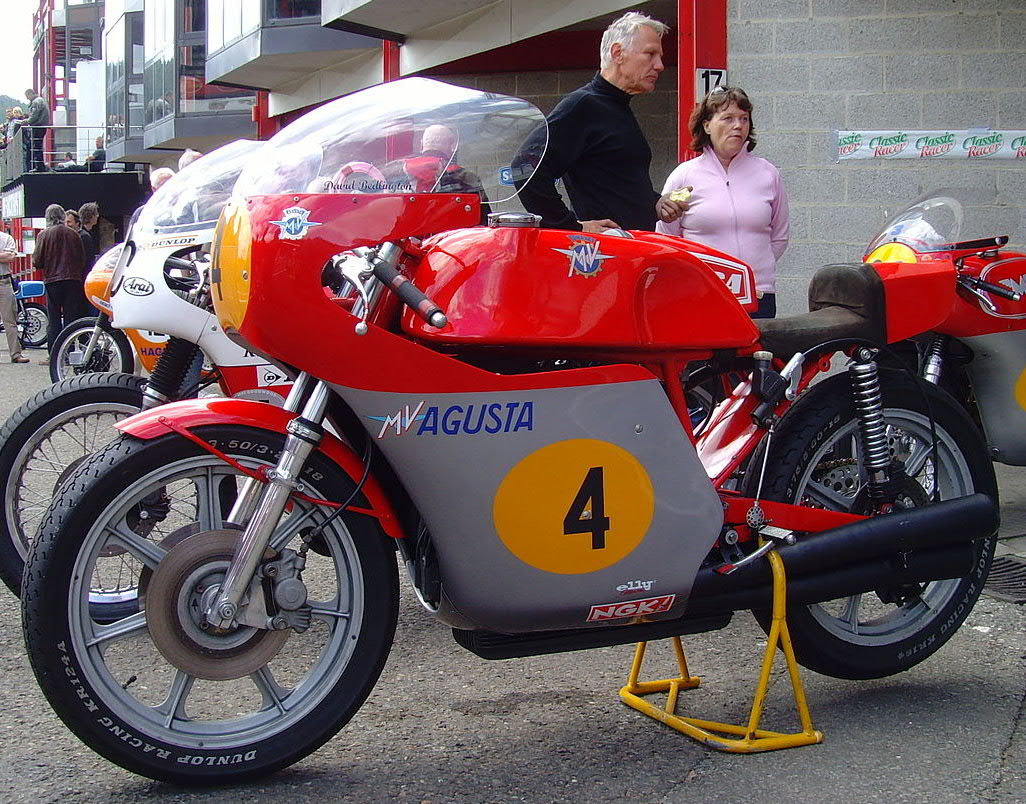
Phil Read's 1974 MV 500

Agostini was frustrated with MV Agusta's lack of development and the growing threat of Japanese two-stroke technology, so he made the decision to join the Yamaha factory team for the 1974 season leaving Read as the top MV Agusta rider with Franco Bonera as his teammate. Read successfully defended his title with four Grand Prix victories as Agostini suffered from injuries and mechanical problems with Yamaha. The 35-year-old Read was the oldest 500cc World Champion since Leslie Graham won the title in 1949 at the age of 37. His victory would mark the last world championship for the legendary Italian marque as well as the last time that a four-stroke machine would win a title until the advent of the MotoGP class in 2002.

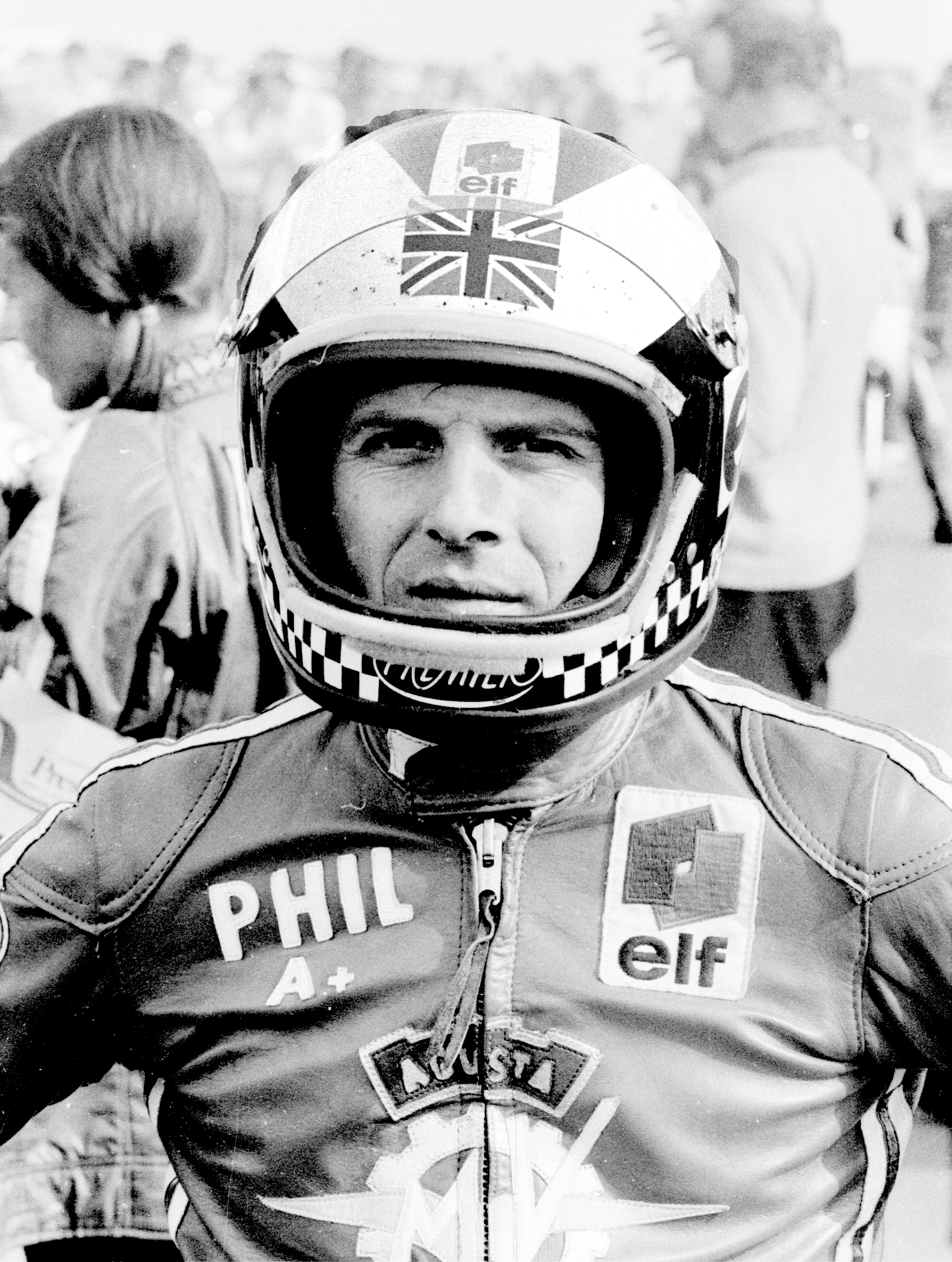
Phil Read in 1975 wearing a Premier helmet in his usual design

In the 1975 500cc World Championship, Read battled Agostini in a season-long battle that was not decided until the final race of the season. Agostini took the early lead with victories in France, Germany and Italy but then he suffered two consecutive mechanical failures in Belgium and Sweden. Read won the Belgian Grand Prix then finished second to Barry Sheene (Suzuki) in Sweden to take the championship points lead. Agostini recovered to win the Finnish Grand Prix and retake the points lead as Read's motorcycle failed to finish the race.

Read still had a mathematical chance to win the title going into the final round in Czechoslovakia where, he needed to win the race with Agostini placing no higher than eighth in order to win the championship. Read did win the final race however, Agostini finished in second place to clinch the World Championship for the Yamaha team. Read actually scored more points than Agostini during the season but fell victim to FIM scoring rules at the time which only recognized the top six of ten results. Read placed second in the final standings.

The MV Agusta factory racing team withdrew from the World Championships following the 1975 season. The last remaining manufacturer to compete with four-stroke machinery, the team had struggled to remain competitive as advancements in two-stroke engine technology by Japanese manufacturers were becoming evident. Once the dominant manufacturer with a streak of 17 consecutive 500 Class World Championships, the company's focus had turned to the aviation industry following the death of Count Domenico Agusta in February 1971. The Count's passion for motorcycle racing had been the driving force behind the MV Agusta team, and without his presence, the racing team's importance within the company began to wither.

Realizing that four-stroke machinery was no longer competitive, Read chose to campaign a privateer two-stroke Suzuki RG 500 in the 1976 500cc World Championship. The 37-year-old was still competitive, finishing third in the 500cc Austrian Grand Prix then fought a dramatic race-long battle with Sheene at the 500cc Nations Grand Prix where he finished in second place by a narrow 0.1 second margin. He held second place in the points standings entering Round 6 of the championship in Belgium where he qualified in second position behind Sheene. Read then abruptly disbanded his team and withdrew from the World Championships without competing in Belgium. He later cited a lack of funding for the withdrawal. Although he never again competed in the World Championships, he continued to compete in British domestic racing.

Read entered TT events from 1977, winning the F1 (Formula 1) race on the works Honda CB750 SOHC and Senior race on a Suzuki. Again on the Honda for the 1978 Isle of Man F1 TT, he recorded a DNF but was placed 4th in the Classic. These races led to Honda producing a limited-production of 150 'Phil Read Replica' Formula 1 race-styled roadsters based on the CB750F2 with styling accessories by Seeley in Honda Britain colours of blue and red.

Read competed in the 1978 Isle of Man TT against Mike Hailwood, who made a famous comeback riding a Ducati 900SS provided by Manchester dealer Sports Motorcycles. After another four-year hiatus, Read's last race was at the 1982 Isle of Man TT at the age of 43.

A lesser-known aspect of Read's career was his involvement in endurance racing. He rode a Honda in the 24-hour Bol d'Or endurance race at Le Mans; and he won the Thruxton 500 endurance race in 1962 and 1963.

== Controversy ==
Read was well known within the racing paddock for his forthright and sometimes outspoken views, not least when it came to the dangers of the Snaefell Mountain Course.

In particular this reflected Read's decision following the death of Gilberto Parlotti at the 1972 Isle of Man TT. The death of Parlotti prompted Parlotti's close friend, and Read's MV Augusta teammate, Giacomo Agostini, to publicly state that he would never again compete at the TT. This decision had far reaching consequences for the TT and would lead to a walk-out of the top Grand Prix stars many of whom resorted to severe criticism of the organisation and safety at the event, with Read in the vanguard of the critics.

In certain aspects the comments were justified and resulted in the Fédération Internationale de Motocyclisme taking the decision that the Isle of Man TT would be withdrawn from the World Championship calendar after the 1976 races. However, the decision did cause a high degree of dissatisfaction with many pure road racing fans and resulted in some, not least those on the Isle of Man, forming a dislike of Read.

As a consequence of the withdrawal of the Isle of Man from the World Grand Prix Championship, a significant increase in prize money was pumped into the 1977 Isle of Man TT in addition to the creation of the TT Formula 1 World Championship. This in turn resulted in some candid cavilling concerning Read's decision to return to the TT, with him being subjected to numerous jeers. This continued into the 1978 TT, with Read cast very much in the role of a Pantomime Villain against the celebrated return of Mike Hailwood.

However, in his defence Read always maintained that his sentiment reflected riders being contractually required to race at the Isle of Man as part of a World Championship campaign, as opposed to having the freedom of conscience governing their decision.

In time most fans came to accept the conclusions taken in 1972 and for many years both Read and Agostini, along with many other former competitors, were frequent guests at the TT Races where they would ride on exhibition and parade laps.

== Business interests ==
In 1967, Read was domiciled in the tax haven of Guernsey, where he had a business selling boats.

During the 1970s period, Read started to distribute Premier helmets and gave his name to a range of motorcycle clothing, including marketing a 'Phil Read Replica' full-face helmet with the familiar design and colour scheme of black with three white flashes and chequer strip.

Read also opened a Honda dealership at Hersham, Surrey in 1979.

== Personal life and death ==
Read lived in Canterbury, Kent, spending the summers visiting race tracks around Europe and demonstrating some of the motorcycles from his racing career.

Read died from heart failure and chronic obstructive pulmonary disease at his flat in Canterbury, on 6 October 2022, aged 83.

== Grand Prix motorcycle racing results ==
Points system from 1950 to 1968:

**Position**	1	2	3	4	5	6
**Points**	8	6	4	3	2	1

Points system from 1969 onwards:

**Position**	1	2	3	4	5	6	7	8	9	10
**Points**	15	12	10	8	6	5	4	3	2	1

(key) (Races in bold indicate pole position; races in italics indicate fastest lap)

Year	Class	Team	1	2	3	4	5	6	7	8	9	10	11	12	13	Points	Rank	Wins
1961	125cc	EMC	ESP -	GER -	FRA -	IOM; NC	NED; 4	BEL -	DDR -	ULS -	NAT -	SWE -	ARG -			3	12th	0
1961	350cc	Norton		GER -		IOM; 1	NED; 4		DDR -	ULS; 4	NAT -	SWE -				13	5th	1
1961	500cc	Norton		GER -	FRA -	IOM; NC	NED; 4	BEL -	DDR -	ULS -	NAT -	SWE -	ARG -			3	15th	0
1962	350cc	Norton	IOM; 7	NED; 6		ULS -	DDR -	NAT -	FIN -							1	15th	0
1962	500cc	Norton	IOM; NC	NED; 3	BEL -	ULS; 3	DDR -	NAT; 4	FIN -	ARG -						11	3rd	0
1963	250cc	Yamaha	ESP -	GER -	IOM -	NED -	BEL -	ULS -	DDR -	NAT -		ARG -	JPN; 3			4	10th	0
1963	350cc	Gilera		GER; 3	IOM; NC	NED -		ULS -	DDR -	NAT -	FIN -		JPN -			4	11th	0
1963	500cc	Gilera			IOM; 3	NED; 2	BEL; 2	ULS -	DDR -	NAT -	FIN -	ARG -	JPN -			16	4th	0
1964	125cc	Yamaha	USA -	ESP -	FRA -	IOM -	NED; 2		GER -	DDR -	ULS -	FIN -	NAT -	JPN -		6	8th	0
1964	250cc	Yamaha	USA -	ESP; 3	FRA; 1	IOM; NC	NED; 2	BEL -	GER; 1	DDR; 1	ULS; 1		NAT; 1	JPN -		46	1st	5
1964	350cc	AJS				IOM; 2	NED -		GER -	DDR -	ULS -	FIN -	NAT -	JPN -		6	6th	0
1964	500cc	Matchless	USA; 2			IOM; NC	NED; 6	BEL; 2	GER; 3	DDR -						25	3rd	1
1964	500cc	Norton									ULS; 1	FIN -	NAT -	JPN -		25	3rd	1
1965	125cc	Yamaha	USA -	GER -	ESP -	FRA -	IOM; 1	NED -		DDR -	TCH -	ULS -	FIN -	NAT -	JPN -	8	10th	1
1965	250cc	Yamaha	USA; 1	GER; 1	ESP; 1	FRA; 1	IOM; NC	NED; 1	BEL; 2	DDR; 2	TCH; 1	ULS; 1	FIN -	NAT -	JPN -	56	1st	7
1965	350cc	Yamaha		GER -			IOM; 2	NED -		DDR -	TCH -	ULS -	FIN -	NAT -	JPN -	6	9th	0
1966	125cc	Yamaha	ESP; 4	GER; 3		NED; 3		DDR; 4	TCH -	FIN; 1	ULS; 3	IOM; 2	NAT; 4	JPN; 5		29	4th	1
1966	250cc	Yamaha	ESP; 3	GER -	FRA -	NED; 2	BEL; 2	DDR; 2	TCH; 2	FIN -	ULS -	IOM; NC	NAT -	JPN; 2		34	2nd	0
1966	350cc	Yamaha		GER -	FRA -	NED -		DDR -	TCH -	FIN -	ULS -	IOM -	NAT -	JPN; 1		8	8th	1
1967	125cc	Yamaha	ESP; 2	GER -	FRA; 2	IOM; 1	NED; 1	BEL -	DDR; 2	TCH -	FIN -	ULS; 2	NAT -	CAN -	JPN -	40	2nd	2
1967	250cc	Yamaha	ESP; 1	GER; 2	FRA; 2	IOM; 2	NED -	BEL -	DDR; 1	TCH; 1	FIN -	ULS -	NAT; 1	CAN; 2	JPN -	50	2nd	4
1968	125cc	Yamaha	GER; 1	ESP -	IOM; 1	NED; 1		DDR; 1	TCH; 1	FIN; 1	ULS; 2	NAT; 2				40	1st	6
1968	250cc	Yamaha	GER -	ESP; 1	IOM; NC	NED; 2	BEL; 1	DDR; 2	TCH; 1	FIN; 1	ULS -	NAT; 1				46	1st	5
1969	250cc	Yamaha	ESP -	GER -	FRA -	IOM; NC	NED -	BEL -	DDR -	TCH -	FIN -	ULS -	NAT; 1	YUG -		15	13th	1
1969	350cc	Yamaha	ESP -	GER -		IOM; NC	NED -		DDR -	TCH -	FIN -	ULS -	NAT; 1	YUG -		15	13th	1
1970	250cc	Yamaha	GER -	FRA -	YUG -	IOM -	NED; 2	BEL -	DDR -	TCH -	FIN -	ULS -	NAT; 3	ESP -		22	12th	0
1970	350cc	Yamaha	GER -		YUG -	IOM -	NED; 3		DDR -	TCH -	FIN -	ULS -	NAT -	ESP -		10	17th	0
1971	250cc	Yamaha	AUT -	GER; 1	IOM; 1	NED; 1	BEL -	DDR; 3	TCH -	SWE -	FIN; 10	ULS -	NAT; 6	ESP; 2		73	1st	3
1971	350cc	Yamaha	AUT -	GER -	IOM; NC	NED; 2		DDR -	TCH -	SWE -	FIN -	ULS -	NAT -	ESP -		12	16th	0
1971	500cc	Ducati	AUT -	GER -	IOM -	NED -	BEL -	DDR -		SWE -	FIN -	ULS -	NAT; 4	ESP -		8	18th	0
1972	250cc	Yamaha	GER -	FRA; 1	AUT -	NAT -	IOM; 1	YUG -	NED; 4	BEL; 3	DDR -	TCH; 3	SWE -	FIN -	ESP -	58	4th	2
1972	350cc	MV Agusta	GER -	FRA -	AUT -	NAT; 4	IOM; NC	YUG; 3	NED; 5		DDR; 1	TCH -	SWE; 2	FIN -	ESP -	51	5th	1
1973	350cc	MV Agusta	FRA; 2	AUT -	GER -	NAT -	IOM -	YUG -	NED; 2		TCH; 3	SWE; 3	FIN; 2	ESP -		56	3rd	0
1973	500cc	MV Agusta	FRA; 2	AUT -	GER; 1		IOM -	YUG -	NED; 1	BEL; 2	TCH; 2	SWE; 1	FIN; 2	ESP; 1		84	1st	4
1974	500cc	MV Agusta	**FRA**; 1	GER -	AUT -	NAT; 3	IOM -	NED; 3	**BEL**; 1	SWE; 2	**FIN**; 1	**TCH**; 1				82	1st	4
1975	500cc	MV Agusta	FRA; 3	AUT; 3	GER; 2	NAT; 2	IOM -	NED; 3	BEL; 1	SWE; 2	FIN; Ret	TCH; 1				76	2nd	2
1976	500cc	Suzuki	FRA; Ret	AUT; 3	NAT; 2	IOM -	NED -	BEL -	SWE -	FIN -	TCH -	GER -				22	10th	0

== Bibliography ==
- Read, Phil (1 January 1970). Prince of Speed. Arthur Barker Ltd. ISBN 978-0213001728.
- Read, Phil; Wright, Graeme (1976). Phil Read: The Real Story. London: Macdonald and Jane's. ISBN 978-0354040242.
- Read, Phil (15 August 2014). Rebel Read: The Prince of Speed. Redline Books. ISBN 978-0955527876.

Sporting positions
Preceded by None	TT Formula One World Champion; 1977	Succeeded by Mike Hailwood
