= List of Grand Prix motorcycle racers: C =

Name	Seasons	World Championships	MotoGP Wins	500cc Wins	350cc Wins	Moto2 Wins	250cc Wins	Moto3 Wins	125cc Wins	80cc Wins	50cc Wins	MotoE Wins
(Italy) Luca Cadalora	1984-2000	3; 250cc - 1991-1992; 125cc - 1986	0	8	0	0	21	0	4	0	0	0
(Italy) Gaspare Caffiero	2001	0	0	0	0	0	0	0	0	0	0	0
(Argentina) Benedicto Caldarella	1962-1964	0	0	1	0	0	0	0	0	0	0	0
(Italy) Kevin Calia	2011-2012	0	0	0	0	0	0	0	0	0	0	0
(Spain) Marcello Cama	1953, 1955-1956	0	0	0	0	0	0	0	0	0	0	0
(Italy) Paolo Campanelli	1953, 1955, 1962, 1969-1970	0	0	0	0	0	0	0	0	0	0	0
(Australia) Keith Campbell	1954-1955, 1957-1958	1; 350cc - 1957	0	0	3	0	0	0	0	0	0	0
(Australia) Malcolm Campbell	1988	0	0	0	0	0	0	0	0	0	0	0
(United Kingdom) William Campbell	1950	0	0	0	0	0	0	0	0	0	0	0
(United Kingdom) Leon Camier	2002-2003, 2014	0	0	0	0	0	0	0	0	0	0	0
(Canada) Frank Camillieri	1967	0	0	0	0	0	0	0	0	0	0	0
(Switzerland) Jean Campiche	1969-1972	0	0	0	0	0	0	0	0	0	0	0
(Spain) Salvador Cañellas	1968, 1970	0	0	0	0	0	0	0	1	0	1	0
(Italy) Niccolò Canepa	2009-2010, 2019-2020, 2022	0	0	0	0	0	0	0	0	0	0	0
(Spain) Aron Canet	2016-	0	0	0	0	5	0	6	0	0	0	0
(United Kingdom) Maurice Cann	1949-1952	0	0	0	0	0	3	0	0	0	0	0
(Italy) Michele Cannizzaro	1970	0	0	0	0	0	0	0	0	0	0	0
(Italy) Loris Capirossi	1990-2011	3; 250cc - 1998; 125cc - 1990, 1991	7	2	0	0	12	0	8	0	0	0
(Italy) Stefano Caracchi	1983-1984, 1987-1989	0	0	0	0	0	0	0	0	0	0	0
(Spain) Jordi Carchano	2004-2006	0	0	0	0	0	0	0	0	0	0	0
(Andorra) Xavier Cardelus	2018-2021, 2024	0	0	0	0	0	0	0	0	0	0	0
(Colombia) Martín Cárdenas	2005-2006	0	0	0	0	0	0	0	0	0	0	0
(Spain) Jose Luis Cardoso	1994-2002, 2006	0	0	0	0	0	0	0	0	0	0	0
(Spain) Carlos Cardús	1983-1993	0	0	0	0	0	4	0	0	0	0	0
(Spain) Ricard Cardús	2007-2008, 2010-2017	0	0	0	0	0	0	0	0	0	0	0
(Italy) Federico Caricasulo	2014-2015	0	0	0	0	0	0	0	0	0	0	0
(Spain) Luis Carlos Maurel	1994-1995	0	0	0	0	0	0	0	0	0	0	0
(Sweden) Curt-Ivan Carlsson	1965, 1971-1973	0	0	0	0	0	0	0	0	0	0	0
(Sweden) Per-Edward Carlsson	1975-1979, 1981-1982	0	0	0	0	0	0	0	0	0	0	0
(Italy) Fabio Carpani	1998	0	0	0	0	0	0	0	0	0	0	0
(Spain) Álvaro Carpe	2024-	0	0	0	0	0	0	0	0	0	0	0
(United Kingdom) Phil Carpenter	1973-1974	0	0	1	0	0	0	0	0	0	0	0
(Italy) Nicola Carraro	2022-	0	0	0	0	0	0	0	0	0	0	0
(Spain) Ana Carrasco	2013-2015, 2022-2023	0	0	0	0	0	0	0	0	0	0	0
(United Kingdom) Cliff Carr	1969-1970	0	0	0	0	0	0	0	0	0	0	0
(France) Cyril Carrillo	2007-2009	0	0	0	0	0	0	0	0	0	0	0
(United Kingdom) Alan Carter	1983-1986, 1988, 1990	0	0	0	0	0	1	0	0	0	0	0
(Republic of Ireland) Phil Carter	1952, 1959	0	0	0	0	0	0	0	0	0	0	0
(Italy) Mattia Casadei	2019-2025	1 MotoE - 2023	0	0	0	0	0	0	0	0	0	13
(Italy) Bruno Casanova	1987-1994	0	0	0	0	0	0	0	1	0	0	0
(Chile) Vincenco Cascino	1981	0	0	0	0	0	0	0	0	0	0	0
(United Kingdom) Dennis Casement	1976	0	0	0	0	0	0	0	0	0	0	0
(Italy) Paolo Casoli	1986-1993	0	0	0	0	0	0	0	1	0	0	0
(Australia) Kevin Cass	1965-1967	0	0	0	0	0	0	0	0	0	0	0
(Spain) Miguel Castilla	1994	0	0	0	0	0	0	0	0	0	0	0
(France) Renald Castillon	2014	0	0	0	0	0	0	0	0	0	0	0
(Italy) Corrado Catalano	1987-1993	0	0	0	0	0	0	0	0	0	0	0
(United Kingdom) George Catlin	1958	0	0	0	0	0	0	0	0	0	0	0
(Italy) Celeste Cavaciuti	1949	0	0	0	0	0	0	0	0	0	0	0
(Italy) Lucio Cecchinello	1994, 1996-2003	0	0	0	0	0	0	0	6	0	0	0
(France) Pierre Cecchini	1976	0	0	0	0	0	0	0	0	0	0	0
(Venezuela) Johnny Cecotto	1975-1980	1; 350cc - 1975	0	3	9	0	2	0	0	0	0	0
(Brazil) Adu Celso-Santos	1972-1975	0	0	0	1	0	0	0	0	0	0	0
(Italy) Enrico Cereda	1976-1980	0	0	0	0	0	0	0	0	0	0	0
(Italy) Federico Ceroni	1998	0	0	0	0	0	0	0	0	0	0	0
(United Kingdom) Dave Chadwick	1955-1959	0	0	0	0	0	0	0	0	0	0	0
(France) Jean-Francois Chaffin	1969	0	0	0	0	0	0	0	0	0	0	0
(United States) Doug Chandler	1991-1994	0	0	0	0	0	0	0	0	0	0	0
(New Zealand) Rogan Chandler	2019	0	0	0	0	0	0	0	0	0	0	0
(United Kingdom) Ron Chandler	1966, 1968-1971	0	0	0	0	0	0	0	0	0	0	0
(Thailand) Somkiat Chantra	2018-2025	0	0	0	0	2	0	0	0	0	0	0
(United Kingdom) Derek Chatterton	1969-1970, 1972-1973, 1975-1977	0	0	0	0	0	0	0	0	0	0	0
(United Kingdom) Mick Chatterton	1967, 1969-1972	0	0	0	0	0	0	0	0	0	0	0
(Spain) Carlos Checa	1995-2007, 2010	0	0	2	0	0	0	0	0	0	0	0
(Spain) David Checa	2000-2002, 2005	0	0	0	0	0	0	0	0	0	0	0
(Spain) Jean-Claude Chemarin	1974	0	0	0	0	0	0	0	0	0	0	0
(Switzerland) Bastien Chesaux	2008-2009	0	0	0	0	0	0	0	0	0	0	0
(Italy) Riccardo Chiarello	2001	0	0	0	0	0	0	0	0	0	0	0
(Italy) Pierfrancesco Chili	1986-1993, 1995	0	0	1	0	0	4	0	0	0	0	0
(Czech Republic) Ladislav Chmelík	2009-2011	0	0	0	0	0	0	0	0	0	0	0
(Italy) Pieraldo Cipriani	1977	0	0	0	0	0	0	0	0	0	0	0
(Italy) Claudio Cipriani	1998	0	0	0	0	0	0	0	0	0	0	0
(United Kingdom) Denis Clancy	1970	0	0	0	0	0	0	0	0	0	0	0
(United Kingdom) Harold Clark	1954	0	0	0	0	0	0	0	0	0	0	0
(United Kingdom) John Clark	1954-1955	0	0	0	0	0	0	0	0	0	0	0
(Australia) Brendan Clarke	2001	0	0	0	0	0	0	0	0	0	0	0
(Australia) Sam Clarke	2012	0	0	0	0	0	0	0	0	0	0	0
(United Kingdom) Noel Clegg	1974-1975	0	0	0	0	0	0	0	0	0	0	0
(Italy) Oscar Clemengich	1949	0	0	0	0	0	0	0	0	0	0	0
(Italy) Ivan Clementi	1998, 2000	0	0	0	0	0	0	0	0	0	0	0
(Italy) Ivan Clementi	1998, 2000	0	0	0	0	0	0	0	0	0	0	0
(France) Hugo Clere	2016	0	0	0	0	0	0	0	0	0	0	0
(Spain) Óscar Climent	2011	0	0	0	0	1	0	0	0	0	0	0
(United Kingdom) Adrian Coates	2000	0	0	0	0	0	0	0	0	0	0	0
(Italy) Adriano Cocchi	1972	0	0	0	0	0	0	0	0	0	0	0
(France) Christophe Cogan	1996	0	0	0	0	0	0	0	0	0	0	0
(United Kingdom) Kev Coghlan	2005-2007, 2010-2011	0	0	0	0	0	0	0	0	0	0	0
(Switzerland) Marco Colandrea	2011-2012	0	0	0	0	0	0	0	0	0	0	0
(New Zealand) Rod Coleman	1951-1954	0	0	0	1	0	0	0	0	0	0	0
(Italy) Michael Coletti	2013	0	0	0	0	0	0	0	0	0	0	0
(France) Jacques Collot	1954-1955	0	0	0	0	0	0	0	0	0	0	0
(Italy) Giuseppe Colnago	1952-1953, 1955, 1957	0	0	1	0	0	0	0	0	0	0	0
(Italy) Roberto Colombo	1952, 1954-1957	0	0	0	0	0	0	0	0	0	0	0
(Netherlands) Leo Commu	1969-1971	0	0	0	0	0	0	0	0	0	0	0
(Italy) Pierluigi Conforti	1975-1982	0	0	0	0	0	0	0	1	0	0	0
(United Kingdom) Chris Conn	1964-1967	0	0	0	0	0	0	0	0	0	0	0
(Australia) Craig Connell	1994	0	0	0	0	0	0	0	0	0	0	0
(Italy) Giuseppe Consalvi	1970-1971	0	0	0	0	0	0	0	0	0	0	0
(Switzerland) Marc-Antoine Constantin	1979	0	0	0	0	0	0	0	0	0	0	0
(Italy) Michele Conti	2001, 2003, 2005, 2006	0	0	0	0	0	0	0	0	0	0	0
(United Kingdom) Max Cook	2025	0	0	0	0	0	0	0	0	0	0	0
(United Kingdom) John Cooper	1965-1968	0	0	0	0	0	0	0	0	0	0	0
(Canada) Mick Coopey	1967	0	0	0	0	0	0	0	0	0	0	0
(Belgium) Guy Cooremans	1979	0	0	0	0	0	0	0	0	0	0	0
(United Kingdom) Frank Cope	1956	0	0	0	0	0	0	0	0	0	0	0
(Italy) Angelo Copeta	1952-1955	0	0	0	0	0	0	0	1	0	0	0
(Netherlands) Roel Cornelis	1975	0	0	0	0	0	0	0	0	0	0	0
(Switzerland) Jacques Cornu	1980-1990	0	0	0	0	0	3	0	0	0	0	0
(Colombia) Mauro Corradini	1977	0	0	0	0	0	0	0	0	0	0	0
(Australia) Troy Corser	1997	0	0	0	0	0	0	0	0	0	0	0
(Italy) Simone Corsi	2002-2022, 2024	0	0	0	0	0	0	0	5	0	0	0
(Spain) Gabriel Corsin	1954	0	0	0	0	0	0	0	0	0	0	0
(Spain) Miguel Cortes	1978-1979	0	0	0	0	0	0	0	0	0	0	0
(Germany) Sandro Cortese	2005-2017	1 Moto3 - 2012	0	0	0	0	0	5	2	0	0	0
(Italy) Claudio Corti	2010-2013, 2015	0	0	0	0	0	0	0	0	0	0	0
(France) Daniel Corvi	1978	0	0	0	0	0	0	0	0	0	0	0
(Uruguay) Horacio Costa	1961, 1963	0	0	0	0	0	0	0	0	0	0	0
(United Kingdom) Lee Costello	2008	0	0	0	0	0	0	0	0	0	0	0
(United Kingdom) Paul Cott	1972-1974	0	0	0	0	0	0	0	0	0	0	0
(United Kingdom) Vernon Cottle	1963-1964	0	0	0	0	0	0	0	0	0	0	0
(Switzerland) Philippe Coulon	1973-1980, 1982	0	0	0	0	0	0	0	0	0	0	0
(Republic of Ireland) Bob Coulter	1965, 1969-1970	0	0	0	0	0	0	0	0	0	0	0
(United Kingdom) Woolsey Coulter	1998	0	0	0	0	0	0	0	0	0	0	0
(United Kingdom) Peter Courtney	1971	0	0	0	0	0	0	0	0	0	0	0
(Republic of Ireland) Gary Cowan	1988-1989	0	0	0	0	0	0	0	0	0	0	0
(United Kingdom) Kevin Cowley	1972	0	0	0	0	0	0	0	0	0	0	0
(New Zealand) Simon Crafar	1993, 1998-1999	0	0	1	0	0	0	0	0	0	0	0
(Republic of Ireland) Cecil Crawford	1969	0	0	0	0	0	0	0	0	0	0	0
(Republic of Ireland) Dick Creith	1964-1965	0	0	1	0	0	0	0	0	0	0	0
(Belgium) Loris Cresson	2015	0	0	0	0	0	0	0	0	0	0	0
(Italy) Bruno Cretti	1970	0	0	0	0	0	0	0	0	0	0	0
(France) Thierry Crine	1989	0	0	0	0	0	0	0	0	0	0	0
(Spain) Fernando Cristobal	1998	0	0	0	0	0	0	0	0	0	0	0
(France) Daniel Crivello	1967, 1969	0	0	0	0	0	0	0	0	0	0	0
(Spain) Àlex Crivillé	1987-2001	2; 500cc - 1999; 125cc - 1989	0	15	0	0	0	0	5	0	0	0
(Australia) Max Croker	2014	0	0	0	0	0	0	0	0	0	0	0
(New Zealand) Graeme Crosby	1980-1982	0	0	0	0	0	0	0	0	0	0	0
(Spain) Adrian Cruces	2025-	0	0	0	0	0	0	0	0	0	0	0
(United Kingdom) Cal Crutchlow	2011-2023	0	3	0	0	0	0	0	0	0	0	0
(Australia) Alex Cudlin	2010-2011	0	0	0	0	0	0	0	0	0	0	0
(Australia) Damian Cudlin	2010-2013, 2015	0	0	0	0	0	0	0	0	0	0	0
(Spain) Francis Cufi	1968	0	0	0	0	0	0	0	0	0	0	0
(Italy) Emilio Cuppini	1988, 1990, 1993-1994	0	0	0	0	0	0	0	0	0	0	0
(United Kingdom) Jim Curry	1966-1967, 1969-1971	0	0	0	0	0	0	0	0	0	0	0
(Germany) Edmund Czihak	1974	0	0	1	0	0	0	0	0	0	0	0
