= 1965 Grand Prix motorcycle racing season =

Sports season

1965 F.I.M. Grand Prix motorcycle racing season

Seasons
- ← 1964 1966 →

The 1965 Grand Prix motorcycle racing season was the 17th F.I.M. Road Racing World Championship Grand Prix season. The season consisted of thirteen Grand Prix races in six classes: 500cc, 350cc, 250cc, 125cc, 50cc and Sidecars 500cc. It began on 21 March, with United States Grand Prix and ended with Japanese Grand Prix on October, 24.

== Season summary ==
Mike Hailwood easily claimed his fourth successive 500 class crown for MV Agusta, although he was beginning to show his disenchantment with the autocratic Count Agusta by accepting a 250 class ride from Honda. Newcomer Giacomo Agostini riding for MV Agusta would battle Honda's reigning champion Jim Redman for the 350 title. The outcome wouldn't be decided until the final race of the year in Japan, when Agostini's MV Agusta suffered a mechanical failure, handing the championship to Redman.

The Yamaha duo of Phil Read and Michelle Duff finished first and second in the 250 class, as Honda's Redman battled early season injuries. Hugh Anderson won six races to claim his second 125 championship for Suzuki while Honda's Ralph Bryans took the 50cc crown ahead of his Honda teammate Luigi Taveri.

== 1965 Grand Prix season calendar ==
Round	Date	Grand Prix	Circuit	50cc winner	125cc winner	250cc winner	350cc winner	500cc winner	Sidecars 500cc winner	Report
1	21 March	United States Grand Prix	Daytona Speedway	(West Germany) Ernst Degner	(New Zealand) Hugh Anderson	(United Kingdom) Phil Read		(United Kingdom) Mike Hailwood		Report
2	25 April	(West Germany) West German Grand Prix	Nürburgring Sudschleife	(Northern Ireland) Ralph Bryans	(New Zealand) Hugh Anderson	(United Kingdom) Phil Read	(Italy) Giacomo Agostini	(United Kingdom) Mike Hailwood	(Switzerland) (United Kingdom) Scheidegger / Robinson	Report
3	9 May	(Spain) Spanish Grand Prix	Montjuïc circuit	(New Zealand) Hugh Anderson	(New Zealand) Hugh Anderson	(United Kingdom) Phil Read			(Germany) Deubel / Hörner	Report
4	15 May	(France) French Grand Prix	Rouen-Les-Essarts	(Northern Ireland) Ralph Bryans	(New Zealand) Hugh Anderson	(United Kingdom) Phil Read			(Switzerland) Camathias / Ducret	Report
5	14 June	Isle of Man TT	Snaefell Mountain	(Switzerland) Luigi Taveri	(United Kingdom) Phil Read	(Rhodesia) Jim Redman	(Rhodesia) Jim Redman	(United Kingdom) Mike Hailwood	(Germany) Deubel / Hörner	Report
6	26 June	(Netherlands) Dutch TT	TT Circuit Assen	(Northern Ireland) Ralph Bryans	(Canada) Michelle Duff	(United Kingdom) Phil Read	(Rhodesia) Jim Redman	(United Kingdom) Mike Hailwood	(Switzerland) (United Kingdom) Scheidegger / Robinson	Report
7	4 July	(Belgium) Belgian Grand Prix	Spa-Francorchamps	(West Germany) Ernst Degner		(Rhodesia) Jim Redman		(United Kingdom) Mike Hailwood	(Switzerland) (United Kingdom) Scheidegger / Robinson	Report
8	18 July	(East Germany) East German Grand Prix	Sachsenring		(United Kingdom) Frank Perris	(Rhodesia) Jim Redman	(Rhodesia) Jim Redman	(United Kingdom) Mike Hailwood		Report
9	25 July	(Czechoslovakia) Czechoslovak Grand Prix	Masaryk Circuit		(United Kingdom) Frank Perris	(United Kingdom) Phil Read	(Rhodesia) Jim Redman	(United Kingdom) Mike Hailwood		Report
10	7 August	(Northern Ireland) Ulster Grand Prix	Dundrod Circuit		(West Germany) Ernst Degner	(United Kingdom) Phil Read	(Czechoslovakia) František Šťastný	(Northern Ireland) Dick Creith		Report
11	22 August	(Finland) Finnish Grand Prix	Imatra Circuit		(New Zealand) Hugh Anderson	(Canada) Michelle Duff	(Italy) Giacomo Agostini	(Italy) Giacomo Agostini		Report
12	5 September	(Italy) Nations Grand Prix	Monza		(New Zealand) Hugh Anderson	(Italy) Tarquinio Provini	(Italy) Giacomo Agostini	(United Kingdom) Mike Hailwood	(Switzerland) (United Kingdom) Scheidegger / Robinson	Report
13	24 October	(Japan) Japanese Grand Prix	Suzuka Circuit	(Switzerland) Luigi Taveri	(New Zealand) Hugh Anderson	(United Kingdom) Mike Hailwood	(United Kingdom) Mike Hailwood			Report

== Standings ==
=== Scoring system ===
Points were awarded to the top six finishers in each race. Only the best of six races were counted in 50cc, 350cc and 500cc championships, best of seven in 125cc and 250cc championships, while in the Sidecars, only the best of four races were counted.

Position	1st	2nd	3rd	4th	5th	6th
Points	8	6	4	3	2	1

==== 500cc final standings ====
Pos	Rider	Bike	USA (United States)	GER (Germany)	MAN (Isle of Man)	HOL (Netherlands)	BEL (Belgium)	DDR (East Germany)	TCH (Czechoslovakia)	ULS (Northern Ireland)	FIN (Finland)	NAC (Italy)	Pts
1	(United Kingdom) Mike Hailwood	MV Agusta	1	1	1	1	1	1	1			1	**48** (64)
2	(Italy) Giacomo Agostini	MV Agusta		2	Ret	2	2	2	2		1	2	**38** (44)
3	(South Africa) Paddy Driver	Matchless	Ret	Ret	Ret	3	4	3	4	2	2		**26**
4	(United Kingdom) Fred Stevens	Matchless					5	5	5	5	3	4	**15**
5	(Australia) Jack Ahearn	Norton		Ret	9	5	9	4	3				**9**
6	(Northern Ireland) Dick Creith	Norton								1			**8**
7	(Australia) Jack Findlay	Matchless		4	10	11	12	11	9	4	5	8	**8**
8	(United Kingdom) Joe Dunphy	Norton			2			Ret		Ret			**6**
9	(United States) Buddy Parriott	Norton	2										**6**
10	(Czechoslovakia) František Šťastný	Jawa							6		8	3	**5**
11	(United Kingdom) Chris Conn	Norton			Ret	7	7			3			**4**
12	(United Kingdom) Derek Minter	Norton			Ret	Ret	3						**4**
13	(Canada) Roger Beaumont	Norton	3										**4**
=	(Canada) Michelle Duff	Matchless			3								**4**
=	(Germany) Walter Scheimann	Norton		3									**4**
16	(South Africa) Ian Burne	Norton		Ret	4	Ret	8	6	10		Ret	10	**4**
17	(United Kingdom) John Cooper	RD Norton			Ret	4	Ret			Ret			**3**
18	(Finland) Jouko Ryhänen	Matchless						Ret			4		**3**
19	(Canada) Kenneth King	Norton	4										**3**
20	(Austria) Edy Lenz	Norton		5	Ret	Ret		9	Ret			7	**2**
21	(Wales) Selwyn Griffiths	Matchless			5					9			**2**
22	(United States) Ed LaBelle	Norton	5										**2**
=	(Italy) Giuseppe Mandolini	Moto Guzzi										5	**2**
24	(Switzerland) Gyula Marsovszky	Matchless		Ret	8	Ret	6				Ret	6	**2**
25	(United Kingdom) Lewis Young	Matchless		7		14	Ret	8	Ret		6		**1**
26	(United Kingdom) Dan Shorey	Norton		Ret	18	6	10	10	7	10		12	**1**
27	(Northern Ireland) Billy McCosh	Matchless			6					8			**1**
28	(United Kingdom) Billie Nelson	Norton		6	12	Ret							**1**
29	(United Kingdom) Robin Fitton	Norton				Ret				6			**1**
30	(Canada) David Lloyd	Norton	6										**1**
31	(Australia) Eric Hinton	Norton			Ret			Ret	Ret		7		**0**
32	(Czechoslovakia) Gustav Havel	Jawa							Ret	7	Ret		**0**
=	(Australia) Malcolm Stanton	Norton			Ret			7		Ret			**0**
34	(United Kingdom) Alan Dugalde	Norton			7								**0**
=	(United States) Fred Simone	BMW	7										**0**
36	(Austria) Rudi Thalhammer	Norton				9			8			9	**0**
37	(Germany) Karl Hoppe	Matchless				8							**0**
=	(United States) Al Johnson	BMW	8										**0**
=	(Germany) Hans-Jürgen Melcher	Norton		8									**0**
40	(United Kingdom) Roy Robinson	Norton						14	11		9		**0**
41	(Germany) Hans-Otto Butenuth	BMW		9	16								**0**
42	(United States) Ray Dey	Norton	9										**0**
43	(United Kingdom) Syd Mizen	Matchless			Ret	10	Ret						**0**
44	(United States) Wester Cooley	Norton	10										**0**
=	(Finland) Hannu Kuparinen	Matchless									10		**0**
=	(Germany) Hans Schmidt	BMW		10									**0**
47	(United Kingdom) Griff Jenkins	Lancefield Norton			Ret					Ret		11	**0**
48	(United Kingdom) Dave Croxford	Matchless			11								**0**
=	(United States) Carl Eshoo	Triumph	11										**0**
=	(Germany) Manfred Gäckle	Norton		11									**0**
=	(Finland) Pentti Lehtelä	Norton									11		**0**
=	(Northern Ireland) Ian McGregor	Norton								11			**0**
53	(United Kingdom) Derek Lee	Matchless		Ret	15			16	12		13		**0**
54	(France) Philippe Canoui	Norton / Matchless						15			12	Ret	**0**
55	(Sweden) Bo Granath	Matchless			Ret		Ret	12			Ret		**0**
56	(United Kingdom) Stuart Graham	Matchless			Ret	12	Ret						**0**
57	(Germany) Bernhard Bockelmann	Norton		12									**0**
=	(United States) Bruce Carter	BSA	12										**0**
=	(United Kingdom) Ron Wilson	Norton								12			**0**
60	(Switzerland) Ernst Weiss	Norton		14				Ret	13				**0**
61	(United Kingdom) Roy Ingram	Norton			Ret	13							**0**
=	(Rhodesia) Gordon Keith	Norton			13					Ret			**0**
63	(Sweden) Billy Andersson	AJS						13					**0**
=	(Italy) Giuseppe Dardanello	Norton										13	**0**
=	(United States) Stan Friduss	Norton	13										**0**
=	(Northern Ireland) Jimmy Jones	Norton								13			**0**
=	(Germany) Siegfried Springenberg	Horex		13									**0**
68	(Northern Ireland) Davy Crawford	Norton								14			**0**
=	(Poland) Jan Hennek	Norton							14				**0**
=	(United Kingdom) Tony Wilmott	Norton			14								**0**
71	(United Kingdom) Maurice Hawtorne	Norton		Ret				Ret	15				**0**
72	(Hungary) György Kurucz	Norton						15	Ret				**0**
=	(United Kingdom) Alf Shaw	Norton			Ret					15			**0**
74	(Germany) Hans Föhr	Matchless		15									**0**
=	(United Kingdom) John Mawby	Norton				15							**0**
76	(Australia) Jack Saunders	Matchless			31					16			**0**
77	(Northern Ireland) John Brown	Norton								17			**0**
=	(United Kingdom) Carl Ward	Norton			17								**0**
79	(United Kingdom) John Simmonds	Norton			19								**0**
80	(New Zealand) Robert Haldane	Matchless			20					Ret			**0**
81	(United Kingdom) Ron Chandler	Matchless			21								**0**
82	(Australia) Peter Richards	Norton			22								**0**
83	(United Kingdom) Brian Proctor	Norton			23								**0**
84	(Australia) Tom Gill	Matchless			24								**0**
85	(United States) Marvin Wright	Norton			25								**0**
86	(United Kingdom) Bob Ritchie	Norton			26					Ret			**0**
87	(United Kingdom) John Rudge	Triton			27								**0**
88	(United Kingdom) Colin Cross	Norton			28								**0**
89	(South Africa) Abbey de Kock	Norton		Ret	29			Ret	Ret				**0**
90	(United Kingdom) Bill Hawthorne	BSA-Norton			30								**0**
-	(United Kingdom) John Denty	Norton			Ret			Ret		Ret			**0**
-	(Republic of Ireland) John Somers	Norton				Ret		Ret			Ret		**0**
-	(Germany) Hartmut Allner	BMW		Ret					Ret				**0**
-	(Sweden) Bo Brolin	Matchless						Ret			Ret		**0**
-	(Sweden) Agne Carlsson	Matchless						Ret			Ret		**0**
-	(New Zealand) Graham Dickson	Norton		Ret				Ret					**0**
-	(United Kingdom) Bill Ivy	Matchless			Ret	Ret							**0**
-	(Estonian Soviet Socialist Republic) Endel Kiisa	Vostok		Ret					Ret				**0**
-	(Australia) Ron Robinson	Norton						Ret	Ret				**0**
-	(United Kingdom) Bill Smith	Matchless / DKW			Ret							Ret	**0**
-	(United Kingdom) Dennis Ainsworth	Norton				Ret							**0**
-	(United Kingdom) Derek Blackmore	Norton			Ret								**0**
-	(United States) Stan Brassey	Norton			Ret								**0**
-	(United Kingdom) Rex Butcher	Norton			Ret								**0**
-	(Germany) Heiner Butz	Norton		Ret									**0**
-	(United Kingdom) Louis Carr	Norton			Ret								**0**
-	(Italy) Antonio de Simone	Norton										Ret	**0**
-	(Northern Ireland) Arnold Dobbs	Matchless								Ret			**0**
-	(United Kingdom) Vincent Duckett	Matchless			Ret								**0**
-	(South Africa) Bobby Duncan	Triumph			Ret								**0**
-	(United States) Dean Dyess	Ducati	Ret										**0**
-	(Germany) Klaus Enders	Norton		Ret									**0**
-	(Germany) Karl-Heinz Ewing	Norton		Ret									**0**
-	(Italy) Franco Farne	Ducati	Ret										**0**
-	(South Africa) Ray Flack	Norton			Ret								**0**
-	(Canada) Fred Gailey	Norton	Ret										**0**
-	(South Africa) Andreas Georgeades	Matchless			Ret								**0**
-	(United States) Peter Gould	Ducati	Ret										**0**
-	(United Kingdom) Jack Gow	Norton			Ret								**0**
-	(Sweden) Sven-Olov Gunnarson	Norton						Ret					**0**
-	(Germany) Albert Häring	Norton		Ret									**0**
-	(Canada) Oliver Howe	Norton		Ret									**0**
-	(United Kingdom) John Hudson	Norton			Ret								**0**
-	(United Kingdom) Alan Hunter	Norton			Ret								**0**
-	(Canada) Dave Jackson	Matchless	Ret										**0**
-	(Germany) Lothar John	Norton		Ret									**0**
-	(Australia) David Johnson	Norton			Ret								**0**
-	(United Kingdom) Derek Jones	BSA			Ret								**0**
-	(United States) Wilber Lawson	Triumph	Ret										**0**
-	(Canada) Ivor Lloyd	Norton	Ret										**0**
-	(United States) Gerald MacDonald	Paton	Ret										**0**
-	(Italy) Emanuele Maugliani	Norton										Ret	**0**
-	(Canada) Stuart Morin	Matchless	Ret										**0**
-	(United Kingdom) Albert Moule	Norton			Ret								**0**
-	(Netherlands) Bert Oosterhuis	Norton		Ret									**0**
-	(Italy) Gianni Perrone	Bianchi										Ret	**0**
-	(United Kingdom) John Pinckney	Norton		Ret									**0**
-	(United Kingdom) Laurence Povey	Norton			Ret								**0**
-	(Northern Ireland) Robert Reid	Norton								Ret			**0**
-	(New Zealand) Bryan Scobie	Norton						Ret					**0**
-	(Germany) Horst Seidl	Norton		Ret									**0**
-	(Soviet Union) Nikolai Sevostyanov	Vostok							Ret				**0**
-	(South Africa) John Smith	Norton					Ret						**0**
-	(South Africa) Hans Sommerhalder	Matchless			Ret								**0**
-	(Northern Ireland) Brian Taggart	Norton								Ret			**0**
-	(Germany) Rolf Thiemig	Norton		Ret									**0**
-	(Italy) Franco Trabalzini	Gilera										Ret	**0**
-	(United Kingdom) William Walton	Norton			Ret								**0**
-	(United Kingdom) Monty Ward	Norton			Ret								**0**
-	(United Kingdom) Dave Williams	MW Norton			Ret								**0**
-	(United States) Anthony Woodman	Matchless		Ret									**0**
-	(United Kingdom) Derek Woodman	Matchless			Ret								**0**
-	(Italy) Benedetto Zambotti	Norton										Ret	**0**
-	(Germany) Manfred Zeller	Matchless		Ret									**0**
Pos	Rider	Bike	USA (United States)	GER (Germany)	MAN (United Kingdom)	HOL (Netherlands)	BEL (Belgium)	DDR (East Germany)	TCH (Czechoslovakia)	ULS (Ulster)	FIN (Finland)	NAC (Italy)	Pts

Colour	Result
Gold	Winner
Silver	Second place
Bronze	Third place
Green	Points classification
Blue	Non-points classification
Blue	Non-classified finish (NC)
Purple	Retired, not classified (Ret)
Red	Did not qualify (DNQ)
Red	Did not pre-qualify (DNPQ)
Black	Disqualified (DSQ)
White	Did not start (DNS)
White	Withdrew (WD)
White	Race cancelled (C)
Blank	Did not practice (DNP)
Blank	Did not arrive (DNA)
Blank	Excluded (EX)

**Bold** – Pole
Italics – Fastest Lap

=== 350cc Standings ===
Place	Rider	Number	Country	Machine	Points	Wins
1	(Rhodesia) Jim Redman		Rhodesia	Honda	38	4
2	(Italy) Giacomo Agostini		Italy	MV Agusta	32	3
3	(United Kingdom) Mike Hailwood		United Kingdom	MV Agusta	20	1
4	(Rhodesia) Bruce Beale		Rhodesia	Honda	15	0
5	(Czechoslovakia) František Šťastný		Czechoslovakia	Jawa	14	1
6	(United Kingdom) Derek Woodman		United Kingdom	MZ	14	0
7	(Czechoslovakia) Gustav Havel		Czechoslovakia	Jawa	12	0
8	(Italy) Renzo Pasolini		Italy	Aermacchi	9	0
9	(United Kingdom) Phil Read		United Kingdom	Yamaha	6	0
=	(Italy) Silvio Grassetti		Italy	Benelli	6	0
11	(Czechoslovakia) František Boček		Czechoslovakia	Jawa	6	0
12	(Italy) Gilberto Milani		Italy	Aermacchi	6	0
13	(Soviet Union) Nicolaï Sevostianov		Soviet Union	Vostok	4	0
=	(Italy) Tarquinio Provini		Italy	Benelli	4	0
=	(Japan) Isamu Kasuya		Japan	Honda	4	0
16	(United Kingdom) Chris Conn		United Kingdom	Norton	3	0
=	(Sweden) Agne Carlsson		Sweden	AJS	3	0
=	(Japan) Isao Yamashita		Japan	Honda	3	0
19	(United Kingdom) Griff Jenkins		United Kingdom	Norton	3	0
=	(United Kingdom) John Cooper		United Kingdom	Norton	3	0
21	(Soviet Union) Endel Kiisa		Soviet Union	CKEB	2	0
=	(United Kingdom) Lewis Young		United Kingdom	AJS	2	0
23	(United Kingdom) Dan Shorey		United Kingdom	Norton	2	0
24	(South Africa) Paddy Driver		South Africa	AJS	1	0
=	(Australia) Eric Hinton		Australia	Norton	1	0
=	(United Kingdom) Bill Smith		United Kingdom	Norton	1	0

=== 250cc Standings ===
Place	Rider	Number	Country	Machine	Points	Wins
1	(United Kingdom) Phil Read		United Kingdom	Yamaha	56	7
2	(Canada) Michelle Duff		Canada	Yamaha	42	1
3	(Rhodesia) Jim Redman		Rhodesia	Honda	34	3
4	(East Germany) Heinz Rosner		East Germany	MZ	18	0
5	(United Kingdom) Derek Woodman		United Kingdom	MZ	15	0
6	(Rhodesia) Bruce Beale		Rhodesia	Honda	14	0
7	(Italy) Tarquinio Provini		Italy	Benelli	11	1
8	(Spain) Ramón Torras		Spain	Bultaco	10	0
9	(United Kingdom) Frank Perris		United Kingdom	Suzuki	9	0
10	(United Kingdom) Mike Hailwood		United Kingdom	Honda	8	1
11	(Czechoslovakia) František Šťastný		Czechoslovakia	ČZ	8	0
12	(Japan) Isamu Kasuya		Japan	Honda	6	0
13	(United Kingdom) Ralph Bryans		United Kingdom	Honda	6	0
14	(Japan) Yoshimi Katayama		Japan	Suzuki	6	0
15	(Italy) Giuseppe Visenzi		Italy	Aermacchi	5	0
16	(Italy) Silvio Grassetti		Italy	Morini	4	0
=	(Australia) Barry Smith		Australia	Bultaco	4	0
=	(Italy) Remo Venturi		Italy	Benelli	4	0
=	(United Kingdom) Bill Ivy		United Kingdom	Yamaha	4	0
20	(New Zealand) Ginger Molloy		New Zealand	Bultaco	4	0
21	(France) Jean-Claude Guénard		France	Bultaco	3	0
=	(Japan) Gosuke Yamashita		Japan	Honda	3	0
23	(West Germany) Günter Beer		West Germany	Honda	3	0
24	(Spain) José Busquets		Spain	Montesa	2	0
=	(Australia) Kevin Cass		Australia	Cotton	2	0
=	(United Kingdom) Rex Avery		United Kingdom	Bultaco	2	0
=	(Japan) Hiroshi Hasegawa		Japan	Yamaha	2	0
28	(United States) John Buckner		United States	Yamaha	1	0
=	(Italy) Gilberto Milani		Italy	Aermacchi	1	0
=	(Italy) Alberto Pagani		Italy	Aermacchi	1	0
=	(France) Alain Barbaroux		France	Aermacchi	5	0
=	(United Kingdom) Dave Williams		United Kingdom	FB-Mondial	1	0
=	(United Kingdom) Bob Coulter		United Kingdom	Bultaco	1	0

=== 125cc ===
==== Riders' standings ====
Pos.	Rider	Bike	USA (United States)	FRG (West Germany)	ESP (Spain)	FRA (France)	MAN (Isle of Man)	NED (Netherlands)	GDR (East Germany)	TCH (Czechoslovakia)	ULS (Northern Ireland)	FIN (Finland)	NAT (Italy)	JPN (Japan)	Pts
1	(New Zealand) Hugh Anderson	Suzuki	1**^{F}**	1**^{F}**	1	1**^{F}**	5**^{F}**	3**^{F}**		NC**^{F}**		1**^{F}**	1**^{F}**	1	56 (62)
2	(United Kingdom) Frank Perris	Suzuki	3	2	2**^{F}**	3			1**^{F}**	1		2	2		44 (48)
3	(United Kingdom) Derek Woodman	MZ		5	3	4	4		3	2	3		3		28 (30)
4	(West Germany) Ernst Degner	Suzuki	2	4		2					1**^{F}**				23
5	(Switzerland) Luigi Taveri	Honda					2	5						2**^{F}**	14
6	(Canada) Mike Duff	Yamaha					3	1							12
7	(East Germany) Klaus Enderlein	MZ			5						2		4		11
8	(United Kingdom) Ralph Bryans	Honda					6				4	4		3	11
9	(East Germany) Joachim Leitert	MZ							4	4		3			10
10	(United Kingdom) Phil Read	Yamaha					1								8
11	(Japan) Yoshimi Katayama	Suzuki						2							6
11	(East Germany) Dieter Krumpholz	MZ							2						6
13	(United Kingdom) Bill Ivy	Yamaha						4						4	6
14	(Rhodesia) Bruce Beale	Honda				5			5		5				6
15	(Spain) Ramón Torras	Bultaco		3											4
15	(East Germany) Heinz Rosner	MZ								3					4
17	(East Germany) Roland Rentzsch	MZ								5		5			4
18	(United States) Rick Schell	Honda	4												3
18	(Italy) Bruno Spaggiari	Ducati			4										3
20	(Italy) Giuseppe Visenzi	Honda				6		6				6			3
21	(United States) Jeff Tate (Note: Harry Webster raced under the pseudonym Jeff Tate.)	Honda	5												2
21	(West Germany) Hans-Georg Anscheidt	MZ-Kreidler											5		2
21	(Japan) Yasuhara Yuzawa	Honda												5	2
24	(United States) Bob Gehring	Bultaco	6												1
24	(West Germany) Walter Scheimann	Honda		6											1
24	(Switzerland) Arthur Fegbli	Honda			6										1
24	(East Germany) Jürgen Lenk	MZ							6						1
24	(Czechoslovakia) František Boček	ČZ								6					1
24	(United Kingdom) Tommy Robb	Bultaco									6				1
24	(New Zealand) Ginger Molloy	Bultaco											6		1
24	(Japan) Hiroki Matsushima	Yamaha												6	1
Pos.	Rider	Bike	USA (United States)	FRG (West Germany)	ESP (Spain)	FRA (France)	MAN (Isle of Man)	NED (Netherlands)	GDR (East Germany)	TCH (Czechoslovakia)	ULS (Northern Ireland)	FIN (Finland)	NAT (Italy)	JPN (Japan)	Pts

Race key
Colour	Result
Gold	Winner
Silver	2nd place
Bronze	3rd place
Green	Points finish
Blue	Non-points finish
Blue	Non-classified finish (NC)
Purple	Retired (Ret)
Red	Did not qualify (DNQ)
Black	Disqualified (DSQ)
White	Did not start (DNS)
White	Withdrew (WD)
White	Race cancelled (C)
Blank	Did not practice (DNP)
Blank	Excluded (EX)
Blank	Did not arrive (DNA)
Blank	Did not enter (empty cell)
Annotation	Meaning
P	Pole position
F	Fastest lap
Rider key
Colour	Meaning
Light blue	Rookie rider

==== Constructors' standings ====
Each constructor is awarded the same number of points as their best placed rider in each race.

Pos.	Constructor	USA (United States)	FRG (West Germany)	ESP (Spain)	FRA (France)	MAN (Isle of Man)	NED (Netherlands)	GDR (East Germany)	TCH (Czechoslovakia)	ULS (Northern Ireland)	FIN (Finland)	NAT (Italy)	JPN (Japan)	Pts
1	(Japan) Suzuki	1	1	1	1	5	2	1	1	1	1	1	1	56 (88)
2	(East Germany) MZ		5	3	4	4		2	2	2	3	3		33 (38)
3	(Japan) Honda	4	6	6	5	2	5	5		4	4		2	25 (29)
4	(Japan) Yamaha					1	1						4	19
5	(Spain) Bultaco	6	3							6		6		7
6	(Italy) Ducati			4										3
7	(West Germany) MZ-Kreidler											5		2
8	(Czechoslovakia) ČZ								6					1
Pos.	Constructor	USA (United States)	FRG (West Germany)	ESP (Spain)	FRA (France)	MAN (Isle of Man)	NED (Netherlands)	GDR (East Germany)	TCH (Czechoslovakia)	ULS (Northern Ireland)	FIN (Finland)	NAT (Italy)	JPN (Japan)	Pts

=== 50cc Standings ===
Place	Rider	Number	Country	Machine	Points	Wins
1	(United Kingdom) Ralph Bryans		United Kingdom	Honda	36	3
2	(Switzerland) Luigi Taveri		Switzerland	Honda	32	2
3	(New Zealand) Hugh Anderson		New Zealand	Suzuki	32	1
4	(Germany) Ernst Degner		West Germany	Suzuki	26	2
5	(Japan) Mitsuo Itoh		Japan	Suzuki	16	0
6	(Japan) Michio Ichino		Japan	Suzuki	6	0
7	(West Germany) Hans-Georg Anscheidt		West Germany	Kreidler	6	0
8	(Spain) José Busquets		Spain	Derbi	4	0
9	(France) Jacques Roca		France	Derbi	4	0
10	(Japan) Haruo Koshino		Japan	Suzuki	3	0
=	(United Kingdom) Charlie Mates		United Kingdom	Honda	3	0
12	(Spain) Angel Nieto		Spain	Derbi	2	0
=	(United Kingdom) Ian Plumridge		United Kingdom	Derbi	2	0
14	(Netherlands) Cees van Dongen		Netherlands	Kreidler	2	0
15	(Uruguay) Gastón Biscia		Uruguay	Suzuki	1	0
=	(Australia) Barry Smith		Australia	Derbi	1	0
=	(United Kingdom) Leslie Griffiths		United Kingdom	Honda	1	0
=	(Japan) Akira Itoh		Japan	Honda	1	0
