= 1964 Grand Prix motorcycle racing season =

Sports season

1964 F.I.M. Grand Prix motorcycle racing season

Seasons
- ← 1963 1965 →

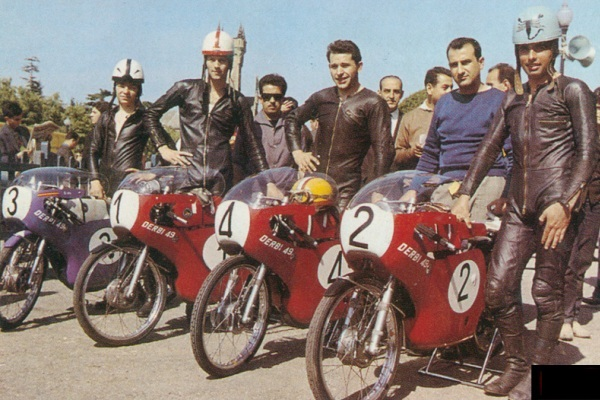

The 1964 Grand Prix motorcycle racing season was the 16th F.I.M. Road Racing World Championship Grand Prix season. The season consisted of twelve Grand Prix races in six classes: 500cc, 350cc, 250cc, 125cc, 50cc and Sidecars 500cc. It began on 2 February, with United States Grand Prix and ended with Japanese Grand Prix on 1 November.

== Season summary ==
Mike Hailwood sprinted to another 500 class win for MV Agusta, winning the first six races of the year and seven races overall. Honda's Jim Redman won all eight 350 class races against only token factory opposition.

The 250 class proved to be more difficult as Yamaha's Phil Read battled Redman all season long, with Read finally coming out on top, winning five races to Redman's three. Luigi Taveri won the 125 title for Honda while Suzuki's Hugh Anderson fought a season-long battle with Honda's Ralph Bryans to retain his 50cc crown.

== 1964 Grand Prix season calendar ==
Round	Date	Grand Prix	Circuit	50cc winner	125cc winner	250cc winner	350cc winner	500cc winner	Sidecars 500cc winner	Report
1	2 February	United States Grand Prix	Daytona Speedway	(New Zealand) Hugh Anderson	(New Zealand) Hugh Anderson	(United Kingdom) Alan Shepherd		(United Kingdom) Mike Hailwood		Report
2	10 May	(Spain) Spanish Grand Prix	Montjuïc Circuit	(West Germany) Hans-Georg Anscheidt	(Switzerland) Luigi Taveri	(Italy) Tarquinio Provini			(Switzerland) (West Germany) Camathias / Föll	Report
3	17 May	(France) French Grand Prix	Circuit de Charade	(New Zealand) Hugh Anderson	(Switzerland) Luigi Taveri	(United Kingdom) Phil Read			(Switzerland) (United Kingdom) Scheidegger / Robinson	Report
4	12 June	Isle of Man TT	Snaefell Mountain	(New Zealand) Hugh Anderson	(Switzerland) Luigi Taveri	(Rhodesia) Jim Redman	(Rhodesia) Jim Redman	(United Kingdom) Mike Hailwood	(West Germany) Deubel / Hörner	Report
5	27 June	(Netherlands) Dutch TT	TT Circuit Assen	(Northern Ireland) Ralph Bryans	(Rhodesia) Jim Redman	(Rhodesia) Jim Redman	(Rhodesia) Jim Redman	(United Kingdom) Mike Hailwood	(United Kingdom) Seeley / Rawling	Report
6	5 July	(Belgium) Belgian Grand Prix	Spa-Francorchamps	(Northern Ireland) Ralph Bryans		(Canada) Mike Duff		(United Kingdom) Mike Hailwood	(West Germany) Deubel / Hörner	Report
7	19 July	(West Germany) West German Grand Prix	Solitude	(Northern Ireland) Ralph Bryans	(Rhodesia) Jim Redman	(United Kingdom) Phil Read	(Rhodesia) Jim Redman	(United Kingdom) Mike Hailwood	(Switzerland) (United Kingdom) Scheidegger / Robinson	Report
8	26 July	(East Germany) East German Grand Prix	Sachsenring		(New Zealand) Hugh Anderson	(United Kingdom) Phil Read	(Rhodesia) Jim Redman	(United Kingdom) Mike Hailwood		Report
9	8 August	(Northern Ireland) Ulster Grand Prix	Dundrod Circuit		(New Zealand) Hugh Anderson	(United Kingdom) Phil Read	(Rhodesia) Jim Redman	(United Kingdom) Phil Read		Report
10	30 August	(Finland) Finnish Grand Prix	Imatra Circuit	(New Zealand) Hugh Anderson	(Switzerland) Luigi Taveri		(Rhodesia) Jim Redman	(Australia) Jack Ahearn		Report
11	13 September	(Italy) Nations Grand Prix	Monza		(Switzerland) Luigi Taveri	(United Kingdom) Phil Read	(Rhodesia) Jim Redman	(United Kingdom) Mike Hailwood		Report
12	1 November	(Japan) Japanese Grand Prix	Suzuka Circuit	(Northern Ireland) Ralph Bryans †	(West Germany) Ernst Degner	(Rhodesia) Jim Redman	(Rhodesia) Jim Redman			Report

† Non-championship race.

== Standings ==
=== Scoring system ===
Points were awarded to the top six finishers in each race. Only the best of five races were counted in 50cc, 350cc and 500cc championships, best of six in 125cc and 250cc championships, while in the Sidecars, only the best of four races were counted.

Position	1st	2nd	3rd	4th	5th	6th
Points	8	6	4	3	2	1

==== 500cc final standings ====
Pos	Rider	Machine	USA (United States)	MAN (Isle of Man)	HOL (Netherlands)	BEL (Belgium)	GER (Germany)	DDR (East Germany)	ULS (Northern Ireland)	FIN (Finland)	NAC (Italy)	Pts
1	(United Kingdom) Mike Hailwood	MV Agusta	1	1	1	1	1	1			1	**40** (56)
2	(Australia) Jack Ahearn	Norton		14	4	4	2	6	3	1	3	**25** (29)
3	(United Kingdom) Phil Read	Matchless / Norton	2	Ret	6	2	3	Ret	1			**25**
4	(Canada) Mike Duff	Norton / Matchless	4	Ret	Ret	Ret	Ret	2	Ret	2	4	**18**
5	(South Africa) Paddy Driver	Matchless	5	26	3	3	Ret	3		5	Ret	**16**
6	(United Kingdom) Fred Stevens	Matchless / Norton		3	5	7	6	Ret	6	Ret	7	8
7	(Switzerland) Gyula Marsovszky	Matchless		Ret		Ret	4			3	Ret	**7**
8	(Italy) Remo Venturi	Bianchi			2		DNS				10	**6**
9	(Argentina) Benedicto Caldarella	Gilera	Ret		Ret	Ret					2	**6**
10	(United Kingdom) Derek Minter	Norton		2	Ret							**6**
11	(Northern Ireland) Dick Creith	Norton							2			**6**
12	(Soviet Union) Nikolai Sevostianov	CKEB						4		4		**6**
13	(United Kingdom) Derek Woodman	Matchless		4	Ret	6	Ret	5	Ret	7	Ret	**6**
14	(United Kingdom) John Hartle	Norton	3									**4**
15	(Australia) Jack Findlay	Matchless	Ret	13	Ret	5	Ret	8	Ret	9	5	**4**
16	(United Kingdom) Robin Fitton	Norton							4			**3**
17	(New Zealand) Morry Low	Norton			Ret	Ret	5					**2**
18	(United Kingdom) Chris Conn	Norton		Ret					5			**2**
19	(United Kingdom) Griff Jenkins	Norton		5								**2**
20	(United Kingdom) Lewis Young	Matchless			14	Ret	9	16		6		**1**
21	(Germany) Walter Scheimann	Norton		25	9	Ret	Ret				6	**1**
22	(Northern Ireland) Billy McCosh	Matchless		6					9			**1**
23	(United States) Buddy Parriott	Norton	6									**1**
24	(Czech Republic) Gustav Havel	Jawa			Ret		Ret	7	Ret		Ret	**0**
25	(Italy) Alberto Pagani	Bianchi			7		DNS				Ret	**0**
26	(United Kingdom) Joe Dunphy	Norton		Ret					7			**0**
27	(Germany) Klaus Enders	Norton					7					**0**
=	(United States) George Rockett	BMW	7									**0**
=	(United Kingdom) Brian Setchell	Norton		7								**0**
30	(United Kingdom) Dan Shorey	Norton		17	8	9	Ret	10	10			**0**
31	(Australia) Dennis Fry	Norton		35	Ret	Ret	8	15				**0**
32	(United Kingdom) Vernon Cottle	Norton			15	8	Ret	Ret				**0**
33	(United Kingdom) Syd Mizen	Dunstall Norton		Ret					8			**0**
34	(United States) Ed LaBelle	Norton	8									**0**
=	(New Zealand) Ginger Molloy	Norton									8	**0**
=	(Finland) Jouko Ryhänen	Matchless								8		**0**
=	(United Kingdom) Carl Ward	Norton		8								**0**
38	(Sweden) Sven-Olaf Gunnarsson	Norton		Ret	Ret		Ret	9		Ret		**0**
39	(United Kingdom) John Cooper	Norton		9					Ret			**0**
40	(United States) Brian Davis	AJS	9									**0**
=	(Italy) Vasco Loro	Norton									9	**0**
42	(South Africa) Andreas Georgeades	Matchless		27			10					**0**
43	(United Kingdom) Roy Robinson	Norton				10	Ret	Ret				0
44	(Australia) Thomas Gill	Matchless							Ret	10		0
=	(Germany) Karl Recktenwald	Norton			10		Ret					0
46	(United Kingdom) Charles Williams	Triumph	10									0
=	(United Kingdom) Derek Lee	Matchless		10								0
48	(United Kingdom) Maurice Hawthorne	Norton					12	Ret			11	0
49	(Canada) Keith King	Norton		30			11	14				0
50	(Belgium) Raymond Bogaerdt	Norton				11	Ret					0
=	(Sweden) Bror-Erland Carlsson	Matchless						11		Ret		0
52	(Czechoslovakia) František Šťastný	Jawa			11		DNQ					0
53	(United Kingdom) Pete Bettison	Norton		11								0
=	(Finland) Hannu Kuparinen	Matchless								11		0
=	(United States) Paul Whitaker	Norton	11									0
56	(Netherlands) Aart Van Kooij	Norton			13	12	DNS	Ret				**0**
57	(United Kingdom) Trevor Ritchie	Norton		20					12			**0**
58	(Germany) Ernst Hiller	Norton			12		Ret					**0**
=	(Estonian Soviet Socialist Republic) Endel Kiisa	CKEB						12		Ret		**0**
60	(Italy) Giuseppe Dardanello	Norton									12	**0**
=	(Rhodesia) Alan Harris	Matchless		12								**0**
=	(United States) Joe Tillman	BSA	12									**0**
=	(Finland) Antero Ventoniemi	Norton								12		**0**
64	(Sweden) Bo Granath	Matchless					15	13	14	Ret		**0**
65	(South Africa) Ian Burne	Norton		22		13		Ret	Ret			**0**
66	(Germany) Hans-Otto Butenuth	BMW		34			13					**0**
67	(Northern Ireland) Jimmy Jones	Norton							13			**0**
=	(Italy) Emanuele Maugliani	Gilera									13	**0**
69	(Germany) Hartmut Allner	BMW					14					**0**
=	(Italy) Benedetto Zambotti	Norton									14	**0**
71	(Italy) Pietro Mencaglia	Gilera									15	**0**
=	(United Kingdom) Alf Shaw	Norton							15			**0**
=	(United Kingdom) John Simmonds	Norton		15								**0**
74	(Germany) Hans-Jürgen Melcher	Norton					16					**0**
=	(Netherlands) Joop Vogelzang	Norton			16							**0**
=	(United Kingdom) Don Watson	Norton		16								**0**
77	(Republic of Ireland) John Somers	Norton				Ret		17				**0**
78	(United Kingdom) Alan Dugalde	Matchless		18								**0**
79	(United Kingdom) Stuart Graham	Matchless		19								**0**
80	(United Kingdom) Billie Nelson	Norton		21								**0**
81	(United Kingdom) Vincent Duckett	Matchless		23								**0**
82	(United Kingdom) Jim Evans	Norton		24								**0**
83	(United Kingdom) Brian Walmsley	Matchless		28								**0**
84	(United Kingdom) Don Ellis	Matchless		29								**0**
85	(United Kingdom) Laurence Povey	Norton		31								**0**
86	(United Kingdom) Jimmy Morton	Matchless		32								**0**
87	(United Kingdom) Dave Duncan	Matchless		33								**0**
88	(United Kingdom) Frank Norris	F.A.N.		36								**0**
89	(United Kingdom) Roly Capner	Matchless		37								**0**
-	(United Kingdom) Alan Hunter	Matchless		Ret	Ret	Ret						**0**
-	(Switzerland) Ernst Weiss	Norton					Ret	Ret	Ret			**0**
-	(Finland) Pentti Lehtelä	Norton					DNQ	Ret		Ret		**0**
-	(Germany) Heiner Butz	Norton				Ret	Ret					**0**
-	(Sweden) Agne Carlsson	Matchless						Ret		Ret		**0**
-	(United Kingdom) Roy Ingram	Norton		Ret	Ret							**0**
-	(United Kingdom) Stephen Murray	Matchless		Ret					Ret			**0**
-	(United Kingdom) Bill Roberton	Norton		Ret					Ret			**0**
-	(Australia) Ron Robinson	Norton					Ret	Ret				**0**
-	(United States) William Sharp	BSA		Ret				Ret				**0**
-	(Italy) Silvio Grassetti	Bianchi					DNS				Ret	**0**
-	(Austria) Edy Lenz	Norton					DNQ	Ret				**0**
-	(Austria) Rudolf Bergsleithner	Norton					Ret					**0**
-	(United States) Peter Bosarge	Honda	Ret									**0**
-	(United Kingdom) Geoff Bradburn	Norton		Ret								**0**
-	(United States) Stan Brassley	Norton		Ret								**0**
-	(Northern Ireland) John Brown	Norton							Ret			**0**
-	(United Kingdom) Monty Buxton	Norton		Ret								**0**
-	(Italy) Paolo Campanelli	Matchless									Ret	**0**
-	(France) Philippe Canoui	Norton									Ret	**0**
-	(United Kingdom) Louis Carr	Matchless		Ret								**0**
-	(United States) Wester Cooley	Norton	Ret									**0**
-	(Northern Ireland) James Courtney	Matchless							Ret			**0**
-	(United Kingdom) Colin Cross	Norton		Ret								**0**
-	(Northern Ireland) Nigel Crossett	Matchless							Ret			**0**
-	(United Kingdom) Peter Darvill	Norton		Ret								**0**
-	(United Kingdom) Dave Degens	Matchless	Ret									**0**
-	(United Kingdom) Brian Dennis	Velocette		Ret								**0**
-	(South Africa) Raymond Flack	Norton							Ret			**0**
-	(Germany) Ronald Föll	Matchless		Ret								**0**
-	(Germany) Manfred Gäckle	Matchless					Ret					**0**
-	(United Kingdom) Maurice Gittins	Triumph		Ret								**0**
-	(United Kingdom) Tony Godfrey	Norton		Ret								**0**
-	(United Kingdom) Bill Hawthorne	BSA		Ret								**0**
-	(United States) Jeff Hoff	Honda	Ret									**0**
-	(Germany) Lothar John	Norton					Ret					**0**
-	(Argentina) Jorge Kissling	Norton	Ret									**0**
-	(Hungary) György Kurucz	Norton						Ret				**0**
-	(Finland) Teuvo Laakso	Matchless								Ret		**0**
-	(United States) Kurt Leibmann	BMW	Ret									**0**
-	(Sweden) Jack Lindh	Norton							Ret			**0**
-	(Germany) Lothar Luhr	Norton					Ret					**0**
-	(Northern Ireland) Ian McGregor	Norton							Ret			**0**
-	(United States) John McLaughlin	Norton	Ret									**0**
-	(United Kingdom) Michael McStay	Norton		Ret								**0**
-	(United States) Tony Murphy	Honda	Ret									**0**
-	(United States) John Nash	Triumph	Ret									**0**
-	(Italy) Alberto Picca	Gilera									Ret	**0**
-	(Republic of Ireland) Patrick Plunkett	Norton							Ret			**0**
-	(United Kingdom) Norman Price	Norton		Ret								**0**
-	(Germany) Max Raab	Bianchi					Ret					**0**
-	(United Kingdom) Johnnie Rae	Norton		Ret								**0**
-	(United Kingdom) Barry Randle	Norton		Ret								**0**
-	(Finland) Anssi Resko	Matchless								Ret		**0**
-	(Austria) Ladislaus Richter	Norton						Ret				**0**
-	(United Kingdom) John Rudge	Norton		Ret								**0**
-	(United Kingdom) Gerry Saward	Norton		Ret								**0**
-	(Germany) Horst Seidl	Norton					Ret					**0**
-	(United Kingdom) Alan Shepherd	Matchless	Ret									**0**
-	(United States) Fred Simone	BMW	Ret									**0**
-	(Northern Ireland) George Simpson	Norton							Ret			**0**
-	(United Kingdom) Bill Smith	Matchless		Ret								**0**
-	(South Africa) John Smith	Norton					Ret					**0**
-	(United States) Tom Stuart	BMW	Ret									**0**
-	(Sweden) Hans Sevensson	Matchless						Ret				**0**
-	(Finland) Veikko Sulasaari	Norton								Ret		**0**
-	(United Kingdom) John Wilkinson	Norton		Ret								**0**
-	(United Kingdom) Tony Wilmott	Norton		Ret								**0**
-	(United States) Scott Williams	Matchless	Ret									**0**
-	(United Kingdom) Dave Williams	BSA		Ret								**0**
-	(United States) Anthony Woodman	Matchless						Ret				**0**
-	(Germany) Manfred Zeller	Norton					Ret					**0**
-	(United Kingdom) Dennis Ainsworth	Norton					DNS					**0**
-	(Germany) Bernhard Bockelmann	Norton					DNQ					**0**
-	(Germany) Hans Fohr	Matchless					DNQ					**0**
-	(Germany) Hermann Klein	Norton					DNQ					**0**
-	(Germany) Karl Peters	Norton					DNQ					**0**
-	(Germany) Hans Schmidt	BMW					DNQ					**0**
-	(Germany) Rolf Thiemig	Norton					DNQ					**0**
Pos	Rider	Bike	USA (United States)	MAN (United Kingdom)	HOL (Netherlands)	BEL (Belgium)	GER (Germany)	DDR (East Germany)	ULS (Ulster)	FIN (Finland)	NAC (Italy)	Pts

Colour	Result
Gold	Winner
Silver	Second place
Bronze	Third place
Green	Points classification
Blue	Non-points classification
Blue	Non-classified finish (NC)
Purple	Retired, not classified (Ret)
Red	Did not qualify (DNQ)
Red	Did not pre-qualify (DNPQ)
Black	Disqualified (DSQ)
White	Did not start (DNS)
White	Withdrew (WD)
White	Race cancelled (C)
Blank	Did not practice (DNP)
Blank	Did not arrive (DNA)
Blank	Excluded (EX)

**Bold** – Pole
Italics – Fastest Lap

=== 350cc Standings ===
Place	Rider	Number	Country	Machine	Points	Wins
1	(Rhodesia) Jim Redman		Rhodesia	Honda	40	8
2	(Rhodesia) Bruce Beale		Rhodesia	Honda	24	0
3	(Canada) Mike Duff		Canada	AJS	20	0
4	(United Kingdom) Mike Hailwood		United Kingdom	MV Agusta / MZ	12	0
5	(Czechoslovakia) Gustav Havel		Czechoslovakia	Jawa	10	0
6	(United Kingdom) Phil Read		United Kingdom	AJS	6	0
7	(South Africa) Paddy Driver		South Africa	AJS	5	0
8	(Italy) Remo Venturi		Italy	Bianchi	4	0
=	(Soviet Union) Endel Kiisa		Soviet Union	CKEB C364 Vost.	4	0
=	(Czechoslovakia) Stanislav Malina		Czechoslovakia	CZ	4	0
=	(Japan) Isamu Kasuya		Japan	Honda	4	0
12	(United Kingdom) Derek Minter		United Kingdom	Norton	4	0
13	(Italy) Gilberto Milani		Italy	Aermacchi	3	0
=	(United Kingdom) Alan Shepherd		United Kingdom	MZ	3	0
=	(Italy) Renzo Pasolini		Italy	Aermacchi	3	0
=	(Japan) Isao Yamashita		Japan	Honda	3	0
17	(United Kingdom) Derek Woodman		United Kingdom	AJS	3	0
=	(United Kingdom) Vernon Cottle		United Kingdom	AJS	3	0
19	(United Kingdom) Chris Conn		United Kingdom	Norton	2	0
=	(Japan) Kuniomi Nagamatsu		Japan	Honda	2	0
=	(United Kingdom) Fred Stevens		United Kingdom	AJS	2	0
22	(United Kingdom) Joe Dunphy		United Kingdom	Norton	1	0
=	(Australia) Jack Ahearn		Australia	Norton	1	0

=== 250cc Standings ===
Place	Rider	Number	Country	Machine	Points	Wins
1	(United Kingdom) Phil Read		United Kingdom	Yamaha	46	5
2	(Rhodesia) Jim Redman		Rhodesia	Honda	42	3
3	(United Kingdom) Alan Shepherd		United Kingdom	MZ	23	1
4	(Canada) Mike Duff		Canada	Yamaha	20	1
5	(Italy) Tarquinio Provini		Italy	Benelli	15	1
6	(Switzerland) Luigi Taveri		Switzerland	Honda	11	0
7	(Japan) Isamu Kasuya		Japan	Honda	10	0
8	(Rhodesia) Bruce Beale		Rhodesia	Honda	9	0
9	(United Kingdom) Tommy Robb		United Kingdom	Yamaha	7	0
10	(United States) Ron Grant		United States	Parilla	6	0
11	(Italy) Alberto Pagani		Italy	Paton	6	0
12	(Italy) Giacomo Agostini		Italy	Moto Morini	6	0
13	(Austria) Bert Schneider		Austria	Suzuki	5	0
14	(United States) Bob Gehring		United States	Bultaco	4	0
=	(United Kingdom) Ralph Bryans		United Kingdom	Honda	4	0
=	(Japan) Hiroshi Hasegawa		Japan	Yamaha	4	0
17	(Italy) Gilberto Milani		Italy	Aermacchi	4	0
18	(United States) George Rockett		United States	Ducati	3	0
=	(Czechoslovakia) Stanislav Malina		Czechoslovakia	CZ	3	0
20	(United Kingdom) Joe Dunphy		United Kingdom	Greeves	2	0
=	(New Zealand) Hugh Anderson		New Zealand	Suzuki	2	0
=	(Switzerland) Ernst Weiss		Switzerland	Honda	2	0
=	(United Kingdom) Roy Boughey		United Kingdom	Yamaha	2	0
=	(United Kingdom) Mike Hailwood		United Kingdom	MZ	2	0
25	(United States) Douglas Brown		United States	Ducati	1	0
=	(Spain) Jorge Sirera		Spain	Montesa	1	0
=	(France) Roger Mailles		France	Morini	1	0
=	(United Kingdom) Clive Hunt		United Kingdom	Aermacchi	1	0
=	(East Germany) Wolfgang Gast		East Germany	MZ	1	0

=== 125cc ===
==== Riders' standings ====
Pos.	Rider	Bike	USA (United States)	ESP (Spain)	FRA (France)	MAN (Isle of Man)	NED (Netherlands)	FRG (West Germany)	GDR (East Germany)	ULS (Northern Ireland)	FIN (Finland)	NAT (Italy)	JPN (Japan)	Pts
1	(Switzerland) Luigi Taveri	Honda		1**^{F}**	1**^{F}**	1**^{F}**		2	2	2	1	1	2	46 (64)
2	(Rhodesia) Jim Redman	Honda		2		2	1**^{F}**	1	3		3**^{F}**	6		36 (37)
3	(New Zealand) Hugh Anderson	Suzuki	1**^{F}**	5			5	NC**^{F}**	1**^{F}**	1**^{F}**		2**^{F}**	NC**^{F}**	35
4	(Austria) Bert Schneider	Suzuki	3	4	2		4	4		5	4			22 (24)
5	(United Kingdom) Ralph Bryans	Honda				3	3			3	2	4		21
6	(West Germany) Ernst Degner	Suzuki										3	1	12
7	(United Kingdom) Frank Perris	Suzuki			3		6			4		5		10
8	(Japan) Mitsuo Itoh	Suzuki	2											6
8	(United Kingdom) Phil Read	Yamaha					2							6
10	(West Germany) Walter Scheimann	Honda				5		3						6
11	(United Kingdom) Rex Avery	EMC		3										4
11	(Japan) Yoshimi Katayama	Suzuki											3	4
13	(France) Jean-Pierre Beltoise	Bultaco	5		5									4
14	(Japan) Isao Morishita	Suzuki	4											3
14	(Japan) Kunimitsu Takahashi	Honda			4									3
14	(Czechoslovakia) Stanislav Malina	ČZ				4								3
14	(East Germany) Heinz Rosner	MZ							4					3
14	(Japan) Teisuke Tanaka	Suzuki											4	3
19	(West Germany) Richard Thomas	Honda						5						2
19	(East Germany) Friedhelm Kohlar	MZ							5					2
19	(East Germany) Klaus Enderlein	MZ									5			2
19	(Japan) Hiroki Matsushima	Yamaha											5	2
23	(Rhodesia) Bruce Beale	Honda				6			6					2
24	(United Kingdom) Gary Dickinson	Honda	6											1
24	(United Kingdom) Chris Vincent	Honda		6										1
24	(West Germany) Roland Föll	Honda			6									1
24	(West Germany) Peter Eser	Honda						6						1
24	(Spain) Ramón Torras	Bultaco								6				1
24	(East Germany) Dieter Krumpholz	MZ									6			1
24	(Japan) Akiyasu Motohashi	Yamaha											6	1
Pos.	Rider	Bike	USA (United States)	ESP (Spain)	FRA (France)	MAN (Isle of Man)	NED (Netherlands)	FRG (West Germany)	GDR (East Germany)	ULS (Northern Ireland)	FIN (Finland)	NAT (Italy)	JPN (Japan)	Pts

Race key
Colour	Result
Gold	Winner
Silver	2nd place
Bronze	3rd place
Green	Points finish
Blue	Non-points finish
Blue	Non-classified finish (NC)
Purple	Retired (Ret)
Red	Did not qualify (DNQ)
Black	Disqualified (DSQ)
White	Did not start (DNS)
White	Withdrew (WD)
White	Race cancelled (C)
Blank	Did not practice (DNP)
Blank	Excluded (EX)
Blank	Did not arrive (DNA)
Blank	Did not enter (empty cell)
Annotation	Meaning
P	Pole position
F	Fastest lap
Rider key
Colour	Meaning
Light blue	Rookie rider

==== Constructors' standings ====
Each constructor is awarded the same number of points as their best placed rider in each race.

Pos.	Constructor	USA (United States)	ESP (Spain)	FRA (France)	MAN (Isle of Man)	NED (Netherlands)	FRG (West Germany)	GDR (East Germany)	ULS (Northern Ireland)	FIN (Finland)	NAT (Italy)	JPN (Japan)	Pts
1	(Japan) Honda	6	1	1	1	1	1	2	2	1	1	2	48 (75)
2	(Japan) Suzuki	1	4	2		4	4	1	1	4	2	1	44 (56)
3	(Japan) Yamaha					2						5	8
4	(East Germany) MZ							4		5			5
5	(Spain) Bultaco	5		5					6				5
6	(United Kingdom) EMC		3										4
7	(Czechoslovakia) ČZ				4								3
Pos.	Constructor	USA (United States)	ESP (Spain)	FRA (France)	MAN (Isle of Man)	NED (Netherlands)	FRG (West Germany)	GDR (East Germany)	ULS (Northern Ireland)	FIN (Finland)	NAT (Italy)	JPN (Japan)	Pts

=== 50cc Standings ===
Place	Rider	Number	Country	Machine	Points	Wins
1	(New Zealand) Hugh Anderson		New Zealand	Suzuki	38	4
2	(United Kingdom) Ralph Bryans		United Kingdom	Honda	30	3
3	(West Germany) Hans-Georg Anscheidt		West Germany	Kreidler	29	1
4	(Japan) Isao Morishita		Japan	Suzuki	25	0
5	(Japan) Mitsuo Itoh		Japan	Suzuki	19	0
6	(France) Jean-Pierre Beltoise		France	Kreidler	6	0
7	(Switzerland) Luigi Taveri		Switzerland	Honda	5	0
8	(Spain) José Busquets		Spain	Derbi	3	0
9	(West Germany) Rudolf Kunz		West Germany	Kreidler	3	0
10	(Spain) Angel Nieto		Spain	Derbi	2	0
=	(Netherlands) Cees van Dongen		Netherlands	Kreidler	2	0
=	(West Germany) Peter Eser		West Germany	Honda	2	0
13	(United States) Lee Allen		United States	Ducati	1	0
=	(Italy) Tarquinio Provini		Italy	Kreidler	1	0
=	(Japan) Naomi Taniguchi		Japan	Honda	1	0
15	(West Germany) Albert Beirle		West Germany	Kreidler	1	0
=	(United Kingdom) Charlie Mates		United Kingdom	Honda	1	0
