= Parriott =

Parriott is a surname. Notable people with the surname include:

- Buddy Parriott, American motorcycle road racer
- James D. Parriott (born 1950), American writer, director, and producer
- Ruth Parriott, American businesswoman
- Sam Parriott, American drag racer
- Sara Parriott, American screenwriter
