= Gustav Havel =

- Nationality: Czech
- Born: 27 August 1930
- Died: 30 December 1967 (aged 37); Prague, Czechoslovakia
Motorcycle racing career statistics
Grand Prix motorcycle racing
Active years	1961–1967
First race	1961 350cc West German Grand Prix
Last race	1967 350cc Czechoslovak Grand Prix
Team(s)	Jawa, ČZ
Starts / Wins / Podiums / Poles / F. laps / Points; 21 / 0 / 9 / N/A / N/A / 71

Gustav Havel (27 August 1930 – 30 December 1967) was a Czech Grand Prix motorcycle road racer. Havel began his Grand Prix career in 1961 with Jawa. He enjoyed his best season in 1961 when he finished the season in third place in the 350cc world championship behind Gary Hocking and his Jawa teammate, František Šťastný.

Haval died during a motorcycle crash in 1967.

== Motorcycle Grand Prix results ==
Points system from 1950 to 1968:

Position	1	2	3	4	5	6
Points	8	6	4	3	2	1

(key) (Races in italics indicate fastest lap)

Year	Class	Team	1	2	3	4	5	6	7	8	9	10	11	12	13	Points	Rank	Wins
1961	350cc	Jawa		GER; 2		IOM; 27	NED; 8		DDR; 4	ULS -	NAT; 3	SWE; 2				19	3rd	0
1962	350cc	Jawa	IOM; Ret	NED -		ULS; 5	DDR; 4	NAT; 5	FIN -							7	7th	0
1962	500cc	Jawa	IOM -	NED -	BEL -	ULS; Ret	DDR -	NAT -	FIN -	ARG -						0	-	0
1963	350cc	Jawa	GER; 4	IOM -	NED; 6	ULS -	DDR; 4	FIN -	NAT -							7	5th	0
1964	350cc	Jawa				IOM; Ret	NED -		GER -	DDR; 2	ULS; 3	FIN -	NAT -	JPN -		10	5th	0
1964	500cc	Jawa	USA -			IOM -	NED; Ret	BEL -	GER; Ret	DDR; 7	ULS; Ret	FIN -	NAT; Ret			0	-	0
1965	350cc	Jawa		GER; 3			IOM; Ret	NED -		DDR; 3	CZE -	ULS; 3	FIN -	NAT -	JPN -	12	7th	0
1965	500cc	Jawa	USA -	GER -			IOM -	NED -	BEL -	DDR -	CZE; Ret	ULS; 7	FIN; Ret	NAT -		0	-	0
1966	350cc	Jawa		GER; 5	FRA -	NED; 5		DDR; 3	CZE -	FIN; Ret	ULS; 4	IOM; Ret	NAT; 6	JPN -		12	5th	0
1966	500cc	Jawa		GER; Ret-		NED; 11	BEL -	DDR; 14	CZE; 11	FIN; Ret	ULS; 9	IOM -	NAT; Ret			17	29th	0
1967	350 cc	Jawa		GER -		IOM -	NED; Ret		DDR -	CZE; 4		ULS -	NAT -		JPN -	3	13th	0
1967	500 cc	Jawa		GER -		IOM -	NED -	BEL -	DDR -	CZE; Ret	FIN -	ULS -	NAT -	CAN -		0	-	0
