= Ralph Bryans =

British motorcycle racer

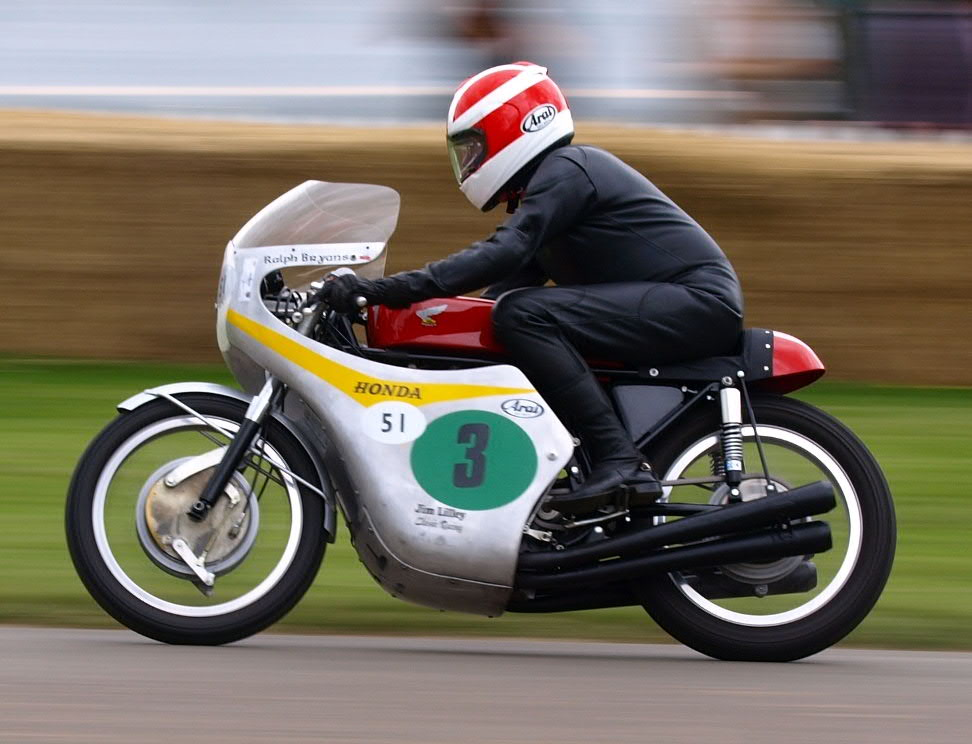
- Ralph Bryans demonstrating a Honda in 2008
- Nationality: British
- Born: 7 March 1941; Belfast, Northern Ireland
- Died: 6 August 2014 (aged 73); Scotland
Motorcycle racing career statistics
Grand Prix motorcycle racing
Active years	1962 - 1967
First race	1962 50cc Isle of Man TT
Last race	1967 350cc Japanese Grand Prix
First win	1964 50cc Dutch TT
Last win	1967 250cc Japanese Grand Prix
Team	Honda
Championships	50cc - 1965
Starts / Wins / Podiums / Poles / F. laps / Points; 62 / 10 / 40 / 0 / 7

Ralph Bryans (7 March 1941 – 6 August 2014) was a Grand Prix motorcycle road racer from Northern Ireland. Bryans was Ireland's only Grand Prix world champion, winning the 50 cc title in 1965.

== Racing career ==
Bryans started road-riding on a BSA Bantam when working as a sixteen-year-old apprentice fitter. He entered his first race, the 1959 Tandragee 100, on a borrowed Ambassador 199 cc. For the 1960 season, he fitted a Triumph Terrier 150 cc engine to his Bantam frame, winning the 1960 Irish 200 cc Championship.

For the 1961 season, Bryans then progressed to a 1958 350 cc Manx Norton provided by sponsor James Wilson, an insurance broker, further-learning his skills in company of established racers Tommy Robb, Dick Creith and George Purvis. In 1962, Bryans first entered the Isle of Man TT and later in the Ulster Grand Prix was placed ninth in 350 cc class riding his Wilson-Norton and tenth in the 500 cc class on a Reg Dearden Manx Norton.

In December 1962, Bryans arranged to ride Joe Ryan Nortons during 1963, when he was first noticed by Jim Redman at the Ulster Grand Prix. Bultaco signed Bryans after 'guest riding' their machines in Spain, but allowed Bryans to take advantage of a later offer from Honda to ride works machines in 1964, during which he was placed second in the 50 cc class and third in the 125 cc TT races. In 1965, Bryans won three races along with two second-place finishes to win the 50cc world championship for the Honda factory racing team.

After a short illness, Bryans died at his home in Scotland at age 72 on 6 August 2014.

== Motorcycle Grand Prix results ==
Position	1	2	3	4	5	6
Points	8	6	4	3	2	1

(key) (Races in italics indicate fastest lap)

Year	Class	Team	1	2	3	4	5	6	7	8	9	10	11	12	13	Points	Rank	Wins
1962	50cc	Benelli	ESP -	FRA -	IOM; 15	NED -	BEL -	GER -		DDR -	NAT -	FIN -	ARG -			0	-	0
1962	350cc	Wilson Norton			IOM; NC	NED -			ULS; 10	DDR -	NAT -	FIN -				0	-	0
1963	125cc	Honda	ESP -	GER -	FRA -	IOM; 9	NED -	BEL -	ULS -	DDR -	FIN -	NAT -	ARG -	JPN -		0	-	0
1963	250cc	Benelli	ESP -	GER -		IOM; NC	NED -	BEL -	ULS -	DDR -		NAT -	ARG -	JPN -		0	-	0
1963	500cc	Norton				IOM -	NED -	BEL -	ULS; 5	DDR -	FIN -	NAT -	ARG -			2	14th	0
1964	50cc	Honda	USA -	ESP; NC	FRA; NC	IOM; 2	NED; 1	BEL; 1	GER; 1			FIN -		JPN -		30	2nd	3
1964	125cc	Honda	USA -	ESP -	FRA -	IOM; 3	NED; 3		GER; NC	DDR; 8	ULS; 3	FIN; 2	NAT; 4	JPN -		21	5th	0
1964	250cc	Honda	USA -	ESP -	FRA -	IOM -	NED -	BEL -	GER -	DDR -	ULS; 3		NAT -	JPN -		4	14th	0
1965	50cc	Honda	USA -	GER; 1	ESP; 2	FRA; 1	IOM; NC	NED; 1	BEL; 5						JPN; 2	36	1st	3
1965	125cc	Honda	USA -	GER; NC	ESP; NC	FRA; NC	IOM; 6	NED -		DDR -	CZE -	ULS; 4	FIN; 4	NAT -	JPN; 3	11	8th	0
1965	250cc	Honda	USA -	GER -	ESP -	FRA -	IOM -	NED -	BEL -	DDR -	CZE -	ULS; 5	FIN; 3	NAT -	JPN -	6	13th	0
1966	50cc	Honda	ESP; 3	GER; 2	NED; 2					IOM; 1	NAT; 2	JPN -				26	2nd	1
1966	125cc	Honda	ESP; 3	GER; 2	NED; NC	DDR; 6	CZE; 2	FIN; 3	ULS; 2	IOM; 7	NAT; 2	JPN -				32	3rd	0
1967	250cc	Honda	ESP; 2	GER; 1	FRA; 4	IOM; 3	NED; 3	BEL; 3	DDR; 3	CZE; 4	FIN; NC	ULS; 2	NAT; 3	CAN; 3	JPN; 1	40	4th	2
1967	350cc	Honda		GER -		IOM -	NED -		DDR -	CZE -		ULS; 2	NAT; 1		JPN; 2	20	3rd	1
