= List of Grand Prix motorcycle racers: T =

- (Japan) Tadahiko Taira
- (Japan) Kunimitsu Takahashi
- (Japan) Yuki Takahashi
- (Japan) Takumi Takahashi
- (Hungary) Gábor Talmácsi
- (Japan) Makoto Tamada
- (Italy) Roberto Tamburini
- (Japan) Teisuke Tanaka
- (Japan) Naomi Taniguchi
- (Italy) Davide Tardozzi
- (Switzerland) Luigi Taveri
- (Italy) Omobono Tenni
- (Spain) Nicolás Terol
- (Austria) Rudi Thalhammer
- (Spain) Arturo Tizón
- (Netherlands) Aalt Toersen
- (Japan) Masaki Tokudome
- (Japan) Shoya Tomizawa
- (Spain) Ricardo Tormo
- (Italy) Armando Torocco
- (Spain) Ramón Torras
- (Spain) Herri Torrontegui
- (Hungary) Imre Tóth
- (France) Jean-Louis Tournadre
- (Japan) Takeshi Tsujimura
- (Japan) Takuya Tsuda
- (Spain) Mateo Túnez
- (New Zealand) Keith Turner
