= Karl Recktenwald =

German Grand Prix motorcycle racer (1931 - 1964)

Karl Recktenwald (23 April 1931 - 19 July 1964) was a German professional Grand Prix motorcycle racer. He competed in the 500cc class in the motorcycle world championship between 1960 and 1964, and died following an accident at the 1964 West German Grand Prix at Solitudering in Stuttgart. He was nicknamed "the fastest police officer in Europe".

== Biography ==
Recktenwald was born the only son of Rosa and Walter Recktenwald in Winterbach in the territory of the Saar Basin. After finishing school, he completed an apprenticeship as a bricklayer and then joined the Saarland police force, where he served as a motorcycle policeman. Alongside his job, he began competing in his first motorcycle races and set up a restaurant, the ‘Gaststätte Waldeck’, in his parents’ house.

=== Motorcycle racing career ===
From the late 1950s onwards, Recktenwald began to rack up his first victories and podium finishes at local motorcycle racing events, which led him to turn professional in motor racing and be given the nickname "fastest police officer in Europe". He achieved his best race finish at St. Wendel in 1964, when he finished second at the Internationaler Preis Saarlandes after leading for a majority of the race and engaging in a battle with Jack Ahearn.

Between 1960 and 1964, Recktenwald competed in seven World Championship races without scoring any championship points. His best Grand Prix result was tenth place in the 500cc race at the Dutch TT in Assen, which saw him finish 44th overall (out of 89) in the 1964 championship.

=== Death ===
On 19 July 1964, at the 1964 West German Grand Prix at Solitudering in Stuttgart, Recktenwald had moved up to seventh place by lap 2 and was battling with fellow privateer racer Walter Scheimann. On lap 17, Scheimann’s rear wheel locked up at the end of the Hedersbach bend, a tight right-hand corner, and Recktenwald, who was behind him at the time, collided with the rear wheel. Scheimann sustained minor injuries from the crash, whilst Recktenwald was taken to hospital in Leonberg with a diagnosed broken lower leg. He was diagnosed with severe internal injuries and died at around 5:30 pm that day from complications, at the age of 33.

Recktenwald was buried at the cemetery of his birthplace Winterbach, and a memorial of him was erected at the Hedersbach bend by the Motorsport club Allerburg Saar.

== Grand Prix motorcycle racing results ==
Year	Class	Bike	1	2	3	4	5	6	7	8	9	10	Pos	Pts
1960	500cc	Norton	FRA	MAN	HOL	BEL	GER; 19	ULS	NAC				60th	0
1961	500cc	Norton	GER; Ret	FRA	MAN	HOL	BEL	DDR	ULS	NAC	SWE	ARG	-	0
1962	500cc	Norton	MAN	HOL; 14	BEL	ULS; 14	DDR	NAC	FIN	ARG			57th	0
1963	500cc	Norton	MAN	HOL; 11	BEL	ULS	DDR	FIN	NAC	ARG			44th	0
1964	500cc	Norton	USA	MAN	HOL; 10	BEL	GER; Ret	DDR	ULS	FIN	NAC		45th	0
