= Alan Shepherd =

British motorcycle racer

- Nationality: British
- Born: 28 September 1935; Keswick, Cumbria
- Died: 16 July 2007 (aged 71); Kendal, Cumbria
Motorcycle racing career statistics
Grand Prix motorcycle racing
Active years	1959 – 1964
First race	1959 350cc Isle of Man TT
Last race	1964 250cc Nations Grand Prix
First win	1962 500cc Finnish Grand Prix
Last win	1964 250cc United States Grand Prix
Team	MZ
Championships	0
Starts / Wins / Podiums / Poles / F. laps / Points; 35 / 2 / 20 / N/A / 3 / 141

Alan Shepherd (28 September 1935 – 16 July 2007) was a British Grand Prix motorcycle road racer. His best seasons were in 1962 and 1963, when he rode a Matchless to finish in second place in the 500cc world championship, both times to Mike Hailwood. Shepherd was a three-time winner of the North West 200 race in Northern Ireland and finished on the podium twice at the Isle of Man TT.

== Motorcycle racing career ==
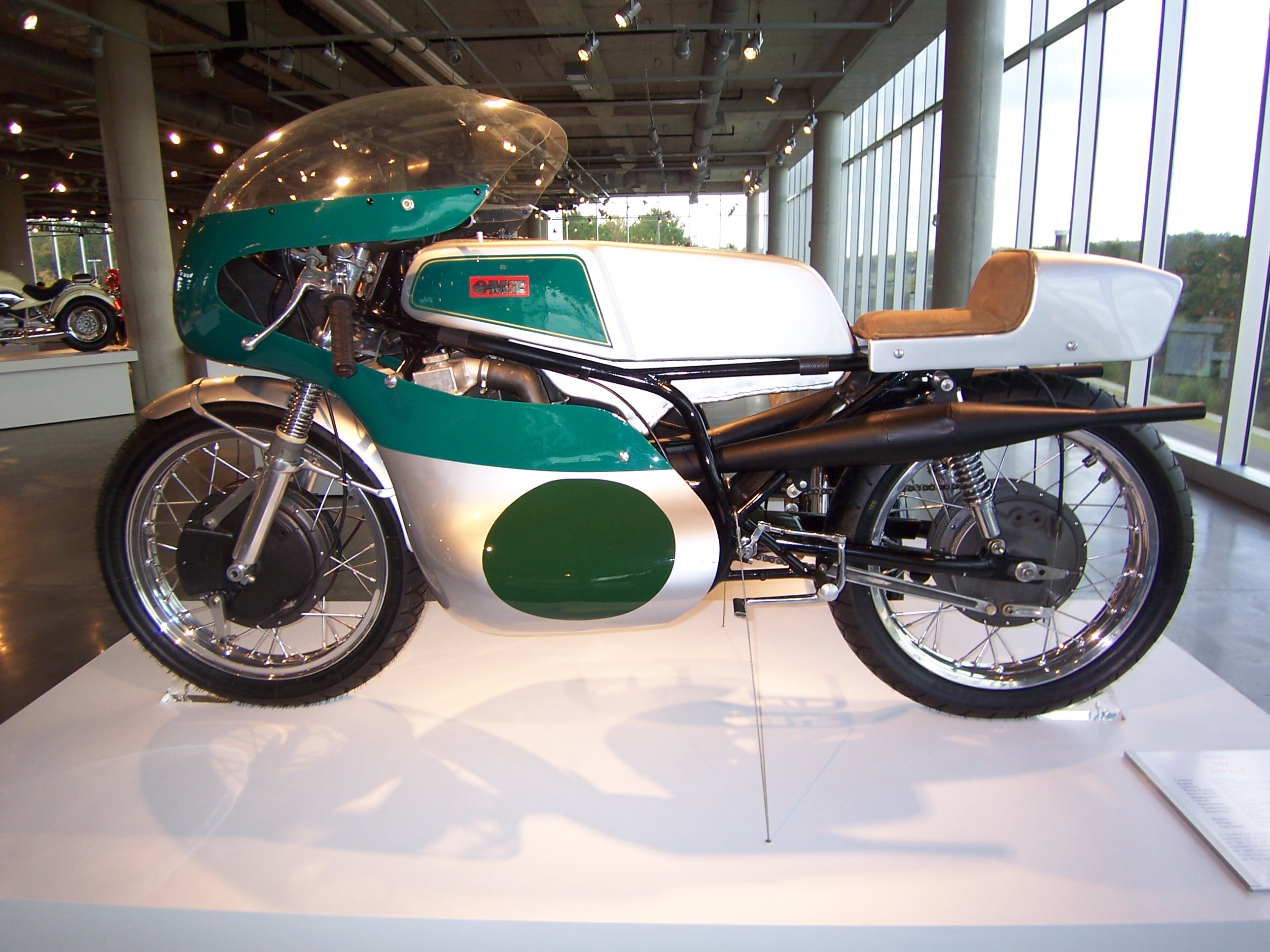
MZ 250 cc GP as ridden by Shepherd

Shepherd was born in Keswick, Cumbria. His family moved to Cartmel at the outbreak of World War II. His first motorcycle was a Royal Enfield Bullet earned from a job doing a milk round with his father. He later moved to Bradford where he served as an apprentice cabinet maker. Shepherd was a member of the Royal Signals Motorcycle Display Team during his National Service.

In 1956, Shepherd was persuaded to compete in the Isle of Man TT. He rode his own motorcycle to the dock in Liverpool and took the ferry to the Isle where, he finished in an impressive third place in the Clubmans Junior TT at the 1956 Isle of Man TT. Shepherd won the 1958 Junior Manx Grand Prix riding an AJS. He scored a double victory at the 1962 North West 200 when he claimed first place results in the 350cc and 500cc classes.

Shepherd's greatest success came when he joined the East German MZ factory racing team led by their lead Development Engineer Walter Kaaden, known for his groundbreaking work in two stroke engine technology. Although MZ provided him with a motorcycle, the impoverished factory struggled to provide much support and, he competed while functioning as his own mechanic. Despite competing on a limited budget, Shepherd managed to win the season-opening 250cc United States Grand Prix, held at the Daytona International Speedway then, placed second to Honda's Jim Redman at the Isle of Man Lightweight TT to finish the 1964 250cc world championship season in third place behind the powerful Yamaha and Honda teams represented by Phil Read and Redman.

In 1964 when a resident of Grange-over-Sands, Lancashire, England, Shepherd was allowed to keep his MZ 125 cc single cylinder and MZ 250 cc twin cylinder machines as part of his earnings due to currency difficulties with East Germany. He offered these two MZ for sale through Motor Cycle, a UK weekly magazine.

Shepherd retired in 1965 after recovering from a head injury suffered in late 1964 when testing a works Honda in preparation for the 1964 Japanese Grand Prix. He told Motor Cycle's David Dixon in June 1965 that – whilst he felt fully recovered – he no longer had the confidence to be a top-runner, and would not ride Hondas unless he could give the best possible performance.

Shepherd died peacefully at Summerhill Nursing Home, Kendal, Cumbria in July 2007, with a funeral service at Cartmel Priory followed by cremation at Lancaster.

== Motorcycle Grand Prix results ==
Position	1	2	3	4	5	6
Points	8	6	4	3	2	1

(key) (Races in italics indicate fastest lap)

Year	Class	Team	1	2	3	4	5	6	7	8	9	10	11	12	Points	Rank	Wins
1959	350cc	AJS	FRA -	IOM; NC	GER -	NED -	BEL -	SWE -	ULS -	NAT -					0	-	0
1959	500cc	Matchless	FRA -	IOM; 7	GER	NED	BEL	SWE	ULS	NAT					0	-	0
1960	350cc	AJS	FRA -	IOM; 7	NED -	BEL -	GER -	ULS -	NAT -						0	-	0
1960	500cc	Matchless	FRA -	IOM; NC	NED -	BEL -	GER -	ULS; 3	NAT -						4	10th	0
1961	125cc	MZ	ESP -	GER; 2	FRA -	IOM; NC	NED; 3	BEL; 5	DDR -	ULS -	NAT -	SWE -	ARG -		12	7th	0
1961	250cc	MZ	ESP -	GER; 5	FRA -	IOM; NC	NED -	BEL -	DDR; 5	ULS; 5	NAT -	SWE -	ARG -		6	10th	0
1961	350cc	Bianchi		GER -		IOM -	NED -		DDR -	ULS; 5	NAT; 4	SWE -			5	10th	0
1962	125cc	MZ	ESP -	FRA -	IOM -	NED -	BEL -	GER -	ULS -	DDR -	NAT -	FIN; 3	ARG -		4	13th	0
1962	350cc	MZ			IOM; NC	NED -			ULS; 4	DDR -	NAT -	FIN; 3			7	6th	0
1962	500cc	Matchless			IOM; NC	NED; 4	BEL; 2		ULS; 2	DDR; 2	NAT -	FIN; 1	ARG -		29	2nd	1
1963	125cc	MZ	ESP -	GER; 6	FRA -	IOM -	NED -	BEL -	ULS -	DDR; 2	FIN; 3	NAT -	ARG -	JPN -	11	8th	0
1963	250cc	MZ	ESP -	GER; 5		IOM; NC	NED -	BEL -	ULS -	DDR; 2		NAT; 4	ARG -	JPN -	11	6th	0
1963	350cc	MZ		GER -		IOM; 35	NED -	BEL -	ULS -	DDR -	FIN -	NAT; 2		JPN -	6	6th	0
1963	500cc	Matchless				IOM; NC	NED; 3	BEL; 3	ULS; 4	DDR; 3	FIN; 2	NAT -	ARG -		21	2nd	0
1964	250cc	MZ	USA; 1	ESP -	FRA -	IOM; 2	NED -	BEL; 3	GER -	DDR -	ULS; 4		NAT; 5	JPN -	23	3rd	1
1964	350cc	MZ				IOM; NC	NED -		GER -	DDR -	ULS -	FIN; 4	NAT -	JPN -	3	13th	0
