= Derek Woodman =

British motorcycle racer

- Nationality: British
Motorcycle racing career statistics
Grand Prix motorcycle racing
Active years	1964 – 1969
First race	1964 Isle of Man 350cc Junior TT
Last race	1969 Isle of Man 500cc Senior TT
Team	MZ
Championships	0
Starts / Wins / Podiums / Poles / F. laps / Points; 44 / 0 / 6 / 0 / 0 / 141

Derek Woodman was a British former Grand Prix motorcycle road racer. His best season was in 1965 when he rode an MZ to finish the year in third place in the 125cc world championship, behind Hugh Anderson and Frank Perris. In 1964, Woodman teamed with Brian Setchell to win the Thruxton 500 endurance race.
