= Isamu Kasuya =

Japanese motorcycle racer

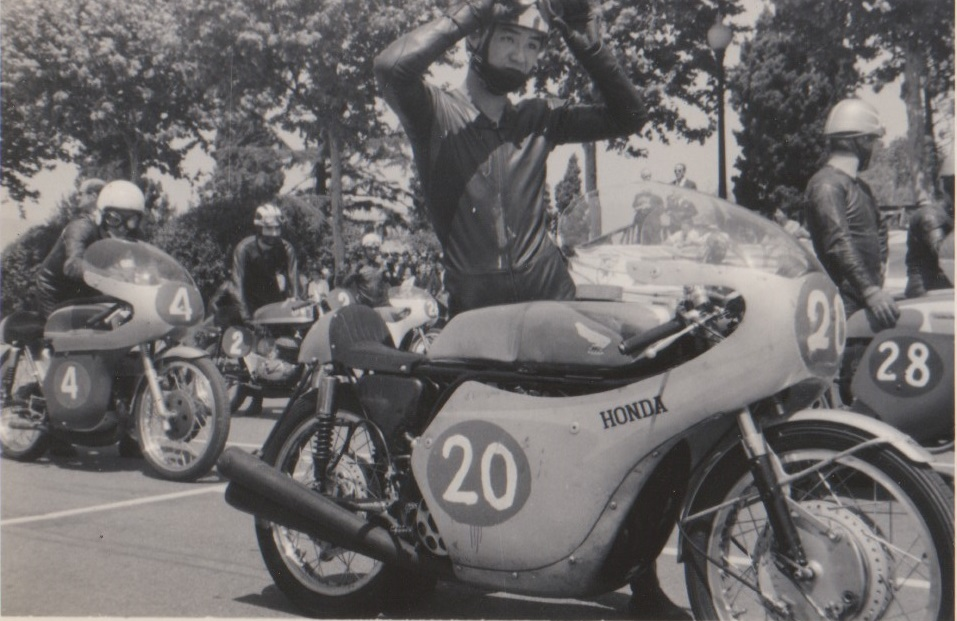
- Isamu Kasuya in 1963
- Nationality: Japanese
Motorcycle racing career statistics
Grand Prix motorcycle racing
Active years	1963 - 1965
First race	1963 250cc Japanese Grand Prix
Last race	1965 350cc Japanese Grand Prix
Team	Honda
Starts / Wins / Podiums / Poles / F. laps / Points; 9 / 0 / 4 / N/A / N/A / 25

Isamu Kasuya (粕谷勇, Kasuya Isamu) is a Japanese former professional Grand Prix motorcycle road racer. Kasuya began his Grand Prix career in 1963. He had his best season in 1964 when he finished the season in seventh place in the 250cc world championship, and eighth place in the 350cc world championship.
