= John Cooper (motorcyclist) =

British motorcycle racer

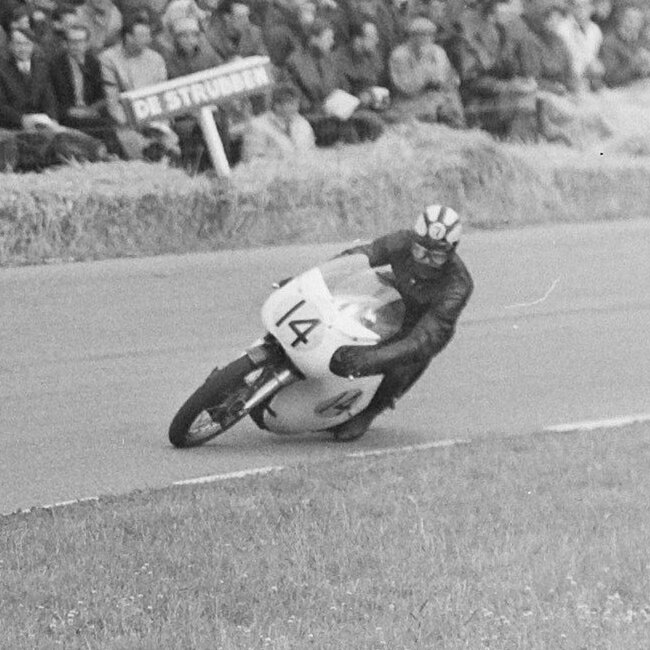
- Cooper at Dutch TT in 1966
- Nationality: (United Kingdom) British
- Born: January 24, 1938 (age 88); Derby, England
Motorcycle racing career statistics
Grand Prix motorcycle racing
| Active years | 1964 - 1972 |
| First race | 1964 250cc, 350cc, 500cc Senior TT |
| Last race | 1972 350cc Junior TT |
Starts / Wins / Podiums / Poles / F. laps / Points; 11 / 0 / 2 / 0 / 0 / 26

John Cooper (born 24 January 1938) is an English former professional motorcycle racer and garage proprietor. He participated in British short-circuit motorcycle road racing during the 1960s and early 1970s, and won the Mallory Park Race of the Year in 1965, 1970 and 1971.

He also entered selected world championship Grands Prix motorcycle races. Cooper's motorcycle racing career extended over almost 20 years, mostly as a privateer rider, before experiencing his greatest achievements during the final three years of his career, most prominently at the 1971 Mallory Park Race of the Year, when he defeated the reigning 500cc world champion, Giacomo Agostini for a surprising upset victory.

== Racing career ==
John 'Mooneyes' Cooper was born in Derby, England. He had the given name of John Herbert Cooper. He started motorcycle racing in Derbyshire by riding a rigid-framed 197cc James entering off-road trials in 1954 at age 16. He progressed to a plunger-sprung James track race bike tuned by Harry Lomas (father of racer Bill Lomas) entering informal events organised by his local Derby club at Osmaston Manor. For 1958 Cooper had a different James powered by a tuned Triumph Tiger Cub engine, which he raced against Percy Tait who also had a Cub.

Cooper had a long-standing association with motorcycle dealer Wraggs. By 1960, he was riding their BSA Gold Star for the 500cc class and later a 350cc Gold Star engined Norton. 1961 saw Wraggs providing him with 1960 350 and 500 Manx Nortons which he later purchased in 1964, selling them on in 1966. A trained mechanic, he preferred to work on his own bikes, excepting the engine preparation which was by respected tuner Francis Beart.

Cooper first entered the TT races in 1964, scoring ninth-place in the Senior 500cc race, failing to finish in the other classes and again in the 1965 races when riding a 250cc Greeves with 350 and 500 Nortons.

Cooper was famously known as 'Mooneyes'. He initially decorated his helmet with the initials 'J C' followed by a hand-drawn cartoon character "Jiminy Cricket", continuing the 'J C' theme. His helmet was rejected by race officials, so he painted a new helmet red but found it plain. Adding two stick-on giant 'eyes', a motoring gimmick of the 1960s, endured as his personal design throughout his career.

Cooper's experience and successes continued throughout the 1960s becoming a rival to Derek Minter who retired from racing in 1967. Minter was known by his race successes as 'King of Brands', and Cooper as 'Master of Mallory'. A section of the Mallory Park, Leicestershire circuit has been renamed from Lake Esses to the John Cooper Esses in his honor.

Cooper rode a variety of machinery during his race career, including a Kawasaki 250 cc twin in the 1967 Lightweight TT, Norton twins, Seeley AJS 350 cc and Seeley Matchless 500 cc, 250 cc and 350 cc Yamsels – Yamaha two-stroke engines fitted into Seeley frames, and in the 1970 Production 750 cc TT race on a works Honda CB750, finishing in ninth place, before being associated with the works BSA Rocket 3.

His best season in world championship competition came in 1967 when he finished the year in seventh place in the 500cc world championship. Cooper was a two-time winner of the North West 200 race held in Northern Ireland.

His greatest accomplishment as a motorcycle racer came on September 19, 1971 at the prestigious Mallory Park Race of the Year against a field of top-ranked competitors including the reigning 500cc World Champion, Giacomo Agostini, as well as Phil Read, Rod Gould, Gary Nixon, Jarno Saarinen, Paul Smart and a teenage Barry Sheene. At the time, the MV Agusta factory had won 14 consecutive 500cc World Championships, including five won by Agostini, and were the prohibitive favorites to win the race. Cooper aboard his BSA Rocket 3 battled Agostini and his MV Agusta lap after lap, before passing the world champion to finish three-fifths of a second ahead of Agostini.

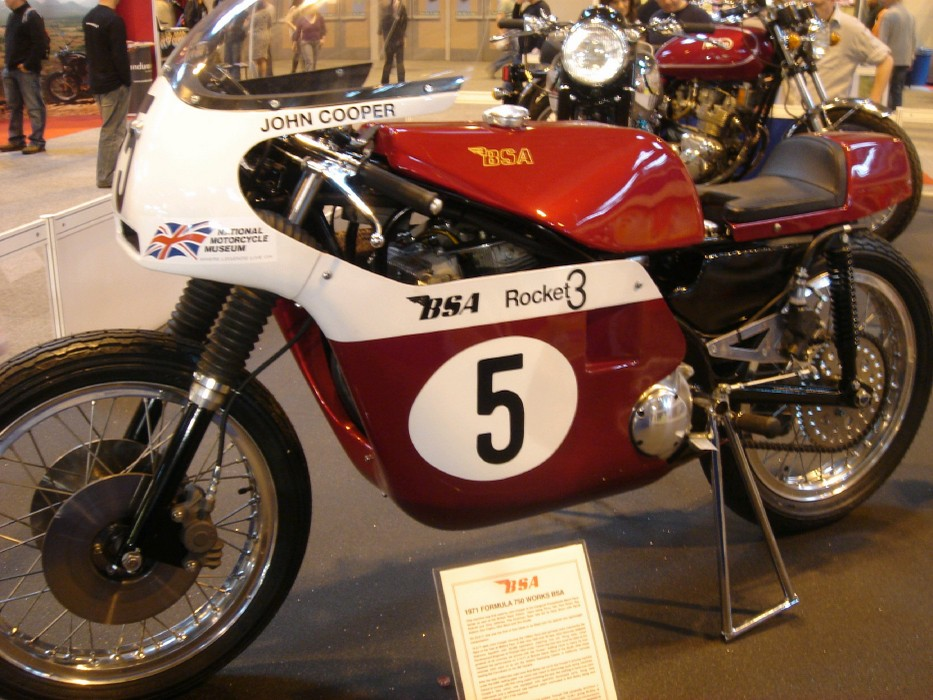
John Cooper's BSA Rocket 3

On October 17, 1971, Cooper rode the BSA Rocket 3 to victory at the 1971 Champion Spark Plug Classic held at the Ontario Motor Speedway in the United States. The race featured the largest purse in AMA racing history and that attracted world-class riders such as Phil Read, Barry Sheene and Rod Gould. The 250-mile event was run in two 125-mile heat races, with Cooper finishing second to Gary Nixon in the first heat before claiming a dramatic victory in the second heat with a last corner pass around Kel Carruthers. Cooper claimed the overall victory and the $14,500 prize money for first place (approximately $110,190 in 2024).

== Personal life ==
Cooper was a trained mechanic and after National Service in 1958 he worked as a manager for his father's gents' outfitters in Derby.

Establishing his own garage in 1965 and later car sales, Cooper retired from the businesses between 2007 and 2011.

After this time, there are two separate businesses associated with his name, one being a car and motorcycle garage in the old premises at Chandos Pole Street, Derby, and the other a motorcycle tyre retailer in a nearby unit.
