= Robin Fitton =

British motorcycle racer

Edwin Robin Fitton
- Nationality: (United Kingdom) British
- Born: April 5, 1928; Leeds, England
- Died: May 2, 1970 (aged 42); Adenau, West Germany
Motorcycle racing career statistics
Grand Prix motorcycle racing
Active years	1964-1965, 1967-1969
First race	1964 500cc Ulster Grand Prix
Last race	1969 500cc Ulster Grand Prix
Championships	0
Starts / Wins / Podiums / Poles / F. laps / Points; 9 / 0 / 1 / 0 / 0 / 37

Edwin Robin Fitton (5 April 1928 - 2 May 1970) was a British professional motorcycle racer. He competed in Grand Prix motorcycle racing from 1964 to 1969.

Fitton was born in Leeds, England, on April 5, 1928, and attended school at Aireborough, just north of Leeds. At the age of 16, he acquired his first motorcycle, a BSA Sloper. He began competing in motorcycle trials until a visit to Cadwell Park convinced him to begin competing in road racing. He studied civil engineering at University of Bradford. By 1947, he was racing a 1931 Montgomery-JAP at Cadwell Park. He also competed in grasstrack competitions.

Fitton's best season was in 1968 when he finished the year in fourth place in the 500cc world championship. Fitton was killed at the Nürburgring during practice for the 1970 West German Grand Prix.
