= Bruce Beale =

Rhodesian motorcycle racer (1941–2002)

- Nationality: Rhodesian
- Born: 16 January 1941
- Died: 17 May 2002 (age 61)
Motorcycle racing career statistics
Grand Prix motorcycle racing
Active years	1964–1966
First race	1964 Isle of Man 125cc Lightweight TT
Last race	1966 250cc Nations Grand Prix
Team	Honda
Championships	0
Starts / Wins / Podiums / Poles / F. laps / Points; 45 / 0 / 8 / N/A / N/A / 81

Bruce Beale (16 January 1941 – 17 May 2002) was a Rhodesian professional motorcycle rider. His best year was in 1964 when he finished second in the 350cc Grand Prix world championship, behind his countryman, Jim Redman.
