= Edoardo Bianchi =

Italian entrepreneur and inventor

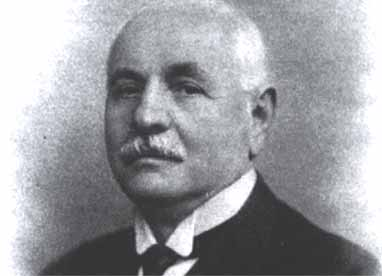
Edoardo Bianchi

Edoardo Bianchi (17 July 1865, Milan – 3 July 1946, Varese) was an Italian entrepreneur and inventor who founded the bicycle manufacturing company Bianchi in 1885 and the Italian automobile manufacturer Autobianchi. Much like Henry Ford was to the modern automobile, Edoardo Bianchi was to the modern bicycle. C's business and manufacturing innovations coupled uniquely well with the technical contributions provided by his company's “Reparto Corse,” securing Bianchi's place on the podium as one of the most influential manufacturers in bike racing history and cycling at large.
