= Ramón Torras =

Catalan motorcycle racer (1943–1965)

Ramon Torras
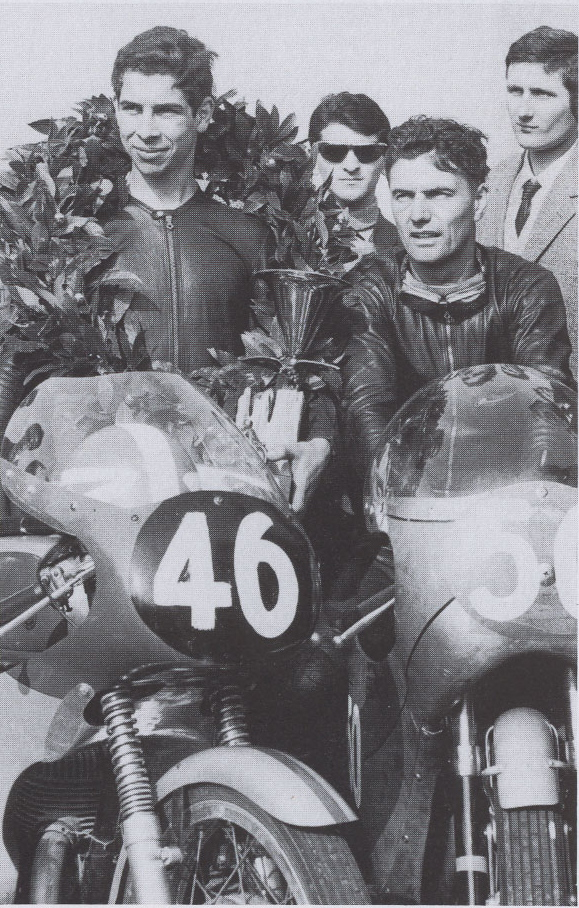
- Ramon Torras (left) and Jim Redman in Modena, 1963
- Nationality: Spain
- Born: 22 December 1943; Barcelona, Spain
- Died: 30 May 1965; Coma-Ruga, Spain
Motorcycle racing career statistics
Grand Prix motorcycle racing
Active years	1964 - 1965
First race	1964 125cc Ulster Grand Prix
Last race	1965 250cc Spanish Grand Prix
Team	Bultaco
Starts / Wins / Podiums / Poles / F. laps / Points; 4 / 0 / 3 / 0 / 0 / 15

Ramon Torras Figueras (22 December 1943 – 30 May 1965) was a Catalan Grand Prix motorcycle road racer from Spain.

Torras was born in Barcelona. His best year was 1965, when he finished in eighth place in the 250cc world championship.

Torras missed some races due to national service and was killed in 1965 when he crashed in heavy rain whilst riding his factory Bultaco at a race in Coma-ruga, Spain.
