= Dick Creith =

British motorcycle racer

- Nationality: Northern Ireland
Motorcycle racing career statistics
Grand Prix motorcycle racing
Active years	1964 - 1965
First race	1964 500cc Ulster Grand Prix
Last race	1965 500cc Ulster Grand Prix
First win	1965 500cc Ulster Grand Prix
Last win	1965 500cc Ulster Grand Prix
Championships	0
Starts / Wins / Podiums / Poles / F. laps / Points; 2 / 1 / 2 / N/A / N/A / 14

Dick Creith (born 28 August 1938) was a former Grand Prix motorcycle road racer from Bushmills. He competed in only two Grand Prix races during his career, the 1964 and 1965 500cc Ulster Grand Prix. He won the 1965 500cc Ulster Grand Prix. He was also a two-time winner of the North West 200 race in Northern Ireland.

== Motorcycle Grand Prix results ==
**Position**	1	2	3	4	5	6
**Points**	8	6	4	3	2	1

(key) (Races in bold indicate pole position; races in italics indicate fastest lap)

Year	Class	Team	1	2	3	4	5	6	7	8	9	10	Points	Rank	Wins
1964	500cc	Norton	USA -	IOM -	NED -	BEL -	GER -	DDR -	ULS; 2	FIN -	NAT -	JPN -	6	11th	0
1965	500cc	Norton	GER -	IOM -	NED -	BEL -	DDR -	CZE -	ULS; 1	FIN -	NAT -	JPN -	8	6th	1
