= Buddy Parriott =

American motorcycle racer

- Nationality: United States
Motorcycle racing career statistics
Grand Prix motorcycle racing
Active years	1964 - 1965
First race	1964 500cc United States Grand Prix
Last race	1965 500cc United States Grand Prix
Championships	0
Starts / Wins / Podiums / Poles / F. laps / Points; 2 / 0 / 1 / 0 / 0 / 7

Buddy Parriott was an American professional motorcycle road racer. In the 1965 Grand Prix motorcycle racing season, he became the first American rider to finish on the podium in the premier class, when he finished in second place behind Mike Hailwood at the 500cc United States Grand Prix, held at the Daytona International Speedway. Parriott teamed with his son Mike Parriott to ride a Yoshimura Kawasaki to win the 1974 AFM 300 team endurance race held at the Ontario Motor Speedway.
