= Kevin Cass =

Australian motorcycle racer (1938–2015)

- Nationality: (Australia) Australian
- Born: 15 October 1938
- Died: 12 October 2015 (aged 76)
Motorcycle racing career statistics
Grand Prix motorcycle racing
Active years	1965 - 1967
First race	1965 250cc Spanish Grand Prix
Last race	1967 125cc Ulster Grand Prix
Team	Bultaco
Starts / Wins / Podiums / Poles / F. laps / Points; 3 / 0 / 1 / N/A / N/A / 8

Kevin Brian Cass (15 October 1938 – 12 October 2015) was a Grand Prix motorcycle road racer from Australia. He is best known for his motorcycle racing career in the 1960s in both Australia and Europe. He was Australian 125cc Champion in both 1962 and 1963. He raced in Europe at Brands Hatch, the Isle of Man TT and various European Grand Prix events riding both Cotton and Bultaco motorcycles in the 125cc and 250cc classes. Returning to Australia in 1968 with his first wife Virginia, he continued racing and then opened a shop, Kevin Cass Motorcycles in Wollongong, New South Wales.

Also an accomplished mechanical engineer, Cass designed and built numerous championship racing bikes and supported the likes of Peter Stronach, Dave Burgess, Murray Sayle, Warren Willing and the young Wayne Gardner in their racing careers. His bikes had particular success at the Castrol Six Hour race.

In the 1980s, Cass became increasingly involved in the restoration and re-building of vintage motorcycles. Sponsored by Australian Geographic, he re-created the first 1925 circumnavigation of Australia on a motorcycle, a 16,000 km journey which took place on a 1924 Douglas.

Cass lived with his wife Helen in Wollongong where he restored vintage motorcycles. He had three children and four grandchildren. He died at the age of 76 on 12 October 2015.
