= Chris Conn =

British motorcycle racer (1937–2021)

- Nationality: (United Kingdom) British
Motorcycle racing career statistics
Grand Prix motorcycle racing
Active years	1964 – 1967
First race	1964 350cc Ulster Grand Prix
Last race	1967 500cc Dutch TT
Starts / Wins / Podiums / Poles / F. laps / Points; 9 / 0 / 3 / 0 / 0 / 25

Chris Conn (31 December 1937 – 12 February 2021) was a Grand Prix motorcycle road racer. He competed in the FIM motorcycle Grand Prix world championships from 1964 to 1967.

== Motorcycle racing career ==
Conn was born in Portishead, Somerset. His best season was in 1966 when he finished the year in tenth place in the 500cc world championship. In 1966, he won the preseason invitational Mettet Grand Prix.

Conn died from a heart attack in Kinross-shire on 12 February 2021.
