= Fred Stevens =

British motorcycle racer

- Nationality: (United Kingdom) British
Motorcycle racing career statistics
Grand Prix motorcycle racing
Active years	1949, 1961 – 1967
First race	1949 Isle of Man 500cc Senior TT
Last race	1967 500cc Nations Grand Prix
Championships	0
Starts / Wins / Podiums / Poles / F. laps / Points; 31 / 0 / 5 / N/A / N/A / 70

Fred Stevens was a British former Grand Prix motorcycle road racer. His best season was in 1965 when he finished the year in fourth place in the 500cc world championship.

In 1967, Stevens rode an Italian Paton motorcycle to win the 350cc and 500cc races at the North West 200 race in Northern Ireland and, twice finished on the podium at the Isle of Man TT.
