= Derek Minter =

British motorcycle racer

- Minter pictured before his retirement from mainstream motorcycle racing in 1967
- Nationality: British
- Born: 27 April 1932; Ickham, Kent, England
- Died: 2 January 2015 (aged 82)
Motorcycle racing career statistics
Grand Prix motorcycle racing
Active years	1957 – 1960, 1962 – 1965, 1967
First race	1957 500cc Belgian Grand Prix
Last race	1967 500cc Belgian Grand Prix
First win	1962 Isle of Man 250cc Lightweight TT
Last win	1962 Isle of Man 250cc Lightweight TT
Team	Honda
Championships	0
Starts / Wins / Podiums / Poles / F. laps / Points; 25 / 1 / 8 / N/A / N/A / 82

Derek Minter (27 April 1932 – 2 January 2015) was an English Grand Prix motorcycle and short-circuit road racer. Born in Ickham, Kent, with education starting in nearby Littlebourne, he was versatile rider who rode a variety of machinery between 1955 and 1967 at increasing levels of expertise and in varying capacities and classes.

Minter's best season was in 1958 when he finished the year in fifth place in the 500 cc World Championship. In 1960, he won the North West 200 race in Northern Ireland. In 1962, he won the Isle of Man 250 cc Lightweight TT.

== The early days ==
Minter was born in the small village of Ickham and attended Littlebourne Primary School, followed by Sturry Central secondary school in Sturry village. He learned to grow fruit and vegetables on the school allotments, and also worked on a local fruit farm during his school holidays.

Minter started his working life as an apprentice electrician at a coach company but worked evenings and weekends as a farm labourer to earn the extra money needed to buy his first bike in 1948, a 350 cc BSA which he also used for trials riding.

After National Service in the Royal Air Force, Minter worked for motorcycle dealer Ray Hallet at Hallets of Canterbury. Hallet had been a road race and grass track rider and Minter accompanied him to the Isle of Man as his mechanic for the Manx Grand Prix. Hallet provided Minter with a CB34 500 cc BSA Gold Star which was prepared for racing and stripped of unnecessary weight, but retained the standard, roadster-based equipment and had no race fairing.

Minter raced the Gold Star in 1955, initially entering non-expert races then progressing to expert races where the competition rode Manx Nortons and Matchless G45s. His performances in 1956 impressed Ron Harris, MV Agusta importer and proprietor of Wincheap Garages, who employed Minter as a car mechanic, and created a team providing Minter with 350 cc and 500 cc Manx Nortons.

== The middle years ==
Minter's success continued with Steve Lancefield preparing his engines until 1960, when he became the first rider to lap of the Isle of Man TT course at over 100 mph on a single cylinder machine. This led to other rides with Bianchi, Moto Morini and MZ.

After 1961, Ray Petty from Farnborough, Hampshire, prepared the Norton engines. In 1962, Minter won the 250 cc TT on a Honda 4 provided by importers Honda Ltd. Also in 1962, he rode a Norton to win the prestigious Mallory Park Race of the Year. Over the years, he realised that riding in local events as a 'guest' rider for several teams earned him more money than being tied to a factory team.

For the 1963 season, Minter signed to ride in Championship races for Geoff Duke's Scuderia Gilera team (also known as Scuderia Duke) with new team mate John Hartle, whilst planning to continue riding Nortons in home short circuit races.

The new team were to use older 1950s Gileras on which former World Champion rider Duke had much success, but which with the newer, upgraded tyre technology of the 1960s were considered still competitive. The team was devised by Duke to challenge the domination of Mike Hailwood on the MV, and had early successes at Silverstone and Brands Hatch in the UK, and Imola in Italy.

In May 1963, whilst riding a 500 cc Manx Norton at Brands Hatch, Kent, Minter was involved in a battle for the lead with Dunstall Norton rider Dave Downer on a 650 cc Norton Dominator twin. During a last lap accident, Minter suffered serious injuries and Downer died.

Minter's place in the Gilera team had been taken temporarily by up and coming rider Phil Read. When contesting June's Isle of Man TT, the team claimed second (Hartle) and third (Read) to Mike Hailwood's MV Agusta, At the Dutch TT at Assen they took first (Hartle) and second (Read), with Hailwood's MV retiring.

Minter soon recovered from his injuries, riding at Oulton Park then reclaiming his team place for the Dundrod Ulster GP in August, where Gilera again scored second (Hartle) and third (Minter) to Hailwood's MV. In the East German GP Minter was second to Hailwood. The Scuderia Duke team was disbanded at the end of 1963

== The final years ==
Minter went on to achieve many more wins on Manx Nortons, a 250 cc Cotton Telstar, and for 1966 Seeley 350s and 500s. Midway through the season he changed bikes to again ride Nortons, fettled by Petty and entered by his old associates at Hallets of Cantebury.

Minter retired as a professional road-racer in 1967. After retirement from racing, he was involved in road transport industry, operating as an owner/driver of an articulated unit, often delivering unaccompanied trailers from the Europe routed through the Dover ferry terminal, near his home in Kent, to destinations throughout the UK.

In the 1990s, Minter returned to the tracks to ride Summerfield Manx machines in leisure classic events until an accident at Darley Moor in 2000 finally ended his sport-riding career. He died in 2015.

== Legacy ==
Minter was one of the first riders to wear coloured racing leathers, using a green suit during the 1966 season, and he regularly featured in Lewis Leathers advertising during the 1960s.

At Brands Hatch racing circuit, the Portobello Straight was renamed Derek Minter Straight. So successful and popular was Minter at Brands Hatch that commentator Murray Walker referred to him as "The King of Brands", an unofficial title which later became the name of an actual competitive meeting at the circuit.
