= Endel Kiisa =

Estonian motorcycle racer (1937–2024)

Endel Kiisa (1 October 1937 – 13 May 2024) was an Estonian motorcycle racer.

== Biography ==
Kiisa was born in Käina, Hiiu County. In 1974 he graduated from Tallinn Pedagogical Institute's Faculty of Physical Education.

Kiisa began his motorsport career in 1953, coached by Feliks Lepik. In 1968, he won the bronze medal at Imatra Circuit. In 1962, he won the Soviet Union championships. He was a 23-time Estonian champion in different motorcycling disciplines.

Kiisa died on 13 May 2024, at the age of 86.

== Awards ==
- 2001: best motorcycle racer of 20th century of Estonia
- 2020: was chosen to Hall of Fame of Estonian motorsport (Estonian: Eesti mootorispordi kuulsuste koda)
