= Bianchi (motorcycles) =

Italian motorcycle brand

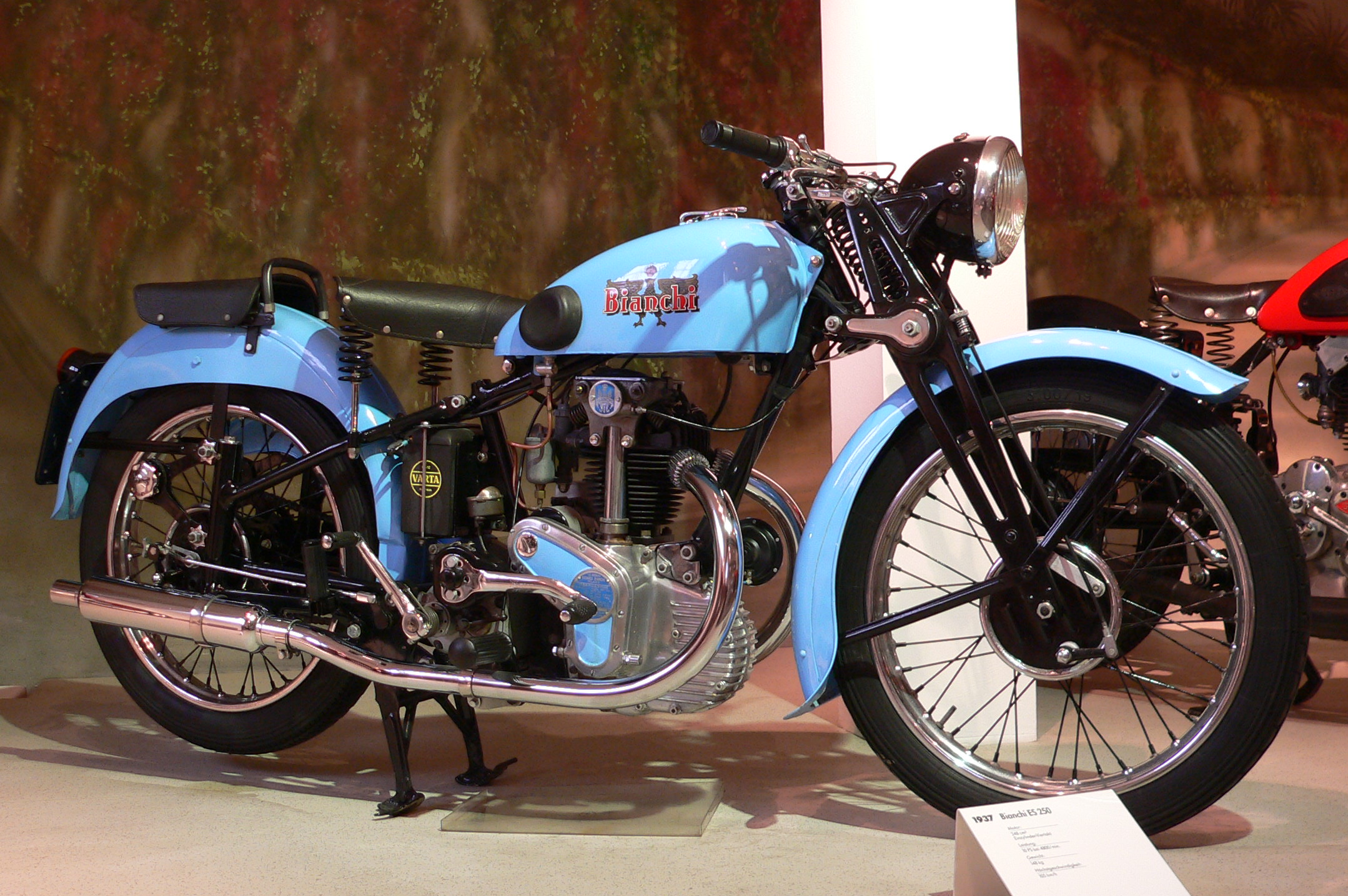
Bianchi ES 250 of 1937

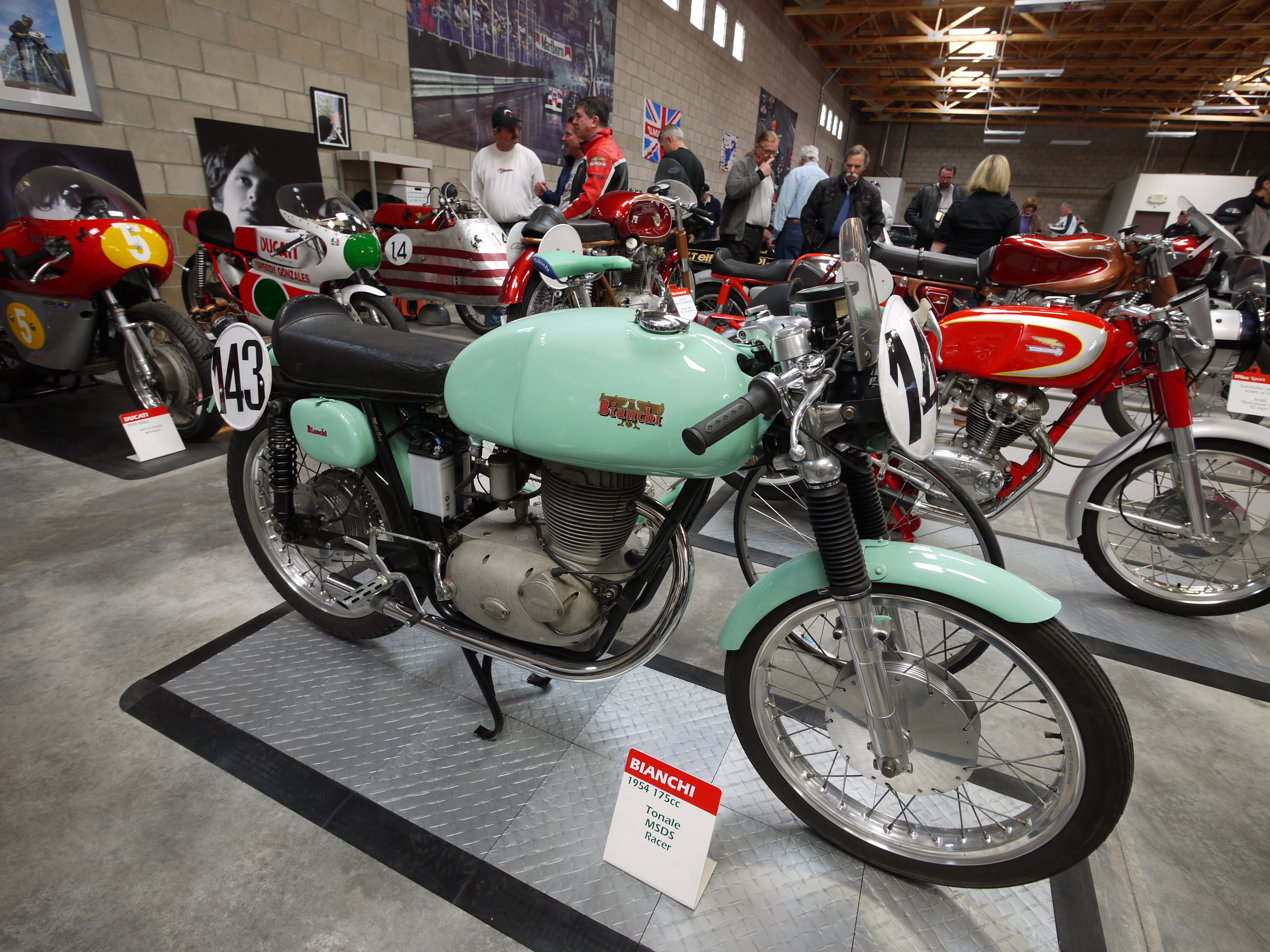
Bianchi Tonale Corsa 175cc of 1954

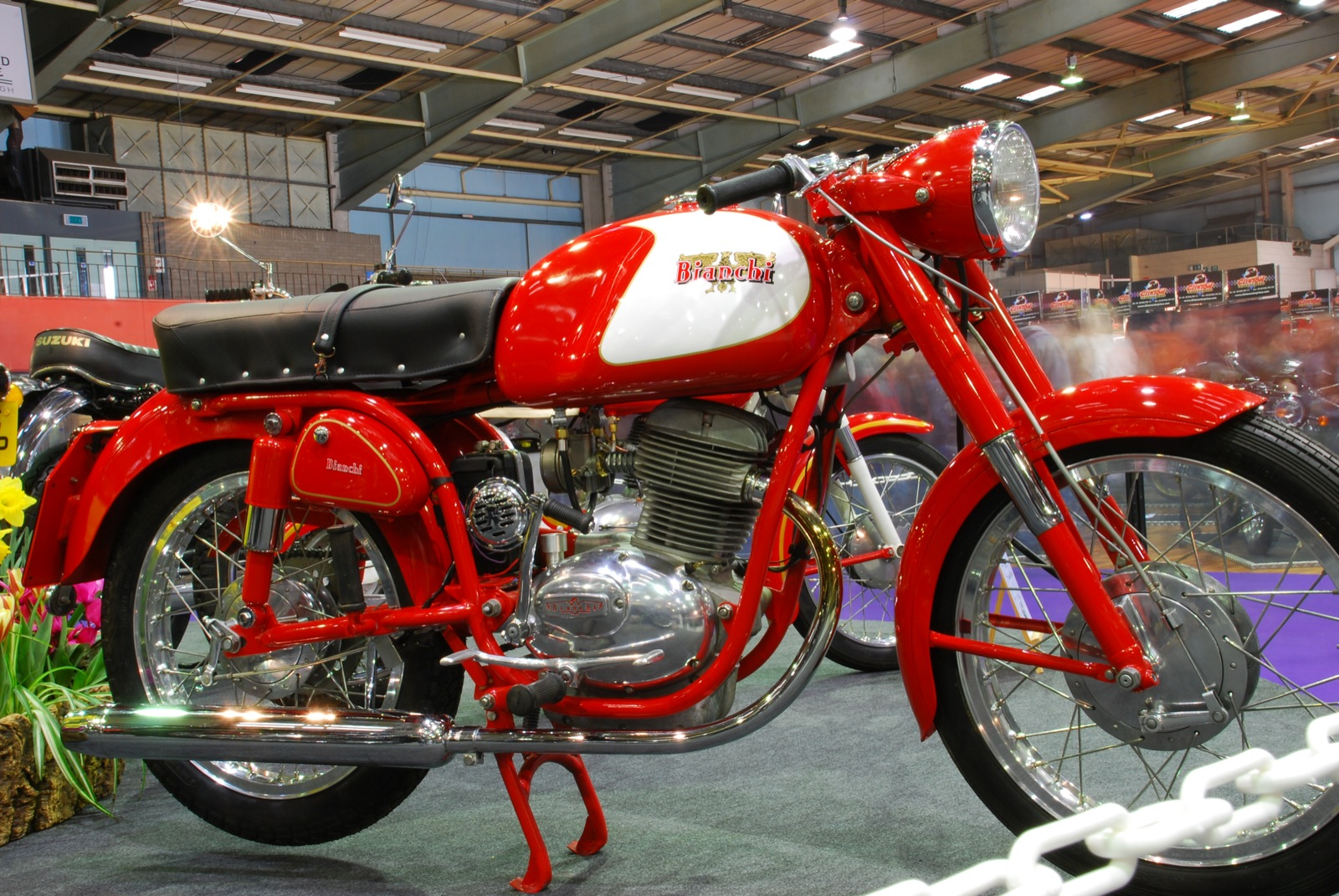
Bianchi Bernina 125cc of 1960

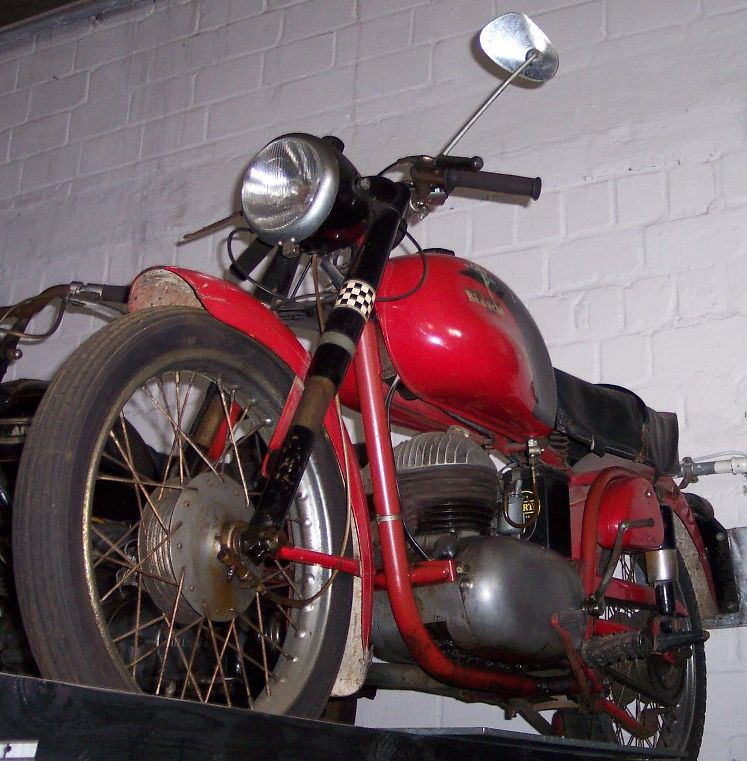
Bianchi Mendola 125cc of 1960

Bianchi was a brand of Italian motorcycle made from 1897 to 1967 by F.I.V. Edoardo Bianchi S.p.A. The company also produced automobiles from 1900 to 1939, and today is a major Italian bicycle manufacturer. Edoardo Bianchi started his bicycle manufacturing business in a small shop on Milan's Via Nirone in 1885. Bianchi was a prominent name in the motorcycle racing world from 1925 to 1930.

== Early history ==
Edoardo Bianchi was an Italian motorcycling pioneer who began by building bicycles in 1885. He built a motorised bicycle in 1897, and a car in 1900. In 1903 he fitted engines in the centre of strengthened bicycle frames, and by 1905 also fitted Truffault leading link forks. In 1910 Bianchi built a 498 cc single that was very successful and established the Bianchi motorcycle name.

In 1916 a 650 cc V-twin was made, which was enlarged to 741 cc in 1920. In 1921 a smaller 598 cc V-twin, and a new 498 cc single with all chain drive was released. There was a 348 cc side valve single for 1923, and V-twins of 498 cc and 598 cc. In 1924 a 173 cc overhead valve single was added to the range.

During WWII Bianchi supported Mussolini's desire that the Italian economy should be self-sufficient by developing a 250 cc model named Freccia d'Oro S in 1937. In return his firm received contracts to supply the Italian military. The Freccio D'Oro was seen as a replacement of the 220 cc model.

Therefore, the marque launched the 250 Freccia d'Oro ("Golden Arrow") in 1934 to replace the 220 of 1933, which was in turn derived from the 175 launched in 1930. Two version were offered, a touring model at 3800 lire (designated by a "T" suffix) and sport model for 3950 lire (designated by a "T" suffix) that offered 2.5 more horsepower and twin exhausts. The model was manufactured from 1934 until 1940 and sales benefited from government subsidies that reduced the sale price to the customer.

== Racing History ==
In 1925 a 348 cc overhead valve (OHV) single was introduced. There was also a 348 cc dual overhead cam (DOHC) works racer, designed by Albino Baldi, Bianchi chief engineer, and these were the most successful Italian racing bikes for the next five years. During this time the bike was ridden by such riders as Tazio Nuvolari, Amilcare Moretti, Mario Ghersi, Karl Kodric, Gino Zanchetta and Luigi Arcangeli.

In the 1930s Baldi designed a 498cc ohc single racing bike, which was ridden by such riders as Giordano Aldrighetti, Aldo Pigarini, Terzo Bandini, Dorino Serafini, Guido Cerato and Alberto Ascari. In 1938 a supercharged four cylinder 498 cc DOHC racer was built, but was never fully developed.

=== European championships ===
Year	Champion	Motorcycle
1925	(Kingdom of Italy) Tazio Nuvolari	

== Post war ==
After World War II Bianchi produced 123 cc and 248 cc ohc single racers, and in the late 1950s released new 248 cc and 348 cc dohc twins, designed by Colombo and Lino Tonti. A few 348 cc engines were over-bored to 498 cc to produce works versions for the 500 cc class races. In 1946 Edoardo died, and control of the firm passed to his son Giuseppe.

Bianchi production motorcycles included 49cc models, the 75 Gardena, 122 and 173cc two strokes, the 4-stroke 125cc Bianchi Bernina LV, and the Bianchi Tonale, a 173 cc chain driven ohc single. Some 49 cc two stroke engines were built under licence from Puch, and fitted into the innovative Falco, one or two seat moped. This sprightly ride featured a one-piece pressed girder frame and three speed gearbox operated via the left hand twist grip and clutch lever. In 1961, Bob McIntyre rode a Bianchi 350 cc in the Motorcycle Grand Prix World Championships. Motorcycle production ceased in 1967, when all rights passed to Innocenti. Small mopeds made by Bianchi were imported by American retailer Montgomery Ward and sold via catalog under the Riverside captive import brand.

== See also ==
- Autobianchi (1955 - 1995)
- Bianchi (company) (1885 – present)
- List of motorcycles of the 1910s
- List of motorcycles of the 1920s
