= 1964 Isle of Man TT =

Series of motorcycle races held in 1964 on the Isle of Man

The 1964 Isle of Man TT motorcycle races were contested in six categories over the Snaefell Mountain Course. The Senior TT was won by Mike Hailwood on an MV Agusta.

== 1964 Isle of Man Lightweight TT 125cc final standings ==
3 Laps (113.00 Miles) Mountain Course.

| Place | Rider | Number | Country | Machine | Speed | Time | Points |
|---|---|---|---|---|---|---|---|
| 1 | (Switzerland) Luigi Taveri | | Switzerland | Honda | 92.14 mph | 1:13.43.0 | 8 |
| 2 | (Rhodesia) Jim Redman | | Rhodesia | Honda | 92.08 mph | 1:13.46.0 | 6 |
| 3 | (Northern Ireland) Ralph Bryans | | United Kingdom | Honda | 91.22 mph | 1:14.28.2 | 4 |
| 4 | (Czechoslovakia) Stanislav Malina | | Czechoslovakia | ČZ | 85.16 mph | 1:19.45.4 | 3 |
| 5 | (West Germany) Walter Scheimann | | West Germany | Honda | 83.24 mph | 1:21.36.0 | 2 |
| 6 | (Rhodesia) Bruce Beale | | Rhodesia | Honda | 82.69 mph | 1:22.08.8 | 1 |

== 1964 Sidecar TT final standings ==
3 Laps (113.00 Miles) Mountain Course.

| Place | Rider | Number | Country | Machine | Speed | Time | Points |
|---|---|---|---|---|---|---|---|
| 1 | (West Germany) Max Deubel/Emil Horner | | West Germany | BMW | 89.12 mph | 1:16.13.0 | 8 |
| 2 | (United Kingdom) Colin Seeley/W.Rawlings | | United Kingdom | FCSB | 86.76 mph | 1:18.17.6 | 6 |
| 3 | (West Germany) Georg Auerbacher | | West Germany | BMW | 84.45 mph | 1:20.26.2 | 4 |
| 4 | (West Germany) Arseneus Butscher | | West Germany | BMW | 83.53 mph | 1:21.19.0 | 3 |
| 5 | (United Kingdom) Tony Baitup / G Geer | | United Kingdom | Triumph | 79.01 mph | 1:25.58.0 | 2 |
| 6 | (United Kingdom) Terry Vinicombe | | United Kingdom | Triumph | 78.94 mph | 1:26.02.8 | 1 |

== 1964 Isle of Man Lightweight TT 250cc final standings ==
6 Laps (226.38 Miles) Mountain Course.

| Place | Rider | Number | Country | Machine | Speed | Time | Points |
|---|---|---|---|---|---|---|---|
| 1 | (Rhodesia) Jim Redman | | Rhodesia | Honda | 97.45 mph | 2:19.23.6 | 8 |
| 2 | (United Kingdom) Alan Shepherd | | United Kingdom | MZ | 96.97 mph | 2:20.04.6 | 6 |
| 3 | (Italy) Alberto Pagani | | Italy | Paton | 86.20 mph | 2:37.35.8 | 4 |
| 4 | (Czechoslovakia) Stanislav Malina | | Czechoslovakia | ČZ | 85.51 mph | 2:38.52.8 | 3 |
| 5 | (United Kingdom) Roy Boughey | | United Kingdom | Yamaha | 80.06 mph | 2:49.40.6 | 2 |
| 6 | (United Kingdom) C.W.Hunt | | United Kingdom | Aermacchi | 79.25 mph | 2:51.24.2 | 1 |

== 1964 Isle of Man Junior TT 350cc final standings ==
6 Laps (236.38 Miles) Mountain Course.

| Place | Rider | Number | Country | Machine | Speed | Time | Points |
|---|---|---|---|---|---|---|---|
| 1 | (Rhodesia) Jim Redman | | Rhodesia | Honda | 98.51 mph | 2:17.55.4 | 8 |
| 2 | (United Kingdom) Phil Read | | United Kingdom | AJS | 93.58 mph | 2:25.00.6 | 6 |
| 3 | (Canada) Mike Duff | | Canada | AJS | 93.46 mph | 2:25.21.4 | 4 |
| 4 | (United Kingdom) Derek Minter | | United Kingdom | Norton | 93.17 mph | 2:25.48.2 | 3 |
| 5 | (United Kingdom) Derek Woodman | | United Kingdom | AJS | 92.02 mph | 2:27.37.6 | 2 |
| 6 | (United Kingdom) Joe Dunphy | | United Kingdom | AJS | 91.43 mph | 2:28.34.6 | 1 |

== 1964 50cc Ultra-Lightweight TT final standings ==
3 Laps (113.00 Miles) Mountain Course.

| Place | Rider | Number | Country | Machine | Speed | Time | Points |
|---|---|---|---|---|---|---|---|
| 1 | (New Zealand) Hugh Anderson | | New Zealand | Suzuki | 80.64 mph | 1:24.13.4 | 8 |
| 2 | (United Kingdom) Ralph Bryans | | United Kingdom | Honda | 79.68 mph | 1:25.14.8 | 6 |
| 3 | (Japan) Isao Morishita | | Japan | Suzuki | 79.67 mph | 1:25.15.4 | 4 |
| 4 | (West Germany) Hans-Georg Anscheidt | | West Germany | Kreidler | 79.63 mph | 1:25.18.0 | 3 |
| 5 | (Japan) Mitsuo Itoh | | Japan | Suzuki | 79.57 mph | 1:25.22.4 | 2 |
| 6 | (Japan) Naomi Taniguchi | | Japan | Honda | 79.39 mph | 1:25.33.0 | 1 |

- Fastest Lap; Ernst Degner 28 minutes 37.2 seconds, 79.10 mph.

== 1964 Isle of Man Senior TT 500cc final standings ==
6 Laps (236.38 Miles) Mountain Course.

| Place | Rider | Number | Country | Machine | Speed | Time | Points |
|---|---|---|---|---|---|---|---|
| 1 | (United Kingdom) Mike Hailwood | | United Kingdom | MV Agusta | 100.95 mph | 2:14.33.8 | 8 |
| 2 | (United Kingdom) Derek Minter | | United Kingdom | Norton | 98.47 mph | 2:17.56.6 | 6 |
| 3 | (United Kingdom) Fred Stevens | | United Kingdom | Matchless | 96.40 mph | 2:20.54.6 | 4 |
| 4 | (United Kingdom) Derek Woodman | | United Kingdom | Matchless | 96.28 mph | 2:21.05.6 | 3 |
| 5 | (United Kingdom) Griff A.Jenkins | | United Kingdom | Norton | 94.95 mph | 2:23.04.4 | 2 |
| 6 | (United Kingdom) Billy McCosh | | United Kingdom | Matchless | 94.84 mph | 2:23.14.4 | 1 |
