= German motorcycle Grand Prix =

Annual motorcycle race

German Grand Prix

Grand Prix motorcycle racing
- Venue: Sachsenring (1998–2019, 2021–present); Nürburgring (1955, 1958, 1965, 1968, 1970, 1972, 1974, 1976, 1978, 1980, 1984, 1986, 1988, 1990, 1995–1997); Hockenheimring (1957, 1959, 1961, 1963, 1967–1968, 1969, 1971, 1973, 1975, 1977, 1979, 1981–1983, 1985, 1987, 1989, 1991–1994); Solitudering (1952, 1954, 1956, 1960, 1962, 1964); Schottenring (1953)
- First race: 1952
- Most wins (rider): Giacomo Agostini, Marc Márquez (13)
- Most wins (manufacturer): Honda (61)

The German motorcycle Grand Prix, first held in 1925, is a motorcycling event that is part of the FIM Grand Prix motorcycle racing season. The event is due to take place at the Sachsenring until at least 2031.

== History ==
The first two Großer Preis von Deutschland races were held at Berlin's AVUS before moving to the new the purpose-built Nürburgring which was used in its full 28 km configuration. No Grand Prix was held in 1932, in 1933 the AVUS was given another try, and since 1934, public roads near and through Hohenstein-Ernstthal in Saxony were in use, initially without the name Sachsenring which had been used elsewhere. It was adopted in 1937.

After the war, in 1949, two German states were founded, and the FIM introduced a motorcycle World Championship in which neither Germans nor German race tracks could participate due to still being banned. In the (Western) Federal Republic of Germany, a strong motorcycle industry (NSU, DKW etc.) emerged in the early 1950s, as cars were not yet affordable. With the Sachsenring being now in the (Eastern) German Democratic Republic (GDR), a new venue had to be selected. The Nürburgring was damaged and due to its length not very suitable.

In 1952, the Solitudering near Stuttgart was chosen as the site of the first FIM Grand Prix race on German soil since the end of the Second World War. The Grand Prix race offered people a moment of respite in war ravaged Germany and, an estimated crowd of 400,000 spectators witnessed Reg Armstrong win both the 350 and 500 cc races for the Norton factory. The attendance is considered to be one of the largest ever to watch a Motorcycle Grand Prix. Although the crowds were large, the narrow roads had to be widened.

In 1953, the Schottenring near Fulda was chosen, but due to lack of safety, it was partially boycotted, and only the small classes races had World Championship status. Attendance at the Nürburgring, which was by now used in its 22.8 km Nordschleife configuration, was disappointing. Former DKW and NSU factory rider and world record setter Wilhelm Herz promoted the Hockenheimring successfully. Thus, with Hockenheim (in odd-numbered years) and Solitude, two tracks in the southwestern state of Baden-Württemberg shared the German GP until the mid-1960s, when the Solitude was abandoned and replaced by the Nürburgring. There, the lesser known 7.7 km Südschleife was used twice, as in the Eifelrennen races which often attracted international entrants, but that part of the track was not rebuilt in 1970/71; thus in the even years from 1970 to 1980, the famous Nordschleife was used.

At that time, the "Grand Prix of the GDR", held on the Sachsenring, was part of the World Championship from 1961 to 1972. It is referred to as East German GP, EGER for short on the MotoGP website. During that period the German Grand Prix was also referred to as West German Grand Prix (WGER), even though its name never changed.

The popularity of motorcycles sharply fell in late 1950s Germany, as now everyone aspired to get an automobile. Only BMW survived, dominating side car racing. The East German brand MZ had made groundbreaking progress in two stroke technology, but due to defecting personnel and other problems, they fell behind in the late 1960s. After West German Dieter Braun won the East German race on the Sachsenring in 1971, the crowd sang the (West) German anthem, the "Deutschlandlied". To prevent further "demonstrations", the East German politicians, otherwise eager to gain international recognition, sacrificed the event's World Championship status, limiting the entry of riders from Western states from 1972 onwards. With mainly riders from other Eastern bloc socialist states taking part, it was still called Großer Preis der DDR until 1977, when it was renamed Großer Preis des ADMV der DDR after the motorsports governing body.

In 1974, the event on the improved Nürburgring Nordschleife was boycotted by championship contenders as the track had not been fitted with enough straw bales. Traditionally, the Eifelrennen hosted motorcycle and automobile racing on the same weekend. Safety demands became problematic, as drivers asked for armco and catch fences, while rider safety requires unobstructed surroundings, with walls of straw bales in front of obstacles. With Agostini and others holding out, German amateur riders took all wins; Edmund Czihak's win in the 500cc class remains the only race won by a German rider in the premier class (both in the 500cc era and the MotoGP era). The Eifelrennen in spring became an automobile event, and the GP became a separate event in August.

A few years later, in 1980, the last German GP was held on the Nordschleife, with the new GP track taking over in 1984.

The additional 1986 Baden-Württemberg Grand Prix (at Hockenheim) counted towards the WC only for 80cc and 125cc classes.

In 1998, after having become rather unpopular first at Hockenheim and then at Nürburgring due to the style of the promoters, the German motorcycle Grand Prix moved to new promoters, and to the shortened purpose-built Sachsenring where it became a sell-out event since.

The 2020 race was cancelled due to the outbreak of COVID-19.

== Official names and sponsors ==
The names that are included are from both West and East Germany.

- 1952–1956, 1958, 1964–1988, 1990: Großer Preis von Deutschland (no official sponsor, West Germany)
- 1959: Intern. Rhein-Pokal (no official sponsor, West Germany)
- 1962–1972: Großer Preis der Deutschen Demokratischen Republik (no official sponsor, East Germany)
- 1989, 1991: Großer Preis von Deutschland für Motorräder (no official sponsor, West Germany until 1990)
- 1992: Großer Preis von Deutschland Motorräder (no official sponsor)
- 1993: Grand Prix von Deutschland (no official sponsor)
- 1994–1995: Grand Prix Deutschland (no official sponsor)
- 1996: Warsteiner Motorrad Grand Prix Deutschland
- 1997: ADAC Motorrad Grand Prix Deutschland
- 1998–1999: Polini Motorrad Grand Prix Deutschland
- 2000–2003: Cinzano Motorrad Grand Prix Deutschland
- 2004: Veltins Motorrad Grand Prix Deutschland
- 2005, 2007–2009: Alice Motorrad Grand Prix Deutschland
- 2006: betandwin.com Grand Prix Deutschland
- 2010–2014: eni Motorrad Grand Prix Deutschland
- 2015–2017: GoPro Motorrad Grand Prix Deutschland
- 2018: Pramac Motorrad Grand Prix Deutschland
- 2019: HJC Helmets Motorrad Grand Prix Deutschland
- 2021–2024: Liqui Moly Motorrad Grand Prix Deutschland
- 2025–present: Liqui Moly Grand Prix of Germany

== Spectator attendance ==
2025: 256,441

== Track gallery ==
Avus, used in 1925–1926 and 1933

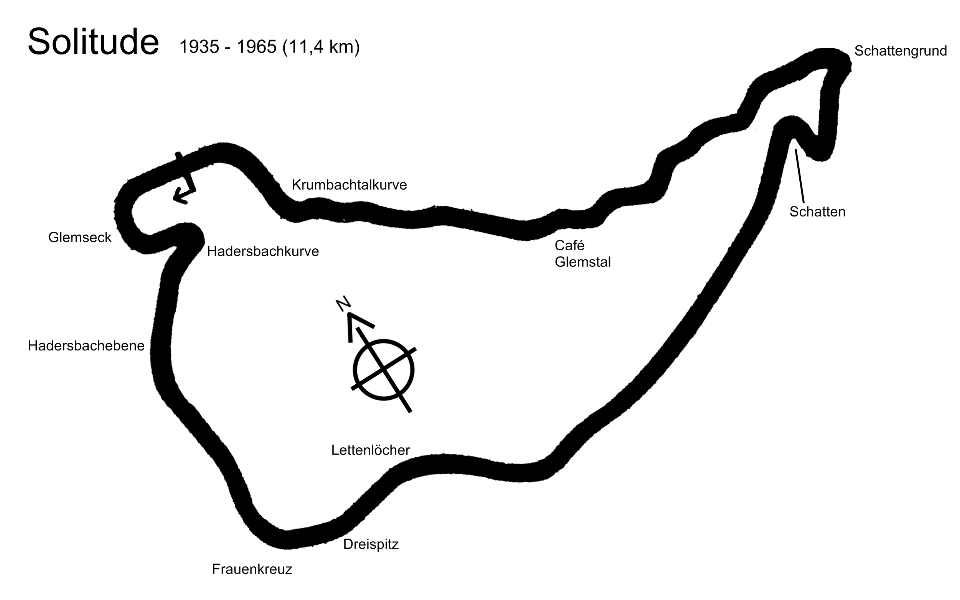
Solitudering, as used from 1935 to 1965

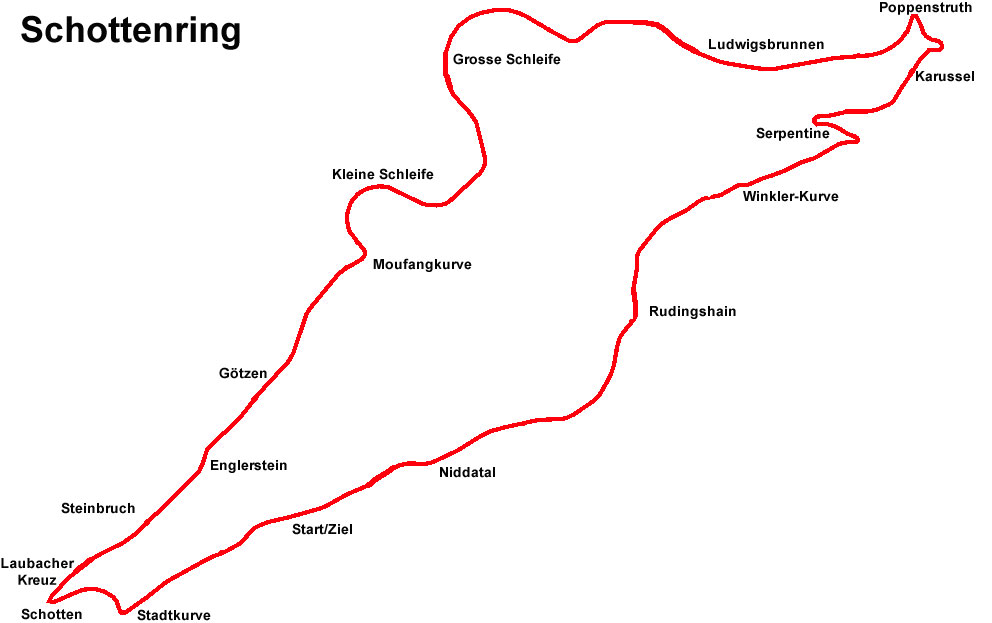
Schottenring, used in 1953

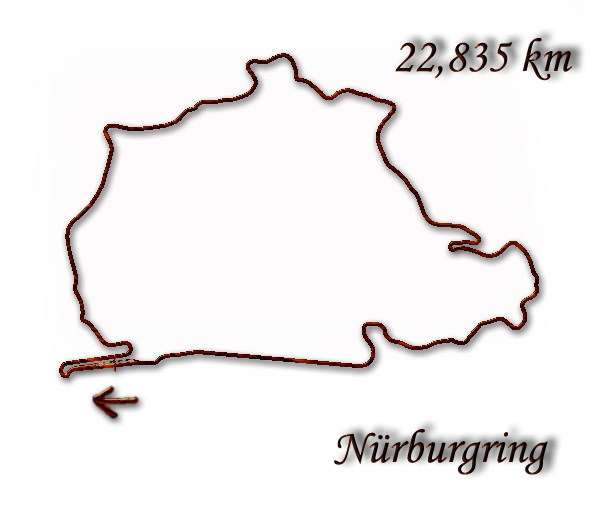
Nürburgring Nordschleife, as used until 1980

Nürburgring Südschleife, used in 1965 and 1968

Nürburgring Grand Prix track, 1984–1997

Hockenheimring as used until 1994

Sachsenring, used since 1998, layout since 2002

== Winners of the German motorcycle Grand Prix ==
=== Multiple winners (riders) ===
# Wins	Rider	Wins	
# Wins	Rider	Category	Years won
13	(Italy) Giacomo Agostini	500cc	1967, 1968, 1969, 1970, 1971, 1972, 1975, 1976
13	(Italy) Giacomo Agostini	350cc	1965, 1968, 1969, 1970, 1971
13	(Spain) Marc Márquez	MotoGP	2013, 2014, 2015, 2016, 2017, 2018, 2019, 2021, 2025, 2026
13	(Spain) Marc Márquez	Moto2	2011, 2012
13	(Spain) Marc Márquez	125cc	2010
8	(Italy) Carlo Ubbiali	250cc	1956, 1957, 1959
8	(Italy) Carlo Ubbiali	125cc	1953, 1955, 1957, 1958, 1959
8	(Spain) Ángel Nieto	125cc	1978, 1979, 1981, 1983, 1984
8	(Spain) Ángel Nieto	50cc	1970, 1975, 1976
6	(Italy) Valentino Rossi	MotoGP	2002, 2005, 2006, 2009
6	(Italy) Valentino Rossi	250cc	1999
6	(Italy) Valentino Rossi	125cc	1997
6	(Spain) Dani Pedrosa	MotoGP	2007, 2010, 2011, 2012
6	(Spain) Dani Pedrosa	250cc	2004, 2005
5	(United Kingdom) John Surtees	500cc	1958, 1959, 1960
5	(United Kingdom) John Surtees	350cc	1958, 1959
5	(Rhodesia) Jim Redman	500cc	1966
5	(Rhodesia) Jim Redman	350cc	1963, 1964
5	(Rhodesia) Jim Redman	250cc	1962
5	(Rhodesia) Jim Redman	125cc	1964
5	(United Kingdom) Mike Hailwood	500cc	1964, 1965
5	(United Kingdom) Mike Hailwood	350cc	1966, 1967
5	(United Kingdom) Mike Hailwood	250cc	1966
5	(United Kingdom) Phil Read	500cc	1973
5	(United Kingdom) Phil Read	250cc	1964, 1965, 1971
5	(United Kingdom) Phil Read	125cc	1968
5	(Switzerland) Stefan Dörflinger	80cc	1984, 1985
5	(Switzerland) Stefan Dörflinger	50cc	1980, 1981, 1983
5	(West Germany) Anton Mang	350cc	1981
5	(West Germany) Anton Mang	250cc	1981, 1982, 1987
5	(West Germany) Anton Mang	125cc	1976
4	(Australia) Mick Doohan	500cc	1992, 1994, 1997, 1998
3	(West Germany) Werner Haas	250cc	1953, 1954
3	(West Germany) Werner Haas	125cc	1952
3	(Republic of Ireland) Reg Armstrong	500cc	1952, 1956
3	(Republic of Ireland) Reg Armstrong	350cc	1952
3	(West Germany) Ernst Degner	125cc	1961, 1963
3	(West Germany) Ernst Degner	50cc	1962
3	(United Kingdom) Ralph Bryans	250cc	1967
3	(United Kingdom) Ralph Bryans	50cc	1964, 1965
3	(West Germany) Hans-Georg Anscheidt	50cc	1966, 1967, 1968
3	(Italy) Walter Villa	350cc	1976
3	(Italy) Walter Villa	250cc	1975, 1976
3	(South Africa) Kork Ballington	250cc	1978, 1979, 1980
3	(France) Christian Sarron	500cc	1985
3	(France) Christian Sarron	250cc	1977, 1984
3	(United States) Kevin Schwantz	500cc	1988, 1990, 1991
3	(Italy) Luca Cadalora	500cc	1996
3	(Italy) Luca Cadalora	250cc	1988
3	(Italy) Luca Cadalora	125cc	1986
3	(Italy) Marco Melandri	250cc	2001, 2002
3	(Italy) Marco Melandri	125cc	1999
3	(Italy) Max Biaggi	MotoGP	2004
3	(Italy) Max Biaggi	500cc	2001
3	(Italy) Max Biaggi	250cc	1995
3	(Spain) Héctor Garzó	MotoE	2023 Race 2, 2024 Race 1, 2024 Race 2
2	(United Kingdom) Geoff Duke	350cc	1954, 1955
2	(United Kingdom) Bill Lomas	350cc	1955, 1956
2	(Italy) Libero Liberati	500cc	1957
2	(Italy) Libero Liberati	350cc	1957
2	(Federation of Rhodesia and Nyasaland) Gary Hocking	500cc	1961
2	(Federation of Rhodesia and Nyasaland) Gary Hocking	250cc	1960
2	(Italy) Tarquinio Provini	250cc	1958, 1963
2	(New Zealand) Hugh Anderson	125cc	1965
2	(New Zealand) Hugh Anderson	50cc	1963
2	(Switzerland) Luigi Taveri	125cc	1962, 1966
2	(United Kingdom) Dave Simmonds	125cc	1969, 1971
2	(Netherlands) Jan de Vries	50cc	1971, 1972
2	(Finland) Jarno Saarinen	350cc	1972
2	(Finland) Jarno Saarinen	250cc	1973
2	(Sweden) Kent Andersson	250cc	1969
2	(Sweden) Kent Andersson	125cc	1973
2	(West Germany) Helmut Kassner	350cc	1974
2	(West Germany) Helmut Kassner	250cc	1974
2	(Japan) Takazumi Katayama	350cc	1977, 1978
2	(South Africa) Jon Ekerold	350cc	1979, 1980
2	(United States) Kenny Roberts	500cc	1981, 1983
2	(Venezuela) Carlos Lavado	250cc	1983, 1986
2	(West Germany) Gerhard Waibel	80cc	1987
2	(West Germany) Gerhard Waibel	50cc	1979
2	(United States) Eddie Lawson	500cc	1986, 1987
2	(Italy) Doriano Romboni	250cc	1993
2	(Italy) Doriano Romboni	125cc	1990
2	(Germany) Dirk Raudies	125cc	1993, 1994
2	(Australia) Daryl Beattie	500cc	1993, 1995
2	(Germany) Ralf Waldmann	250cc	1996
2	(Germany) Ralf Waldmann	125cc	1991
2	(Japan) Tetsuya Harada	250cc	1997, 1998
2	(Italy) Marco Simoncelli	250cc	2008, 2009
2	(Spain) Jordi Torres	Moto2	2013
2	(Spain) Jordi Torres	MotoE	2023 Race 1
2	(Spain) Pedro Acosta	Moto2	2023
2	(Spain) Pedro Acosta	Moto3	2021
2	(Spain) Jorge Martín	MotoGP	2023
2	(Spain) Jorge Martín	Moto3	2018

=== Multiple winners (manufacturers) ===
# Wins	Manufacturer	Wins	
# Wins	Manufacturer	Category	Years won
61	(Japan) Honda	MotoGP	2002, 2003, 2004, 2007, 2010, 2011, 2012, 2013, 2014, 2015, 2016, 2017, 2018, 2019, 2021
61	(Japan) Honda	500cc	1966, 1984, 1992, 1993, 1994, 1996, 1997, 1998, 2000
61	(Japan) Honda	350cc	1963, 1964, 1966, 1967
61	(Japan) Honda	250cc	1961, 1962, 1966, 1967, 1987, 1989, 1990, 1991, 1993, 1994, 1996, 2003, 2004, 2005, 2006
61	(Japan) Honda	Moto3	2015, 2016, 2017, 2018, 2019
61	(Japan) Honda	125cc	1962, 1964, 1966, 1988, 1990, 1991, 1993, 1994, 1995, 1998, 1999
61	(Japan) Honda	50cc	1964, 1965
40	(Japan) Yamaha	MotoGP	2005, 2006, 2009, 2022
40	(Japan) Yamaha	500cc	1974, 1975, 1981, 1983, 1985, 1986, 1987, 1989, 2001
40	(Japan) Yamaha	350cc	1972, 1973, 1974, 1975, 1977, 1978, 1979, 1980, 1982
40	(Japan) Yamaha	250cc	1964, 1965, 1968, 1969, 1970, 1971, 1972, 1973, 1974, 1977, 1983, 1984, 1985, 1986, 1988, 2000
40	(Japan) Yamaha	125cc	1968, 1973
31	(Italy) MV Agusta	500cc	1958, 1959, 1960, 1961, 1964, 1965, 1967, 1968, 1969, 1970, 1971, 1972, 1973, 1976
31	(Italy) MV Agusta	350cc	1958, 1959, 1965, 1968, 1969, 1970, 1971
31	(Italy) MV Agusta	250cc	1956, 1957, 1958, 1959, 1960
31	(Italy) MV Agusta	125cc	1953, 1955, 1957, 1958, 1959
18	(Japan) Suzuki	500cc	1977, 1978, 1979, 1980, 1982, 1988, 1990, 1991, 1995, 1999
18	(Japan) Suzuki	125cc	1963, 1965, 1967
18	(Japan) Suzuki	50cc	1962, 1963, 1966, 1967, 1968
18	(Italy) Aprilia	250cc	1992, 1995, 1997, 1998, 1999, 2001, 2002
18	(Italy) Aprilia	125cc	1992, 1996, 1997, 2001, 2002, 2003, 2004, 2006, 2007, 2009, 2011
10	(Austria) KTM	Moto2	2018
10	(Austria) KTM	250cc	2007
10	(Austria) KTM	Moto3	2012, 2013, 2014, 2021, 2023, 2025, 2026
10	(Austria) KTM	125cc	2005
9	(West Germany) Kreidler	50cc	1969, 1971, 1972, 1974, 1975, 1977, 1979, 1980, 1981
9	(Italy) Ducati	MotoGP	2008, 2023, 2024, 2025, 2026
9	(Italy) Ducati	MotoE	2023 Race 1, 2023 Race 2, 2024 Race 1, 2024 Race 2
8	(Japan) Kawasaki	350cc	1981
8	(Japan) Kawasaki	250cc	1978, 1979, 1980, 1981, 1982
8	(Japan) Kawasaki	125cc	1969, 1971
8	(Italy) Gilera	500cc	1954, 1955, 1956, 1957
8	(Italy) Gilera	350cc	1957
8	(Italy) Gilera	250cc	2008, 2009
8	(Italy) Gilera	125cc	1956
8	(Germany) Kalex	Moto2	2015, 2016, 2017, 2019, 2021, 2022, 2023, 2025
6	(Spain) Derbi	125cc	2000, 2008, 2010
6	(Spain) Derbi	80cc	1986, 1988
6	(Spain) Derbi	50cc	1970
5	(West Germany) NSU	250cc	1953, 1954, 1955
5	(West Germany) NSU	125cc	1952, 1954
5	(Italy) Garelli	125cc	1983, 1984, 1986, 1987
5	(Italy) Garelli	50cc	1982
4	(Italy) Aermacchi	350cc	1976
4	(Italy) Aermacchi	250cc	1975, 1976
4	(Italy) Aermacchi	125cc	1970
4	(Italy) Morbidelli	125cc	1972, 1975, 1976, 1977
4	(Switzerland) Krauser	80cc	1985, 1987, 1989
4	(Switzerland) Krauser	50cc	1983
4	(Switzerland) Suter	Moto2	2011, 2012, 2013, 2014
3	(United Kingdom) Norton	500cc	1952
3	(United Kingdom) Norton	350cc	1952, 1954
3	(Italy) Minarelli	125cc	1978, 1979, 1981
2	(Italy) Moto Guzzi	350cc	1955, 1956
2	(Spain) Bultaco	50cc	1976, 1978
2	(Italy) Boscoscuro	Moto2	2024, 2026

=== By year ===
A pink background indicates an event that was not part of the Grand Prix motorcycle racing championship.

Year	Track	Moto3		Moto2		MotoGP		Report
Year	Track	Rider	Manufacturer	Rider	Manufacturer	Rider	Manufacturer	Report
2026	Sachsenring	(Spain) Brian Uriarte	KTM	(Spain) Iván Ortolá	Boscoscuro	(Spain) Marc Márquez	Ducati	Report
2025	Sachsenring	(Spain) David Muñoz	KTM	(Turkey) Deniz Öncü	Kalex	(Spain) Marc Márquez	Ducati	Report

Year	Track	MotoE				Moto3		Moto2		MotoGP		Report
Year	Track	Race 1		Race 2		Moto3		Moto2		MotoGP		Report
Year	Track	Rider	Manufacturer	Rider	Manufacturer	Rider	Manufacturer	Rider	Manufacturer	Rider	Manufacturer	Report
2024	Sachsenring	(Spain) Héctor Garzó	Ducati	(Spain) Héctor Garzó	Ducati	(Colombia) David Alonso	CFMoto	(Spain) Fermín Aldeguer	Boscoscuro	(Italy) Francesco Bagnaia	Ducati	Report
2023	Sachsenring	(Spain) Jordi Torres	Ducati	(Spain) Héctor Garzó	Ducati	(Turkey) Deniz Öncü	KTM	(Spain) Pedro Acosta	Kalex	(Spain) Jorge Martín	Ducati	Report

Year	Track	Moto3		Moto2		MotoGP		Report
Year	Track	Rider	Manufacturer	Rider	Manufacturer	Rider	Manufacturer	Report
2022	Sachsenring	(Spain) Izan Guevara	GasGas	(Spain) Augusto Fernández	Kalex	(France) Fabio Quartararo	Yamaha	Report
2021	Sachsenring	(Spain) Pedro Acosta	KTM	(Australia) Remy Gardner	Kalex	(Spain) Marc Márquez	Honda	Report
2020	Sachsenring	Cancelled due to COVID-19 concerns						

Year	Track	MotoE		Moto3		Moto2		MotoGP		Report
Year	Track	Rider	Manufacturer	Rider	Manufacturer	Rider	Manufacturer	Rider	Manufacturer	Report
2019	Sachsenring	(Finland) Niki Tuuli	Energica	(Italy) Lorenzo Dalla Porta	Honda	(Spain) Álex Márquez	Kalex	(Spain) Marc Márquez	Honda	Report

Year	Track	Moto3		Moto2		MotoGP		Report
Year	Track	Rider	Manufacturer	Rider	Manufacturer	Rider	Manufacturer	Report
2018	Sachsenring	(Spain) Jorge Martín	Honda	(South Africa) Brad Binder	KTM	(Spain) Marc Márquez	Honda	Report
2017	Sachsenring	(Spain) Joan Mir	Honda	(Italy) Franco Morbidelli	Kalex	(Spain) Marc Márquez	Honda	Report
2016	Sachsenring	(Malaysia) Khairul Idham Pawi	Honda	(France) Johann Zarco	Kalex	(Spain) Marc Márquez	Honda	Report
2015	Sachsenring	(United Kingdom) Danny Kent	Honda	(Belgium) Xavier Siméon	Kalex	(Spain) Marc Márquez	Honda	Report
2014	Sachsenring	(Australia) Jack Miller	KTM	(Switzerland) Dominique Aegerter	Suter	(Spain) Marc Márquez	Honda	Report
2013	Sachsenring	(Spain) Álex Rins	KTM	(Spain) Jordi Torres	Suter	(Spain) Marc Márquez	Honda	Report
2012	Sachsenring	(Germany) Sandro Cortese	KTM	(Spain) Marc Márquez	Suter	(Spain) Dani Pedrosa	Honda	Report
Year	Track	125cc		Moto2		MotoGP		Report
Year	Track	Rider	Manufacturer	Rider	Manufacturer	Rider	Manufacturer	Report
2011	Sachsenring	(Spain) Héctor Faubel	Aprilia	(Spain) Marc Márquez	Suter	(Spain) Dani Pedrosa	Honda	Report
2010	Sachsenring	(Spain) Marc Márquez	Derbi	(Spain) Toni Elías	Moriwaki	(Spain) Dani Pedrosa	Honda	Report
Year	Track	125cc		250cc		MotoGP		Report
Year	Track	Rider	Manufacturer	Rider	Manufacturer	Rider	Manufacturer	Report
2009	Sachsenring	(Spain) Julián Simón	Aprilia	(Italy) Marco Simoncelli	Gilera	(Italy) Valentino Rossi	Yamaha	Report
2008	Sachsenring	(France) Mike Di Meglio	Derbi	(Italy) Marco Simoncelli	Gilera	(Australia) Casey Stoner	Ducati	Report
2007	Sachsenring	(Hungary) Gábor Talmácsi	Aprilia	(Japan) Hiroshi Aoyama	KTM	(Spain) Dani Pedrosa	Honda	Report
2006	Sachsenring	(Italy) Mattia Pasini	Aprilia	(Japan) Yuki Takahashi	Honda	(Italy) Valentino Rossi	Yamaha	Report
2005	Sachsenring	(Finland) Mika Kallio	KTM	(Spain) Daniel Pedrosa	Honda	(Italy) Valentino Rossi	Yamaha	Report
2004	Sachsenring	(Italy) Roberto Locatelli	Aprilia	(Spain) Daniel Pedrosa	Honda	(Italy) Max Biaggi	Honda	Report
2003	Sachsenring	(Italy) Stefano Perugini	Aprilia	(Italy) Roberto Rolfo	Honda	(Spain) Sete Gibernau	Honda	Report
2002	Sachsenring	(France) Arnaud Vincent	Aprilia	(Italy) Marco Melandri	Aprilia	(Italy) Valentino Rossi	Honda	Report
Year	Track	125cc		250cc		500cc		Report
Year	Track	Rider	Manufacturer	Rider	Manufacturer	Rider	Manufacturer	Report
2001	Sachsenring	(Italy) Simone Sanna	Aprilia	(Italy) Marco Melandri	Aprilia	(Italy) Max Biaggi	Yamaha	Report
2000	Sachsenring	(Japan) Youichi Ui	Derbi	(France) Olivier Jacque	Yamaha	(Brazil) Alex Barros	Honda	Report
1999	Sachsenring	(Italy) Marco Melandri	Honda	(Italy) Valentino Rossi	Aprilia	(United States) Kenny Roberts Jr.	Suzuki	Report
1998	Sachsenring	(Japan) Tomomi Manako	Honda	(Japan) Tetsuya Harada	Aprilia	(Australia) Mick Doohan	Honda	Report
1997	Nürburgring GP-Strecke	(Italy) Valentino Rossi	Aprilia	(Japan) Tetsuya Harada	Aprilia	(Australia) Mick Doohan	Honda	Report
1996	Nürburgring GP-Strecke	(Japan) Masaki Tokudome	Aprilia	(Germany) Ralf Waldmann	Honda	(Italy) Luca Cadalora	Honda	Report
1995	Nürburgring GP-Strecke	(Japan) Haruchika Aoki	Honda	(Italy) Max Biaggi	Aprilia	(Australia) Daryl Beattie	Suzuki	Report
1994	Hockenheim	(Germany) Dirk Raudies	Honda	(Italy) Loris Capirossi	Honda	(Australia) Mick Doohan	Honda	Report
1993	Hockenheim	(Germany) Dirk Raudies	Honda	(Italy) Doriano Romboni	Honda	(Australia) Daryl Beattie	Honda	Report
1992	Hockenheim	(Italy) Bruno Casanova	Aprilia	(Italy) Pierfrancesco Chili	Aprilia	(Australia) Mick Doohan	Honda	Report
1991	Hockenheim	(Germany) Ralf Waldmann	Honda	(Germany) Helmut Bradl	Honda	(United States) Kevin Schwantz	Suzuki	Report
1990	Nürburgring GP-Strecke	(Italy) Doriano Romboni	Honda	(Netherlands) Wilco Zeelenberg	Honda	(United States) Kevin Schwantz	Suzuki	Report

Year	Track	80cc		125cc		250cc		500cc		Report
Year	Track	Rider	Manufacturer	Rider	Manufacturer	Rider	Manufacturer	Rider	Manufacturer	Report
1989	Hockenheim	(West Germany) Peter Öttl	Krauser	(Spain) Àlex Crivillé	JJ Cobas	(Spain) Sito Pons	Honda	(United States) Wayne Rainey	Yamaha	Report
1988	Nürburgring GP-Strecke	(Spain) Jorge Martínez	Derbi	(Italy) Ezio Gianola	Honda	(Italy) Luca Cadalora	Yamaha	(United States) Kevin Schwantz	Suzuki	Report
1987	Hockenheim	(West Germany) Gerhard Waibel	Krauser	(Italy) Fausto Gresini	Garelli	(West Germany) Anton Mang	Honda	(United States) Eddie Lawson	Yamaha	Report
1986	Nürburgring GP-Strecke	(Spain) Manuel Herreros	Derbi	(Italy) Luca Cadalora	Garelli	(Venezuela) Carlos Lavado	Yamaha	(United States) Eddie Lawson	Yamaha	Report
1985	Hockenheim	(Switzerland) Stefan Dörflinger	Krauser	(Austria) August Auinger	Monnet	(West Germany) Martin Wimmer	Yamaha	(France) Christian Sarron	Yamaha	Report
1984	Nürburgring GP-Strecke	(Switzerland) Stefan Dörflinger	Zündapp	(Spain) Ángel Nieto	Garelli	(France) Christian Sarron	Yamaha	(United States) Freddie Spencer	Honda	Report
Year	Track	50cc		125cc		250cc		500cc		Report
Year	Track	Rider	Manufacturer	Rider	Manufacturer	Rider	Manufacturer	Rider	Manufacturer	Report
1983	Hockenheim	(Switzerland) Stefan Dörflinger	Krauser	(Spain) Ángel Nieto	Garelli	(Venezuela) Carlos Lavado	Yamaha	(United States) Kenny Roberts	Yamaha	Report

Year	Track	50cc		125cc		250cc		350cc		500cc		Report
Year	Track	Rider	Manufacturer	Rider	Manufacturer	Rider	Manufacturer	Rider	Manufacturer	Rider	Manufacturer	Report
1982	Hockenheim	(Italy) Eugenio Lazzarini	Garelli			(West Germany) Anton Mang	Kawasaki	(West Germany) Manfred Herweh	Yamaha	(United States) Randy Mamola	Suzuki	Report
1981	Hockenheim	(Switzerland) Stefan Dörflinger	Kreidler	(Spain) Ángel Nieto	Minarelli	(West Germany) Anton Mang	Kawasaki	(West Germany) Anton Mang	Kawasaki	(United States) Kenny Roberts	Yamaha	Report
1980	Nürburgring Nordschleife	(Switzerland) Stefan Dörflinger	Kreidler	(France) Guy Bertin	Motobécane	(South Africa) Kork Ballington	Kawasaki	(South Africa) Jon Ekerold	Yamaha	(Italy) Marco Lucchinelli	Suzuki	Report
1979	Hockenheim	(West Germany) Gerhard Waibel	Kreidler	(Spain) Ángel Nieto	Minarelli	(South Africa) Kork Ballington	Kawasaki	(South Africa) Jon Ekerold	Yamaha	(Netherlands) Wil Hartog	Suzuki	Report
1978	Nürburgring Nordschleife	(Spain) Ricardo Tormo	Bultaco	(Spain) Ángel Nieto	Minarelli	(South Africa) Kork Ballington	Kawasaki	(Japan) Takazumi Katayama	Yamaha	(Italy) Virginio Ferrari	Suzuki	Report
1977	Hockenheim	(West Germany) Herbert Rittberger	Kreidler	(Italy) Pier Paolo Bianchi	Morbidelli	(France) Christian Sarron	Yamaha	(Japan) Takazumi Katayama	Yamaha	(United Kingdom) Barry Sheene	Suzuki	Report
1976	Nürburgring Nordschleife	(Spain) Ángel Nieto	Bultaco	(West Germany) Anton Mang	Morbidelli	(Italy) Walter Villa	Aermacchi Harley-Davidson	(Italy) Walter Villa	Aermacchi Harley-Davidson	(Italy) Giacomo Agostini	MV Agusta	Report
1975	Hockenheim	(Spain) Ángel Nieto	Kreidler	(Italy) Paolo Pileri	Morbidelli	(Italy) Walter Villa	Aermacchi Harley-Davidson	(Venezuela) Johnny Cecotto	Yamaha	(Italy) Giacomo Agostini	Yamaha	Report
1974	Nürburgring Nordschleife	(West Germany) Ingo Emmerich	Kreidler	(West Germany) Fritz Reitmaier	Maico	(West Germany) Helmut Kassner	Yamaha	(West Germany) Helmut Kassner	Yamaha	(West Germany) Edmund Czihak	Yamaha	Report
1973	Hockenheim	(Netherlands) Theo Timmer	Jamathi	(Sweden) Kent Andersson	Yamaha	(Finland) Jarno Saarinen	Yamaha	(Finland) Teuvo Länsivuori	Yamaha	(United Kingdom) Phil Read	MV Agusta	Report
1972	Nürburgring Nordschleife	(Netherlands) Jan de Vries	Kreidler	(Italy) Gilberto Parlotti	Morbidelli	(Japan) Hideo Kanaya	Yamaha	(Finland) Jarno Saarinen	Yamaha	(Italy) Giacomo Agostini	MV Agusta	Report
1971	Hockenheim	(Netherlands) Jan de Vries	Kreidler	(United Kingdom) Dave Simmonds	Kawasaki	(United Kingdom) Phil Read	Yamaha	(Italy) Giacomo Agostini	MV Agusta	(Italy) Giacomo Agostini	MV Agusta	Report
1970	Nürburgring Nordschleife	(Spain) Ángel Nieto	Derbi	(Australia) John Dodds	Aermacchi	(Australia) Kel Carruthers	Yamaha	(Italy) Giacomo Agostini	MV Agusta	(Italy) Giacomo Agostini	MV Agusta	Report
1969	Hockenheim	(Netherlands) Aalt Toersen	Kreidler	(United Kingdom) Dave Simmonds	Kawasaki	(Sweden) Kent Andersson	Yamaha	(Italy) Giacomo Agostini	MV Agusta	(Italy) Giacomo Agostini	MV Agusta	Report
1968	Nürburgring Südschleife	(West Germany) Hans-Georg Anscheidt	Suzuki	(United Kingdom) Phil Read	Yamaha	(United Kingdom) Bill Ivy	Yamaha	(Italy) Giacomo Agostini	MV Agusta	(Italy) Giacomo Agostini	MV Agusta	Report
1967	Hockenheim	(West Germany) Hans-Georg Anscheidt	Suzuki	(Japan) Yoshimi Katayama	Suzuki	(United Kingdom) Ralph Bryans	Honda	(United Kingdom) Mike Hailwood	Honda	(Italy) Giacomo Agostini	MV Agusta	Report
1966	Hockenheim	(West Germany) Hans-Georg Anscheidt	Suzuki	(Switzerland) Luigi Taveri	Honda	(United Kingdom) Mike Hailwood	Honda	(United Kingdom) Mike Hailwood	Honda	(Rhodesia) Jim Redman	Honda	Report
1965	Nürburgring Südschleife	(United Kingdom) Ralph Bryans	Honda	(New Zealand) Hugh Anderson	Suzuki	(United Kingdom) Phil Read	Yamaha	(Italy) Giacomo Agostini	MV Agusta	(United Kingdom) Mike Hailwood	MV Agusta	Report
1964	Solitude	(United Kingdom) Ralph Bryans	Honda	(Rhodesia) Jim Redman	Honda	(United Kingdom) Phil Read	Yamaha	(Rhodesia) Jim Redman	Honda	(United Kingdom) Mike Hailwood	MV Agusta	Report
1963	Hockenheim	(New Zealand) Hugh Anderson	Suzuki	(West Germany) Ernst Degner	Suzuki	(Italy) Tarquinio Provini	Morini	(Federation of Rhodesia and Nyasaland) Jim Redman	Honda			Report
1962	Solitude	(West Germany) Ernst Degner	Suzuki	(Switzerland) Luigi Taveri	Honda	(Federation of Rhodesia and Nyasaland) Jim Redman	Honda					Report
1961	Hockenheim	(Socialist Federal Republic of Yugoslavia) Miro Zelnik		(East Germany) Ernst Degner	MZ	(Japan) Kunimitsu Takahashi	Honda	(Czechoslovakia) František Šťastný	Jawa	(Federation of Rhodesia and Nyasaland) Gary Hocking	MV Agusta	Report

Year	Track	125cc		250cc		350cc		500cc		Report
Year	Track	Rider	Manufacturer	Rider	Manufacturer	Rider	Manufacturer	Rider	Manufacturer	Report
1960	Solitude			(Federation of Rhodesia and Nyasaland) Gary Hocking	MV Agusta			(United Kingdom) John Surtees	MV Agusta	Report
1959	Hockenheim	(Italy) Carlo Ubbiali	MV Agusta	(Italy) Carlo Ubbiali	MV Agusta	(United Kingdom) John Surtees	MV Agusta	(United Kingdom) John Surtees	MV Agusta	Report
1958	Nürburgring Nordschleife	(Italy) Carlo Ubbiali	MV Agusta	(Italy) Tarquinio Provini	MV Agusta	(United Kingdom) John Surtees	MV Agusta	(United Kingdom) John Surtees	MV Agusta	Report
1957	Hockenheim	(Italy) Carlo Ubbiali	MV Agusta	(Italy) Carlo Ubbiali	MV Agusta	(Italy) Libero Liberati	Gilera	(Italy) Libero Liberati	Gilera	Report
1956	Solitude	(Italy) Romolo Ferri	Gilera	(Italy) Carlo Ubbiali	MV Agusta	(United Kingdom) Bill Lomas	Moto Guzzi	(Republic of Ireland) Reg Armstrong	Gilera	Report
1955	Nürburgring Nordschleife	(Italy) Carlo Ubbiali	MV Agusta	(West Germany) Hermann Paul Müller	NSU	(United Kingdom) Bill Lomas	Moto Guzzi	(United Kingdom) Geoff Duke	Gilera	Report
1954	Solitude	(Austria) Rupert Hollaus	NSU	(West Germany) Werner Haas	NSU	(Federation of Rhodesia and Nyasaland) Ray Amm	Norton	(United Kingdom) Geoff Duke	Gilera	Report
1953	Schottenring	(Italy) Carlo Ubbiali	MV Agusta	(West Germany) Werner Haas	NSU	(Italy) Carlo Bandirola		(West Germany) Walter Zeller		Report
1952	Solitude	(West Germany) Werner Haas	NSU	(West Germany) Rudi Felgenheier	DKW	(Republic of Ireland) Reg Armstrong	Norton	(Republic of Ireland) Reg Armstrong	Norton	Report
1951	Solitude	(West Germany) Hermann Paul Müller		(Italy) Enrico Lorenzetti		(United Kingdom) Geoff Duke		(United Kingdom) Geoff Duke		Report

Year	Track	175cc	250cc	350cc	500cc	Report
1939	Sachsenring		(Italy) Nello Pagani	(Germany) Walter Hamelehle	(Italy) Dorino Serafini	Report
1938	Sachsenring		(Germany) Ewald Kluge	(United Kingdom) John White	(Germany) Georg Meier	Report
1937	Sachsenring		(Germany) Ewald Kluge	(United Kingdom) Harold Daniell	(Germany) Karl Gall	Report
1936	Sachsenring (Hohenstein-Ernstthal)		(Republic of Ireland) H. G. Tyrell Smith	(United Kingdom) Freddie Frith	(United Kingdom) Jimmie Guthrie	Report
1935	Sachsenring (Hohenstein-Ernstthal)		(Germany) Walfried Winkler	(United Kingdom) Walter Rusk	(United Kingdom) Jimmie Guthrie	Report
1934	Sachsenring (Hohenstein-Ernstthal)		(Republic of Ireland) H. G. Tyrell Smith	(United Kingdom) Jimmie Simpson	(Germany) Otto Ley	Report
1933	AVUS		(United Kingdom) Charlie Dodson	(Germany) Ernst Loof	(Germany) Josef Stelzer	Report
1931	Nürburgring Nordschleife		(Switzerland) Elvetio Toricelli	(Republic of Ireland) H. G. Tyrell Smith	(Republic of Ireland) Stanley Woods	Report
1930	Nürburgring Nordschleife		(United Kingdom) Les Crabtree	(United Kingdom) Jimmie Guthrie	(United Kingdom) Graham Walker	Report
1929	Nürburgring Nordschleife	(Germany) Arthur Geiß	(United Kingdom) Syd Crabtree	(United Kingdom) Wal Handley	(Republic of Ireland) H. G. Tyrell Smith	Report
1928	Nürburgring Nordschleife	(Germany) Arthur Geiß	(United Kingdom) Syd Crabtree	(Italy) Pietro Ghersi	(United Kingdom) Charlie Dodson	Report
1927	Nürburgring Nordschleife	(Germany) Willy Henkelmann	(United Kingdom) Cecil Ashby	(United Kingdom) Jimmie Simpson	(United Kingdom) Graham Walker	Report
1926	AVUS	(Germany) Kurt Friedrich	(United Kingdom) Jock Porter	(United Kingdom) Jimmie Simpson	(Germany) Josef Stelzer	Report
1925	AVUS	(Austria) Willy Zick	(United Kingdom) Cecil Ashby	(Italy) Miro Maffeis	(Germany) Paul Köppen	Report

== Winners of the East German motorcycle Grand Prix ==
East German Grand Prix
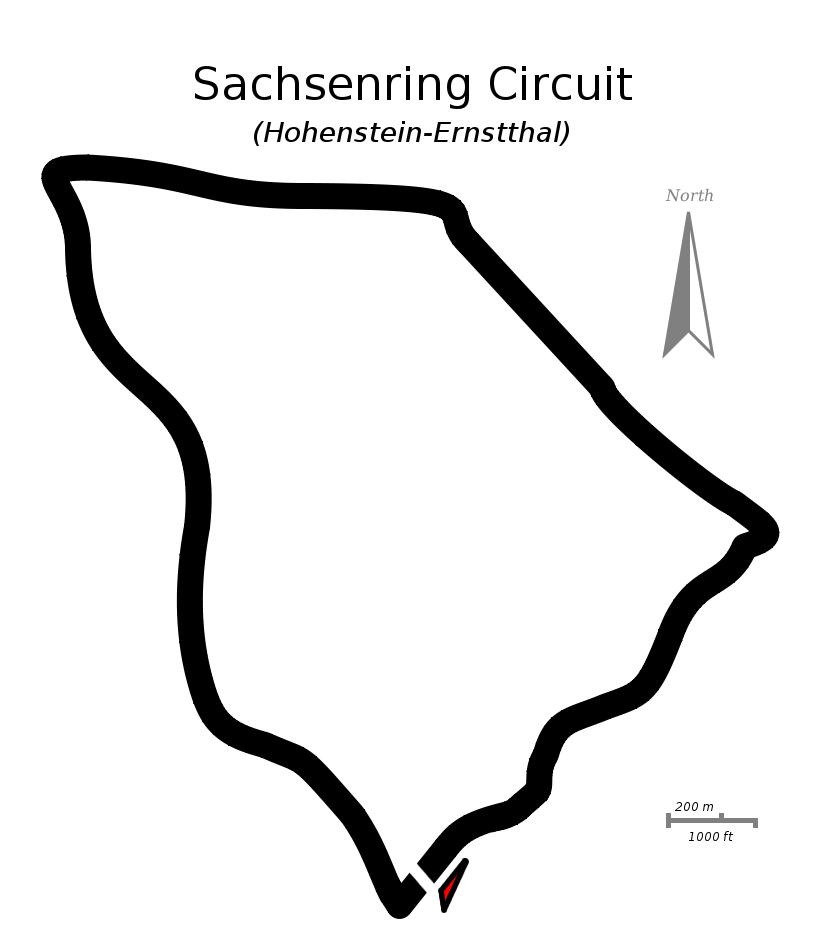

Grand Prix motorcycle racing
- Venue: Sachsenring (1961–1972)
- First race: 1961
- Last race: 1972
- Most wins (rider): Giacomo Agostini (11)
- Most wins (manufacturer): MV Agusta (19)

=== Multiple winners (riders) ===
# Wins	Rider	Wins	
# Wins	Rider	Category	Years won
11	(Italy) Giacomo Agostini	500cc	1967, 1968, 1969, 1970, 1971, 1972
11	(Italy) Giacomo Agostini	350cc	1966, 1968, 1969, 1970, 1971
9	(United Kingdom) Mike Hailwood	500cc	1962, 1963, 1964, 1965
9	(United Kingdom) Mike Hailwood	350cc	1963, 1967
9	(United Kingdom) Mike Hailwood	250cc	1961, 1963, 1966
5	(Rhodesia) Jim Redman	350cc	1962, 1964, 1965
5	(Rhodesia) Jim Redman	250cc	1962, 1965
4	(Spain) Ángel Nieto	125cc	1970, 1971
4	(Spain) Ángel Nieto	50cc	1969, 1971
4	(United Kingdom) Phil Read	350cc	1972
4	(United Kingdom) Phil Read	250cc	1964, 1967
4	(United Kingdom) Phil Read	125cc	1968
2	(Federation of Rhodesia and Nyasaland) Gary Hocking	500cc	1961
2	(Federation of Rhodesia and Nyasaland) Gary Hocking	350cc	1961
2	(New Zealand) Hugh Anderson	125cc	1963, 1964
2	(Switzerland) Luigi Taveri	125cc	1962, 1966
2	(United Kingdom) Bill Ivy	250cc	1968
2	(United Kingdom) Bill Ivy	125cc	1967

=== Multiple winners (manufacturers) ===
# Wins	Manufacturer	Wins	
# Wins	Manufacturer	Category	Years won
19	(Italy) MV Agusta	500cc	1961, 1962, 1963, 1964, 1965, 1967, 1968, 1969, 1970, 1971, 1972
19	(Italy) MV Agusta	350cc	1961, 1963, 1966, 1968, 1969, 1970, 1971, 1972
10	(Japan) Honda	350cc	1962, 1964, 1965, 1967
10	(Japan) Honda	250cc	1961, 1962, 1965, 1966
10	(Japan) Honda	125cc	1962, 1966
8	(Japan) Yamaha	250cc	1964, 1967, 1968, 1970, 1971, 1972
8	(Japan) Yamaha	125cc	1967, 1968
4	(Spain) Derbi	125cc	1970, 1971
4	(Spain) Derbi	50cc	1969, 1971
3	(Japan) Suzuki	125cc	1963, 1964, 1965
2	(West Germany) MZ	250cc	1963
2	(West Germany) MZ	125cc	1961
2	(Netherlands) Jamathi	50cc	1970, 1972

=== By year ===
A pink background indicates an event that was not part of the Grand Prix motorcycle racing championship.

Year	Track	50cc		125cc		250cc		350cc		500cc		Report
Year	Track	Rider	Manufacturer	Rider	Manufacturer	Rider	Manufacturer	Rider	Manufacturer	Rider	Manufacturer	Report
1972	Sachsenring	(Netherlands) Theo Timmer	Jamathi	(Sweden) Börje Jansson	Maico	(Finland) Jarno Saarinen	Yamaha	(United Kingdom) Phil Read	MV Agusta	(Italy) Giacomo Agostini	MV Agusta	Report
1971	Sachsenring	(Spain) Ángel Nieto	Derbi	(Spain) Ángel Nieto	Derbi	(West Germany) Dieter Braun	Yamaha	(Italy) Giacomo Agostini	MV Agusta	(Italy) Giacomo Agostini	MV Agusta	Report
1970	Sachsenring	(Netherlands) Aalt Toersen	Jamathi	(Spain) Ángel Nieto	Derbi	(United Kingdom) Rod Gould	Yamaha	(Italy) Giacomo Agostini	MV Agusta	(Italy) Giacomo Agostini	MV Agusta	Report
1969	Sachsenring	(Spain) Ángel Nieto	Derbi	(United Kingdom) Dave Simmonds	Kawasaki	(Italy) Renzo Pasolini	Benelli	(Italy) Giacomo Agostini	MV Agusta	(Italy) Giacomo Agostini	MV Agusta	Report
1968	Sachsenring			(United Kingdom) Phil Read	Yamaha	(United Kingdom) Bill Ivy	Yamaha	(Italy) Giacomo Agostini	MV Agusta	(Italy) Giacomo Agostini	MV Agusta	Report
1967	Sachsenring			(United Kingdom) Bill Ivy	Yamaha	(United Kingdom) Phil Read	Yamaha	(United Kingdom) Mike Hailwood	Honda	(Italy) Giacomo Agostini	MV Agusta	Report
1966	Sachsenring			(Switzerland) Luigi Taveri	Honda	(United Kingdom) Mike Hailwood	Honda	(Italy) Giacomo Agostini	MV Agusta	(Czechoslovakia) František Šťastný	Jawa-CZ	Report
1965	Sachsenring			(United Kingdom) Frank Perris	Suzuki	(Rhodesia) Jim Redman	Honda	(Rhodesia) Jim Redman	Honda	(United Kingdom) Mike Hailwood	MV Agusta	Report
1964	Sachsenring			(New Zealand) Hugh Anderson	Suzuki	(United Kingdom) Phil Read	Yamaha	(Rhodesia) Jim Redman	Honda	(United Kingdom) Mike Hailwood	MV Agusta	Report
1963	Sachsenring			(New Zealand) Hugh Anderson	Suzuki	(United Kingdom) Mike Hailwood	MZ	(United Kingdom) Mike Hailwood	MV Agusta	(United Kingdom) Mike Hailwood	MV Agusta	Report
1962	Sachsenring	(Netherlands) Jan Huberts	Kreidler	(Switzerland) Luigi Taveri	Honda	(Federation of Rhodesia and Nyasaland) Jim Redman	Honda	(Federation of Rhodesia and Nyasaland) Jim Redman	Honda	(United Kingdom) Mike Hailwood	MV Agusta	Report

Year	Track	125cc		250cc		350cc		500cc		Report
Year	Track	Rider	Manufacturer	Rider	Manufacturer	Rider	Manufacturer	Rider	Manufacturer	Report
1961	Sachsenring	(East Germany) Ernst Degner	MZ	(United Kingdom) Mike Hailwood	Honda	(Federation of Rhodesia and Nyasaland) Gary Hocking	MV Agusta	(Federation of Rhodesia and Nyasaland) Gary Hocking	MV Agusta	Report
1960	Sachsenring	(East Germany) Ernst Degner		(New Zealand) John Hempleman		(Federation of Rhodesia and Nyasaland) Jim Redman		(New Zealand) John Hempleman		Report
1959	Sachsenring	(East Germany) Werner Musiol		(Federation of Rhodesia and Nyasaland) Gary Hocking		(New Zealand) John Hempleman		(Federation of Rhodesia and Nyasaland) Gary Hocking		Report
1958	Sachsenring	(East Germany) Ernst Degner		(East Germany) Horst Fügner		(Switzerland) Luigi Taveri		(United Kingdom) Dickie Dale		Report
