= 1968 Grand Prix motorcycle racing season =

Sports season

1968 F.I.M. Grand Prix motorcycle racing season

Seasons
- ← 1967 1969 →

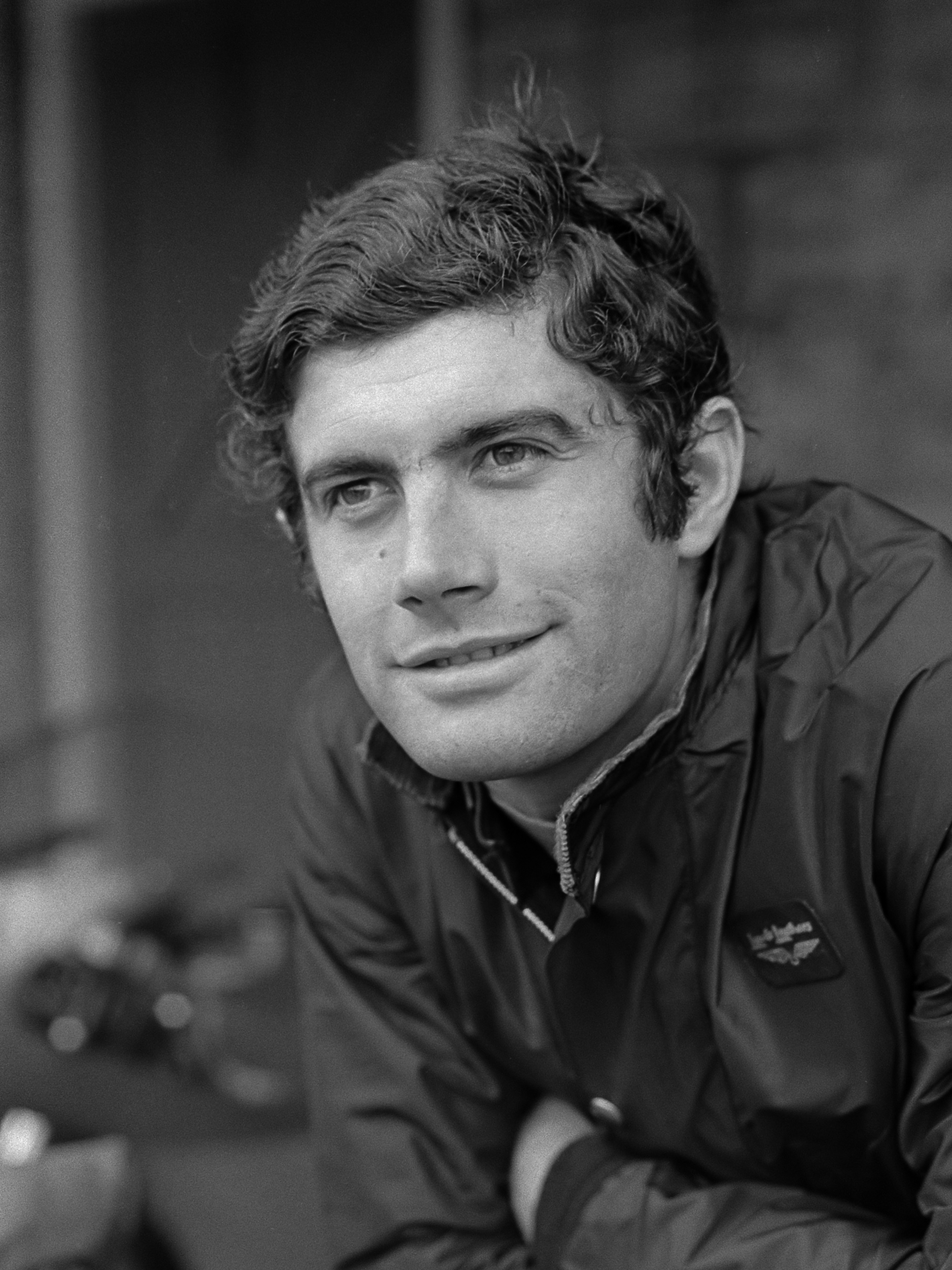
Giacomo Agostini (1968)

The 1968 Grand Prix motorcycle racing season was the 20th F.I.M. Road Racing World Championship Grand Prix season. The season consisted of ten Grand Prix races in six classes: 500cc, 350cc, 250cc, 125cc, 50cc and Sidecars 500cc. It began on 21 April, with German Grand Prix and ended with Nations Grand Prix on 15 September. As the sidecar race was cancelled at the Nations Grand Prix, it was announced that a replacement race would be held at Hockenheimring in October alongside the German national championship.

== Season summary ==
The FIM implemented new rules for the 1968 season, limiting all gearboxes to six-speeds, 125cc and 250cc motorcycles to no more than two cylinders, and 350cc and 500cc motorcycles to four cylinders. The new rules favored two-stroke engines over four-stroke engines in the smaller displacement classes, and since the Honda factory had a company policy to race only four-stroke motorcycles, they decided to withdraw from motorcycle racing to concentrate on Formula One racing. Hailwood would also retire from motorcycle racing to pursue a career in Formula One racing.

In the wake of Honda's withdrawal, Giacomo Agostini and the MV Agusta team faced little opposition in the larger displacement classes from any major manufacturers, competing largely against privateer racers using ageing machinery. Agostini won every race in the 500 and 350 classes.

The 250 crown went to Phil Read amidst a controversy between Yamaha teammates. Read was supposed to take the 125 title while leaving the 250 crown for Bill Ivy. After Read captured the 125 title, he ignored team orders and went after the 250 title as well. Ivy and Read finished the championship tying on points and race results, and in this unlikely scenario, the FIM decided to give Read the title based on aggregate race times. As a result, Yamaha would discharge Read and he would never regain a place on the factory team. Hans-Georg Anscheidt would capture his third consecutive 50cc championship for Suzuki.

== 1968 Grand Prix season calendar ==
Round	Date	Grand Prix	Circuit	50cc winner	125cc winner	250cc winner	350cc winner	500cc winner	Sidecars 500cc winner	Report
1	21 April	(Germany) German Grand Prix	Nürburgring Sudschleife	(West Germany) Hans-Georg Anscheidt	(United Kingdom) Phil Read	(United Kingdom) Bill Ivy	(Italy) Giacomo Agostini	(Italy) Giacomo Agostini	(Germany) Fath / Kalauch	Report
2	5 May	(Spain) Spanish Grand Prix	Montjuïc circuit	(West Germany) Hans-Georg Anscheidt	(Spain) Salvador Cañellas	(United Kingdom) Phil Read		(Italy) Giacomo Agostini		Report
3	14 June	Isle of Man TT	Snaefell Mountain	(Australia) Barry Smith	(United Kingdom) Phil Read	(United Kingdom) Bill Ivy	(Italy) Giacomo Agostini	(Italy) Giacomo Agostini	(Germany) Schauzu/Horst Schneider	Report
4	29 June	(Netherlands) Dutch TT	TT Circuit Assen	(Netherlands) Paul Lodewijkx	(United Kingdom) Phil Read	(United Kingdom) Bill Ivy	(Italy) Giacomo Agostini	(Italy) Giacomo Agostini	(Germany) Attenberger / Schillinger	Report
5	7 July	(Belgium) Belgian Grand Prix	Spa-Francorchamps	(West Germany) Hans-Georg Anscheidt		(United Kingdom) Phil Read		(Italy) Giacomo Agostini	(Germany) Auerbacher / Hahn	Report
6	14 July	(East Germany) East German Grand Prix	Sachsenring		(United Kingdom) Phil Read	(United Kingdom) Bill Ivy	(Italy) Giacomo Agostini	(Italy) Giacomo Agostini		Report
7	21 July	(Czechoslovakia) Czechoslovak Grand Prix	Masaryk Circuit		(United Kingdom) Phil Read	(United Kingdom) Phil Read	(Italy) Giacomo Agostini	(Italy) Giacomo Agostini		Report
8	4 August	(Finland) Finnish Grand Prix	Imatra Circuit		(United Kingdom) Phil Read	(United Kingdom) Phil Read		(Italy) Giacomo Agostini	(Germany) Fath / Kalauch	Report
9	17 August	(Northern Ireland) Ulster Grand Prix	Dundrod Circuit		(United Kingdom) Bill Ivy	(United Kingdom) Bill Ivy	(Italy) Giacomo Agostini	(Italy) Giacomo Agostini		Report
10	15 September	(Italy) Nations Grand Prix	Monza		(United Kingdom) Bill Ivy	(United Kingdom) Phil Read	(Italy) Giacomo Agostini	(Italy) Giacomo Agostini	Cancelled	Report
11 (Note: The sidecar race at the 1968 Nations Grand Prix was cancelled and so a replacement race was held alongside the German national championship at the Hockenheimring in October.)	13 October	(Germany) Hockenheim Grand Prix	Hockenheimring						(Germany) Fath / Kalauch	

Footnotes

== Standings ==
=== Scoring system ===
Points were awarded to the top six finishers in each race. Only the best of three were counted on 50cc championships, best of five in 125cc championships, best of six in 250cc and 500cc championships, while in the Sidecars and 350cc, the best of four races were counted.

Position	1st	2nd	3rd	4th	5th	6th
Points	8	6	4	3	2	1

==== 500cc final standings ====
Pos	Rider	Machine	GER (Germany)	ESP (Spain)	MAN (Isle of Man)	HOL (Netherlands)	BEL (Belgium)	DDR (East Germany)	TCH (Czechoslovakia)	FIN (Finland)	ULS (Northern Ireland)	NAC (Italy)	Pts
1	(Italy) Giacomo Agostini	MV Agusta	1	**1**	1	1	1	1	1	1	1	1	**48** (80)
2	(Australia) Jack Findlay	Matchless / Cardani	Ret	2	Ret	2	2	3	2	2	5	Ret	**34** (36)
3	(Switzerland) Gyula Marsovszky	Matchless / Seeley-Matchless	4	5	Ret	Ret	Ret	11	3	6	Ret	Ret	**10**
4	(Italy) Alberto Pagani	Linto				Ret	Ret	2	Ret			4	**9**
5	(United Kingdom) Robin Fitton	Norton					4				2		**9**
6	(United Kingdom) Peter Williams	Arter-Matchless	3		Ret	4	7	7	5		20	9	**9**
7	(United Kingdom) Derek Woodman	Seeley	Ret		9	Ret	3	Ret	Ret	3	Ret	Ret	**8**
8	(United Kingdom) John Cooper	Seeley / Norton			Ret	3	6	4	Ret		Ret		**8**
9	(United Kingdom) Dan Shorey	Norton	2			Ret	Ret	10	6		Ret	Ret	**7**
10	(Italy) Angelo Bergamonti	Paton	Ret	4	Ret	Ret	Ret					3	**7**
11	(Australia) Kel Carruthers	Norton / Westlake	Ret		6	5	5	Ret	Ret	8	6	6	**7**
12	(United Kingdom) Brian Ball	Seeley-Matchless / Matchless			2						18		**6**
13	(Italy) Renzo Pasolini	Benelli										2	**6**
14	(Australia) John Dodds	Norton	Ret	3	Ret	Ret	10	Ret	Ret	5		8	**6**
15	(United Kingdom) Billie Nelson	Paton / Norton	Ret		7	Ret	Ret	5	4	7	Ret	Ret	**5**
16	(United Kingdom) John Hartle	Metisse / MV Agusta	Ret		Ret	9	11	9	Ret		3		**4**
17	(United Kingdom) Barry Randle	Norton			3								**4**
18	(United Kingdom) Percy Tait	Triumph			Ret						4		**3**
19	(United Kingdom) Bill Smith	Matchless / Paton			4						Ret	Ret	**3**
20	(Soviet Union) Nikolai Sevostianov	Vostok								4			**3**
21	(Czechoslovakia) Bohumil Staša	ČZ	5			Ret	13					Ret	**2**
22	(Italy) Silvano Bertarelli	Paton										5	**2**
=	(United Kingdom) Bernie Lund	Matchless			5								**2**
24	(United Kingdom) Rodney Gould	Norton / Triumph	6		Ret	8	8	Ret	Ret	Ret	Ret	7	**1**
25	(United Kingdom) Ron Chandler	Matchless / Seeley-Matchless	7			6	9	Ret	Ret			10	**1**
26	(United Kingdom) Rex Butcher	Norton / Matchless / Seeley	Ret	6	8	Ret		Ret	Ret		Ret	Ret	**1**
27	(United Kingdom) Godfrey Nash	Norton				Ret		6	Ret			Ret	**1**
28	(United Kingdom) Derek Lee	Gazelle / Matchless		Ret					7		9		**0**
29	(Germany) Walter Scheimann	Norton	12	7		12	12					11	**0**
30	(United Kingdom) Malcolm Uphill	Manning-Norton			Ret	7					Ret		**0**
31	(United Kingdom) John Blanchard	Metisse									7		**0**
32	(South Africa) Errol Cowan	Matchless / Norton / Metisse	8			Ret		12	10				**0**
33	(New Zealand) Keith Turner	Matchless	15		10	Ret		8	Ret	Ret			**0**
34	(Sweden) Bo Granath	Matchless / Seeley				Ret	14	14	8	Ret	Ret		**0**
35	(United Kingdom) Steve Jolly	Higley-Matchless			Ret	Ret					8		**0**
36	(Rhodesia) Gordon Keith	Monark		8									**0**
37	(Germany) Paul Eickelberg	Norton	10	9					13		19	14	**0**
38	(Finland) Pentti Lehtelä	Matchless						13	14	9			**0**
39	(Germany) Heinrich Rosenbusch	Norton	9										**0**
=	(Czech Republic) Frantisek Srna	Jawa							9				**0**
41	(Netherlands) Theo Louwes	Norton				10					12		**0**
42	(Finland) Hannu Kuparinen	Matchless								10			**0**
=	(Northern Ireland) William McCosh	Matchless									10		**0**
44	(Hungary) György Kurucz	Matchless / Metisse	18				15	15	11				**0**
45	(Germany) Armand Nerger	Honda	11										**0**
=	(Netherlands) Bert Oosterhuis	Norton				11							**0**
=	(Finland) Matti Salonen	Yamaha								11			**0**
=	(Australia) Ron Wilson	Norton									11		**0**
=	(United Kingdom) John Williams	Matchless			11								**0**
50	(Austria) Werner Bergold	Matchless							12				**0**
=	(Italy) Paolo Campanelli	Matchless										12	**0**
=	(United Kingdom) Tony Godfrey	Norton			12								**0**
=	(Austria) Wolfgang Stropek	Norton								12			**0**
54	(Germany) Karl Hoppe	Matchless	Ret			13	Ret	Ret	Ret				**0**
55	(Germany) Dieter Dögmann	BMW	13										**0**
=	(Italy) Gianfranco Domeniconi	Norton										13	**0**
=	(United Kingdom) George Fogarty	Matchless			13								**0**
=	(Finland) Osmo Hansen	Matchless								13			**0**
=	(Sweden) Jack Lindh	Seeley									13		**0**
60	(Austria) Edy Lenz	Matchless	14										**0**
=	(United Kingdom) Charlie Sanby	Norton			14								**0**
=	(United Kingdom) Barry Scully	Norton									14		**0**
63	(United Kingdom) Peter Humber	Humber-Crescent			Ret						15		**0**
64	(United Kingdom) Peter Darvill	Norton			15								**0**
65	(United Kingdom) Alan Lawton	Norton			16						16		**0**
66	(Germany) Ferdinand Kaczor	BMW	16										**0**
67	(Germany) Hartmut Allner	Matchless	17										**0**
=	(Northern Ireland) Bob McCurry	Matchless									17		**0**
=	(Netherlands) Jan Strijbis	Norton			17								**0**
70	(United Kingdom) Jim Evans	Norton			18								**0**
71	(Germany) Ralf Engelhardt	Norton	19							Ret			**0**
72	(Wales) Selwyn Griffiths	Matchless			19								**0**
73	(United Kingdom) Norman Price	Norton			20								**0**
74	(Northern Ireland) Harris Healey	Norton									21		**0**
=	(United Kingdom) Ian Munro	Matchless			21								**0**
76	(United Kingdom) Peter Gibson	Matchless			22								**0**
77	(United Kingdom) George Barnacle	Triumph			23								**0**
78	(United Kingdom) Brian Adams	Norton			24								**0**
79	(United Kingdom) Adrian Cooper	Norton			25								**0**
80	(United Kingdom) Bob Heath	BSA			26								**0**
81	(Switzerland) Gilbert Argo	Matchless			27								**0**
82	(United Kingdom) Walter Dawson	Norton			28								**0**
83	(United Kingdom) Jim Curry	Aermacchi / Metisse			29						Ret		**0**
84	(United Kingdom) Jim Ashton	Matchless			30								**0**
85	(United Kingdom) John Burgess	Norton			31			Ret					**0**
86	(United Kingdom) Graham Robinson	Read Titan			32								**0**
87	(United Kingdom) Brian Hunter	Matchless			33								**0**
88	(United Kingdom) Chris Neve	Matchless			34								**0**
89	(United Kingdom) Dennis Trollope	Norton			35								**0**
90	(United Kingdom) Reay Mackay	Vincent HRD			36								**0**
91	(Northern Ireland) Roy Reid	Norton			37								**0**
-	(United States) Marty Lunde	Norton	Ret					Ret			Ret		**0**
-	(Czechoslovakia) František Šťastný	Jawa					Ret		Ret		Ret		**0**
-	(United Kingdom) Vincent Duckett	Matchless			Ret						Ret		**0**
-	(United Kingdom) Denis Gallagher	Matchless			Ret						Ret		**0**
-	(Italy) Silvio Grassetti	Bianchi		Ret		Ret							**0**
-	(United Kingdom) Maurice Hawthorne	Norton	Ret					Ret					**0**
-	(Switzerland) Ernst Weiss	Seeley	Ret								Ret		**0**
-	(Sweden) Billy Andersson	Matchless			Ret								**0**
-	(France) Jean Aureal	Aermacchi					Ret						**0**
-	(United Kingdom) Alan Barnett	Kirby-Metisse			Ret								**0**
-	(Germany) Rupert Bauer	BMW	Ret										**0**
-	(United Kingdom) Bob Biscardine	Velocette			Ret								**0**
-	(Czech Republic) Karel Bojer	ČZ					Ret						**0**
-	(New Zealand) Ray Breingan	Norton			Ret								**0**
-	(Sweden) Bo Brolin	Matchless								Ret			**0**
-	(United Kingdom) Mick Burns	BSA-Metisse			Ret								**0**
-	(Germany) Hans-Otto Butenuth	BMW	Ret										**0**
-	(Germany) Heiner Butz	Bianchi	Ret										**0**
-	(Spain) Salvador Cañellas	Bultaco		Ret									**0**
-	(United Kingdom) Doug Cash	Norton			Ret								**0**
-	(Canada) Bert Clark	Rickman-Metisse			Ret								**0**
-	(United Kingdom) Roger Corbett	Norton			Ret								**0**
-	(United Kingdom) Conway Chivers	Norton			Ret								**0**
-	(Switzerland) Herbert Denzler	Matchless							Ret				**0**
-	(United Kingdom) Tom Dickie	Petty-Norton			Ret								**0**
-	(United Kingdom) Hugh Evans	BSA			Ret								**0**
-	(Germany) Rolf Fenker	Norton	Ret										**0**
-	(United Kingdom) Derek Filler	Norton			Ret								**0**
-	(United Kingdom) Bill Fulton	Norton			Ret								**0**
-	(United Kingdom) Roger Fursman	Norton			Ret								**0**
-	(Germany) Manfred Gäckle	Matchless	Ret										**0**
-	(United Kingdom) Albert Haddock	Triton			Ret								**0**
-	(United Kingdom) Mike Hailwood	Benelli										Ret	**0**
-	(Germany) Peter Hampe	Norton	Ret										**0**
-	(United Kingdom) Mick Hatherill	Matchless-Metisse			Ret								**0**
-	(United Kingdom) Keith Heckles	Norton			Ret								**0**
-	(Canada) Oliver Howe	Norton						Ret					**0**
-	(United Kingdom) Griff Jenkins	Matchless			Ret								**0**
-	(United Kingdom) John Jones	Triumph			Ret								**0**
-	(Northern Ireland) Brian Kemp	Triumph									Ret		**0**
-	(Germany) Willi Kern	Norton	Ret										**0**
-	(Estonian Soviet Socialist Republic) Endel Kiisa	Vostok								Ret			**0**
-	(Czech Republic) Stanislav Klatil	Jawa							Ret				**0**
-	(United Kingdom) Ray Knight	Hughes-Triumph			Ret								**0**
-	(Germany) Udo Konchanski	BMW	Ret										**0**
-	(Finland) Toivo Lehtinen	Norton								Ret			**0**
-	(Finland) Taneli Lepo	Matchless								Ret			**0**
-	(Italy) Vasco Loro	Norton										Ret	**0**
-	(United Kingdom) Pat Mahoney	Oakley-Matchless			Ret								**0**
-	(Italy) Emanuele Maugliani	Norton										Ret	**0**
-	(United Kingdom) Dennis May	Petty-Norton			Ret								**0**
-	(United Kingdom) Tony McGurk	Matchless			Ret								**0**
-	(Germany) Hans-Jürgen Melcher	Honda	Ret										**0**
-	(United Kingdom) David Menzies	Norton			Ret								**0**
-	(Italy) Gilberto Milani	Linto										Ret	**0**
-	(New Zealand) Ginger Molloy	Bultaco		Ret									**0**
-	(Northern Ireland) Stephen Murray	Matchless									Ret		**0**
-	(South Africa) Gart Neveling	Norton			Ret								**0**
-	(Finland) Ilari Pekkinen	Norton								Ret			**0**
-	(Italy) Giovanni Perrone	Matchless										Ret	**0**
-	(United Kingdom) Harry Reynolds	Matchless-Metisse			Ret								**0**
-	(United Kingdom) Tony Rutter	Norton			Ret								**0**
-	(United Kingdom) Brian Sapsford	Lyster-Norton			Ret								**0**
-	(Australia) Jack Saunders	Matchless						Ret					**0**
-	(United Kingdom) Peter Sheppard	Norton			Ret								**0**
-	(Italy) Bruno Spaggiari	Ducati		Ret									**0**
-	(United Kingdom) Steve Spencer	Norton	Ret										**0**
-	(Australia) Malcolm Stanton	Norton					Ret						**0**
-	(United Kingdom) John Taylor	Kirby-Matchless			Ret								**0**
-	(Germany) Rolf Thiemig	Norton	Ret										**0**
-	(United Kingdom) Colin Thompson	Norton			Ret								**0**
-	(Italy) Franco Trabalzini	Norton										Ret	**0**
-	(Northern Ireland) Harry Turner	Norton									Ret		**0**
-	(United Kingdom) Tom Walker	Triumph			Ret								**0**
-	(United Kingdom) Brian Walmsley	Norton			Ret								**0**
-	(Malta) John Wetherall	Norton			Ret								**0**
-	(United Kingdom) Lewis Young	Matchless							Ret				**0**
-	(Italy) Benedetto Zambotti	Bianchi										Ret	**0**
Pos	Rider	Bike	GER (Germany)	ESP (Spain)	MAN (United Kingdom)	HOL (Netherlands)	BEL (Belgium)	DDR (East Germany)	TCH (Czechoslovakia)	FIN (Finland)	ULS (Ulster)	NAC (Italy)	Pts

Colour	Result
Gold	Winner
Silver	Second place
Bronze	Third place
Green	Points classification
Blue	Non-points classification
Blue	Non-classified finish (NC)
Purple	Retired, not classified (Ret)
Red	Did not qualify (DNQ)
Red	Did not pre-qualify (DNPQ)
Black	Disqualified (DSQ)
White	Did not start (DNS)
White	Withdrew (WD)
White	Race cancelled (C)
Blank	Did not practice (DNP)
Blank	Did not arrive (DNA)
Blank	Excluded (EX)

**Bold** – Pole
Italics – Fastest Lap

=== 350cc Standings ===
Place	Rider	Number	Country	Machine	Points	Wins
1	(Italy) Giacomo Agostini		Italy	MV Agusta	32	7
2	(Italy) Renzo Pasolini		Italy	Benelli	18	0
3	(Australia) Kel Carruthers		Australia	Aermacchi	17	0
4	(East Germany) Heinz Rosner		East Germany	MZ	12	0
=	(New Zealand) Ginger Molloy		New Zealand	Bultaco	12	0
6	(United Kingdom) Derek Woodman		United Kingdom	Aermacchi	9	0
7	(Czechoslovakia) František Šťastný		Czechoslovakia	Jawa	8	0
8	(Czechoslovakia) Bohumil Staša		Czechoslovakia	ČZ	7	0
9	(United Kingdom) Bill Smith		United Kingdom	Honda	4	0
=	(Italy) Gilberto Milani		Italy	Aermacchi	4	0
=	(United Kingdom) Brian Steenson		United Kingdom	Aermacchi	4	0
=	(Italy) Silvio Grassetti		Italy	Benelli	4	0
13	(United Kingdom) Billie Nelson		United Kingdom	Norton	3	0
14	(United Kingdom) Dan Shorey		United Kingdom	Norton	2	0
=	(United Kingdom) John Cooper		United Kingdom	Seeley	2	0
=	(West Germany) Karl Hoppe		West Germany	Aermacchi	2	0
=	(Italy) Bruno Spaggiari		Italy	Ducati	2	0
18	(Australia) Jack Findlay		Australia	Aermacchi	1	0
=	(United Kingdom) Dave Simmonds		United Kingdom	Kawasaki	1	0

=== 250cc Standings ===
Place	Rider	Number	Country	Machine	Points	Wins
1	(United Kingdom) Phil Read		United Kingdom	Yamaha	46	5
2	(United Kingdom) Bill Ivy		United Kingdom	Yamaha	46	5
3	(East Germany) Heinz Rosner		East Germany	MZ	32	0
4	(United Kingdom) Rodney Gould		United Kingdom	Yamaha	21	0
5	(New Zealand) Ginger Molloy		New Zealand	Bultaco	19	0
6	(Italy) Renzo Pasolini		Italy	Benelli	10	0
7	(Spain) Santiago Herrero		Spain	Ossa	8	0
8	(Sweden) Kent Andersson		Sweden	Yamaha	6	0
9	(United Kingdom) Malcolm Uphill		United Kingdom	Suzuki	5	0
=	(Hungary) László Szabó		Hungary	MZ	5	0
=	(Australia) Jack Findlay		Australia	Bultaco	5	0
12	(Spain) Carlos Giró-Vila		Spain	Ossa	3	0
=	(Rhodesia) Gordon Keith		Rhodesia	Yamaha	3	0
14	(Spain) Carlos Rocamora		Spain	Bultaco	2	0
=	(Italy) Gilberto Milani		Italy	Aermacchi	2	0
16	(West Germany) Paul Eickelberg		West Germany	Aermacchi	1	0
=	(United Kingdom) Bill Smith		United Kingdom	Yamaha	1	0
=	(Switzerland) Gyula Marsovsky		Switzerland	Bultaco	1	0
=	(United Kingdom) Rex Butcher		United Kingdom	Suzuki	1	0

=== 125cc Standings ===
Place	Rider	Number	Country	Machine	Points	Wins
1	(United Kingdom) Phil Read		United Kingdom	Yamaha	40	6
2	(United Kingdom) Bill Ivy		United Kingdom	Yamaha	34	2
3	(New Zealand) Ginger Molloy		New Zealand	Bultaco	15	0
4	(East Germany) Heinz Rosner		East Germany	MZ	12	0
5	(Spain) Salvador Cañellas		Spain	Bultaco	11	1
6	(Hungary) László Szabó		Hungary	MZ	11	0
=	(West Germany) Dieter Braun		West Germany	MZ-Neckermann	11	0
8	(West Germany) Hans-Georg Anscheidt		West Germany	Suzuki	10	0
9	(East Germany) Günter Bartusch		East Germany	MZ	8	0
10	(Australia) Kel Carruthers		Australia	Honda	6	0
11	(United Kingdom) Tommy Robb		United Kingdom	Bultaco	5	0
12	(West Germany) Siegfried Möhringer		West Germany	MZ-Neckermann	4	0
=	(Netherlands) Jan Huberts		Netherlands	MZ	4	0
14	(West Germany) Walter Scheimann		West Germany	Honda	3	0
=	(East Germany) Friedhelm Kohlar		East Germany	MZ	3	0
=	(United Kingdom) Dave Simmonds		United Kingdom	Kawasaki	3	0
17	(Sweden) Kent Andersson		Sweden	MZ	2	0
=	(Rhodesia) Gordon Keith		Rhodesia	Montesa	2	0
=	(East Germany) Hartmut Bischoff		East Germany	MZ	2	0
=	(West Germany) Lothar John		West Germany	MZ	2	0
=	(East Germany) Jürgen Lenk		East Germany	MZ	2	0
=	(East Germany) Thomas Heuschkel		East Germany	MZ	2	0
23	(Spain) Pedro Alvarez		Spain	Bultaco	1	0
=	(United Kingdom) Steve Murray		United Kingdom	Honda	1	0
=	(Italy) Giuseppe Visenzi		Italy	Montesa	1	0
=	(Hungary) János Reisz		Hungary	MZ	1	0

=== 50cc Standings ===
Place	Rider	Number	Country	Machine	Points	Wins
1	(West Germany) Hans-Georg Anscheidt		West Germany	Suzuki	30	3
2	(Netherlands) Paul Lodewijkx		Netherlands	Jamathi	17	1
3	(Australia) Barry Smith		Australia	Derbi	15	1
4	(Spain) Angel Nieto		Spain	Derbi	10	0
5	(West Germany) Rudolf Kunz		West Germany	Kreidler	6	0
=	(United Kingdom) Chris Walpole		United Kingdom	Honda	6	0
=	(West Germany) Rudolf Schmälzle		West Germany	Kreidler	6	0
8	(United Kingdom) Leslie Griffiths		United Kingdom	Honda	4	0
=	(Netherlands) Aalt Toersen		Netherlands	Kreidler	4	0
10	(West Germany) Ludwig Faßbender		West Germany	Kreidler	3	0
=	(United Kingdom) Brian Lock		United Kingdom	Honda	3	0
=	(Netherlands) Jan de Vries		Netherlands	Kreidler	3	0
13	(Netherlands) Cees van Dongen		Netherlands	Kreidler	2	0
=	(Spain) Carlos Giró-Vila		Spain	Derbi	2	0
=	(United Kingdom) Jim Pink		United Kingdom	Honda	2	0
=	(Netherlands) Jos Schurgers		Netherlands	Kreidler	2	0
=	(Netherlands) Martin Mijwaart		Netherlands	Jamathi	2	0
18	(Socialist Federal Republic of Yugoslavia) Janco Florjan-Stefe		Yugoslavia	Tomos	1	0
=	(Spain) Francisco Cufi		Spain	Derbi	1	0
=	(United Kingdom) Robin Udall		United Kingdom	Honda	1	0
