= Jan Huberts =

Dutch motorcycle racer

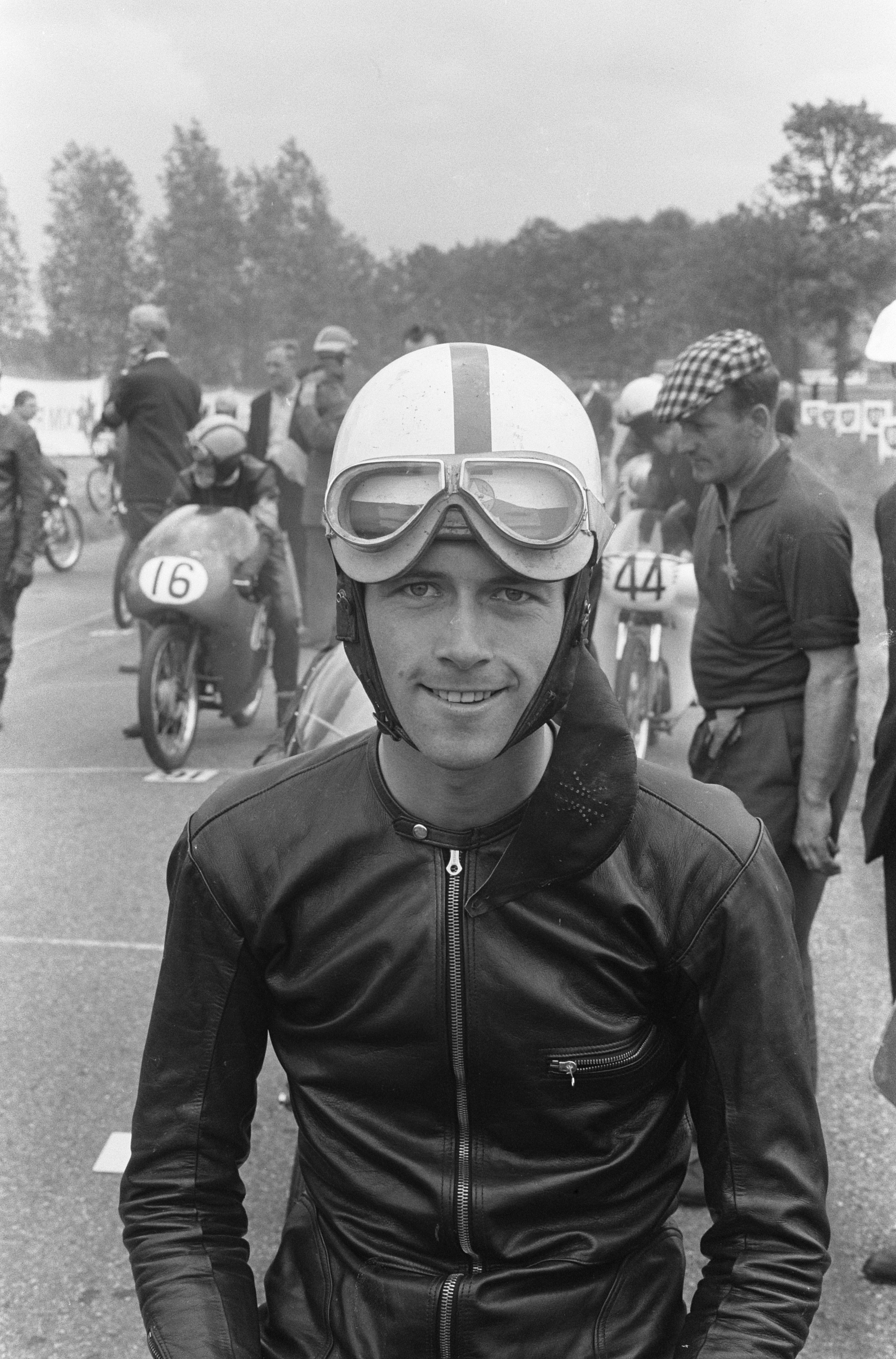
- Nationality: Dutch
- Born: 12 October 1937; Delfzijl, Netherlands
- Died: 19 November 2016 (aged 79); Rijswijk, Netherlands
Motorcycle racing career statistics
Grand Prix motorcycle racing
Active years	1960 - 1962, 1968 - 1969, 1971 - 1975, 1977, 1979
First race	1960 50cc Dutch TT
Last race	1979 125cc Belgian Grand Prix
First win	1962 50cc French Grand Prix
Last win	1962 50cc East German Grand Prix
Team	Kreidler
Championships	0
Starts / Wins / Podiums / Poles / F. laps / Points; 37 / 2 / 5 / 0 / 3 / 138

Jan Huberts (12 October 1937 – 19 November 2016) was a Grand Prix motorcycle road racer from the Netherlands. He had his best year in 1962 when he won two Grand Prix races and finished the season in third place behind Ernst Degner and Hans-Georg Anscheidt.

Huberts is holder of the official world speed record for 50cc motorcycles.

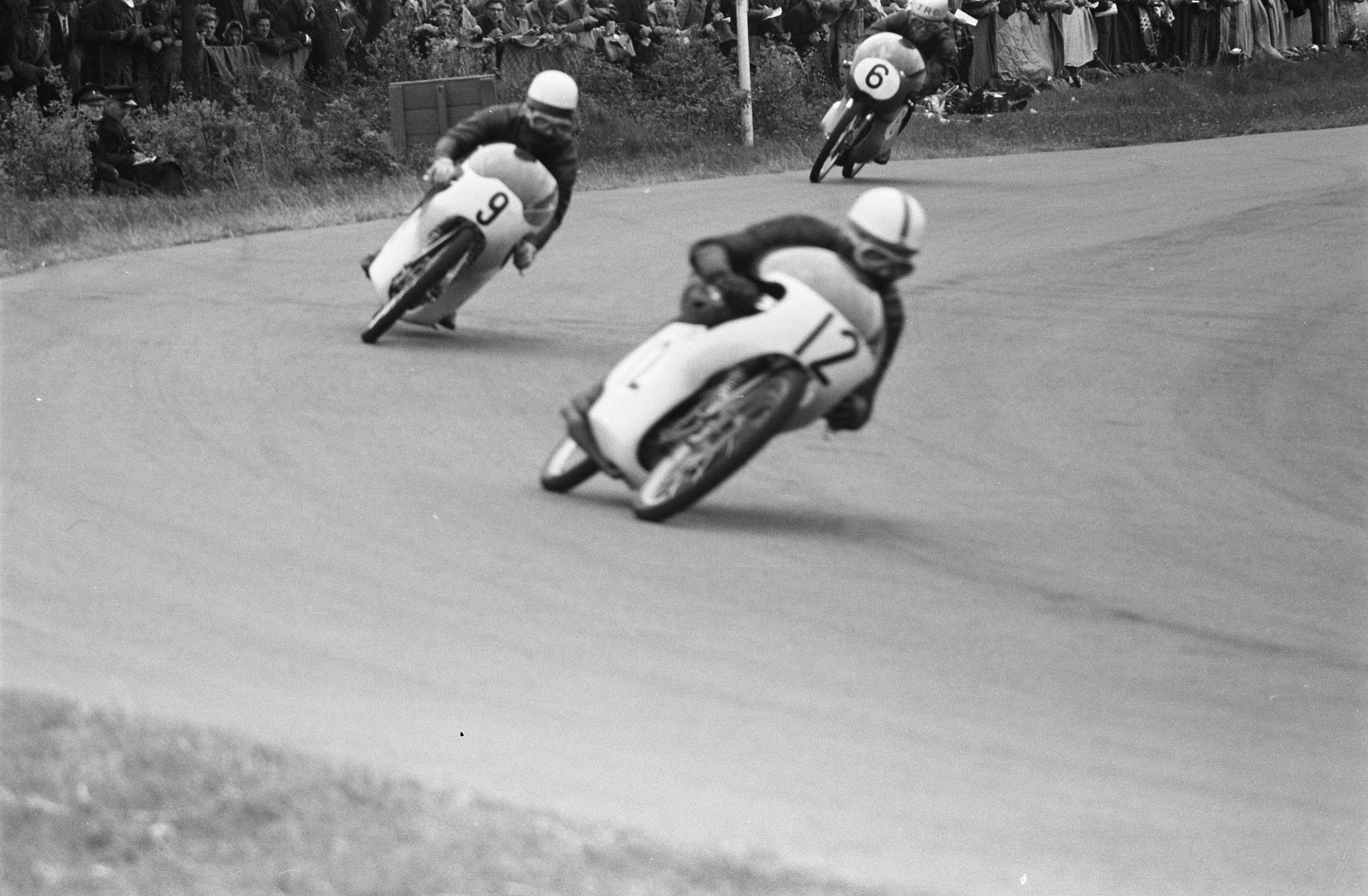
Huberts (12) leads Hans-Georg Anscheidt (9) and Seiiche Suzuki (6) during the 1962 50cc Dutch TT.

Huberts owned and managed a motorcycle racing team. His team contested the 500cc world championship between 1999 and 2001 using Honda NSR500V bikes.
