= Schottenring =

Race track in Schotten, Germany

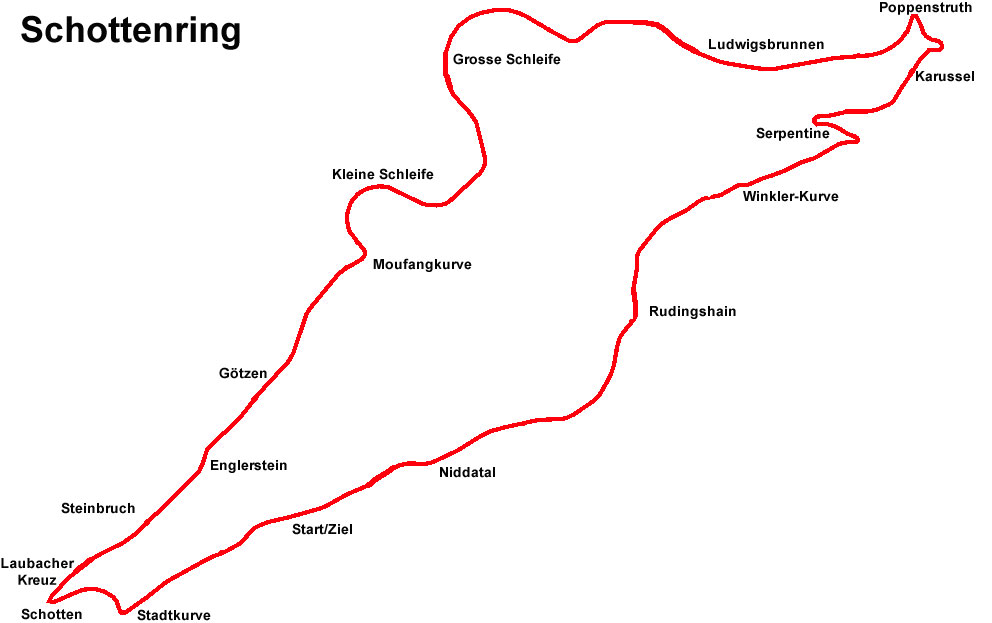
- Location: Schotten, Germany
- Coordinates: 50°29′51″N 9°7′6″E
- Opened: 22 July 1925; 100 years ago
- Closed: 1956
- Major events: Grand Prix motorcycle racing German motorcycle Grand Prix (1953)
- Website: https://www.schottenring.de/
- Length: 16.080 km (9.992 miles)

The Schottenring was a motorsport race track situated near Schotten in the Vogelsbergkreis of Hesse, between Fulda and Gießen. After Nürburgring, Schleizer Dreieck, Solituderennen and AVUS, it was one of Germany's oldest race tracks, inaugurated on 22 July 1925.

The track was popular for club events, and had attracted 90,000 spectators to its first post war event in 1947. In 1953, partially as the result of a compromise between Germany's two controlling bodies, the DMV and the ADAC, it was selected to host the German motorcycle Grand Prix. Even by the standards of the day, the track had never been regarded as particularly safe, and after an inspection made before practice had begun, the factory teams from AJS, Norton, Gilera and Moto Guzzi decided unanimously that the track was too narrow for "modern" 350s and 500s to race. It was bordered on many fast corners by trees and had a track surface so slippery at the most dangerous points that it would be disastrous to run a championship event there. With the unprecedented departure of the majority of major teams even before racing was due to begin, officials from the FIM decided that the only way to proceed at such short notice was to allow the event to continue, but that only the smaller 125cc and 250cc races would count towards the World Championship.

Racing was discontinued after 1956, but rallies, classic bikes and hillclimbing events are still held on a shortened version.
