= Prophete =

Prophete In Moving GmbH
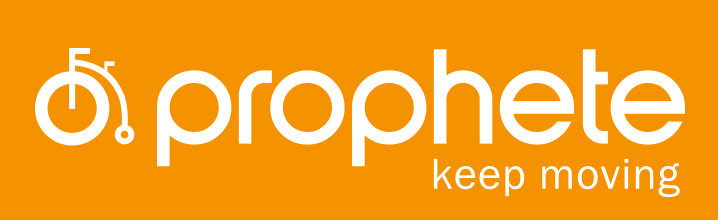
- Industry: Bicycles
- Founded: 1908; 118 years ago in Halle an der Saale, Germany
- Founder: Hermann Paul Prophete
- Headquarters: Rheda-Wiedenbrück (North Rhine-Westphalia), Germany
- Key people: Rui Xu, Dr. Michael Dorin, Thomas Mouhlen
- Products: bicycles, e-bikes, scooters, bike supplies
- Owner: Dutech Holdings (SG)
- Number of employees: about 460 (in 2022)
- Website: Prophete

Prophete In Moving GmbH is a German manufacturer for bicycles, e-bikes, scooters, and supply parts that traditionally trade under the Prophete keep moving brand name.

The company (including the subsidiary company Cycle Union) employ a staff of about 400 people at 4 production sites. In December 2022, the company declared bankruptcy.

== History ==
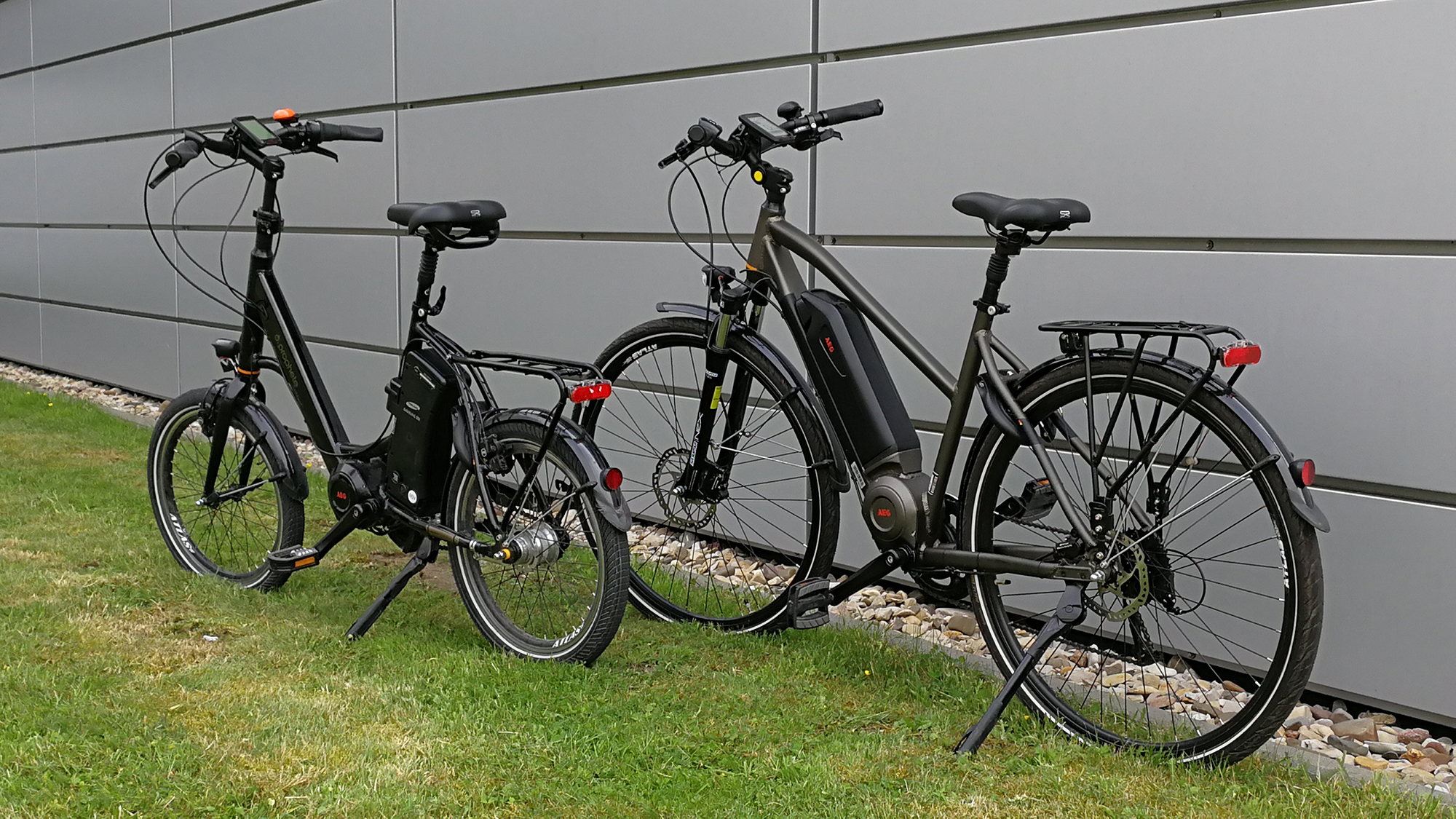
Prophete e-bikes with motorization by AEG

The company started out in 1908 as a bicycle workshop based in Halle an der Saale, but at the end of World War II the Prophete family moved the company to Rheda-Wiedenbrück in West Germany and expanded the operation to include wholesaling and importation of bicycles. By the 1970s the company had become the main supplier of bicycles to German supermarkets and mail order houses which eventually led to the company starting to manufacture bicycle frames and other parts in its own factories in order to ensure stabler supplies.

In 1995 the company formed a subsidiary called SI-Zweirad-Vertriebs-GmbH in order to enter the market for small motorcycles and mopeds. Later that same year the company bought the rights to the Kreidler brand name and started importing and selling mopeds, motorcycles and quadbikes under the Kreidler and Rex names, however unlike their bicycles the mopeds and motorcycles were actually sourced from Asia.

The company hit some snags in 2003 when a number of their smaller two-stroke engined mopeds fell afoul of tighter EU emission regulations and the Kreidler brand name actually disappeared from some markets for a while.

A new subsidiary called Cycle Union was formed to handle all of the brands that Prophete had been distributing through specialised motorcycle and bicycle stores. Kreidler mopeds started appearing in shops again in 2007/2008. Cycle Union is based in Oldenburg, in addition to Kreidler it owns and operates brands such as Epple (bicycle manufacturer based in Memmingen, which Prophete bought in 2004) and Rabeneick and the flagship VSF Fahrradmanufaktur in addition to distributing other brands. Cycle Union manufactures all their products on site in Oldenburg and has invested in a powder coating line for the purpose.

Prophete itself had sold bicycles, but these were exclusively distributed through supermarkets, department stores and mail order houses, as well as the online store rather than specialised retailers.

In December 2022 the company declared bankruptcy. On March 3, 2023, it was announced that Singapore base investor Dutech Holdings has become new shareholder of Prophete and Cycle Union

== Brands ==
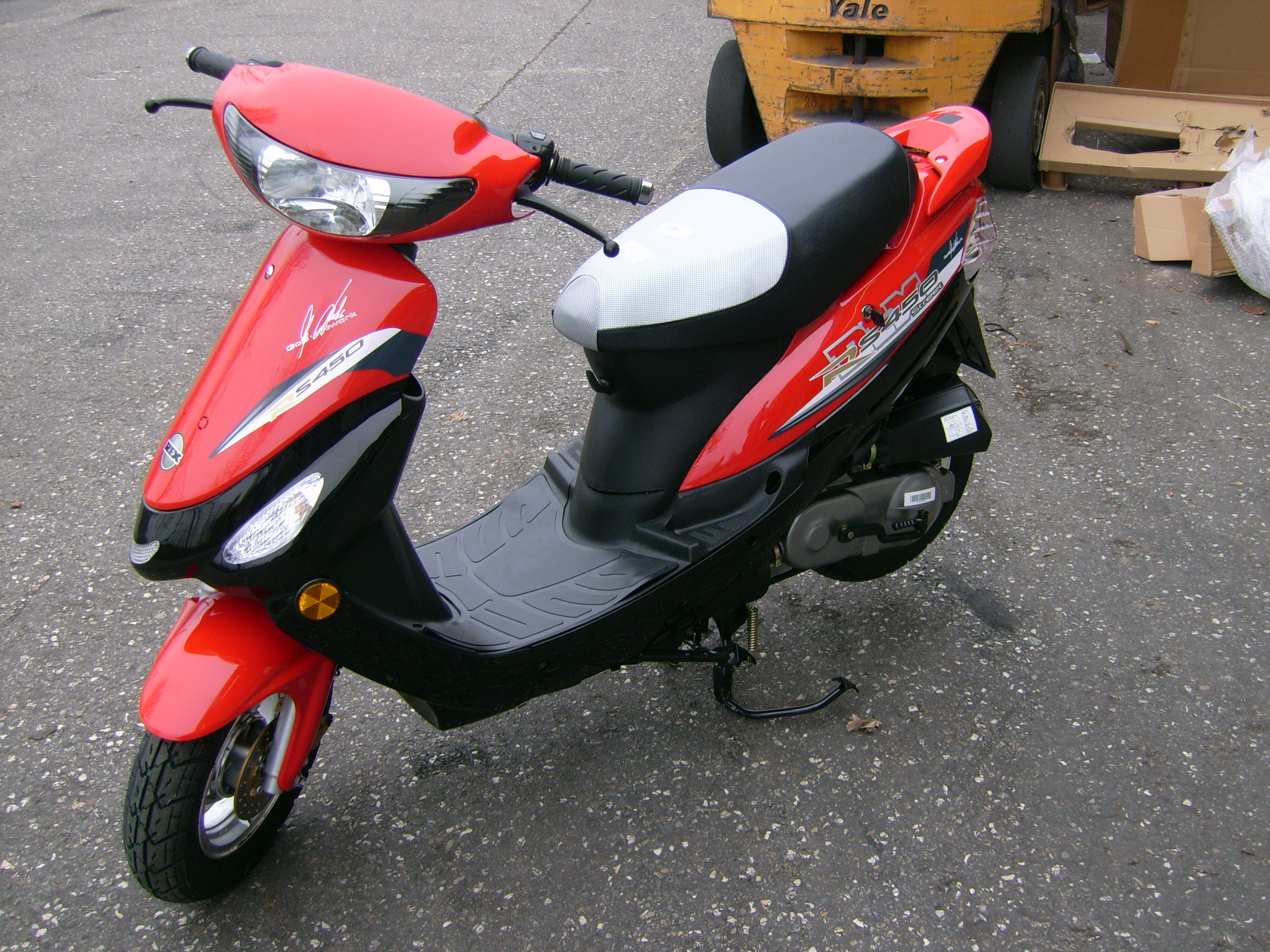
Rex RS450 Scooter

Brand	Product(s)	administered by
Capriolo	Motorcycles and scooters	SI-Zweirad
Epple	Bicycles	Cycle Union
Konbike	low budget bicycles	Prophete
Kreidler	Motorcycles and scooters	Cycle Union
Mountec	sport bicycles	Prophete
Noblesse	classical style bicycles	Prophete
Off-Limit	Scooters (only used in 2007/08)	SI-Zweirad
Prophete	Bicycles, spare parts and supplies	Prophete
Rabeneick	Bicycles	Cycle Union
Rex	Bicycles, motorcycles, scooters, quadbikes and supplies	Prophete/SI-Zweirad
Scooter	Scooters (used in 2007 and since 2009)	SI-Zweirad
Stratos	Racing cycles	Prophete
Topsy	Bicycles for children	Prophete
VSF Fahrradmanufaktur	Bicycles	Cycle Union
