= Kreidler Florett RS =

German moped model

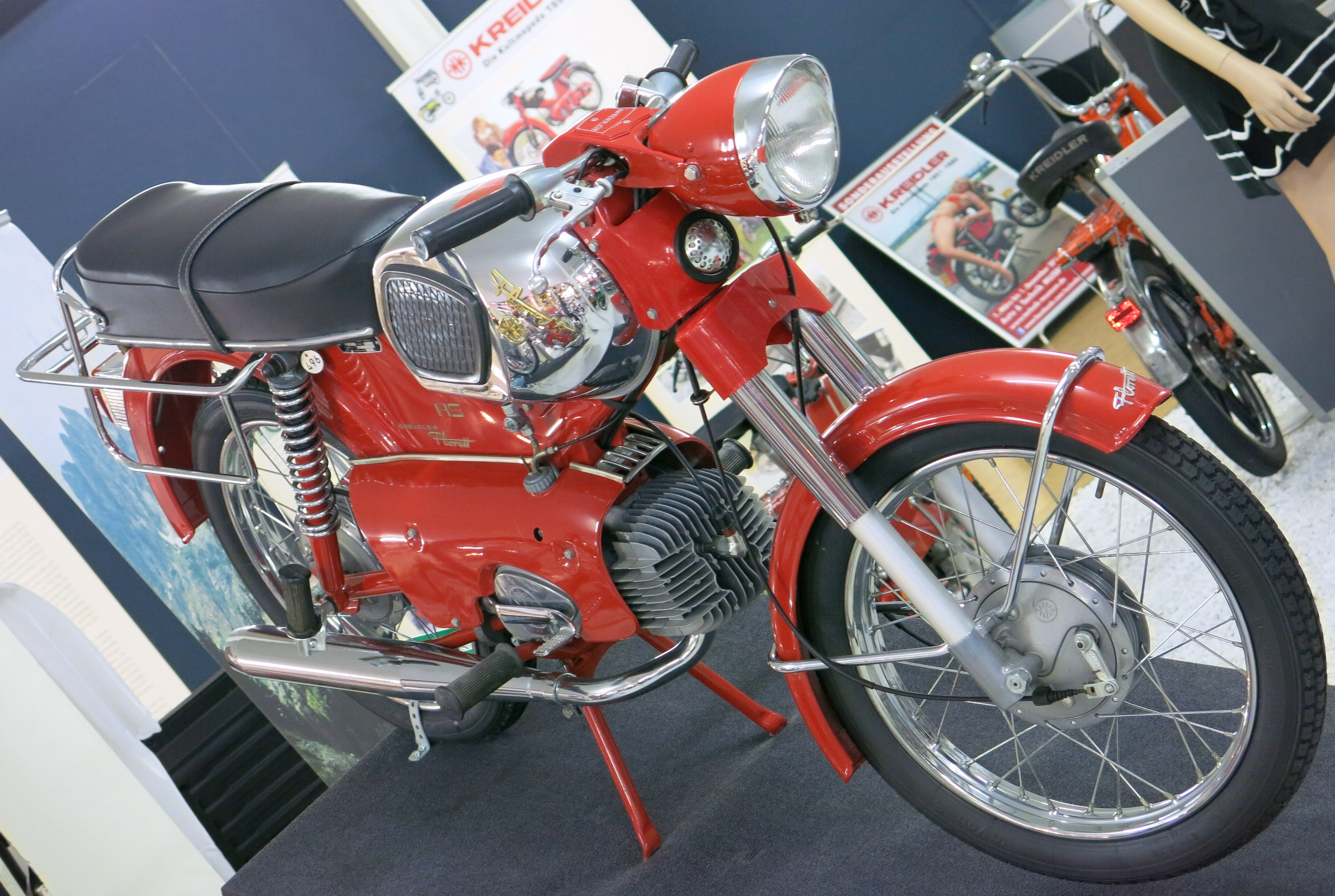
Kreidler Florett RS (1970)

Kreidler Florett RS was a German moped of Kreidler's Metall- und Drahtwerke G.m.b.H. in Kornwestheim near Stuttgart (Germany), of which 125,000 units were built between 1967 and 1981. The Florett RS was the fastest offering in the Kreidler lineup and a competent competitor to such contemporaries as the Hercules K 50 and Zündapp KS 50.

== Specifications ==
Small motorcycles with up to 50 cm^{3} capacity were exempt from taxes and licence plates and could be driven with a Class 4 driving licence with a minimum age of 16 years. To stop the competitive spiral, the three leading manufacturers Kreidler, Hercules and Zündapp agreed 1970 to a voluntary limitation of the 50-cm^{3} class to 6,25 PS and a gearbox with a maximum of 5 gears.

== Bibliography ==
- Frank O. Hrachowy: Kreidler. Geschichte-Typen-Technik. (in German) 1. Auflage. Verlag Johann Kleine Vennekate, Lemgo 2009, ISBN 978-3-935517-45-4.
