= Hans-Georg Anscheidt =

German motorcycle racer (born 1935)

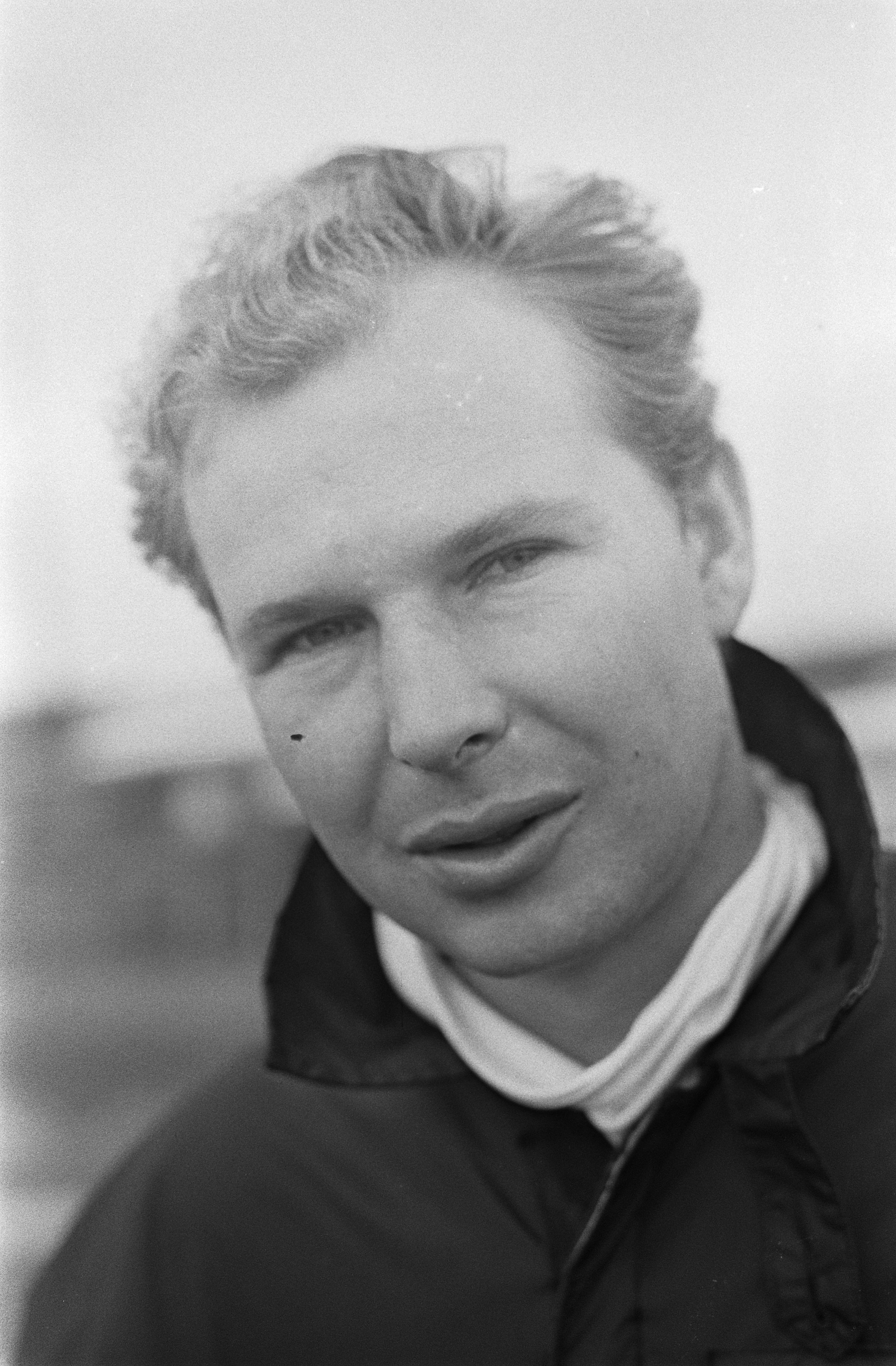
- Hans Georg Anscheidt in 1968
- Nationality: German
- Born: 23 December 1935 (age 90); Königsberg, Nazi Germany (now Kaliningrad, Russia)
Motorcycle racing career statistics
MotoGP World Championship
Active years	1962 - 1968
Manufacturers	Suzuki
Championships	50 cc - 1966, 1967, 1968
First Grand Prix	1962 50 cc Spanish Grand Prix
First win	1962 50 cc Spanish Grand Prix
Last win	1968 50 cc Belgian Grand Prix
Last Grand Prix	1968 50 cc Belgian Grand Prix
Starts / Wins / Podiums / Poles / F. laps / Points; 48 / 14 / 34 / N/A / 12 / 211

Hans-Georg Anscheidt (born 23 December 1935) is a German retired Grand Prix motorcycle road racing World Champion. He won three consecutive FIM 50 cc world championships from 1966 to 1968 as a member of the Suzuki factory racing team.

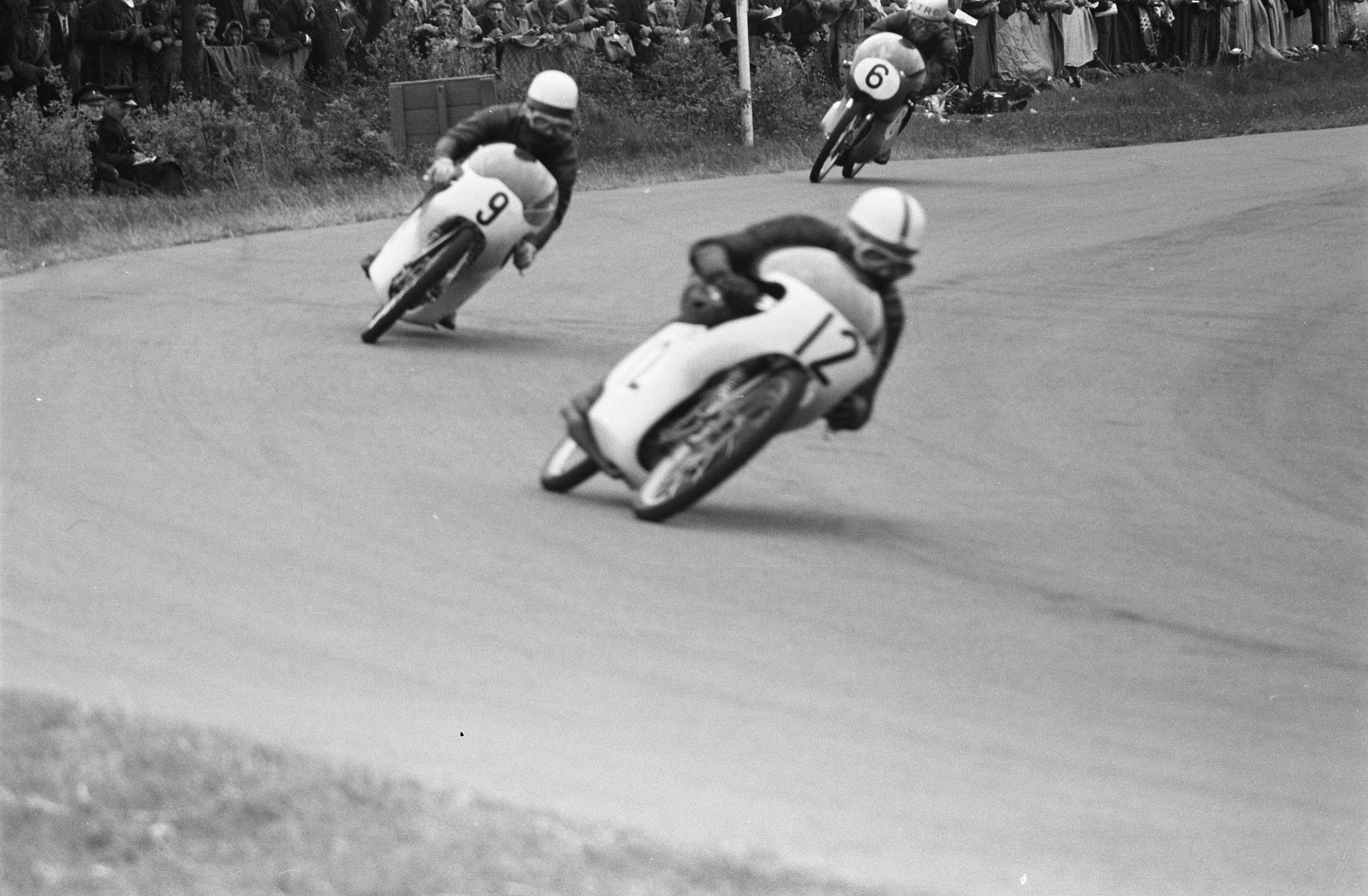
Anscheidt (9) and Seiiche Suzuki (6) pursue Jan Huberts (12) during the 1962 50cc Dutch TT.

On 15 June 2023, Anscheidt was inducted as a member of the MotoGP Legends.
