= Kreidler =

German manufacturer of small motorcycles and mopeds

- Company type: Private
- Industry: Bicycles, mopeds, motorcycles
- Founded: 1903
- Founder: Anton Kreidler
- Defunct: 1982 (original company)
- Headquarters: Kornwestheim, Germany
- Area served: Europe
- Products: Bicycles, mopeds, motorcycles
- Owner: Prophete / Cycle Union GmbH (current brand owner)

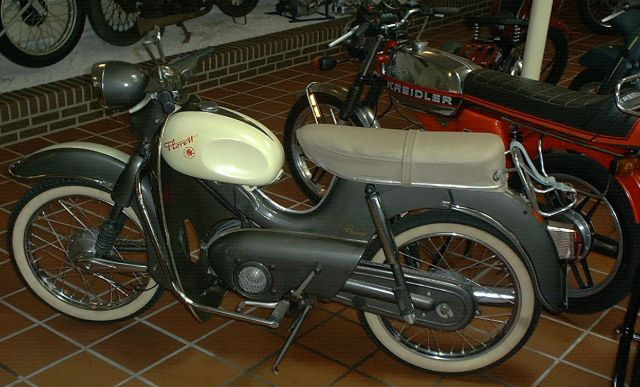
1950s and '70s examples of the 50 cc Kreidler Florett

Kreidler was a German manufacturer of bicycles, mopeds and motorcycles.

Kreidler was originally based in Kornwestheim, between Ludwigsburg and Stuttgart. It was founded in 1903 as "Kreidlers Metall- und Drahtwerke" (Kreidlers metal and wire factory) by Anton Kreidler and started to build motorcycles in 1951. In 1959 one third of all German motorcycles were Kreidler. In the 1970s Kreidler had very great success in motorsport. Especially in the Netherlands the riders Jan de Vries and Henk van Kessel were successful.

Kreidler went out of business in 1982 and the rights to the trade mark were sold to the businessman Rudolf Scheidt who had Italian manufacturer Garelli Motorcycles make mopeds under the Kreidler name until 1988. The rights to the Kreidler brand were subsequently acquired by bicycle manufacturer Prophete. Today the brand is used by Prophete's subsidiary Cycle Union GmbH based in Oldenburg, Germany, where bikes are built and distributed to dealers mainly throughout Europe.

Kreidler was active in Grand Prix motorcycle with great success in the 1970s and 1980s, scoring seven world champion titles in 50 cc class:

- 1971 Jan de Vries
- 1973 Jan de Vries
- 1974 Henk van Kessel
- 1975 Ángel Nieto
- 1979 Eugenio Lazzarini
- 1980 Eugenio Lazzarini
- 1982 Stefan Dörflinger

== Gallery ==
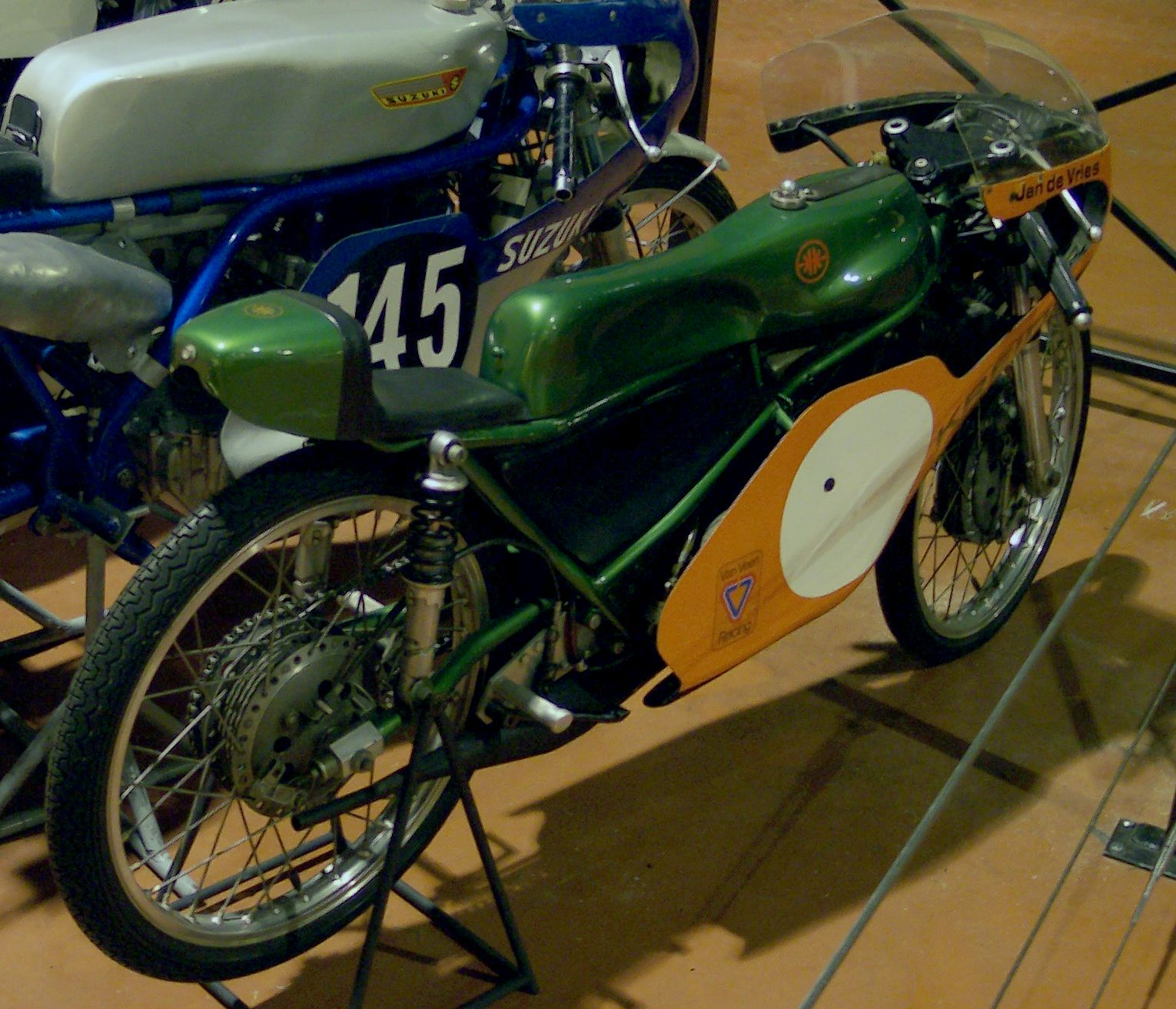
Van Veen Racing Kreidler of Jan de Vries (1971)

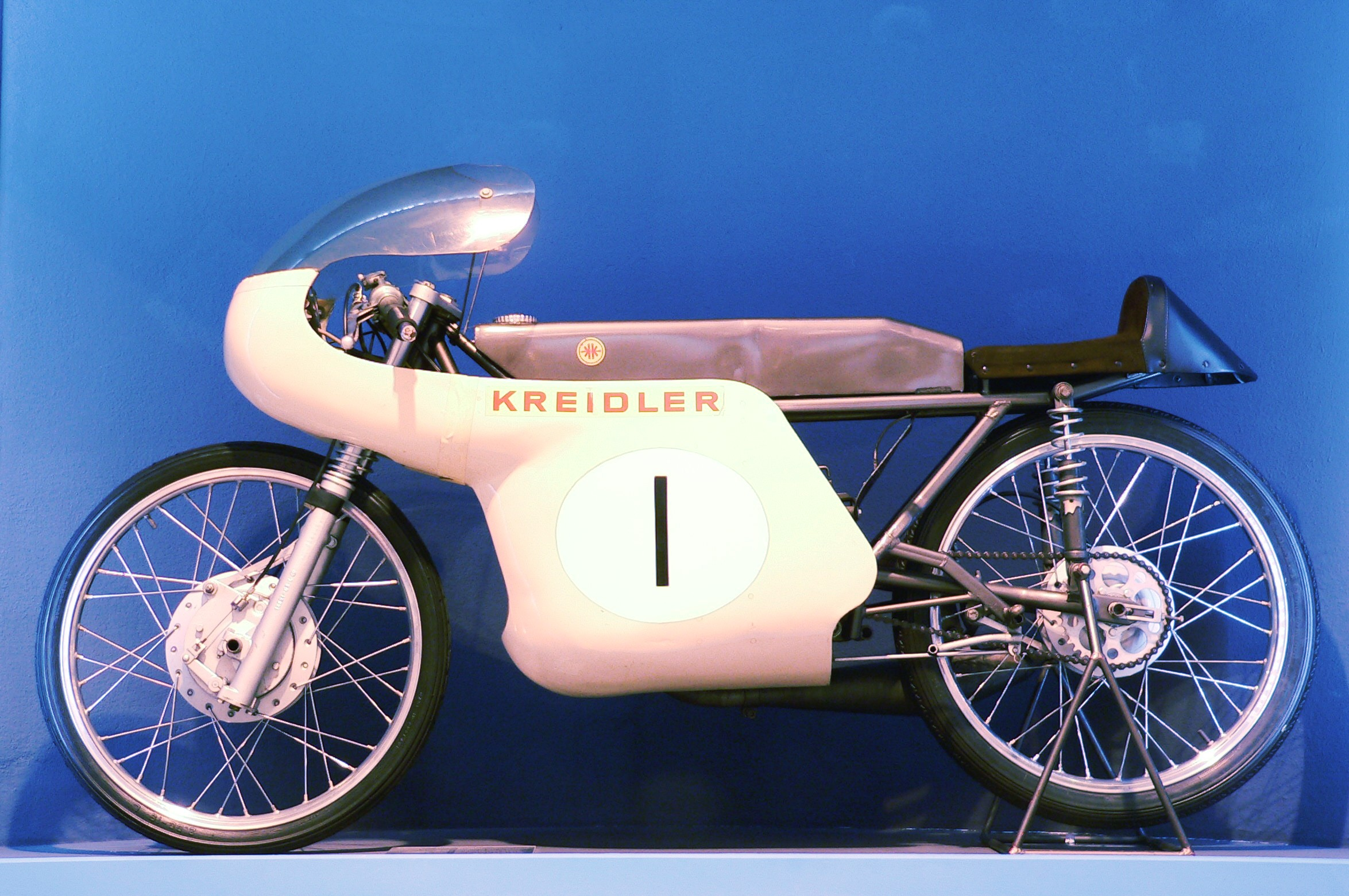
"Kreidler Racing Florett" (1963)

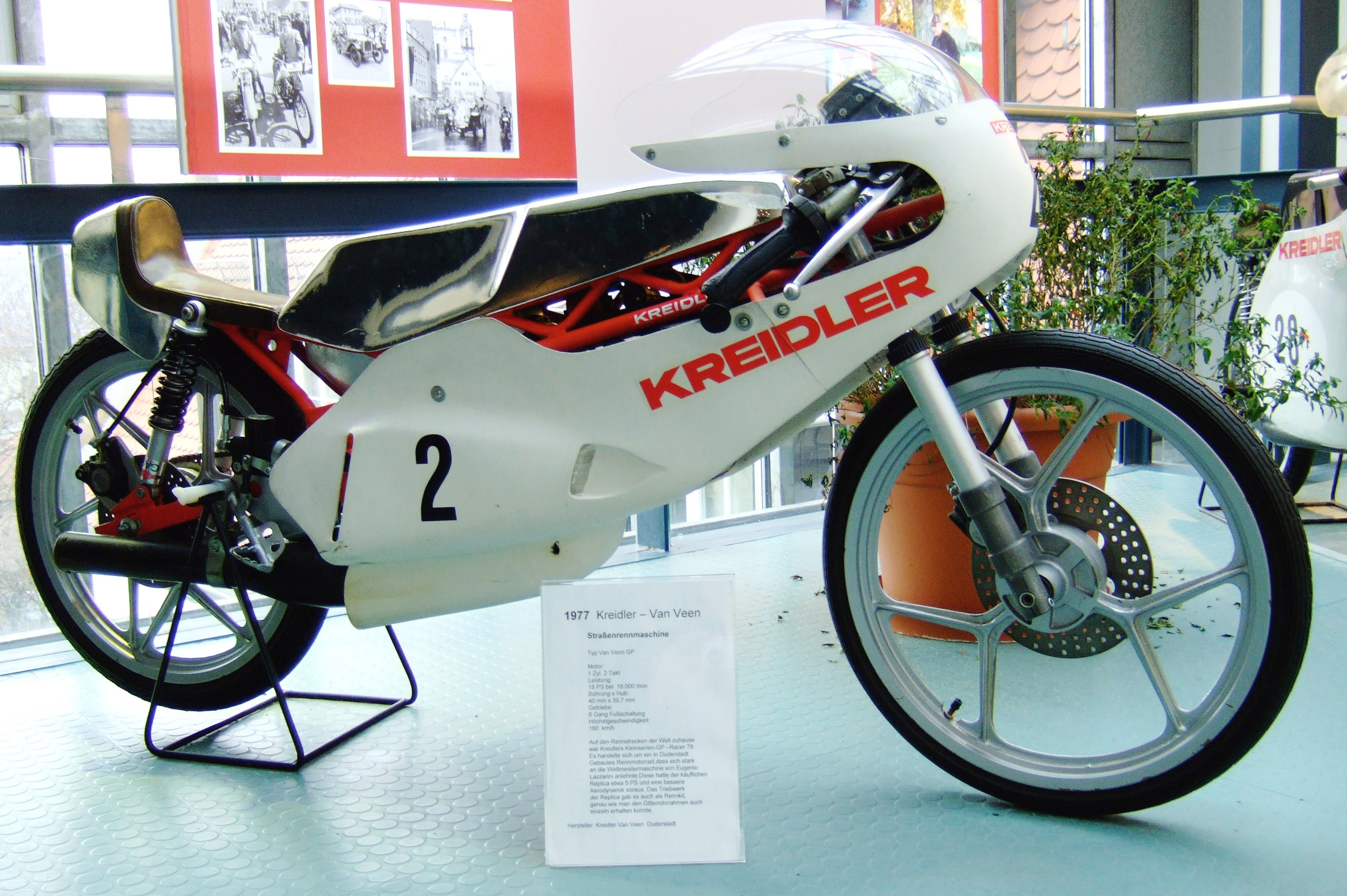
"Kreidler Van Veen GP" (1977)

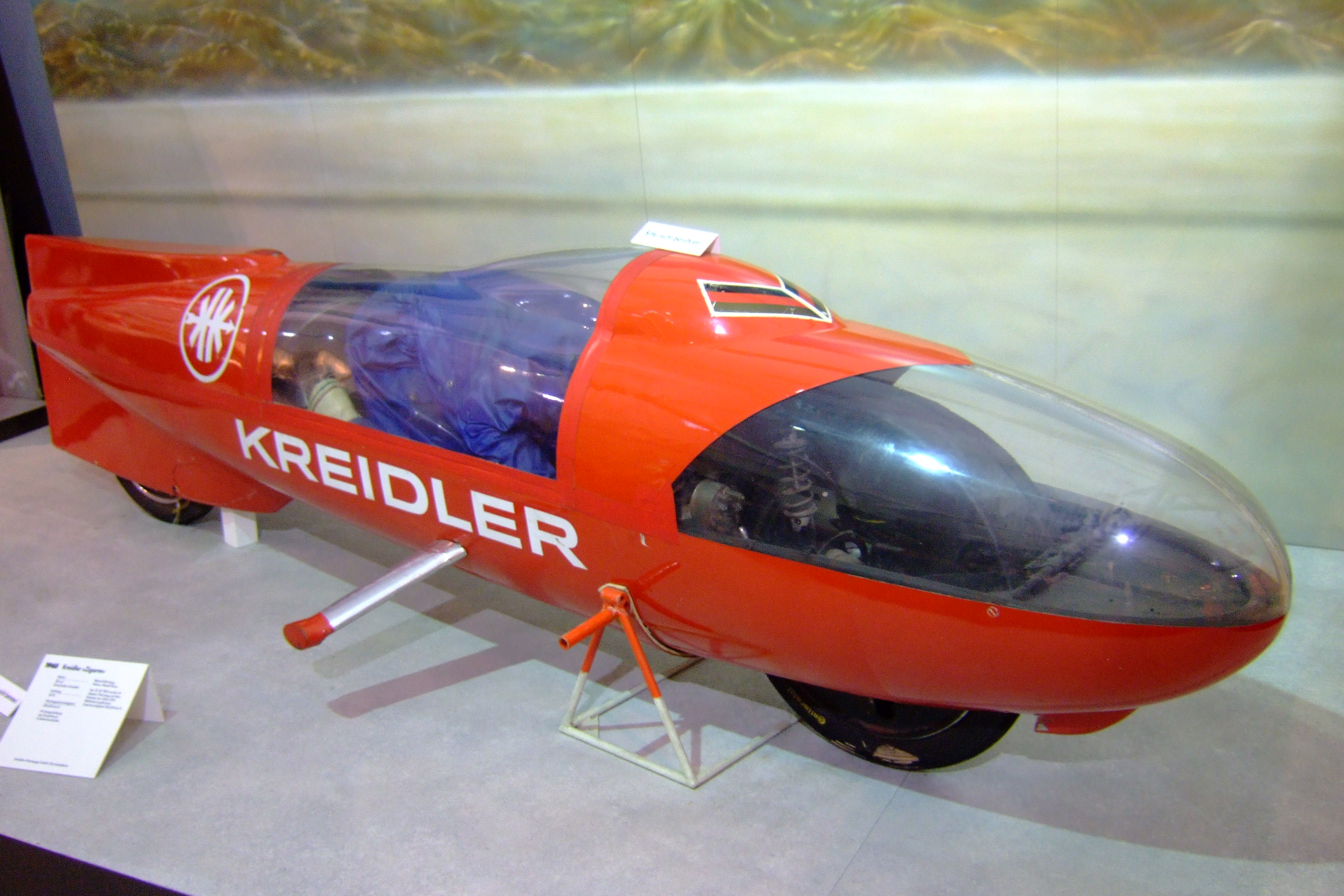
"Kreidler Zigarre" (50 cm^{3}, record: 210.634 km/h 23 October 1965, Utah, USA)

== See also ==
- Kreidler Florett RS
