= Solitude Racetrack =

German race track

Solitudering
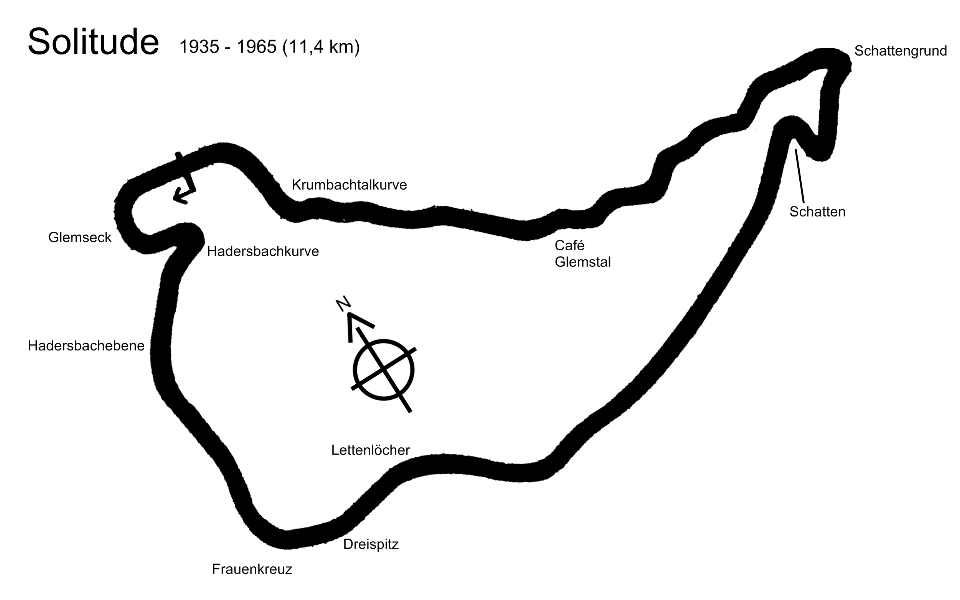
- Grand Prix Circuit (1935–1965)
- Location: Solitude Palace, Germany
- Coordinates: 48°46′04″N 9°02′45″E
- Opened: 1935
- Closed: 1965
- Major events: Grand Prix motorcycle racing German motorcycle Grand Prix (1952, 1954, 1956, 1960, 1962, 1964); Sidecar World Championship (1952, 1954, 1956, 1960, 1962, 1964); Solituderennen (1960–1965)
- Website: https://solitude-revival.org/

Grand Prix Circuit (1935–1965)
- Length: 11.4086 km (7.0890 mi)
- Race lap record: 3:49.100 ( (United Kingdom) Jim Clark, Lotus 25, 1963, F1)

Original Grand Prix Circuit (1925–1930)
- Length: 22.300 km (13.857 mi)
- Race lap record: 13:23.300 ( (Germany) Christian Werner, Mercedes 1924 GP, 1926, FL)

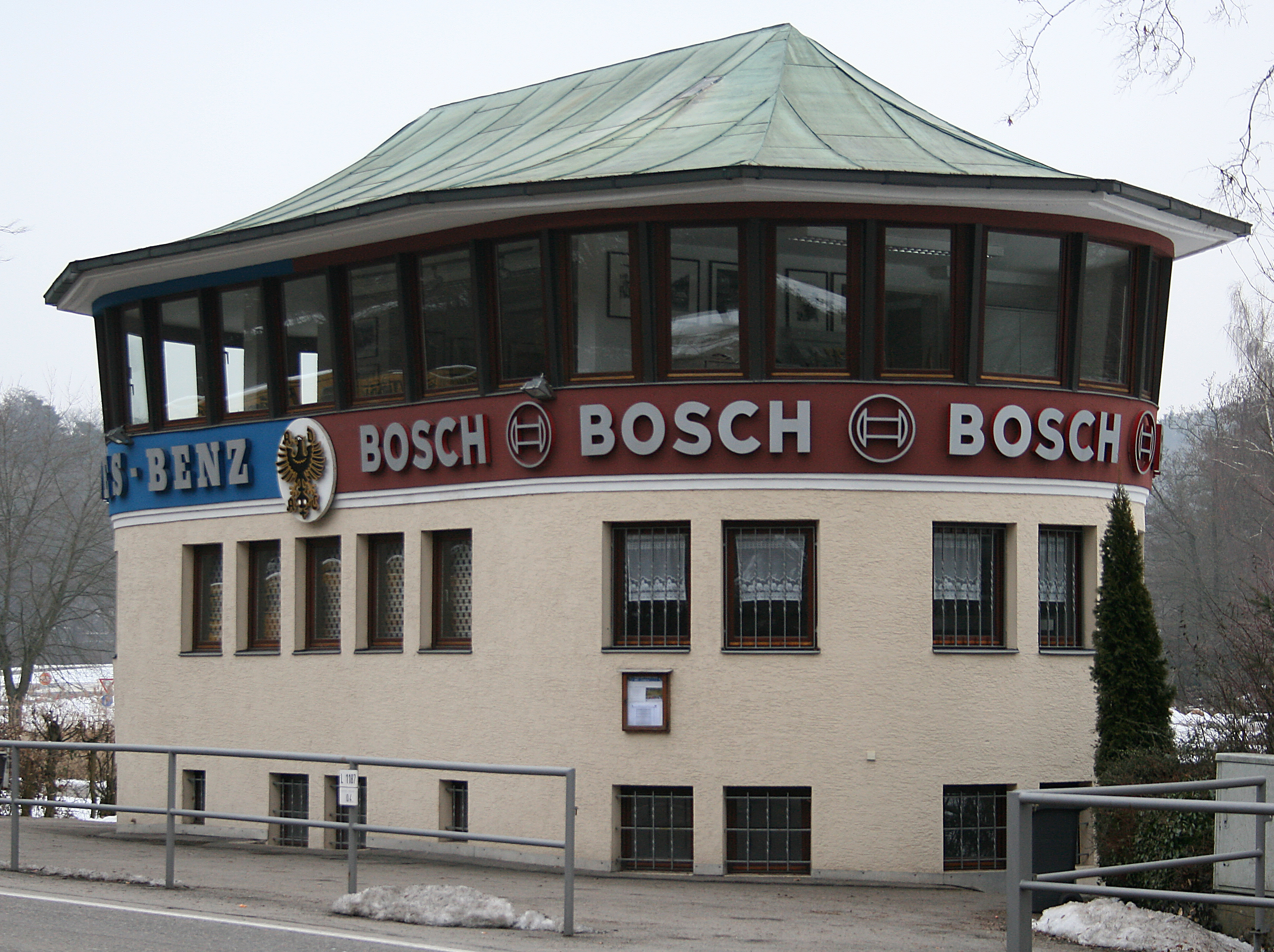
Control tower at the start-finish line in Mahdental

The Solitude racetrack is an 11.4086 km (7.089 mi) race circuit on public roads used for motorsport in the Leonberg area, west of Stuttgart, Germany. It is named after Castle Solitude and until 1965 has hosted various motorcycle and automobile races.

== Routes ==
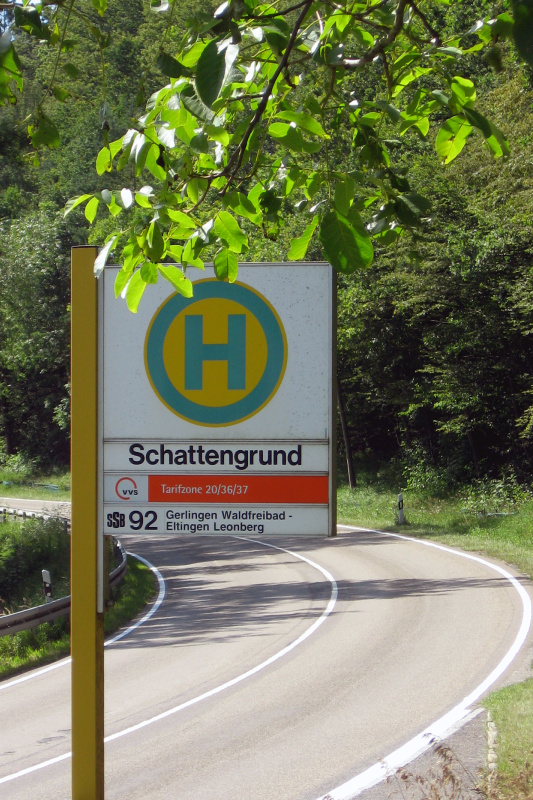
Shadow ground

The traditional track used for motorcycle racing is located above the Bergheim district of Stuttgart, but not in the center of the most important 11.4086 km (7.089 mi) long variant of the former race track. This variant leads from the start and finish house at today's ADAC training ground past the Seehaus and then past the Glemseck near Leonberg to Frauenkreuz. From there it continues in the direction of Katzenbacher Hof with the Steinbachsee, past the Büsnau district of Stuttgart to the Schattengrund and through the Mahdental back to start and finish before Glemseck. The section from Schattengrund to Glemseck runs in the valley of the Glems.

== History ==
- From 1903: First hillclimb track from Stuttgart Westbahnhof (west train station) to Solitude Castle.
- From 1906: The start was moved from Westbahnhof to Heslach, a southern district of Stuttgart.
- From 1925: Circuit with a length of 22.300 km (13.857 mi), start and finish at the castle. Direction: counterclockwise.
- From 1931: The circuit was shortened using the road through the Mahdental. Start and finish was moved to the west. Direction: clockwise.
- From 1935: Final circuit layout: The route introduced 1931 through Mahdental plus the part excluded in 1931 form the 11.4086 km (7.089 mi) course used until 1965. Direction: counterclockwise.
- Around 100-year celebration at 4 km (2.5 mi) short route around the castle, but still at historic track parts
- 1965: Races of motorcycles, sports cars and Formula 2 cars mark the final time that international motor sports events were held on the "Solitude".
- 2003: 100-year celebration on a 4 km (2.5 mi) short route around the castle, but still using historical parts of the route from 1925 to 1935. Start and finish moved back to the castle. Racing direction clockwise. The only new part is the shortcut over the wildlife park expressway and its access ramp.
- since 2005: Glemseck 101 annual meeting for custom motorcycles
- 2011: As a result of the efforts of the Solitude-Revival and Retro Revival Classic Culture initiatives, the roads belonging to the latest variant were closed for a weekend as part of the 2011 automobile summer in Baden-Württemberg on the occasion of the 125th "birthday" of the Benz Patent-Motorwagen. Numerous visitors were able to watch historic racing and sports cars from different eras driving on the racetrack.

== Motorcycle racing ==
=== To 50 cm³ ===
- 1962: 1 Ernst Degner, Suzuki 2 Hans-Georg Anscheidt, Kreidler
- 1964: 1 Ralph Bryans, Honda 2 Isao Morishita, Suzuki
- 1965: 1 Ernst Degner, Suzuki 2 Hans-Georg Anscheidt, Kreidler

=== To 125 cc (175 cc) ===
- 1925: Willy Zig, Puch
- 1926 (175 cc): Arthur Müller, DKW
- 1927 (175 cc): Arthur Geiss, DKW
- 1949: L. Vienatzer, Puch
- 1950: Ewald Kluge, DKW
- 1951: Paul Hermann Müller, DKW
- 1952: Werner Haas, NSU
- 1953: Werner Haas, NSU
- 1954: Rupert Hollaus, NSU
- 1955: Karl Lottes, MV Agusta
- 1956: Romolo Ferri, Gilera
- 1962: Luigi Taveri, Honda
- 1964: Jim Redman, Honda
- 1965: Ernst Degner, Suzuki

=== To 250 cc ===
- 1922: F. Frommholz, NSU
- 1923: H. Schlaginweit, Paque
- 1925: Josef Stelzer, BMW
- 1926: Josef Stelzer, BMW
- 1927: K. Scherer, NSU
- 1928: Arthur Geiss, DKW
- 1929: Kurt Friedrich, DKW
- 1930: Otto Kohfink, Montgomery
- 1931: Arthur Geiss, DKW
- 1935: Arthur Geiss, DKW
- 1936: Arthur Geiss, DKW
- 1937: Ewald Kluge, DKW
- 1949: Otto Daiker, DKW
- 1950: Hein Thorn Prikker, Moto Guzzi
- 1951: Enrico Lorenzetti, Moto Guzzi
- 1952: Rudi rims Heier, DKW
- 1953: Otto Daiker, NSU
- 1954: Werner Haas, NSU
- 1955: Hans Baltisberger, NSU
- 1956: Carlo Ubbiali, MV Agusta
- 1959: Willy Oesterle, Maico
- 1960: Gary Hocking, MV Agusta
- 1961: Jim Redman, Honda
- 1962: Jim Redman, Honda
- 1964: Phil Read, Yamaha
- 1965: Ginger Molloy, Bultaco

=== To 350 cc ===
- 1925: E. Bussinger, A.J.S.
- 1926: Ms. Adam, A.J.S.
- 1927: F. Franconi, Motosacoche
- 1928: Friedrich Messerschmidt, BMW
- 1929: Hans Soénius, BMW
- 1930: Tom Bullus, NSU
- 1931: Jimmie Guthrie, Norton
- 1935: Werner Mellmann, NSU
- 1936: Heiner Fleischmann, NSU
- 1937: Heiner Fleischmann, NSU
- 1949: Wilhelm heart, NSU
- 1950: Heiner Fleischmann, NSU
- 1951: Norton Geoff Duke
- 1952: Reg Armstrong, Norton
- 1953: Siegfried wishes, DKW
- 1954: Ray Amm, Norton
- 1955: Ken Kavanagh, Moto Guzzi – 2 Course: August Hobl, DKW
- 1956: Bill Lomas Moto Guzzi – 2nd Place: August Hobl, DKW
- 1964: Jim Redman, Honda

=== 500 cc ===
- 1922: M. Mahlenbrei, Triumph
- 1923: J. Mayer, Victoria
- 1925: Rudolf Empire, BMW
- 1926: Ernst Jakob Henne, BMW
- 1927: Hans Thumshirn, Ardie
- 1927: Hans Soénius, BMW
- 1928: BMW Friedrich Messerschmidt
- 1929: Hans Soénius, BMW
- 1930: Tom Bullus, NSU
- 1931: Jimmie Guthrie, Norton
- 1935: Oscar Steinbach, NSU
- 1936: Otto Ley, BMW
- 1937: Kurt Mansfeld, DKW
- 1949: Georg Meier, BMW
- 1950: Heiner Fleischmann, NSU
- 1951: Norton Geoff Duke
- 1952: Reg Armstrong, Norton
- 1953: Georg Meier, BMW
- 1954: Geoff Duke, Gilera
- 1955: Walter Zeller, BMW
- 1956: Reg Armstrong, Gilera
- 1960: John Surtees, MV Agusta
- 1964: Mike Hailwood, MV Agusta (this year it was also World Champion)

=== To 750 cc ===
- 1925: V. King Fachsenfeld, Norton
- 1926: Charles Raebel, BMW

=== To 1000 cm ³ ===
- 1925: Ernst Ißlinger, NSU
- 1926: Paul Koppen, BMW
- 1927: BMW Toni Bauhofer
- 1928: Heck, Harley-Davidson
- 1929: Josef Stelzer, BMW
- 1930: Ernst Zündorf, BMW
- 1931: NSU Paul Rüttchen

=== 500/600/1000 cc sidecar ===
- 1925: 600 cc: Schwanberger, Norton – 1000 cc: Imholz Harley-Davidson
- 1927: 600 cc: H. Eurich, D-Rad – 1000 cc: H. Dobler, New Imperial
- 1928: 600 cc: Hermann Lang, Standard – 1000 cc: H. Frey, AJS
- 1929: 600 cc: Hermann Lang, Standard – 1000 cc: A. Sitzberger, BMW
- 1935: 600 cc: Hans Kahrmann, DKW – 1000 cc: Charles Brown / Ernst Badsching, Horex
- 1936: 600 cc: Toni Babl, DKW – 1000 cc: Hans Schumann, NSU
- 1937: 600 cc: Brown, DKW – 1000 cc: Zimmermann, DKW
- 1949: 600 cc: Schmidt / agent Meyer, NSU – 1000 cc: Max Klankermeier / Henry Wolz, BMW
- 1950: 600 cc: Hermann Boehm / Karl Fuchs, NSU – 1200 cc: Kraus / Huser, BMW
- 1951: 500 cc: Ludwig Kraus / Bernard Huser, BMW – 750 cc: Eric Oliver / Lorenzo Dobelli, Norton
- 1952: Cyril Smith / Bob Clements, Norton
- 1953: Eric Oliver / Stanley Dibben, Norton
- 1954: Wilhelm Noll / Fritz Cron, BMW
- 1955: Willi fist / Karl Remmert, BMW
- 1956: Wilhelm Noll / Fritz Cron, BMW
- 1960: Helmut Fath / Alfred borage, BMW
- 1961: Max Deubel / Emil horns, BMW
- 1962: Max Deubel / Emil horns, BMW
- 1964: Fritz Scheidegger / John Robinson, BMW
- 1965: Max Deubel / Emil horns, BMW

== Automobile races ==
Automobile races were held less frequently. From 1961 to 1964, these races on the Solitude racetrack, held in parallel to motorcycle racing, were not counting towards the Formula 1 World Cup. Participants or winners here were Hans Herrmann, Innes Ireland, Jim Clark, Dan Gurney, John Surtees, Jack Brabham.

=== Formula I and II ===
- 1960 (Formula II):
  - 1 Wolfgang Graf Berghe von Trips, Ferrari
  - 2 Hans Herrmann, Porsche
  - 3 Joakim Bonnier, Porsche
  - 4 Graham Hill, Porsche
  - 5 Dan Gurney, Porsche
- 1961 (Formula I):
  - 1 Innes Ireland, Lotus
  - 2 Joakim Bonnier, Porsche
  - 3 Dan Gurney, Porsche
  - 4 Bruce McLaren, Cooper
  - 5 Jack Brabham, Cooper
  - 6 Hans Herrmann, Porsche
  - 7 Jim Clark, Lotus
  - 8 Edgar Barth, Porsche
  - 9 Trevor Taylor, Lotus
- 1962 (Formula I):
  - 1 Dan Gurney, Porsche
  - 2 Joakim Bonnier, Porsche
  - 3 Trevor Taylor, Lotus
  - 4 Ian Burgess, Cooper
  - 5 Carel Godin de Beaufort, Porsche
  - 6 Gerhard Mitter, Lotus
  - 7 Heinz Schiller, Porsche
  - 8 Bernard Collomb, Cooper
- 1963 (Formula I):
  - 1 Jack Brabham, Brabham
  - 2 Peter Arundell, Lotus
  - 3 Innes Ireland, B.R.M.
  - 4 Lorenzo Bandini, B.R.M.
  - 5 Gerhard Mitter, Porsche
  - 6 Jim Hall, Lotus
  - 7 Carel Godin de Beaufort, Porsche
  - 8 Bob Anderson, Lola
  - 9 Joakim Bonnier, Cooper
  - 10 Mario Cabral, Cooper
- 1964 (Formula I):
  - 1 Jim Clark, Lotus
  - 2 John Surtees, Ferrari
  - 3 Bob Anderson, Brabham
  - 4 Peter Revson, B.R.M.
  - 5 Joakim Bonnier, Brabham
  - 6 Trevor Taylor, B.R.M.
  - 7 Jo Siffert, B.R.M.
  - 8 Carel Godin de Beaufort, Porsche
  - 9 Mike Hailwood, Lotus
  - 10 Ernst Maring, Kuhnke / Borgward
- 1965 (Formula II):
  - 1 Chris Amon, Lola
  - 2 Alan Rees, Brabham
  - 3 Gerhard Mitter, Brabham
  - 4 Peter Revson, Lotus
  - 5 Kurt Ahrens Jr.., Brabham
  - 6 Mike Beckwith, Brabham
  - 7 Jo Schlesser, Brabham
  - 8 Silvio Moser, Brabham
  - 9 Hans Herrmann, Lotus
  - 10 Eric Offenstadt, Cooper

== Lap records ==
The fastest official race lap records of the Solitude Racetrack are listed as:

Category	Time	Driver	Vehicle	Event
Grand Prix Circuit (1935–1965): 11.4086 km (7.089 mi)
Formula One	3:49.100	Jim Clark	Lotus 25	1963 Solitude Grand Prix
Sports car racing	3:59.200	Gerhard Mitter	Porsche 904/8 Bergspyder	1965 Solitude DARM round
Formula Two	4:01.500	Alan Rees	Brabham BT16	1965 Solitude Grand Prix
Formula Junior	4:04.700	Peter Arundell	Lotus 27	1963 Solitude Formula Junior race
350cc	4:15.900	Jim Redman	Honda RC172	1964 German motorcycle Grand Prix
500cc	4:16.300	Mike Hailwood	MV Agusta 500 4C	1964 German motorcycle Grand Prix
250cc	4:17.000	Phil Read	Yamaha RD56	1964 German motorcycle Grand Prix
125cc	4:37.600	Hugh Anderson	Suzuki 125 V4	1964 German motorcycle Grand Prix
Formula Libre	5:41.900	Hans Stuck	AFM-1	1949 Solituderennen
Original Grand Prix Circuit (1925–1930): 22.300 km (13.857 mi)
Formula Libre	13:23.300	Christian Werner	Mercedes 1924 GP	1926 Solituderennen
