= Gyula Marsovszky =

- Nationality: (Switzerland) Swiss
Motorcycle racing career statistics
Grand Prix motorcycle racing
Active years	1961–1975
First race	1961 500cc French Grand Prix
Last race	1975 Isle of Man 350cc Junior TT
First win	1971 250cc Nations Grand Prix
Last win	1971 250cc Nations Grand Prix
Team	Linto
Starts / Wins / Podiums / Poles / F. laps / Points; 58 / 1 / 8 / 0 / 0 / 228

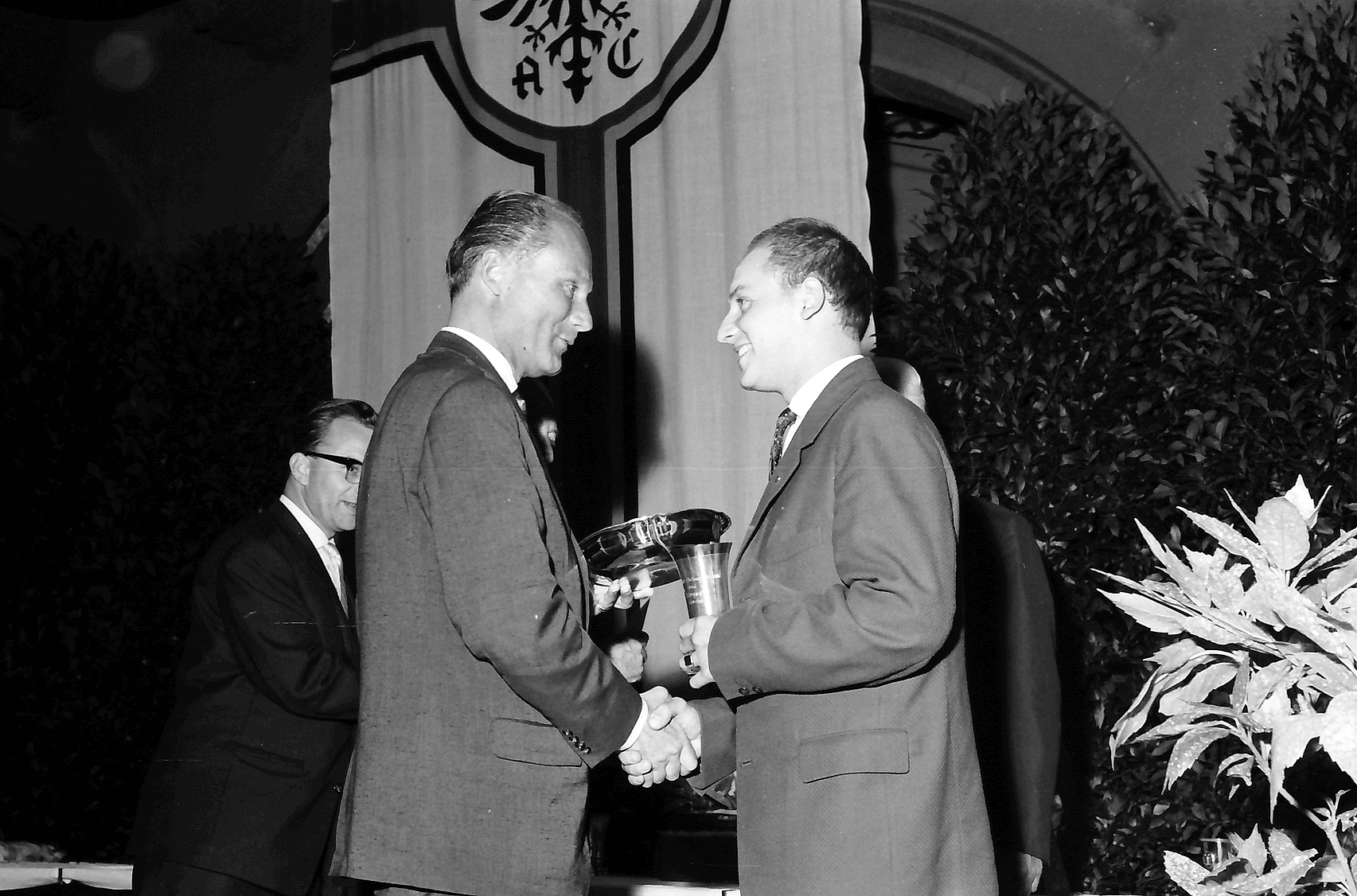
Gyula Marsovszky (right) 1963

Gyula Marsovszky (3 January 1936 – 17 December 2004) was a Swiss professional Grand Prix motorcycle road racer of Hungarian descent. His best years were the 1968 500cc world championship season, when he rode a Matchless motorcycle to third place behind Giacomo Agostini and Jack Findlay, then in 1969 when he finished second to Agostini, this time riding a Linto. In 1971, he won his first and only Grand Prix race when he triumphed at the 250cc Nations Grand Prix held at Monza.

== Grand Prix motorcycle racing results ==
Points system from 1950 to 1968:

**Position**	1	2	3	4	5	6
**Points**	8	6	4	3	2	1

Points system from 1969 onwards:

**Position**	1	2	3	4	5	6	7	8	9	10
**Points**	15	12	10	8	6	5	4	3	2	1

(key) (Races in bold indicate pole position; races in italics indicate fastest lap)

Year	Class	Team	1	2	3	4	5	6	7	8	9	10	11	12	13	Points	Rank	Wins
1961	500cc	Norton	GER -	FRA; 4	IOM; NC	NED -	BEL -	DDR -	ULS -	NAT -	SWE -	ARG -				3	15th	0
1962	350cc	Norton	IOM; NC	NED -		ULS -	DDR -	NAT -	FIN -							0	-	0
1962	500cc	Norton	IOM; 23	NED -	BEL -	ULS -	DDR -	NAT -	FIN -	ARG -						0	-	0
1963	350cc	Norton	GER -	IOM; NC	NED -	BEL -	ULS -	DDR -	FIN -	NAT -		JPN -				0	-	0
1963	500cc	Matchless		IOM; NC	NED -	BEL; 6	ULS -	DDR -	FIN -	NAT -	ARG -	JPN -				1	19th	0
1964	125cc	Bultaco	USA -	ESP -	FRA -	IOM; NC	NED -		GER -	DDR -	ULS -	FIN -	NAT -	JPN -		0	-	0
1964	350cc	Norton				IOM; 20	NED -		GER -	DDR -	ULS -	FIN -	NAT -	JPN -		0	-	0
1964	500cc	Matchless	USA -			IOM; NC	NED -	BEL -	GER; 4	DDR -	ULS -	FIN; 3	NAT -			7	7th	0
1965	250cc	Bultaco	USA -	GER -	ESP -	FRA -	IOM; NC	NED -	BEL -	DDR -	CZE -	ULS -	FIN -	NAT -	JPN -	0	-	0
1965	350cc	AJS		GER -			IOM; 24	NED -		DDR -	CZE -	ULS -	FIN -	NAT -	JPN -	0	-	0
1965	500cc	Matchless		GER -			IOM; 8	NED -	BEL; 6	DDR -	CZE -	ULS -	FIN -	NAT; 6	JPN -	2	20th	0
1966	250cc	Bultaco	ESP -	GER -	FRA -	NED -	BEL -	DDR -	CZE; 5	FIN -	ULS; 2	IOM -	NAT -	JPN -		8	12th	0
1966	500cc	Matchless		GER; 3		NED -	BEL; 4	DDR; 5	CZE; 3	FIN -	ULS -	IOM -	NAT -			13	6th	0
1967	250cc	Bultaco	ESP -	GER; 5	FRA -	IOM; 7	NED -	BEL; 6	DDR; 6	CZE -	FIN; 4	ULS; 6	NAT -	CAN -	JPN -	8	8th	0
1967	500cc	Matchless		GER -		IOM; 14	NED; 5	BEL; 5	DDR -	CZE; 4	FIN -	ULS -	NAT -	CAN -		7	8th	0
1968	250cc	Bultaco	GER -	ESP -	IOM; NC	NED -	BEL -	DDR -	CZE -	FIN; 6	ULS -	NAT -				1	16th	0
1968	500cc	Matchless	GER; 4	ESP; 5	IOM; NC	NED -	BEL -	DDR -	CZE; 3	FIN; 6	ULS -	NAT -				10	3rd	0
1969	250cc	Yamaha	ESP -	GER -	FRA -	IOM -	NED -	BEL; 10	DDR -	CZE -	FIN -	ULS -	NAT -	YUG; 10		2	49th	0
1969	500cc	Linto	ESP; 4	GER; 6	FRA; 6	IOM -	NED; 6	BEL; 4	DDR -	CZE; 2	FIN -	ULS -	NAT; 7	YUG -		47	2nd	0
1970	250cc	Yamaha	GER; 8	FRA; 7	YUG; 9	IOM -	NED -	BEL -	DDR; 6	CZE -	FIN -	ULS -	NAT; 5	ESP; 4		28	7th	0
1970	500cc	Kawasaki	GER -	FRA; 6	YUG; 8	IOM -	NED; 9	BEL -	DDR -	CZE -	FIN -	ULS -	NAT; 4	ESP -		18	13th	0
1971	250cc	Yamaha	AUT; 3	GER; 4	IOM; 6	NED; 6	BEL; 7	DDR; 4	CZE -	SWE -	FIN; 5	ULS; 7	NAT; 1	ESP -		57	6th	1
1972	250cc	Yamaha	GER -	FRA -	AUT -	NAT -	IOM; 13	YUG -	NED -	BEL -	DDR -	CZE -	SWE -	FIN -	ESP -	0	-	0
1973	350cc	Yamaha	FRA -	AUT; 8	GER; 5	NAT; 10	IOM; 11	YUG -	NED -		CZE -	SWE -	FIN -	ESP; 9		12	18th	0
1973	500cc	Yamaha	FRA -	AUT -	GER -		IOM -	YUG; 7	NED -	BEL -	CZE -	SWE -	FIN -	ESP -		4	34th	0
1974	250cc	Yamaha	GER -	NAT -	IOM; 18	NED -	BEL -	SWE -	FIN -	CZE -	YUG -	ESP -				0	-	0
1975	250cc	Yamaha	FRA -	ESP -		GER -	NAT -	IOM; 24	NED -	BEL -	SWE -	FIN -	CZE -	YUG -		0	-	0
1975	350cc	Yamaha	FRA -	ESP -	AUT -	GER -	NAT -	IOM; NC	NED -	BEL -	SWE -	FIN -	CZE -	YUG -		0	-	0
