= Motohashi =

Motohashi (written: 本橋) is a Japanese surname. Notable people with the surname include:

- Akihito Motohashi (本橋 昭人), Japanese Paralympic athlete
- Akiyasu Motohashi, Japanese motorcycle racer
- Hideyuki Motohashi, Japanese animator
- Mari Motohashi (本橋 麻里, born 1986), Japanese curler
- Nako Motohashi (本橋 菜子, born 1993), Japanese women's basketball player
- Seiichi Motohashi (本橋 成一, born 1940), Japanese photographer
- Takumi Motohashi (本橋 卓巳, born 1982), Japanese footballer
- Yuka Motohashi (本橋 由香, born 1978), Japanese actress
