= Ron Chandler =

British motorcycle racer

- Nationality: British
Motorcycle racing career statistics
Grand Prix motorcycle racing
Active years	1966, 1968 - 1971
First race	1966 500cc Belgian Grand Prix
Last race	1971 500cc Ulster Grand Prix
Starts / Wins / Podiums / Poles / F. laps / Points; 16 / 0 / 1 / N/A / N/A / 62

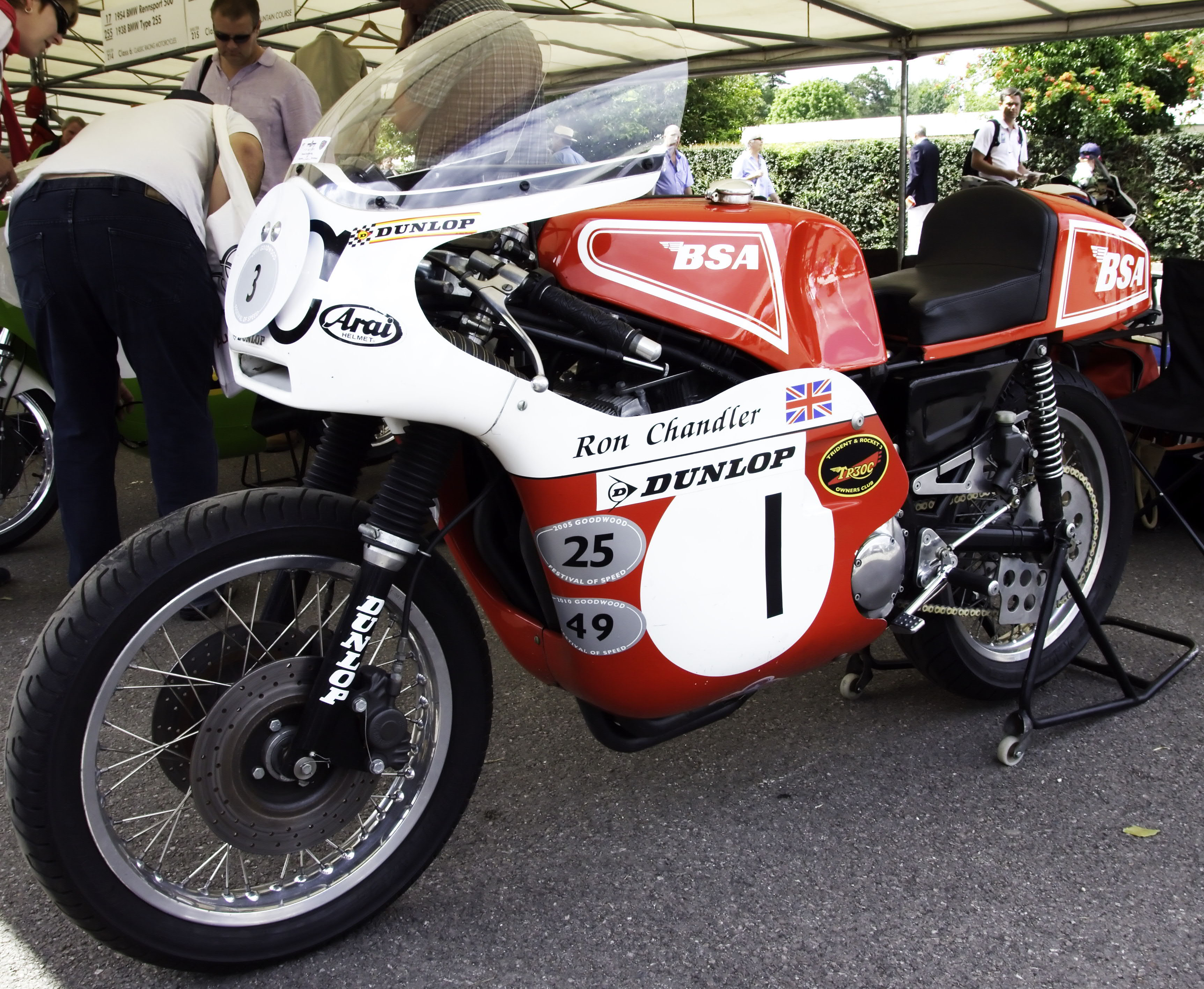
BSA Rocket 3 750 cc racer as campaigned by Chandler in the early 1970s

Ron Chandler was a British professional motorcycle racer. He competed in selected Grand Prix motorcycle road racing events between 1966 and 1971.

A Thames Lighterman by trade, Chandler was sponsored during his early career from 1962 by entrant Tom Kirby a motorcycle dealer with premises at Roneo Corner, Hornchurch, Essex. Breaking his ties to Tom Kirby in 1964, Chandler was then sponsored by Reg Kirby, Tom's brother and a motorcycle dealer from Stanford-le-Hope, Essex, whose bikes were prepared by Colin Seeley's race shop, Colin Seeley Racing Developments.

Chandler's best result at the Isle of Man TT was a fifth place finish in the 1966 Senior TT riding a Matchless motorcycle. In 1967, he won the prestigious 'King of Brands' title race. His best Grand Prix season was in 1969, when he finished in seventh place in the 500cc world championship. His best individual result in the world championships was a podium finish at the 1971 500cc West German Grand Prix when, he rode a Kawasaki H1R to a third place finish behind the reigning world champion Giacomo Agostini and Rob Bron at the Hockenheimring circuit.
