= Jack Ahearn =

Australian motorcycle racer

- Nationality: Australian
Motorcycle racing career statistics
Grand Prix motorcycle racing
Active years	1954 – 1955, 1958, 1962 – 1966, 1974
First race	1954 350cc Isle of Man TT
Last race	1974 Isle of Man 350cc Junior TT
First win	1964 500cc Finnish Grand Prix
Last win	1964 500cc Finnish Grand Prix
Championships	0
Starts / Wins / Podiums / Poles / F. laps / Points; 24 / 1 / 8 / N/A / N/A / 66
Isle of Man TT career
TTs contested	5 (1955, 1963 – 1966)
TT wins	0
TT podiums	0

Jack Jerome Ahearn (8 October 1924 – 10 April 2017) was an Australian Grand Prix motorcycle road racer. His best season was in 1964 when he won the 500cc Finnish Grand Prix and finished second to Mike Hailwood in the 500cc world championship. On 16 January 2001, Ahearn was awarded the Australian Sports Medal for his achievements. Ahearn died on 10 April 2017 in Ballina.

== Motorcycle Grand Prix results ==
**Position**	1	2	3	4	5	6
**Points**	8	6	4	3	2	1

(key) (Races in bold indicate pole position; races in italics indicate fastest lap)

Year	Class	Team	1	2	3	4	5	6	7	8	9	10	11	12	Points	Rank	Wins
1954	350cc	Norton	FRA -	IOM; NC	ULS -	BEL -	NED -	GER -	SUI -	NAT -	ESP -				0	-	0
1954	500cc	Norton	FRA -	IOM; 9	ULS -	BEL -	NED -	GER -	SUI -	NAT -	ESP -				0	-	0
1955	350cc	Norton		FRA -	IOM; 10	GER; 10	BEL; 9	NED -	ULS -	NAT -					0	-	0
1955	500cc	Norton	ESP -	FRA -	IOM; NC	GER; 6	BEL; 7	NED -	ULS -	NAT -					1	26th	0
1958	350cc	AJS	IOM; 17	NED -	BEL -	GER -	SWE -	ULS -	NAT -						0	-	0
1958	500cc	Matchless	IOM; 29	NED -	BEL -	GER -	SWE -	ULS -	NAT -						0	-	0
1962	350cc	Norton	IOM; 12	NED -		ULS -	DDR -	NAT -	FIN -						0	-	0
1962	500cc	Norton	IOM; NC	NED -	BEL -	ULS -	DDR -	NAT -	FIN -	ARG -					0	-	0
1963	125cc	Ducati	ESP -	GER -	FRA -	IOM; 21	NED -	BEL -	ULS -	DDR -	FIN -	NAT -	ARG -	JPN -	0	-	0
1963	350cc	Norton		GER -		IOM; 5	NED; 5	BEL -	ULS -	DDR -	FIN -	NAT -		JPN -	4	11th	0
1963	500cc	Norton				IOM; 9	NED; 4	BEL; 5	ULS -	DDR -	FIN -	NAT -	ARG -		5	10th	1
1964	125cc	Honda	USA -	ESP -	FRA; 8	IOM -	NED -		GER -	DDR -	ULS -	FIN -	NAT -	JPN -	0	-	0
1964	250cc	Suzuki	USA -	ESP -	FRA -	IOM; NC	NED -	BEL -	GER -	DDR -	ULS -		NAT -	JPN -	0	-	0
1964	350cc	Norton				IOM; NC	NED -		GER -	DDR -	ULS -	FIN -	NAT; 6	JPN -	1	22nd	0
1964	500cc	Norton	USA -			IOM; 14	NED; 4	BEL; 4	GER; 2	DDR; 6	ULS; 3	FIN; 1	NAT; 3	JPN -	25	2nd	1
1965	500cc	Norton	GER -	IOM; 9	NED; 5	BEL -	DDR; 4	CZE; 3	ULS -	FIN -	NAT -	JPN -			9	5th	0
1966	350cc	Norton	GER -	FRA -	NED -		DDR; 6	CZE -	FIN; 3	ULS -	IOM; 4	NAT -	JPN -		8	8th	0
1966	500cc	Norton	GER -		NED -	BEL; 3	DDR; 3	CZE; 5	FIN; 4	ULS -	IOM; NC	NAT -			13	6th	0
1974	350cc	Yamaha	FRA -	GER -	AUT -	NAT -	IOM; 34	NED -	SWE -	FIN -	YUG -	ESP -			0	-	0
