= Max Deubel =

German sidecar racer

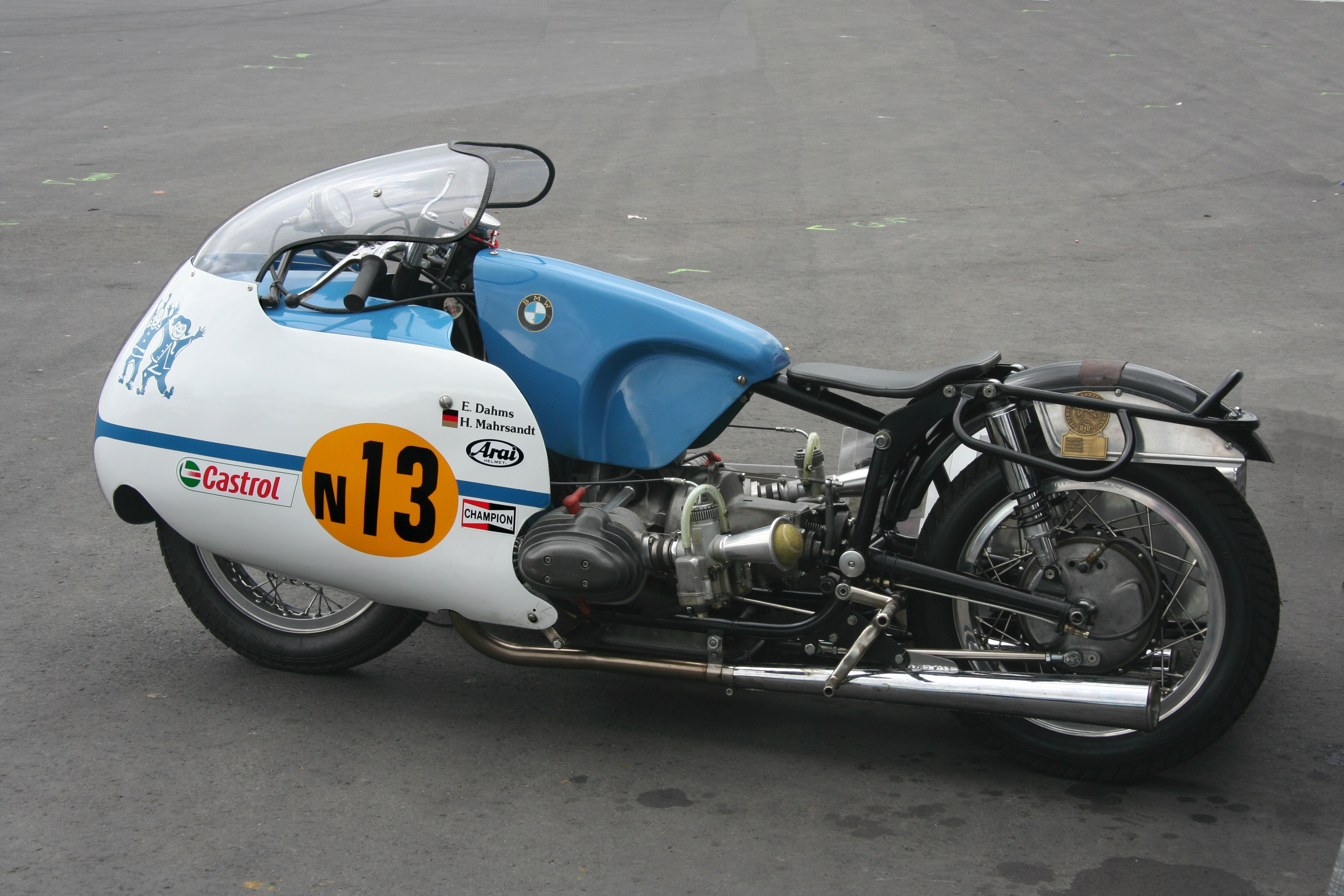
- Nationality: German
Motorcycle racing career statistics
Grand Prix motorcycle racing
Active years	1960 – 1966
First race	1960 Isle of Man Sidecar TT
Last race	1966 Belgian Sidecar Grand Prix
First win	1961 West German Sidecar Grand Prix
Last win	1965 Isle of Man Sidecar TT
Team	BMW
Championships	4
Starts / Wins / Podiums / Poles / F. laps / Points; / 12 / / N/A / N/A
Isle of Man TT career
TTs contested	7 (1960 - 1966)
TT wins	3
First TT win	1961 Sidecar TT
Last TT win	1965 Sidecar TT
TT podiums	4

Max Deubel (born 5 February 1935 in Wiehl, Germany) is a German former professional sidecar racer. He was four time FIM Sidecar World Champion and a three-time Isle of Man Sidecar TT winner.

In 1962, Deubel and passenger Emil Hörner were the first sidecar team to lap the Isle of Man TT course at over 90 miles (140 km) per hour. Deubel and Hörner were awarded the 1966 Sidecar World Championship after Fritz Scheidegger and John Robinson were excluded for a fuel irregularity at the Isle of Man TT, but on appeal Scheidegger and Robinson were reinstated three months later. Deubel retired after the 1966 season and has remained involved in motorsport as an FIM official. In 2015, Deubel was named an FIM Legend for his motorcycle racing achievements.

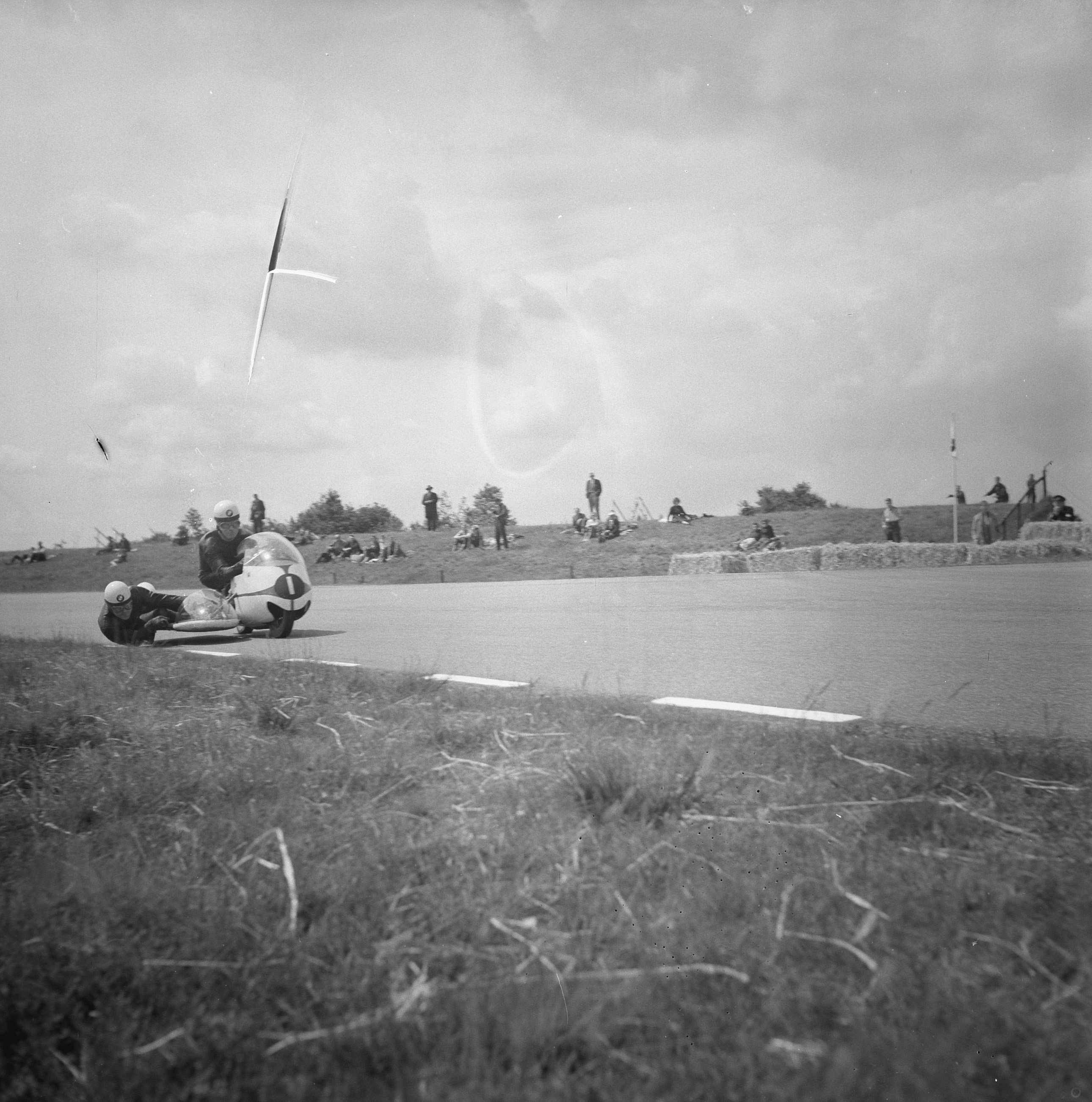
Deubel and Emil Hoerner during the 1963 Sidecar Dutch TT.

Sporting positions
Preceded by Helmut Fath with Alfred Wohlgemuth	World Sidecar Champion with Emil Hörner; 1961-1964	Succeeded by Fritz Scheidegger with John Robinson
