= 1966 Grand Prix motorcycle racing season =

Sports season

1966 F.I.M. Grand Prix motorcycle racing season

Seasons
- ← 1965 1967 →

The 1966 Grand Prix motorcycle racing season was the 18th F.I.M. Road Racing World Championship Grand Prix season. The season consisted of twelve Grand Prix races in six classes: 500cc, 350cc, 250cc, 125cc, 50cc and Sidecars 500cc. It began on 8 May, with Spanish Grand Prix and ended with Japanese Grand Prix on 17 October.

== Season summary ==
Honda stepped up their racing program with a new four-cylinder 500cc bike, as well as bikes in the four smaller classes. Despite Honda's increased efforts, Suzuki would claim the 50cc title with Hans-Georg Anscheidt winning the championship from Honda's Luigi Taveri at the last race of the season in Japan. Yamaha would battle Honda all season for the 125 crown, each factory taking five wins, with Honda's Taveri taking the title from Yamaha's Bill Ivy.

Mike Hailwood, having left the MV Agusta team to ride for Honda, stormed to the 250 crown, winning the first eight races of the season, as Phil Read struggled with Yamaha's new v-four race bike. Hailwood would make it a double when he also claimed the 350 class ahead of MV Agusta's Giacomo Agostini. Honda's plan was for Jim Redman to lead their 500 class campaign before he retired. All started well with Redman winning the first two races of the year however, Honda's hopes were dashed when he crashed in the rain in Belgium and broke his wrist. This gave Agostini the championship lead, which he held despite Hailwood taking three of the last six races. Honda took some consolation by winning all five constructor's titles for a clean sweep.

== 1966 Grand Prix season calendar ==
Round	Date	Grand Prix	Circuit	50cc winner	125cc winner	250cc winner	350cc winner	500cc winner	Sidecars 500cc winner	Report
1	8 May	(Spain) Spanish Grand Prix	Montjuïc circuit	(Switzerland) Luigi Taveri	(United Kingdom) Bill Ivy	(United Kingdom) Mike Hailwood				Report
2	22 May	(West Germany) West German Grand Prix	Hockenheimring	(West Germany) Hans-Georg Anscheidt	(Switzerland) Luigi Taveri	(United Kingdom) Mike Hailwood	(United Kingdom) Mike Hailwood	(Rhodesia) Jim Redman	(Switzerland) (United Kingdom) Scheidegger / Robinson	Report
3	29 May	(France) French Grand Prix	Charade Circuit			(United Kingdom) Mike Hailwood	(United Kingdom) Mike Hailwood		(Switzerland) (United Kingdom) Scheidegger / Robinson	Report
4	25 June	(Netherlands) Dutch TT	TT Circuit Assen	(Switzerland) Luigi Taveri	(United Kingdom) Bill Ivy	(United Kingdom) Mike Hailwood	(United Kingdom) Mike Hailwood	(Rhodesia) Jim Redman	(Switzerland) (United Kingdom) Scheidegger / Robinson	Report
5	3 July	(Belgium) Belgian Grand Prix	Spa-Francorchamps			(United Kingdom) Mike Hailwood		(Italy) Giacomo Agostini	(Switzerland) (United Kingdom) Scheidegger / Robinson	Report
6	17 July	(East Germany) East German Grand Prix	Sachsenring		(Switzerland) Luigi Taveri	(United Kingdom) Mike Hailwood	(Italy) Giacomo Agostini	(Czechoslovakia) František Šťastný		Report
7	24 July	(Czechoslovakia) Czechoslovak Grand Prix	Masaryk Circuit		(Switzerland) Luigi Taveri	(United Kingdom) Mike Hailwood	(United Kingdom) Mike Hailwood	(United Kingdom) Mike Hailwood		Report
8	7 August	(Finland) Finnish Grand Prix	Imatra Circuit		(United Kingdom) Phil Read	(United Kingdom) Mike Hailwood	(United Kingdom) Mike Hailwood	(Italy) Giacomo Agostini		Report
9	20 August	(Northern Ireland) Ulster Grand Prix	Dundrod Circuit		(Switzerland) Luigi Taveri	(New Zealand) Ginger Molloy	(United Kingdom) Mike Hailwood	(United Kingdom) Mike Hailwood		Report
10	2 September	Isle of Man TT	Snaefell Mountain	(Northern Ireland) Ralph Bryans	(United Kingdom) Bill Ivy	(United Kingdom) Mike Hailwood	(Italy) Giacomo Agostini	(United Kingdom) Mike Hailwood	(Switzerland) (United Kingdom) Scheidegger / Robinson	Report
11	11 September	(Italy) Nations Grand Prix	Monza	(West Germany) Hans-Georg Anscheidt	(Switzerland) Luigi Taveri	(United Kingdom) Mike Hailwood	(Italy) Giacomo Agostini	(Italy) Giacomo Agostini		Report
12	17 October	(Japan) Japanese Grand Prix	Fuji Speedway	(Japan) Yoshimi Katayama	(United Kingdom) Bill Ivy	(Japan) Hiroshi Hasegawa	(United Kingdom) Phil Read			Report

== Standings ==
=== Scoring system ===
Points were awarded to the top six finishers in each race. Only the best of four were counted on 50cc championships, best of five in 350cc and 500cc championships, best of six in 125cc and 250cc championships, while in the Sidecars, only the best of three races were counted.

Position	1st	2nd	3rd	4th	5th	6th
Points	8	6	4	3	2	1

==== 500cc final standings ====
Pos	Rider	Machine	GER (Germany)	HOL (Netherlands)	BEL (Belgium)	DDR (East Germany)	TCH (Czechoslovakia)	FIN (Finland)	ULS (Northern Ireland)	MAN (Isle of Man)	NAC (Italy)	Pts
1	(Italy) Giacomo Agostini	MV Agusta	2	2	1	Ret	2	1	2	2	1	**36** (54)
2	(United Kingdom) Mike Hailwood	Honda	Ret	Ret	Ret	Ret	1	2	1	1	Ret	**30**
3	(Australia) Jack Findlay	Matchless	11	6	Ret	2	4	3	4	8	3	**20** (21)
4	(Czechoslovakia) František Šťastný	Jawa-CZ		3	Ret	1	Ret	Ret	3	6	Ret	**17**
5	(Rhodesia) Jim Redman	Honda	1	1	Ret							**16**
6	(Switzerland) Gyula Marsovszky	Matchless	3	7	4	5	3	7	8		8	**13**
7	(Australia) Jack Ahearn	Norton	8	9	3	3	5	4		Ret		**13**
8	(United Kingdom) Stuart Graham	Matchless	4	5	2	Ret	Ret	Ret				**11**
9	(United Kingdom) Peter Williams	Matchless / AJS			9				6	7	2	**7**
10	(United Kingdom) Chris Conn	Norton	Ret	Ret	Ret			Ret	5	3	Ret	**6**
11	(United Kingdom) Ron Chandler	Matchless		Ret	6	4				5	Ret	**6**
12	(United Kingdom) John Cooper	Norton	Ret	4	Ret		7		Ret		Ret	**3**
13	(United Kingdom) Fred Stevens	Paton / Matchless / Metisse	Ret	8	14	Ret	Ret	8	12	12	4	**3**
14	(United Kingdom) John Blanchard	Seeley / Matchless							Ret	4		**3**
15	(United Kingdom) Lewis Young	Matchless	5	Ret	8	Ret	9	6			Ret	**3**
16	(Australia) Malcolm Stanton	Norton		14	Ret	Ret		5		10	Ret	**2**
17	(Germany) Walter Scheimann	Norton	10	Ret	Ret		14				5	**2**
18	(United Kingdom) John Mawby	Norton			5	Ret					13	**2**
19	(Austria) Edy Lenz	Matchless	6		Ret	Ret	Ret			Ret	6	**2**
20	(Australia) John Dodds	Norton	Ret		13	6	10		Ret	Ret	Ret	**1**
21	(Australia) Eric Hinton	Norton				Ret	6	Ret				**1**
22	(United Kingdom) Dan Shorey	Norton	7	12	11	8	13		Ret	19	Ret	**0**
23	(Sweden) Bo Granath	Matchless			7	Ret	12	9				**0**
24	(United Kingdom) Derek Lee	Matchless					Ret	Ret	17	Ret	7	**0**
25	(United Kingdom) Joe Dunphy	Norton		Ret		7	Ret		Ret	Ret		**0**
26	(Wales) Selwyn Griffiths	Matchless							7	Ret		**0**
27	(United Kingdom) Billie Nelson	Norton	9	Ret		9	8	12		Ret		**0**
28	(Northern Ireland) Billy McCosh	Matchless							10	9		**0**
29	(Czechoslovakia) Gustav Havel	Jawa-CZ	Ret	11		14	11	Ret	9		Ret	**0**
30	(France) Philippe Canoui	Matchless			Ret	Ret					9	**0**
31	(Sweden) Agne Carlsson	Matchless				10	Ret	10				**0**
32	(Australia) Kel Carruthers	Norton	Ret	10	Ret	Ret		Ret	13	11	Ret	**0**
33	(Australia) Len Atlee	Norton	Ret		10	Ret			15	21		**0**
34	(Sweden) Billy Andersson	Matchless						11		16		**0**
35	(Hungary) György Kurucz	Norton				11	Ret					**0**
36	(Italy) Giuseppe Dardanello	Norton									11	**0**
=	(United Kingdom) Robin Fitton	Norton							11			**0**
38	(United Kingdom) Maurice Hawthorne	Norton			12					18	10	**0**
39	(Canada) David Lloyd	Norton			Ret	12				20		**0**
40	(Italy) Vasco Loro	Norton									12	**0**
41	(Finland) Pentti Lehtelä	Norton				Ret	15	13				**0**
42	(Australia) Jack Saunders	Matchless				13			20	Ret		**0**
43	(Germany) Karl Hoppe	Matchless	Ret	13							Ret	**0**
44	(United Kingdom) George Fogarty	Matchless								13		**0**
45	(United Kingdom) Roly Capner	Matchless								14		**0**
=	(United Kingdom) Barry Scully	Norton							14			**0**
47	(United Kingdom) Godfrey Nash	Norton		15								**0**
=	(United Kingdom) Charlie Sanby	Norton								15		**0**
49	(Austria) Rudi Thalhammer	Seeley / Norton / Matchless	Ret	16			Ret				Ret	**0**
=	(Switzerland) Ernst Weiss	Matchless				Ret	Ret		16	Ret		**0**
51	(United Kingdom) Peter Sheppard	Norton					16					**0**
52	(Canada) Roger Beaumont	Norton	Ret	Ret	Ret		17			Ret		**0**
53	(New Zealand) Neville Landrebe	Matchless								17		**0**
54	(United Kingdom) Dennis Gallagher	Matchless							18	Ret		**0**
55	(Australia) Tom Gill	Matchless							19	Ret		**0**
56	(New Zealand) Ray Breingan	Norton							21	Ret		**0**
57	(Canada) Stuart Morin	Norton				Ret		Ret		22		**0**
58	(Northern Ireland) Terence Taylor	Norton							22			**0**
59	(Northern Ireland) Brian Taggart	Norton							23			**0**
=	(United Kingdom) Carl Ward	Norton								23		**0**
61	(United States) Byron Black	Matchless							24	28		**0**
62	(United Kingdom) Dave Williams	Norton								24		**0**
63	(United Kingdom) Steve Jolly	Norton								25		**0**
64	(United Kingdom) Peter Darvill	Matchless								26		**0**
65	(United Kingdom) Dave Duncan	Matchless								27		**0**
66	(United Kingdom) Les Kempster	Norton								29		**0**
67	(United Kingdom) Jim Ashton	Matchless								30		**0**
68	(United Kingdom) Laurence Povey	Norton								31		**0**
69	(United Kingdom) Harry Reynolds	Matchless								32		**0**
-	(South Africa) Ian Burne	Norton	Ret		Ret	Ret				Ret		**0**
-	(United Kingdom) Griff Jenkins	Norton / Dunstall					Ret		Ret	Ret		**0**
-	(United Kingdom) John Denty	Norton							Ret	Ret		**0**
-	(Rhodesia) Owen Howard	Matchless							Ret	Ret		**0**
-	(United Kingdom) Derek Minter	Seeley / Matchless	Ret	Ret								**0**
-	(New Zealand) Johnny Wales	Norton		Ret	Ret							**0**
-	(Republic of Ireland) Stan Adams	Norton								Ret		**0**
-	(Germany) Hartmut Allner	BMW	Ret									**0**
-	(Sweden) Kent Andersson	Husqvarna						Ret				**0**
-	(France) Alain Barbaroux	Norton			Ret							**0**
-	(United Kingdom) Roy Bisbey	Norton								Ret		**0**
-	(United Kingdom) David Brown	Norton		Ret								**0**
-	(United Kingdom) Rex Butcher	Norton								Ret		**0**
-	(Germany) Hans-Otto Butenuth	BMW	Ret									**0**
-	(United Kingdom) Kel Carlsson	Norton								Ret		**0**
-	(United Kingdom) Conway Chivers	Norton								Ret		**0**
-	(Belgium) Guy Cooremans	Norton				Ret						**0**
-	(Northern Ireland) Davy Crawford	Norton							Ret			**0**
-	(United Kingdom) Dave Croxford	Matchless							Ret			**0**
-	(United Kingdom) Brian Dennis	Velocette								Ret		**0**
-	(Italy) Gianfranco Domeniconi	Norton									Ret	**0**
-	(United Kingdom) Vincent Duckett	Matchless								Ret		**0**
-	(Canada) Mike Duff	Matchless								Ret		**0**
-	(Germany) Fritjof Eccarius	Matchless	Ret									**0**
-	(United Kingdom) Steve Ellis	Matchless								Ret		**0**
-	(South Africa) Ray Flack	Norton								Ret		**0**
-	(Japan) Toshio Fujii	Norton			Ret							**0**
-	(Northern Ireland) Robert Graham	AJS							Ret			**0**
-	(Northern Ireland) Billie Guthrie	Norton							Ret			**0**
-	(United Kingdom) Albert Haddock	Triumph								Ret		**0**
-	(United Kingdom) Trevor Holdsworth	Norton								Ret		**0**
-	(United Kingdom) Alan Hunter	Norton								Ret		**0**
-	(Australia) David Johnson	Norton							Ret			**0**
-	(United Kingdom) David Jones	BSA								Ret		**0**
-	(Northern Ireland) Jimmy Jones	Norton							Ret			**0**
-	(United Kingdom) Ken Kay	Matchless								Ret		**0**
-	(United Kingdom) Reay Mackay	Vincent HRD								Ret		**0**
-	(United Kingdom) Tony McGurk	Matchless								Ret		**0**
-	(United Kingdom) Michael McStay	Norton								Ret		**0**
-	(Germany) Helmut Morgenstern	Norton	Ret									**0**
-	(United Kingdom) Albert Moule	Norton								Ret		**0**
-	(United Kingdom) Frank Mumford	Norton								Ret		**0**
-	(Finland) Tauno Nurmi	Norton					Ret					**0**
-	(Netherlands) Bert Oosterhuis	Norton		Ret								**0**
-	(Italy) Giovanni Perrone	Bianchi									Ret	**0**
-	(United Kingdom) Alan Prange	Matchless								Ret		**0**
-	(United Kingdom) Norman Price	Norton								Ret		**0**
-	(United Kingdom) Tom Read	Norton								Ret		**0**
-	(Northern Ireland) Robert Reid	Norton							Ret			**0**
-	(Finland) Jouko Ryhänen	Matchless						Ret				**0**
-	(United Kingdom) Tony Rutter	Norton								Ret		**0**
-	(United Kingdom) Alf Shaw	Norton								Ret		**0**
-	(United Kingdom) John Simmonds	Norton								Ret		**0**
-	(Norway) Lars Skjelfoss	Matchless				Ret						**0**
-	(United Kingdom) Bill Smith	Matchless								Ret		**0**
-	(South Africa) Hans Sommerhalder	Matchless								Ret		**0**
-	(United Kingdom) Adrian Spooner	Norton								Ret		**0**
-	(Wales) Malcolm Uphill	Norton								Ret		**0**
-	(United Kingdom) Brian Walmsley	Norton								Ret		**0**
-	(Australia) Ron Wilson	Norton							Ret			**0**
-	(Northern Ireland) Tony Wood	Norton							Ret			**0**
-	(United Kingdom) Derek Woodman	Matchless			Ret							**0**
-	(Italy) Benedetto Zambotti	Norton									Ret	**0**
Pos	Rider	Bike	GER (Germany)	HOL (Netherlands)	BEL (Belgium)	DDR (East Germany)	TCH (Czechoslovakia)	FIN (Finland)	ULS (Ulster)	MAN (United Kingdom)	NAC (Italy)	Pts

Colour	Result
Gold	Winner
Silver	Second place
Bronze	Third place
Green	Points classification
Blue	Non-points classification
Blue	Non-classified finish (NC)
Purple	Retired, not classified (Ret)
Red	Did not qualify (DNQ)
Red	Did not pre-qualify (DNPQ)
Black	Disqualified (DSQ)
White	Did not start (DNS)
White	Withdrew (WD)
White	Race cancelled (C)
Blank	Did not practice (DNP)
Blank	Did not arrive (DNA)
Blank	Excluded (EX)

**Bold** – Pole
Italics – Fastest Lap

=== 350cc Standings ===
Place	Rider	Number	Country	Machine	Points	Wins
1	(United Kingdom) Mike Hailwood		United Kingdom	Honda	48	6
2	(Italy) Giacomo Agostini		Italy	MV Agusta	42	3
3	(Italy) Renzo Pasolini		Italy	Aermacchi	17	0
4	(Czechoslovakia) František Šťastný		Czechoslovakia	Jawa	13	0
5	(Czechoslovakia) Gustav Havel		Czechoslovakia	Jawa	12	0
6	(Italy) Alberto Pagani		Italy	Aermacchi	11	0
7	(East Germany) Heinz Rosner		East Germany	MZ	10	0
8	(United Kingdom) Phil Read		United Kingdom	Yamaha	8	1
9	(Australia) Jack Ahearn		Australia	Norton	8	0
10	(Rhodesia) Bruce Beale		Rhodesia	Honda	7	0
11	(Italy) Tarquinio Provini		Italy	Benelli	6	0
=	(United Kingdom) Peter Williams		United Kingdom	AJS	6	0
=	(United Kingdom) Bill Ivy		United Kingdom	Yamaha	6	0
14	(Italy) Silvio Grassetti		Italy	Bianchi	6	0
15	(Rhodesia) Jim Redman		Rhodesia	Honda	4	0
=	(United Kingdom) Tommy Robb		United Kingdom	Bultaco	4	0
=	(United Kingdom) Chris Conn		United Kingdom	Norton	4	0
18	(Italy) Gilberto Milani		Italy	Aermacchi	3	0
=	(United Kingdom) Stuart Graham		United Kingdom	AJS	3	0
=	(Australia) Kel Carruthers		Australia	Norton	3	0
=	(United Kingdom) Byron Black		United Kingdom	Honda	3	0
22	(Czechoslovakia) František Boček		Czechoslovakia	Jawa	3	0
23	(United Kingdom) Dave Simmonds		United Kingdom	Honda-Norton	2	0
=	(Japan) Kenzo Muromachi		Japan	Honda	2	0
25	(United Kingdom) John Blanchard		United Kingdom	AJS	1	0
=	(United Kingdom) Joe Dunphy		United Kingdom	Norton	1	0
=	(Sweden) Kent Andersson		Sweden	Husqvarna	1	0

=== 250cc Standings ===
Place	Rider	Number	Country	Machine	Points	Wins
1	(United Kingdom) Mike Hailwood		United Kingdom	Honda	56	10
2	(United Kingdom) Phil Read		United Kingdom	Yamaha	34	0
3	(Rhodesia) Jim Redman		Rhodesia	Honda	20	0
4	(United Kingdom) Derek Woodman		United Kingdom	MZ	18	0
5	(United Kingdom) Stuart Graham		United Kingdom	Honda	15	0
6	(East Germany) Heinz Rosner		East Germany	MZ	15	0
7	(Australia) Jack Findlay		Australia	Bultaco	14	0
8	(Czechoslovakia) František Šťastný		Czechoslovakia	Jawa	11	0
9	(Canada) Michelle Duff		Canada	Yamaha	9	0
10	(New Zealand) Ginger Molloy		New Zealand	Bultaco	8	1
=	(Japan) Hiroshi Hasegawa		Japan	Yamaha	8	1
12	(Switzerland) Gyula Marsovsky		Switzerland	Bultaco	8	0
13	(United Kingdom) Bill Ivy		United Kingdom	Yamaha	5	0
14	(Italy) Renzo Pasolini		Italy	Aermacchi	4	0
=	(Australia) Kevin Cass		Australia	Bultaco	4	0
=	(United Kingdom) Peter Inchley		United Kingdom	Villiers	4	0
=	(Italy) Alberto Pagani		Italy	Aermacchi	4	0
=	(Japan) Akiyasu Motohashi		Japan	Yamaha	4	0
19	(Rhodesia) Bruce Beale		Rhodesia	Honda	4	0
20	(Sweden) Kent Andersson		Sweden	Husqvarna	4	0
21	(United Kingdom) Selwyn Griffiths		United Kingdom	Royal Enfield	3	0
22	(United Kingdom) Tommy Robb		United Kingdom	Bultaco	3	0
23	(United Kingdom) Chris Anderson		United Kingdom	Yamaha	2	0
=	(United Kingdom) Jim Curry		United Kingdom	Honda	2	0
25	(West Germany) Günter Beer		West Germany	Honda	1	0
=	(France) Daniel Lhéraud		France	Yamaha	1	0
=	(Australia) Len Atlee		Australia	Cotton	1	0
=	(United Kingdom) Bill Smith		United Kingdom	Bultaco	1	0
=	(Italy) Giuseppe Visenzi		Italy	Aermacchi	1	0

=== 125cc ===
==== Riders' standings ====
Pos.	Rider	Bike	ESP (Spain)	FRG (West Germany)	NED (Netherlands)	GDR (East Germany)	TCH (Czechoslovakia)	FIN (Finland)	ULS (Northern Ireland)	MAN (Isle of Man)	NAT (Italy)	JPN (Japan)	Pts
1	(Switzerland) Luigi Taveri	Honda	2	1**^{F}**	2**^{F}**	1**^{F}**	1	2**^{F}**	1		1**^{F}**		46 (58)
2	(United Kingdom) Bill Ivy	Yamaha	1		1	3	3**^{F}**			1**^{F}**	3	1**^{F}**	40 (44)
3	(United Kingdom) Ralph Bryans	Honda	3	2		6	2	3	2**^{F}**		2		32 (33)
4	(United Kingdom) Phil Read	Yamaha	4**^{F}**	3	3**^{F}**	4		1	3	2	4	5	29 (37)
5	(New Zealand) Hugh Anderson	Suzuki			4		4	4	5	3			15
6	(Japan) Yoshimi Katayama	Suzuki				2		5				2	14
7	(United Kingdom) Frank Perris	Suzuki		4		5	5		6	5			10
8	(Japan) Akiyasu Motohashi	Yamaha			5							4	5
9	(Japan) Mitsuo Itoh	Suzuki										3	4
10	(Canada) Mike Duff	Yamaha			6					4			4
11	(United Kingdom) Tommy Robb	Yamaha							4				3
12	(Italy) Francesco Villa	Montesa	5										2
12	(West Germany) Hans-Georg Anscheidt	Suzuki		5									2
12	(United Kingdom) Peter Williams	EMC									5		2
15	(Spain) José Medrano	Bultaco	6										1
15	(West Germany) Herbert Mann	MZ		6									1
15	(East Germany) Friedhelm Kohlar	MZ					6						1
15	(East Germany) Hartmut Bischoff	MZ						6					1
15	(United Kingdom) Mike Hailwood	Honda								6			1
15	(West Germany) Walter Scheimann	Honda									6		1
15	(Japan) Yasuhara Yuzawa	Yamaha										6	1
Pos.	Rider	Bike	ESP (Spain)	FRG (West Germany)	NED (Netherlands)	GDR (East Germany)	TCH (Czechoslovakia)	FIN (Finland)	ULS (Northern Ireland)	MAN (Isle of Man)	NAT (Italy)	JPN (Japan)	Pts

Race key
Colour	Result
Gold	Winner
Silver	2nd place
Bronze	3rd place
Green	Points finish
Blue	Non-points finish
Blue	Non-classified finish (NC)
Purple	Retired (Ret)
Red	Did not qualify (DNQ)
Black	Disqualified (DSQ)
White	Did not start (DNS)
White	Withdrew (WD)
White	Race cancelled (C)
Blank	Did not practice (DNP)
Blank	Excluded (EX)
Blank	Did not arrive (DNA)
Blank	Did not enter (empty cell)
Annotation	Meaning
P	Pole position
F	Fastest lap
Rider key
Colour	Meaning
Light blue	Rookie rider

==== Constructors' standings ====
Each constructor is awarded the same number of points as their best placed rider in each race.

Pos.	Constructor	ESP (Spain)	FRG (West Germany)	NED (Netherlands)	GDR (East Germany)	TCH (Czechoslovakia)	FIN (Finland)	ULS (Northern Ireland)	MAN (Isle of Man)	NAT (Italy)	JPN (Japan)	Pts
1	(Japan) Honda	2	1	2	1	1	2	1	6	1		46 (59)
2	(Japan) Yamaha	1	3	1	3	3	1	3	1	3	1	44 (60)
3	(Japan) Suzuki		4	4	2	4	4	5	3		2	25 (30)
4	(East Germany) MZ		6			6	6					3
5	(Spain) Montesa	5										2
5	(United Kingdom) EMC									5		2
7	(Spain) Bultaco	6										1
Pos.	Constructor	ESP (Spain)	FRG (West Germany)	NED (Netherlands)	GDR (East Germany)	TCH (Czechoslovakia)	FIN (Finland)	ULS (Northern Ireland)	MAN (Isle of Man)	NAT (Italy)	JPN (Japan)	Pts

=== 50cc Standings ===
Place	Rider	Number	Country	Machine	Points	Wins
1	(West Germany) Hans-Georg Anscheidt		West Germany	Suzuki	28	2
2	(United Kingdom) Ralph Bryans		United Kingdom	Honda	26	1
3	(Switzerland) Luigi Taveri		Switzerland	Honda	26	2
4	(New Zealand) Hugh Anderson		New Zealand	Suzuki	16	0
5	(Japan) Yoshimi Katayama		Japan	Suzuki	10	1
6	(Australia) Barry Smith		Australia	Derbi	3	0
=	(West Germany) Ernst Degner		West Germany	Suzuki	3	0
=	(Japan) Mitsuo Itoh		Japan	Suzuki	3	0
9	(Spain) Angel Nieto		Spain	Derbi	2	0
=	(West Germany) Oswald Dittrich		West Germany	Kreidler	2	0
=	(United Kingdom) Brian Gleed		United Kingdom	Honda	2	0
=	(United Kingdom) Tommy Robb		United Kingdom	Bridgestone	2	0
13	(Netherlands) Cees van Dongen		Netherlands	Kreidler	1	0
=	(Japan) Isao Morishita		Japan	Bridgestone	1	0
=	(United Kingdom) Dave Simmonds		United Kingdom	Honda	1	0
=	(Switzerland) André Roth		Switzerland	Derbi	1	0
=	(Australia) Jack Findlay		Australia	Bridgestone	1	0
