= Fritz Scheidegger =

Swiss sidecar racer (1930–1967)

- Scheidegger in 1964
- Nationality: Swiss
- Born: 30 December 1930
- Died: 26 March 1967 (aged 36)
Motorcycle racing career statistics
Grand Prix motorcycle racing
Active years	1957 - 1966
First race	1957 Italian Grand Prix
Last race	1966 Belgian Grand Prix
First win	1959 French Grand Prix
Last win	1966 Belgian Grand Prix
Championships	Sidecars - 1965, 1966
Starts / Wins / Podiums / Poles / F. laps / Points; 36 / 16 / 34
Isle of Man TT career
TTs contested	7 (1959-1966)
TT wins	1
TT podiums	5

Fritz Scheidegger (Max Friedrich Scheidegger, 30 December 1930 in Langenthal - 26 March 1967 Mallory Park, England) was a Swiss sidecar racer who won two Sidecar World Championships.

Scheidegger began racing in the 500 cc solo class, becoming Swiss champion before turning to sidecar competition teaming with Horst Burkhardt to race in grasstrack sidecars. They began their world championship career soon after in 1957 at Monza at the final Grand Prix of the season, finishing an impressive fourth.

1958 brought no world championship success on an underpowered BMW, but 1959 began with a win in the first Grand Prix in France at Clermont-Ferrand followed by third at the Isle of Man TT on the Clypse Course followed by fifth in Germany and a third in Belgium saw the team finish the championship in third overall.

For the 1960 season, they had no wins, but a series of second and third places meant the team ended up in second position overall. The 1961 season produced two wins at France and Belgium and three runner up positions, but they again finished second in the championship.

In the 1962 season, Scheidegger first teamed with British passenger John Robinson, after Burkhardt initially left to race solos, then teamed with Florian Camathias. By the end of season they were in third position after a win, a second and a third. 1963 was again with Robinson, and again a third place in the championship, following a win, two seconds and a third. The 1964 season began with a win in France and ended with a win in Germany along with a second and a third to clinch them second place in the world title.

1965 was a dominant performance from Scheidegger and Robinson with four wins and three second places netting them the world championship at the last round at Monza. If 1965 was a great performance, 1966 was even more so with the team winning every race, but with much controversy. They were excluded for a fuel irregularity at the Isle of Man TT, awarding the championship to Max Deubel and Emil Hörner, but reinstated three months later on appeal.

Scheidegger was killed while leading a race at Mallory Park in 1967. Scheidegger's BMW outfit crashed at high speed at Shaw's Corner after a defective bracket holding both the rear brake torque arm and the gear change cross shaft failed. At the following inquest, it was also disclosed that the bracket had not been properly brazed and that its brazing had been cracked for some considerable time. John Robinson suffered a broken leg and retired from the sport.

Sporting positions
Preceded by Max Deubel; With: Emil Horner	World Sidecar Champion; 1965–1966; With: John Robinson	Succeeded by Klaus Enders; With: Ralf Englehardt
