= Heiner Fleischmann =

German motorcycle racer

- Nationality: German
- Born: 2 February 1914; Amberg, German Empire
- Died: 25 December 1963 (aged 49); Munich, West Germany
Motorcycle racing career statistics
Isle of Man TT career
TTs contested	2 (1936, 1939)
TT wins	0
TT podiums	1

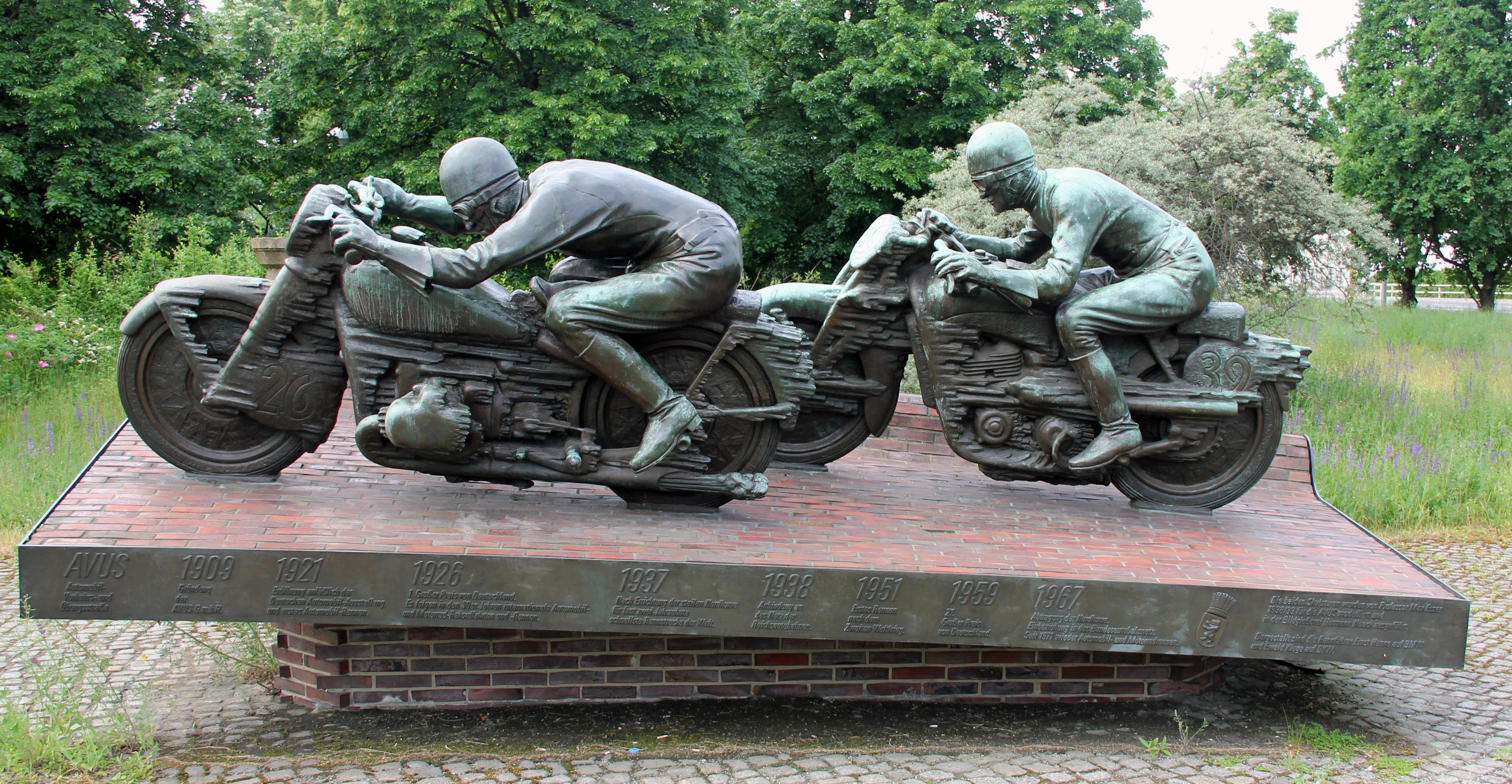
Sculpture, "Avus" by Max Esser, 1938, Messedamm, Berlin-Westend, Germany

Heiner Fleischmann (2 February 1914 — 25 December 1963) was a German motorcycle racer before and after World War II.

Fleischmann raced mainly for the NSU company.

== Career ==
- 1936 German champion in the 350 cc category on an NSU.
- 1937 German champion in the 350 cc category on an NSU.
- 1939 European champion in the 350 cc category on a DKW, German champion in the 350 cc category on a DKW.
- 1950 German champion in the 350 cc category on an NSU.

Sporting positions
Preceded by Ted Mellors	350 cc Motorcycle European Champion; 1939	Succeeded by Fergus Anderson (1947)
