= Akiyasu Motohashi =

Japanese motorcycle racer

- Nationality: Japanese
- Born: October 1939 (age 87)
Motorcycle racing career statistics
Grand Prix motorcycle racing
Active years	1964, 1966 - 1967
First race	1964 125cc Japanese Grand Prix
Last race	1967 250cc Japanese Grand Prix
Team	Yamaha
Starts / Wins / Podiums / Poles / F. laps / Points; 6 / 0 / 3 / N/A / N/A / 20

Akiyasu Motohashi (Japanese: 本橋明泰, Hepburn: Motohashi; born October 1939) is a former Grand Prix motorcycle road racer from Japan. Motohashi began his Grand Prix career in 1964 with Yamaha. He enjoyed his best season in 1966 when he finished the season in eighth place in the 125cc world championship.

Sporting positions
Preceded by Benny Hidajet	Macau Motorcycle Grand Prix Winner; 1971	Succeeded by Ikujiro Takai
