= List of road junctions in the United Kingdom: R =

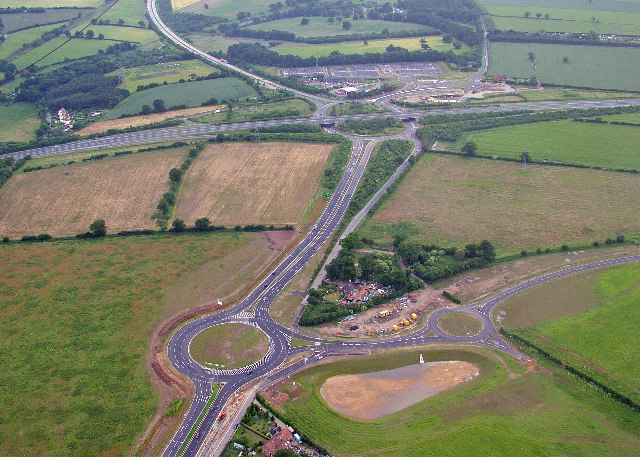
Thickthorn Interchange

This is part of the list of road junctions in the United Kingdom.

Many road junctions are named after pubs. For more information regarding the derivation of pub names see pub names.

== R ==
Junction Name	Type	Location	Roads	Grid Reference	Notes
Rackham's Corner		Corton, Suffolk	A12 Yarmouth Road; B1375 Gorleston Road	TM528976	
Raddon Down Cross	Crossroads	Colebrooke, Devon	unclass. roads to: Copplestone; Barnstaple Cross (to Crediton); Yeoford; Coleford	50.7975°N 3.7154°W	Named on fingerpost
Radland Cross	Crossroads	St Dominick, Cornwall	unclass.; unclass.	SX396680	
Raith Interchange		Bothwell, South Lanarkshire	M74 J5; A725 Bellshill Road	55°48′09″N 4°03′14″W	
Rashwood: aka Wychbold		Droitwich, Worcestershire	M5 J5; A38 Worcester Road	52°17′17″N 2°07′14″W	
Ratcliffe Junction		Ratcliffe-on-the-Wreake, Leicestershire	A46; Ratcliffe Road	52°43′19″N 1°04′33″W	
Ravensthorpe Gyratory		Ravensthorpe, West Yorkshire	A644 Huddersfield Road	53°40′47″N 1°39′47″W	
Rawdon Crossroads		Rawdon, West Yorkshire	A65 New Side Road; B6152 Micklefield Lane; B6152 Harrogate Road	53°51′11″N 1°41′06″W	
Ray Hall Interchange	Grade Separated Fork Interchange	West Midlands	M5; M6 J8	52°32′53″N 1°57′37″W	
Raynesway Park		Alvaston, Derbyshire	A6 Alvaston Bypass; A5111 Raynesway	52°54′05″N 1°25′40″W	
Red Bull		Church Lawton, Cheshire	A34; A50	53°05′38″N 2°15′28″W	
Red Gate		Caldecote, Warwickshire	A5 Watling Street; A444 Atherstone Road / Weddington Lane	52°33′38″N 1°29′7″W	
Red House		Doncaster, South Yorkshire	A1(M) J38; A1; A638 Great North Road (formerly A1); A638 Doncaster Road	53°34′41″N 1°12′45″W	
Red Post		Winterborne Kingston, Dorset	A31; Marsh Lane	SY883971	
Red Post Cross		Kingsdon, Somerset	A372 Crane Hill; B3151 Rocky Hill; B3151 Edmond's Hill	ST517254	
Red Rover		Barnes, LB Richmond upon Thames	A306 Roehampton Lane; A306 Rocks Lane; A205 Upper Richmond Road; B306 Queens Ride	51°27′55″N 0°14′38″W	
Redbridge Roundabout	Roundabout Interchange	Redbridge, London	A406 South Woodford to Barking Relief Road; A12 Eastern Avenue; Redbridge Lane East; Royston Gardens	51°34′34″N 0°02′39″E	
Redbridge Roundabout		Stantonbury, Milton Keynes	H3 (A422) Monks Way; V8 (B4034) Marlborough Street	52°03′42″N 0°45′28″W	
Redbridge Roundabout		Oxford, Oxfordshire	A423 Southern Bypass Road; A4144 Abingdon Road	51°43′42″N 1°14′53″W	
Redmoor Interchange		Redmoor, Milton Keynes	A5; H9 Groveway; V6 Grafton Street	52°00′47″N 0°44′20″W	
Reen Cross	Crossroads	Goonhavern, Cornwall	unclass.; unclass.	SW779538	
Reeves Corner		Croydon, London	A236 Roman Way; Cairo New Road; Church Road; Church Street; Tamworth Road	51°22′26″N 0°06′21″W	Named after House of Reeves, a family-owned furniture shop that still trades there
Regent's Park		Marylebone, London	A501 Marylebone Road; A4201 Portland Place	51°31′24″N 0°08′47″W	
Reigate Hill Interchange		Reigate, Surrey	M25 J8; A217 Reigate Hill; A217 Brighton Road	51°15′30″N 0°11′51″W	
Reperry Cross		near Churchtown, Cornwall	unclass.; unclass.; unclass.	SX046633	
Ribble Valley Interchange		Preston, Lancashire	M6 J31; A59 Preston New Road	53°45′54″N 2°38′12″W	Locally known as the Tickled Trout, after the hotel on the junction
Riby Crossroads		Riby, Lincolnshire	A18 Barton Road; A1173 Keelby Road	TA185082	
Richmond Circus		Richmond, LB Richmond upon Thames	A316 Twickenham Road; A316 Lower Mortlake Road; A307 Kew Road	51°27′54″N 0°17′59″W	
Ripple Road Junction		Barking, LB Barking and Dagenham	A13 Alfreds Way; A13 Ripple Road; A123 Ripple Road; A1153 Lodge Avenue	51°31′58″N 0°06′33″E	now signed as Lodge Avenue Junction
Riseholme Roundabout	Roundabout	Lincoln, Lincolnshire	A15 Ermine Street; A46 Lincoln Bypass; B1226 Riseholme Road; St George's Lane	SK976740	aka Lodge House Junction or Lodge Avenue
Roadhead Roundabout		Lochwinnoch, Renfrewshire	A737; A760; unclass.	NS366577	
Robin Hood Gate	Roundabout	Kingston Vale, Royal Borough of Kingston	A3 Robin Hood Way; A3 Roehampton Vale; A308 Kingston Vale; Robin Hood Gate	51°26′09″N 0°15′21″W	
Robin Hood Roundabout		Newbury, Berkshire	A4 London Road, Western Avenue; A339 (formerly A34) Donnington Link; B4009 Hermitage Road; London Road	51°24′25″N 1°19′5″W	Named after the pub of the same name on the corner
Robroyston		Robroyston, Glasgow	M80 J2; B765 Saughs Road; New Station Road	55°53′24″N 4°10′46″W	
The Rocket: aka Queens Drive Flyover		Liverpool, Merseyside	A5080 Bowring Park Road; A5058 Queens Drive	53°24′26″N 2°54′05″W	Named after the pub, taking its name from Stevenson's loco
Roebuck Gate		Stevenage, Hertfordshire	B198 Stevenage Road (formerly A1); Hertford Road (formerly A602)	TL246221	
Roehampton Lane Junction		Roehampton, London	A3 Kingston Road; A306 Roehampton Lane	51°26′40″N 0°14′04″W	
Roehyde		Hatfield, Hertfordshire	A1(M) J3; A414 North Orbital Road (formerly A405); A1001 Comet Way (formerly A1); A1001 Roehyde Way (formerly A1)	51°45′09″N 0°14′42″W	
Rolls Park Roundabout		Debden, Essex	A113 High Road; A113 Abridge Road; A1168 Chigwell Lane	51°38′06″N 0°05′13″E	
Roneo Corner		Romford, LB Havering	A124 Rush Green Road; A124 Hornchurch Road; A125 Rainham Road; A125 Rom Valley Way	51°33′56″N 0°11′16″E	
Rooksley Roundabout		Rooksley, Milton Keynes	H4 Dansteed Way; V6 Grafton Street	52°02′46″N 0°46′45″W	
Roscoe's Roundabout		Cheadle, Greater Manchester	M60 J2 (formerly M63; A560 Stockport Road	53°23′53″N 2°12′03″W	Named after a builders yard long since vanished and replaced by offices
Ropery Lane Roundabout		Chester-le-Street, County Durham	A167 Park Road South; A167 Mains Park Road; B1284 Rotary Way; Ropery Lane, Chester-le-Street	54°51′06″N 1°33′53″W	Durham County Cricket Club Entrance
Rose Hill Roundabout		Carlisle, Cumbria	M6 J43; A69 Warwick Road	54°53′43″N 2°53′14″W	
Rose Hill Roundabout		Oxford, Oxfordshire	A4142 Eastern By-pass Road; A4158 Rose Hill; Oxford Road	51°43′30″N 1°13′26″W	
Rosehill Roundabout		Rosehill, LB Sutton	A217 Reigate Avenue; A217 Bishopsfield Road; B278 Wrythe Lane; B278 Green Lane; A297 St Helier Avenue; B2230 Rose Hill	51°23′04″N 0°11′24″W	
Rotherway Roundabout		Rotherham, South Yorkshire	A630 Rotherway; A631 West Bawtry Road	53°24′20″N 1°20′56″W	
Rougham Corner	Crossroads	Breckland, Norfolk	unclassified tracks	TL784921	
Rowborough Corner		Brading, Isle of Wight	A3055 Beaper Shute, N; B3330 Carpenter Lane, E; A3055 Rowborough Lane, S	50.6916°N 1.1442°W	
Rownhams Interchange		Southampton, Hampshire	M27 J3; M271	50°56′45″N 1°28′36″W	
Royal Holloway Junction		Egham, Surrey	A30 London Road; A30 Egham Hill; A328 St Judges Road; Bakeham Lane	SU995705	
Rudmore Roundabout		Portsmouth, Hampshire	M275; A3 Mile End Road; A3 Twyford Road; A3 Stamshaw Road; A2047 Kingston Cr.	SU645020	
Running Horse, aka London Road Railway Station	Roundabout	Bracknell	A329 London Road, NW / SE; Lily Hill Drive, NE; Broad Lane, SW	51.4136°N 0.7318°W	
Rush Green Roundabout	Roundabout Interchange	Hertford, Hertfordshire	A10; A414; B1502 Stanstead Road (formerly A414); Thieves Lane (footpath)	51°47′59″N 0°02′35″W	
Rushyford Roundabout		Rushyford, County Durham	A167; A689	NZ283289	
Ruxley Corner	Roundabout	Ruxley, LB Bexley	A221 Maidstone Road (NW); A223 North Cray Road (NE); A223 Edgington Way (SW); B2173 Maidstone Road (E); Sandy Lane (S)	TQ480706	
Ryton Old Vicarage		Ryton-on-Dunsmore, Warwickshire	A45 London Road; A445 Leamington Road; Wolston Lane	SP392742	
