= 1966 Isle of Man TT =

Annual motorcycle racing event

The 1966 Isle of Man TT races were held later in the year than the traditional May/June fortnight due to the seamen's strike which affected access to the Island for all concerned. After the strike ended in July, the TT races were re-organised to fit with the remaining events in the Grand Prix calendar and preceded the September Manx Grand Prix, meaning nearly a month of continuous disruption to everyday Isle of Man affairs and much concerted effort from the motorcycle trade and journalists together with the many volunteers and support workers.

== 1966 Isle of Man Lightweight TT 125cc final standings ==
3 Laps (113.19 Miles) Mountain Course.

Place	Rider	Number	Country	Machine	Speed	Time	Points
1	(United Kingdom) Bill Ivy		United Kingdom	Yamaha	97.66 mph	1:09.32.8	8
2	(United Kingdom) Phil Read		United Kingdom	Yamaha	96.96 mph	1:10.03.2	6
3	(New Zealand) Hugh Anderson		New Zealand	Suzuki	96.82 mph	1:10.09.2	4
4	(Canada) Mike Duff		Canada	Yamaha	95.42 mph	1:11.11.2	3
5	(United Kingdom) Frank Perris		United Kingdom	Suzuki	95.13 mph	1:11.24.0	2
6	(United Kingdom) Mike Hailwood		United Kingdom	Honda	95.07 mph	1:11.26.6	1

== 1966 Sidecar TT final standings ==
3 Laps (113.19 Miles) Mountain Course.

Place	Rider	Number	Country	Machine	Speed	Time	Points
1	(Switzerland) Fritz Scheidegger/J.Robinson		Switzerland	BMW	90.76 mph	1:14.50.0	8
2	(West Germany) Max Deubel/Emil Horner		West Germany	BMW	90.75 mph	1:14.50.8	6
3	(West Germany) Georg Auerbacher/W.Kalauch		West Germany	BMW	88.35 mph	1:16.52.4	4
4	(West Germany) Klaus Enders/Ralf Engelhardt		West Germany	BMW	87.94 mph	1:17.14.4	3
5	(United Kingdom) Tony Baitup/G.Geer		United Kingdom	Triumph	87.41 mph	1:17.42.6	2
6	(United Kingdom) Barry Dungworth/N.Caddow		United Kingdom	BMW	80.90 mph	1:19.33.4	1

== 1966 Isle of Man Lightweight TT 250cc final standings ==
6 Laps (226.38 Miles) Mountain Course.

Place	Rider	Number	Country	Machine	Speed	Time	Points
1	(United Kingdom) Mike Hailwood		United Kingdom	Honda	101.79 mph	2:13.26.0	8
2	(United Kingdom) Stuart Graham		United Kingdom	Honda	97.49 mph	2:19.20.0	6
3	(United Kingdom) Peter Inchley		United Kingdom	Villiers	91.63 mph	2:28.34.4	4
4	(Czechoslovakia) František Šťastný		Czechoslovakia	Jawa	89.87 mph	2:31.09.0	3
5	(Australia) Jack Findlay		Australia	Bultaco	88.82 mph	2:32.56.2	2
6	(United Kingdom) Bill Smith		United Kingdom	Bultaco	87.63 mph	2:35.01.4	1

== 1966 Isle of Man Junior TT 350cc final standings ==
6 Laps (236.38 Miles) Mountain Course.

Place	Rider	Number	Country	Machine	Speed	Time	Points
1	(Italy) Giacomo Agostini		Italy	MV Agusta	100.87 mph	2:14.40.4	8
2	(United Kingdom) Peter Williams		United Kingdom	AJS	99.35 mph	2:16.44.4	6
3	(United Kingdom) Chris Conn		United Kingdom	Norton	92.56 mph	2:24.46.6	4
4	(Australia) Jack Ahearn		Australia	Norton	92.52 mph	2:26.49.8	3
5	(Czechoslovakia) František Boček		Czechoslovakia	Jawa	92.45 mph	2:26.56.4	2
6	(United Kingdom) John Blanchard		United Kingdom	Seeley AJS	92.46 mph	2:27.14.2	1

== 1966 50cc Ultra-Lightweight TT final standings ==
3 Laps (113.19 Miles) Mountain Course.

Place	Rider	Number	Country	Machine	Speed	Time	Points
1	(Northern Ireland) Ralph Bryans		United Kingdom	Honda	85.66 mph	1:19.17.2	8
2	(Switzerland) Luigi Taveri		Switzerland	Honda	84.74 mph	1:20.08.4	6
3	(New Zealand) Hugh Anderson		New Zealand	Suzuki	83.14 mph	1:21.41.0	4
4	(West Germany) Ernst Degner		West Germany	Suzuki	81.96 mph	1:22.52.2	3
5	(United Kingdom) B.F.Gleed		United Kingdom	Honda	68.25 mph	1:39.31.0	2
6	(United Kingdom) Dave Simmonds		United Kingdom	Honda	67.70 mph	1:41.50.0	1

== 1966 Isle of Man Senior TT 500cc final standings ==
6 Laps (236.38 Miles) Mountain Course.

Place	Rider	Number	Country	Machine	Speed	Time	Points
1	(United Kingdom) Mike Hailwood		United Kingdom	Honda	103.11 mph	2:14.44.8	8
2	(Italy) Giacomo Agostini		Italy	MV Agusta	101.09 mph	2:14.22.6	6
3	(United Kingdom) Chris Conn		United Kingdom	Norton	95.57 mph	2:22.26.8	4
4	(United Kingdom) John Blanchard		United Kingdom	Seeley Matchless	95.02 mph	2:22.58.0	3
5	(United Kingdom) Ron Chandler		United Kingdom	Matchless	94.11 mph	2:24.20.4	2
6	(Czechoslovakia) František Šťastný		Czechoslovakia	Jawa	93.94 mph	2:24.36.0	1
