= Orvelte =

- Village
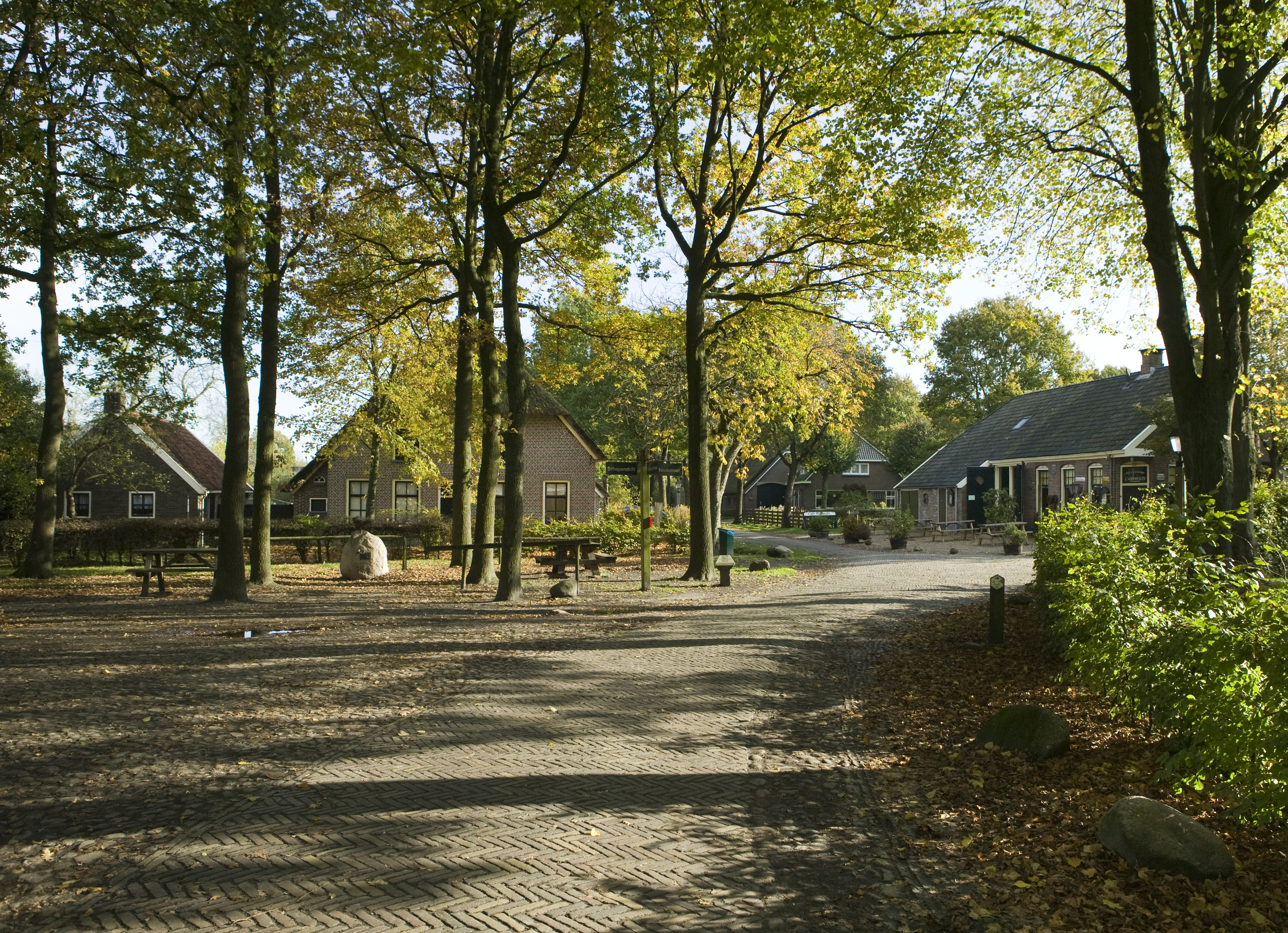
- The village square in 2008

- Location within Drenthe Location within Netherlands
- Coordinates: 52°50′37″N 6°39′35″E
- Country: Netherlands
- Province: Drenthe
- Municipality: Midden-Drenthe

Area
  - Total: 18.72 km^{2} (7.23 sq mi)
- Elevation: 17 m (56 ft)

Population (2021)
  - Total: 250
  - Density: 13/km^{2} (35/sq mi)
- Time zone: UTC+1 (CET)
  - Summer (DST): UTC+2 (CEST)
- Postal code: 9441
- Dialing code: 0593

Orvelte (Dutch pronunciation: [ˈɔrvɛltə]) is a village in the Dutch province of Drenthe. It is a part of the municipality of Midden-Drenthe, and lies about 18 km northeast of Hoogeveen.

Orvelte is a museum village. A number of events are held throughout the year featuring traditional Dutch activities.

== History ==
The village was first mentioned in 1362 as "in Oervelde", and probably means "other side of the (heath) field". Orvelte is an esdorp which developed in the Middle Ages on the road from Westerbork to Zweeloo. It may have been a daughter settlement of Westerbork.

The farm Bruntingerhof was built between 1560 and 1650, and is the oldest extant farm in Drenthe. It used to be located in the hamlet of Bruntinge, but was moved to Orvelte in the 1960s.

Orvelte was home to 140 people in 1840.

In 1917, a consortium of textile traders founded a flax factory in Orvelte along the Oranjekanaal. They appointed the Flemish straw flax buyer HF Reyntjens as director. After his death in 1952, he was succeeded by flax technician AT Krijnen, who wrote a history of the factory. The factory closed in 1968.

In 1967, the village was designated a protected site. It became a museum village and attempts were made to return the village to the layout of 1830. The brink (village square) has been restored and historical farms and barns from other villages which were scheduled to be demolished, have been purchased and moved to Orvelte. The former toll house was built around 1870 and is in use as a museum and tourist information site. Cars are no longer allowed in the village. A horse tram has been made available as public transport.

In the late 1970s, archaeologists built an Iron Age farm to the northwest of the village. It was built to show what recently excavated remains in Hijken may have looked like. The site is now managed by Staatsbosbeheer.

In September 2009, remains of a mammoth were found at the Oranjekanaal. The excavations found a one-meter tusk, a few molars and bones. Remains were also found in the immediate vicinity in 1991. These finds probably belong together. The jaw that was found in 1991 was missing two molars and the two molars previously found wer an exact match.

== Monument Village ==
Orvelte is now organized as a museum village and as a monument village because of the many historical sights in and around the village. In 1966, the village of Orvelte in the Netherlands had a population of 428 and 28 agricultural businesses. Concerns arose about the potential demolition or repurposing of the agricultural buildings due to land consolidation. The mayor, Louis Teunislieve, had been working towards transforming Orvelte into a recreational project and in 1967, the municipality decided to restore the village as a "living monument of historic rural architecture." Recognizing the need for new functions to sustain the village and its monuments, Orvelte was designated as a national protected village site. In 1968, the Orvelte Foundation was established under the leadership of the mayor to preserve the village and its historic architecture, maintain the natural beauty of the area, and provide educational and recreational opportunities while reducing dependence on agriculture.

In addition to the normal daily activities and residential function of the village, a large number of farms and other buildings are set up for the public. Cars are not allowed in Orvelte, but you can take a tour in a horse-drawn tram .

In the village you can see how people lived and worked in the past. There are also shops and restaurants. Throughout the year markets and other special events are often held in the village. Examples of attractions are:

- general store
- studios and galleries
- museums

The former 'Apple Museum' moved to Westerbork and in 2019 the Jan Kruis Museum, dedicated to the cartoonist Jan Kruis, opened in the building.

== Gallery ==
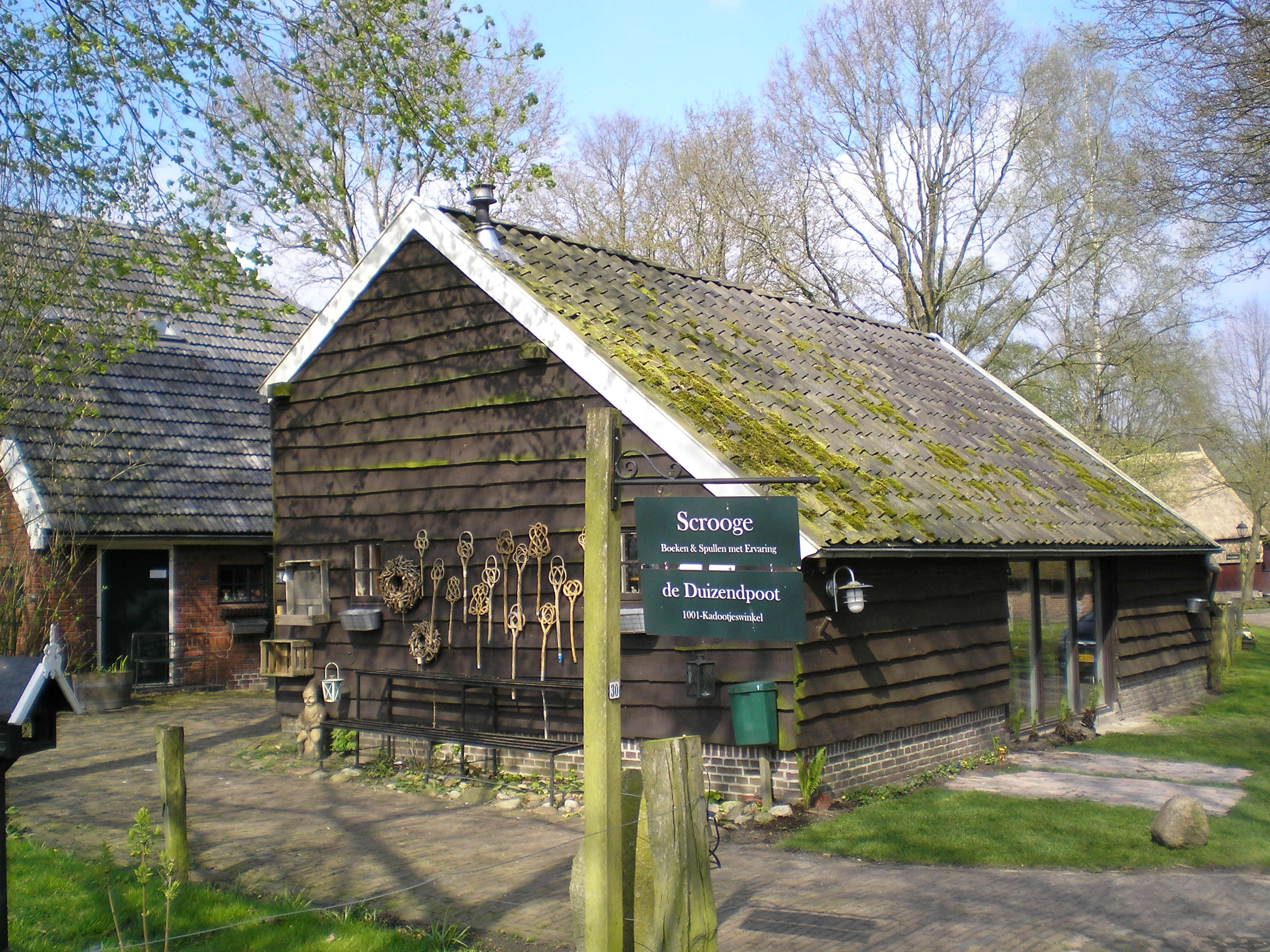
Shed in Orvelte

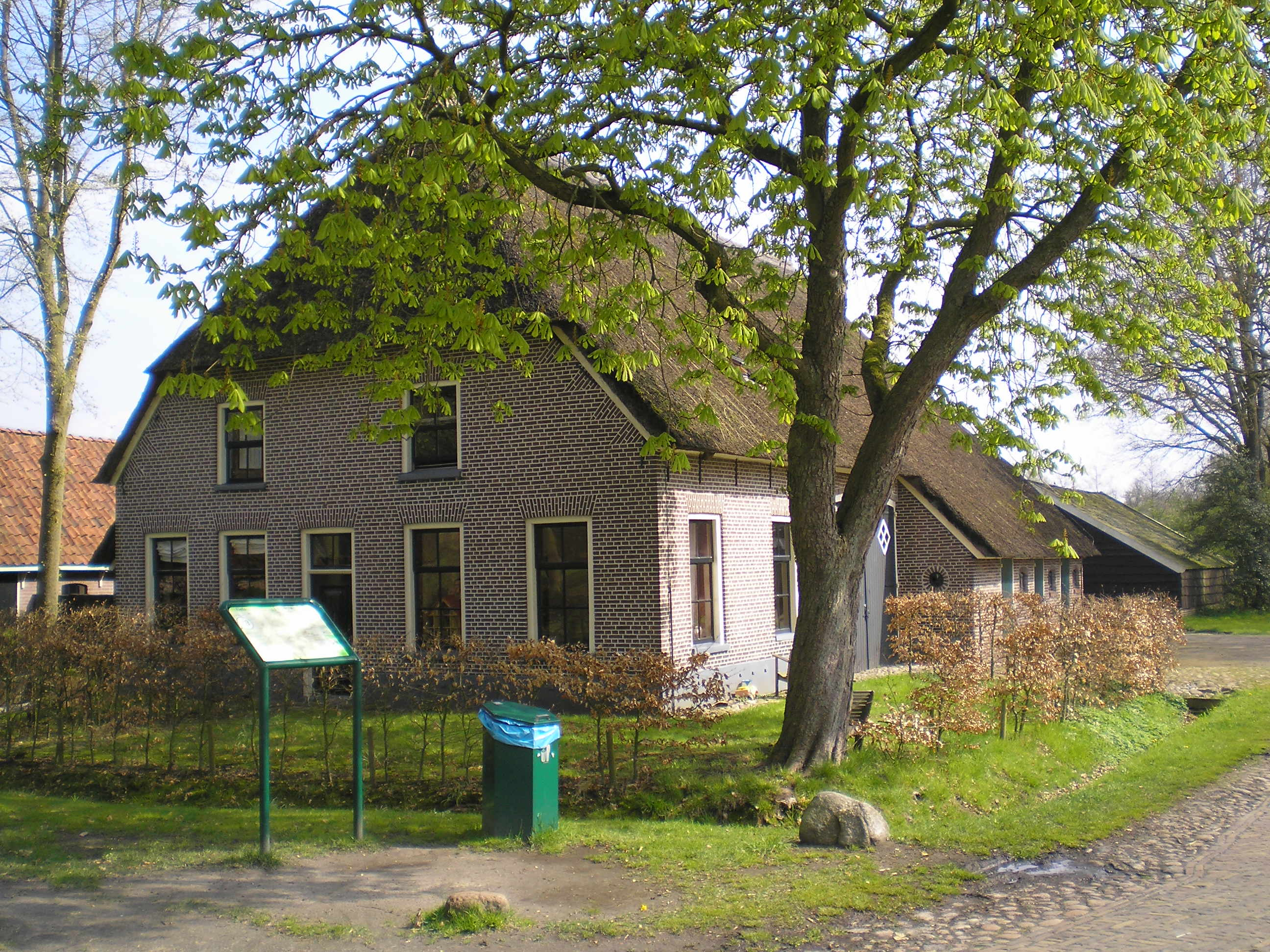
Farm in Orvelte

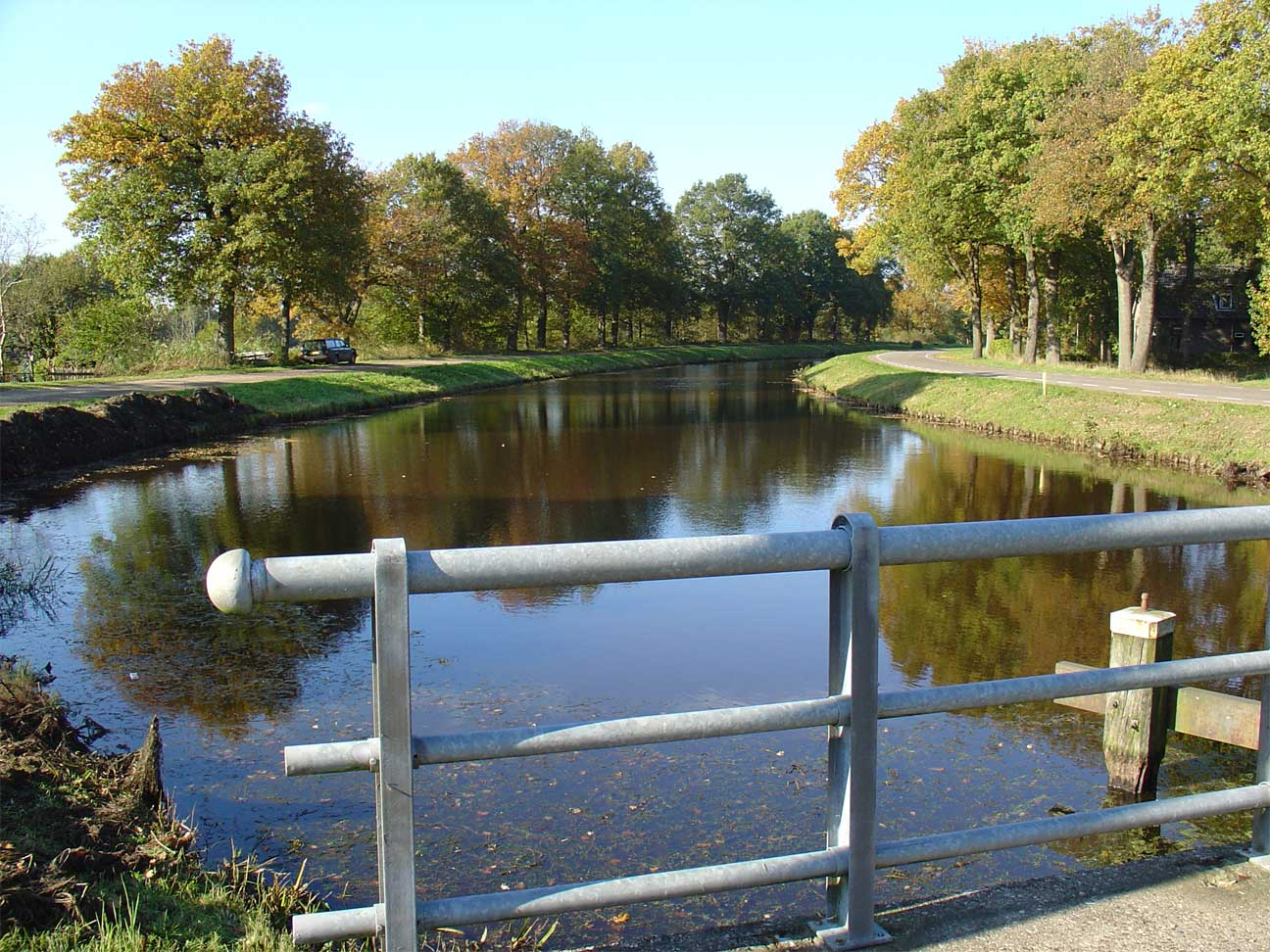
Oranjekanaal, the canal near Orvelte

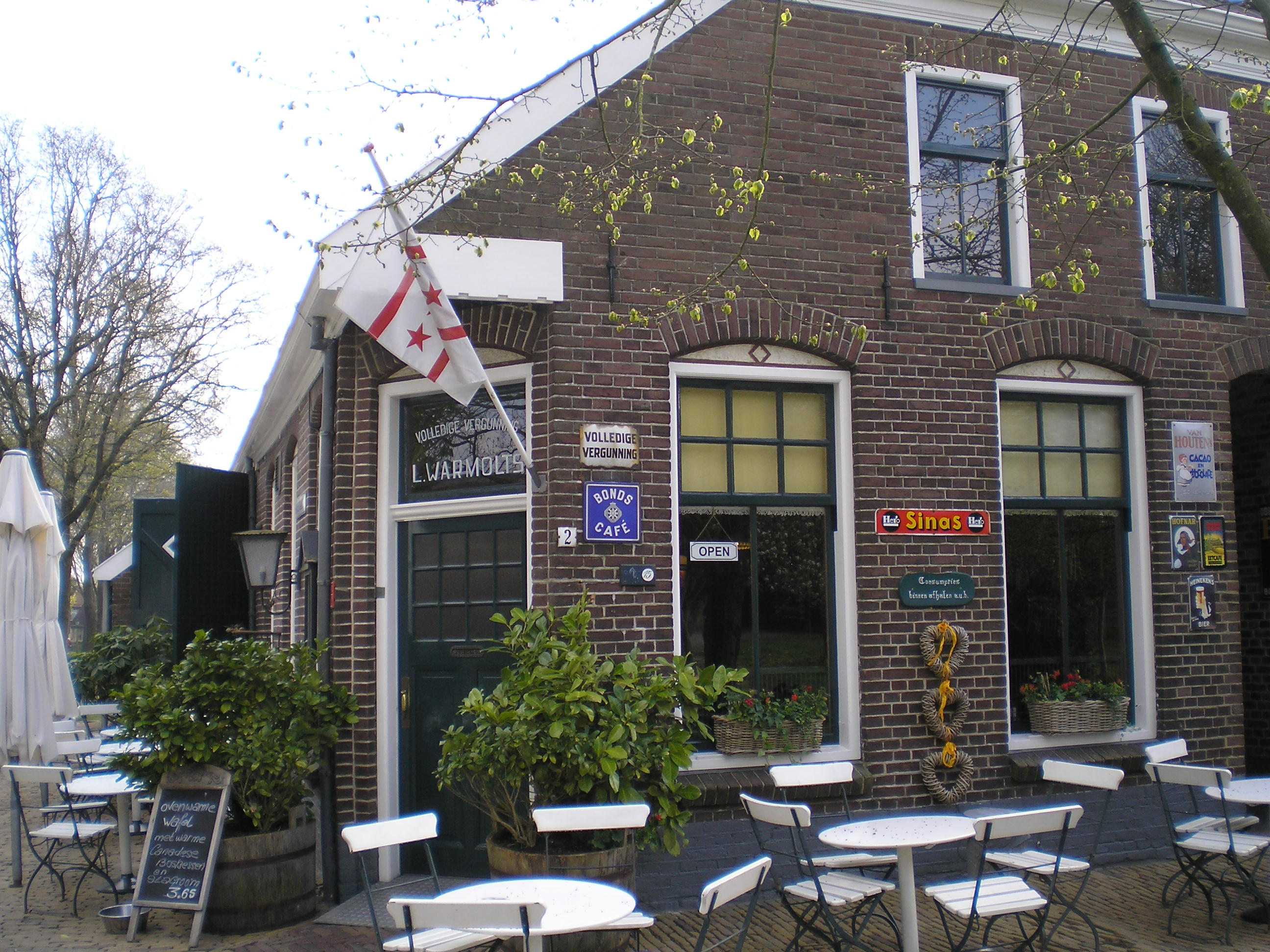
Cafe Warmolts
