= Westerbork (disambiguation) =

Westerbork may refer to:

== Places ==
- Westerbork (village), a village in the Netherlands
- Westerbork transit camp, a Nazi transit camp near Westerbork

== Other uses ==
- Westerbork Synthesis Radio Telescope, an aperture synthesis interferometer near Westerbork
