= Eursinge =

Eursinge may refer to several villages in Drenthe, Netherlands:

- Eursinge, Midden-Drenthe
- Eursinge, De Wolden
- Eursinge, Westerveld

See also:

- Eursing, another town in Drenthe
