= Zwiggelte =

- Village
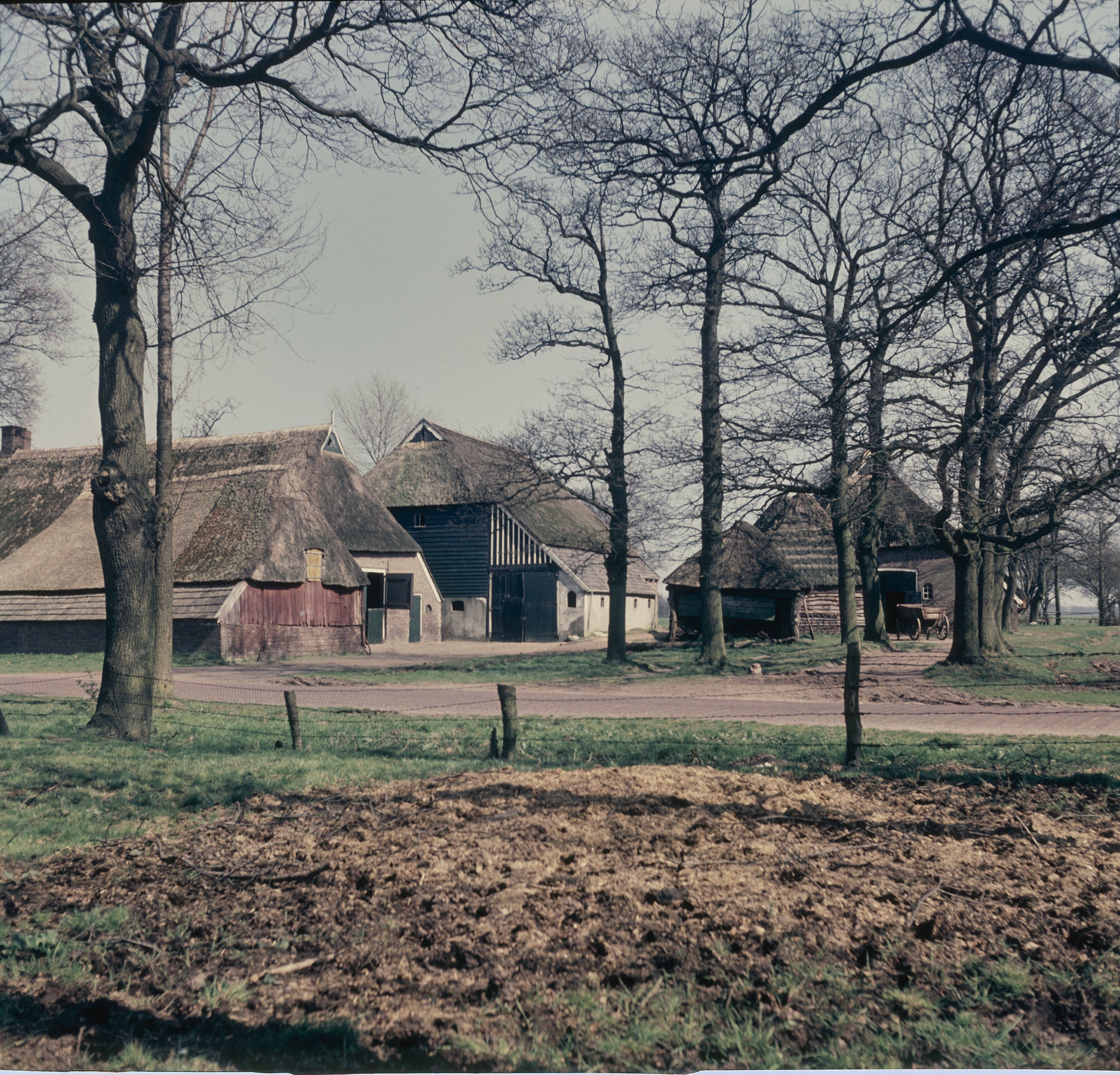
- Farms in Zwiggelte

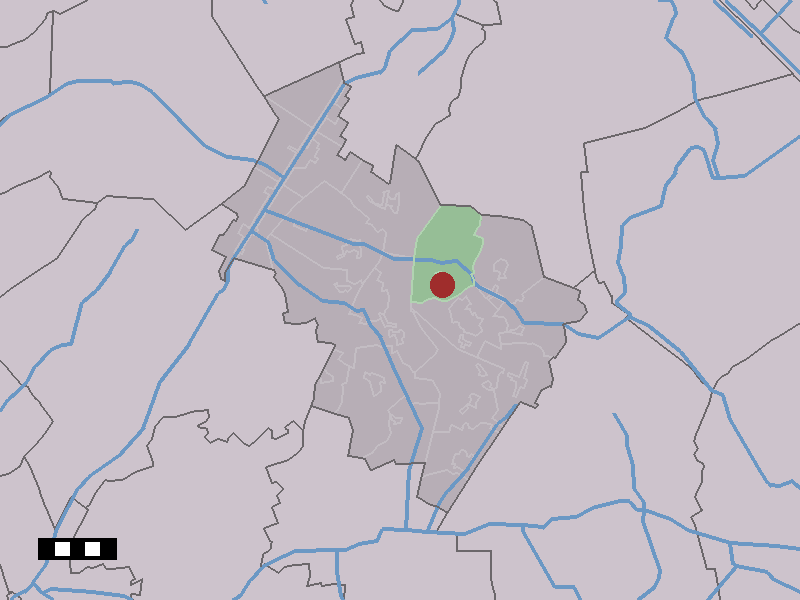
- The village (dark red) and the statistical district (light green) of Zwiggelte in the municipality of Midden-Drenthe.

- Location in the Netherlands Zwiggelte (Netherlands)
- Coordinates: 52°52′23″N 6°35′15″E
- Country: Netherlands
- Province: Drenthe
- Municipality: Midden-Drenthe

Area
  - Total: 23.43 km^{2} (9.05 sq mi)
- Elevation: 16 m (52 ft)

Population (2021)
  - Total: 470
  - Density: 20/km^{2} (52/sq mi)
- Time zone: UTC+1 (CET)
  - Summer (DST): UTC+2 (CEST)
- Postal code: 9433
- Dialing code: 0593

Zwiggelte is a village in the Dutch province of Drenthe. It is a part of the municipality of Midden-Drenthe, and lies about 15 km south of Assen.

The village was first mentioned around 1400 as Wolbert to Swicler, and could mean "meadow with cattle". Zwiggelte is an esdorp which developed in the Middle Ages on the road from Westerbork to Assen. It might have been a satellite of Westerbork. It used to have two brinks (village squares). Of the northern brink only a dobbe (natural pool) remains.

Zwiggelte was home to 184 people in 1840. The Westerbork Synthesis Radio Telescope and a large part of Westerbork transit camp were technically located in Zwiggelte and not Westerbork.
