= Spier =

- Hamlet
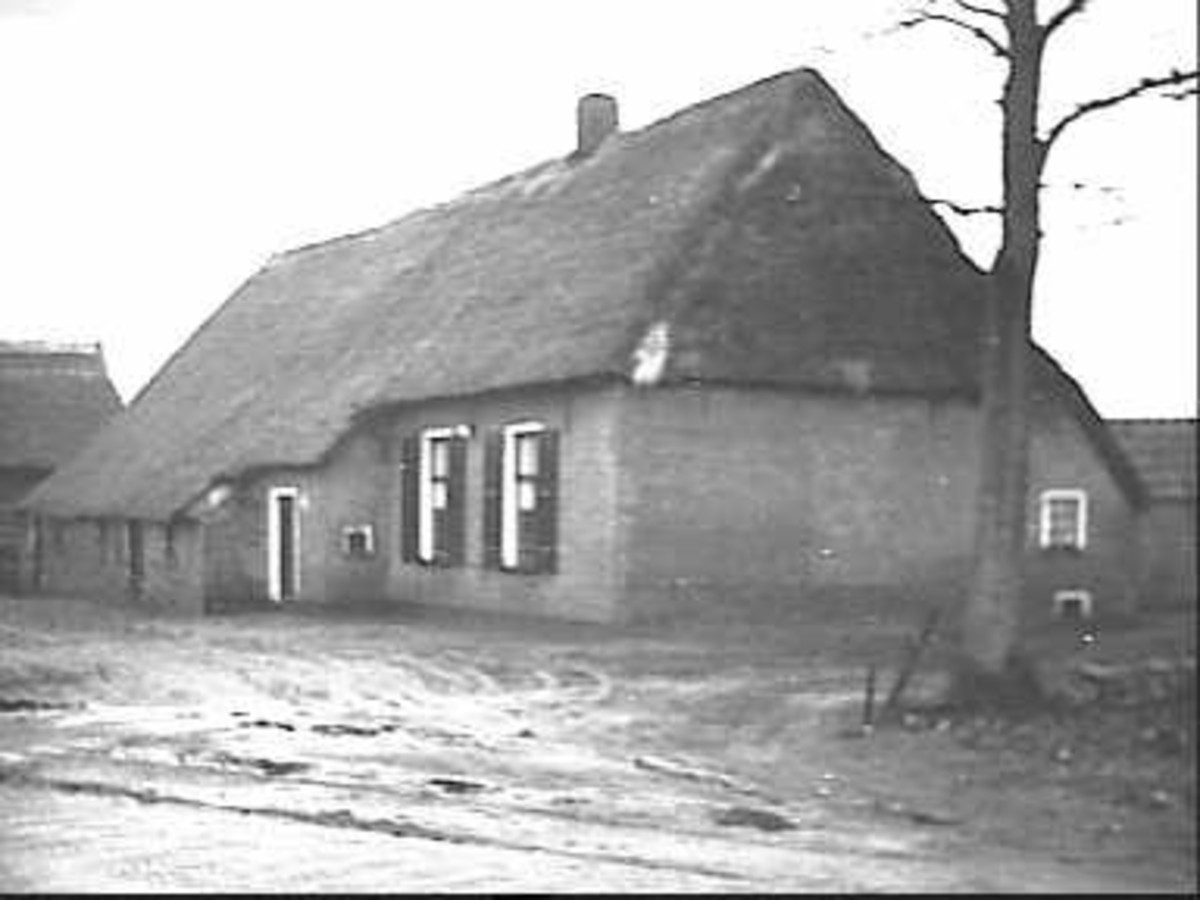
- Farm in Spier

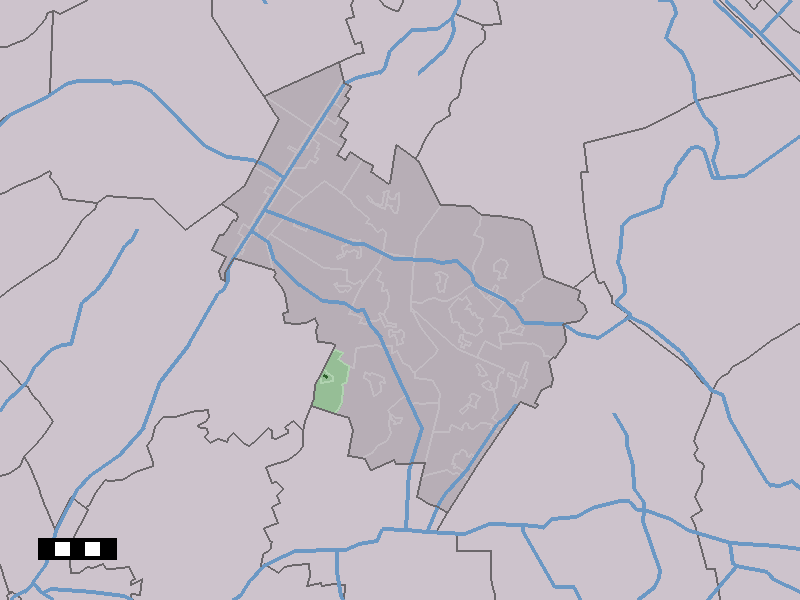
- The centre (dark green) and the statistical district (light green) of Spier in the municipality of Midden-Drenthe.

- Location in the Netherlands Spier (Netherlands)
- Coordinates: 52°49′6″N 6°28′3″E
- Country: Netherlands
- Province: Drenthe
- Municipality: Midden-Drenthe

Population (2008)
  - Total: 129
- Time zone: UTC+1 (CET)
  - Summer (DST): UTC+2 (CEST)
- Postal code: 9417
- Dialing code: 0593

Spier is a hamlet in the Dutch province of Drenthe. It is located in the municipality of Midden-Drenthe, about 11 km north of Hoogeveen.

In 2001, the hamlet of Spier had 91 inhabitants. The built-up area of the hamlet was 0.036 km^{2}, and contained 35 residences. The statistical area "Spier", which can also include the surrounding countryside, has a population of around 370.
