= Midden-Drenthe =

- Municipality
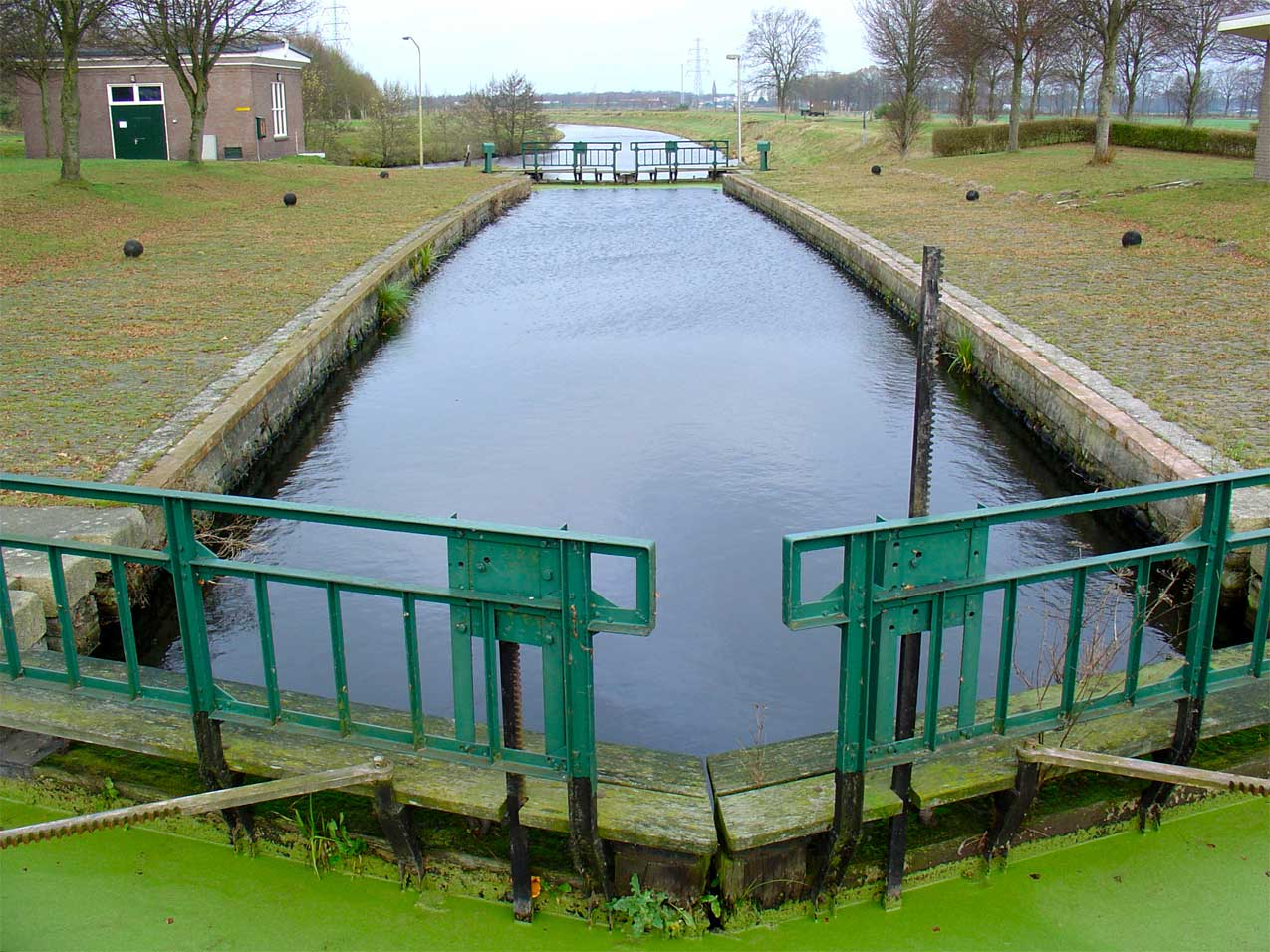
- Canal through Midden-Drenthe

- Flag Coat of arms

- Location in Drenthe
- Coordinates: 52°52′N 6°31′E
- Country: Netherlands
- Province: Drenthe
- Established: 1 January 1998
- Renamed: 1 January 2000

Government
  - Body: Municipal council
  - Mayor: Mieke Damsma (D66)

Area
  - Total: 345.87 km^{2} (133.54 sq mi)
  - Land: 340.51 km^{2} (131.47 sq mi)
  - Water: 5.36 km^{2} (2.07 sq mi)
- Elevation: 14 m (46 ft)

Population (January 2021)
  - Total: 33,381
  - Density: 98/km^{2} (250/sq mi)
- Time zone: UTC+1 (CET)
  - Summer (DST): UTC+2 (CEST)
- Postcode: 7938, 9410–9442
- Area code: 0528, 0592, 0593
- Website: www.middendrenthe.nl
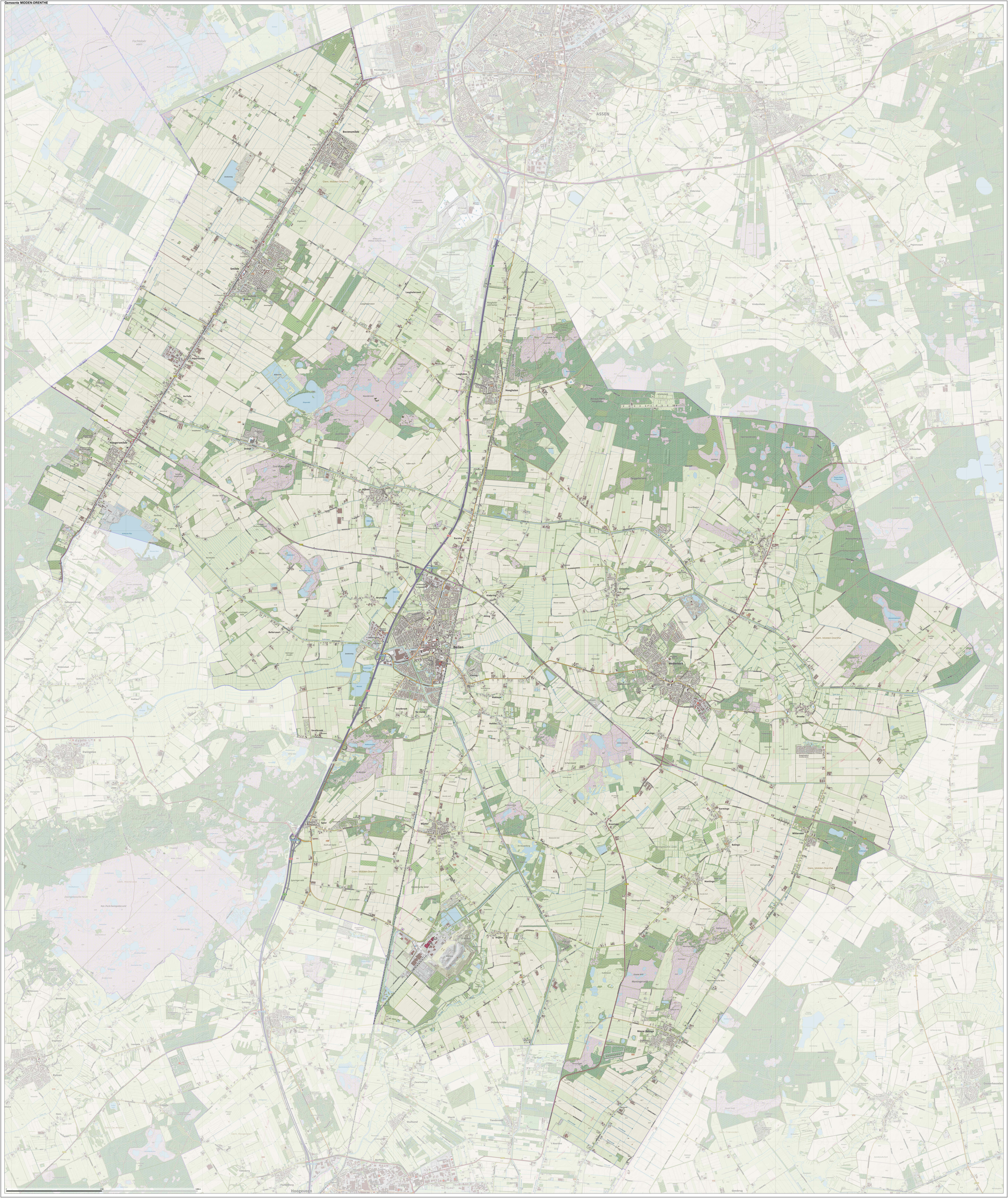
- Dutch Topographic map of the municipality of Midden-Drenthe, June 2015

Midden-Drenthe (Dutch pronunciation: [ˌmɪdə(n) ˈdrɛntə]) is a municipality in the northeastern Netherlands. The municipality was created in 1998, in a merger of the former municipalities of Beilen, Smilde, and Westerbork. Between 1998 and 2000, the name of the municipality was Middenveld.

== Population centres ==
- Balinge
- Beilen
- Bovensmilde
- Brunsting
- Bruntinge
- Drijber
- Elp
- Eursinge
- Garminge
- Hijken
- Hijkersmilde
- Holthe
- Hoogersmilde
- Hooghalen
- Laaghalen
- Laaghalerveen
- Lieving
- Makkum
- Mantinge
- Nieuw-Balinge
- Oranje
- Orvelte
- Smalbroek
- Smilde
- Spier
- Terhorst
- Westerbork
- Wijster
- Witteveen
- Zuidveld
- Zwiggelte

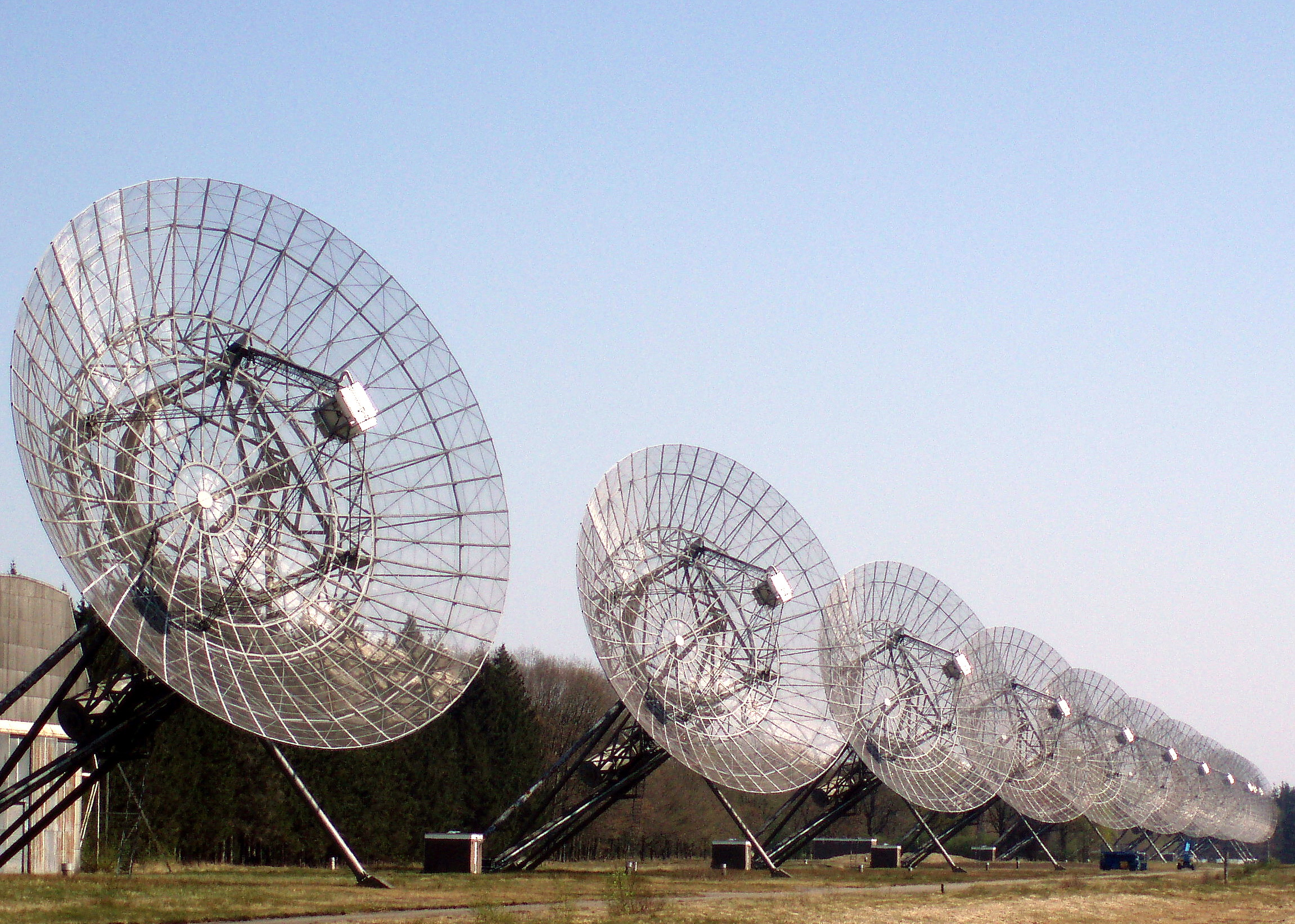
Westerbork Synthese Radio Telescoop

The village of Westerbork gives its name to the Westerbork deportation and (later) concentration camp, located about 7 km north of the village, in the forests of Hooghalen.

The Westerbork Synthesis Radio Telescope (WSRT) array was installed near the site of the camp in 1969.

== Education ==
There are 16 primary schools in the municipality as of 2023.

There are two secondary schools, both in Beilen:

- Dr. Nassau College
- CS Vincent van Gogh

== Notable people ==
- Carry van Bruggen (1881 in Smilde - 1932) a Dutch writer
- Jacob Israël de Haan (1881 in Smilde – 1924 in Jerusalem) a Dutch-Jewish literary writer, jurist and journalist, killed by Haganah
- Jan Hartman (1887 in Beilen – 1969) a Dutch fascist and collaborator during WWII
- Hendrikje van Andel-Schipper (1890 in Smilde – 2005 in Hoogeveen) the oldest person ever from the Netherlands
- Hans Heyting (1918 near Beilen – 1992) a Dutch poet, playwright, radio personality, children's book writer and painter
- Henk Koning (1933 in Beilen – 2016) a Dutch politician
- Martin van Hees (born 1964 in Beilen) a Dutch philosopher and academic
- Eef van Breen (born 1978 in Westerbork) a Dutch jazz trumpeter, singer, arranger and composer

=== Sport ===
- Jan Lomulder (born 1967 in Beilen) a Dutch former kickboxer
- Adelinde Cornelissen (born 1979 in Beilen) a Dutch dressage rider
- Jasper Iwema (born 1989 in Hooghalen) a Dutch motorcycle rider
- Laura Dijkema (born 1990 in Beilen) a Dutch volleyball player
