= Oranje, Netherlands =

Oranje
- Village
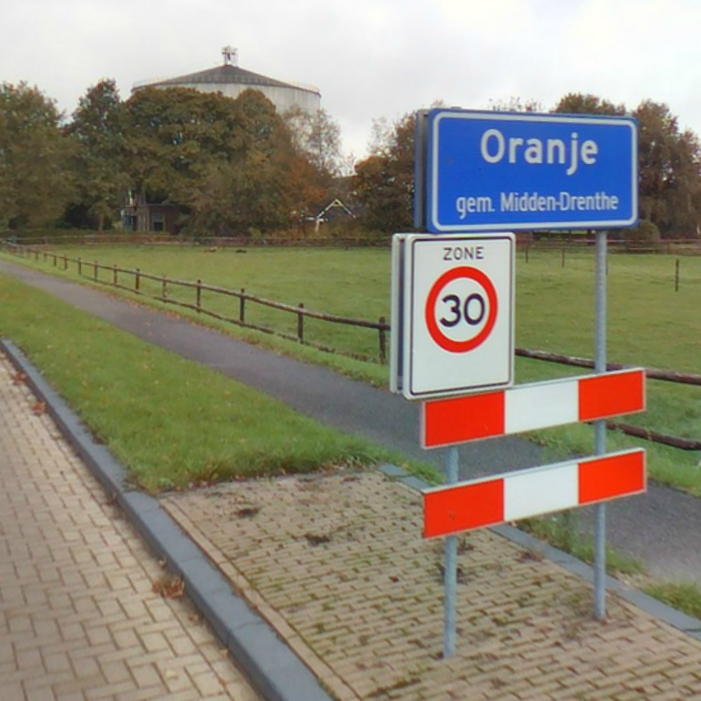

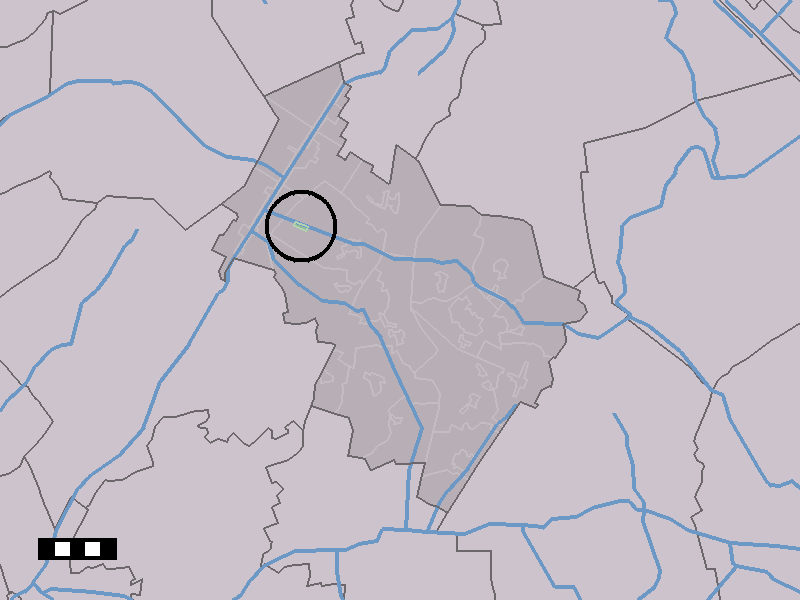
- Oranje in the municipality of Midden-Drenthe.

- Location in the Netherlands Oranje (Netherlands)
- Coordinates: 52°54′N 6°27′E
- Country: Netherlands
- Province: Drenthe
- Municipality: Midden-Drenthe

Area
  - Total: 0.24 km^{2} (0.093 sq mi)
- Elevation: 15 m (49 ft)

Population (2021)
  - Total: 110
  - Density: 460/km^{2} (1,200/sq mi)
- Time zone: UTC+1 (CET)
  - Summer (DST): UTC+2 (CEST)
- Postal code: 9416
- Dialing code: 0592

Oranje is a village in the Dutch province of Drenthe. It is a part of the municipality of Midden-Drenthe, and lies about 13 km southwest of Assen.

== History ==
The village was first mentioned in 1936 as Oranje, and refers to the Oranjekanaal which was dug in 1854. In 1913, the potato starch factory of Avebe was built, and a little village was created to house the work force. The factory closed in 1980 and was reused as an indoor playground for children, however it closed in 2015.

After an initial grudging agreement from the inhabitants to house 700 refugees in a holiday park in their village, on 6 October 2015 the government unilaterally increased this number to 1,400 to be accommodated immediately. This resulted in outrage and short term blockades of the village by the inhabitants. The refugees camp was cancelled in 2017.

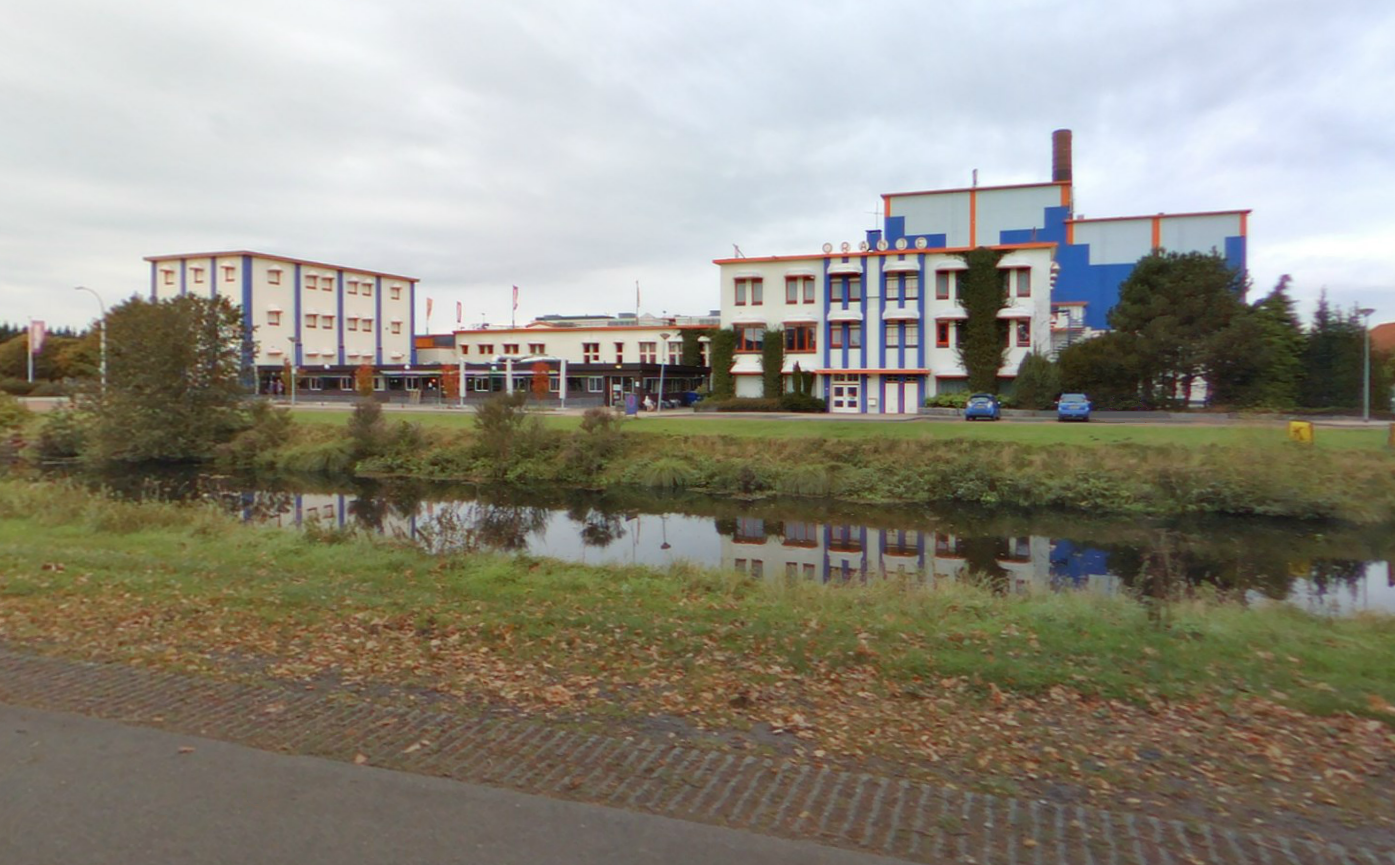
Indoor playground in the former factory
