= Zuidveld =

- Hamlet
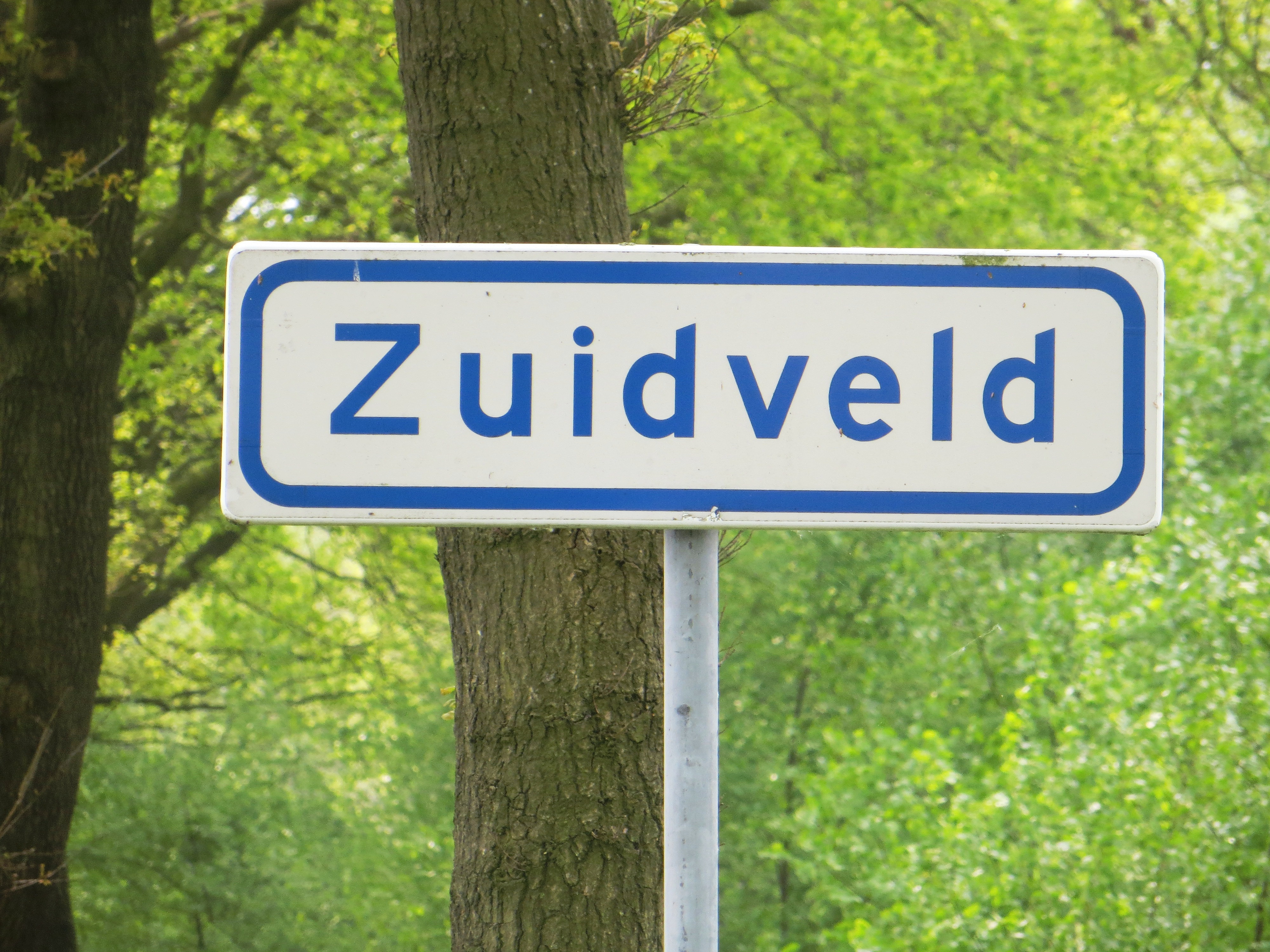
- Zuidveld place name sign

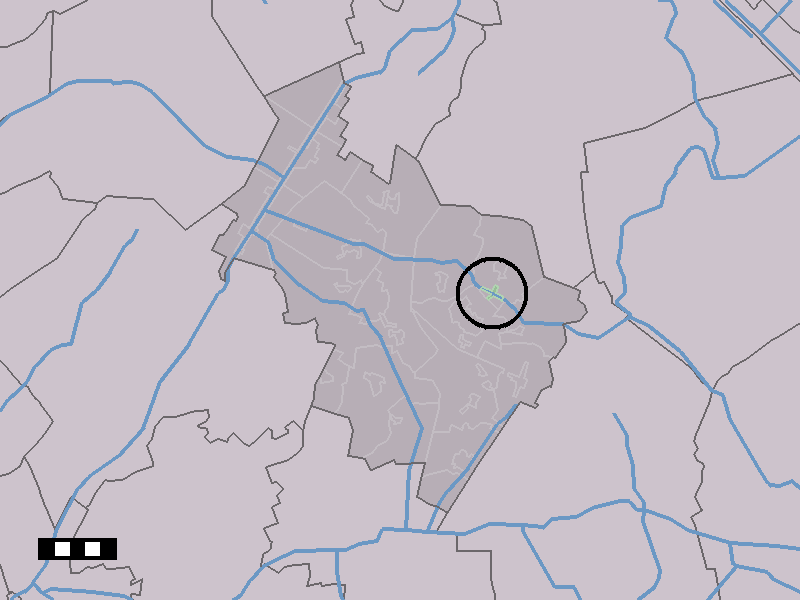
- Zuidveld in the municipality of Midden-Drenthe.

- Location in the Netherlands Zuidveld (Netherlands)
- Coordinates: 52°51′57″N 6°38′7″E
- Country: Netherlands
- Province: Drenthe
- Municipality: Midden-Drenthe

Population (1 January 2005)
  - Total: 80
- Time zone: UTC+1 (CET)
  - Summer (DST): UTC+2 (CEST)
- Postal code: 9432
- Dialing code: 0593

Zuidveld is a hamlet in the Dutch province of Drenthe. It is a part of the municipality of Midden-Drenthe, and lies about 16 km south of Assen.

The statistical area "Zuidveld", which can also include the surrounding countryside, has a population of around 80.
