= Witteveen, Midden-Drenthe =

Witteveen
- Village
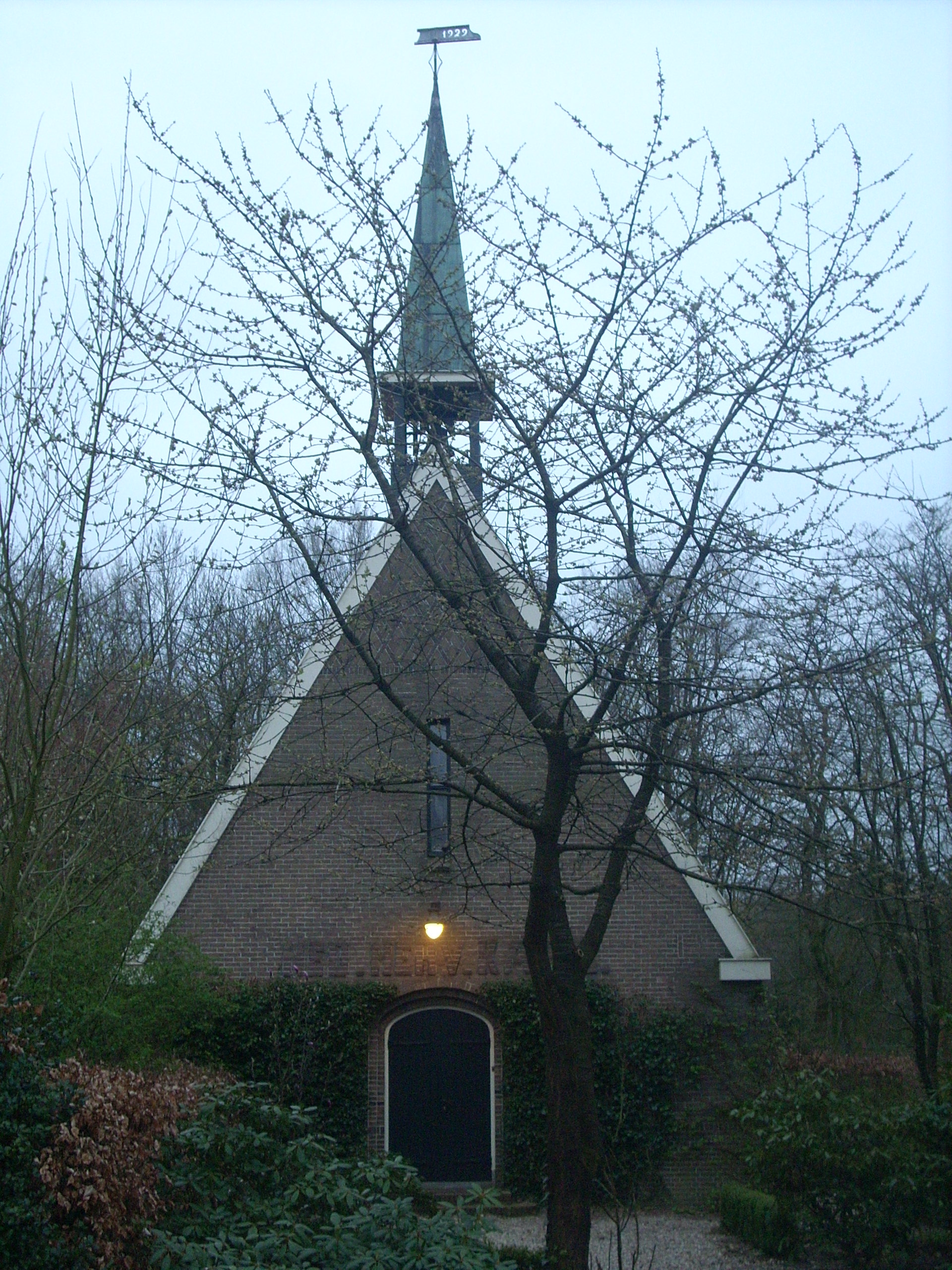
- Former chapel of Witteveen

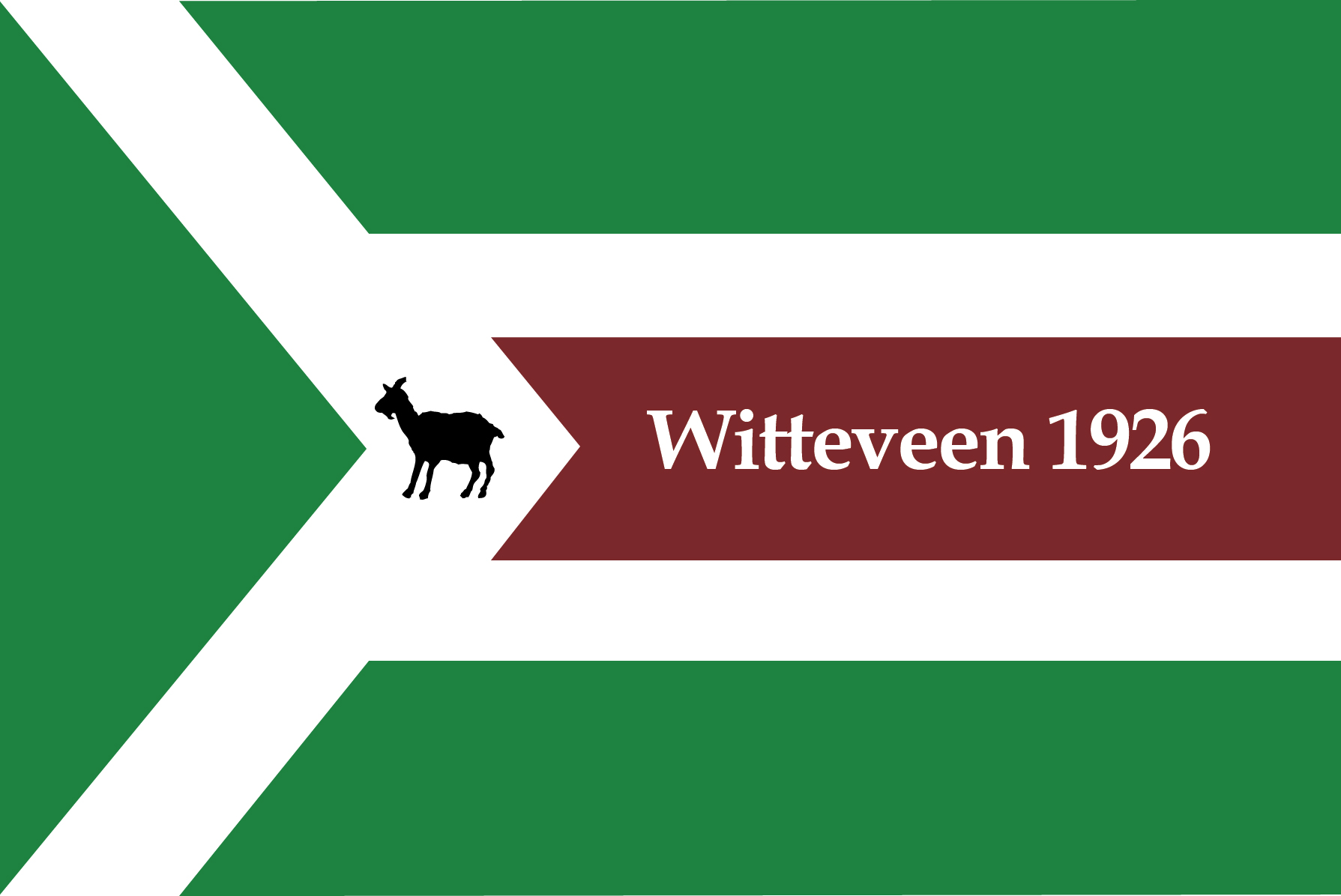
- Flag

- Location in the province of Drenthe in the Netherlands Witteveen (Netherlands)
- Coordinates: 52°48′51″N 6°39′36″E
- Country: Netherlands
- Province: Drenthe
- Municipality: Midden-Drenthe
- Established: 1926

Area
  - Total: 15.72 km^{2} (6.07 sq mi)
- Elevation: 17 m (56 ft)

Population (2021)
  - Total: 555
  - Density: 35.3/km^{2} (91.4/sq mi)
- Time zone: UTC+1 (CET)
  - Summer (DST): UTC+2 (CEST)
- Postal code: 9439
- Dialing code: 0593

Witteveen (Dutch pronunciation: [ˈʋɪtəˌveːn]; English: White Bog) is a village in the Dutch province of Drenthe. It is a part of the municipality of Midden-Drenthe, and lies about 16 km northeast of Hoogeveen.

The village was first mentioned in 1856 as "het Witteveen", and means "white peat". In 1926, the peat was excavated as part of a project for the unemployed. 50 houses were built to house the workers. In 1929, a small Dutch Reformed church was built. The church is nowadays used as a residential home.

== Gallery ==
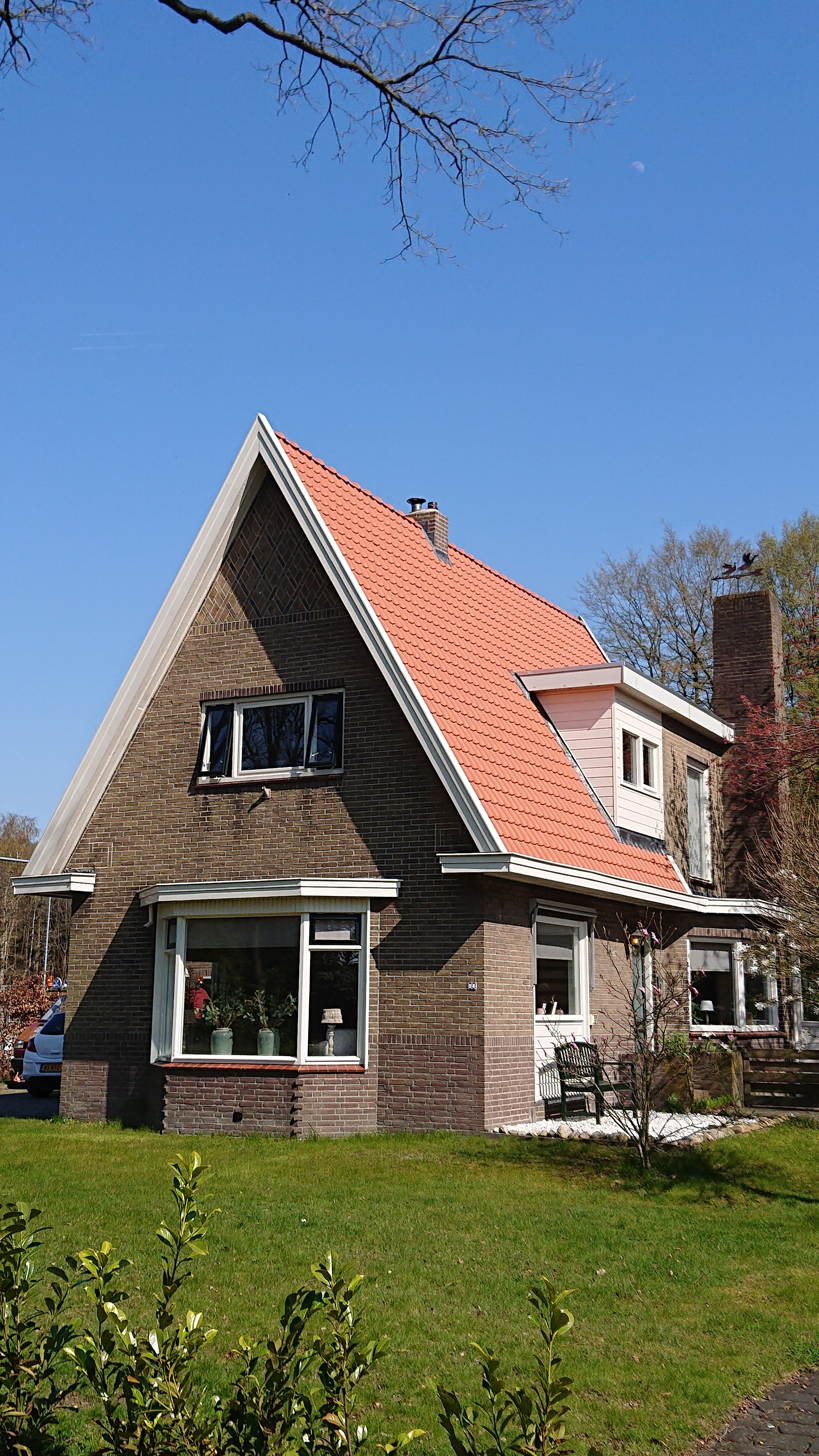
Former clergy house

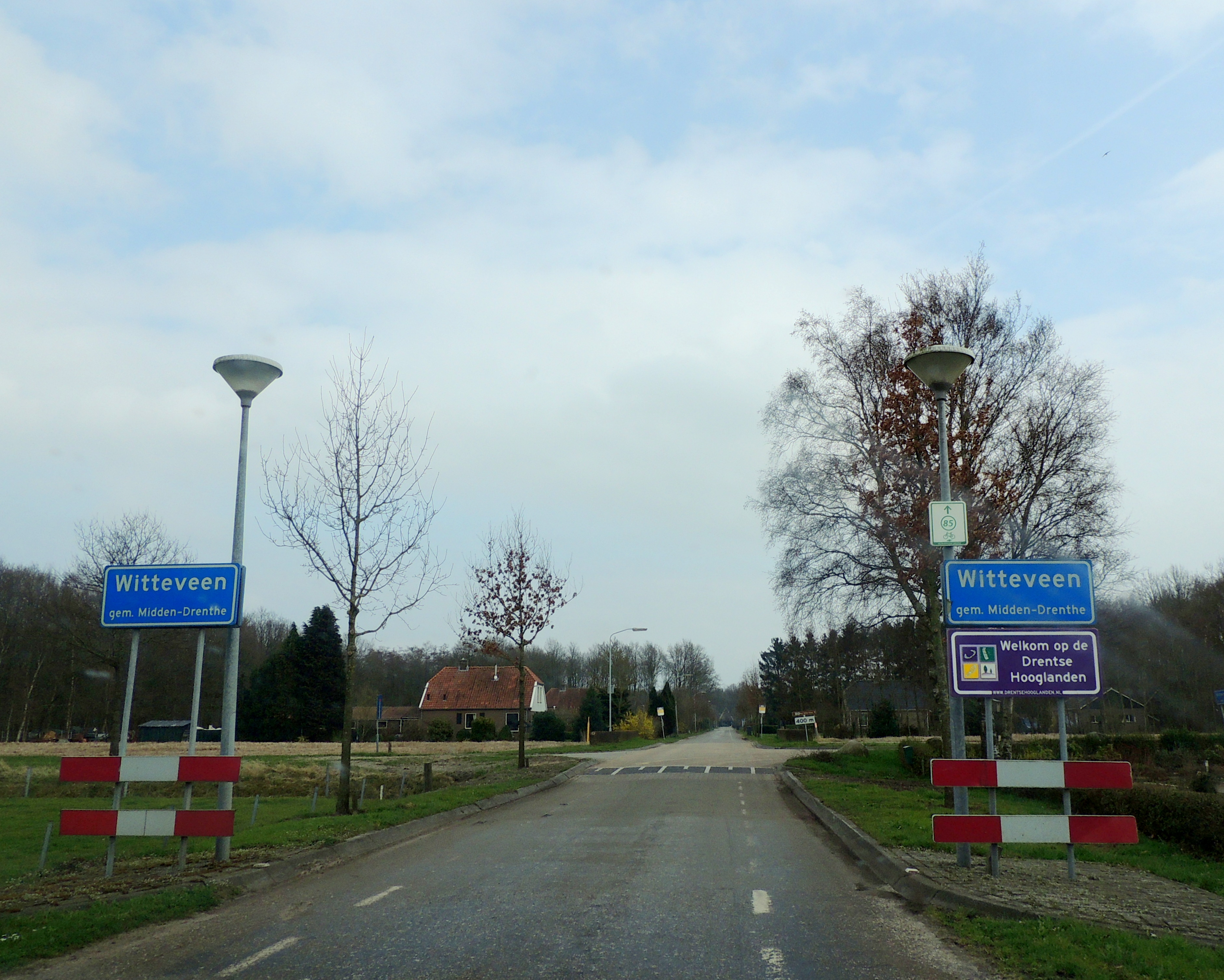
Welcome to Witteveen
