= Garminge =

- Village
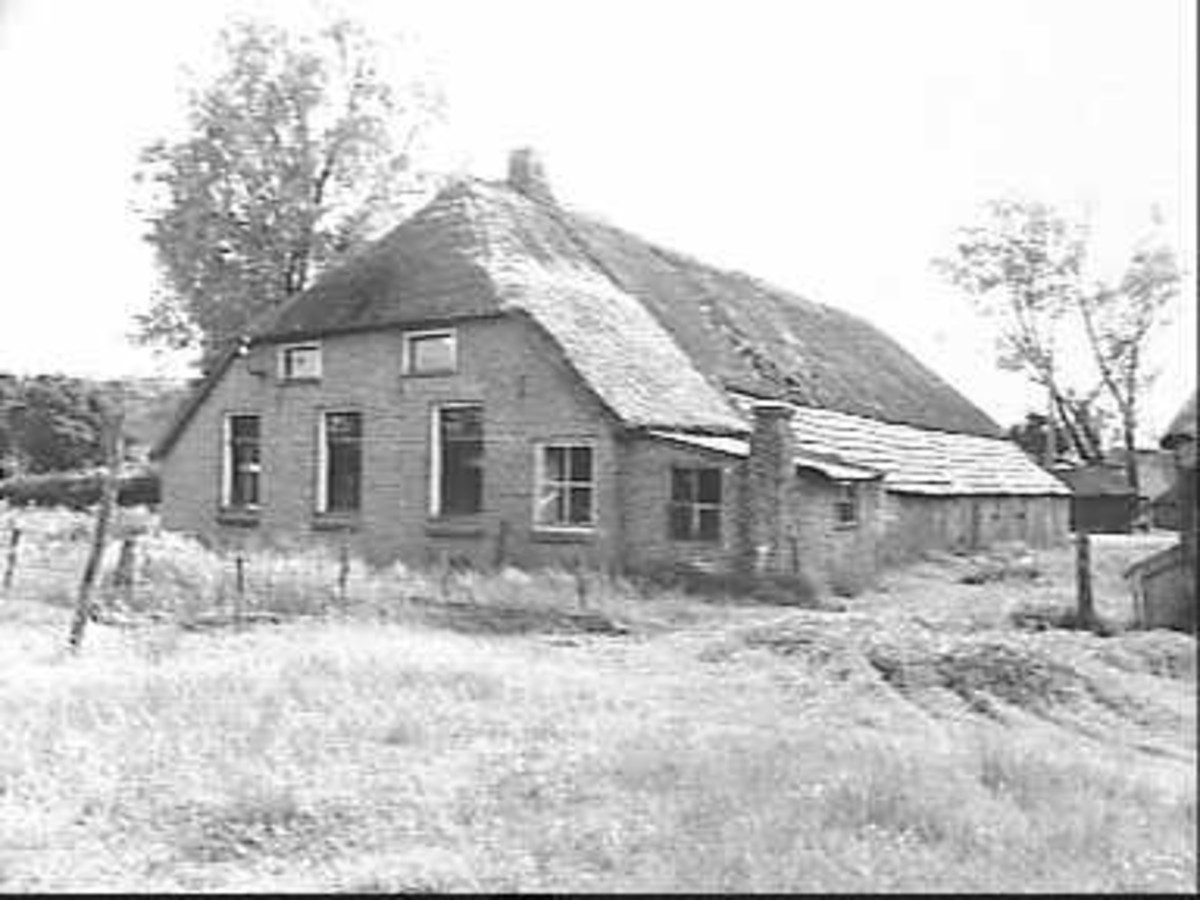
- Farm in Garminge

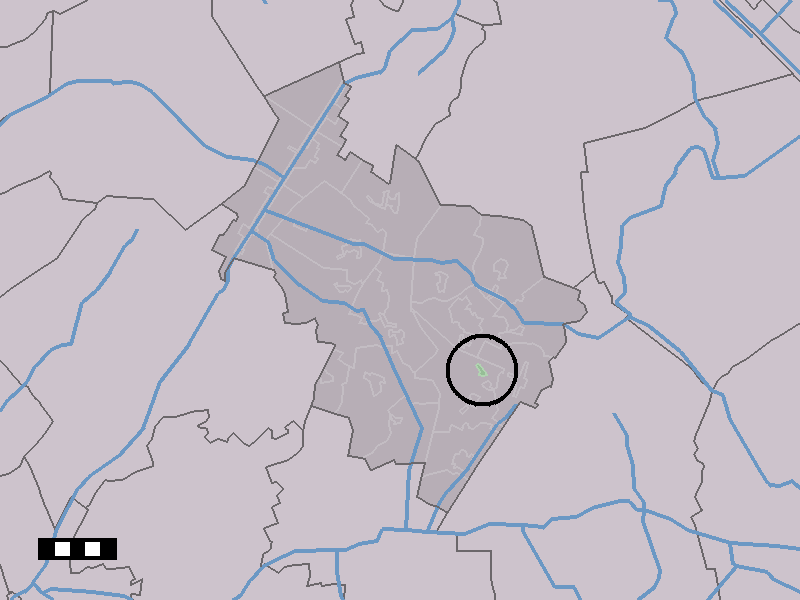
- Garminge in the municipality of Midden-Drenthe.

- Location in the Netherlands Garminge (Netherlands)
- Coordinates: 52°49′13″N 6°37′24″E
- Country: Netherlands
- Province: Drenthe
- Municipality: Midden-Drenthe

Area
  - Total: 0.25 km^{2} (0.097 sq mi)
- Elevation: 16 m (52 ft)

Population (2021)
  - Total: 105
  - Density: 420/km^{2} (1,100/sq mi)
- Time zone: UTC+1 (CET)
  - Summer (DST): UTC+2 (CEST)
- Postal code: 9438
- Dialing code: 0593

Garminge is a village in the Dutch province of Drenthe. It is a part of the municipality of Midden-Drenthe and is located approximately 15 km northeast of Hoogeveen.

It was first mentioned in 1362 as Gharminge, and means "the descendants of Garm". Garm is an old Dutch first name generally just used in the northern provinces Drenthe, Groningen and Friesland.

Garminge was home to 97 people in 1840.
