= Brunsting =

- Hamlet
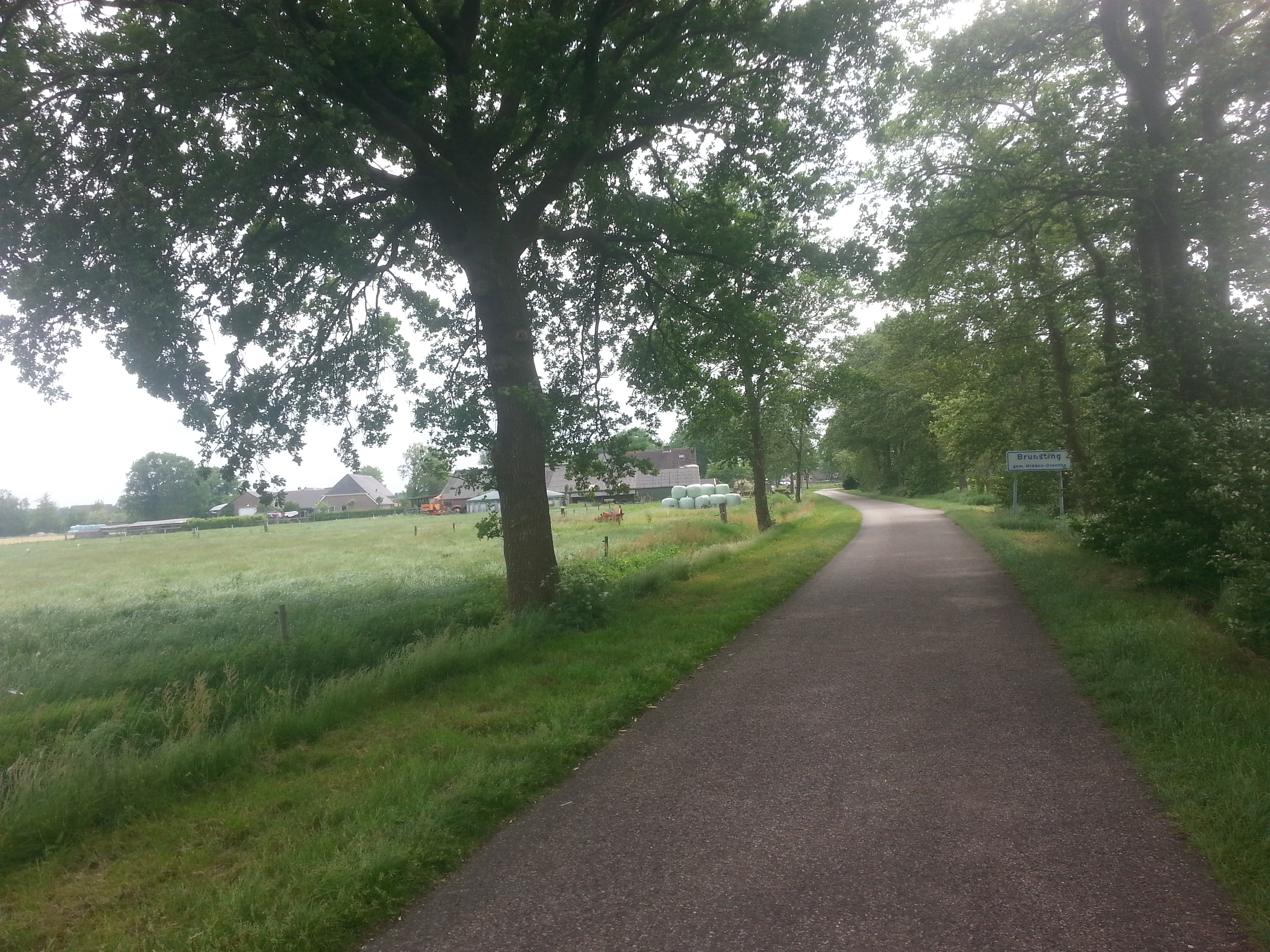

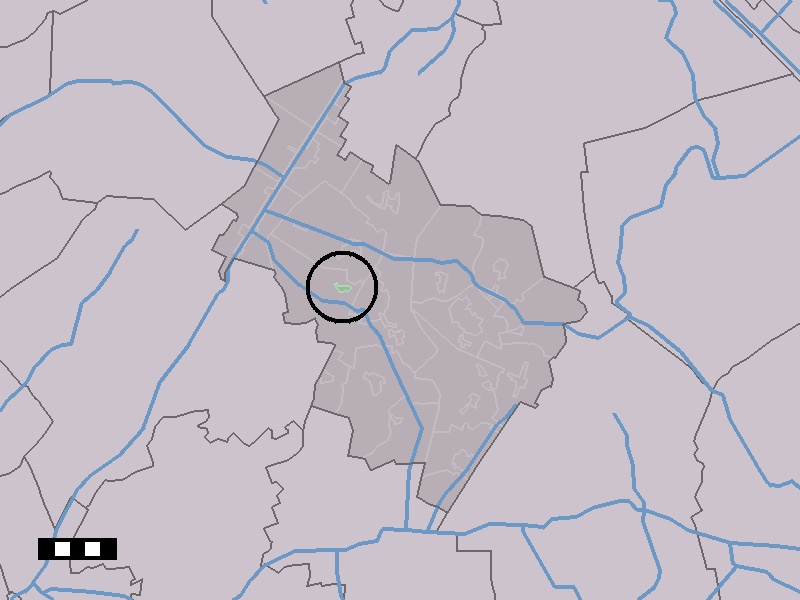
- Brunsting in the municipality of Midden-Drenthe.

- Location in the Netherlands Brunsting (Netherlands)
- Coordinates: 52°52′16″N 6°29′28″E
- Country: Netherlands
- Province: Drenthe
- Municipality: Midden-Drenthe

Population (1 January 2004)
  - Total: 100
- Time zone: UTC+1 (CET)
  - Summer (DST): UTC+2 (CEST)

Brunsting is a hamlet in the Dutch province of Drenthe. It is a part of the municipality of Midden-Drenthe, and lies about 16 km south of Assen.

The statistical area "Brunsting", which can also include the surrounding countryside, has a population of around 100.
