= Drijber =

- Village
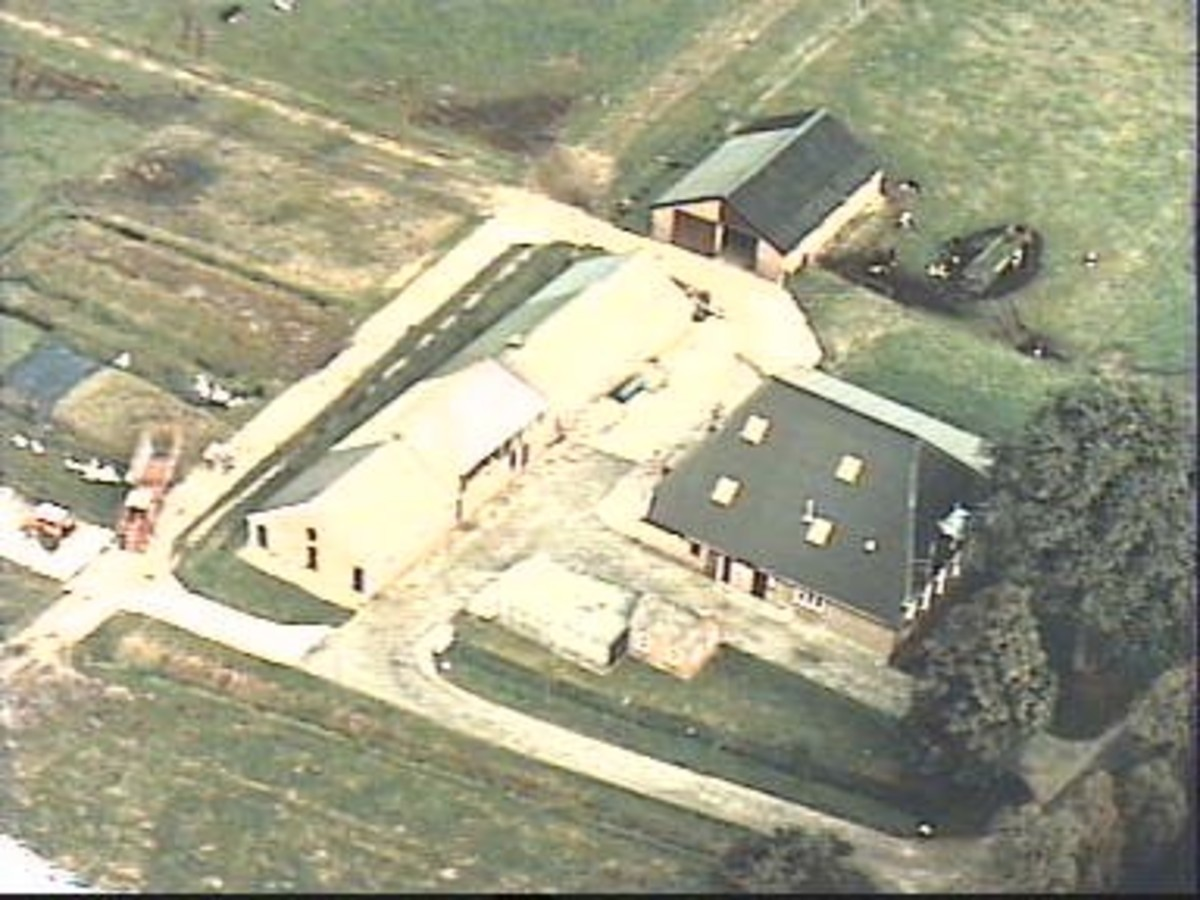
- Farm in Drijber

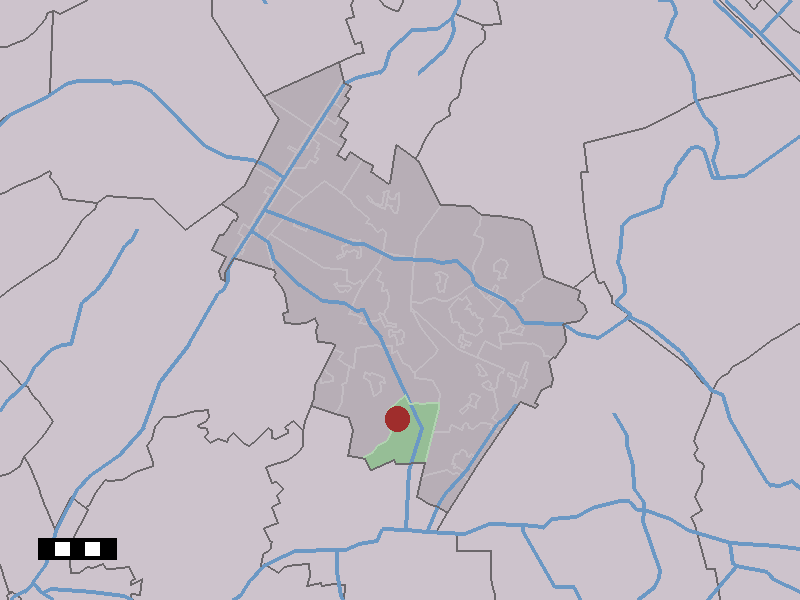
- The village (dark red) and the statistical district (light green) of Drijber in the municipality of Midden-Drenthe.

- Location in the Netherlands Drijber (Netherlands)
- Coordinates: 52°47′30″N 6°32′14″E
- Country: Netherlands
- Province: Drenthe
- Municipality: Midden-Drenthe

Area
  - Total: 13.48 km^{2} (5.20 sq mi)
- Elevation: 15 m (49 ft)

Population (2021)
  - Total: 475
  - Density: 35.2/km^{2} (91.3/sq mi)
- Time zone: UTC+1 (CET)
  - Summer (DST): UTC+2 (CEST)
- Postal code: 9419
- Dialing code: 0593

Drijber is a village in the Dutch province of Drenthe. It is a part of the municipality of Midden-Drenthe, and lies about 9 km north of Hoogeveen.

The village was first mentioned in 1217 as Triburd, and means "three neighbourhoods". The area around Drijber was first settled around 300 BC, however it was abandoned around 425.

Drijber was home to 68 people in 1840. In 1928, a little church was built in the village.
