= Holthe =

- Hamlet
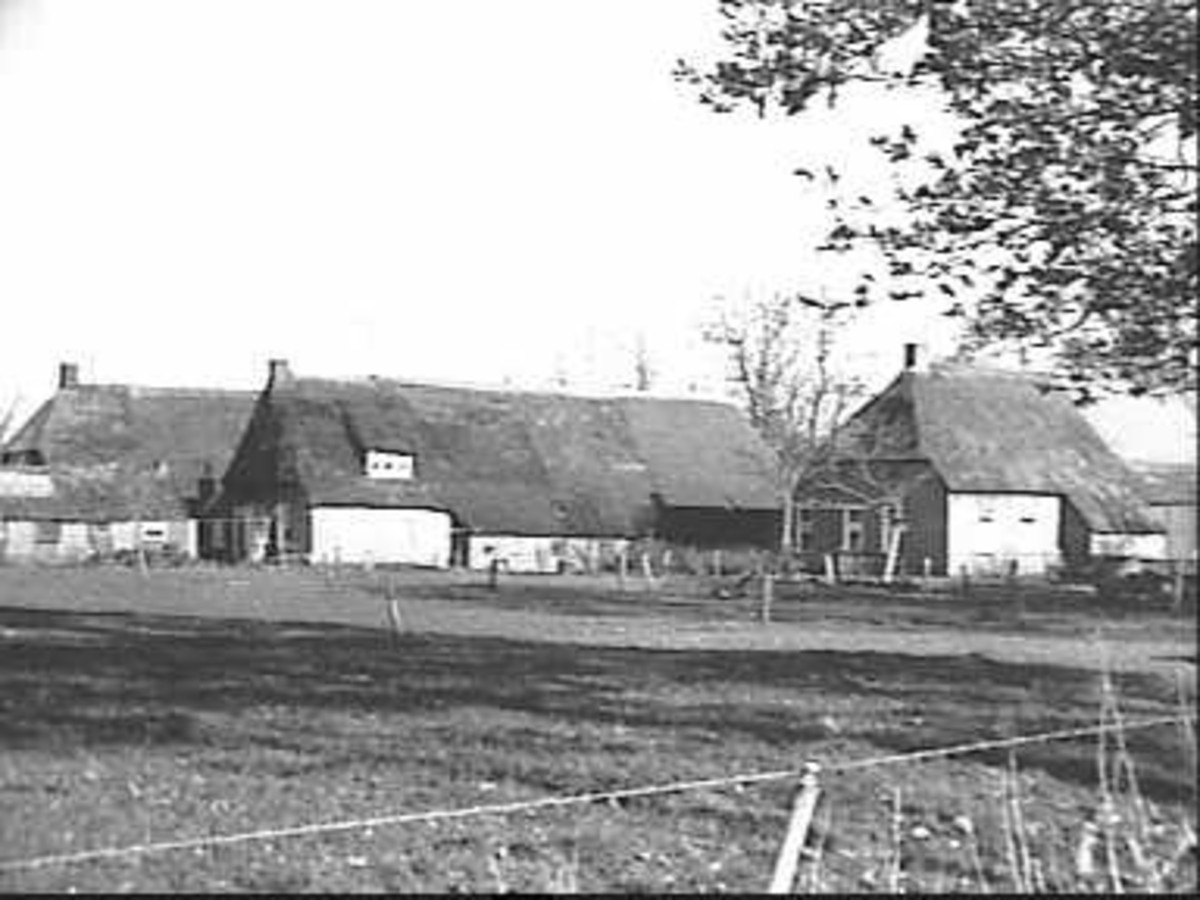
- Farms in Holthe

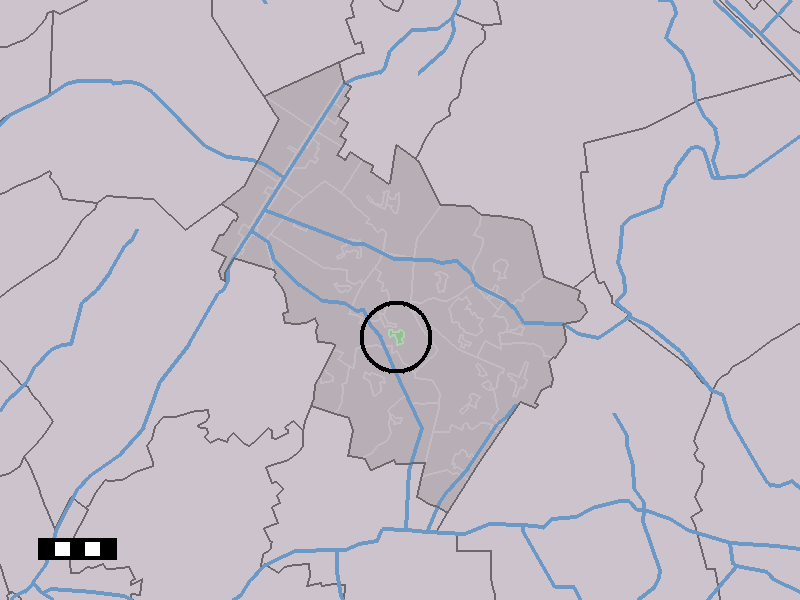
- Holthe in the municipality of Midden-Drenthe.

- Location in the Netherlands Holthe (Netherlands)
- Coordinates: 52°50′27″N 6°32′31″E
- Country: Netherlands
- Province: Drenthe
- Municipality: Midden-Drenthe

Population (1 January 2004)
  - Total: 150
- Time zone: UTC+1 (CET)
  - Summer (DST): UTC+2 (CEST)

Holthe is a hamlet in the Dutch province of Drenthe. It is a part of the municipality of Midden-Drenthe, and lies about 14 km north of Hoogeveen.

The statistical area "Holthe", which can also include the surrounding countryside, has a population of around 150.
