= Hijken =

- Village
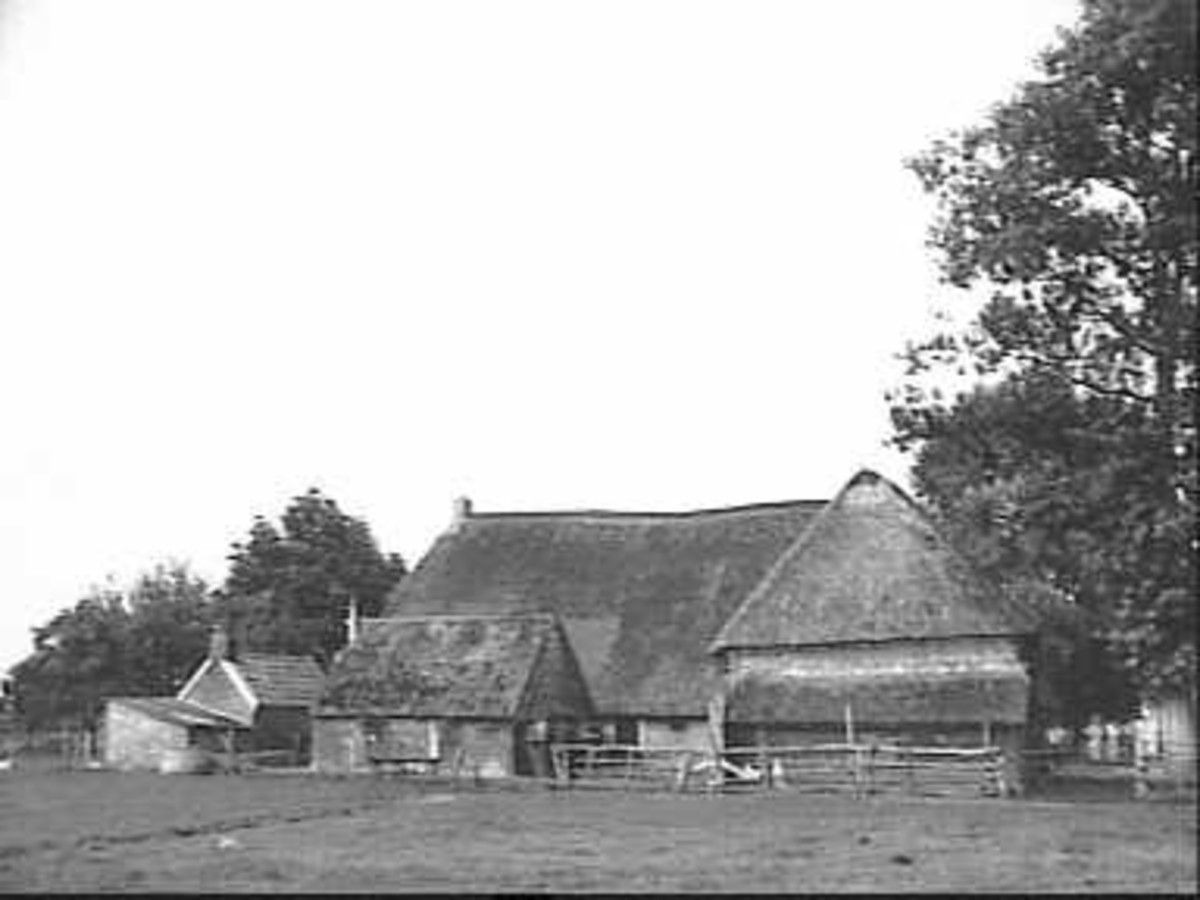
- A farm in Hijken

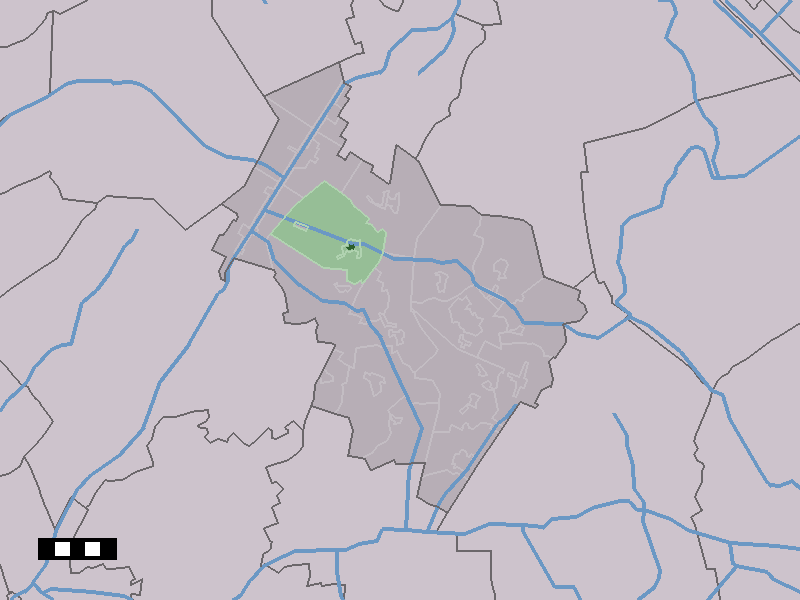
- The village centre (dark green) and the statistical district (light green) of Hijken in the municipality of Midden-Drenthe.

- Location in the Netherlands Hijken (Netherlands)
- Coordinates: 52.8956°N 6.4967°E
- Country: Netherlands
- Province: Drenthe
- Municipality: Midden-Drenthe

Area
  - Total: 28.12 km^{2} (10.86 sq mi)
- Elevation: 14 m (46 ft)

Population (2021)
  - Total: 930
  - Density: 33/km^{2} (86/sq mi)
- Time zone: UTC+1 (CET)
  - Summer (DST): UTC+2 (CEST)
- Postal code: 9415 & 9416
- Dialing code: 0593

Hijken is a village in the Dutch province of Drenthe. It is a part of the municipality of Midden-Drenthe, and lies about 13 km south of Assen, the province capital of Drenthe.

== History ==
The village was first mentioned in 1370 as "civibus de Hyken". The etymology is unknown. Hijken developed as an esdorp originally without a church in the Early Middle Ages as a satellite of Beilen. In 1858, the Oranjekanaal was dug which cut the village into two halves. It used be a village of shepherds. In 1563, there were 70 sheep for every building.

Hijken was home to 417 people in 1840. In 1906, a Reformed Church was built. In 1915, a steam dairy factory which doubled as grist mill was built. Between 1928 and 1960, it was used as a Dutch Reformed church and is nowadays used by a fodder and fertilizer company. In 2018, the municipality wanted to demolished the bridge over the canal, however protests have resulted in the construction of a new bridge in 2019.

The village is also known for its surrounding Neanderthal settlements. Late Neolithic Hat graves have been discovered dating to a Bronze Age settlement near Hijken.

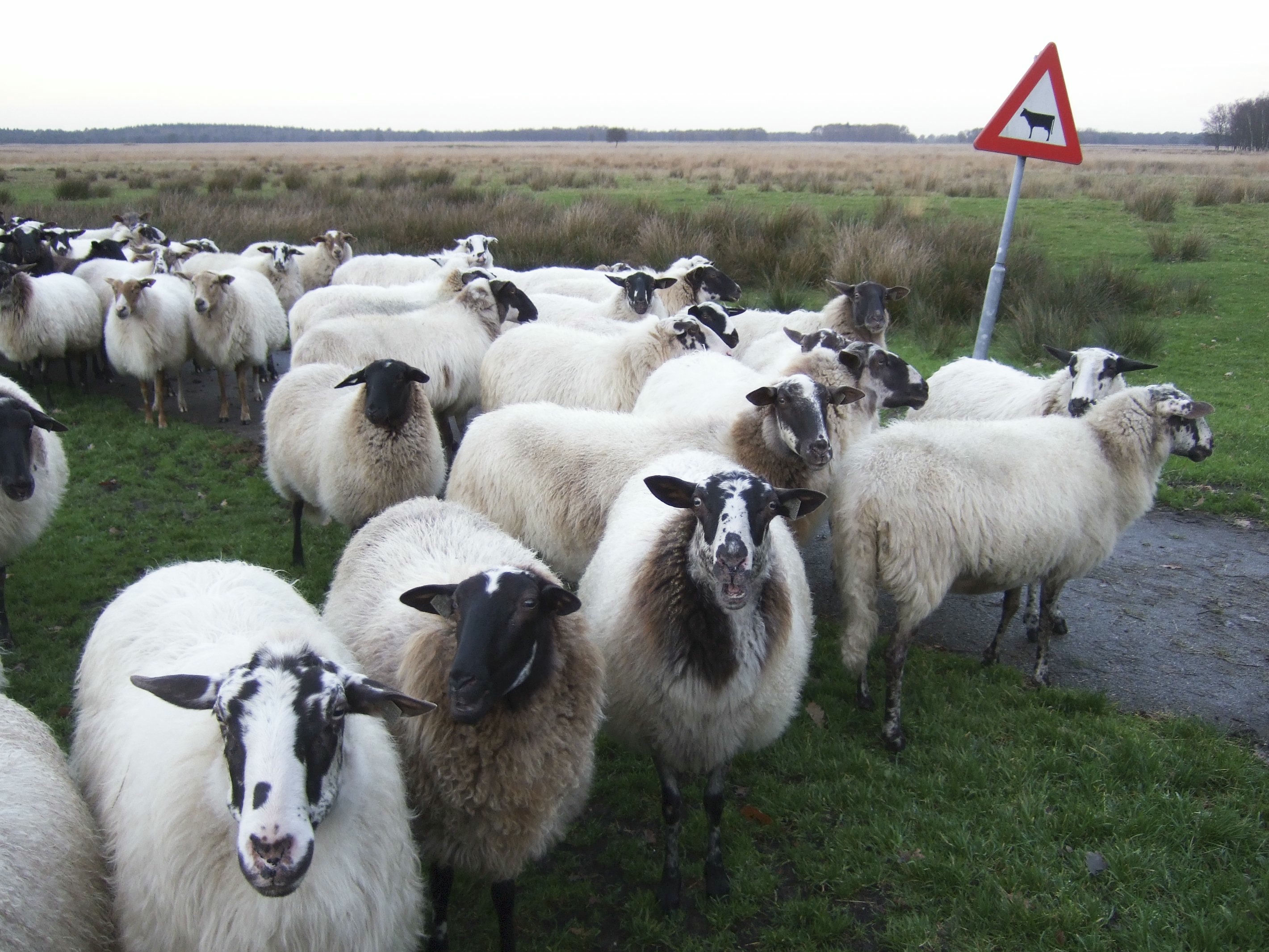
Sheep in Hijken on a street with appropriate warning sign

== Education ==
There is one primary school, ‘t Hieker Nust.
