= Bruntinge =

- Hamlet
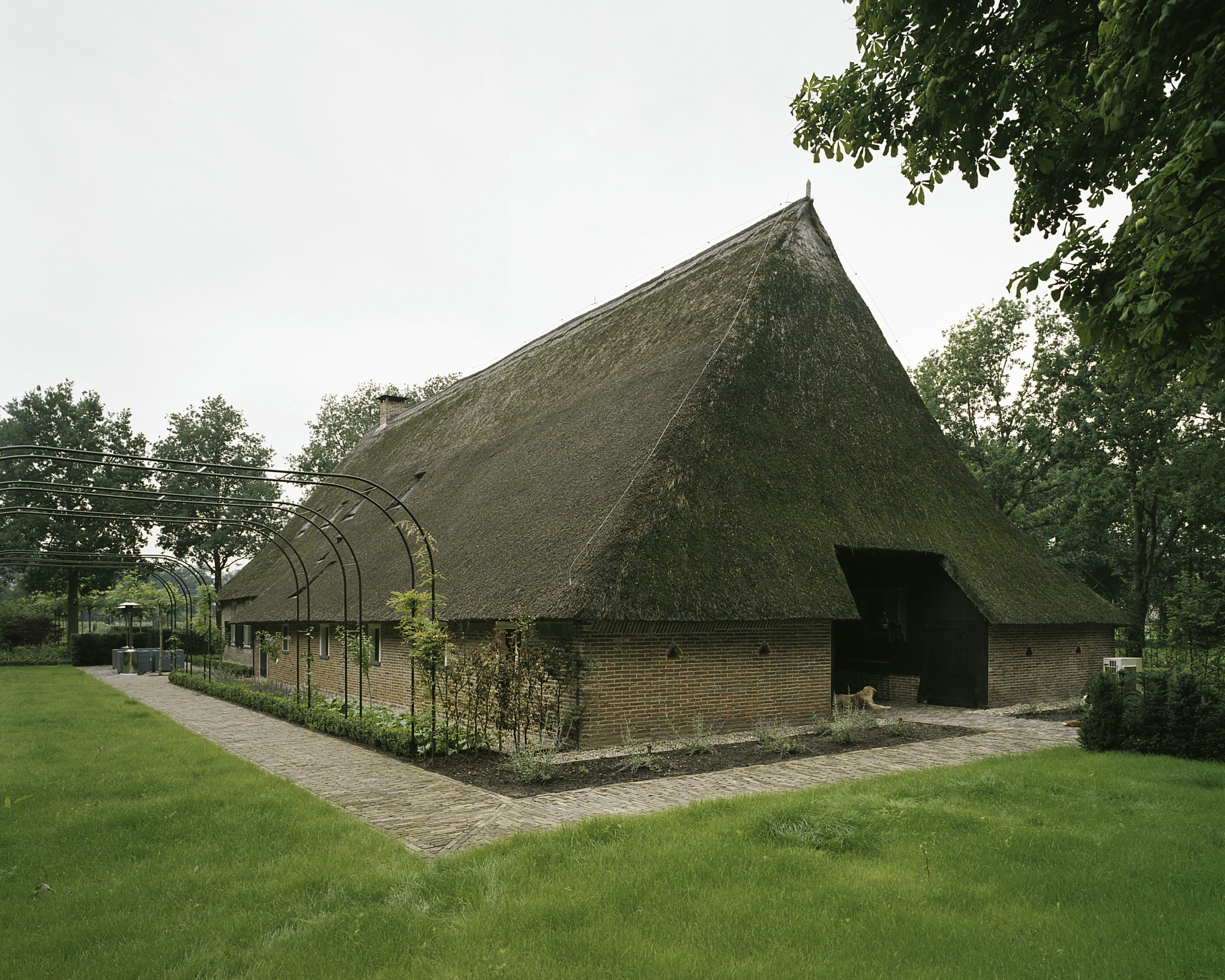
- Farm in Bruntinge

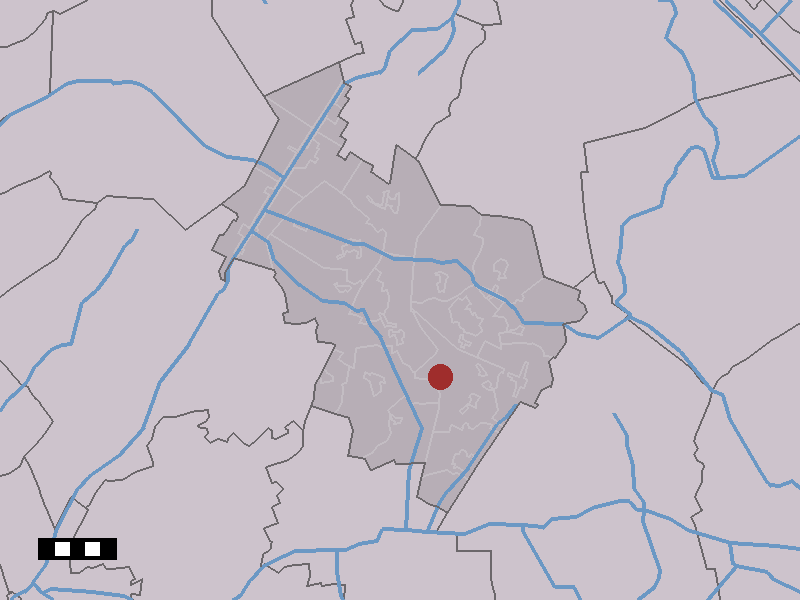
- Bruntinge in the municipality of Midden-Drenthe.

- Location in the Netherlands Bruntinge (Netherlands)
- Coordinates: 52°49′2″N 6°34′56″E
- Country: Netherlands
- Province: Drenthe
- Municipality: Midden-Drenthe
- Time zone: UTC+1 (CET)
  - Summer (DST): UTC+2 (CEST)
- Postal code: 9435
- Dialing code: 0593

Bruntinge is a hamlet in the Dutch province of Drenthe. It is a part of the municipality of Midden-Drenthe, and lies about 13 km northeast of Hoogeveen.
