= Eursinge, Midden-Drenthe =

Eursinge
- Hamlet
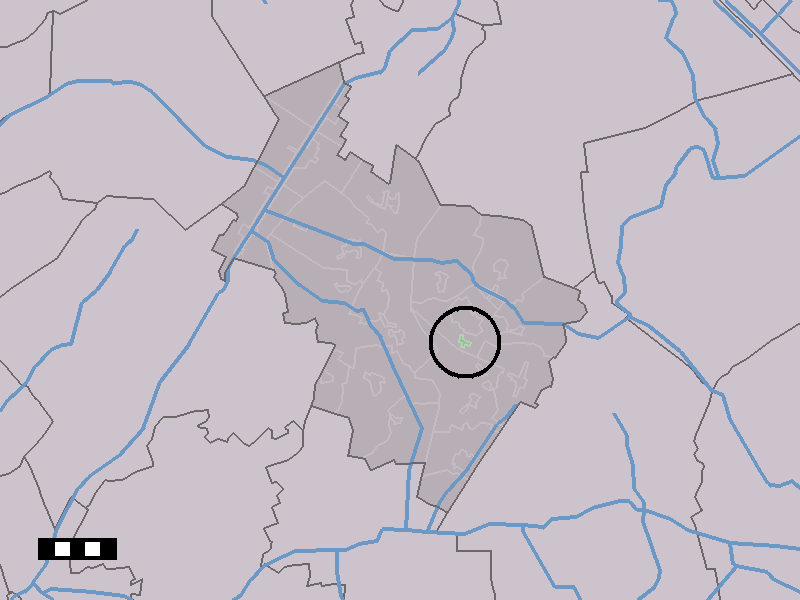
- Eursinge in the municipality of Midden-Drenthe.

- Location in the Netherlands Eursinge (Netherlands)
- Coordinates: 52°50′17″N 6°36′12″E
- Country: Netherlands
- Province: Drenthe
- Municipality: Midden-Drenthe

Population (1 January 2004)
  - Total: 60
- Time zone: UTC+1 (CET)
  - Summer (DST): UTC+2 (CEST)
- Postal code: 9434
- Dialing code: 0593

Eursinge is a hamlet in the Dutch province of Drenthe. It is a part of the municipality of Midden-Drenthe and lies about 16 km northeast of Hoogeveen.

The statistical area "Eursinge", which can also include the surrounding countryside, has a population of around 60.
