= Balinge =

- Village
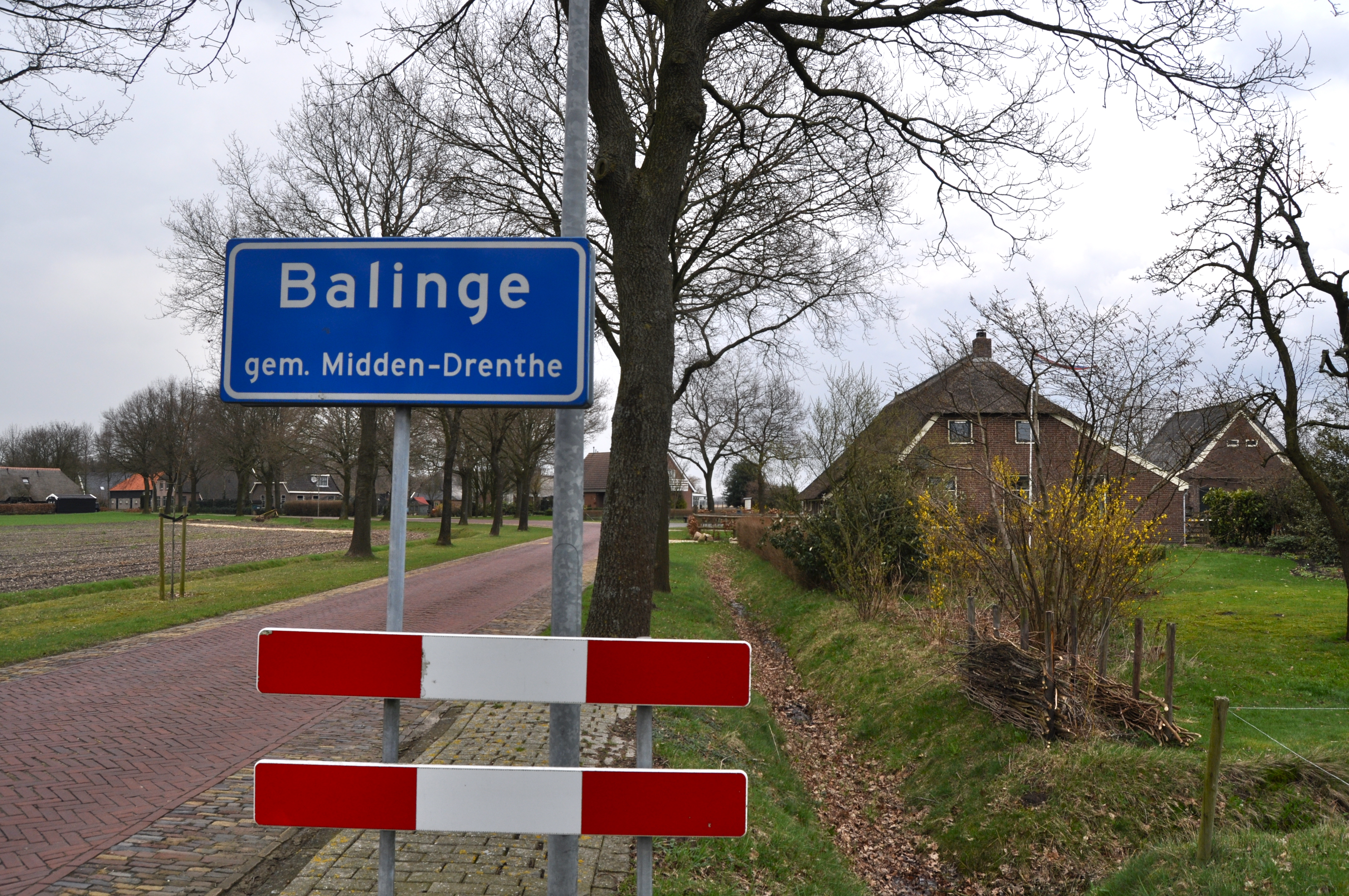

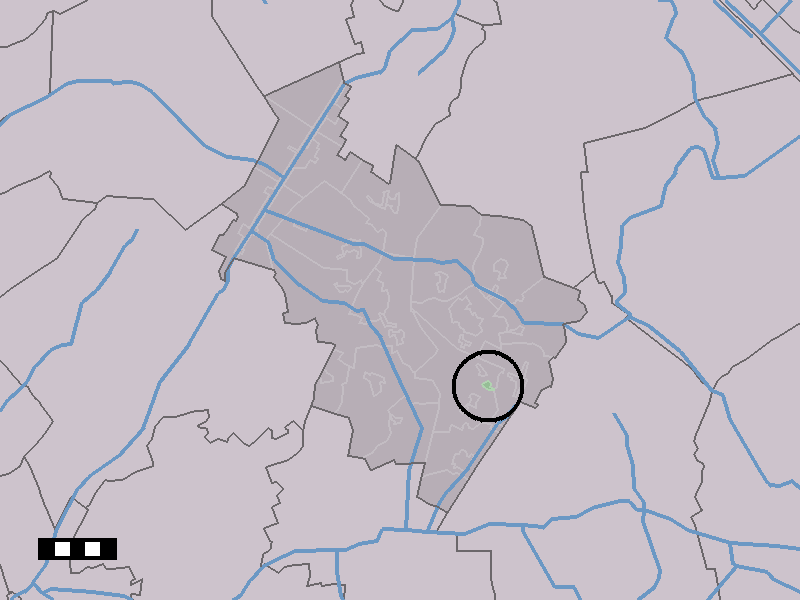
- Balinge in the municipality of Midden-Drenthe.

- Location in the Netherlands Balinge (Netherlands)
- Coordinates: 52°48′40″N 6°37′40″E
- Country: Netherlands
- Province: Drenthe
- Municipality: Midden-Drenthe

Area
  - Total: 0.23 km^{2} (0.089 sq mi)
- Elevation: 17 m (56 ft)

Population (2021)
  - Total: 100
  - Density: 430/km^{2} (1,100/sq mi)
- Time zone: UTC+1 (CET)
  - Summer (DST): UTC+2 (CEST)
- Postal code: 9437
- Dialing code: 0593

Balinge is a village in the Dutch province of Drenthe. It is a part of the municipality of Midden-Drenthe, and lies about 14 km northeast of Hoogeveen.

The village was first mentioned between 1381 and 1383 as Balinghe, and means "settlement of the people of Balo (person)".

Balinge was home to 59 people in 1840.

== Education ==
There is a primary school in Balinge, De Wenteling.
