= Westerbork (village) =

- Village
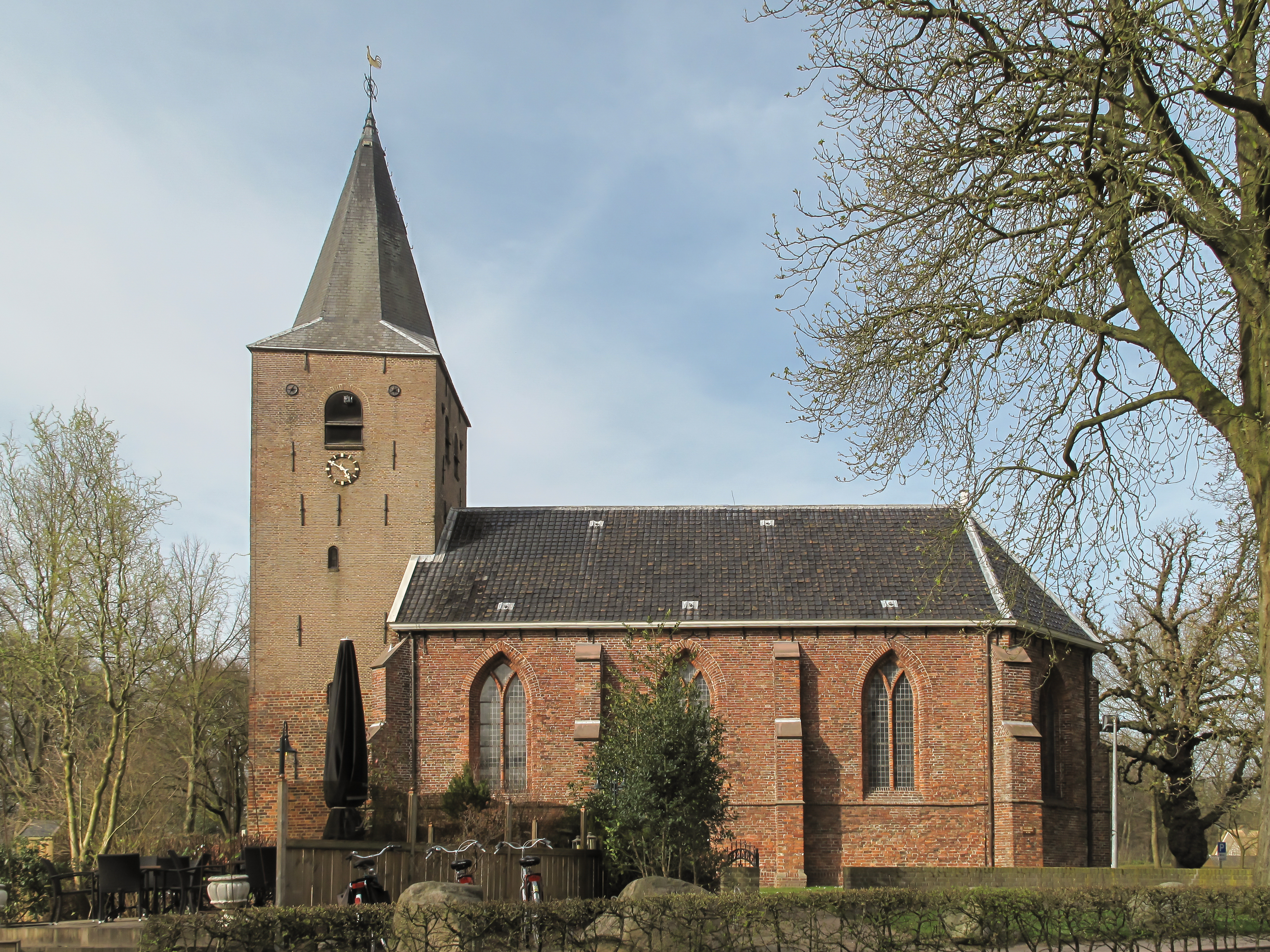
- Westerbork church in 2011

- Location in the province of Drenthe in the Netherlands Westerbork (Netherlands)
- Coordinates: 52°51′6″N 6°36′34″E
- Country: Netherlands
- Province: Drenthe
- Municipality: Midden-Drenthe

Area
  - Total: 16.26 km^{2} (6.28 sq mi)
- Elevation: 17 m (56 ft)

Population (2021)
  - Total: 4,705
  - Density: 289.4/km^{2} (749.4/sq mi)
- Time zone: UTC+1 (CET)
  - Summer (DST): UTC+2 (CEST)
- Postal code: 9431
- Dialing code: 0593

Westerbork (Dutch pronunciation: [ˈʋɛstərˌbɔr(ə)k]) is a village in the municipality of Midden-Drenthe in the Netherlands. It is located in the middle of the eastern province of Drenthe. During World War II, the Westerbork transit camp was located near the village. The Westerbork Synthesis Radio Telescope and the Camp Westerbork Museum are now situated at the site.

== History ==
The village was first mentioned in 1206 as Burch. It is unclear whether it is "western castle" or "western forest (of birch trees)". Westerbork is an esdorp from the Early Middle Ages which developed on higher ground. The 12th century chapel was elevated to church in 1240, and it became an independent parish. Westerbork contained four essen (communal pastures).

The tower of the Dutch Reformed church dates from the 13th century and contains a bell from the 13th or 14th century. The gothic nave and choir are probably from the 15th century. The spire probably dates from 1884. Westerbork was home to 396 people in 1840.

In 1939, the refugee camp Westerbork was established outside of the village to accommodate German refugees who had fled Nazi Germany. A year later, Nazi Germany had occupied the Netherlands following the Battle of the Netherlands. In 1942, the refugee camp was turned into a transit camp and more than 100,000 Jews, Roma, and Sinti were deported via Westerbork to concentration and extermination camps in Nazi Germany and occupied Poland. Between 1945 and 1948, after the war had ended, the camp was used as internment camp for collaborators.

In 1969, the Westerbork Synthesis Radio Telescope was installed near the site of the former camp. The radio telescope consists of an array of 14 antennas with a diameter of 25 metres each and is operated by ASTRON.

In 1983, the Camp Westerbork Museum was opened at the former camp site. It focuses on the occupation of the Netherlands during World War II, the persecution of the Jews, and the history of the camp.

Westerbork was a separate municipality until 1998, when it became part of Middenveld, which was renamed Midden-Drenthe in 2000.

== Education ==
There is one primary school, De Lindelaar.
