= Any Other City =

Studio album by Life Without Buildings
- Released: 26 February 2001
- Genres: Indie rock; post-punk; art rock; math rock
- Length: 44:30
- Labels: Tugboat Records (UK), DC/Baltimore 2012 (US)
- Producer: Andy Miller

Life Without Buildings chronology
Any Other City (2001)	Live at the Annandale Hotel (2007)

Any Other City is the only studio album by Scottish indie rock band Life Without Buildings, released on 26 February 2001 in the United Kingdom and in 2002 in the United States.

== Reception ==
=== Critical response ===
Professional ratings
Review scores
Source	Rating
AllMusic	4.5/5 stars
Drowned in Sound	10/10
The Guardian	3/5 stars
NME	4/10
Paste	8.5/10
Pitchfork	7.0/10 (2001); 8.7/10 (2014)
PopMatters	9/10
Record Collector	4/5 stars

Matthew Willson of Drowned in Sound stated, "This album is a powerful reminder that the punk scene is still producing innovative and exciting new sounds." Drawing comparisons to bands such as The Slits and LiLiPUT, Andy Kellman of AllMusic commented, "These female-fronted groups have certainly inspired LWB, but this quartet -- simply a drummer, a bassist, a guitarist, and a vocalist -- offers much more than nostalgia and post-punk plundering. They're more of a pop band, which is just fine." Noel Murray of The A.V. Club noted the influences of Patti Smith and Sonic Youth, among others, stating that the songs "reduce the flavor and style of all of Life Without Buildings' influences—25 years of brainy girlpunk—and reproduce them on track after track," though he praised the group for their "great sound."

Sue Tompkins' unique vocal style was singled out in multiple reviews. While John Mulvey of NME compared Tompkins' voice to "the scrape of fingernails on a blackboard," opining that "only mad people and immediate family could warm to Tompkins," other critics were more receptive. Jenn Sikes of Splendid praised Tompkins' vocals, stating, "The chewed word-bits are like little metronomes, counting beats between her fully-formed words, which are spoken/sung in a cheery Scottish accent that's childlike but fierce." Kellman commented that "[h]er repet-pet-petitive repetitive style might be at odds with the ears of some listeners, but it's just as unique as the exuberant vocals" employed by Tompkins' influences.

=== Legacy and impact ===
Retrospectively, Any Other City has grown in reputation and influence. Tompkins' vocals have continued to attract acclaim, being called "the core around which the rest of the record revolves." Pitchfork's Lindsay Zoladz praised her "extraordinary sense of rhythm" and "carefully metered" delivery. Stereogum's Will Richards noted that through her rejecting the conventional uses of cadence and tone, she "[tore] apart the formulaic structure of a rock band", yielding "rarely seen and exhilarating" results. Zoladz saw the group's influence carry through into others including Los Campesinos!, Marnie Stern, Perfect Pussy, Ponytail, and more. She saw those bands bring Buildings' "sheer technical skill with a sense of ecstatic playfulness" into their own sensibilities.

Many artists have expressed admiration for City and cited its influence on them and their music, including Los Campesinos!, singer Paul Smith and his band Maxïmo Park, Julian Corrie, Ought, Cloud Nothings' Dylan Baldi, Helena Deland, Wishy, and The 1975's Matty Healy.

The album was re-released to rave reviews for Record Store Day on 19 April 2014 on the What's Your Rupture label. The vinyl issue included a 7" featuring alternate versions of "The Leanover" and "New Town".

=== Accolades ===
Critical rankings for Any Other City
Publication	Type	Year	Rank	Ref.
Pitchfork	Decade-end	2009	128	
Pitchfork	100 Best Indie Rock Albums of All-Time	2026	21	
Treble	All-time (One-album wonders)	2011	--	
Spectrum Culture	All-time (One-album wonders)	2012	--	
Rolling Stone	All-time (One-album wonders)	2021	21	
Rough Trade	All-time (One-album wonders)	2023	--	
"--" indicates an unordered list.

== Track listing ==
All tracks are written by Sue Tompkins, Robert Johnston, Chris Evans and Will Bradley.

No.	Title	Length
1.	"PS Exclusive"	4:16
2.	"Let's Get Out"	3:57
3.	"Juno"	5:07
4.	"The Leanover"	5:24
5.	"Young Offenders"	3:10
6.	"Philip"	2:29
7.	"Envoys"	4:08
8.	"14 Days"	3:11
9.	"New Town"	5:53
10.	"Sorrow"	6:55
Total length:		44:30

== Personnel ==
Life Without Buildings

- Sue Tompkins – vocals
- Robert Johnston – guitar
- Chris Evans – bass
- Will Bradley – drums

Additional personnel

- Andy Miller – production, engineering
