= De Ateliers =

Art school in Amsterdam, Netherlands

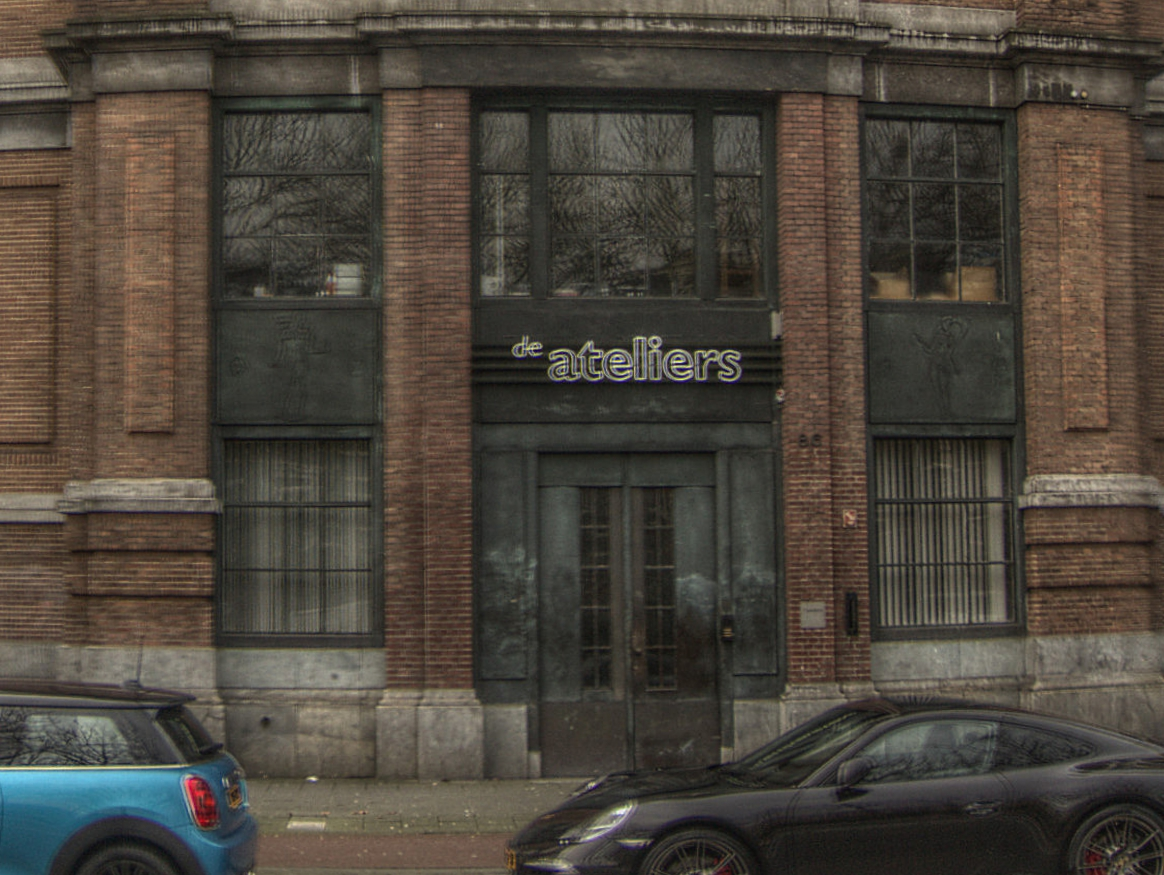
De Ateliers entrance, 2015

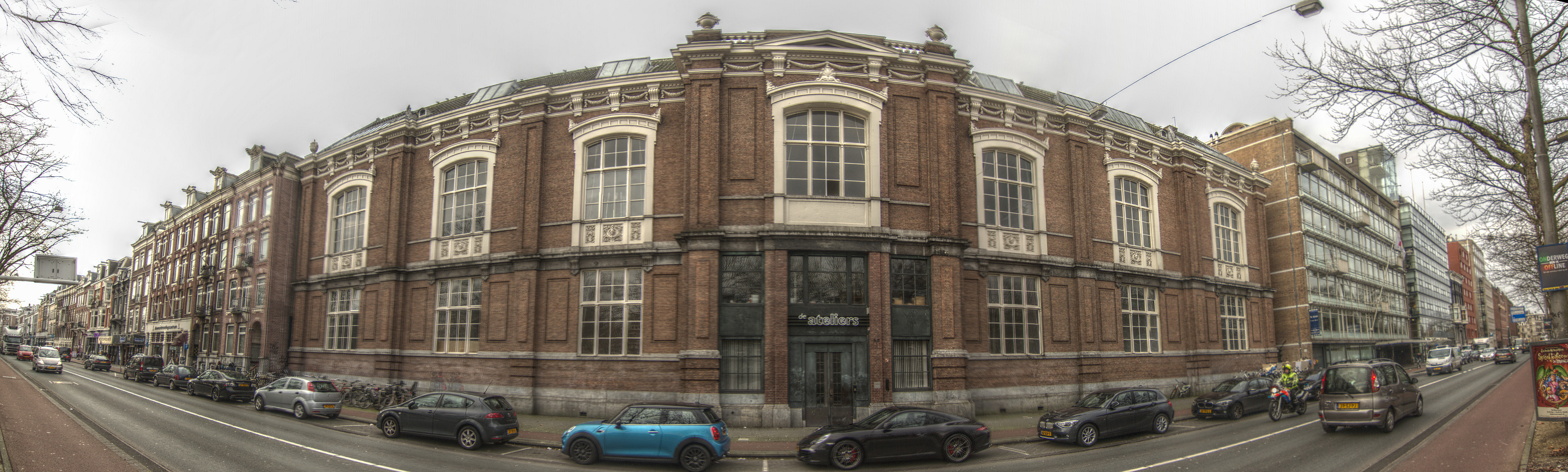
De Ateliers streetview, 2015

De Ateliers (formerly Ateliers '63) is an independent art school in located in Amsterdam. It was founded in Haarlem in 1963, among others by Ger Lataster, Mari Andriessen, Nic Jonk, Theo Mulder and Wessel Couzijn. This "group of artists has agreed that the formative process of fine artists should be more individually directed than the learning of a trade or the studying of a science."

De Ateliers offers a postgraduate program, where young artists can work in their own workshops with accompanied by renowned artists and critics. Students are called 'participants'. They are regularly visited in their studios by the tutors and guests from The Netherlands and abroad for individual feedbacks.

After many years located in Haarlem, the institute moved to Amsterdam to the former building of the Rijksakademie at the Stadhouderskade in the Amsterdam city center.

Among the accompanying have been: Armando, Stanley Brouwn, Constant Nieuwenhuys, Jan Dibbets, Didier Vermeiren, Edgar Fernhout, Carel Visser and Willem de Rooij.

Among the participants of De Ateliers have been: Philip Akkerman, Jaap Berghuis, Keren Cytter, Marlene Dumas, Thomas Houseago, Rob Johannesma, Andrew Kerton Axel en Helena van der Kraan, Joep van Lieshout, Marc Ruygrok and Anami Schrijvers.

The supervisors in 2020-'21 were:

- Lara Almarcegui
- Rob Birza
- Dominic van den Boogerd
- Varda Caivano
- Nina Canell
- Pauline Curnier Jardin
- Chris Evans
- Martijn Hendriks
- David Jablonowski
- Marina Pinsky
