= Carel Visser =

Dutch sculptor

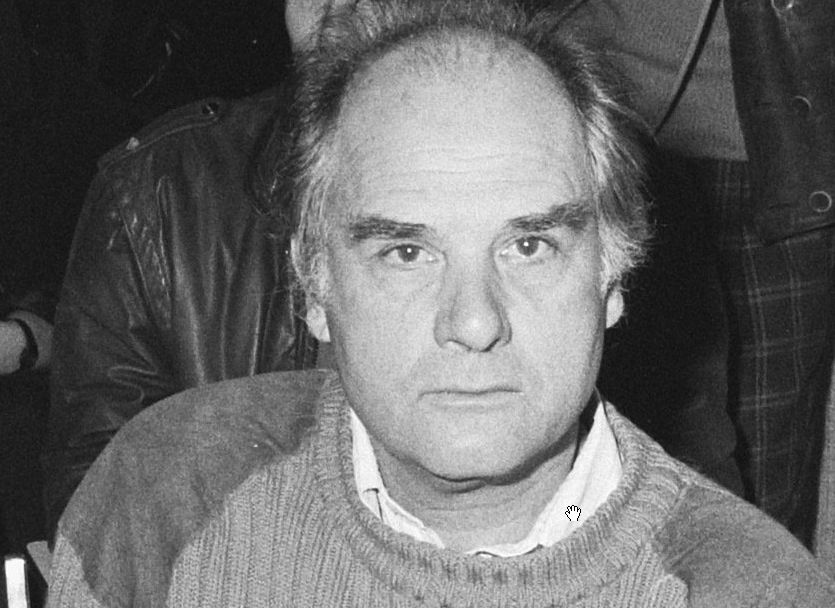
Carel Visser, 1986

Carel Nicolaas Visser (3 May 1928 – 1 March 2015) was a Dutch sculptor. He is considered an important representative of Dutch abstract-minimalist constructivism in sculpture.

== Life and work ==
Visser was born on 3 May 1928 in Papendrecht. From 1948 until 1949 Visser studied architecture at the Technical University in Delft and subsequently from 1949 until 1951 sculpture at the Royal Academy of Arts, The Hague. After study in England and France, he settled as an independent artist in 1952 in Amsterdam.

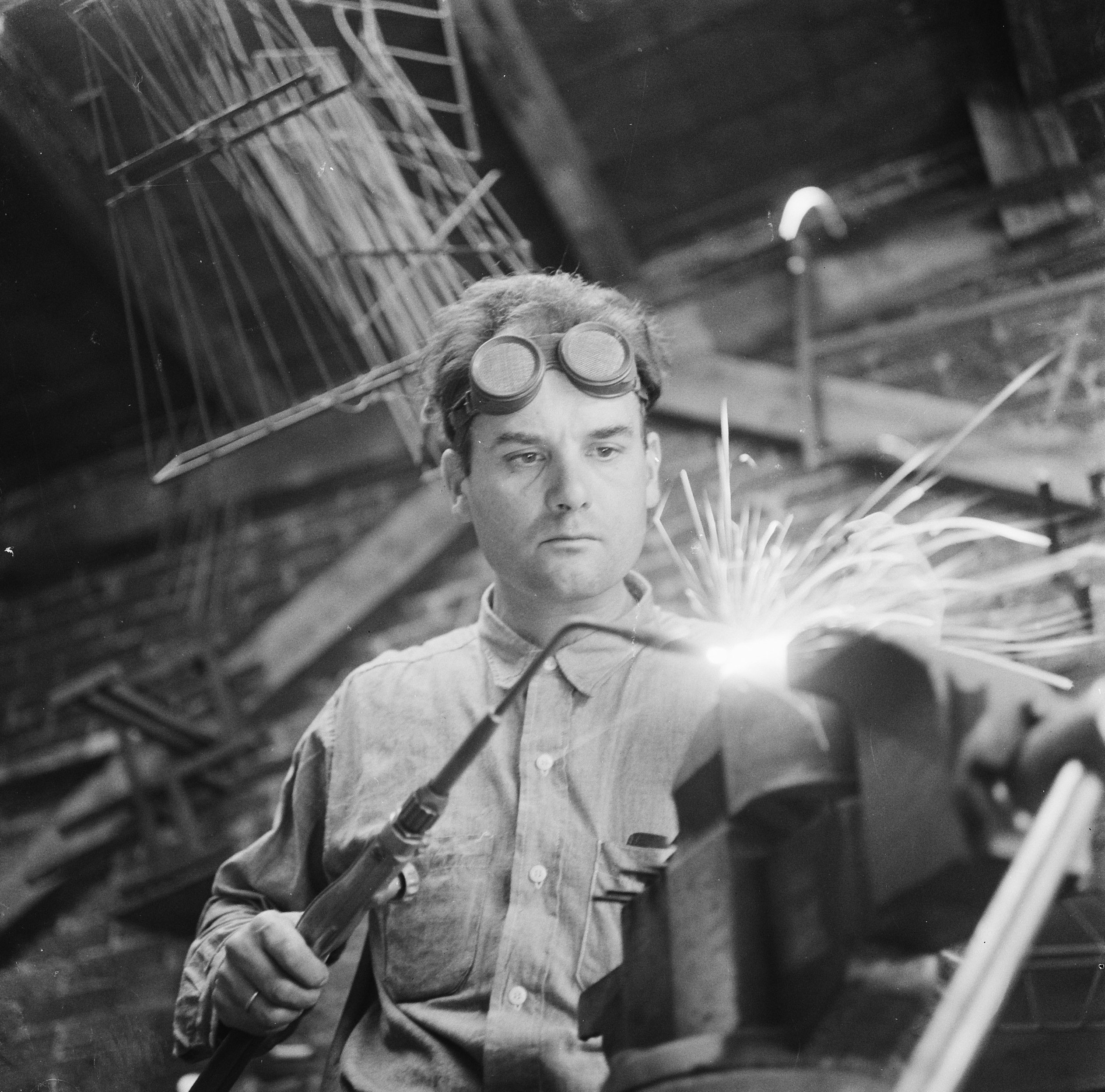
Carel Visser, 1964.

In his early career Visser created originally styled iron bird sculptures and had his first solo exhibition in 1954 at Galerie Martinet in Amsterdam. In 1957, when his artistic style became more abstract, a new period began in which he made several trips: a study trip to Italy (Sardinia) on a scholarship from the Italian government in 1957; a stay as a visiting professor at Washington University in St. Louis in 1962; and a study trip to Mexico on a Dutch government scholarship in 1965. Visser was a lecturer at the Royal Academy in The Hague from 1958 to 1962.

In 1968 Visser's work was exhibited at Documenta 4 in Kassel, Germany and in the same year he represented the Netherlands in the Venice Biennial, where he was awarded the David E. Bright sculpture prize. In the same year a documentary film about his work was made by Jonne Severijn. In 1981 Visser settled in Rijswijk (Gelderland). From 1966 to 1998 he was Professor at the Ateliers '63 in Haarlem. Visser was recipient of the 1992 Dr A. H. Heineken Prize for Art. In 2004 he received the Wilhelmina-ring for his lifetime achievements.

Visser died on 1 March 2015 in Le Fousseret, France, at the age of 86.

== Work ==
Carel Visser is seen as one of the most important constructivist sculptors of the Netherlands. His later work is characterized by the assembly of a variety of materials, such as tires, oil drums, car windows, leather, sheepskin, eggs and so on. He made organized connections, a kind of assemblages, with this so-called great and sometimes small objets trouvés (found objects). Some of his work has been compared to a musical composition in which repetition and variation play an important role.

Around 1960, Visser was focussed on massive closed cube of iron and "slack" cube wire. Visser, among other things, was inspired by nature (plants and animals) which also explains his use of natural materials such as wood, wool, sand, feathers, bones, rope and leather.

His works from the period 1975-1985 could be called environments, as opposed to the more sculptural work as the dying horse (about 1949).

== Gallery ==
=== 1950s ===
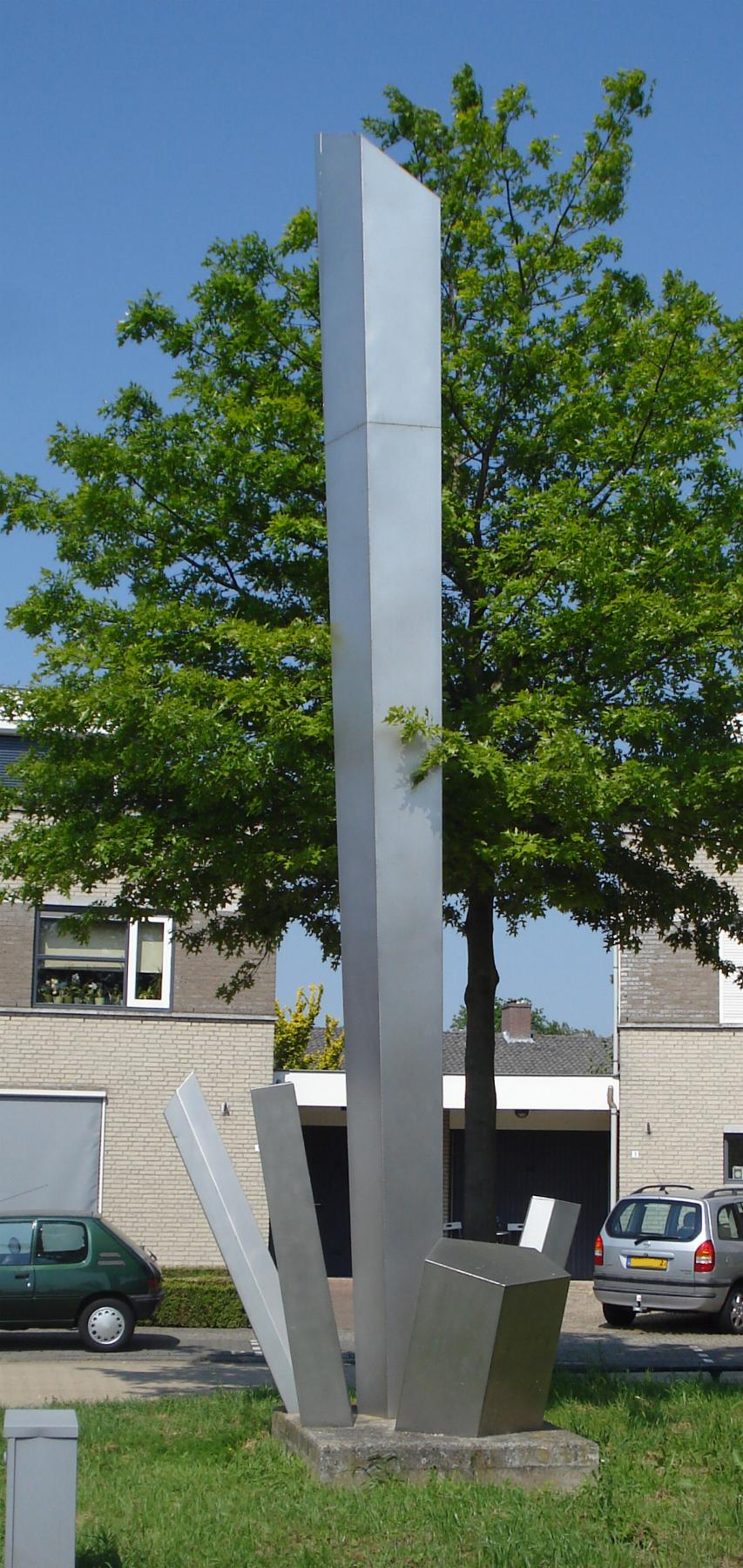
Opspuitend water, Leerdam, 1954

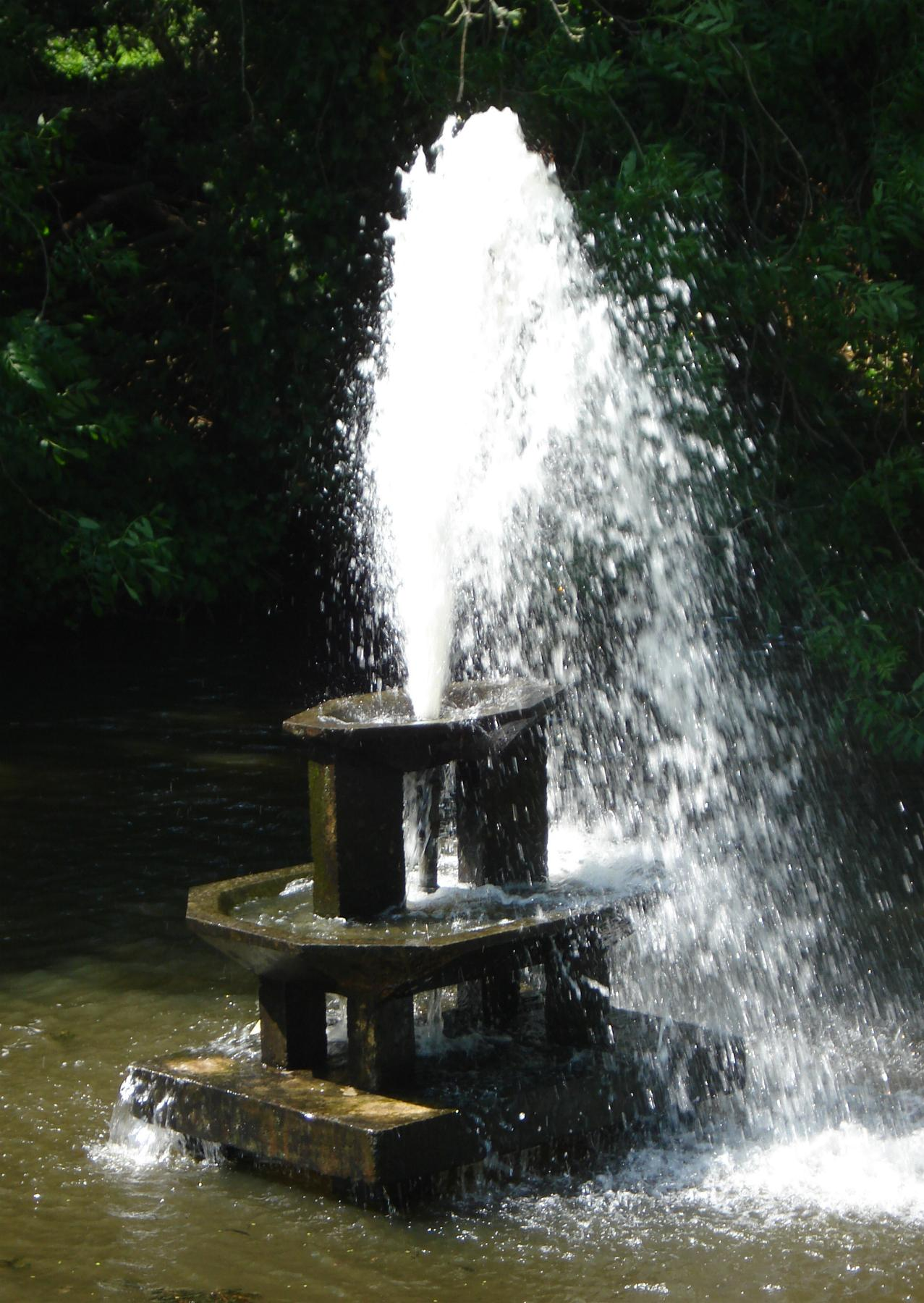
Fotein, Leerdam 1954

=== 1960s ===
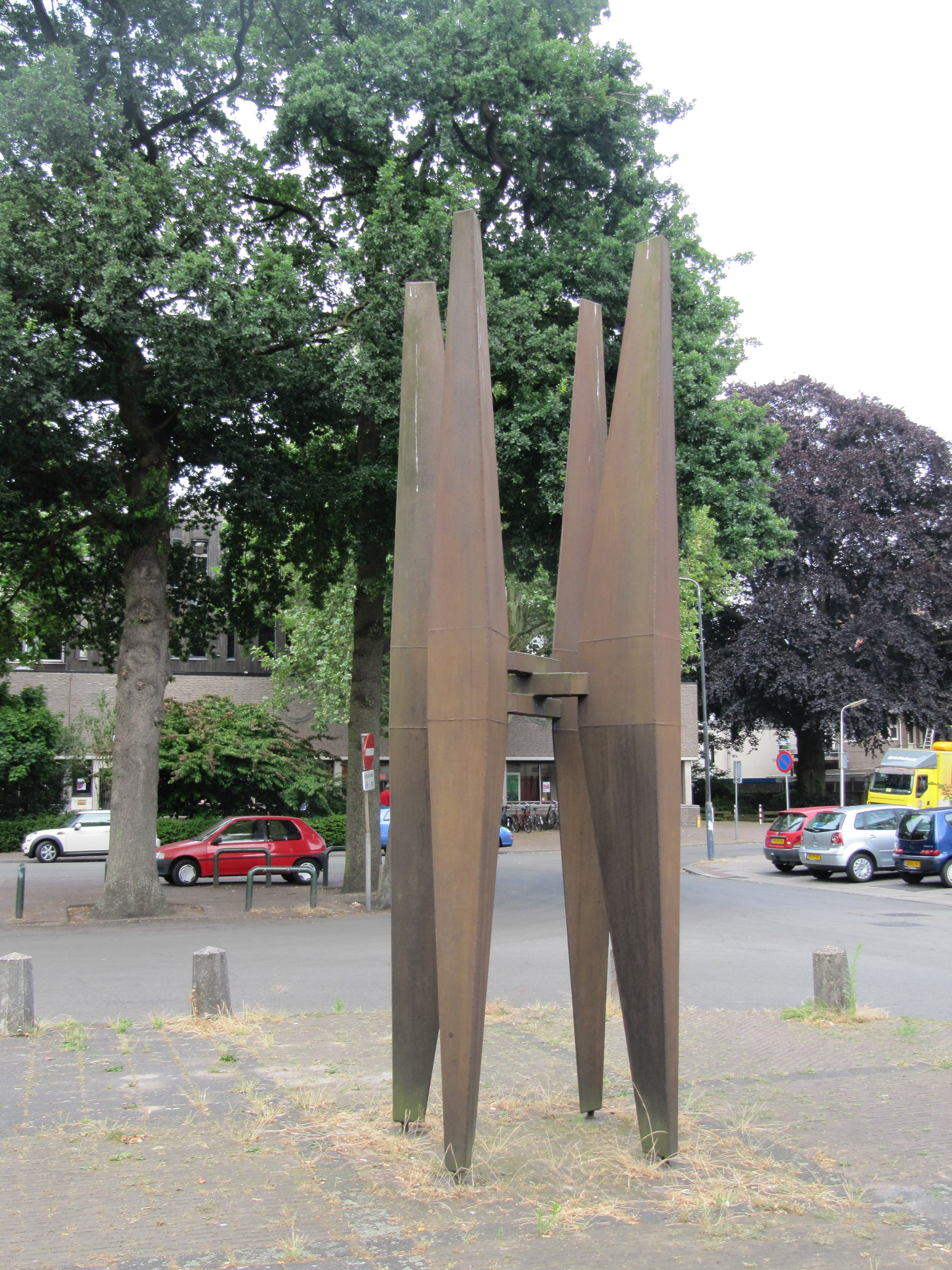
De Grote Vier (1962), Amersfoort

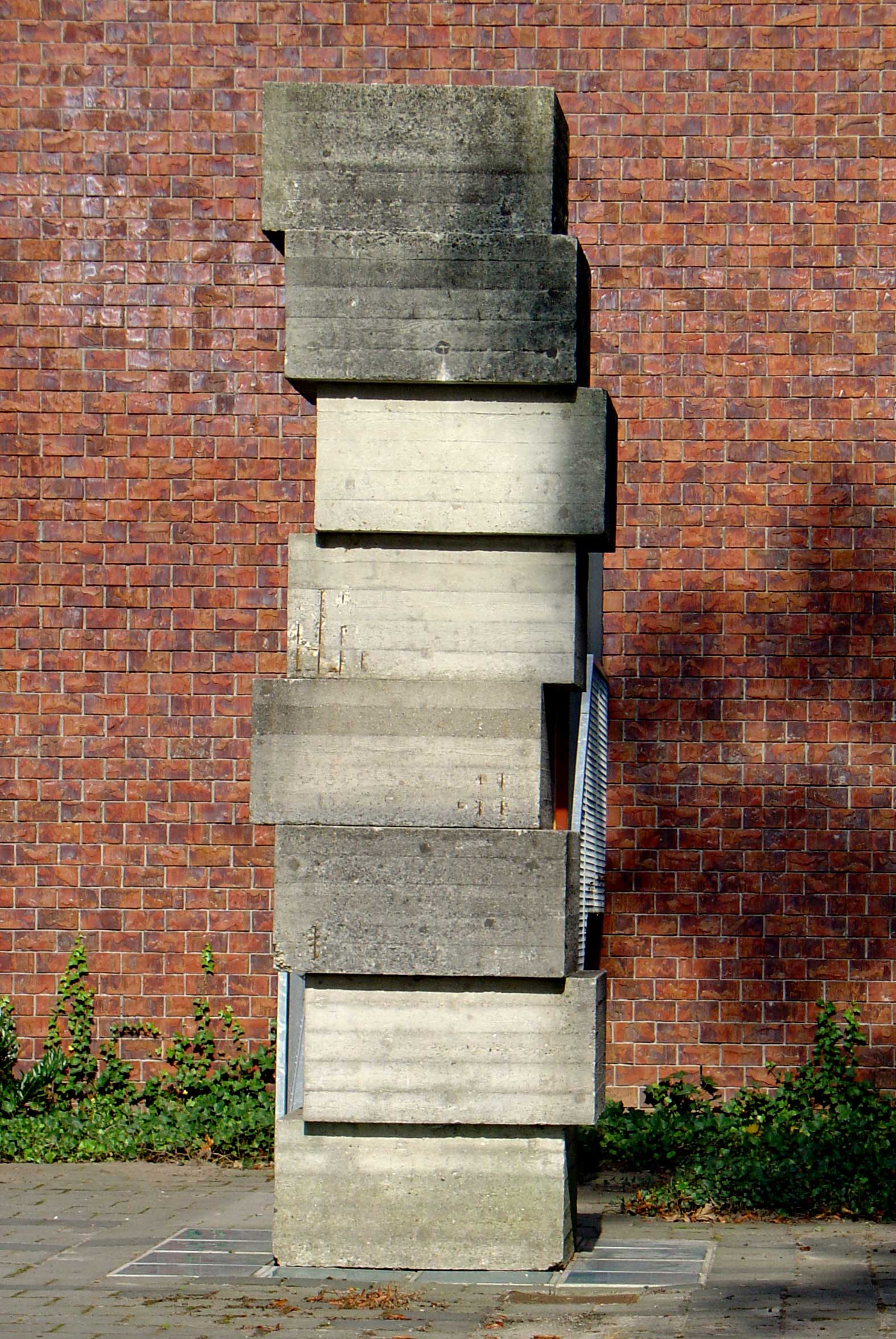
Stapeling (1965), Stadskanaal

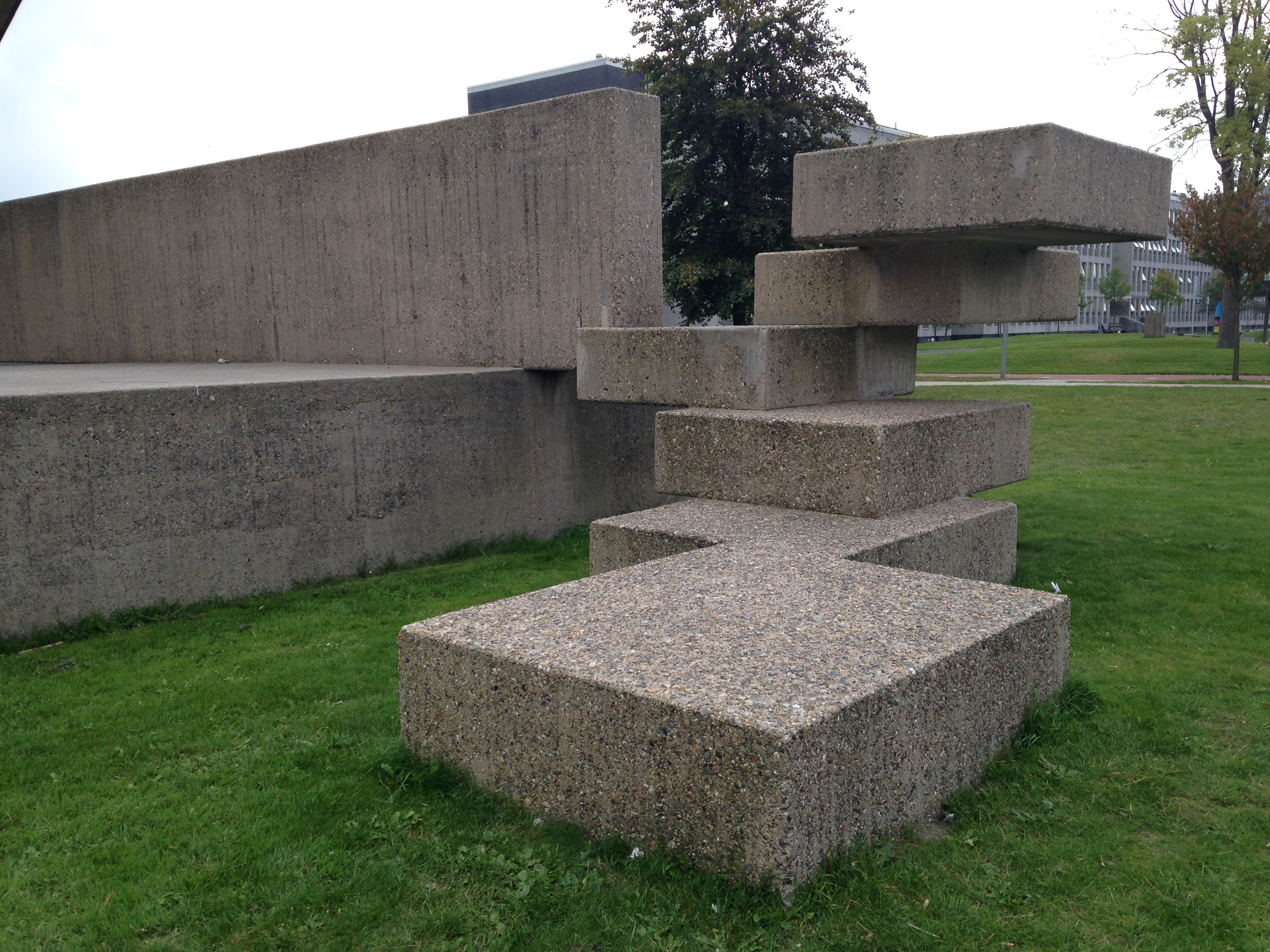
Salami (1966), Delft

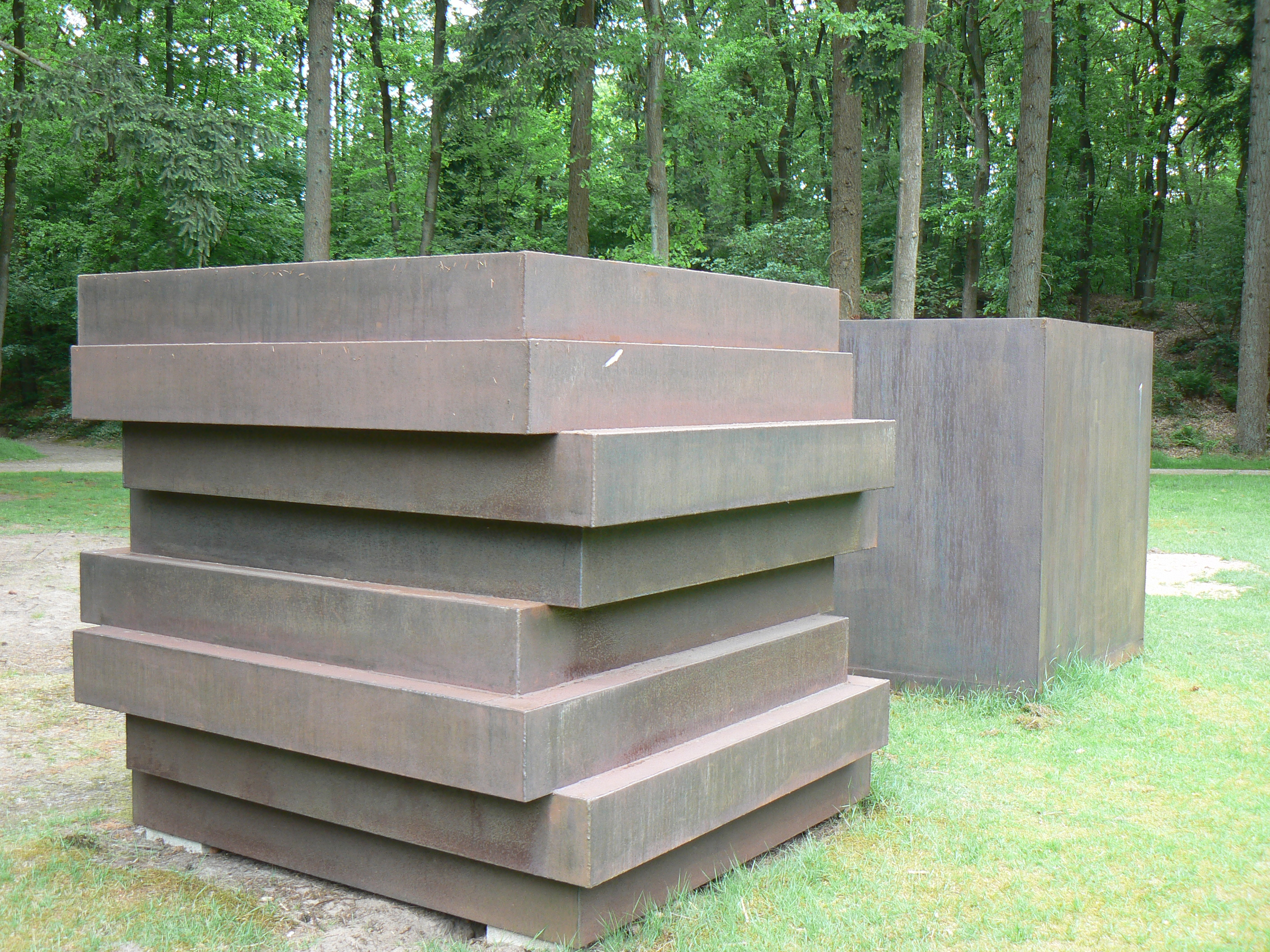
Kubus en zijn stapeling (1967), Otterlo

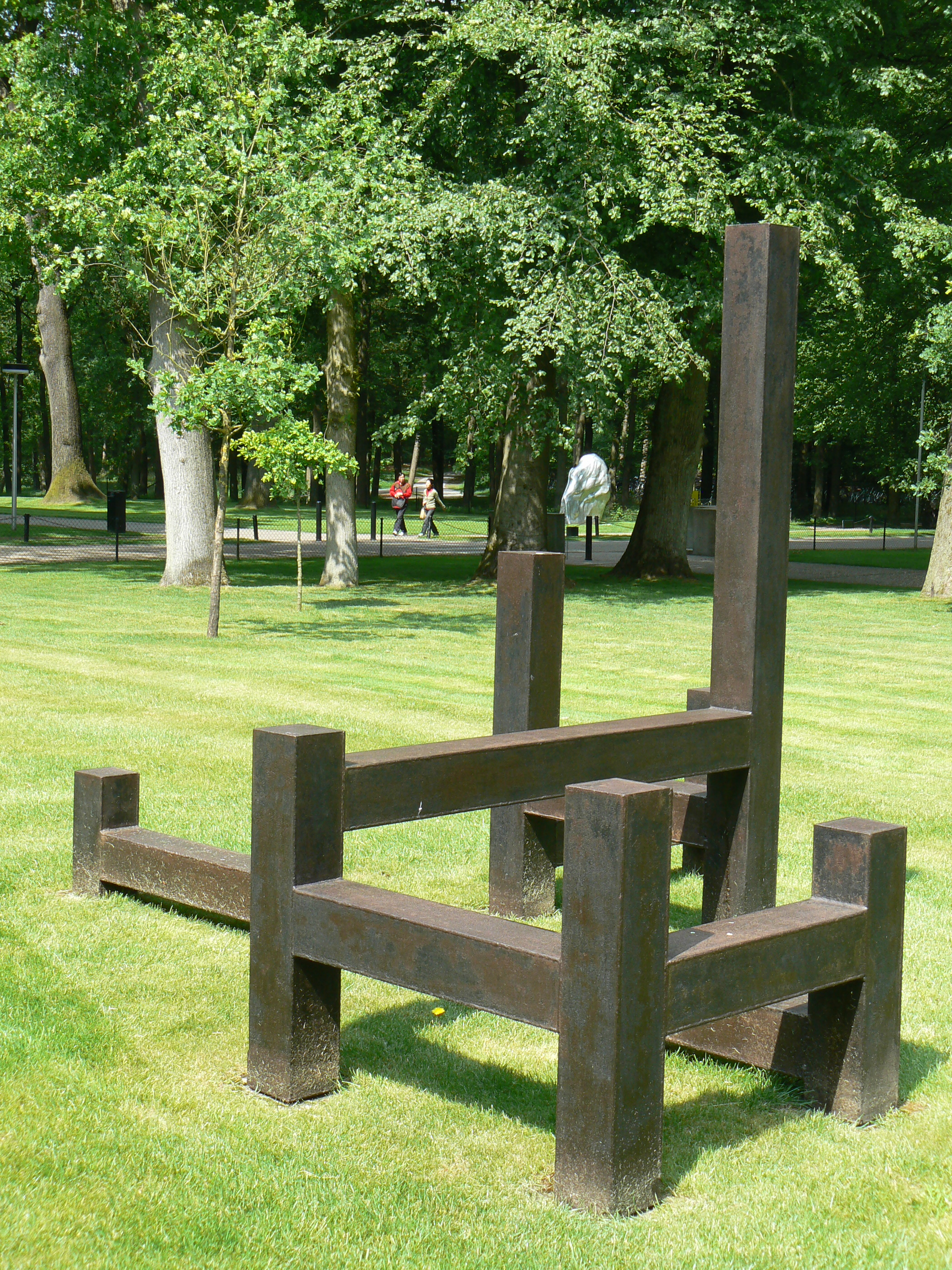
Grote Auschwitz (1967), Otterlo

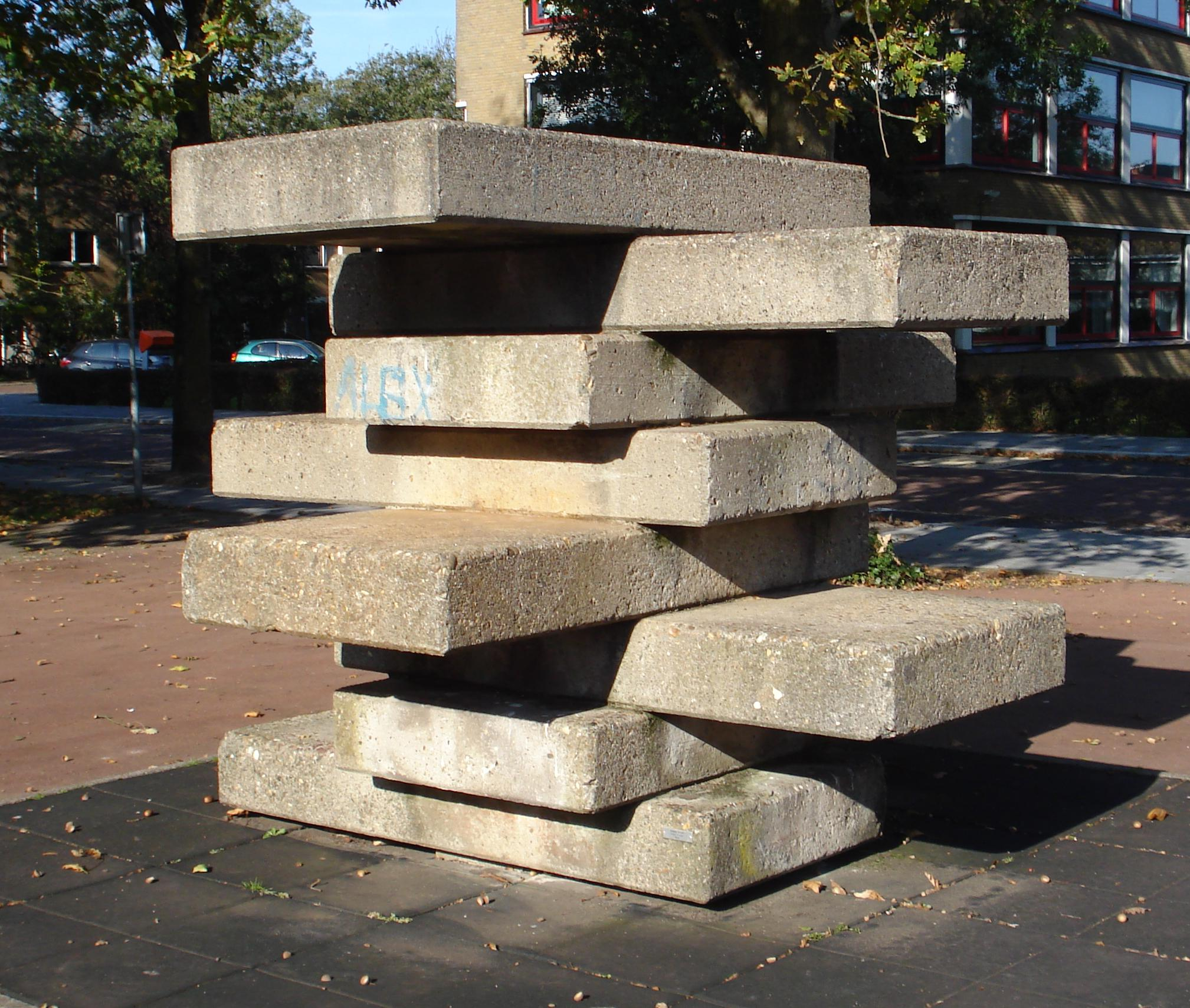
Speelplastiek (1968), Oegstgeest

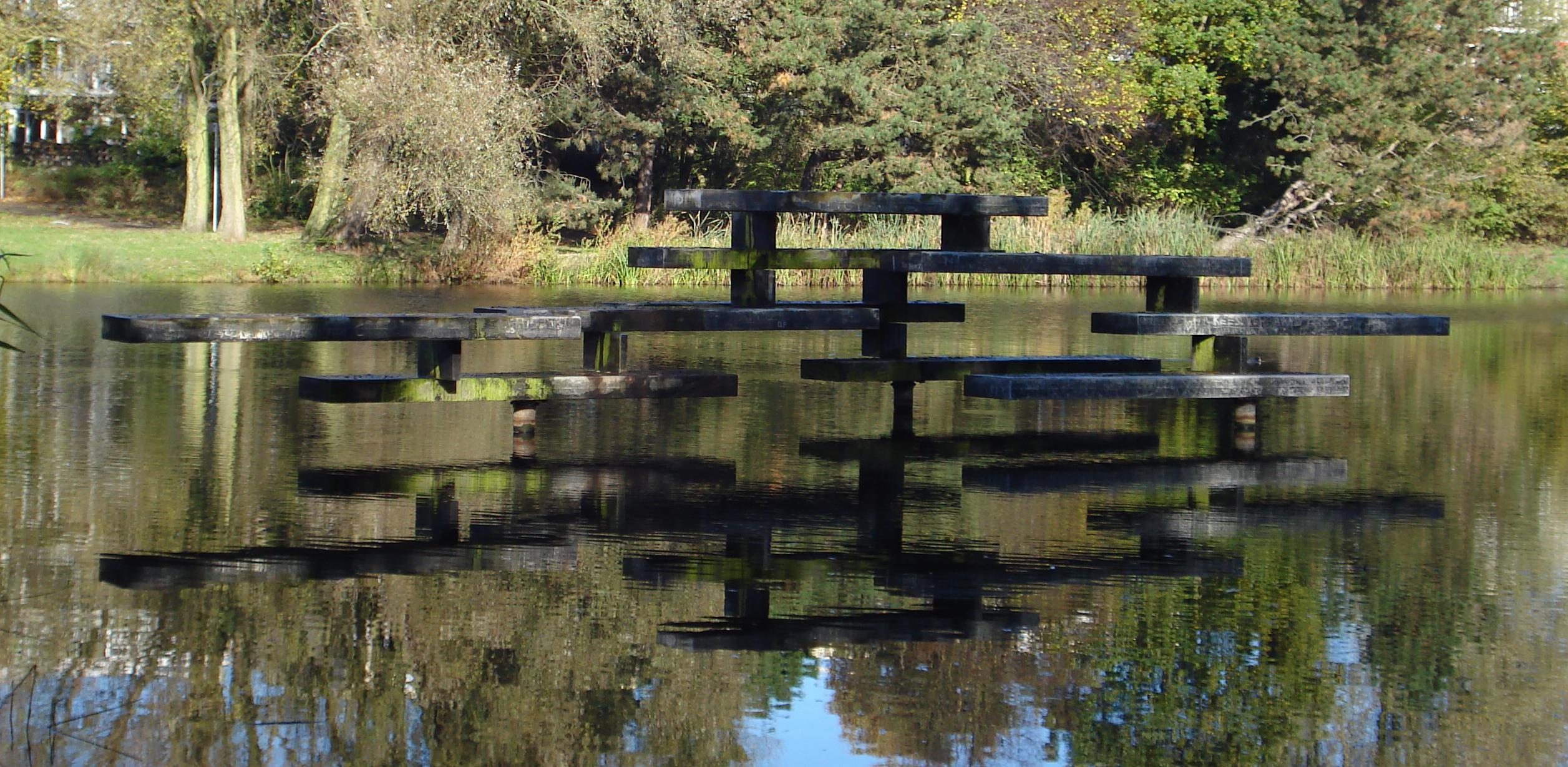
When the saints go marching in (1968), The Hague

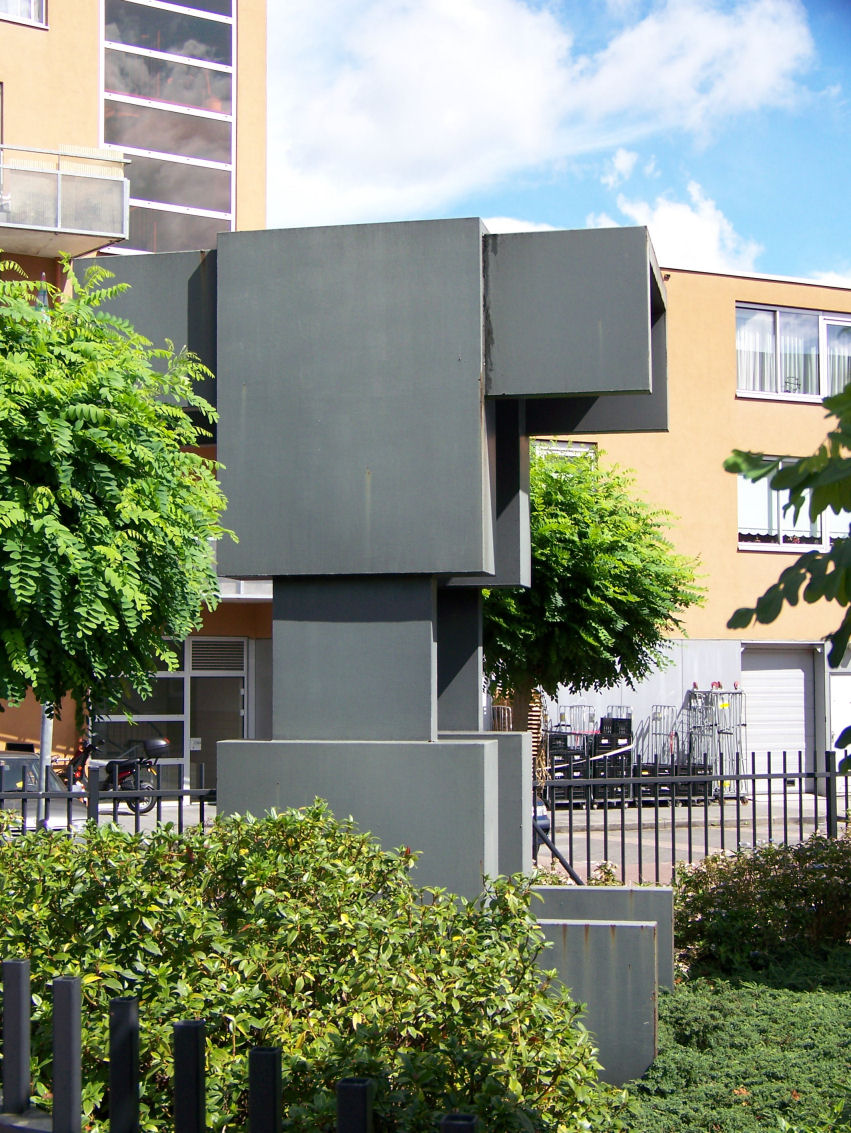
De Poort (1969), Groningen

=== 1970s ===
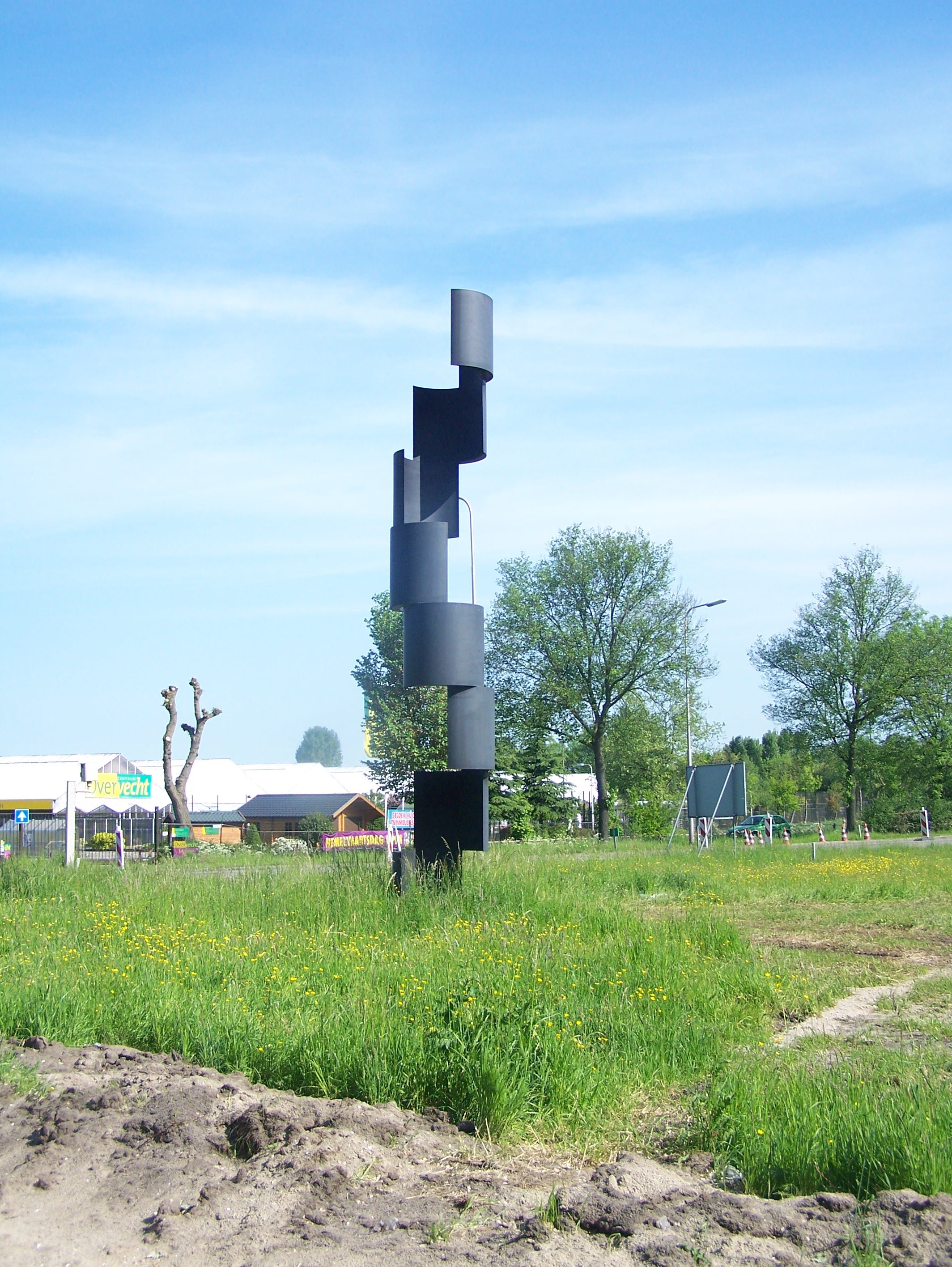
No title (1975), Utrecht

=== 1980s ===
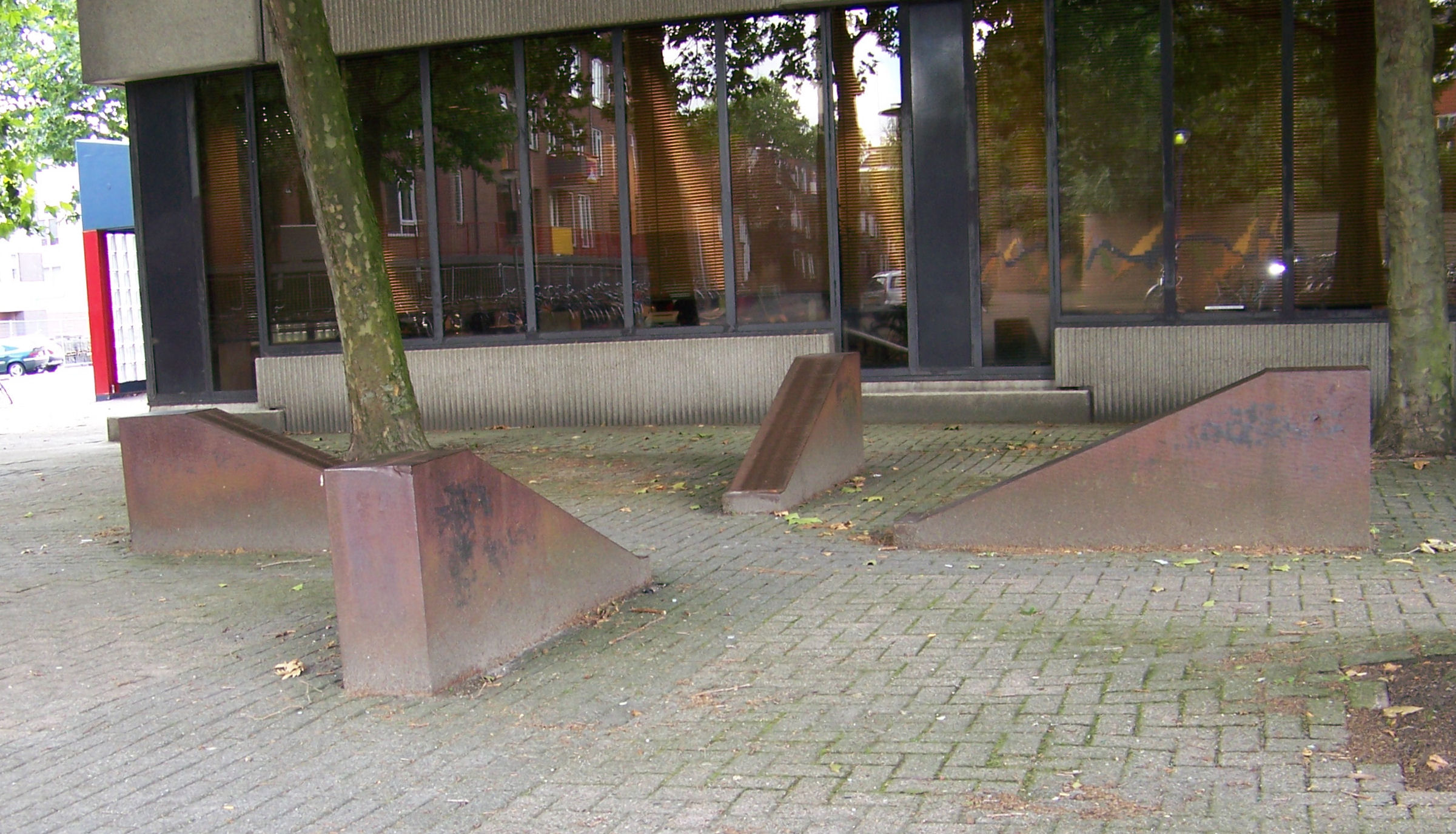
Vier Wiggen (1980), Groningen

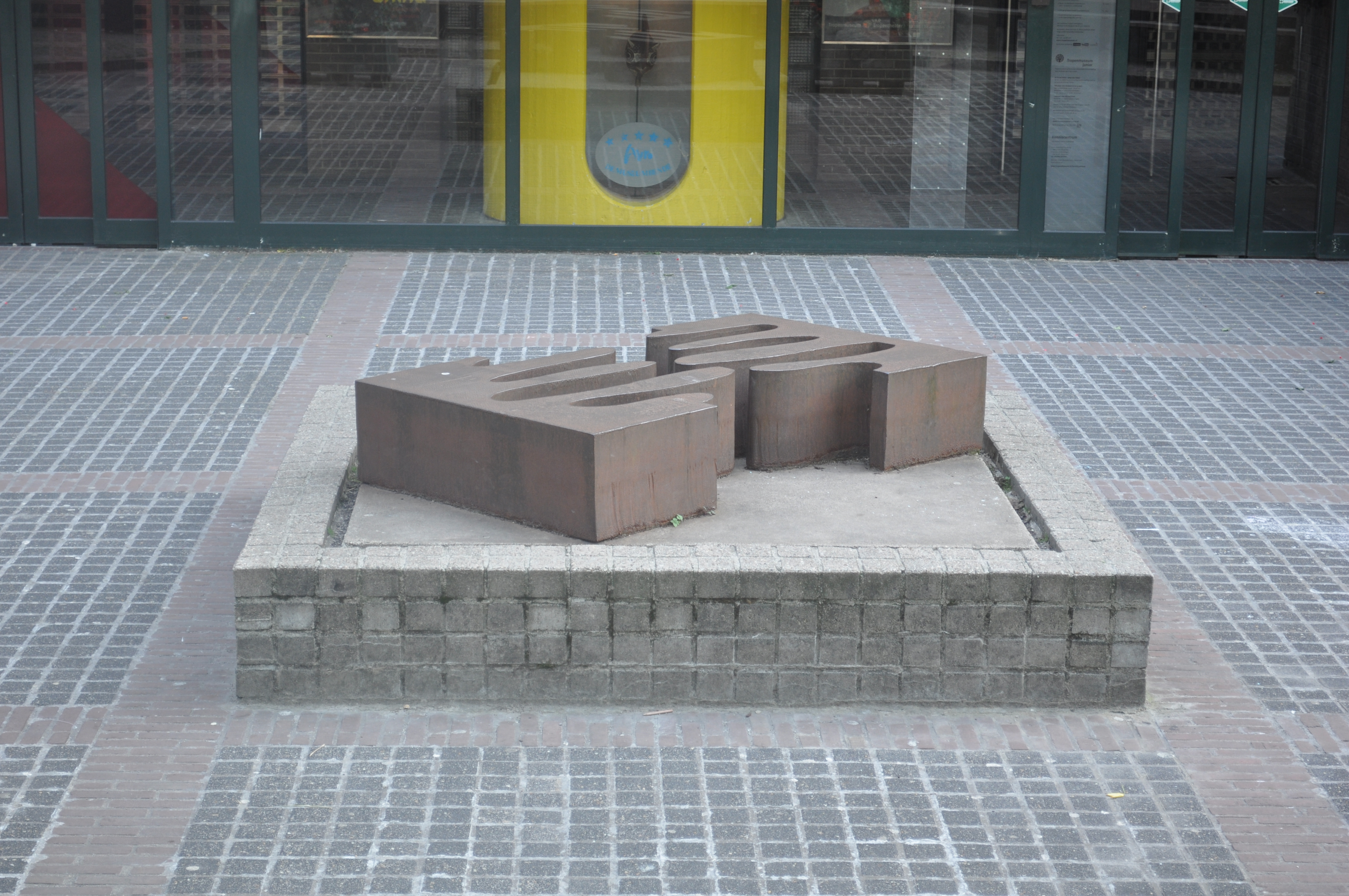
Vijfstromenland (1981), Amsterdam

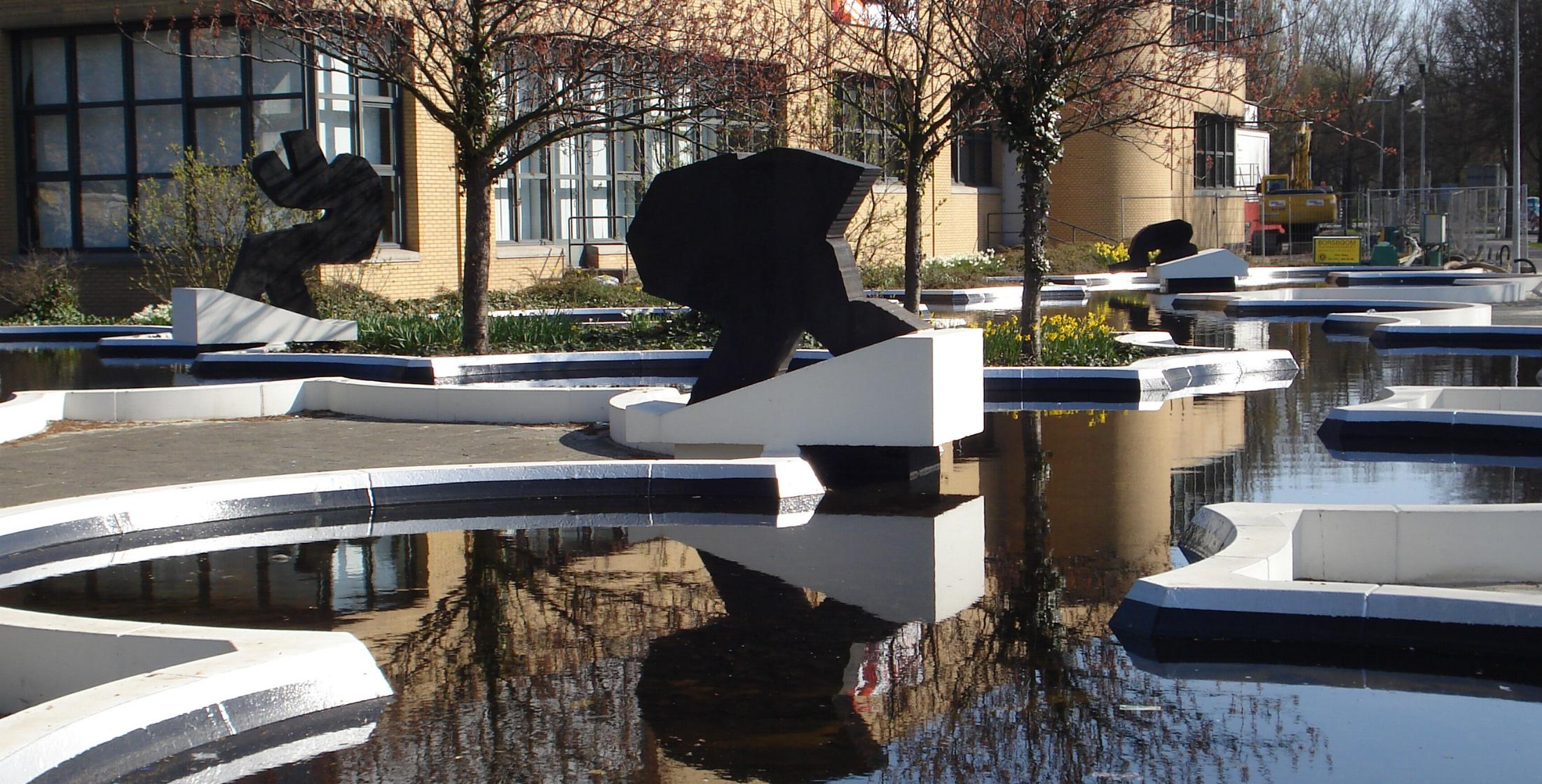
Zes sculpturen (1985), Den Haag

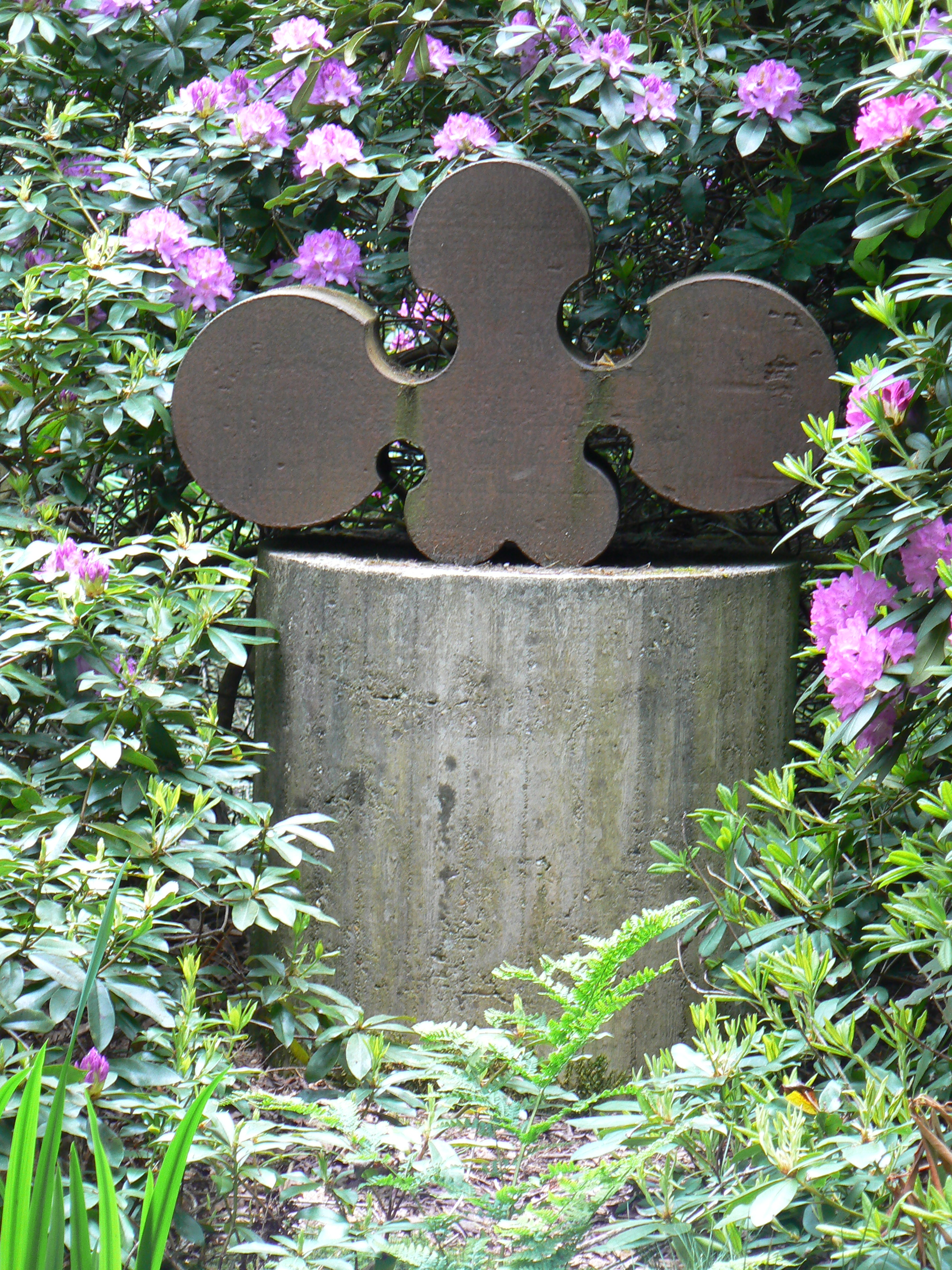
Untitled (1988), sculpturepark KMM

=== 1990s ===
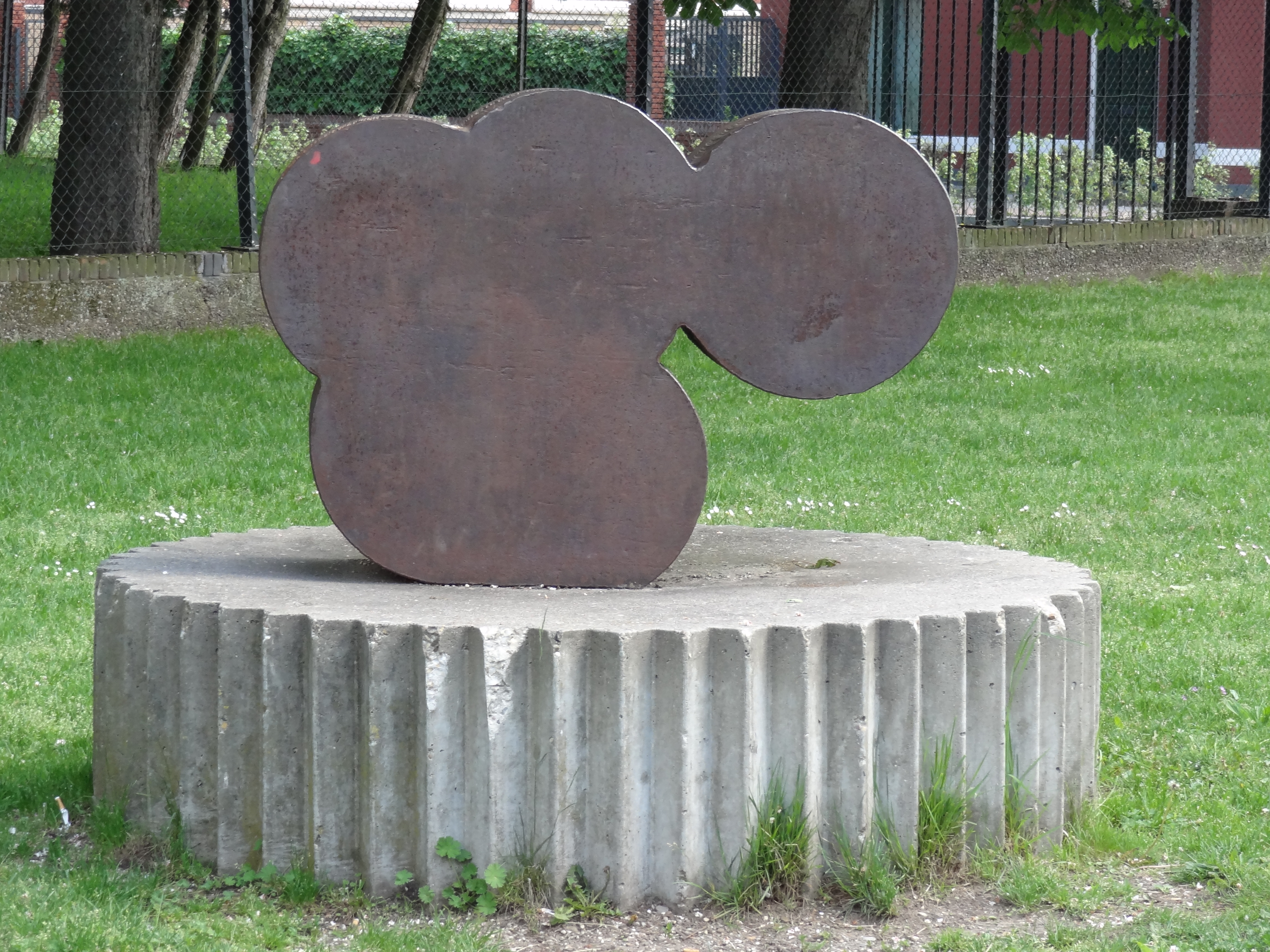
Untitled (1991), Nijmegen

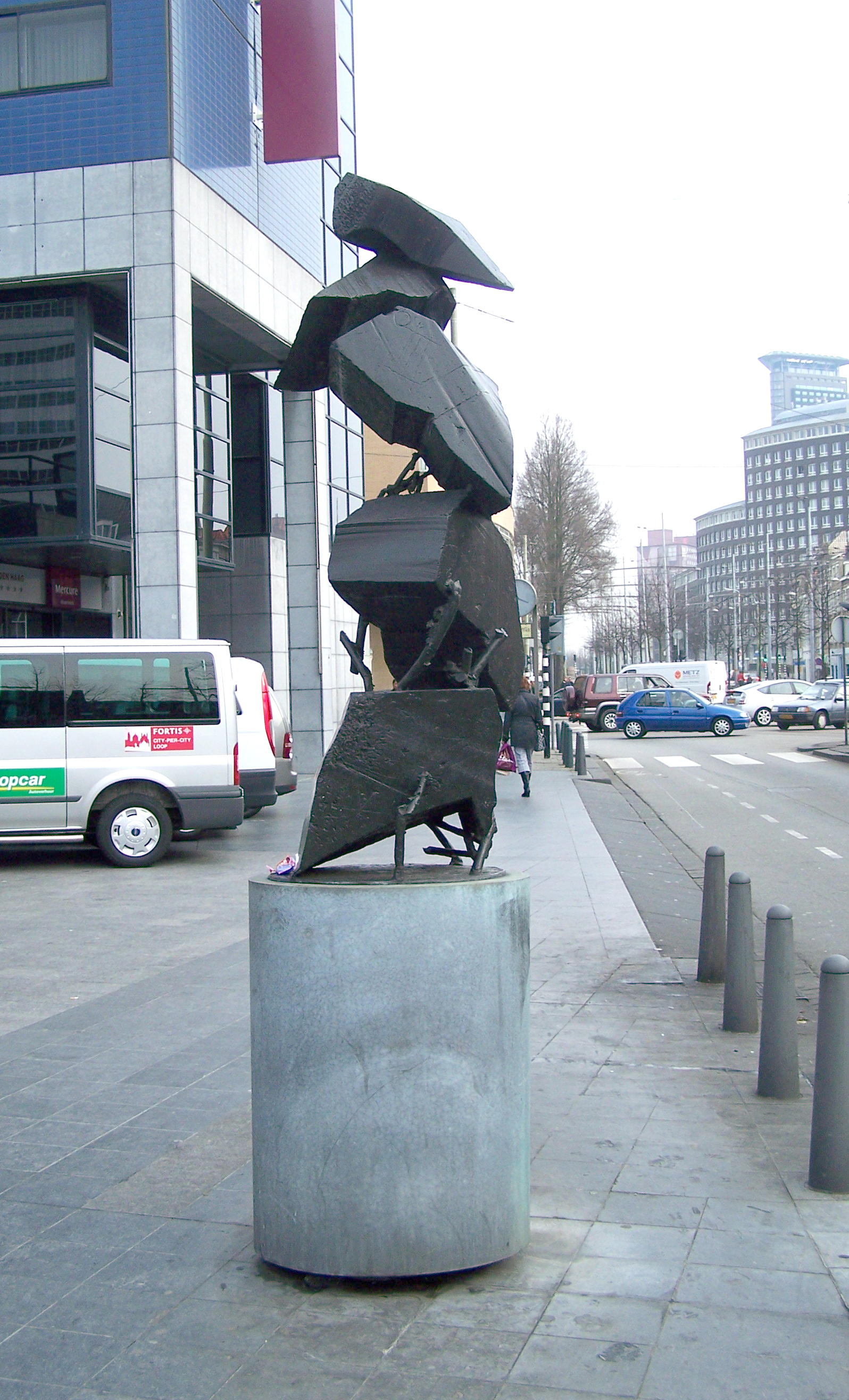
Sculpture (no title) (1994) at the Spui in The Hague

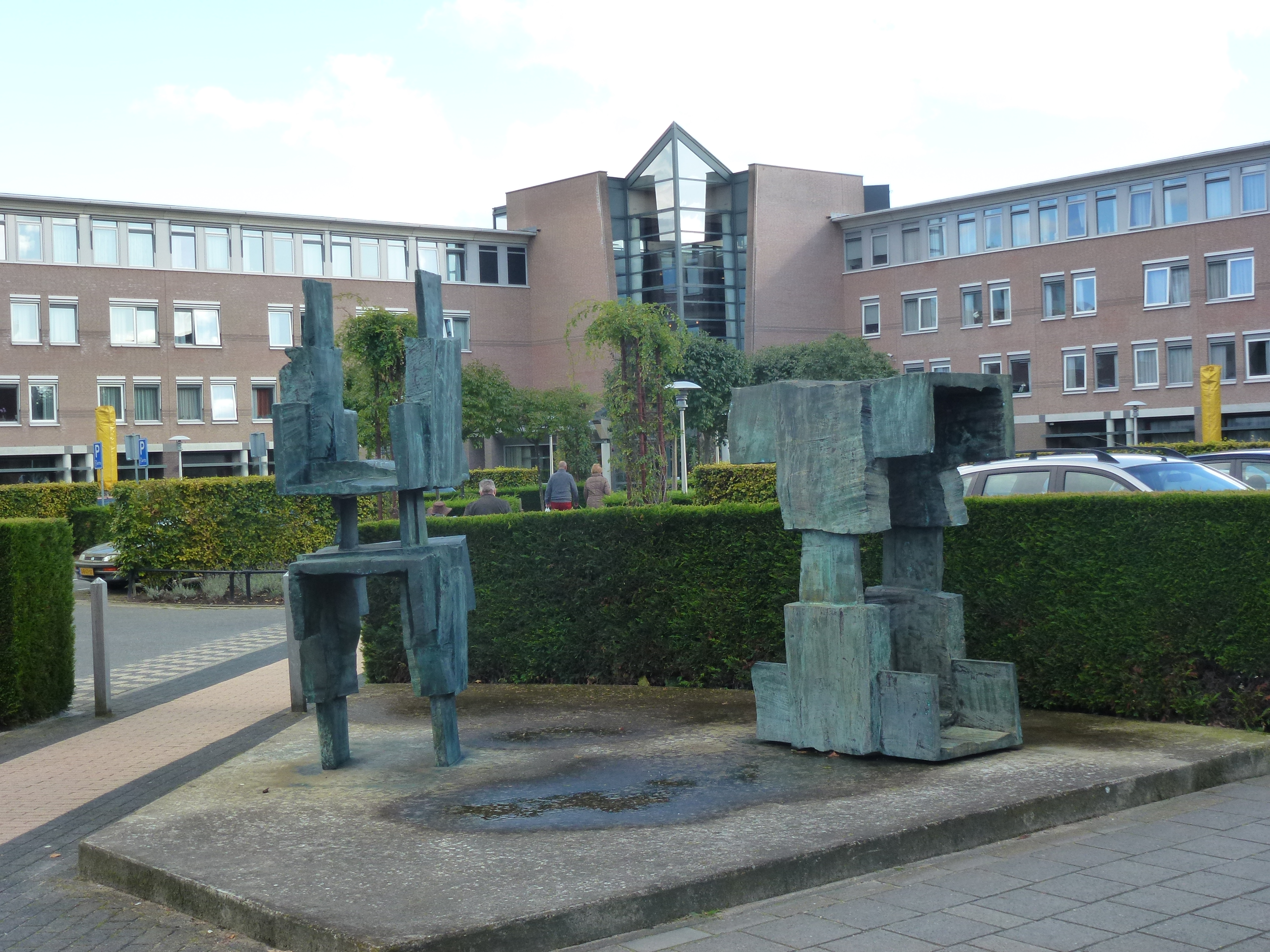
Vogels (1998), Eindhoven

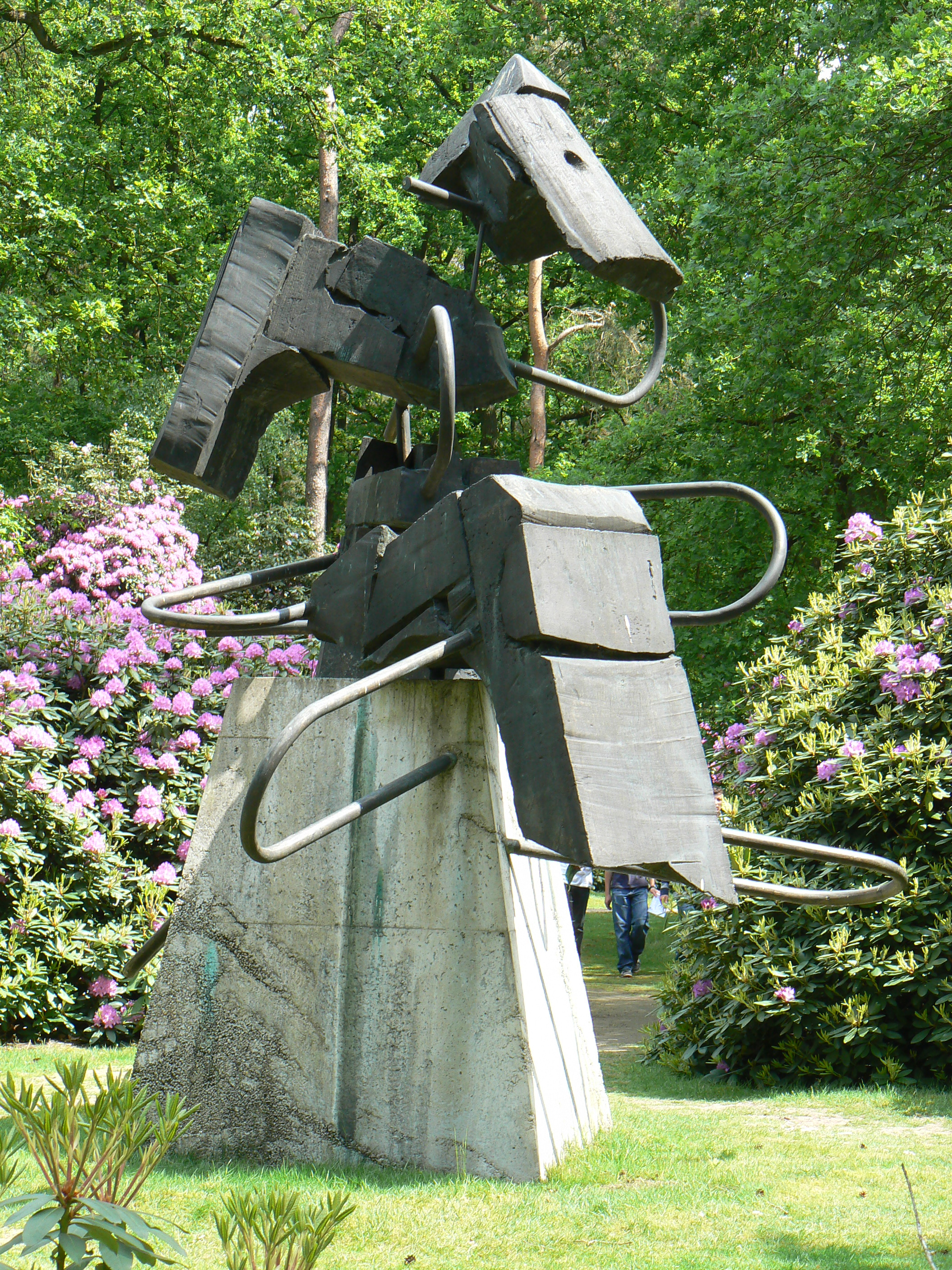
Pleinbeeld (1998)

=== New millennium ===
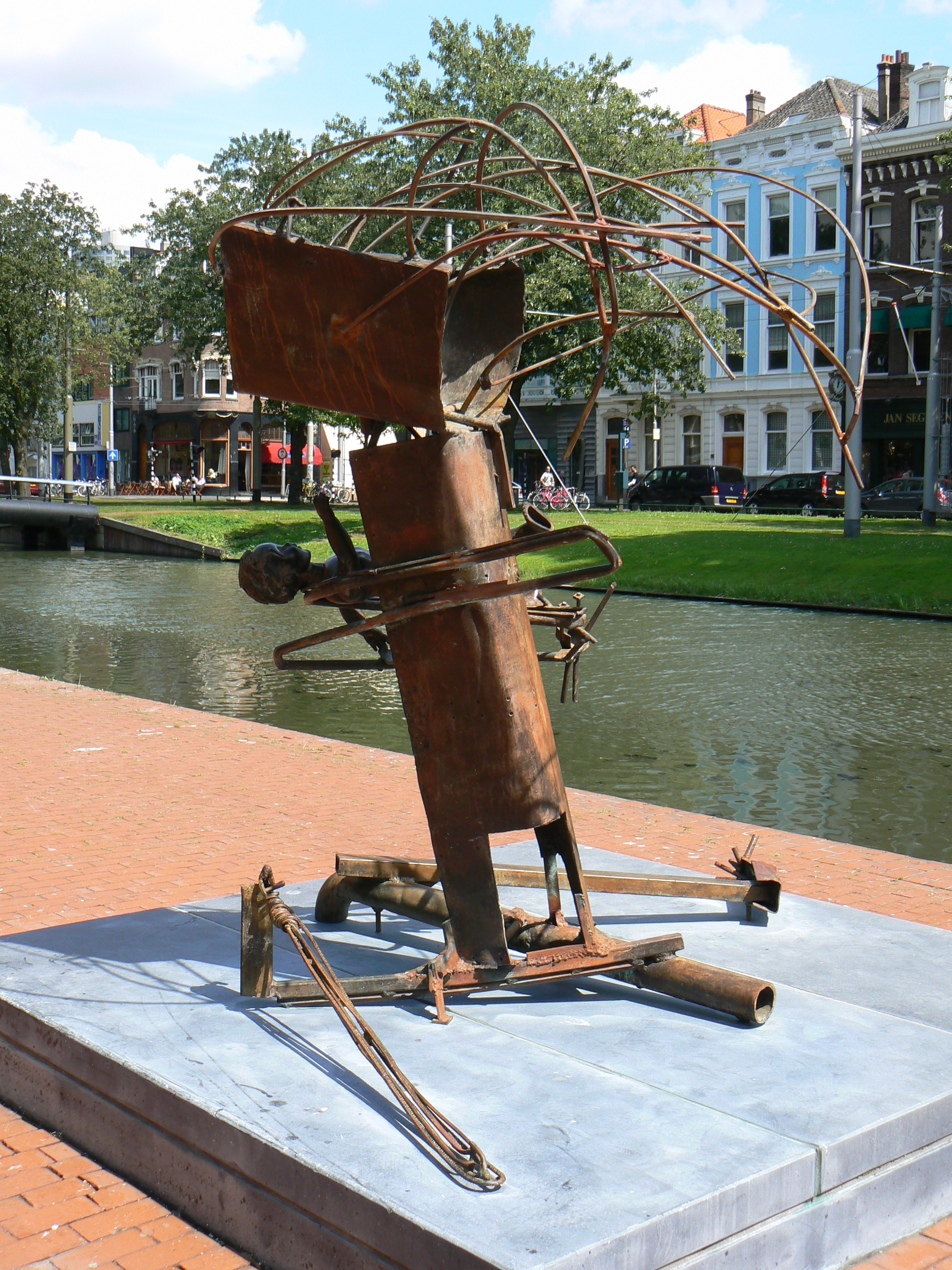
Moeder en kind (2000), Rotterdam

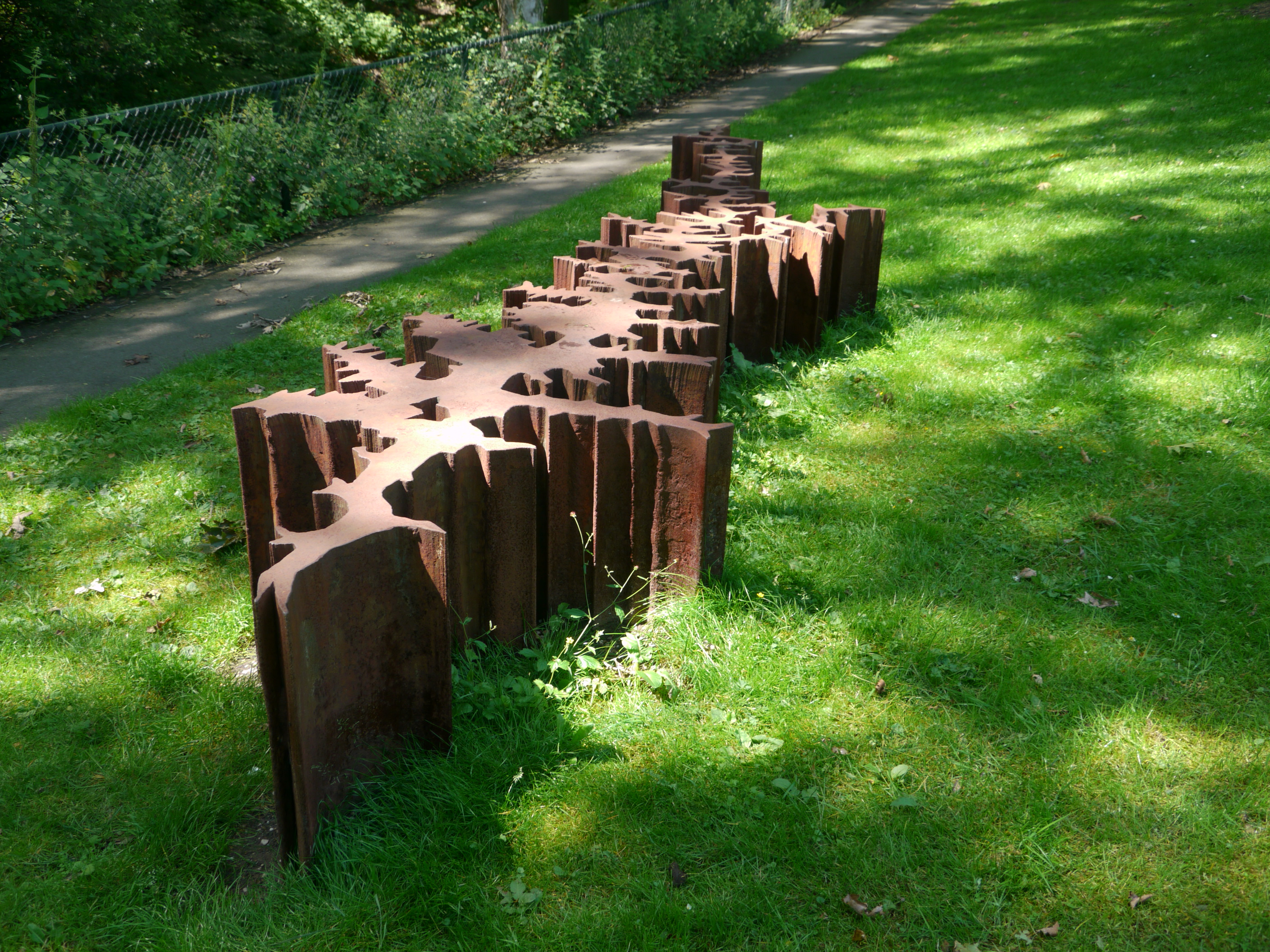
Meer (2004), Apeldoorn
