= Dominic van den Boogerd =

Dutch art critic and art historian

Dominic van den Boogerd (*1959) is a Dutch art critic and art historian situated in Amsterdam.

Van den Boogerd has been active as an art critic since 1983. From 1993 to 1995, he was chief editor of Metropolis M. He also published articles in trendy art magazines such as the Dutch HP/De Tijd, the international art magazine Parkett, the London frieze magazine, the Belgian art magazine De Witte Raaf, the U.S. non-profit art magazine Art Papers, and the Stedelijk Museum Bulletin.

Furthermore, Van den Boogerd is co-author of a book on the South African born Dutch artist Marlene Dumas (1999). In the Survey chapter, for instance, he examines Dumas's work in relation to a range of conceptual legacies in depictions of the human figure.

Van den Boogerd was also guest lecturer at the Fachhochschule für Kunst und Gestaltung, Bern, and at the Institute of Technology/Fine Arts, Dublin. In 1995 he was appointed director of De Ateliers program for artists in Amsterdam.

== Select publications ==
- Anton Henning: Superpassing surplus. Tilburg, 2002.
- Didier Vermeiren: Collection de solides. Eindhoven, 2003.
- Blue Tuesdays: De Ateliers 1963-2003. Amsterdam, 2004.
- Marlene Dumas. Second edition. London: Phaidon, 2009.
- New Tribal Labyrinth. Published on the occasion of the dual exhibition Manufactuur / Slave City, November 2012 - February 2013 at Grimm Gallery in Amsterdam. Amsterdam 2014.
