= Hayley Tompkins =

British artist based in Glasgow (born 1971)

Hayley Tompkins (born 1971) is a British artist based in Glasgow. She is best known for her minimal works that bridge painting and object-making. Her paintings and installations include everyday, found objects. Her twin sister is the visual and sound artist Sue Tompkins.

== Early life and education ==
Tompkins was born in 1971 in Leighton Buzzard. Hayley earned a BA in painting and an MFA from The Glasgow School of Art.

== Career ==
Tompkins primarily works in small-format watercolour painting and lo-fi sculptures. She created a series of works she called Metabuilts. These ready-mades are often painted and assembled together. They occasionally include found photographs or fragments of photographs. Tompkins has said that she looks "to create an atmosphere, or a blurring of meaning surrounding the objects".

With items as simple as a chair lined up along the floor or as complicated as an image full of blotched colors, Tompkins gets her point across by allowing the viewer to get to whatever conclusion or "wall plug" that they find. Reviewer Roberta Smith also described "Space Kitchen' as "a resonant balance between pictorial and physical." On the walls are "shallow, translucent plastic trays" filled with "watercolor-thin acrylic pastel shades" within, which Smith describes as a "lunar luminosity" with "skewed spherical forms." Sarah King adds that 'Space Kitchen' had an "ethereal cosmic quality" and seemed to "glow from within".

Tompkins describes herself as “a painter [who] aims to interpret the world around [her] and to visually reconstruct and remodel [her] lived experience in a variety of ways.[She] is inspired by the mimetic quality of paint - the fact that paint can turn into something. It’s like a renewable energy. [She] wants to make things out of paint that are both outer-worldly, yet ordinary at the same time.”

Tompkins work is often described as and compared to the early works of Georgia O'Keeffe.

== Exhibitions ==
Selected solo exhibitions include: The Common Guild, Glasgow (2014); Aspen Art Museum, Aspen (2013); Currents, Studio Voltaire, London (2011); A Piece of Eight, The Modern Institute, Osborne Street, Glasgow (2011); Autobuilding, Inverleith House, Edinburgh (2009); and Re, The Drawing Room, London (2008).

Selected exhibitions include: Life Like Looking (with Arthur Laidlaw), Efremidis, Seoul (2023); The Persistence of Objects, Lismore Castle Arts, Lismore, curated by the Common Guild (2015); The Grass is Singing, Mendes Wood DM, São Paulo, curated by The Modern Institute (2015); I Cheer a Dead Man’s Sweetheart, De La Warr Pavilion, Bexhill (2014); The Imminence of Poetics, São Paulo Biennale, São Paulo (2012); and Watercolour, Tate Britain, London (2011).

She was also one of three artists to represent Scotland at the 2013 Venice Biennial.

== Awards and recognition ==
Tompkins was nominated for a Beck's Futures prize in 2004.

She is also on the panel of selectors for the 2018 Summer and Autumn Visual Art Residencies at Hospitalfield.
