= Didier Vermeiren =

Belgian artist

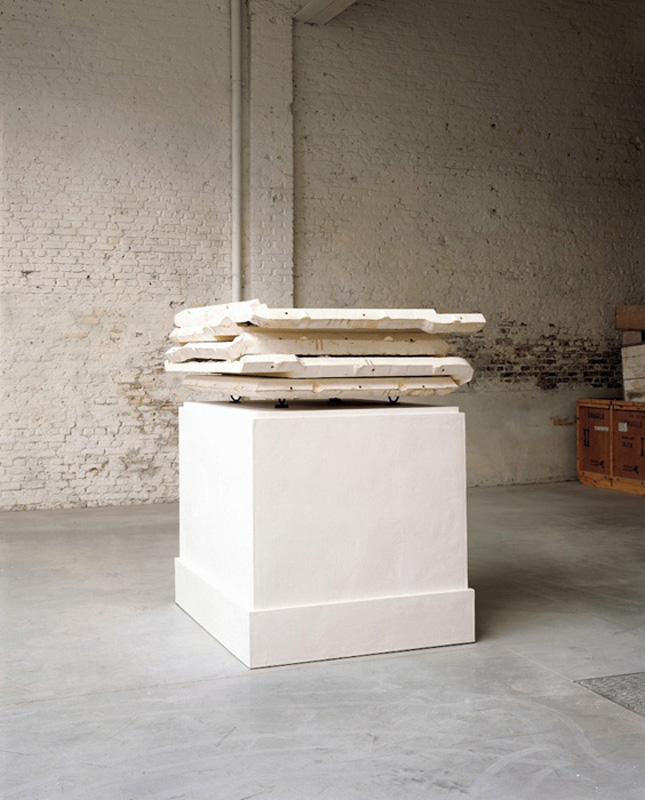
- Adam, Tate Modern Collection (1999).
- Born: 10 July 1951 (age 74); Brussels
- Known for: Sculpture, photography
- Movement: Minimalism, conceptual art

Didier Vermeiren (born 10 July 1951) is a Belgian sculptor.

His first works, in the 1970s, stood at the crossroads of conceptual art, minimal art and the tradition of modern sculpture. Afterwards, the photographical documentation of his own work became more and more significant, until it became an entire aspect of it, photographs and sculptures responding to each other and generating new works all the while.

Didier Vermeiren lives and work in Paris and Brussels. He has been teaching since 2002 at the Kunstakademie Düsseldorf in Germany and since 1991 at De Ateliers, Amsterdam (Netherlands). He is a member of the board of the Musée Rodin (Paris).

== Work ==
In the late 1970s, he turned his attention to the question, essential in the history of modern sculpture, of the plinth, or base. creating the "plinth sculptures" through which he was introduced to the international art scene, starting with a group show at the Museum of Modern Art in 1984, titled An International Survey of Recent Painting and Sculpture.

Traditionally, the base was not considered to be part of the sculpture, but served to transport the sculpted figure from the "real" space into the artistic or monumental space. The function of the plinth as pedestal then gradually disappeared in the course of the twentieth century. Whereas certain artists, like Brancusi, turned the plinth into an integral part of their work by incorporating it into the sculpture, others no longer wanted the sculpted object to be separated from the ground by this presentational element and chose to place the sculpture directly on the floor, on the same level as the spectator. Modernism, in other words, made the plinth useless. Taking this development seriously, but wanting to think it through more rigorously, Vermeiren reevaluated the purpose of the plinth and turned it into an autonomous volume in the space: if the plinth is a base or a foundation, it can be displayed for its own sake and on its own merits, taking on the fate of a work of art. All that is left is the pure presence on the ground and its many sculptural possibilities. This gave rise to an ongoing dialogue with space. Situating works in the space and reconfiguring the space in relation to these works became the purpose of every exhibition. For Vermeiren, space is not empty, but plastic, which is why he thinks of his works as hollowing it out and sculpting it.

Sculpture's incorporation of the space — the entire space, including the firmament — constitutes one of the characteristic features of twentieth-century sculpture. Carl Andre, in dialogue with Brancusi's Endless Column, once stated that his sculptures, as horizontal, flat and low-lying as they are, nevertheless support "a column of air" on their entire surface area. This column can be pictured as extending "endlessly" above the works, or as bounded by the vault of heaven or that of a building.

Beginning in the seventies, Vermeiren set out to explore this incorporation of space and the sculptural demarcation of pure presence on the ground. We might think here of his works consisting of an object made of solid and heavy material (a parallelipided of stone, plaster or iron) placed on an object of identical size but made of soft and light material (polyurethane foam), with one crushing the other in a demonstration of the weight of the work in every sculptural project. Then, in a direct confrontation with the problem of the plinth — which is also the problem of tradition — Vermeiren began to exhibit "replicas" of plinths of sculptures by Rodin, Carpeaux, Chamberlain..., usually made from the same material (plaster, bronze, etc.) as the figures their originals supported in the museum. It was no longer space in general that was incorporated into the work, but the space of tradition — in a gesture of memory.

The plinth for Vermeiren is thus not simply a "ready-made" or a found object, but rather brings into play the very origin of the work of art. In a truly plastic process, the artist reconfigures, reworks and "sculpts" the chosen volume using traditional techniques (such as modelling, moulding or assemblage) in order to accomplish the incorporation of space and presence into the work. To this end, a "plinth" can be posed in reverse on another one identical to it, or on its negative (its own mould), or even turned inside out like a glove with the armature on the outside.

Thus, if Vermeiren's sculptures often make references to other sculptures that belong to the history of his art, this approach only becomes meaningful to the extent that his pieces also refer back and forth to each other within his own body of work. A sculpture is always like a term in a sequence and forms a response to earlier works. In this sense, Vermeiren's work is also always a remembering of his work. Each of the artist's exhibition looks both backward and forward

== Collections ==
Vermeiren's works are part of several major public collections such as the Museum of Modern Art (MoMA), New-York, the Hirshhorn Museum and Sculpture Garden, Washington DC, the Tate Modern, London, the Centre Georges Pompidou, Paris, the Van Abbemuseum, Eindhoven, the Bonnefanten Museum, Maastricht.

== Exhibitions ==
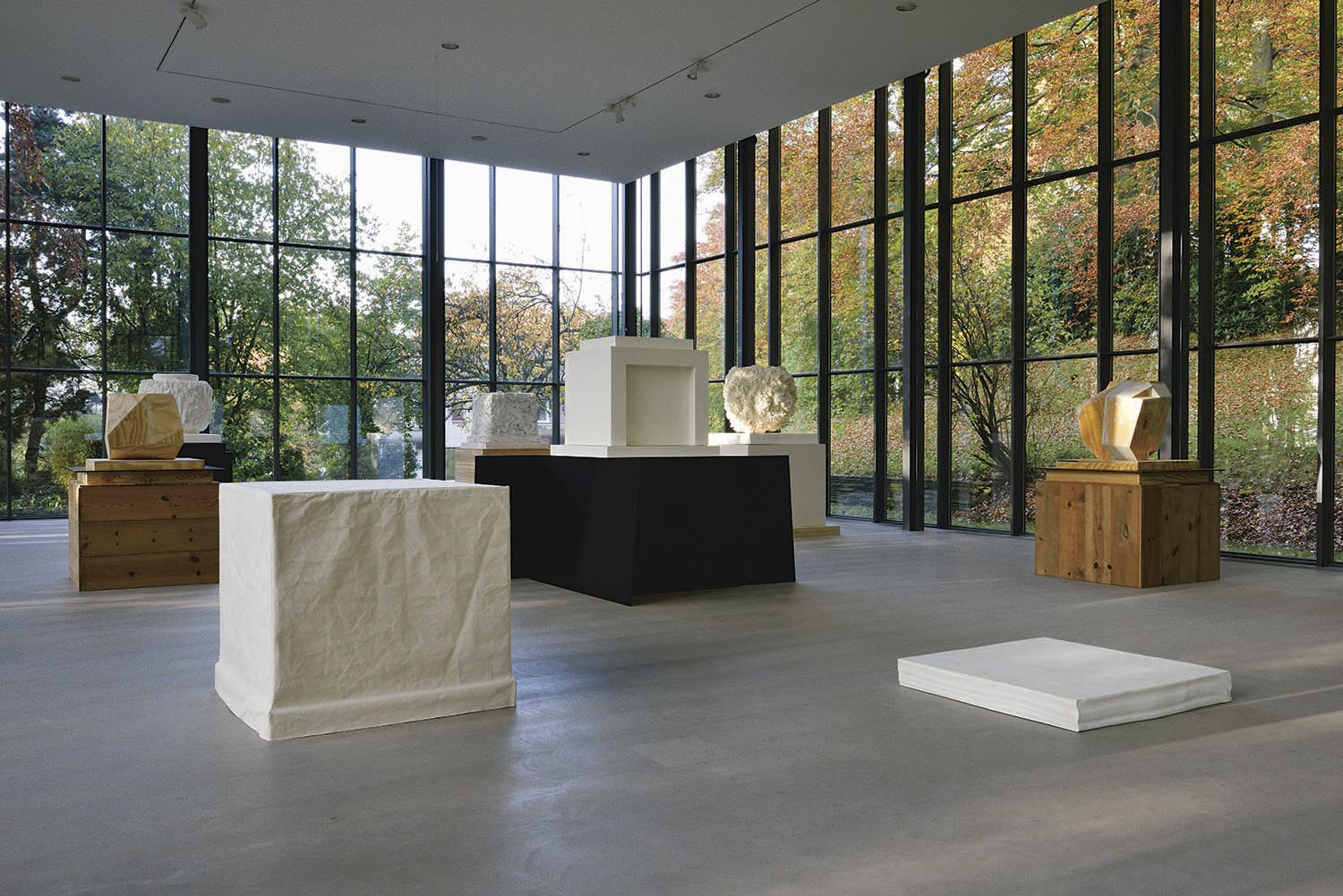
Skulpturenpark Walfrieden, Wuppertal, 2012

- 1974 Galerie Delta, Brussels
- 1976 Galerie Albert Baronian, Brussels; Galleria Massimo Minini, Brescia
- 1977 Galerie Maier Hahn, Düsseldorf, Germany
- 1979 814 Spring Street, Los Angeles; 11 rue Clavel, Paris
- 1980 Vereniging voor het Museum van Hedendaagse Kunst, Gent
- 1981 Galleria Massimo Minini, Brescia
- 1982 Galerie Micheline Szwajcer, Antwerpen
- 1983 Galerie Eric Fabre, Paris
- 1984 Artist Space, New York (exhibition catalogue); Galerie Micheline Szwajcer, Antwerpen
- 1985 Galerie Pietro Sparta, Chagny (exhibition catalogue)
- 1987 Galerie Art & Project, Amsterdam; Palais des Beaux-Arts, Brussels & Villa Arson, Nice (exhibition catalogue)
- 1988 Galleria Massimo Minini, Brescia, Italy; Le Consortium, Dijon, France
- 1990 Donald Young Gallery, Chicago; Bonnefantenmuseum, Maastricht, NL (exhibition catalogue)
- 1991 Centre d'Art Contemporain du Domaine de Kerguéhennec, Bignan (exhibition catalogue); Galerie Micheline Szwajcer, Antwerpen
- 1992 Galerie Jean Bernier, Athens, Greece; Galerie Ghislaine Hussenot, Paris
- 1993 Museum Haus Lange, Museum Haus Esters, Krefeld, Germany (exhibition catalogue)
- 1995 Kusthalle Zürich (exhibition catalogue); Galerie Nationale du Jeu de Paume, Paris (exhibition catalogue); XLIVe Biennale di Venezia, Belgian pavilion (exhibition catalogue)
- 1998 La Criée, Centre d'art contemporain, Rennes, France
- 2000 Galerie Nächst St. Stephan, Wien, Austria; Galerie Xavier Hufkens, Brussels
- 2002 Galerie Massimo Minini, Brescia
- 2003 Collection de Solides, Van Abbemuseum, Eindhoven, NL (exhibition catalogue)
- 2005-2006 Solides géométriques – Photoreliefs – Vues d’atelier, Musée Bourdelle, Paris (exhibition catalogue)
- 2009 Galerie Greta Meert, Brussels
- 2012 Galerie Greta Meert, Brussels Sculptures 1974 – 1995; Musée Dhont – Dhaenens, Deurle Sculptures; La Maison Rouge, Paris Didier Vermeiren, Sculptures et Photographies
- 2012-2013 Skulpturen Park, Walfrieden, Wuppertal Didier Vermeiren, Sculptures (exhibition catalogue)
- 2013 Église Saint Philibert, Dijon Étude pour un Monument à Philippe Pot (1996-2012)
- 2016 Galerie Greta Meert, Brussels
- 2017 Construction de distance, Rennes, Frac Bretagne, France
- 2018 Galerie Laurence Bernard, Geneva, Sculptures / Photographies
- 2022 Double exposition, Wiels, Bruxelles.
- 2024 Galerie Pietro Spartá, Chagny, France.

== Group shows (selection) ==
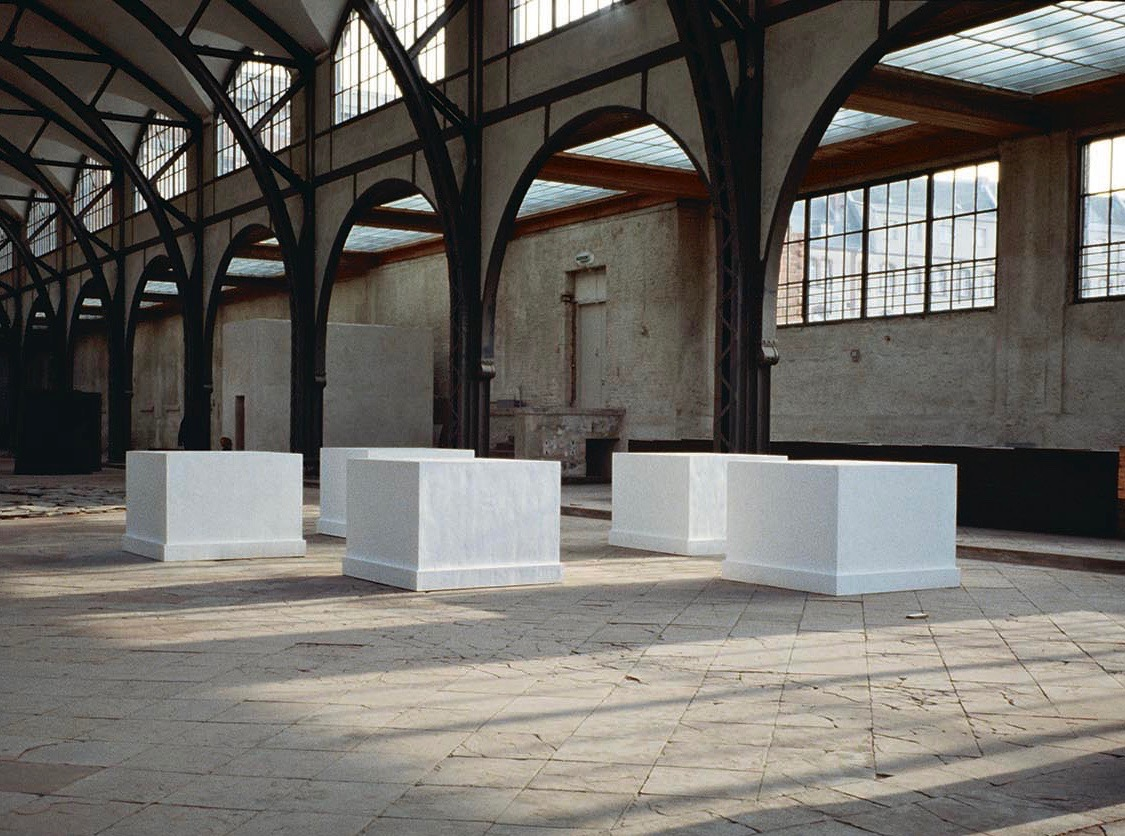
Didier Vermeiren - Zeitlos, Hamburger Bahnhof, Berlin, 1988

- 1984 An International Survey of Recent Painting and Sculpture, Museum of Modern Art, New York, États-Unis (cat., pp. 312–313)
- 1985 Athènes – Site de la création, création d’un site, Dracos Art Center, Athènes, Grèce (cat.). Process und Konstruktion, Munich, Germany (cat.). Museo de Bellas Artes, Buenos Aires, Argentina (cat.). 18e Biennale de São Paulo, São Paulo, Brasil. Van Abbemuseum, Eindhoven, Netherlands (cat.)
- 1987 L’époque, la mode, la morale, la passion, Musée national d’art moderne, Centre Georges Pompidou, Paris, France (cat.)
- 1988 Zeitlos, Hamburger Bahnhof, Berlin, Germany (cat), curator Harald Szeemann
- 1993 GAS-Grandiose Ambitieuse Silencieuce, CapcMusée d’art contemporain, Bordeaux, France (cat.), curator Harald Szeemann
- 1996 Passions privées, Musée d’art moderne de la ville, Paris, France (cat.)
- 1997 L’empreinte, Musée national d’art moderne, Centre Georges Pompidou, Paris, France (cat.)
- 2001 La sculpture contemporaine au jardin des Tuileries, Jardin des Tuileries, Paris, France (cat.)
- 2005 La sculpture dans l’espace. Rodin, Brancusi, Giacometti..., Musée Rodin, Paris, France (cat.)
- 2007 Drawing on Sculpture : Graphic Interventions on the Photographic Surface, Henry Moore Institute, Leeds, United-Kingdom
- 2013 Quaranttanni d’arte contemporanea, Massimo Minini, 1973-2013, Triennale di Milano, Italy
- 2016 Almanach 16, Le Consortium, Dijon, France
- 2017 Rodin, L'Exposition du centenaire, Grand Palais, Paris
- 2019 - 2021 Distance Extended / 1979 - 1997, Herbert Foundation, Gand

== Filmography ==
- 123 plans sur la sculpture de Didier Vermeiren, directed and produced by Elsa Cayo, Tri Films, Paris, 16 mm, 26 min, color, 1988
- Obstacle au mouvement, Didier Vermeiren, sculptures et photographies, directed and produced by Elsa Cayo, Tri Films, Paris, 35 mm, 15 min, b&w, 1999

== Publications ==
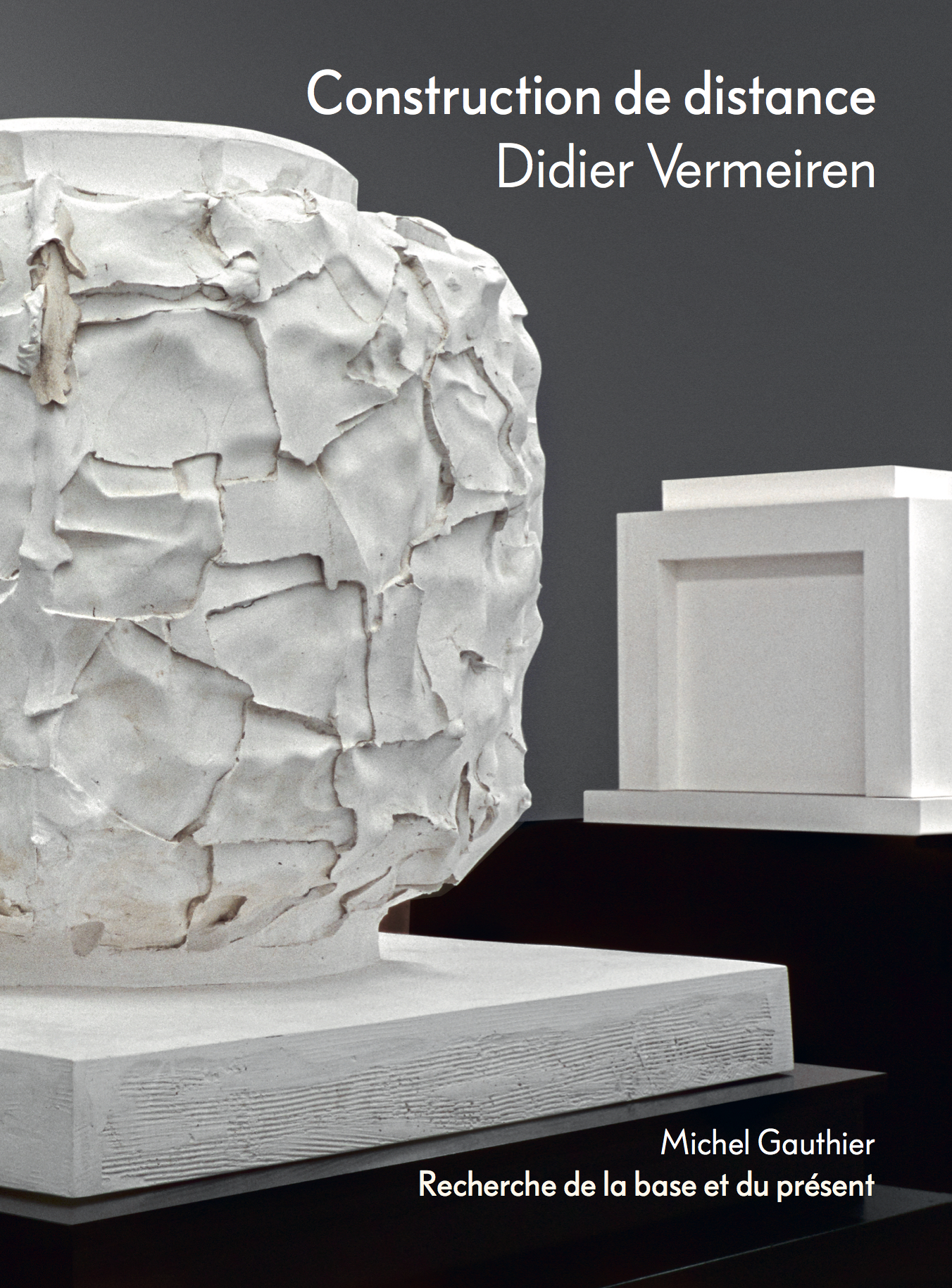
Construction de distance, ed. Frac Bretagne, Rennes, 2017

- Didier Vermeiren : Sculptures, Pietro Sparta & Pascale Petit, Chagny, 1985
- Didier Vermeiren, Société des Expositions du Palais des beaux-arts, Brussels, Villa Arson, Nice, 1987
- Didier Vermeiren : Sculpture, tirage de série (ensemble de cinq épreuves) plâtre, 1988, socle du musée Rodin, Meudon, supportant l’Appel aux armes, plâtre, 1912, Le Consortium, Dijon, 1989
- Didier Vermeiren, Photographies d’expositions, Bonnefantenmuseum, Maastricht, 1990
- Didier Vermeiren, Centre d’art contemporain du Domaine de Kerguéhennec, Bignan, 1992
- Didier Vermeiren, Haus Lange, Haus Esters, Krefeld, 1993
- Didier Vermeiren : sculptures, photographies : XLVIe Biennale de Venise, 1995, Communauté française de Belgique, Bruxelles, 1995
- Didier Vermeiren, Kunsthalle, Zürich, Galerie Nationale du Jeu de Paume, Paris, 1995
- Didier Vermeiren : Collection de solides, Van Abbemuseum, Eindhoven, 2003
- Didier Vermeiren : Solides géométriques – Vues d’atelier, Musée Bourdelle, Paris, 2005
- Didier Vermeiren : Skulpturen, éd. Skulpturenpark Waldfrieden, Wuppertal, 2012
- Didier Vermeiren : Construction de distance, Frac Bretagne, 2017

== Bibliography ==
- Thierry de Duve, "Didier Vermeiren" in + - 0 n°15, p. 30-31, 1976
- Thierry de Duve, "Didier Vermeiren" in Parachute n°7, p. 30-31, 1977
- Christian Besson, "Didier Vermeiren" in Alibis, Musée national d’art moderne, Centre Georges Pompidou, Paris, 1984
- Christian Besson, «Didier Vermeiren» in artpress n° 95, p. 61, 1985
- Michel Assenmaker, "La sculpture", in Didier Vermeiren : sculptures, Pietro Sparta & Pascale Petit, Chagny, 1985
- Joseph Mouton, "La beauté austère de Didier Vermeiren" in art press n°120, p. 68, 1987
- Michel Assenmaker, "De la photographie à la sculpture chez Didier Vermeiren : éléments de lecture" in Didier Vermeiren, Société des Expositions du Palais des beaux-arts, Bruxelles; Villa Arson, Nice, 1987
- Erica Overmeer, Moritz Küng, "Didier Vermeiren" in Forum 04, 1988
- James Yood, "Didier Vermeiren" in Artforum international vol. 29 n°2, 1990
- Moritz Küng, "De Sculptura" in Kunst & Museumjournaal vol. 2, n°4, p. 51-52, 1992
- Jean-Pierre Criqui, "Six Remarks on the Sculpture of Didier Vermeiren" in Didier Vermeiren, Centre d’art contemporain du Domaine de Kerguéhennec, Bignan, 1992
- Julian Heynen, "Didier Vermeiren : je travaille sur la présence" in Didier Vermeiren, Haus Lange, Haus Esters, Krefeld, 1993
- Julian Heynen, "Skulpturen und alle Körper" in Didier Vermeiren, Haus Lange, Haus Esters, Krefeld, 1993
- Dominic Van den Boogerd, "On Rodin, Memory, and the Sculpture of Didier Vermeiren" in Sculptures, Open Air Museum of Sculpture, Middelheim Museum, Anvers, 1993
- Harald Szeemann, "Didier Vermeiren" in GAS-Grandiose Ambitieuse Silencieuce, CapcMusée d’art contemporain, Bordeaux, 1993
- Jean-Pierre Criqui, "Didier Vermeiren" in Artforum international vol.31 n°6, 1993
- Michel Gauthier, "Transferts (sur les «répliques» de socles dans la sculpture de Didier Vermeiren)" in Les Cahiers du Musée national d'art moderne n°47, p. 117-131, 1994
- Simon Duran, "La désorientation de l’espace et le projet de sculpture de Didier Vermeiren" in Didier Vermeiren, Kusthalle, Zürich & Galerie nationale du Jeu de Paume, Paris (text in German and French), 1995
- Jean-Pierre Criqui, "Sans titre, 1994" in Didier Vermeiren, Kunsthalle, Zürich; Galerie Nationale du Jeu de Paume, Paris (text in German and French), 1995
- Michel Gauthier, "Didier Vermeiren : des hommes qui marchent" in Art présence n°26, p. 24-31 (entretien), 1998
- Jean-Pierre Criqui "A brief tour of Collection de Solides", in Didier Vermeiren : collection de solides, Van Abbemuseum, Eindhoven (text nl./engl.), 2003
- Dominic Van den Boogerd "Caryatid by moonlight", in Didier Vermeiren : collection de solides, Van Abbemuseum, Eindhoven (text nl./engl.), 2003
- Paul Ardenne, "Didier Vermeiren" in artpress n°318, p. 82-83, 2005
- Erik Verhagen, "Endogenous / Exogenous. Didier Vermeiren's Dangling signs" in Didier Vermeiren : Solides géométriques – Vues d’atelier, Musée Bourdelle, Paris (text in French and English), 2005
- Jon Wood, "The Studio Boxes of Didier Vermeiren" in Didier Vermeiren, Lenticular Photographs, Los Angeles Studio, 2007, Lapis Press, Los Angeles, 2009
- Erik Verhagen, "Didier Vermeiren, Much More than a Minimalist", in artpress n°392, June 2012.
- Charles Robb, "Permanent shift : the topology of Didier Vermeiren's Cariatide à la Pierre" in Photography and Fictions : locating dynamics of practice : Queensland Festival of Photography 5 Conference, Brisbane, April 2014, Queensland University of Technology, Griffi University and Queensland Centre for Photography, Brisbane, 2012
- Simon Duran "Sculptures" in Didier Vermeiren, Skulpturenpark Waldfrieden, Wuppertal (text in French, English and German), 2012
- Bernard Marcelis, "Didier Vermeiren, Construction de distance", art press n°443, April 2017
- Michel Gauthier "Looking for the Base and the Present" in Didier Vermeiren : Construction de distance, Frac Bretagne, Rennes (text in French and English), 2017
