= Life Without Buildings =

Scottish indie rock band

- Origin: Glasgow, Scotland
- Genres: Indie rock, post-punk, math rock, art rock
- Years active: 1999–2002; 2026–present
- Labels: Tugboat Records, DCBaltimore2012, Gargleblast Records, Absolutely Kosher Records
- Past members: Will Bradley; Chris Evans; Robert Johnston; Sue Tompkins

Life Without Buildings are a Scottish indie rock band formed in Glasgow in 1999. The band consists of Sue Tompkins (vocals), Robert Johnston (guitar), Chris Evans (bass) and Will Bradley (drums). The band existed for three years between 1999 and 2002, releasing one studio album, Any Other City, in 2001, before breaking up the following year. A live album, Live at the Annandale Hotel, was released in 2007.

In January 2026, the band announced plans to reunite after twenty-four years of inactivity.

== Career ==
=== 1999-2002: Formation and Any Other City ===
Named after a track by English new wave band Japan, Life Without Buildings formed during the summer of 1999. The band consisted mostly of ex-students of the Glasgow School of Art, Initial band members were Will Bradley (drums), Chris Evans (bass) and Robert Johnston (guitar). Painter Sue Tompkins (vocals) joined later in 1999. The band split writing duties, with Johnston, Bradley and Evans writing the music while Tompkins wrote the vocals. Tompkins' "talk-sung" vocal styling eventually became the band's most famous attribute. Impressed after their first London gig, the Rough Trade-affiliated Tugboat label asked the band to record a debut single.

Released in March 2000, "The Leanover" b/w "New Town" secured the band a full deal with the label. "New Town" received some airplay on BBC Radio 1. The band later released two more singles on the Tugboat label. The band's debut, Any Other City, recorded by Scottish producer Andy Miller at Chem19 Studios in Glasgow, was released in 2001 in the UK; label DCBaltimore2012 issued it months later in the United States.

Life Without Buildings were on the same bill as The Strokes in February 2001, during the latter band's first headlining gig. A popular legend sprung up that due to the Strokes' popularity, Life Without Buildings was bumped further down the bill. Band members disputed this, saying that while they had been scheduled to play the show, it was the result of a booking error, not anything intentional.

In January 2002 Any Other City debuted at #49 on the CMJ Radio 200. It stayed on the Radio 200 for eight weeks, peaking at #22.

=== 2002–2025: Break-up–and aftermath ===
The band broke up in 2002, after the release of Any Other City. In a 2009 interview with Muso's Guide, guitarist Johnston stated the band broke up because Tompkins wanted to focus on her career as a visual artist. He went on to stress that none of the band members ever envisioned turning music into a career, and they felt pressure because something that had started "for a laugh" had become serious.

In May 2007 a live album was released in Europe called Live at the Annandale Hotel on the Gargleblast Records label, and was subsequently released in North America in August 2007 on Absolutely Kosher Records. Recorded around December 2001 at Sydney's Annandale Hotel, band members claimed to be unaware that the show was recorded, but were happy with the finished live record.

As of 2009, the band had stated no desire to either re-form or play one-off shows. Johnston went on to work as a graphic designer, Bradley became a writer, while Evans and Tompkins work as visual artists.

Any Other City was reissued on vinyl in the United States for the first time on April 19, 2014 for Record Store Day. The vinyl reissue included a reproduction of their debut 7", featuring rougher original versions of "The Leanover" and "New Town".

=== 2025–present: Reunion ===
In 2025, Errol's Hot Wax re-released the band's last single, "Love Trinity". Originally produced by Trifekta Records to promote shows in Australia, the song had "slipped through the cracks a bit,” according to guitarist Robert Dallas Gray. It was the last song recorded by the band and one of the last they wrote. A live version was included on Live at the Annandale Hotel, but the studio recording remained a rarity. The 2025 release was a limited run of 500 single-sided pressings on 7" vinyl. Sue Tompkins hand-wrote lyrics on the blank reverse side.

On 13 January 2026, it was announced that the band would re-form for a show in November 2026 at London's KOKO as part of a programme of commemorative activity to mark fifty years since Rough Trade opened its first record store. This news was followed by an additional show announcement at Glasgow's Saint Luke's.

In October 2026, Errol's Hot Wax released a 12" vinyl pressing called XFM Sessions. Its seven songs, all acoustic, were recorded in 2000 and 2001 for John Kennedy's XFM show.

== Discography ==
=== Studio albums ===
- Any Other City (2001)

=== Live albums ===
- Live at the Annandale Hotel (2007)

=== EP ===
- XFM Sessions (2026)

=== Singles ===
The band released three singles on Tugboat Records and one on Trifekta Records:

- "The Leanover" / "New Town" (2000) (Double A Side)
- "Is Is and the IRS" / "Lets Get Out (New Version)" (2000) (Double A Side)
- "Young Offenders" / "Daylighting" (Double A Side)
- "Love Trinity" / "Is Is and the IRS" / "Daylighting" (Australia only)
- "Love Trinity" (Errol's Hot Wax, single-sided 7", 2025)
