= Anami Schrijvers =

Dutch visual artist and filmmaker

Anami Schrijvers (Oost-Maarland, 1984) is a Dutch visual artist and filmmaker.

== Biography ==
Schrijvers grew up in Limburg, the Netherlands.

He studied Fine Arts at the Gerrit Rietveld Academie and completed a post-academic artist residency at De Ateliers in Amsterdam.

== Work ==
His work includes sculptural projects, installations, and film productions and has been presented in institutions such as P/////AKT, W139, B32, puntwg, All is Giving, Galerie Gabriel Rolt and the Codicil Screenings program. He has participated in international group exhibitions, and curated the art exhibition speak, memory in 2019.

For the 2025 film production White Poplar, Schrijvers collaborated with production company and distributor Video Power. The work was included in the SEE NL catalog and premiered at Shortcutz Amsterdam. White Poplar elaborates on the layers and architecture of an internal dialogue. The narrative touches upon the vulnerability of minors to abuse, utilising stylistic abstraction to portray internal psychological perspectives.
