= Chris Evans (artist) =

British artist

Chris Evans is an English artist based in London and a tutor at De Ateliers in Amsterdam. He is the bassist for the band Life Without Buildings.

== Biography ==
Evans was born in Eastrington, East Riding of Yorkshire in 1967. He studied graphic design at Leicester De Montfort University and completed a Master in Fine Art in 1993 at Winchester School of Art, which was located at their now-defunct annex in Barcelona. Since 2005, and on numerous occasions worldwide, Evans has invited representatives from national police forces to give recruitment presentations at art academies, including at the Pratt Institute, New York (2008), and at the Academy of Fine Arts, Nuremberg (2015). His work is held in various national collections including the Arts Council England, Sculpture International Rotterdam and the Lithuanian Parliament.

== Exhibitions ==
In 2005, Chris Evans participated in the 6th British Art Show and the following year in Eastinternational. Since then, he has exhibited in several international art Biennials: Athens Biennial in 2007, Taipei Biennial in 2010 and Liverpool Biennial in 2014. He has had numerous solo exhibitions, including: Praxes Centre for Contemporary Art, Berlin (2015); Markus Lüttgen, Cologne (2015); Project Arts Centre, Dublin, Ireland (2014); The Gardens, Vilnius (2014); Piper Keys, London (2014); Juliette Jongma (2012); Lüttgenmeijer, Berlin (2011); Marres, Maastricht (2010); British School in Rome (2008); Artpace, San Antonio (2007); STORE, London (2007); Stedelijk Museum Bureau Amsterdam (2006); and Studio Voltaire, London, (2006).

== Books ==
- ‘Goofy Audit’, published by Sternberg Press, 2011
- ‘Collected Filmscripts’, published by Institute of Contemporary Arts, London, 2010 [7]
- ‘Militant Bourgeois’ Published by Stedelijk Museum Bureau Amsterdam; Black Diamond Press, NY & International Project Space, Birmingham, 2007 [8]
- ‘Magnetic Promenade (and other sculpture parks)’, published by Studio Voltaire, London, 2006 [9]
- ‘Radical Loyalty’, Published by City Projects, London; Art Museum of Estonia; Peacock Visual Arts, Aberdeen, 2005
