= Sue Tompkins =

British visual and sound artist

- Born: 1971 (age 54–55); Leighton Buzzard, Bedfordshire, England
- Occupations: Visual artist; singer; songwriter
- Relatives: Hayley Tompkins (sister)
- Musical career
- Instrument: Vocals
- Years active: 1999–2002; 2026–present
- Formerly of: Life Without Buildings

Susan Elizabeth Tompkins is an English visual and sound artist and was the vocalist for indie rock band Life Without Buildings.

== Biography ==
Tompkins was born in Leighton Buzzard, Bedfordshire in 1971. She studied painting at the Glasgow School of Art, and graduated in 1994. Since 1997 she has worked collaboratively with the collective Elizabeth Go (Victoria Morton, Sarah Tripp, Hayley Tompkins and Cathy Wilkes). She has held multiple exhibitions at The Modern Institute.

Tompkins also provided the vocals for art rock band Life Without Buildings, along with other students of the Glasgow School of Art. Spin magazine described Tompkins' vocals as "nervously chirped evocative phrases" and credited her as the band's central attraction. Following their debut album Any Other City in 2001, the band split up. In 2026, she provided guest vocals on the Sleaford Mods album The Demise of Planet X.

== Personal life ==
Tompkins lives and works in Glasgow.

Her twin sister is the artist Hayley Tompkins.

== Exhibitions ==
- The Showroom, London (solo, 31 October - 9 December 2007)
- 'Bare Words', Lautom Contemporary, Oslo (group, October 2007)
- 'in the poem about love you don't write the word love', installation and live performance, Overgaden, Copenhagen (November, 2007)
- Sue Tompkins, Inverleith House, Royal Botanic Garden Edinburgh, (solo, 27 February - 24 April 2011)
- 'Expressions', The Modern Institute, Glasgow, (solo, 7 September - 2 November 2013)
- 'When Wayne Went Away', Lisa Cooley, New York, (solo, 21 February - 27 March 2016)
