= Varda Caivano =

Argentinian artist

Varda Caivano (born 1971) is an Argentinian artist who lives and works in London, England.

Born in Buenos Aires, Caivano graduated Goldsmiths University, London in the early 2000s, having previously studied biology and art history at the University of Buenos Aires. She received a master's degree in art from the Royal College of Art, London, in 2004.

Her work is included in the Zabludowicz Collection and the Arts Council Collection, United Kingdom.
