= Dutch TT =

Motorcycle race held in the Netherlands

Coordinates: 52°57′42″N 6°31′24″E

Grand Prix motorcycle racing
- Venue: TT Circuit Assen (1949–2019, 2021–present)
- First race: 1949
- Most wins (rider): Ángel Nieto (15)
- Most wins (manufacturer): Honda (67)

The Dutch Tourist Trophy, also known as the TT Assen, and also sometimes known as the Dutch Motorcycle Grand Prix, is an annual Dutch motorsport event established in 1925 for road racing motorcycles held on the TT Circuit Assen, also known as the ‘Cathedral of Speed'. The event attained world championship status in 1949 when it was sanctioned by the FIM as part of the inaugural Grand Prix motorcycle racing world championship season, making it the oldest event on the MotoGP calendar. The venue holds the record for being the only circuit to have hosted a motorcycle Grand Prix event every year since the series was created in 1949, with the exception of 2020 when the race was cancelled due to the outbreak of COVID-19.

The event is due to take place at the TT Circuit Assen until at least 2031.

== Race history ==
After the Dutch government relaxed laws allowing the motorsport racing on public roads, the Assen & Omstreken motorcycle club organized and held the first Dutch TT on July 11, 1925. Since then the event has taken place every year with the exception of the years 1940 to 1945, because of the Second World War, and 2020, due to the COVID-19 pandemic.

The 1925 races were held on a 28.4 km (17.6 mi) street circuit in the shape of a triangle between the towns of Borger, Schoonloo and Grolloo. From 1926 to 1955, the races were held on a 16.536 km (10.275 mi) rectangular shaped street circuit through the towns of De Haar, Hooghalen, Laaghalen and Laaghalerveen. In 1955, a new 7.705 km (4.788 mi) circuit was created which still used public roads but, more closely resembled a modern race track. In 1992, the race track became a permanent enclosed circuit.

The races were traditionally held on the last Saturday of June however, from 2016 onwards it has been held on Sunday of the last weekend of June, bringing it in line with all other MotoGP races.

== Official names and sponsors ==
- 1949–1957, 1959–1971: Grote Prijs van Nederland der K.N.M.V. (no official sponsor)
- 1972, 1981–1985, 1992: Dutch TT Assen (no official sponsor)
- 1973–1977: Dutch TT Assen/Grote Prijs van Nederland der KNMV (no official sponsor)
- 1978–1980, 1986–1991: Dutch TT (no official sponsor)
- 1993–1997: Lucky Strike Dutch Grand Prix
- 1998–2000: Rizla+ Dutch TT
- 2001–2003: Gauloises Dutch TT
- 2004–2005: Gauloises TT Assen
- 2006–2008: A-Style TT Assen
- 2009: Alice TT Assen
- 2010: TIM TT Assen
- 2011–2013: Iveco TT Assen
- 2014: Iveco Daily TT Assen
- 2015–2019, 2021–2024: Motul TT Assen
- 2025: Motul Grand Prix of the Netherlands
- 2026: Tissot Grand Prix of the Netherlands

== Spectator attendance ==
2007: 91,429
2013: 90,000
2016–2019: 105,000

== Winners ==
=== Multiple winners (riders) ===
# Wins	Country	Wins	
# Wins	Country	Category	Years won
15	(Spain) Ángel Nieto	125cc	1971, 1972, 1977, 1979, 1980, 1981, 1982, 1983, 1984
15	(Spain) Ángel Nieto	50cc	1970, 1971, 1972, 1975, 1976, 1977
14	(Italy) Giacomo Agostini	500cc	1968, 1969, 1970, 1971, 1972, 1974
14	(Italy) Giacomo Agostini	350cc	1968, 1969, 1970, 1971, 1972, 1973, 1974, 1976
10	(Italy) Valentino Rossi	MotoGP	2002, 2004, 2005, 2007, 2009, 2013, 2015, 2017
10	(Italy) Valentino Rossi	250cc	1998
10	(Italy) Valentino Rossi	125cc	1997
9	(Rhodesia) Jim Redman	500cc	1966
9	(Rhodesia) Jim Redman	350cc	1962, 1963, 1964, 1965
9	(Rhodesia) Jim Redman	250cc	1962, 1963, 1964
9	(Rhodesia) Jim Redman	125cc	1964
9	(United Kingdom) Mike Hailwood	500cc	1962, 1964, 1965, 1967
9	(United Kingdom) Mike Hailwood	350cc	1966, 1967
9	(United Kingdom) Mike Hailwood	250cc	1961, 1966, 1967
7	(Italy) Carlo Ubbiali	250cc	1956, 1960
7	(Italy) Carlo Ubbiali	125cc	1955, 1956, 1958, 1959, 1960
6	(United Kingdom) John Surtees	500cc	1956, 1957, 1958, 1959
6	(United Kingdom) John Surtees	350cc	1958, 1960
6	(Spain) Marc Márquez	MotoGP	2014, 2018, 2025
6	(Spain) Marc Márquez	Moto2	2011, 2012
6	(Spain) Marc Márquez	125cc	2010
5	(United Kingdom) Geoff Duke	500cc	1951, 1953, 1954, 1955
5	(United Kingdom) Geoff Duke	350cc	1952
5	(United Kingdom) Phil Read	500cc	1973
5	(United Kingdom) Phil Read	250cc	1965, 1971
5	(United Kingdom) Phil Read	125cc	1967, 1968
5	(Italy) Eugenio Lazzarini	125cc	1973, 1978
5	(Italy) Eugenio Lazzarini	50cc	1978, 1979, 1983
5	(Spain) Jorge Martínez	125cc	1988
5	(Spain) Jorge Martínez	80cc	1984, 1986, 1987, 1988
5	(Australia) Mick Doohan	500cc	1994, 1995, 1996, 1997, 1998
5	(Italy) Francesco Bagnaia	MotoGP	2022, 2023, 2024
5	(Italy) Francesco Bagnaia	Moto2	2018
5	(Italy) Francesco Bagnaia	Moto3	2016
4	(Italy) Tarquinio Provini	250cc	1957, 1958, 1959
4	(Italy) Tarquinio Provini	125cc	1957
4	(Venezuela) Carlos Lavado	250cc	1980, 1983, 1984, 1986
4	(West Germany) Anton Mang	350cc	1981
4	(West Germany) Anton Mang	250cc	1981, 1982, 1987
4	(Spain) Jorge Lorenzo	MotoGP	2010
4	(Spain) Jorge Lorenzo	250cc	2006, 2007
4	(Spain) Jorge Lorenzo	125cc	2004
3	(West Germany) Werner Haas	250cc	1953, 1954
3	(West Germany) Werner Haas	125cc	1953
3	(Switzerland) Luigi Taveri	250cc	1955
3	(Switzerland) Luigi Taveri	125cc	1962
3	(Switzerland) Luigi Taveri	50cc	1966
3	(West Germany) Dieter Braun	350cc	1975
3	(West Germany) Dieter Braun	250cc	1972
3	(West Germany) Dieter Braun	125cc	1970
3	(Italy) Walter Villa	250cc	1974, 1975, 1976
3	(Italy) Pier Paolo Bianchi	125cc	1975, 1976, 1985
3	(United States) Kevin Schwantz	500cc	1990, 1991, 1993
3	(Italy) Max Biaggi	500cc	2001
3	(Italy) Max Biaggi	250cc	1994, 1995
3	(Spain) Maverick Viñales	MotoGP	2019
3	(Spain) Maverick Viñales	Moto3	2012
3	(Spain) Maverick Viñales	125cc	2011
2	(Italy) Nello Pagani	500cc	1949
2	(Italy) Nello Pagani	125cc	1949
2	(Italy) Umberto Masetti	500cc	1950, 1952
2	(Italy) Enrico Lorenzetti	350cc	1953
2	(Italy) Enrico Lorenzetti	250cc	1952
2	(Federation of Rhodesia and Nyasaland) Gary Hocking	500cc	1961
2	(Federation of Rhodesia and Nyasaland) Gary Hocking	350cc	1961
2	(West Germany) Ernst Degner	50cc	1962, 1963
2	(United Kingdom) Ralph Bryans	50cc	1964, 1965
2	(United Kingdom) Bill Ivy	250cc	1968
2	(United Kingdom) Bill Ivy	125cc	1966
2	(United Kingdom) Rodney Gould	250cc	1970, 1972
2	(Switzerland) Bruno Kneubühler	125cc	1974
2	(Switzerland) Bruno Kneubühler	50cc	1973
2	(United Kingdom) Barry Sheene	500cc	1975, 1976
2	(South Africa) Kork Ballington	350cc	1977, 1978
2	(Spain) Ricardo Tormo	50cc	1980, 1981
2	(United States) Kenny Roberts	500cc	1983
2	(United States) Kenny Roberts	250cc	1978
2	(United States) Randy Mamola	500cc	1984, 1985
2	(Australia) Wayne Gardner	500cc	1986, 1988
2	(Italy) Pierfrancesco Chili	250cc	1991, 1992
2	(Germany) Dirk Raudies	125cc	1993, 1995
2	(Germany) Ralf Waldmann	250cc	1996
2	(Germany) Ralf Waldmann	125cc	1991
2	(Italy) Loris Capirossi	250cc	1993, 1999
2	(Italy) Marco Melandri	250cc	2002
2	(Italy) Marco Melandri	125cc	1998
2	(Argentina) Sebastián Porto	250cc	2004, 2005
2	(Hungary) Gábor Talmácsi	125cc	2005, 2008
2	(Australia) Casey Stoner	MotoGP	2008, 2012
2	(Australia) Anthony West	Moto2	2014
2	(Australia) Anthony West	250cc	2003
2	(Spain) Augusto Fernández	Moto2	2019, 2022
2	(Italy) Matteo Ferrari	MotoE	2023 Race 1, 2023 Race 2
2	(Italy) Alessandro Zaccone	MotoE	2024 Race 2, 2025 Race 2
2	(Japan) Ai Ogura	MotoGP	2026
2	(Japan) Ai Ogura	Moto2	2024

=== Multiple winners (manufacturers) ===
# Wins	Manufacturer	Wins	
# Wins	Manufacturer	Category	Years won
67	(Japan) Honda	MotoGP	2002, 2003, 2006, 2012, 2014, 2016, 2018
67	(Japan) Honda	500cc	1966, 1967, 1984, 1985, 1986, 1988, 1992, 1994, 1995, 1996, 1997, 1998, 1999, 2000
67	(Japan) Honda	350cc	1962, 1963, 1964, 1965, 1966, 1967
67	(Japan) Honda	250cc	1961, 1962, 1963, 1964, 1966, 1967, 1985, 1987, 1989, 1993, 1996, 1999, 2000, 2009
67	(Japan) Honda	Moto3	2012, 2014, 2017, 2018, 2019, 2021, 2023
67	(Japan) Honda	125cc	1961, 1962, 1964, 1967, 1989, 1990, 1991, 1992, 1993, 1994, 1995, 1996, 1998, 1999, 2001, 2002
67	(Japan) Honda	50cc	1964, 1965, 1966
40	(Japan) Yamaha	MotoGP	2004, 2005, 2007, 2009, 2010, 2011, 2013, 2015, 2017, 2019, 2021
40	(Japan) Yamaha	500cc	1974, 1978, 1980, 1983, 1987, 1989, 2001
40	(Japan) Yamaha	350cc	1974, 1975, 1976, 1977, 1980
40	(Japan) Yamaha	250cc	1965, 1968, 1970, 1971, 1972, 1973, 1978, 1980, 1983, 1984, 1986, 1988, 1990
40	(Japan) Yamaha	125cc	1965, 1966, 1968, 1974
35	(Italy) MV Agusta	500cc	1956, 1957, 1958, 1959, 1960, 1961, 1962, 1964, 1965, 1968, 1969, 1970, 1971, 1972, 1973
35	(Italy) MV Agusta	350cc	1958, 1960, 1961, 1968, 1969, 1970, 1971, 1972, 1973
35	(Italy) MV Agusta	250cc	1955, 1956, 1958, 1959, 1960
35	(Italy) MV Agusta	125cc	1952, 1955, 1956, 1958, 1959, 1960
21	(Italy) Aprilia	MotoGP	2026
21	(Italy) Aprilia	250cc	1991, 1992, 1994, 1995, 1997, 1998, 2001, 2002, 2003, 2004, 2005, 2006, 2007, 2008
21	(Italy) Aprilia	125cc	1997, 2003, 2007, 2008, 2009, 2011
14	(Spain) Derbi	125cc	1971, 1972, 1988, 2000, 2004, 2010
14	(Spain) Derbi	80cc	1984, 1986, 1987, 1988
14	(Spain) Derbi	50cc	1969, 1970, 1971, 1972
14	(Japan) Suzuki	500cc	1975, 1976, 1977, 1979, 1981, 1982, 1990, 1991, 1993
14	(Japan) Suzuki	125cc	1963, 1970
14	(Japan) Suzuki	50cc	1962, 1963, 1967
11	(Italy) Ducati	MotoGP	2008, 2022, 2023, 2024, 2025
11	(Italy) Ducati	MotoE	2023 Race 1, 2023 Race 2, 2024 Race 1, 2024 Race 2, 2025 Race 1, 2025 Race 2
11	(Germany) Kalex	Moto2	2013, 2015, 2016, 2017, 2018, 2019, 2021, 2022, 2023, 2025, 2026
8	(Japan) Kawasaki	350cc	1978, 1979, 1981, 1982
8	(Japan) Kawasaki	250cc	1977, 1981, 1982
8	(Japan) Kawasaki	125cc	1969
7	(Italy) Gilera	500cc	1949, 1950, 1952, 1953, 1954, 1955, 1963
7	(Austria) KTM	Moto3	2013, 2015, 2024, 2025, 2026
7	(Austria) KTM	125cc	2005, 2006
6	(Italy) Moto Guzzi	350cc	1953, 1954, 1955, 1956, 1957
6	(Italy) Moto Guzzi	250cc	1952
6	(West Germany) Kreidler	50cc	1973, 1974, 1975, 1979, 1980, 1982
6	(Italy) Morbidelli	250cc	1979
6	(Italy) Morbidelli	125cc	1975, 1976, 1978, 1985
6	(Italy) Morbidelli	50cc	1978
6	(Italy) Garelli	125cc	1982, 1983, 1984, 1986, 1987
6	(Italy) Garelli	50cc	1983
5	(Italy) Mondial	250cc	1957
5	(Italy) Mondial	125cc	1949, 1950, 1951, 1957
4	(West Germany) NSU	250cc	1953, 1954
4	(West Germany) NSU	125cc	1953, 1954
4	(Spain) Bultaco	50cc	1976, 1977, 1981
4	(Spain) Bultaco	125cc	1977
3	(United Kingdom) Norton	500cc	1951
3	(United Kingdom) Norton	350cc	1952, 1959
3	(United States) Harley-Davidson	250cc	1974, 1975, 1976
3	(Italy) Minarelli	125cc	1979, 1980, 1981
2	(United Kingdom) Velocette	350cc	1949, 1950
2	(Switzerland) Suter	Moto2	2011, 2012
2	(Italy) Speed Up	Moto2	2010, 2014

=== Winners by season ===
A pink background indicates an event that was not part of the Grand Prix motorcycle racing championship.

Year	Moto3		Moto2		MotoGP		Report
Year	Rider	Manufacturer	Rider	Manufacturer	Rider	Manufacturer	Report
2026	(Spain) Máximo Quiles	KTM	(Colombia) David Alonso	Kalex	(Japan) Ai Ogura	Aprilia	Report

Year	MotoE				Moto3		Moto2		MotoGP		Report
Year	Race 1		Race 2		Moto3		Moto2		MotoGP		Report
Year	Rider	Manufacturer	Rider	Manufacturer	Rider	Manufacturer	Rider	Manufacturer	Rider	Manufacturer	Report
2025	(Italy) Andrea Mantovani	Ducati	(Italy) Alessandro Zaccone	Ducati	(Spain) José Antonio Rueda	KTM	(Brazil) Diogo Moreira	Kalex	(Spain) Marc Márquez	Ducati	Report
2024	(Spain) Héctor Garzó	Ducati	(Italy) Alessandro Zaccone	Ducati	(Spain) Iván Ortolá	KTM	(Japan) Ai Ogura	Boscoscuro	(Italy) Francesco Bagnaia	Ducati	Report
2023	(Italy) Matteo Ferrari	Ducati	(Italy) Matteo Ferrari	Ducati	(Spain) Jaume Masià	Honda	(United Kingdom) Jake Dixon	Kalex	(Italy) Francesco Bagnaia	Ducati	Report
2022	(Switzerland) Dominique Aegerter	Energica	(Brazil) Eric Granado	Energica	(Japan) Ayumu Sasaki	Husqvarna	(Spain) Augusto Fernández	Kalex	(Italy) Francesco Bagnaia	Ducati	Report
2021	(Brazil) Eric Granado	Energica	—N/a		(Italy) Dennis Foggia	Honda	(Spain) Raúl Fernández	Kalex	(France) Fabio Quartararo	Yamaha	Report
2020	Cancelled due to COVID-19 concerns		—N/a		Cancelled due to COVID-19 concerns						

Year	Moto3		Moto2		MotoGP		Report
Year	Rider	Manufacturer	Rider	Manufacturer	Rider	Manufacturer	Report
2019	(Italy) Tony Arbolino	Honda	(Spain) Augusto Fernández	Kalex	(Spain) Maverick Viñales	Yamaha	Report
2018	(Spain) Jorge Martín	Honda	(Italy) Francesco Bagnaia	Kalex	(Spain) Marc Márquez	Honda	Report
2017	(Spain) Arón Canet	Honda	(Italy) Franco Morbidelli	Kalex	(Italy) Valentino Rossi	Yamaha	Report
2016	(Italy) Francesco Bagnaia	Mahindra	(Japan) Takaaki Nakagami	Kalex	(Australia) Jack Miller	Honda	Report
2015	(Portugal) Miguel Oliveira	KTM	(France) Johann Zarco	Kalex	(Italy) Valentino Rossi	Yamaha	Report
2014	(Spain) Álex Márquez	Honda	(Australia) Anthony West	Speed Up	(Spain) Marc Márquez	Honda	Report
2013	(Spain) Luis Salom	KTM	(Spain) Pol Espargaró	Kalex	(Italy) Valentino Rossi	Yamaha	Report
2012	(Spain) Maverick Viñales	Honda	(Spain) Marc Márquez	Suter	(Australia) Casey Stoner	Honda	Report
Year	125cc		Moto2		MotoGP		Report
Year	Rider	Manufacturer	Rider	Manufacturer	Rider	Manufacturer	Report
2011	(Spain) Maverick Viñales	Aprilia	(Spain) Marc Márquez	Suter	(United States) Ben Spies	Yamaha	Report
2010	(Spain) Marc Márquez	Derbi	(Italy) Andrea Iannone	Speed Up	(Spain) Jorge Lorenzo	Yamaha	Report
Year	125cc		250cc		MotoGP		Report
Year	Rider	Manufacturer	Rider	Manufacturer	Rider	Manufacturer	Report
2009	(Spain) Sergio Gadea	Aprilia	(Japan) Hiroshi Aoyama	Honda	(Italy) Valentino Rossi	Yamaha	Report
2008	(Hungary) Gábor Talmácsi	Aprilia	(Spain) Álvaro Bautista	Aprilia	(Australia) Casey Stoner	Ducati	Report
2007	(Italy) Mattia Pasini	Aprilia	(Spain) Jorge Lorenzo	Aprilia	(Italy) Valentino Rossi	Yamaha	Report
2006	(Finland) Mika Kallio	KTM	(Spain) Jorge Lorenzo	Aprilia	(United States) Nicky Hayden	Honda	Report
2005	(Hungary) Gábor Talmácsi	KTM	(Argentina) Sebastián Porto	Aprilia	(Italy) Valentino Rossi	Yamaha	Report
2004	(Spain) Jorge Lorenzo	Derbi	(Argentina) Sebastián Porto	Aprilia	(Italy) Valentino Rossi	Yamaha	Report
2003	(Germany) Steve Jenkner	Aprilia	(Australia) Anthony West	Aprilia	(Spain) Sete Gibernau	Honda	Report
2002	(Spain) Daniel Pedrosa	Honda	(Italy) Marco Melandri	Aprilia	(Italy) Valentino Rossi	Honda	Report
Year	125cc		250cc		500cc		Report
Year	Rider	Manufacturer	Rider	Manufacturer	Rider	Manufacturer	Report
2001	(Spain) Toni Elías	Honda	(United Kingdom) Jeremy McWilliams	Aprilia	(Italy) Max Biaggi	Yamaha	Report
2000	(Japan) Youichi Ui	Derbi	(Japan) Tohru Ukawa	Honda	(Brazil) Alex Barros	Honda	Report
1999	(Japan) Masao Azuma	Honda	(Italy) Loris Capirossi	Honda	(Japan) Tadayuki Okada	Honda	Report
1998	(Italy) Marco Melandri	Honda	(Italy) Valentino Rossi	Aprilia	(Australia) Mick Doohan	Honda	Report
1997	(Italy) Valentino Rossi	Aprilia	(Japan) Tetsuya Harada	Aprilia	(Australia) Mick Doohan	Honda	Report
1996	(Spain) Emilio Alzamora	Honda	(Germany) Ralf Waldmann	Honda	(Australia) Mick Doohan	Honda	Report
1995	(Germany) Dirk Raudies	Honda	(Italy) Max Biaggi	Aprilia	(Australia) Mick Doohan	Honda	Report
1994	(Japan) Takeshi Tsujimura	Honda	(Italy) Max Biaggi	Aprilia	(Australia) Mick Doohan	Honda	Report
1993	(Germany) Dirk Raudies	Honda	(Italy) Loris Capirossi	Honda	(United States) Kevin Schwantz	Suzuki	Report
1992	(Italy) Ezio Gianola	Honda	(Italy) Pierfrancesco Chili	Aprilia	(Spain) Àlex Crivillé	Honda	Report
1991	(Germany) Ralf Waldmann	Honda	(Italy) Pierfrancesco Chili	Aprilia	(United States) Kevin Schwantz	Suzuki	Report
1990	(Italy) Doriano Romboni	Honda	(United States) John Kocinski	Yamaha	(United States) Kevin Schwantz	Suzuki	Report

Year	80cc		125cc		250cc		500cc		Report
Year	Rider	Manufacturer	Rider	Manufacturer	Rider	Manufacturer	Rider	Manufacturer	Report
1989	(West Germany) Peter Öttl	Krauser	(Netherlands) Hans Spaan	Honda	(West Germany) Reinhold Roth	Honda	(United States) Wayne Rainey	Yamaha	Report
1988	(Spain) Jorge Martínez	Derbi	(Spain) Jorge Martínez	Derbi	(Spain) Juan Garriga	Yamaha	(Australia) Wayne Gardner	Honda	Report
1987	(Spain) Jorge Martínez	Derbi	(Italy) Fausto Gresini	Garelli	(West Germany) Anton Mang	Honda	(United States) Eddie Lawson	Yamaha	Report
1986	(Spain) Jorge Martínez	Derbi	(Italy) Luca Cadalora	Garelli	(Venezuela) Carlos Lavado	Yamaha	(Australia) Wayne Gardner	Honda	Report
1985	(Austria) Gerd Kafka	Casal	(Italy) Pier Paolo Bianchi	MBA	(United States) Freddie Spencer	Honda	(United States) Randy Mamola	Honda	Report
1984	(Spain) Jorge Martínez	Derbi	(Spain) Ángel Nieto	Garelli	(Venezuela) Carlos Lavado	Yamaha	(United States) Randy Mamola	Honda	Report
Year	50cc		125cc		250cc		500cc		Report
Year	Rider	Manufacturer	Rider	Manufacturer	Rider	Manufacturer	Rider	Manufacturer	Report
1983	(Italy) Eugenio Lazzarini	Garelli	(Spain) Ángel Nieto	Garelli	(Venezuela) Carlos Lavado	Yamaha	(United States) Kenny Roberts	Yamaha	Report

Year	50cc		125cc		250cc		350cc		500cc		Report
Year	Rider	Manufacturer	Rider	Manufacturer	Rider	Manufacturer	Rider	Manufacturer	Rider	Manufacturer	Report
1982	(Switzerland) Stefan Dörflinger	Kreidler	(Spain) Ángel Nieto	Garelli	(West Germany) Anton Mang	Kawasaki	(France) Jean-François Baldé	Kawasaki	(Italy) Franco Uncini	Suzuki	Report
1981	(Spain) Ricardo Tormo	Bultaco	(Spain) Ángel Nieto	Minarelli	(West Germany) Anton Mang	Kawasaki	(West Germany) Anton Mang	Kawasaki	(Italy) Marco Lucchinelli	Suzuki	Report
1980	(Spain) Ricardo Tormo	Kreidler	(Spain) Ángel Nieto	Minarelli	(Venezuela) Carlos Lavado	Yamaha	(South Africa) Jon Ekerold	Yamaha	(Netherlands) Jack Middelburg	Yamaha	Report
1979	(Italy) Eugenio Lazzarini	Kreidler	(Spain) Ángel Nieto	Minarelli	(Italy) Graziano Rossi	Morbidelli	(Australia) Gregg Hansford	Kawasaki	(Italy) Virginio Ferrari	Suzuki	Report
1978	(Italy) Eugenio Lazzarini	MBA	(Italy) Eugenio Lazzarini	MBA	(United States) Kenny Roberts	Yamaha	(South Africa) Kork Ballington	Kawasaki	(Venezuela) Johnny Cecotto	Yamaha	Report
1977	(Spain) Ángel Nieto	Bultaco	(Spain) Ángel Nieto	Bultaco	(United Kingdom) Mick Grant	Kawasaki	(South Africa) Kork Ballington	Yamaha	(Netherlands) Wil Hartog	Suzuki	Report
1976	(Spain) Ángel Nieto	Bultaco	(Italy) Pier Paolo Bianchi	Morbidelli	(Italy) Walter Villa	Harley Davidson	(Italy) Giacomo Agostini	Yamaha	(United Kingdom) Barry Sheene	Suzuki	Report
1975	(Spain) Ángel Nieto	Kreidler	(Italy) Pier Paolo Bianchi	Morbidelli	(Italy) Walter Villa	Harley Davidson	(West Germany) Dieter Braun	Yamaha	(United Kingdom) Barry Sheene	Suzuki	Report
1974	(West Germany) Herbert Rittberger	Kreidler	(Switzerland) Bruno Kneubühler	Yamaha	(Italy) Walter Villa	Harley Davidson	(Italy) Giacomo Agostini	Yamaha	(Italy) Giacomo Agostini	Yamaha	Report
1973	(Switzerland) Bruno Kneubühler	Kreidler	(Italy) Eugenio Lazzarini	Maico	(West Germany) Dieter Braun	Yamaha	(Italy) Giacomo Agostini	MV Agusta	(United Kingdom) Phil Read	MV Agusta	Report
1972	(Spain) Ángel Nieto	Derbi	(Spain) Ángel Nieto	Derbi	(United Kingdom) Rodney Gould	Yamaha	(Italy) Giacomo Agostini	MV Agusta	(Italy) Giacomo Agostini	MV Agusta	Report
1971	(Spain) Ángel Nieto	Derbi	(Spain) Ángel Nieto	Derbi	(United Kingdom) Phil Read	Yamaha	(Italy) Giacomo Agostini	MV Agusta	(Italy) Giacomo Agostini	MV Agusta	Report
1970	(Spain) Ángel Nieto	Derbi	(West Germany) Dieter Braun	Suzuki	(United Kingdom) Rodney Gould	Yamaha	(Italy) Giacomo Agostini	MV Agusta	(Italy) Giacomo Agostini	MV Agusta	Report
1969	(Australia) Barry Smith	Derbi	(United Kingdom) Dave Simmonds	Kawasaki	(Italy) Renzo Pasolini	Benelli	(Italy) Giacomo Agostini	MV Agusta	(Italy) Giacomo Agostini	MV Agusta	Report
1968	(Netherlands) Paul Lodewijkx	Jamathi	(United Kingdom) Phil Read	Yamaha	(United Kingdom) Bill Ivy	Yamaha	(Italy) Giacomo Agostini	MV Agusta	(Italy) Giacomo Agostini	MV Agusta	Report
1967	(Japan) Yoshimi Katayama	Suzuki	(United Kingdom) Phil Read	Honda	(United Kingdom) Mike Hailwood	Honda	(United Kingdom) Mike Hailwood	Honda	(United Kingdom) Mike Hailwood	Honda	Report
1966	(Switzerland) Luigi Taveri	Honda	(United Kingdom) Bill Ivy	Yamaha	(United Kingdom) Mike Hailwood	Honda	(United Kingdom) Mike Hailwood	Honda	(Rhodesia) Jim Redman	Honda	Report
1965	(United Kingdom) Ralph Bryans	Honda	(Canada) Mike Duff	Yamaha	(United Kingdom) Phil Read	Yamaha	(Rhodesia) Jim Redman	Honda	(United Kingdom) Mike Hailwood	MV Agusta	Report
1964	(United Kingdom) Ralph Bryans	Honda	(Rhodesia) Jim Redman	Honda	(Rhodesia) Jim Redman	Honda	(Rhodesia) Jim Redman	Honda	(United Kingdom) Mike Hailwood	MV Agusta	Report
1963	(West Germany) Ernst Degner	Suzuki	(New Zealand) Hugh Anderson	Suzuki	(Federation of Rhodesia and Nyasaland) Jim Redman	Honda	(Federation of Rhodesia and Nyasaland) Jim Redman	Honda	(United Kingdom) John Hartle	Gilera	Report
1962	(West Germany) Ernst Degner	Suzuki	(Switzerland) Luigi Taveri	Honda	(Federation of Rhodesia and Nyasaland) Jim Redman	Honda	(Federation of Rhodesia and Nyasaland) Jim Redman	Honda	(United Kingdom) Mike Hailwood	MV Agusta	Report

Year	125cc		250cc		350cc		500cc		Report
Year	Rider	Manufacturer	Rider	Manufacturer	Rider	Manufacturer	Rider	Manufacturer	Report
1961	(Australia) Tom Phillis	Honda	(United Kingdom) Mike Hailwood	Honda	(Federation of Rhodesia and Nyasaland) Gary Hocking	MV Agusta	(Federation of Rhodesia and Nyasaland) Gary Hocking	MV Agusta	Report
1960	(Italy) Carlo Ubbiali	MV Agusta	(Italy) Carlo Ubbiali	MV Agusta	(United Kingdom) John Surtees	MV Agusta	(Italy) Remo Venturi	MV Agusta	Report
1959	(Italy) Carlo Ubbiali	MV Agusta	(Italy) Tarquinio Provini	MV Agusta	(Australia) Bob Brown	Norton	(United Kingdom) John Surtees	MV Agusta	Report
1958	(Italy) Carlo Ubbiali	MV Agusta	(Italy) Tarquinio Provini	MV Agusta	(United Kingdom) John Surtees	MV Agusta	(United Kingdom) John Surtees	MV Agusta	Report
1957	(Italy) Tarquinio Provini	Mondial	(Italy) Tarquinio Provini	Mondial	(Australia) Keith Campbell	Moto Guzzi	(United Kingdom) John Surtees	MV Agusta	Report
1956	(Italy) Carlo Ubbiali	MV Agusta	(Italy) Carlo Ubbiali	MV Agusta	(United Kingdom) Bill Lomas	Moto Guzzi	(United Kingdom) John Surtees	MV Agusta	Report
1955	(Italy) Carlo Ubbiali	MV Agusta	(Switzerland) Luigi Taveri	MV Agusta	(Australia) Ken Kavanagh	Moto Guzzi	(United Kingdom) Geoff Duke	Gilera	Report
1954	(Austria) Rupert Hollaus	NSU	(West Germany) Werner Haas	NSU	(United Kingdom) Fergus Anderson	Moto Guzzi	(United Kingdom) Geoff Duke	Gilera	Report
1953	(West Germany) Werner Haas	NSU	(West Germany) Werner Haas	NSU	(Italy) Enrico Lorenzetti	Moto Guzzi	(United Kingdom) Geoff Duke	Gilera	Report
1952	(United Kingdom) Cecil Sandford	MV Agusta	(Italy) Enrico Lorenzetti	Moto Guzzi	(United Kingdom) Geoff Duke	Norton	(Italy) Umberto Masetti	Gilera	Report
1951	(Italy) Gianni Leoni	Mondial			(United Kingdom) Bill Doran	AJS	(United Kingdom) Geoff Duke	Norton	Report
1950	(Italy) Bruno Ruffo	Mondial			(United Kingdom) Bob Foster	Velocette	(Italy) Umberto Masetti	Gilera	Report
1949	(Italy) Nello Pagani	Mondial			(United Kingdom) Freddie Frith	Velocette	(Italy) Nello Pagani	Gilera	Report

== Bibliography ==
- Aalberts, Jan (2000). 75 Jaar Dutch TT: De Geschiedenis van de Motorraces in Assen (in Dutch). Assen: Stichting Circuit van Drenthe. ISBN 978-90-901392-1-0.
- van den Berg, Mischa (2025). 100 jaar TT Assen (in Dutch and English). Assen: Uitgeverij Noordboek - Van Gorcum. ISBN 978-94-6471-370-1.
