= TT Circuit Assen =

Motorsport track in the Netherlands

The Cathedral of Speed

- Grand Prix Circuit (2006–present)

- Motorcycle Circuit (2010–present)
- Location: Assen, Drenthe, Netherlands
- Coordinates: 52°57′42″N 6°31′24″E
- Capacity: 110,000
- FIA Grade: 2
- Owner: Stichting Circuit van Drenthe
- Opened: 11 July 1925; 101 years ago (as Van Drenthe Street Circuit); 16 July 1955; 71 years ago (as Modern Circuit)
- Closed: 1954 (for Van Drenthe Street Circuit)
- Major events: Current: Grand Prix motorcycle racing Dutch TT (1949–2019, 2021–present); World SBK (1992–2019, 2021–present); Sidecar World Championship (1955–2003, 2005–2008, 2013–2019, 2021–present); BSB (2012–2019, 2025–present); Supercar Challenge (2001–present); Former: Eurocup-3 (2025); FIM EWC (1979–1980, 1995–1996, 2003–2006); MXGP (2015–2018); DTM (2019–2021); ETRC (2004–2005, 2009); ADAC GT Masters (2008–2011); Superleague Formula (2010–2011); Champ Car World Series (2007); Motocross World Championship (2015-2018)
- Website: http://www.tt-assen.com/

Grand Prix Circuit (2006–present)
- Length: 4.555 km (2.830 mi)
- Turns: 18
- Race lap record: 1:17.109 ( (Austria) Ingo Gerstl, Toro Rosso STR1, 2023, BOSS GP/F1)

Motorcycle Circuit (2010–present)
- Length: 4.542 km (2.822 mi)
- Turns: 18
- Race lap record: 1:31.866 ( (Italy) Francesco Bagnaia, Ducati Desmosedici GP24, 2024, MotoGP)

Grand Prix Circuit (2005)
- Length: 5.997 km (3.726 mi)
- Turns: 25
- Race lap record: 2:00.991 ( (Italy) Valentino Rossi, Yamaha YZR-M1, 2005, MotoGP)

National Circuit (2005)
- Length: 3.851 km (2.393 mi)
- Turns: 16
- Race lap record: 1:18.602 ( (Germany) Martin Hippe, Dallara F303, 2005, F3)

Grand Prix Circuit (2002–2004)
- Length: 6.027 km (3.745 mi)
- Turns: 26
- Race lap record: 1:59.472 ( (Italy) Valentino Rossi, Yamaha YZR-M1, 2004, MotoGP)

National Circuit (2002–2004)
- Length: 3.904 km (2.426 mi)
- Turns: 17
- Race lap record: 1:15.928 ( (Germany) Thomas Holzer, Dallara F302, 2004, F3)

Grand Prix Circuit (1984–2001)
- Length: 6.049 km (3.759 mi)
- Turns: 26
- Race lap record: 2:02.471 ( (Japan) Tadayuki Okada, Honda NSR500, 1999, 500cc)

National Circuit (1981–2001)
- Length: 3.919 km (2.435 mi)
- Turns: 17
- Race lap record: 1:23.110 ( (France) Raymond Roche, Ducati 888 SBK, 1992, World SBK)

Grand Prix Circuit (1981–1983)
- Length: 7.685 km (4.775 mi)
- Race lap record: 2:47.470 ( (United States) Kenny Roberts, Yamaha YZR500, 1983, 500cc)

Grand Prix Circuit (1976–1980)
- Length: 7.717 km (4.795 mi)
- Race lap record: 2:54.500 ( (Italy) Virginio Ferrari, Suzuki RG 500, 1979, 500cc)

Grand Prix Circuit (1955–1975)
- Length: 7.700 km (4.785 mi)
- Race lap record: 2:55.500 ( (United Kingdom) Barry Sheene, Suzuki RG 500, 1975, 500cc)

Van Drenthe Circuit (1926–1954)
- Length: 16.536 km (10.275 mi)
- Race lap record: 5:49.400 ( (United Kingdom) Geoff Duke, Gilera Saturno, 1954, 500cc)

Original Circuit (1925)
- Length: 28.400 km (17.647 mi)

The TT Circuit Assen is a motorsport race track built in 1955 and located in Assen, Netherlands. Host of the Dutch TT, it is popularly referred to as "The Cathedral of Speed" by motorcycle racing fans. The venue has the distinction of holding the most Grand Prix motorcycle races every year (except 2020) since the series was created in 1949. It has a capacity of 110,000 spectators, including 60,000 seats. Since 1992, the circuit has also been part of the World SBK calendar except for the 2020 season.

== History ==
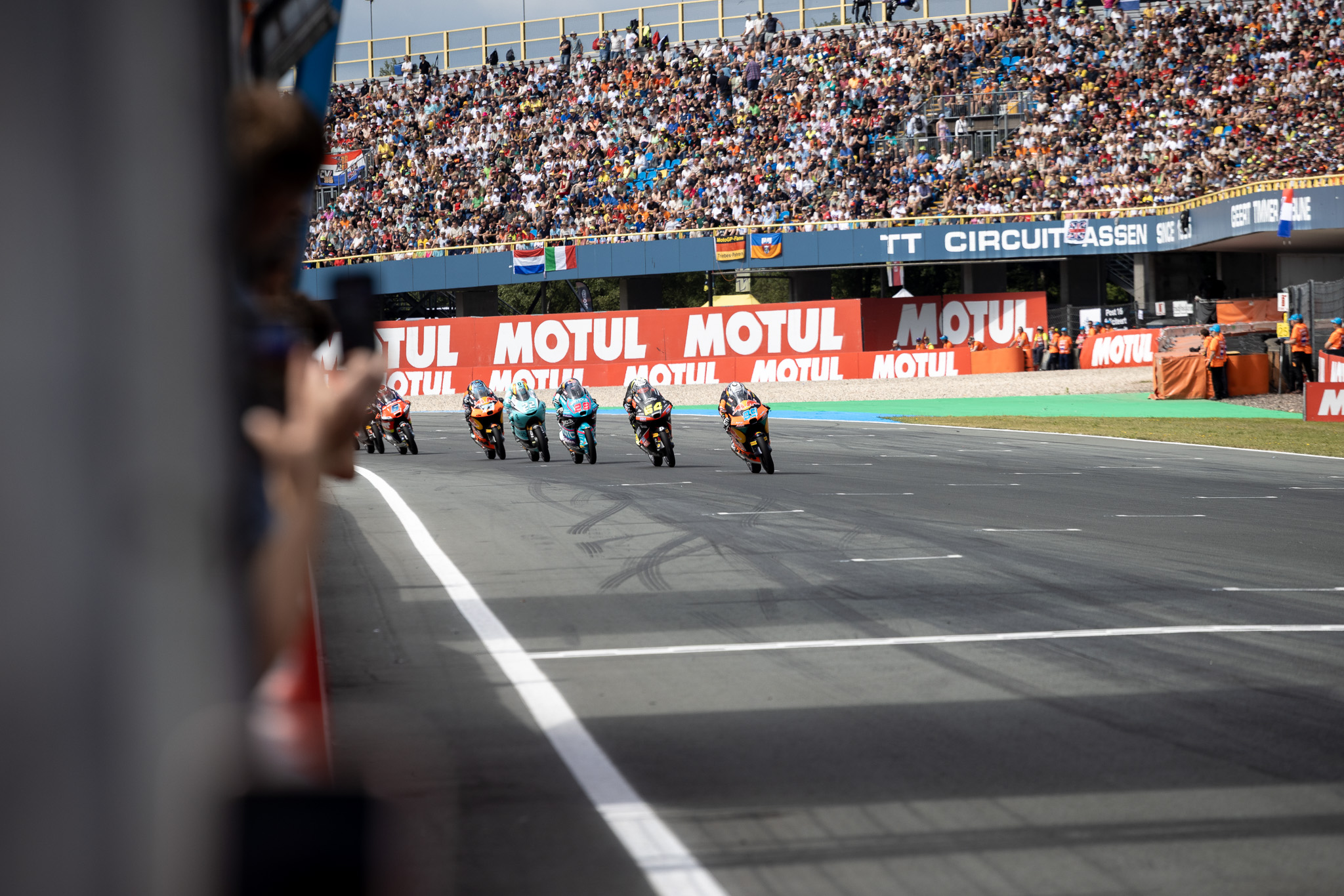
Geert Timmer Tribune

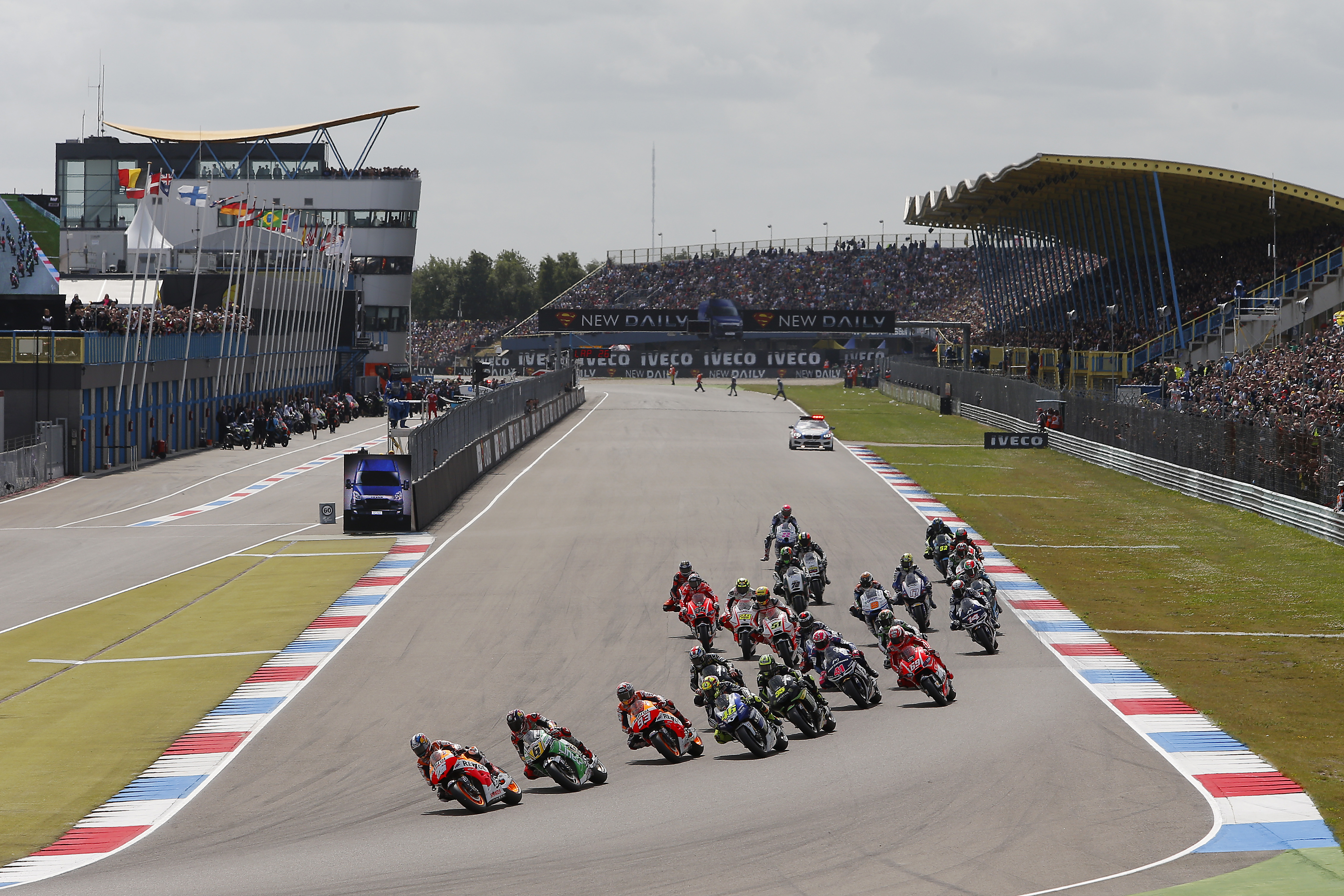
Main straight

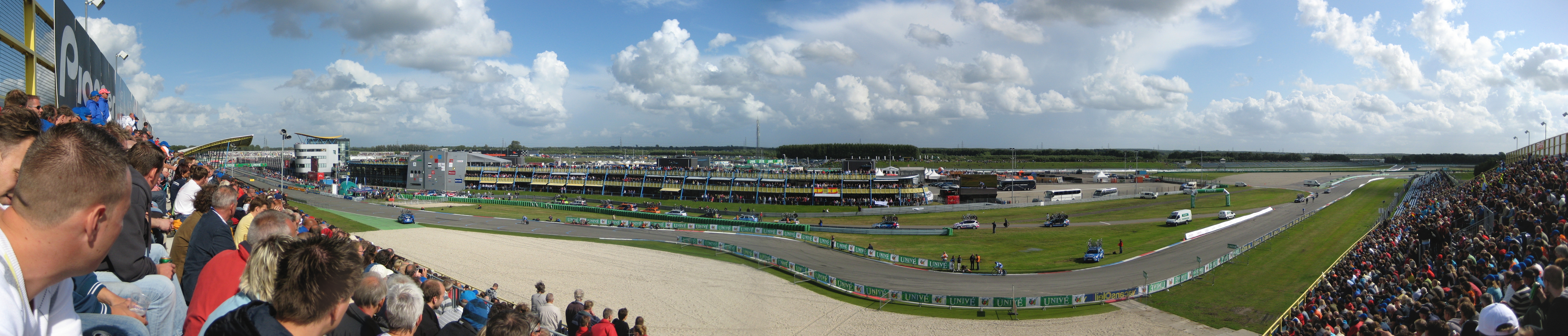
Panoramic view of the TT Circuit Assen

The original Assen track was first used for the 1926 Dutch TT (Tourist Trophy) race, after the first 1925 event was held on country roads through the villages of Rolde, Borger, Schoonloo and Grolloo, and organized by the Motorclub Assen en Omstreken. The brick- and semi-paved track had a length of 28.57 km (17.75 mi). The winner was Piet van Wijngaarden on a 500 cc Norton with an average speed of 91.4 km/h (56.8 mph). From 1926 on the Dutch TT was held at Assen on a street circuit through De Haar, Barteldsbocht, Oude Tol, Hooghalen, Laaghalen and Laaghalerveen.

In 1951 the Italian Umberto Masetti took the record on a 500 cc Gilera with an average speed of 162.35 km/h (100.88 mph). In 1954, Geoff Duke of Great Britain reached 170.69 km/h (106.06 mph). The circuit remained unchanged until 1955, when a whole new circuit was built by using a third of the original street circuit, joined with purpose-built sections, but less than a third of the length and much more like a modern road racing circuit.

In the period of 1999–2002, the circuit invested millions in upgrades. In 1999, the circuit management placed a new main grandstand and hospitality buildings. In 2000, a new Race Control tower was built, as well as 34 newly equipped pit boxes, a new media and medical centre. Between September 2001 and April 2002, another €9 million was spent on the enlargement of the paddock area from 40 to 60.000 square metres. This upgrade meant that the Veenslang and Ruskenhoek corners had to be altered. The main straight has also moved about 50 m (160 ft) eastwards and a new two-lane tunnel now connects the paddock with the main entrance road and the media accreditation / welcome centre. The Mandeveen and Duikersloot corners have been moved back by 10 metres to accommodate larger run-offs and gravel beds at the southern part of the circuit. That part of the track has also been resurfaced with new asphalt. In total, the circuit has been shortened from 6.049 to 6.027 km (3.759 to 3.745 mi). The total cost of these upgrades was €23 million.

In 2005, the grandstand at the Geert Timmer corner was slightly altered. In order to improve the gravel run-off length, the grandstand was made in a 'floating' manner to accommodate the extra space that was needed. The lay-out of the circuit was also slightly altered.

The circuit was fundamentally redesigned again in 2006, becoming the so-called A-Style Assen TT Circuit. All alterations aside, only one section of the circuit is original; the finish line never moved. On 21 September 2009 it was announced that a new chicane will be added, after a request from the A1GP organization, however A1GP was unable to start the 2009–2010 season and as a substitute the Superleague Formula replaced A1GP.

== Layout history ==
TT Circuit Assen layout history
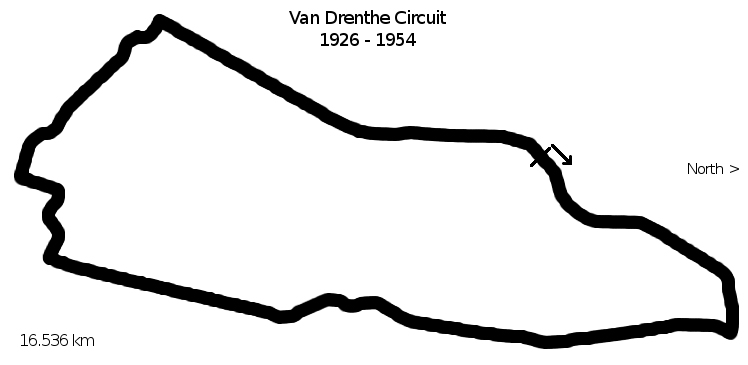
Original Dutch TT Van Drenthe Circuit (1926–1954)

Grand Prix Circuit (1984–2001)

Grand Prix Circuit (2002–2004)

Grand Prix Circuit (2005)

Grand Prix Circuit (2006–present)

Motorcycle Circuit (2010–present)

== Current racetrack ==
Assen race track was built in 1955, and initially had a length of 7.705 km (4.788 mi). The current track has a length of 4.555 km (2.830 mi) with the mixture of super fast flat-out and slow corners. The longest straight is 560 m (1,840 ft). The curves in Assen were traditionally banked and the surface is extremely grippy, so the riders were able to drive much faster on the course than other circuits. Today these sloped or curved bends have been modified due to safety issues.

=== Innovation ===
On 6 July 2004, the organisation announced plans for an amusement park located to the north of the track. In 2006 the northern loop was removed and the length was shortened to 4.555 km (2.830 mi). The new centre is expected to be visited by 300,000 people, and the total investment is approximately €85 million.

== Events ==
Current

- April: Superbike World Championship, Supersport World Championship, Sportbike World Championship, FIM Women's Circuit Racing World Championship, Moto4 Northern Cup
- May: Ducati Club Races
- June: Grand Prix motorcycle racing Dutch TT, Belcar ADAC Hansa Pokal Rennen, Red Bull MotoGP Rookies Cup, Harley-Davidson Bagger World Cup
- July: Truckstar Festival
- August: Supercar Challenge Jack’s Casino Racing Day, Porsche Carrera Cup Benelux, IDM Superbike Championship, TABAC Classic GP Assen
- September: Sidecar World Championship, British Superbike Championship, British Supersport Championship, Moto4 Northern Cup
- October: Supercar Challenge Finaleraces, Porsche Sprint Challenge Benelux

Future

- Motocross of Nations (2019, 2027)

Former

- Acceleration 2014 (2014)
- ADAC Formel Masters (2008–2011)
- ADAC GT Masters (2008–2011)
- ATS Formel 3 Cup (2004–2012)
- BOSS GP (2010, 2015–2019, 2023–2025)
- Champ Car World Series
  - Bavaria Champ Car Grand Prix (2007)
- Deutsche Tourenwagen Masters (2019–2021)
- DTM Trophy (2021)
- Eurocup-3 (2025)
- European Truck Racing Championship (2004–2005, 2009)
- FIM Endurance World Championship (1979–1980, 1995–1996, 2003–2006)
- Formula 750 (1976–1979)
- Formula Renault 2.0 Germany (1997–1998, 2004–2005)
- Formula Renault 2.0 Netherlands (2003–2005)
- Formula Renault Northern European Cup (2006–2017)
- GT4 European Trophy (2011, 2013)
- Motocross World Championship (2015–2018)
- MotoE World Championship
  - Dutch eRace (2021–2025)
- Porsche Carrera Cup Germany (1997)
- Prototype Cup Germany (2023)
- SMP F4 Championship (2017–2018)
- Superleague Formula
  - Superleague Formula round Netherlands (2010–2011)
- Supersport 300 World Championship (2017–2019, 2021–2025)
- Super Tourenwagen Cup (1996)
- TCR Europe Touring Car Series (2018)
- W Series (2019)

== Lap records ==
As of September 2026, the fastest official race lap records at the TT Circuit Assen are listed as:

Category	Time	Driver	Vehicle	Event
Grand Prix Circuit (2006–present): 4.555 km (2.830 mi)
BOSS GP/F1	1:17.109	Ingo Gerstl	Toro Rosso STR1	2023 Assen BOSS GP round
BOSS GP/Formula Renault 3.5	1:20.478	Antônio Pizzonia	Dallara T12	2023 Assen BOSS GP round
Champ Car	1:20.727	Dan Clarke	Panoz DP01	2007 Bavaria Champ Car Grand Prix
BOSS GP/GP2	1:22.896	Simone Colombo	Dallara GP2/11	2025 Assen BOSS GP round
Superleague Formula	1:23.547	Yelmer Buurman	Panoz DP09	2010 Assen Superleague Formula round
Class 1 Touring Cars	1:26.123	Fabio Scherer	Audi RS5 Turbo DTM 2020	2020 Assen DTM round
FA1	1:26.831	Dani Clos	Lola B05/52	2014 Assen FA1 round
Formula Regional	1:31.528	Valerio Rinicella	Tatuus F3 T-318-EC3	2025 Assen Eurocup-3 round
Formula Three	1:31.903	Markus Pommer	Dallara F306	2011 2nd Assen German F3 round
LMP3	1:32.023	Jan Marschalkowski	Ligier JS P320	2023 Assen Prototype Cup Germany round
Superkart	1:33.059	Peter Elkmann	Anderson/VM	2020 Dutch Superkart Grand Prix
CN	1:33.364	Alex Cascatău	Norma M20-FC	2020 2nd Assen GT & Prototype Challenge round
GT3	1:33.743	Mike Rockenfeller	Audi R8 LMS Evo	2021 Assen DTM round
Formula Renault 2.0	1:34.963	Gilles Magnus	Tatuus FR2.0/13	2017 Assen Formula Renault NEC round
MotoGP	1:36.558	Valentino Rossi	Yamaha YZR-M1	2009 Dutch TT
Porsche Carrera Cup	1:38.410	Larry ten Voorde	Porsche 911 (992 I) GT3 Cup	2023 Assen Porsche Carrera Cup Benelux round
Formula 4	1:38.474	Michael Belov	Tatuus F4-T014	2018 Assen SMP F4 round
World SBK	1:38.680	Noriyuki Haga	Ducati 1098R	2009 Assen World SBK round
Lamborghini Super Trofeo	1:39.034	Max Weering	Lamborghini Huracán LP 620-2 Super Trofeo EVO	2020 2nd Assen Supercar Challenge round
250cc	1:40.340	Álvaro Bautista	Aprilia RSA 250	2008 Dutch TT
ADAC Formel Masters	1:40.409	Dennis Vollmair	Dallara Formulino	2009 Assen ADAC Formel Masters round
World SSP	1:40.836	Cal Crutchlow	Yamaha YZF-R6	2009 Assen World SSP round
TCR Touring Car	1:43.563	Dennis de Borst	Hyundai i30 N TCR	2020 2nd Assen Supercar Challenge round
125cc	1:45.098	Sergio Gadea	Aprilia RS125R	2006 Dutch TT
GT4	1:45.223	Reinhard Kofler	KTM X-Bow GT4	2021 Assen DTM Trophy round
Formula Renault 1.6	1:46.198	Anton de Pasquale	Signatech FR 1.6	2014 Assen Formula Renault 1.6 NEC round
Pickup truck racing	1:50.118	Daniël de Jong	MWV6 Pick Up	2014 Assen MW-V6 Pickup Series round
Truck racing	2:10.057	Antonio Albacete	MAN TGS	2009 Assen ETRC round
Motorcycle Circuit (2010–present): 4.542 km (2.822 mi)
MotoGP	1:31.866	Francesco Bagnaia	Ducati Desmosedici GP24	2024 Dutch TT
World SBK	1:32.357	Nicolò Bulega	Ducati Panigale V4 R	2026 Assen World SBK round
Moto2	1:35.580	Diogo Moreira	Kalex Moto2	2025 Dutch TT
World SSP	1:36.952	Stefano Manzi	Yamaha YZF-R9	2025 Assen World SSP round
MotoE	1:39.592	Alessandro Zaccone	Ducati V21L	2025 Dutch TT
Moto3	1:40.395	Joel Kelso	KTM RC250GP	2025 Dutch TT
Bagger World Cup	1:40.424	Eric Granado	Harley-Davidson Road Glide	2026 Assen Harley-Davidson Bagger World Cup round
World SPB	1:42.190	Beñat Fernández	Kove 450RR	2026 Assen World SPB round
BMW F900R Cup	1:46.457	Nikki Coates	BMW F900R	2026 Assen BMW F900R Cup round
World WCR	1:47.132	Beatriz Neila	Yamaha YZF-R7	2026 Assen World WCR round
Supersport 300	1:48.158	Beñat Fernández	Kove 321 RR-S	2025 Assen World Supersport 300 round
250cc	1:50.823	Kilian Holzer	KTM RC4 R	2023 Assen Northern Talent Cup round
Grand Prix Circuit (2005): 5.997 km (3.726 mi)
MotoGP	2:00.991	Valentino Rossi	Yamaha YZR-M1	2005 Dutch TT
World SBK	2:04.685	Chris Vermeulen	Honda CBR1000RR	2005 Assen World SBK round
250cc	2:05.191	Sebastián Porto	Aprilia RSV 250	2005 Dutch TT
World SSP	2:08.865	Katsuaki Fujiwara	Honda CBR600RR	2005 Assen World SSP round
125cc	2:13.536	Héctor Faubel	Aprilia RS125R	2005 Dutch TT
National Circuit (2005): 3.851 km (2.393 mi)
Formula Three	1:18.602	Martin Hippe	Dallara F303	2005 Assen German F3 round
Formula Renault 2.0	1:20.762	Renger van der Zande	Tatuus FR2000	2005 Assen Formula Renault 2.0 Netherlands round
Truck racing	1:52.800	Markus Oestreich	Volkswagen Titan	2005 Assen ETRC round
Grand Prix Circuit (2002–2004): 6.027 km (3.745 mi)
MotoGP	1:59.472	Valentino Rossi	Yamaha YZR-M1	2004 Dutch TT
World SBK	2:02.395	Colin Edwards	Honda VTR1000SP2	2002 Assen World SBK round
250cc	2:03.469	Dani Pedrosa	Honda RS250R	2004 Dutch TT
World SSP	2:06.922	Katsuaki Fujiwara	Suzuki GSX600R	2003 Assen World SSP round
125cc	2:10.123	Jorge Lorenzo	Derbi RSA 125	2004 Dutch TT
National Circuit (2002–2004): 3.904 km (2.426 mi)
Formula Three	1:15.928	Thomas Holzer	Dallara F302	2004 Assen German F3 round
Formula Renault 2.0	1:18.067	Pascal Kochem	Tatuus FR2000	2004 Assen Formula Renault 2000 Germany round
Grand Prix Circuit (1984–2001): 6.049 km (3.759 mi)
500cc	2:02.471	Tadayuki Okada	Honda NSR500	1999 Dutch TT
World SBK	2:03.914	Carl Fogarty	Ducati 996 RS	1999 Assen World SBK round
250cc	2:05.696	Valentino Rossi	Aprilia RSV 250	1999 Dutch TT
World SSP	2:08.748	James Whitham	Yamaha YZF-R6	2001 Assen World SSP round
125cc	2:13.225	Noboru Ueda	Honda RS125R	1999 Dutch TT
80cc	2:30.790	Ian McConnachie	Krauser 80	1986 Dutch TT
National Circuit (1981–2001): 3.919 km (2.435 mi)
World SBK	1:23.110	Raymond Roche	Ducati 888 SBK	1992 Assen World SBK round
Super Touring	1:27.325	Laurent Aïello	Peugeot 406	1996 Assen STW round
Grand Prix Circuit (1981–1983): 7.685 km (4.775 mi)
500cc	2:47.470	Kenny Roberts	Yamaha YZR500	1983 Dutch TT
250cc	2:57.790	Carlos Lavado	Yamaha TZ 250	1983 Dutch TT
125cc	3:05.620	Ángel Nieto	Garelli 125 GP	1983 Dutch TT
50cc	3:24.870	Eugenio Lazzarini	Garelli 50 GP	1983 Dutch TT
Grand Prix Circuit (1976–1980): 7.717 km (4.795 mi)
500cc	2:54.500	Virginio Ferrari	Suzuki RG 500	1979 Dutch TT
350cc	3:02.500	Patrick Fernandez	Yamaha TZ 350	1977 Dutch TT
250cc	3:02.800	Kork Ballington	Kawasaki KR250	1979 Dutch TT
125cc	3:13.200	Ángel Nieto	Minarelli 125 GP	1979 Dutch TT
50cc	3:33.500	Eugenio Lazzarini	Kreidler 50 GP	1977 Dutch TT
Grand Prix Circuit (1955–1975): 7.700 km (4.785 mi)
500cc	2:55.500	Barry Sheene	Suzuki RG 500	1975 Dutch TT
350cc	3:01.400	Johnny Cecotto	Yamaha TZ 350	1975 Dutch TT
250cc	3:04.000	Walter Villa	Harley-Davidson RR250	1975 Dutch TT
125cc	3:12.500	Paolo Pileri	Morbidelli 125	1975 Dutch TT
50cc	3:32.100	Eugenio Lazzarini	Piovaticci 50 GP	1975 Dutch TT
Van Drenthe Circuit (1926–1954): 16.536 km (10.275 mi)
500cc	5:49.400	Geoff Duke	Gilera Saturno	1954 Dutch TT
350cc	6:11.800	Fergus Anderson	Moto Guzzi Bialbero	1954 Dutch TT
250cc	6:20.500	Werner Haas	NSU Rennmax G.P. 250cc	1954 Dutch TT
125cc	7:06.900	Rupert Hollaus	NSU Rennfox G.P. 125cc	1954 Dutch TT

== Fatalities ==
- Yasutomo Nagai - 1995 Superbike World Championship
- Alessio Perilli - 2004 Superstock European Championship

== See also ==
- Dutch TT
- Circuit Zandvoort
