= Margarete Zuelzer =

German zoologist and biologist

Dr. Margarete Zuelzer
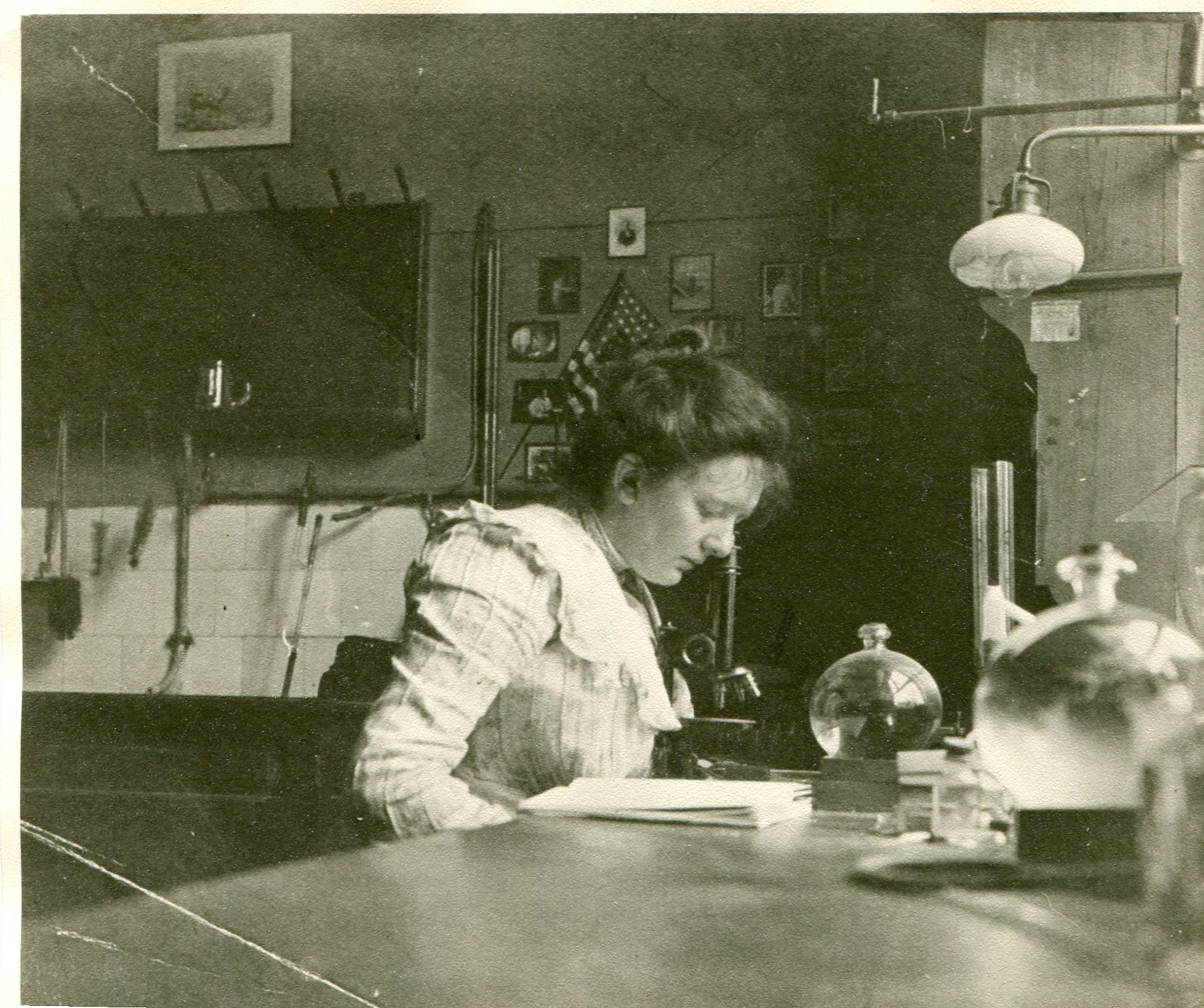
- Zuelzer as a student in Heidelberg in the summer semester of 1902
- Born: 7 February 1877
- Died: 29 August 1943 (aged 66); Westerbork transit camp, Hooghalen, Netherlands
- Cause of death: Starvation
- Education: PhD (1904); Humboldt University of Berlin; University of Heidelberg
- Scientific career
- Fields: Biology, Zoology
- Institutions: Imperial Ministry of Health (Kaiserliches Gesundheitsamt); Institute for Tropical Hygiene, Netherlands
- Patrons: Wilhelm Schüffner

Margarete Hedwig Zuelzer (7 February 1877 – 29 August 1943) was a German biologist and zoologist specializing in the study of protozoa.

== Biography ==
Margarete Zuelzer was the daughter of Jewish textile manufacturer Julius Zuelzer (1838–1889) and Henriette née Friedlaender (1852–1931). She studied natural sciences at the Humboldt University of Berlin and at the University of Heidelberg. She was among the first generation of women to officially attend university in Germany. Studying science in particular was so unusual for a woman at the time that Zuelzer had to get special permission from each of her professors to attend their classes. She earned her doctorate in 1904 with a dissertation on Difflugia urceolata Carter, a protozoan. This made her the 37th woman to have earned a doctorate at the University of Heidelberg and the sixth to have earned one from its faculty of natural sciences.

In 1907, she became the assistant at the water treatment center in Berlin. In 1916, she took a position at the Imperial Ministry of Health (Kaiserliches Gesundheitsamt), later the Reich's Ministry of Health (Reichsgesundheitsamt). After 1919, she led the Protozoa Laboratory in Berlin-Dahlem and continually served as one of the few women on the advisory board, sometimes the only one.

From 1926 to 1929, she was invited by the Dutch government to carry out a research study on "Weil's disease" in the Dutch East Indies, specifically in Bali, Sumatra, and Java. There, she became friends with German-Dutch biologist Wilhelm Schüffner.

In April 1933, she lost her position at the Protozoa Laboratory due to the Law for the Restoration of the Professional Civil Service, which allowed civil servants of "non-Aryan descent" to be dismissed. Zuelzer wrote an appeal demonstrating her ancestors' support of German nationalism, but this made no difference. In October 1939, Zuelzer immigrated to the Netherlands, where she procured a position at the Institute for Tropical Hygiene, which was led by Wilhelm Schüffner.

Her sister Gertrud Zuelzer, a noted painter, was arrested in September 1942 and sent to Theresienstadt after a failed attempt to flee Germany to Switzerland. Margarete sent Gertrud packages of clothing and colored pencils with which Gertrud drew portraits of other prisoners in exchange for food. Gertrud credited her sister Margarete's packages as the reason that she was able to survive.

In April 1943, Margarete Zuelzer was forced to move into a Jewish ghetto in Amsterdam. On 21 May, she was sent to the Westerbork Transit Camp. Before her deportation, her friend and colleague Wilhelm Schüffner had attempted in vain to procure a special position for her. She died of starvation in the Westerbork Transit Camp on 23 August 1943, aged 66.

In 2012, a Stolperstein ("stumbling stone") was laid in her memory at Eichkampstrasse 108 in Berlin, her last residence in the city.

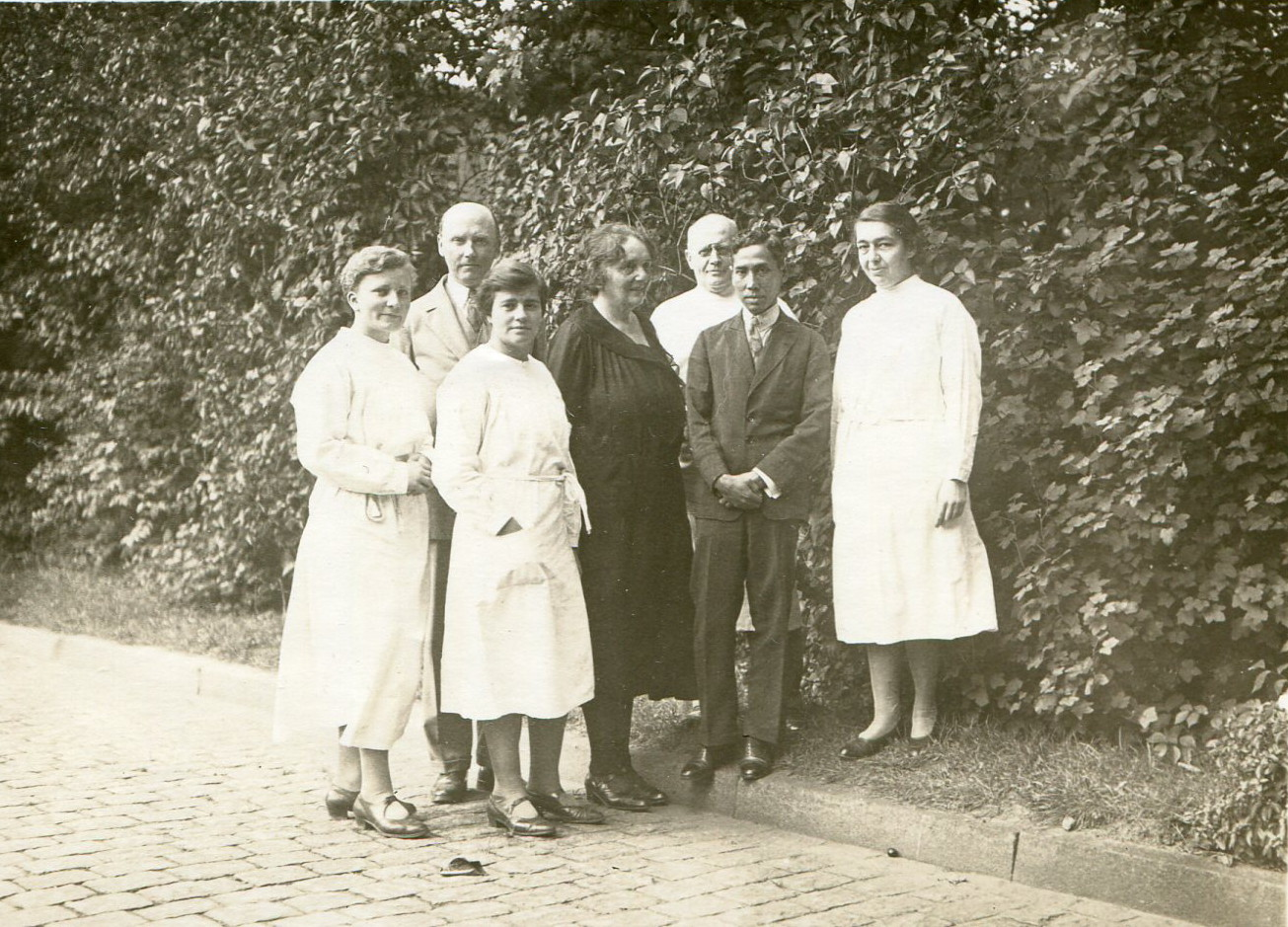
In the garden of the health department of the empire, fall 1926. Margarete Zuelzer (middle), Wilhelm Schüffner (second from left), and Paul Uhlenhuth (third from right)

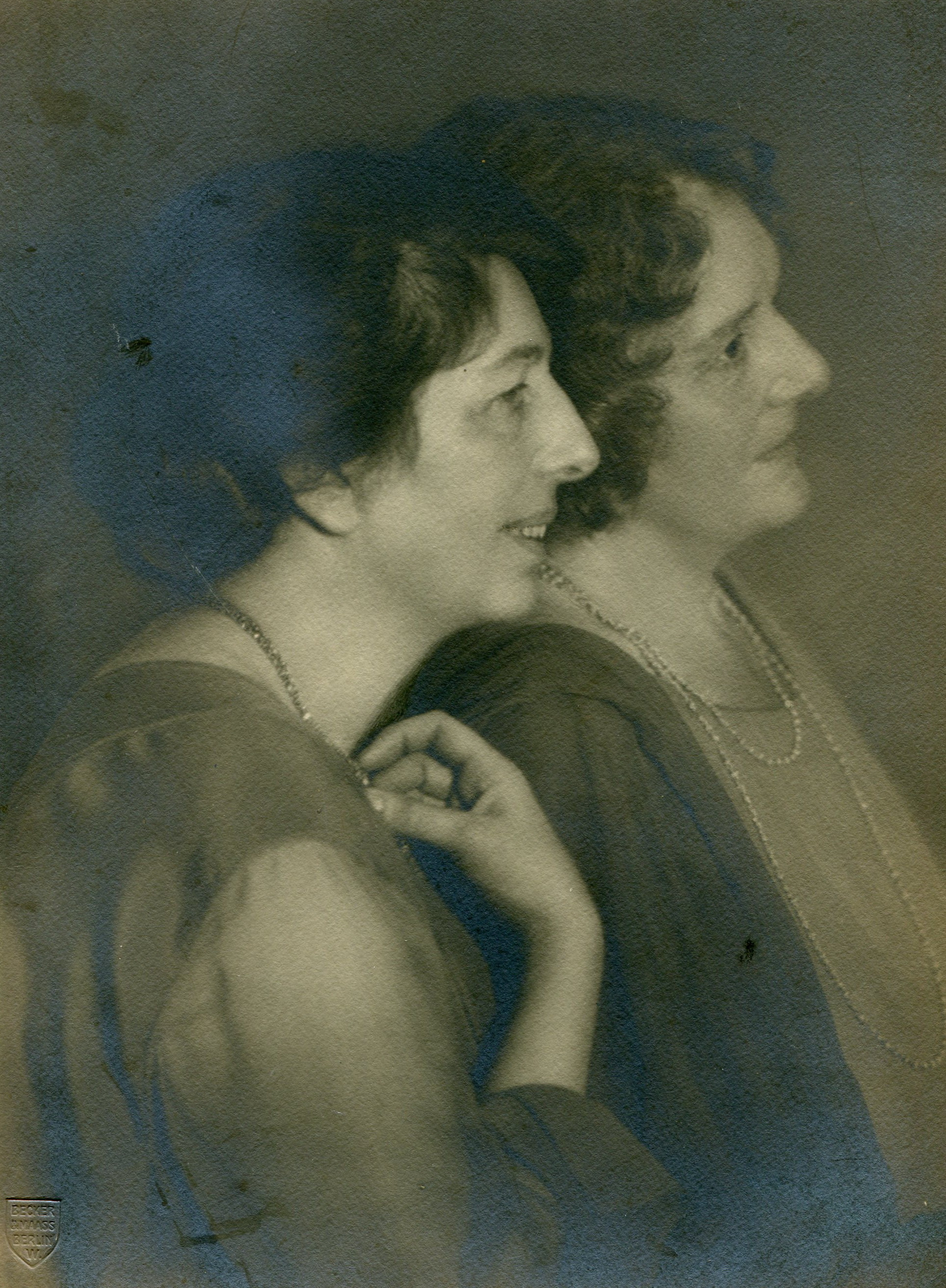
Gertrud and Margarete Zuelzer (circa 1930)

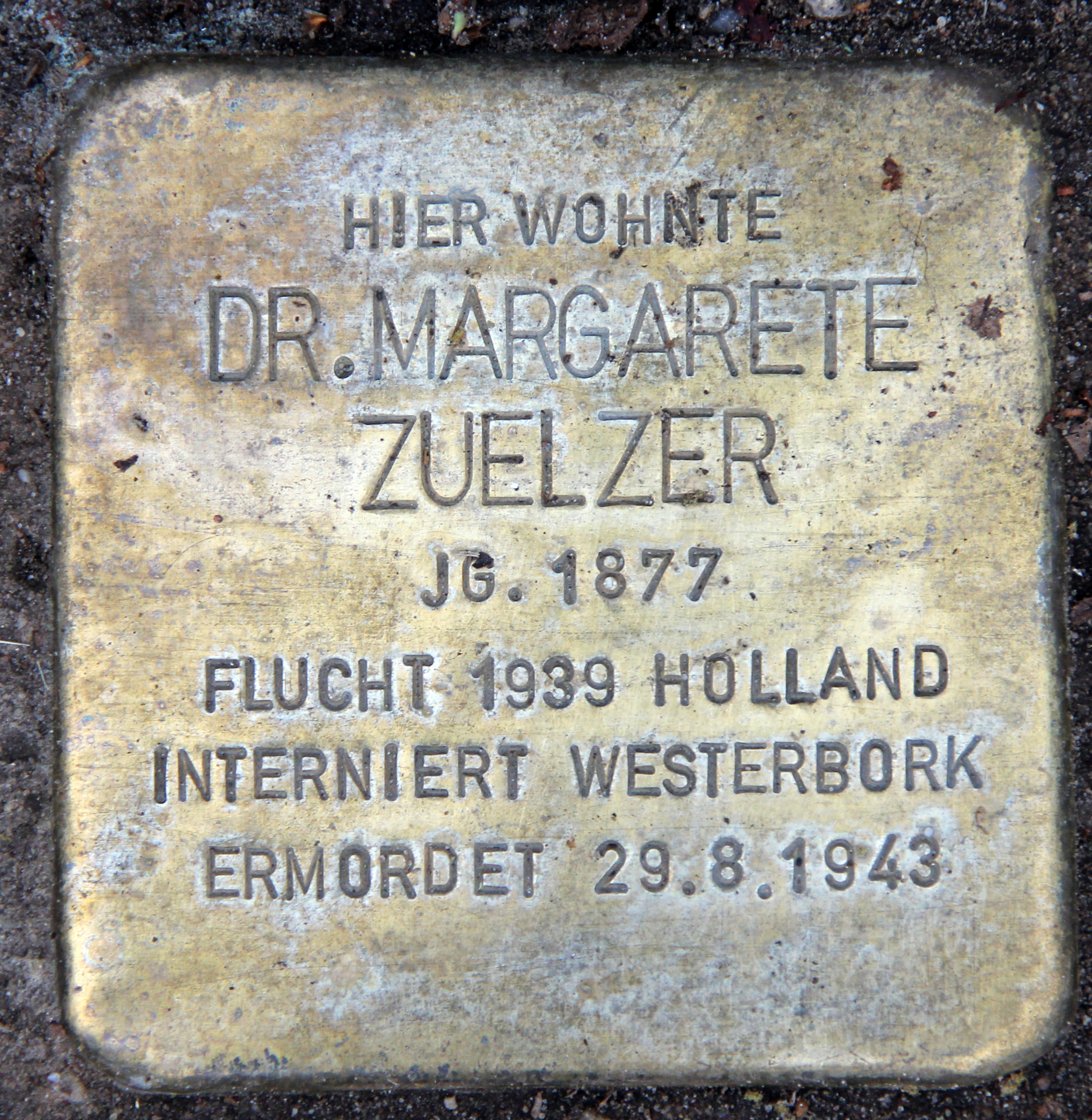
Stolperstein for Margarete Zuelzer, Eichkampstr 108 Berlin

== Bibliography ==
- Bloch, Max. "Gertrud und Margarete Zuelzer. Zwei Schwestern im Holocaust." Aschkenas, Vol. 24 (2014), Issue 1, pp. 195–214.
- Bogdanov, Franziska. "Das Leben wird anders schauen nach dieser Schreckenszeit. Der Nachlass von Gertrud und Margarete Zuelzer im Jüdischen Museum Berlin." Journal of the Jewish Museum Berlin. Volume 13 (2015), pp. 40–41.
