= Hooghalen =

- Village
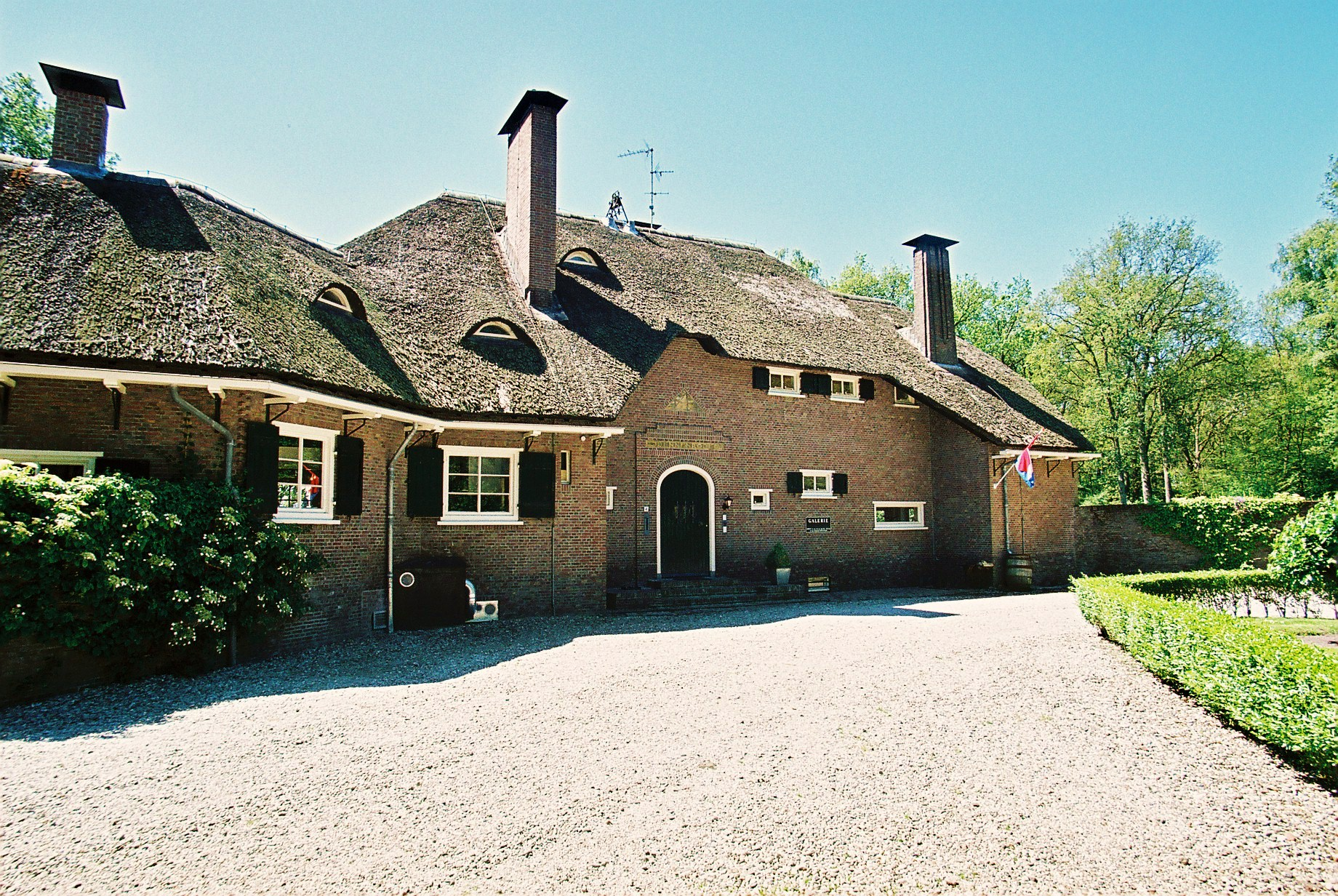

- Flag

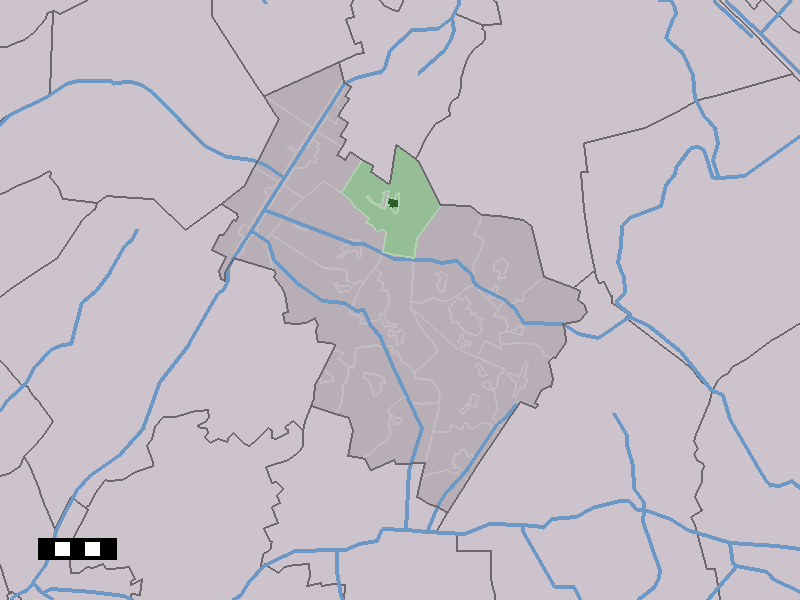
- The town centre (dark green) and the statistical district (light green) of Hooghalen in the municipality of Midden-Drenthe.

- Location in the Netherlands Hooghalen (Netherlands)
- Coordinates: 52°55′N 6°32′E
- Country: Netherlands
- Province: Drenthe
- Municipality: Midden-Drenthe

Area
  - Total: 25.07 km^{2} (9.68 sq mi)
- Elevation: 17 m (56 ft)

Population (2021)
  - Total: 1,345
  - Density: 53.65/km^{2} (139.0/sq mi)
- Time zone: UTC+1 (CET)
  - Summer (DST): UTC+2 (CEST)
- Postal code: 9414
- Dialing code: 0592
- Website: http://www.hooghalen.nu

Hooghalen is a village in the municipality Midden-Drenthe, in the Dutch province Drenthe. In Drenthe it is also called Hoal'n or Hoalen , but then people often mean the entire area, with the neighborhoods Laaghalen, Laaghalerveen and Oosthalen.

It is located on the flank of sandy soils, above a salt dome. The main attraction of Hooghalen is the Herinneringscentrum Kamp Westerbork. Here the history is told of Westerbork Camp and the Jewish persecution in general. The former camp is located on the edge of the southern village Westerbork.

== Facilities ==
The village of Hooghalen has a Dutch Reformed and a Reformed Churches liberated church and also has a Reformed municipality. Other facilities in the village are: sports fields, football club HHCombi, a public primary school, a supermarket with postal agency, a bakery and a few other shops and restaurants. Thanks to its location on the Oude Provincialeweg and the A28, Hooghalen can be easily reached by car. There is a motorway connection to the north and south of the village. The railway line Meppel – Groningen runs just east of the village, but there is no longer a station. Hooghalen Station was closed in 1938.

== Environment ==
At the northern edge of the village is a small forest, 't Witte Zand . To the east of the village lies not only the modest ess, but also a large nature reserve: the Hoogwaardij Boswachterij. This consists not only of coniferous forest, but also of a peat bog area (the Hingstveen) and heathland. The camp site is in the middle of the area, the memorial center on the outskirts. Since the end of the sixties there has been a row of radio telescopes, the Westerbork Synthesis Radio Telescope. To prevent disturbance of the observations, motorized traffic and the use of mobile phone s in the wider area is not permitted.

The Heuvingerzand is also part of the forestry. This does not apply to the Groote Zand, a forest and heath area to the north-east of Hooghalen that is owned by The Drentse Landschap. In addition, there is Hijkerveld between Hooghalen and Hijken, which consists of moorland, fens, peat remains and deciduous forest. There is also a sheep cage, where the shepherd leaves every day at half past nine with his Schoonebekers to the heath, and brings the sheep back to the cage at half past four.

== History ==
Until the 18th century no distinction was made between Hooghalen and Laaghalen. Laaghalen is probably a medieval spin-off from Hooghalen. Both places were part of the boermarke van Haelen. The marke was not split in two until 1864, although the villages were already functioning independently at that time. In 1870, Hooghalen received a station on the newly constructed Meppel-Groningen railway line. In 1938 it was closed due to a lack of customers. Fighting acts at the end of the Second World War destroyed many old farms and in the village center. After the Second World War, Hooghalen was expanded on a modest scale with new construction. The village slowly changed from an agricultural village into a commuter village and many farms were given a residential function, a development that took place everywhere in Drenthe.

Until 1 January 1998, Hooghalen was part of the municipality Beilen. At present, the village is located in the municipality of Midden-Drenthe through a merger with the municipality of Westerbork and the municipality Smilde. An Easter fire is also held every year in Hooghalen

== Education ==
There is one primary school, De Bosvlinder.

== Notable Halers ==
- Jasper Iwema (1989), motorcycle racer

== See also ==
- Westerbork Camp
