= De Haar, Assen =

De Haar
- Hamlet
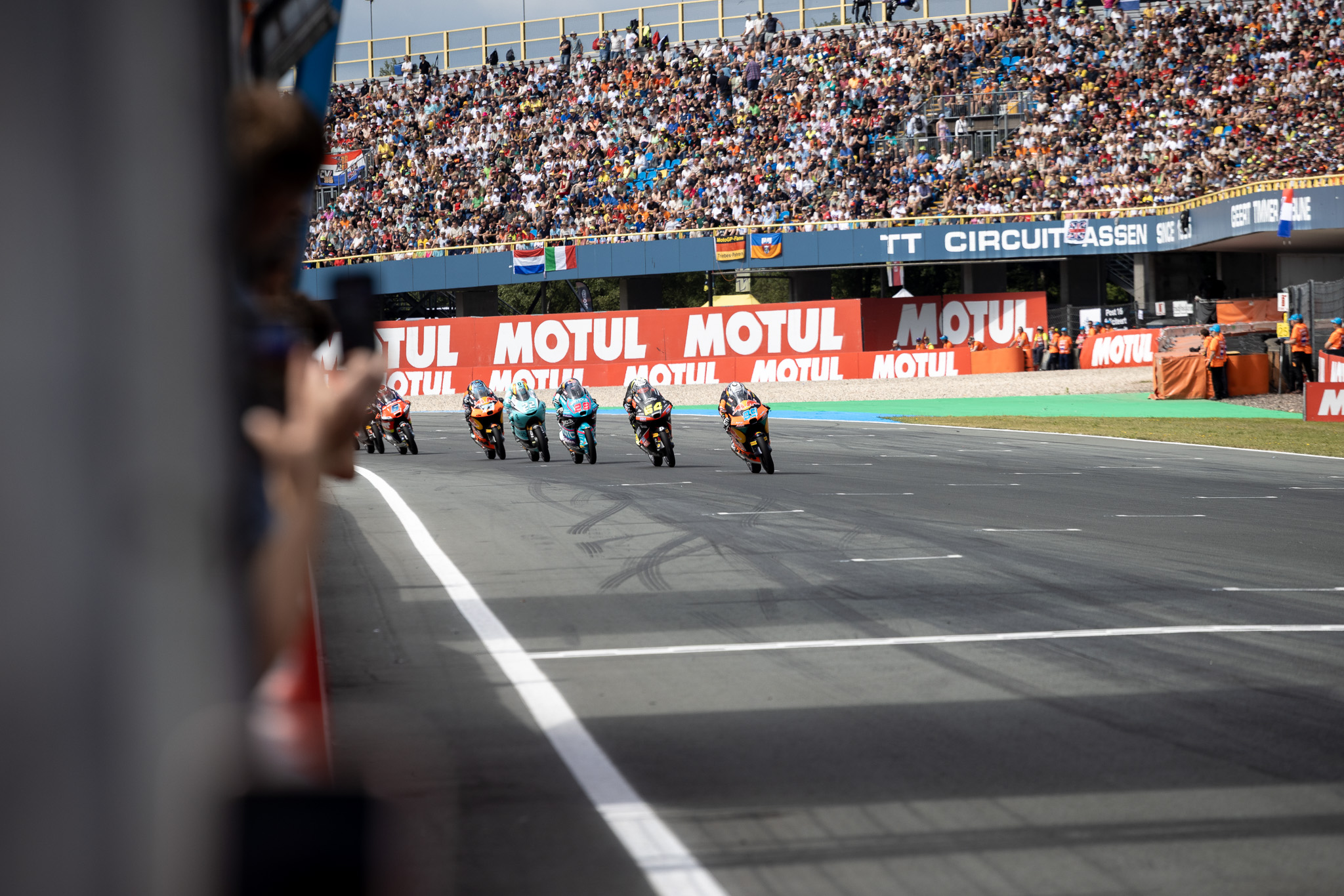
- TT Circuit Assen

- Location in province of Drenthe in the Netherlands De Haar (Netherlands)
- Coordinates: 52°58′3″N 6°32′9″E
- Country: Netherlands
- Province: Drenthe
- Municipality: Assen
- Elevation: 10 m (33 ft)
- Time zone: UTC+1 (CET)
  - Summer (DST): UTC+2 (CEST)
- Postal code: 9405
- Dialing code: 0592

De Haar is a hamlet in the Netherlands and is part of the Assen municipality in Drenthe. The TT Circuit Assen is located in the hamlet.

De Haar is not a statistical entity, and the postal authorities have placed it in Assen. It was first mentioned in the 1850s and means "sandy ridge".

Most of the farms have been torn down for the military training ground De Haar.
