= Schoonloo =

- Village
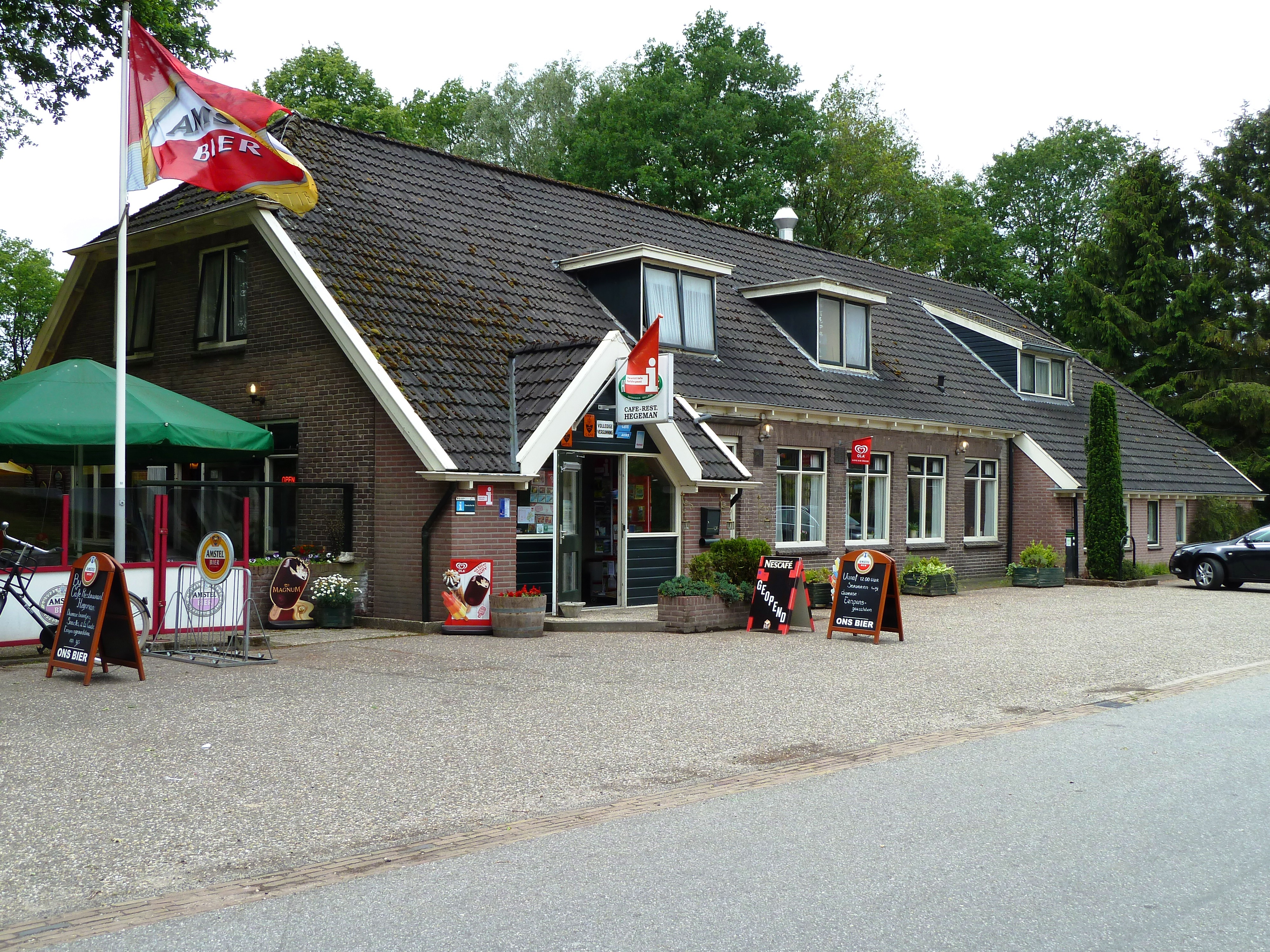
- Inn Hegeman

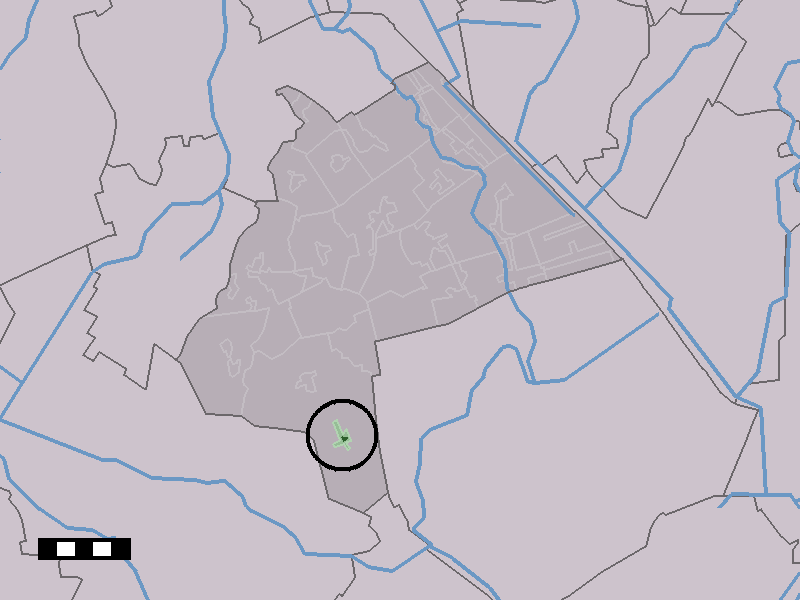
- The village centre (dark green) and the statistical district (light green) of Schoonloo in the municipality of Aa en Hunze.

- Location in the Netherlands Schoonloo (Netherlands)
- Coordinates: 52°54′16″N 6°42′1″E
- Country: Netherlands
- Province: Drenthe
- Municipality: Aa en Hunze

Area
  - Total: 0.72 km^{2} (0.28 sq mi)
- Elevation: 20 m (66 ft)

Population (2021)
  - Total: 180
  - Density: 250/km^{2} (650/sq mi)
- Time zone: UTC+1 (CET)
  - Summer (DST): UTC+2 (CEST)
- Postal code: 9443
- Dialing code: 0592

Schoonloo is a village in the Dutch province of Drenthe, Netherlands. It is a part of the municipality of Aa en Hunze, and lies about 14 km southeast of Assen.

The village was first mentioned in 1328 as Gherard Sconelo. Even though it seemingly reads "beautiful forest", the etymology in unclear. Schoonloo developed in the Middle Ages on the highest point of the Rolderrug as a satellite of Rolde. It mainly consisted of some farms who used the heath as a communal land for their sheep.

Schoonloo was home to 85 people in 1840.

== Gallery ==
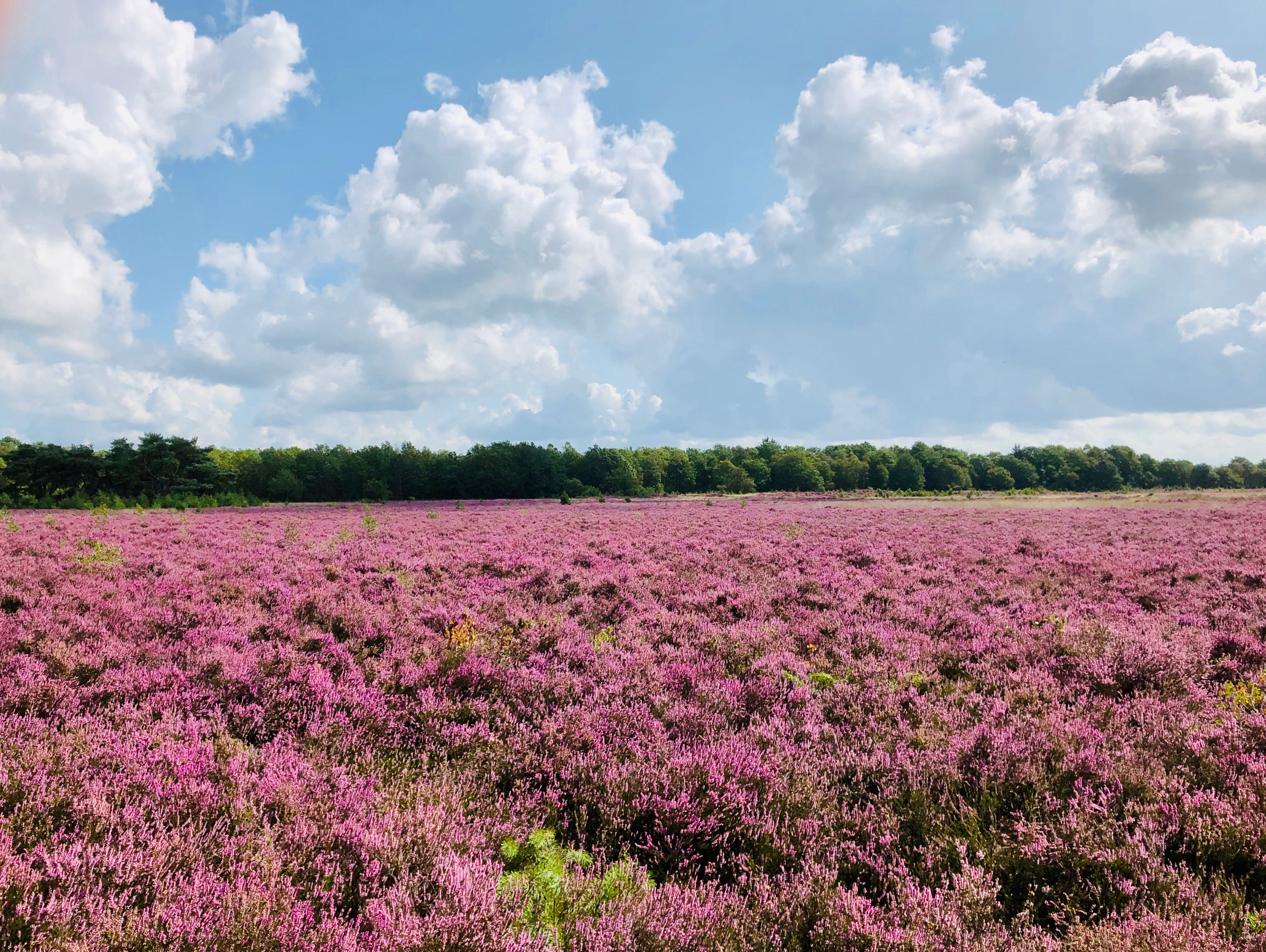
Heath near Schoonloo

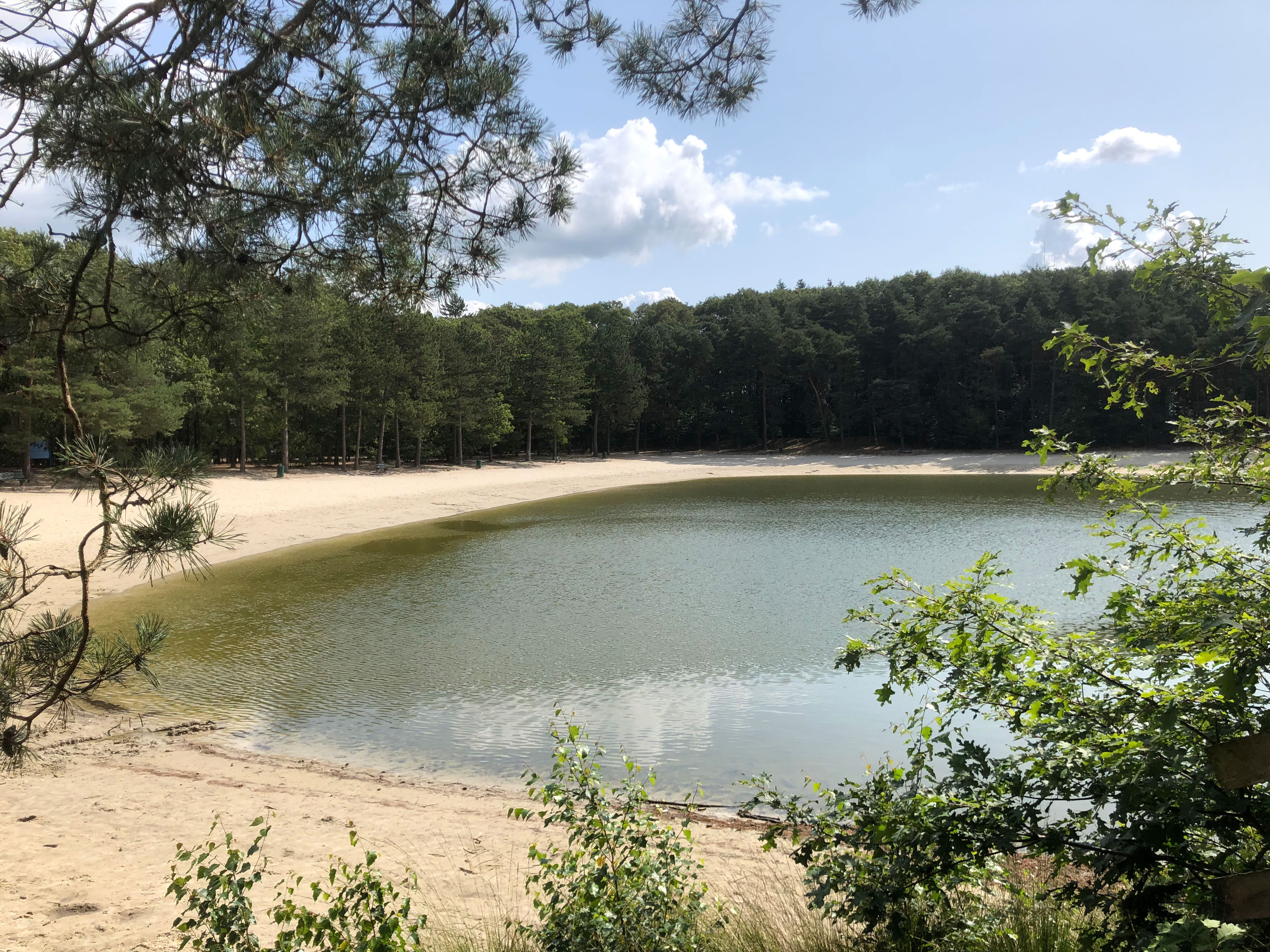
Iberenplas

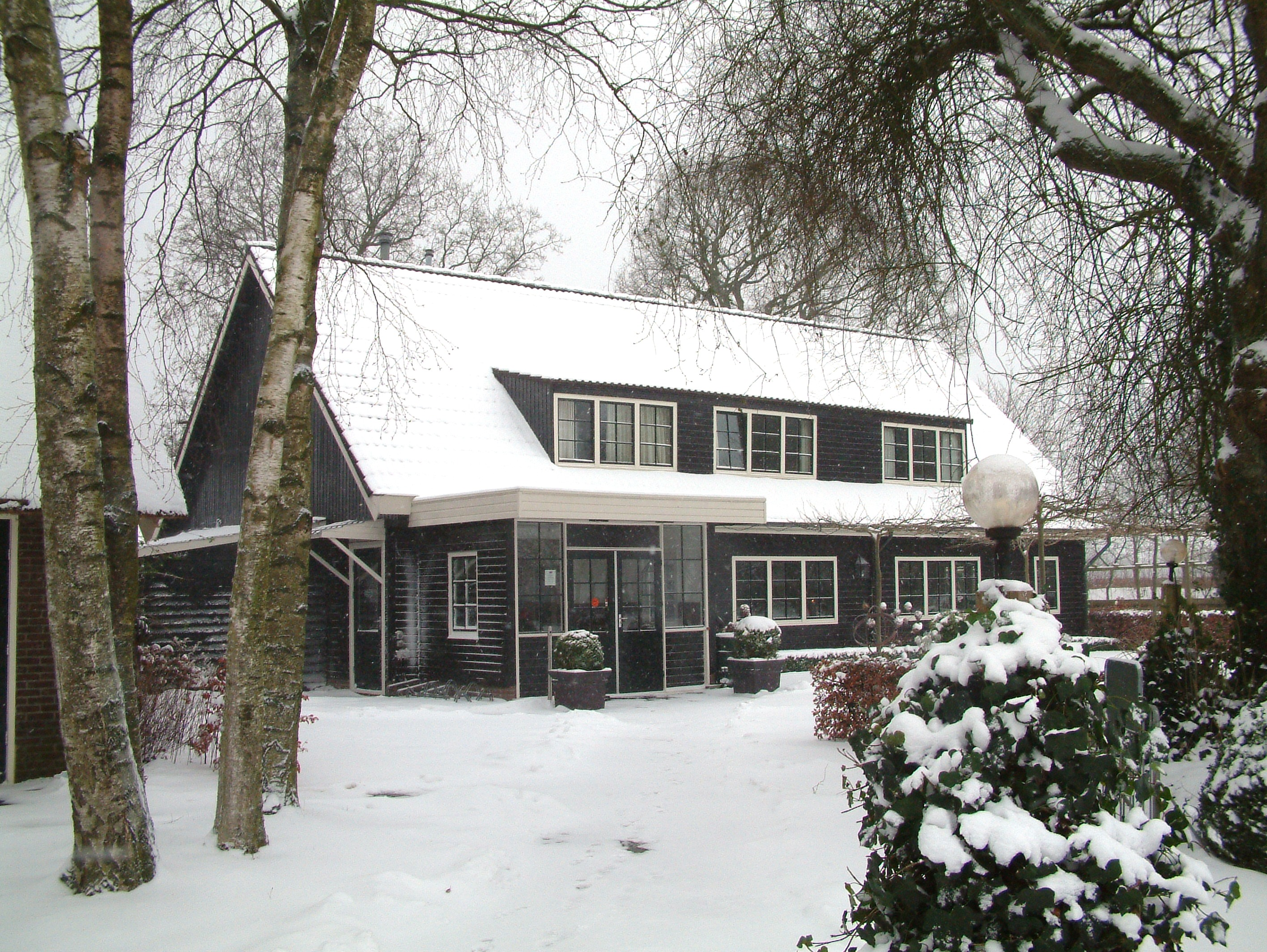
Inn "De Loohoeve"

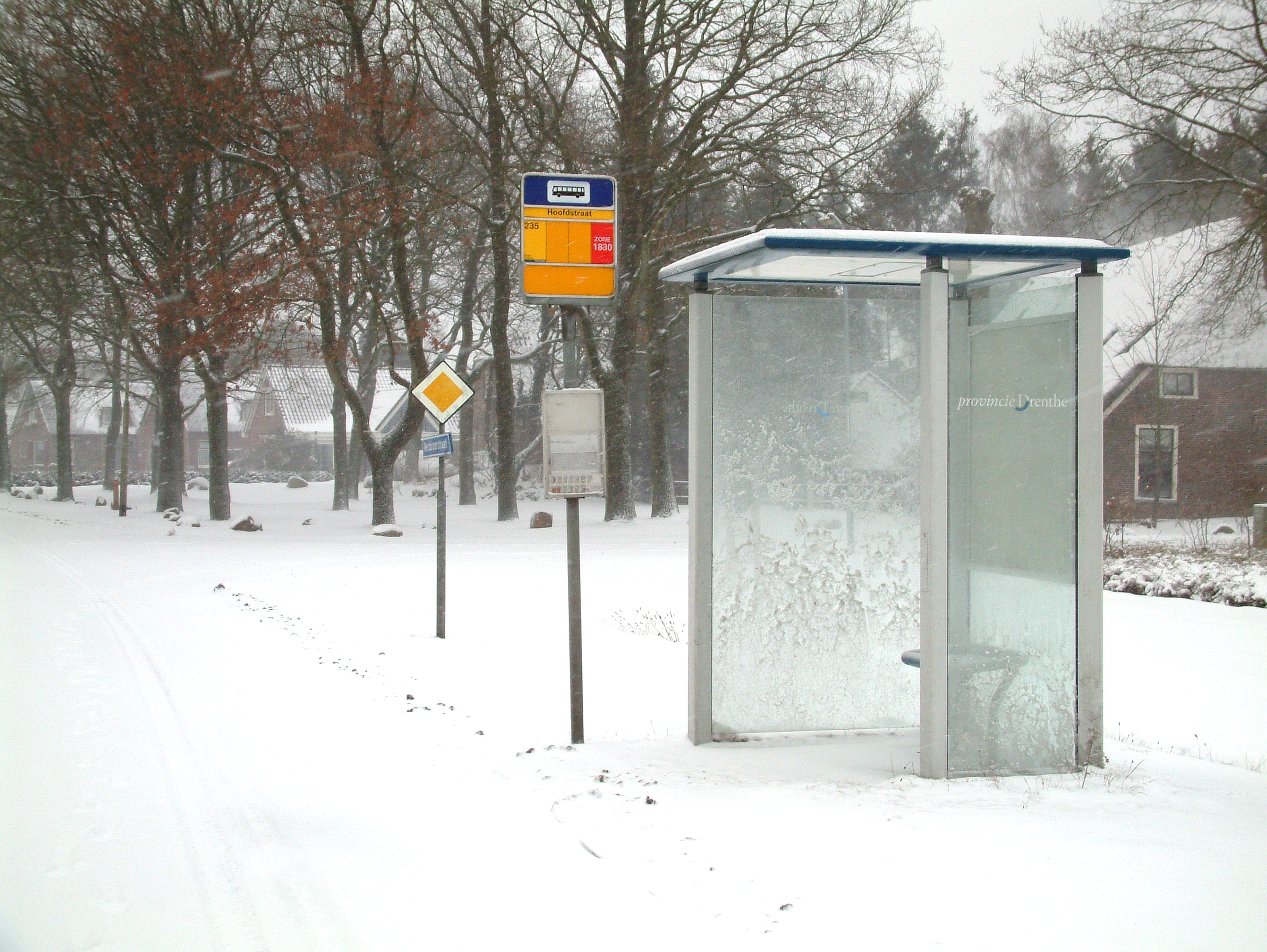
Bus stop in winter
