= Laaghalen =

- Hamlet
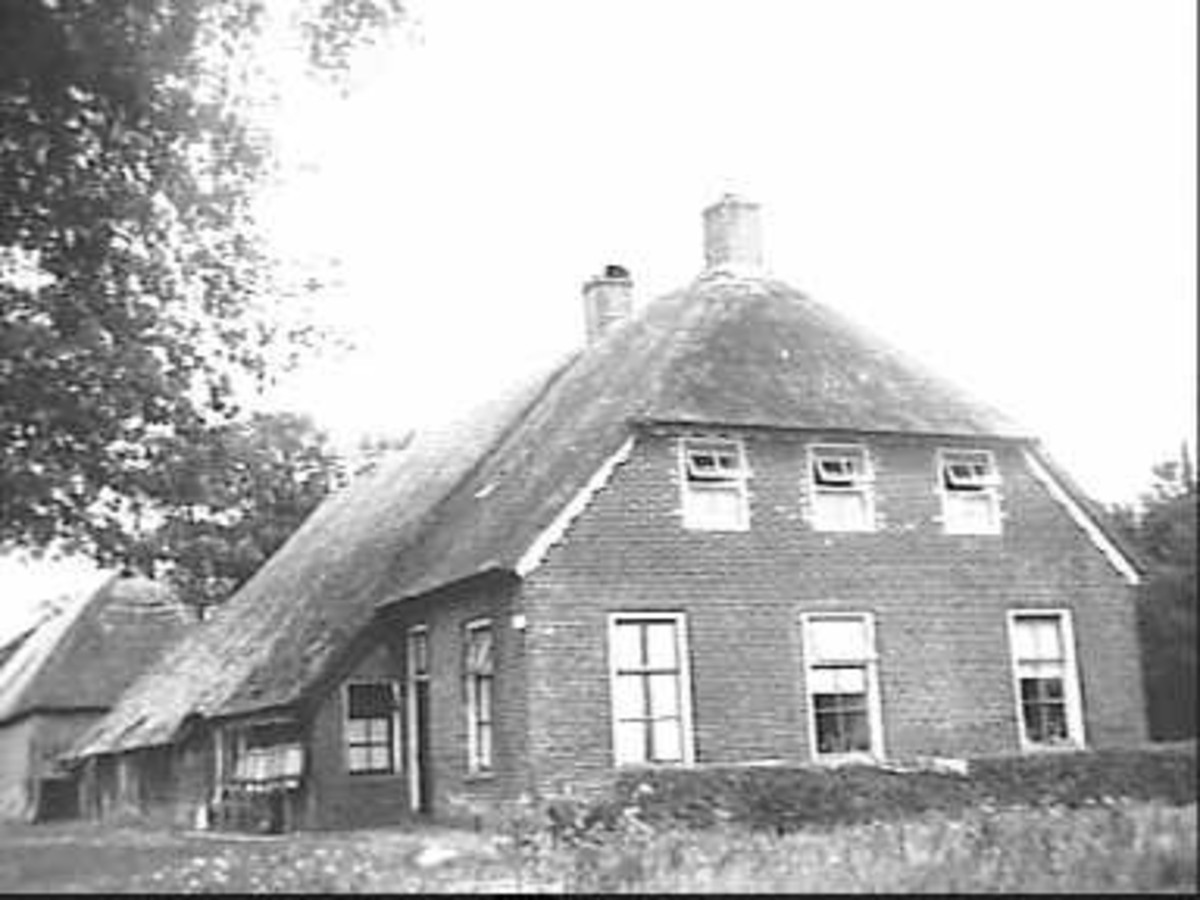
- Farm in Laaghalen

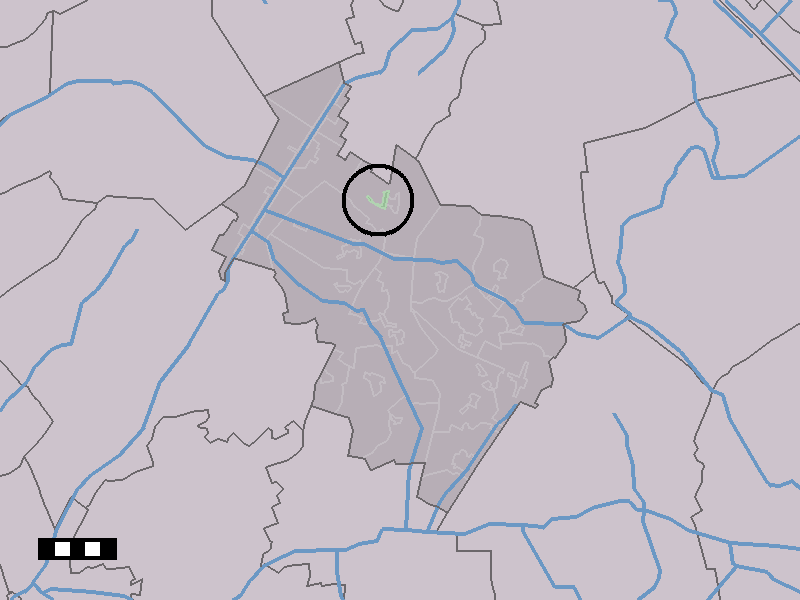
- Laaghalen in the municipality of Midden-Drenthe.

- Location in the Netherlands Laaghalen (Netherlands)
- Coordinates: 52°55′18″N 6°31′52″E
- Country: Netherlands
- Province: Drenthe
- Municipality: Midden-Drenthe

Population (1 January 2004)
  - Total: 100
- Time zone: UTC+1 (CET)
  - Summer (DST): UTC+2 (CEST)
- Dialing code: 0593

Laaghalen is a hamlet in the Dutch province of Drenthe. It is a part of the municipality of Midden-Drenthe, about 9 km south of Assen.

The statistical area "Laaghalen", which can also include the surrounding countryside, has a population of around 90.
