= Laaghalerveen =

- Hamlet
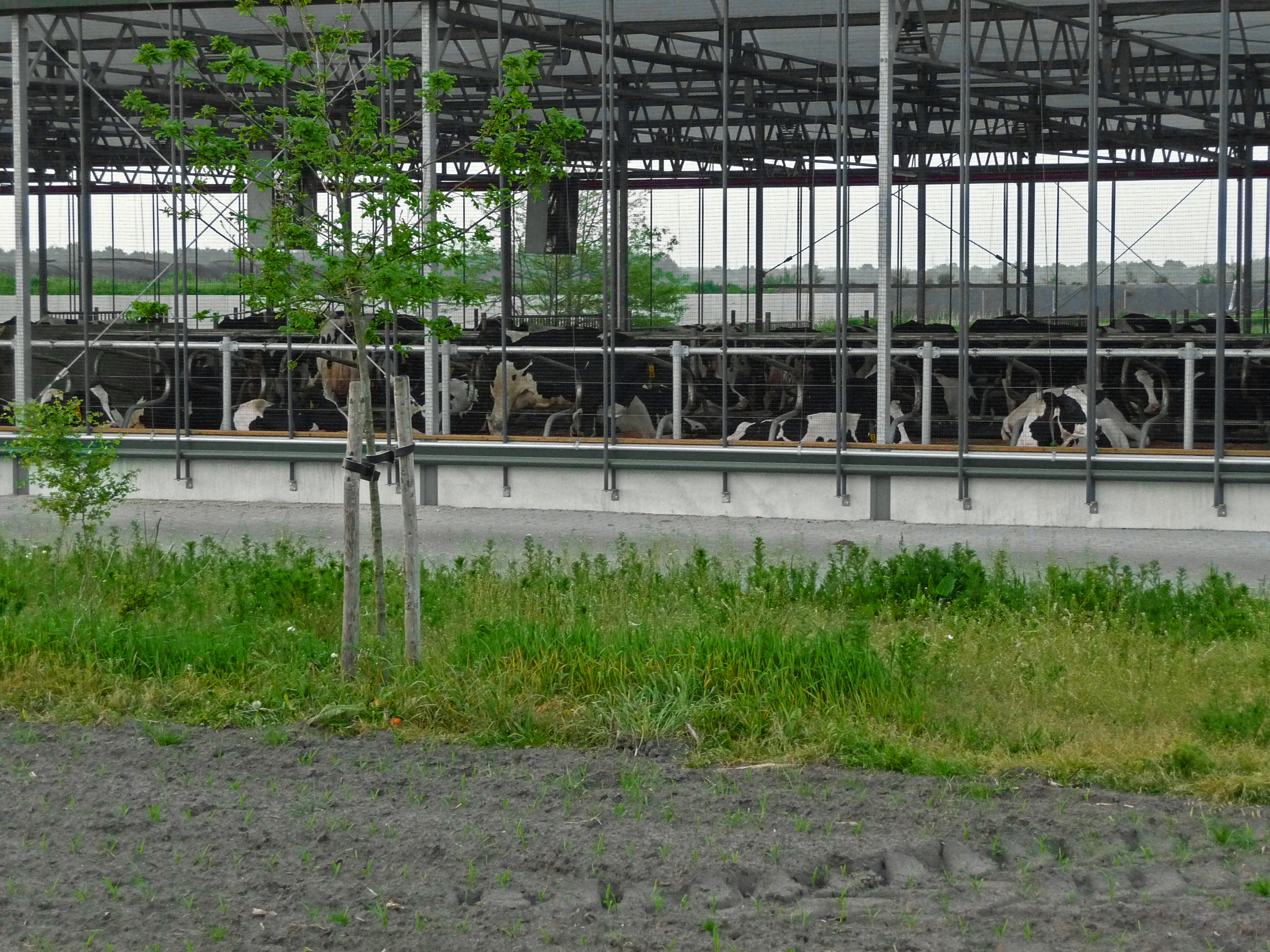
- Cows in an open barn in Laaghalerveen

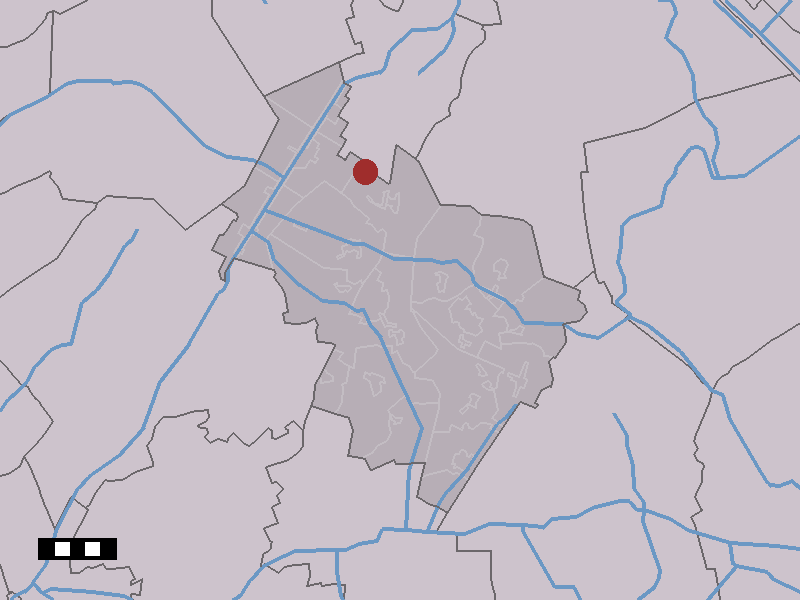
- Laaghalerveen in the municipality of Midden-Drenthe.

- Location in the Netherlands Laaghalerveen (Netherlands)
- Coordinates: 52°56′17″N 6°30′35″E
- Country: Netherlands
- Province: Drenthe
- Municipality: Midden-Drenthe
- Time zone: UTC+1 (CET)
  - Summer (DST): UTC+2 (CEST)
- Dialing code: 0593

Laaghalerveen is a hamlet in the Dutch province of Drenthe. It is a part of the municipality of Midden-Drenthe, and lies about 8 km south of Assen.

== History ==
The village of Laaghalerveen started only about 1870.

== Present day ==
The centre of Laaghalerveen now exists of an old school, a tiny church and a shop all closed. Now there is an ecological camping and art gallery where people can watch graphic arts and be served coffee, tea, beer or wine or get ice cream. The village contains about 40 houses.
