= Berghuis =

Berghuis is a Dutch habitational surname standing for a person from Berghuizen. The surname may refer to the following notable people:

- Bell Berghuis (born 1985), Dutch snowboarder
- Frank Berghuis (born 1967), Dutch football winger
- Jaap Berghuis (1945–2005), Dutch artist
- Megan Berguis, director of the State Library of South Australia from 2024
- Steven Berghuis (born 1991), Dutch football winger
- Thomas Berghuis (born 1973), Dutch art historian

== See also ==
- Berghuis v. Thompkins, a 2010 decision by the United States Supreme Court
