= Hoogersmilde =

- Village
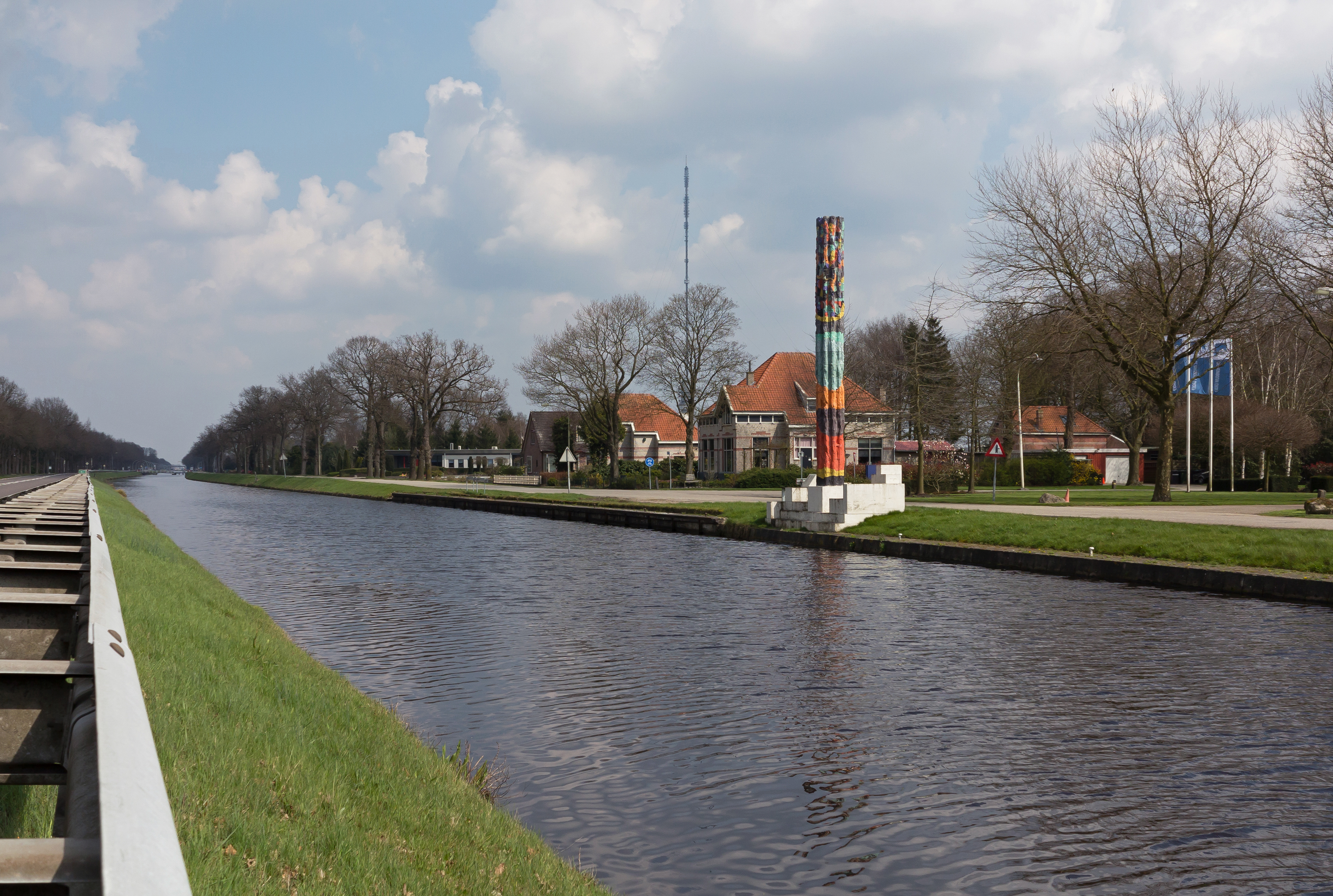
- Hoogersmilde, artwork at the entrance to the sand-lime brick factory

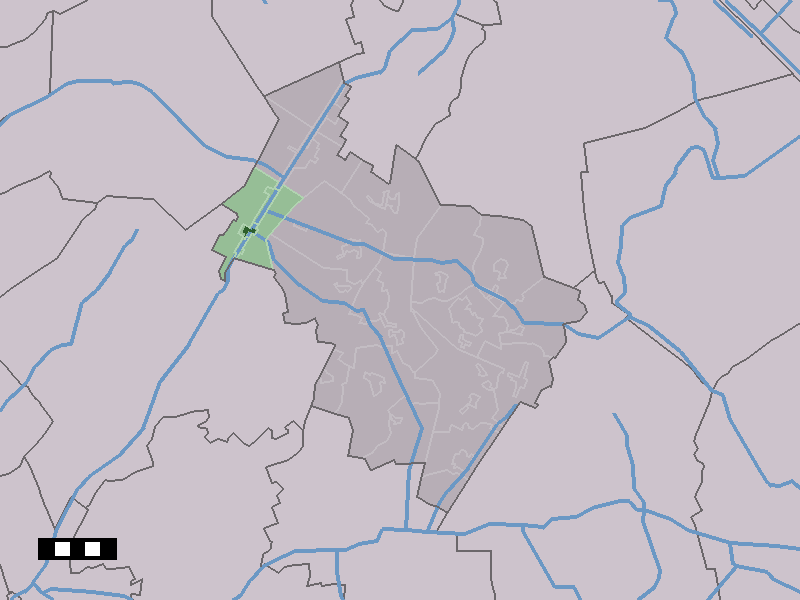
- The town centre (dark green) and the statistical district (light green) of Hoogersmilde in the municipality of Midden-Drenthe.

- Location in the Netherlands Hoogersmilde (Netherlands)
- Coordinates: 52°54′N 6°24′E
- Country: Netherlands
- Province: Drenthe
- Municipality: Midden-Drenthe

Area
  - Total: 20.29 km^{2} (7.83 sq mi)
- Elevation: 13 m (43 ft)

Population (2021)
  - Total: 1,665
  - Density: 82.06/km^{2} (212.5/sq mi)
- Time zone: UTC+1 (CET)
  - Summer (DST): UTC+2 (CEST)
- Postal code: 9422 & 9423
- Dialing code: 0591

Hoogersmilde is a village in the Dutch province of Drenthe. It is a part of the municipality of Midden-Drenthe, and lies about 16 km southwest of Assen.

== History ==
The village was first mentioned in 1634 as Hooge Smilde, and means "high Smilde". In 1614, a large region of raised bog was bought by a group of Amsterdam merchants led by Adriaan Pauw to excavate the peat. In 1634, Adriaan Pauw was made Heer of the Heerlijkheid Smilde, after having acquired the Heerlijkheid in 1633. Hoogersmilde is the oldest settlement and was often referred to as Oude-Smilde. The excavation stagnated around 1730, but resumed after the Drentsche Hoofdvaart was dug between 1767 and 1780.

The Heerlijkheid was dissolved in 1795, and the municipality of Smilde was created with neighbouring Smilde as its capital. The Dutch Reformed church was built in 1845. Hoogersmilde was home to 660 people in 1840.

The Zendstation Smilde is located in Hoogersmilde, it partially collapsed after a fire on 15 July 2011. The Blauwe Meer, an excavation lake, is situated south of Hoogersmilde.

== Education ==
There are two primary schools, De Vaart and Pieter van Thuyl.

== Gallery ==
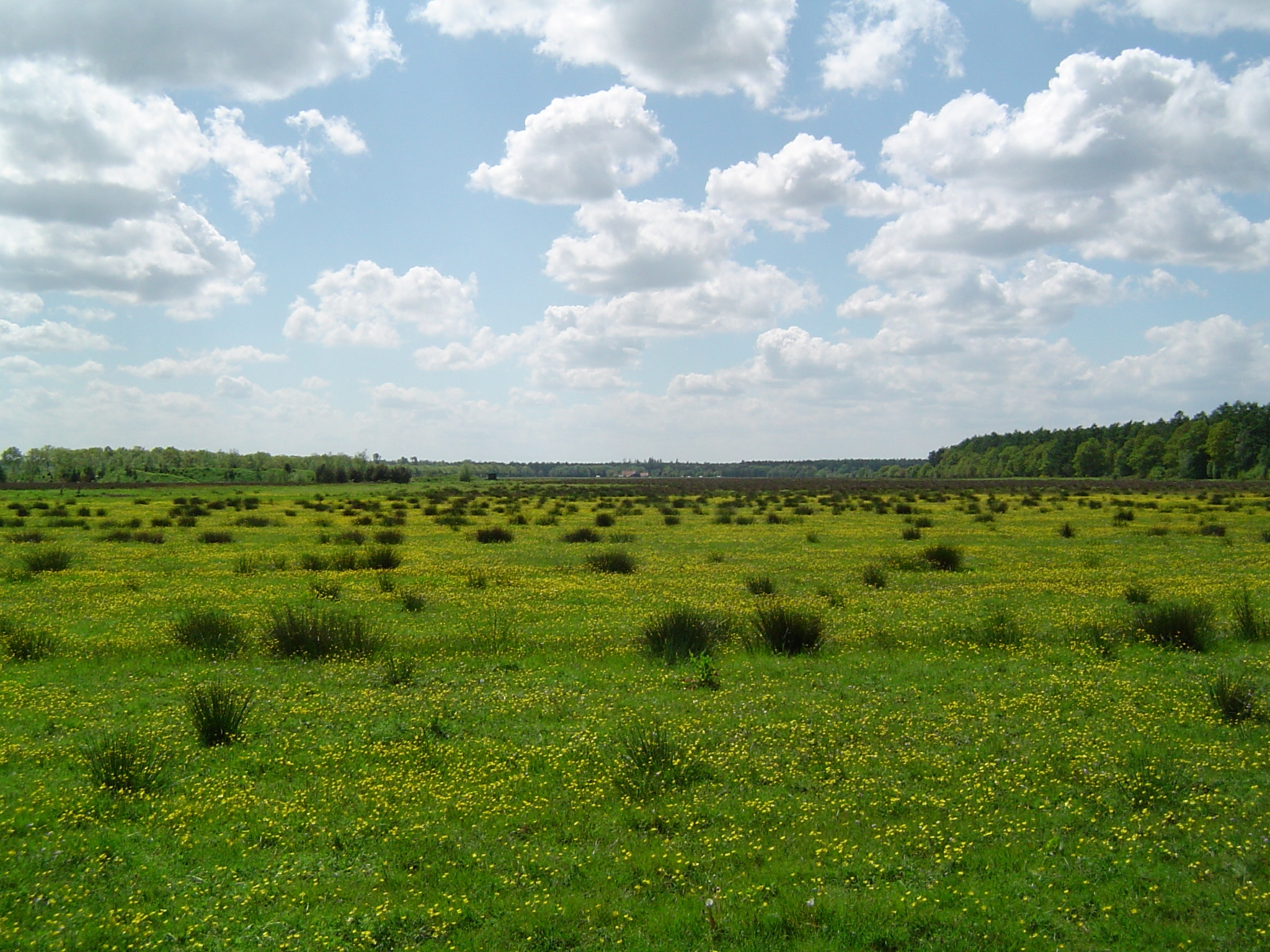
Landscape around Hoogersmilde

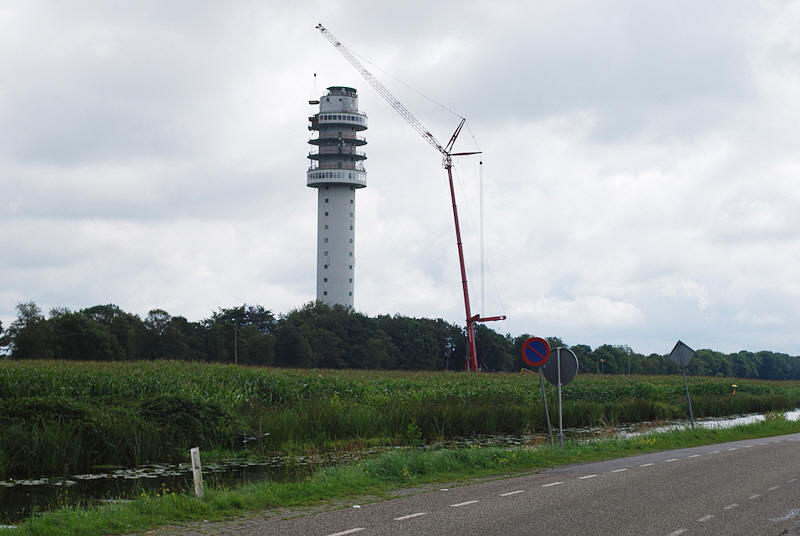
The collapsed tower (2011)

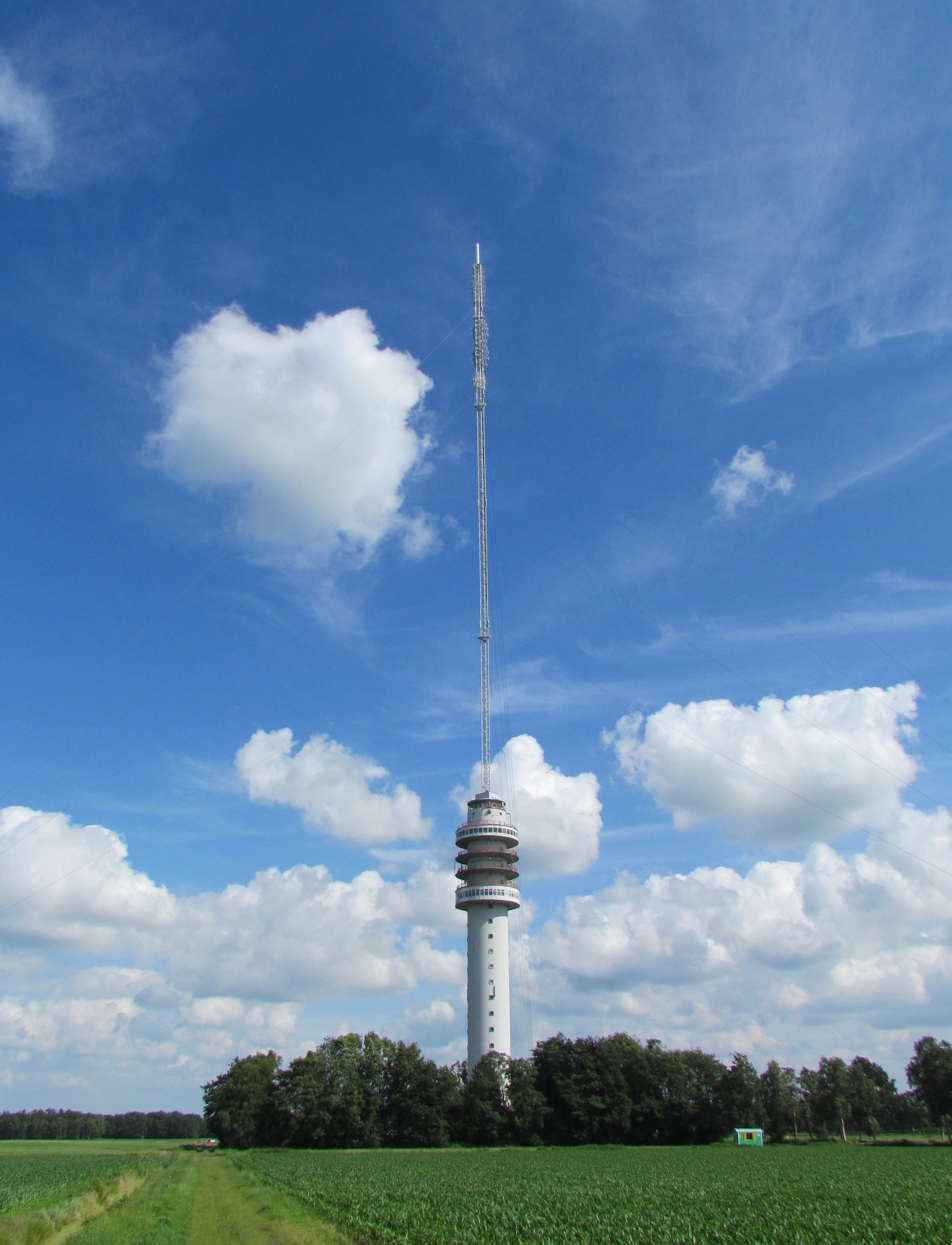
Repaired tower (2012)
