= Jan Beijert =

Dutch politician, director, and columnist

Jan Beijert (1928, Smilde – 23 November 2007, Delfzijl) was a Dutch politician, director and columnist.
