= Carry van Bruggen =

Dutch writer (1881–1932)

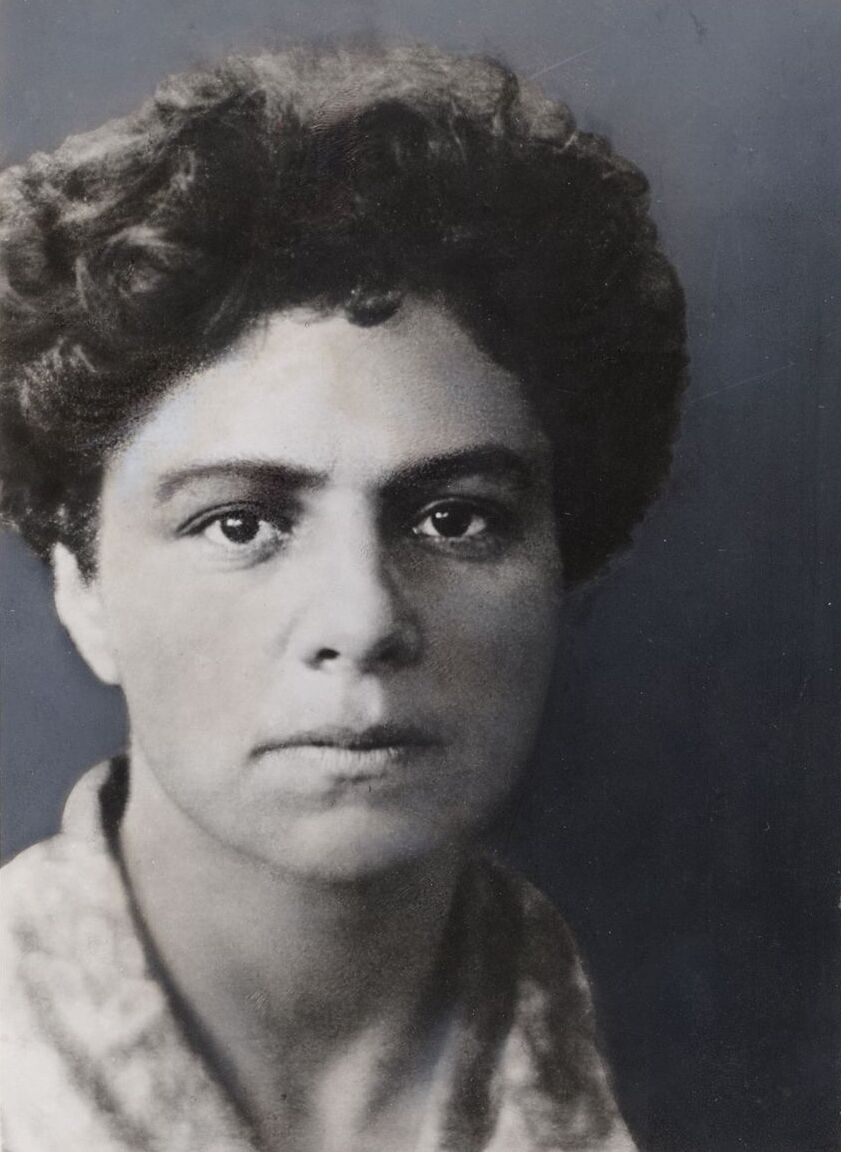
- Born: Caroline Lea de Haan; 1 January 1881 Smilde, Netherlands
- Died: 16 November 1932 (aged 51) Laren, North Holland, Netherlands

Carry van Bruggen (1 January 1881 – 16 November 1932) was a Dutch writer. She also wrote under the name Justine Abbing.

== Biography ==
One of 16 children of Izak de Haan and Betje Rubens, she was born Caroline Lea de Haan in Smilde and grew up in Zaandam, later studying to become a teacher. Her family was Orthodox Jewish, which she found stifling. She was the sister of writer Jacob Israël de Haan. She married Kees van Bruggen, a socialist author, in 1904. She went with her husband to the Dutch East Indies and began writing for the newspapers there. They returned to Amsterdam in 1907 where van Bruggen continued writing for various publications. The couple divorced in 1917; she moved to Laren. In 1920, she married the art historian Adriaan Pit, who was more than twenty years her senior. This was a happier marriage but, after 1928, she frequently had depression and spent time in psychiatric hospitals.

Although supportive of feminist issues, she was skeptical of the feminist movements of her time. Similarly, she had an uneasy relationship with the literary establishment, developing her own writing style and stepping outside of prevailing literary traditions; however her quality already 1928 recognized by the important younger critic Menno Ter Braak. Her contribution to the development of Dutch literature was only truly acknowledged after her death.

Van Bruggen died in Laren at the age of 51 from an overdose of sleeping pills.

== Selected works ==
- De verlatene (The abandoned), novel (1910)
- Heleen, novel (1913)
- Een coquette vrouw (A coquette), novel (1915)
- Prometheus, philosophic essay (1919)
- Uit het leven van een denkende vrouw (From the life of a thinking woman), novel (1920)
- Het huisje aan de sloot (The small house by the ditch), collection of short stories (1921)
- Avontuurtjes (Adventures), novel (1922)
- Vier jaargetijden (Four seasons), novel (1924)
- Hedendaags fetischisme (Contemporary fetishism), commentary (1925)
- Eva, novel (1927)
