= Blauwe Meer =

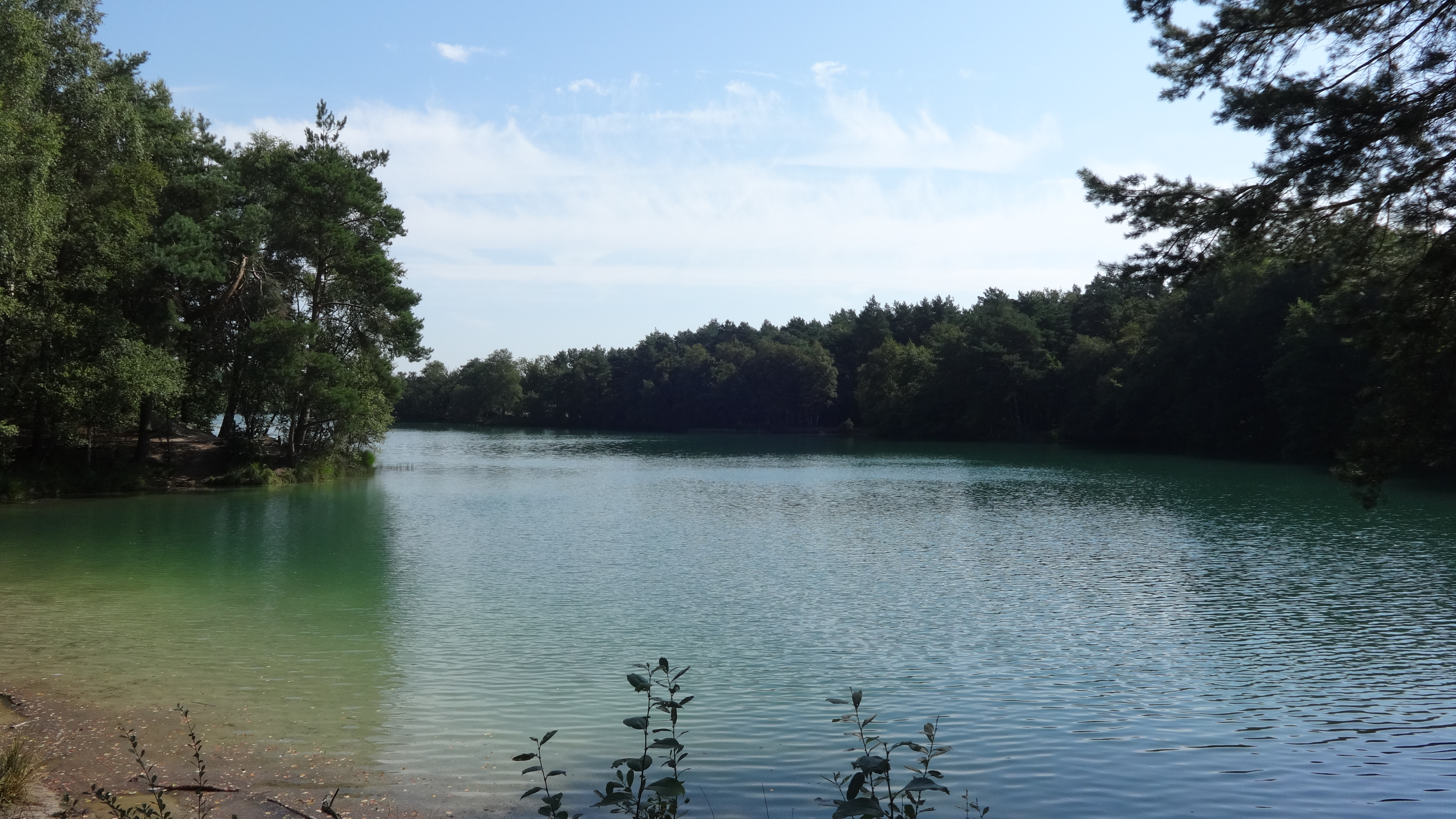
- Blauwe Meer

- Location within Netherlands
- Location: Drenthe, Netherlands
- Coordinates: 52.8830°N 6.4079°E
- Type: artificial lake

The Blauwe Meer (Dutch for "blue lake") is an artificial lake, more precisely an excavation lake, southeast of Hoogersmilde in the province of Drenthe, Netherlands.

In 1905, Roelfsema, a Groningen-based entrepreneur opened a sand-lime brick factory at Hoogersmilde, producing a cheaper alternative to traditional fired brick. The Blauwe Meer was formed by quarrying the sand needed for the brick. It takes its name from glauconite that, along with its depth, gives its water a blue-green tint. Today it used for bathing, with controlled water quality.
