= Adriaan Pit =

Dutch art historian

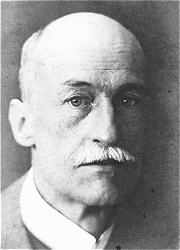
Adriaan Pit (date unknown)

Adriaan Pit, also known as Aart Pit (25 April 1860, The Hague - 24 November 1944, Nijmegen) was a Dutch art historian, museum director, and writer.

== Life and work ==
He was born to August Nicolaas Marinus Pit (1822–1880), a lawyer, and his wife, Elizabeth Jacoba née Mazel (1829–1901). While attending the local gymnasium, he developed an interest in art, inspired by his fellow student, Philip Zilcken, who would later become a painter. After graduating there, he went to Leiden to study law, per his father's wishes. He was, however, an indifferent student, and never graduated. Instead, in 1886, he went to Paris, where he studied art history at the École du Louvre. His primary instructor there was Louis Courajod. In 1890, he published his first work; a catalogue of engravings by his friend, Zilcken. He remained in Paris until 1894, writing articles for Dutch magazines, then returned to the Netherlands. His first full-length book, The Origins of Dutch Art, was published that year.

In 1896, he was appointed Deputy Director at the Nederlandsch Museum voor Geschiedenis en Kunst (Museum of History and Art) in Amsterdam. Two years later, he was promoted to Director. In that position, together with his fellow art historian, Willem Vogelsang, he created the museum's first catalogues. In 1904, he began rearranging the collection and changing the display spaces, which displeased the museum's architect, Pierre Cuypers. Also, his focus was more on aesthetics than cultural-historical content, causing serious disagreements with Victor de Stuers, the museum's founder and a member of Parliament.

Burdened by controversies, he resigned in 1917, to focus more on writing, although he continued to serve as an advisor to the museum. He was also a member of the executive committee of the Rembrandt Association. In 1919, he accepted a position as inspector of the civil engineering schools, which he held until 1926.

In 1920 he married the writer, Carry van Bruggen. He had met her many years before, while attending the meetings of an informal literary group at the Museum Willet-Holthuysen. Their marriage followed his period of recovery from a major operation, during which she had helped nurse him back to health. At that time, she was divorced with two children. In 1928, she became severely depressed. Despite his and her doctors' best efforts, her condition worsened, and she committed suicide with an overdose of sleeping pills, in 1932.

After her death, he returned to The Hague and continued to write. In 1940, he published On Consciousness, his only book unrelated to art. During World War II, in 1943, he was evacuated to Nijmegen, where he died.

== Sources ==
- Biography and references by Monique Daniels @ the Dictionary of Art Historians
- "Pit, Adriaan" by J.F. Heijbroek, In: Biografisch Woordenboek van Nederland Part IV, 1994
- Bernhard Ridderbos, Anne van Buren, Henk van Veen (Eds.), Early Netherlandish Paintings: Rediscovery, Reception, and Research, J. Paul Getty Museum, 2005 ISBN 978-0-89236-816-7
