= Avraham Tehomi =

Jewish Haganah commander (1903–1990)

- אברהם תהומי
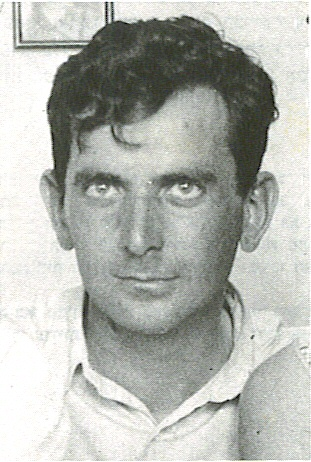
- Born: Avraham Zilberg (אברהם זילברג); April 5, 1903; Odessa, Kherson Governorate, Russian Empire (present-day Ukraine)
- Died: October 12, 1991 (aged 88); British Hong Kong
- Military career
- Allegiance: Haganah; Irgun
- Nickname: Gideon

Avraham Tehomi (Hebrew: אברהם תהומי, also Avraham T'homi, 1903–1991) was a militant who served as a Haganah commander, and was one of the founders and first commander of the Irgun. He is best known for the assassination of Jacob Israël de Haan.

== Biography ==
Avraham Zilberg (later Tehomi) was born in Odessa in the Russian Empire. He immigrated to Mandatory Palestine as a pioneer and started working in road construction. He became a member of the Haganah, completed his Haganah courses with honors, and served as a commander in Jerusalem. As a Haganah officer, he served under the leadership of Yitzhak Ben-Zvi, who would in 1952 become the second President of Israel.

== Pre-state underground ==
On June 30, 1924, the Dutch Jewish poet, novelist and diplomat Jacob Israel de Haan, who was living in Jerusalem as a journalist, was shot and killed. Tehomi was allegedly responsible for the assassination. De Haan had come to Palestine as an ardent Zionist, but he had become increasingly critical of the Zionist organizations as he favored a negotiated solution to the struggle between Jews and Arabs. The murder shocked Palestine and Europe, and the British authorities offered a reward for information that would lead to the arrest of the assassin, but the killer was not caught. In an interview for Israeli television over 40 years later, Tehomi confessed to killing de Haan to Israeli journalists Shlomo Nakdimon and Shaul Mayzlish. He openly stated: "I have done what the Haganah decided had to be done. And nothing was done without the order of Yitzhak Ben-Zvi. I have no regrets because he [de Haan] wanted to destroy our whole idea of Zionism."

In 1925, Tehomi was appointed deputy commander of the Jerusalem District Haganah and served as District Commander from 1929 to 1931.

The 1929 Palestine riots caused unrest in the Haganah ranks because the organization was not ready and did not respond appropriately to the Arab attacks. The disputes on this issue led to Tehomi's departure from the Haganah, and the establishment, in 1931, of the Haganah Bet, a parallel Zionist organisation that would later become the Irgun, which was more prepared to use violence, and which Tehomi headed. That same year, he left Palestine for the United States on private business, but when he stopped over at Piraeus, his visa was canceled by the US consul for medical reasons, and he returned to Palestine. Tehomi later tried to reunite the two organizations and in 1937 returned to the Haganah in order to take up a senior position. However, approximately only half of the 3,000 fighters of the Irgun followed Tehomi back into the Haganah. The other half retained the Irgun as a separate fighting organization, engaging in conflict with both British and Arabs in Palestine. When the Haganah failed to fulfill its obligations under the amalgamation agreement, Tehomi resigned, and from then on allegedly engaged in independent illegal immigration activities and intelligence work. Several years later he retired from all activity.

== Later life ==
In 1945, Tehomi immigrated to the United States with his wife, where they entered the international trade in precious stones. He remained there until 1968, when he returned to Israel and established a gem-polishing plant in Jerusalem. In the final years of his life, he lived in Hong Kong, where he died in 1991.
