= Jacob Israël de Haan =

Dutch-Jewish lawyer and writer (1881–1924)

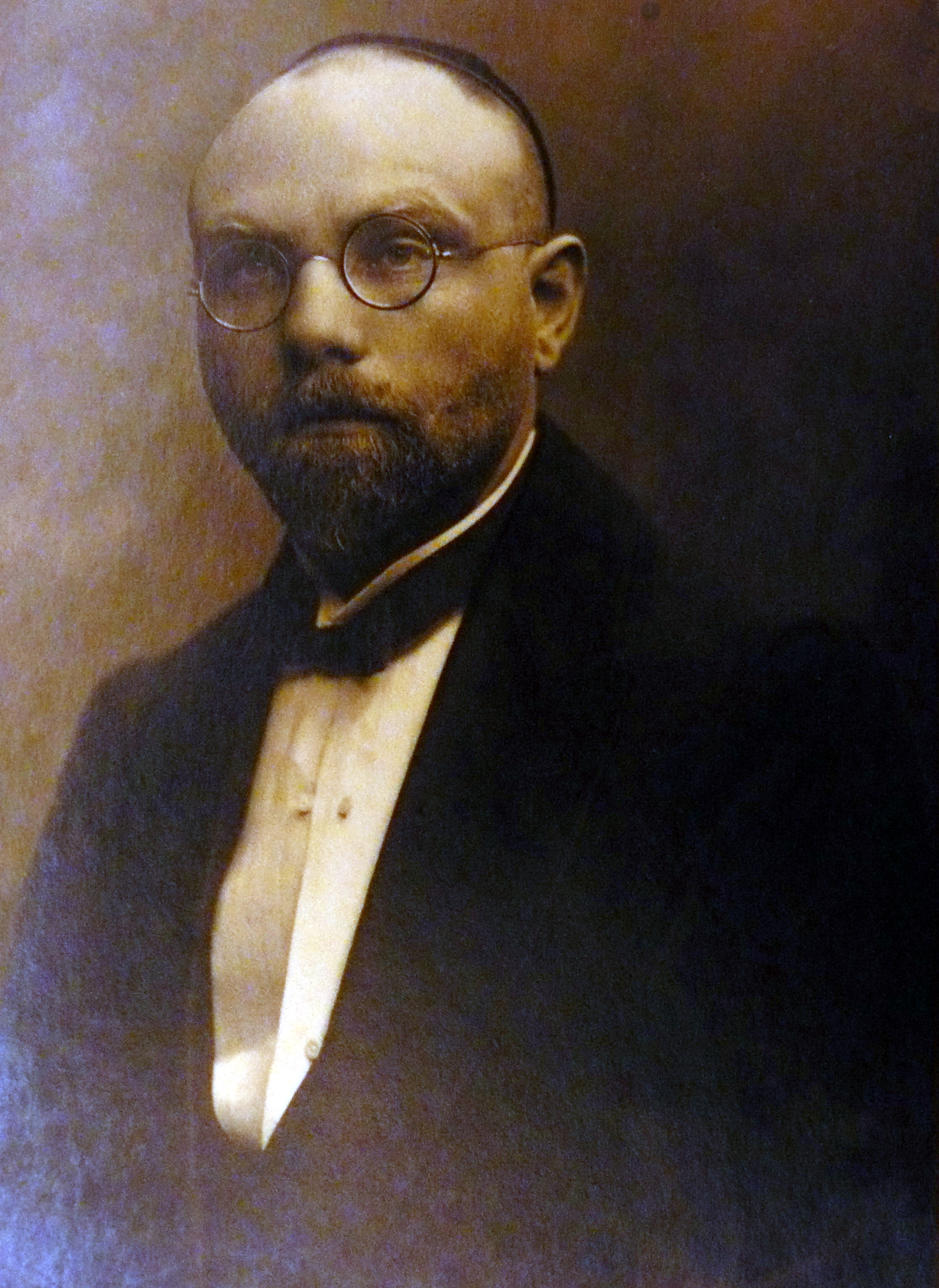
- Born: 31 December 1881; Smilde, Netherlands
- Died: 30 June 1924 (aged 42); Jerusalem
- Cause of death: Assassination
- Occupations: writer; journalist; lawyer

Jacob Israël de Haan (31 December 1881 – 30 June 1924) was a Dutch Jewish writer, poet, journalist, and political activist. First known for Pijpelijntjes (1904), the earliest Dutch novel to portray a homosexual relationship, he later became noted for his journalism, his studies of Russian prisons, and his poetry.

After embracing Zionism, he moved to Jerusalem in 1919, where he gradually became the leading political spokesman of the Haredi community and a vocal opponent of the Zionist leadership. De Haan’s attempts to negotiate with Arab leaders and the British authorities made him a controversial figure, and he was assassinated by the Zionist paramilitary organisation Haganah in 1924, the first political killing within the Jewish community in Mandatory Palestine. His literary work and political legacy remain the subject of ongoing debate.

== Early life ==
De Haan was born in Smilde, a village in the northern province of Drenthe, into a large and poor orthodox Jewish family. He was said to be one of eighteen children His father, Izak de Haan, served as a hazzan and religious teacher in small congregations, which forced the family to move frequently in search of income. When he was six, the family settled in Zaandam, where the Jewish community was small but maintained a synagogue, school, and kosher butchers. De Haan grew up in a devout environment and later recalled both attachment and discomfort in his childhood there.

He studied to became a teacher at a teacher training college in Haarlem, and worked as a teacher afterwards at several schools. As a student, he broke with his religious upbringing largely due to his homosexuality, started reading the Tachtigers literature of Frederik van Eeden and Herman Gorter and became a socialist. He joined the Social Democratic Workers' Party and edited the children's section of the socialist newspaper Het Volk. His sister, the writer Carry van Bruggen, also contributed to this newspaper.

After moving to Amsterdam in 1902, he discovered writers of the Decadent movement such as Arthur Rimbaud, Paul Verlaine and Jan Eekhout. In 1904 he wrote the novel Pijpelijntjes ("Lines from De Pijp"), which was the first book written in Dutch to depict a relationship between two men. The book falsely pretends to be a thinly veiled version of his own gay life with Arnold Aletrino in Amsterdam's "Pijp" working-class district. The homo-eroticism of the book, shocking to readers in the early 20th century, led to his dismissal from his teaching job and social-democratic political circles. Het Volk stopped collaborating with him after the publication of the novel. De Haan's acquaintances bought almost the entire print run of the book, to keep a lid on the scandal. A new homo-erotic novel about a sadomasochist relationship between two men, Pathologieën, made it even more difficult for him to find a job.

In 1907, he married Johanna van Maarseveen (1873–1946), a non-Jewish doctor eight years older than him. They separated in 1919, but never officially divorced.

He left socialism behind, studied law and became a private lecturer at the University of Amsterdam, traveled to England and Russia and published poems in the magazine of Albert Verwey. In 1912, de Haan visited a number of prisons in Russia, in order to study the situation of political prisoners. He published his findings in his book In Russische gevangenissen (In Russian prisons, 1913). He also founded a committee, together with writer Frederik van Eeden and Dutch poet Henriette Roland Holst, which aimed at collecting signatures for the sake of inducing especially Russia's then allies France and Great Britain to exert pressure on Russia to alleviate the fate of the prisoners. In a publication of Amnesty International he was, because of these activities, described as "a precursor of Amnesty International".

== Move to Palestine ==
=== Zionist beginnings ===
Around 1910, De Haan returned to the Jewish religion and started to learn Hebrew. He developed an interest in Zionism, joining in 1915 the Mizrachi, the religious branch of the Zionist Organization.

This is a description of de Haan prior to his departure for Palestine:

In 1919, two years after the Balfour Declaration, this Poet of the Jewish Song took the next logical step and emigrated to Palestine "anxious to work at rebuilding Land, People and Language" as De Haan put it to Chaim Weizmann in his application for a passport. The same letter assumed his stance with aplomb. False modesty was never one of his faults... De Haan wrote: "I am not leaving Holland to improve my condition. Neither materially, nor intellectually will life in Palestine be equal to my life here. I am one of the best poets of my Generation, and the only important Jewish national poet Holland has ever had. It is difficult to give up all this."... The Palestine De Haan entered on a bitter stormy winter day in January 1919 was above all an intricate country. Arguably it had the most confusing political conditions of that politically complicated moment when the Versailles Peace Conference was about to begin. One might call it a natural habitat for this cranky man. It was the "twice promised country," to the Arabs in the Arab Revolt T. E. Lawrence existentialised in The Seven Pillars of Wisdom, and to the Jews (or rather in practice the Zionists) by the Balfour Declaration calling for creation of a "Jewish homeland". De Haan arrived there as an ardent, even fanatical, Zionist. Indeed, the first secret Zionist report about him refers to his ranting anti-Arab remarks made at a party...

=== Religious and anti-Zionist phase ===
De Haan moved to Jerusalem in 1919 as correspondent of the Algemeen Handelsblad, one of the leading Dutch dailies. He also taught at a new law school, the Jerusalem Law Classes, established by the Government of Palestine in 1920. He was one of the defenders of members of the Zionist para-military group Haganah who had attacked Arabs in Jaffa.

De Haan rapidly became more religiously committed, and was angered by Zionist refusals to cooperate with Arabs.

At first he aligned himself with religious Zionism and the Mizrachi movement, but after meeting Rabbi Yosef Chaim Sonnenfeld, leader of the ultra-conservative Haredi Jewish community, he became the political spokesman of the Haredim in Jerusalem. He was elected political secretary of the Orthodox community council, Vaad Ha'ir. De Haan endeavoured to obtain an agreement with Arab nationalist leaders to allow unrestricted Jewish immigration into Palestine in exchange for a Jewish declaration forgoing the Balfour Declaration.

During this time it is alleged that he continued to have relationships with young men, including Arabs from east Jerusalem. In one of his poems he asks himself whether his visits to the Wailing Wall were motivated by a desire for God or for the young Arab men there. In Jerusalem, de Haan formed a close relationship with Adil Effendi (1900–1963), who became his companion, Arabic teacher, and lover. Effendi, about twenty years younger, accompanied de Haan on rides, walks, and travels, and de Haan rented a house from Effendi’s family in the Old City. Although he publicly referred to Effendi as a “friend,” his Quatrains poems portray a deeper emotional and erotic attachment. These poems draw on amrad and ghulām motifs from Arabic and Ottoman homoerotic traditions, which idealized beardless youths and were common in regional poetry. Scholar Nathan Witt situates de Haan's sexuality within a broader Orientalist dynamic.

The secular Zionist establishment would not allow the established Haredi community in Palestine to be represented in the Jewish Agency in the 1920s. In response, the Haredim founded a branch of the Agudath Israel political organisation in Jerusalem to represent their interests in Mandate Palestine. The leader at the time, Rabbi Yosef Chaim Sonnenfeld, chose de Haan to organise and represent the Haredi position as their foreign minister, on a diplomatic level equal to that of the secular Zionists. When in February 1922 Lord Northcliffe, the most influential British publisher, visited Palestine, De Haan presented the case of Palestine's Haredim and how they felt oppressed by the Zionists.

He spoke about the tyranny of the official Zionist movement, which the journalists of the Northcliffe party gleefully reported back home. (...) the Zionist authorities both in Palestine and London became very worried. There was a great potential danger from these critical reports from a Jew who actually lived and worked right on this hot spot.

De Haan, speaking on behalf of Agudath Israel, even opposed the British authorities allocating separate benefits to the Zionist-led Yishuv. From 1922, he suffered persisting harassment including death threats and being spat on by Zionists, and his class at the Law School demanded his dismissal.

De Haan was invited several times to visit Emir Abdullah, the future king of independent Transjordan. In March 1924, De Haan and rabbi Sonnenfeld travelled to Amman for an audience with Abdullah's father and top Hashemite leader, Emir Hussein bin Ali. They sought their support for the Old Yishuv (the pre-Zionist Jewish community in the Holy Land), and explained the Haredi Jewish opposition to the Zionist plans of founding a state and support for the establishment of an official Palestinian state within the Emirate of Transjordan as part of a federation. In April, De Haan met Hussein again and reported that the Caliph condemned "godless" Zionism and would mobilize the Islamic world against it"; however, De Haan's top rival Frederick Hermann Kisch obtained a retraction from Hussein, which De Haan was forced to publish. De Haan made plans to travel to London in July 1924 with an anti-Zionist Haredi delegation to argue against Zionism.

== Assassination ==
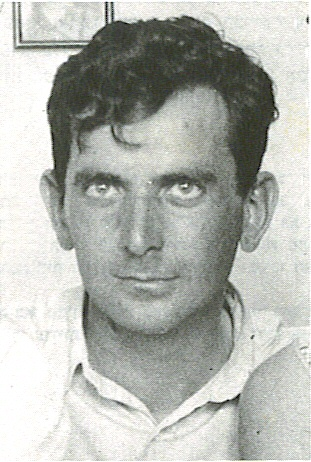
Avraham Tehomi, assassin of Jacob Israël de Haan under command of Yitzhak Ben-Zvi.

Shortly before leaving for London, De Haan was assassinated in Jerusalem by the Haganah on the early morning of 30 June 1924. As he exited the synagogue at the Shaare Zedek Hospital on Jaffa Road, Avraham Tehomi approached him and asked for the time. Tehomi shot him three times and ran away from the scene. De Haan died minutes later.

At first, the Palestinian Jewish society, the Yishuv, readily accepted the theory that the assassination had to be blamed on Arabs. They did not doubt the Zionist leadership's assurances that it had played no part in it. With time, doubts started arising.

In 1952, Yosef Hecht, the first commander of the main Zionist pre-state para-military organisation, the Haganah, told the official Haganah historian in a testimony what had actually occurred. In order to stop De Haan's planned anti-Zionist activity in London, Hecht discussed the issue with Zechariah Urieli, the Haganah commander in Jerusalem. They decided to assassinate De Haan. Two Haganah members, Avraham Tehomi and Avraham Krichevsky, were selected for the task. Hecht did not inform the Yishuv's civilian leadership until after the assassination, when he contacted Yitzhak Ben-Zvi, a senior member of the National Council. Hecht stated that "he did not regret it and would do it again." Before the facts were published, journalist Liel Leibovitz wrote that, while the identity of exactly who ordered the assassination was unknown, "there's little doubt that many in the senior Zionist leadership in Jerusalem knew about the proposal to kill de Haan – and that none objected."

The 1985 publication of De Haan: The first political assassination in Palestine, by Shlomo Nakdimon and Shaul Mayzlish, revived wider interest in his assassination. Nakdimon and Mayzlish were able to trace Tehomi, then a businessman living in Hong Kong. When interviewed for Israeli TV by Nakdimon, Tehomi said that Yitzhak Ben-Zvi, who later became the second President of Israel (1952–1963), must have ordered the assassination: "I have done what the Haganah decided had to be done. And nothing was done without the order of Yitzhak Ben-Zvi... I have no regrets because he (De Haan) wanted to destroy our whole idea of Zionism." Tehomi denied allegations that De Haan's assassination was related to his homosexuality: "I neither heard nor knew about this", adding "Why is it someone's business what he does at his home?"

According to Gert Hekma, Zionists spread a rumour that De Haan had been killed by Arabs because of his sexual relations with Arab boys.

=== Aftermath ===
De Haan was buried on the Mount of Olives. His funeral was attended by hundreds of Haredim, along with Zionist and British representatives. Following the funeral, many Haredim ventured into the city center to confront Zionists, and were barely restrained by the police.

The headquarters of Agudath Israel received condolences from the British Palestine government, the French and Spanish consuls in Jerusalem, and various cables from around the world. In New York, ultra-Orthodox Jews circulated Yiddish leaflets praising De Haan and condemning "Torahless Zionists, who use violence to enslave the pious." The British authorities offered a reward for information leading to the arrest of the killer, but Tehomi was never caught. A young pioneer named Yaakov Gussman was briefly detained by the British police on suspicion of carrying out the assassination, but released for lack of evidence.

The assassination caused shock in Palestine and Europe. Senior Zionist leaders, among them David Ben-Gurion, blamed each other. There was widespread speculation as to the identity of the assassin, with the theories postulated including him being a Zionist, a Haredi enraged over the revelations of De Haan's homosexuality, or an "Arab lover".

De Haan's murder is considered the first political murder in the Jewish community in Palestine. His activities were perceived as undermining the struggle for the establishment of a Jewish state, but the assassination sparked a controversy and was harshly condemned by some. Labor movement publicist Moshe Beilinson called the murder a moral breakdown of the Yishuv.

== Posterity ==
German author Arnold Zweig published a book in 1932 based on De Haan's life called De Vriendt kehrt heim (English title De Vriendt Goes Home).

When, in 1949, the first Dutch ambassador to the State of Israel presented his credentials, Israeli president Chaim Weizmann stated Dutch Jews had made an excellent contribution to their cause except for De Haan.

In Neturei Karta circles De Haan is considered a martyr, killed by secular Jews while protecting the Jewish religion. A pilgrimage to his grave is held every year on the anniversary of his death. Nevertheless, some Haredim recoil from his homosexuality, his religious questioning, and his attempted coalition with the Arab nationalists. During the 1980s, the Neturei Karta community in Jerusalem tried to change the name of the Zupnik Garden to commemorate De Haan.

=== Netherlands ===
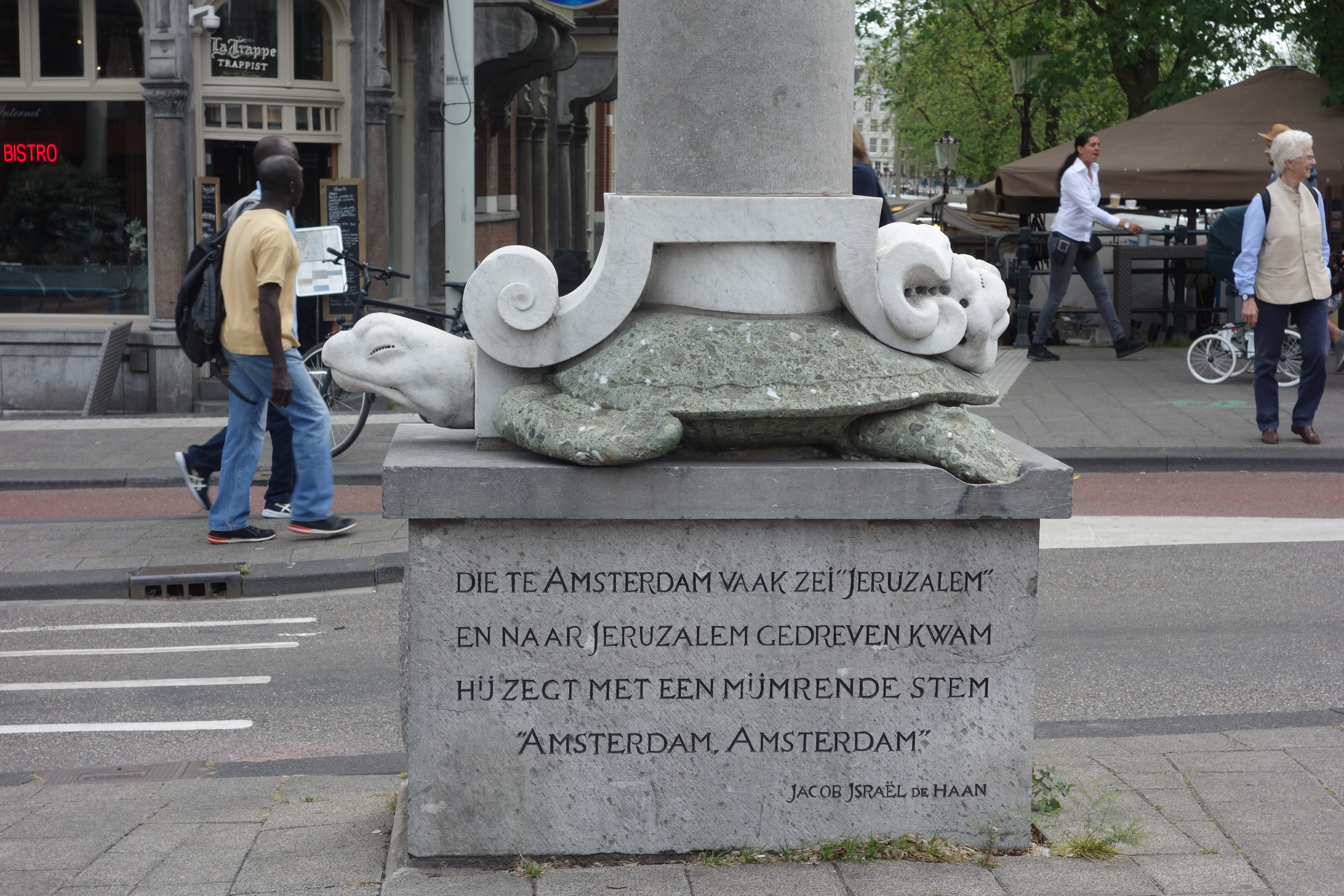
Poem by De Haan on a sculpture in Amsterdam that reads: He who in Amsterdam often said "Jerusalem" And to Jerusalem came driven, He says with a wistful voice: "Amsterdam, Amsterdam"

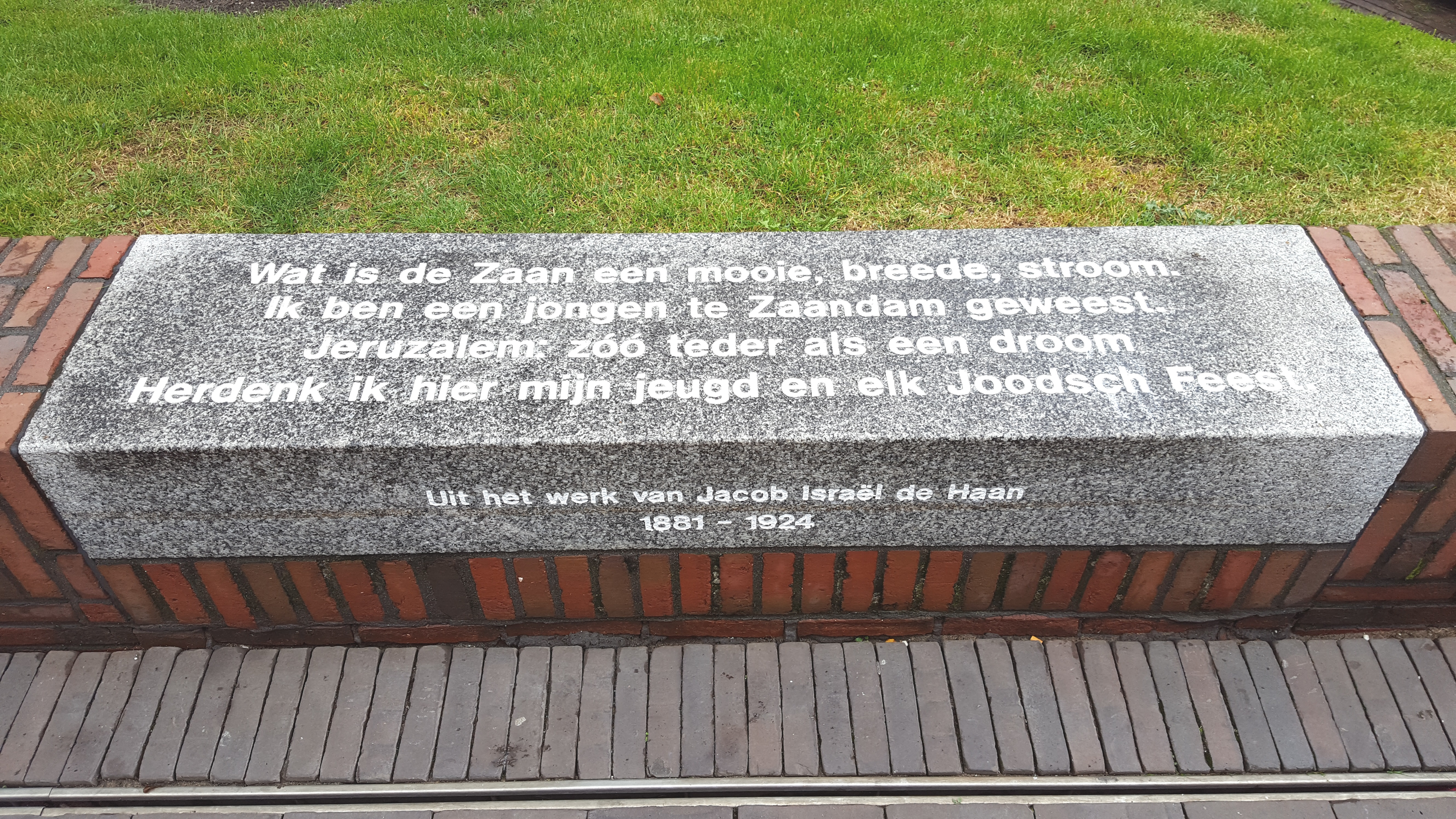
A memorial to de Haan in Zaandam

Although De Haan's fame waned after his death, his works have been published and reprinted. After his murder, his estate was transferred to his friend Mosche Wallach, who shipped it to the Netherlands, presumably to De Haan's widow Johanna van Maarseveen. In 1934, the latter met a Zionist called David Koker, who admired De Haan's work in spite of his political opinions, and she chose him as De Haan's literary executor. During the Nazi occupation of the Netherlands, Koker managed to publish De Haan's Brieven uit Jeruzalem ('Letters from Jerusalem') in a small book. Following Koker's and Van Maarseveen's deaths, De Haan's archive was transferred to Karel van het Reve, who in turn deposited it at the Bibliotheca Rosenthaliana of the University of Amsterdam.

In 1949, a committee was founded to publish a collected edition of the poems, which followed in 1952. A 'Society Jacob Israël de Haan' furthered other publications: philosophical aphorisms and letters, and a memoir by his sister Mies de Haan.

In the 1960s two attempts at a biography were published. After 1970 a revival of interest in De Haan brought more publicity, stimulating new editions of his works. Many of his publications about law and significs have been reprinted, as were his novels, and his earlier prose has been rescued from obscure magazines. Dozens of bibliophile editions honoured his poems and prose sketches. Many magazine articles and other publications about his life were published, and generated heated debates. A large volume of his correspondence (only of the period 1902–1908), published in 1994, shed a bright light on his life. In 2015 a comprehensive 685-page Dutch-language biography written by Dutch academic and literary critic Joop Fontijn was published by De Bezige Bij in Amsterdam under the title "Onrust. Het leven van Jacob Israël de Haan".

Through the years, in the Netherlands there have been projects, festivals and theatre productions commemorating Jacob Israël de Haan's work and life. A line from De Haan's poem "To a Young Fisherman": "For friendship such a limitless longing...", is inscribed on one of the three sides of the Homomonument in Amsterdam.

== Publications ==
=== Poetry ===
- 1900–1908 De Haan published poetry in several magazines during these years. These early poems however have never been collected in a book
- 1914 – Libertijnsche liederen ('Libertine songs')
- 1915 – Het Joodsche lied. Eerste boek ('Jewish song, first book')
- 1917 – Liederen ('Songs')
- 1919 – Een nieuw Carthago ('A new Carthage', Carthage being a metaphor for Antwerp in this case)
- 1921 – Het Joodsche lied. Tweede boek ('Jewish song, second book')
- 1924 – Kwatrijnen ('Quatrains')
- 1952 – Verzamelde gedichten ('Collected poems'); complete poetry 1909–1924 in two volumes, edited by K. Lekkerkerker
- 1982 – Ik ben een jongen te Zaandam geweest ('I was a boy in Zaandam'), anthology edited by Gerrit Komrij

=== Prose ===
- 1904 – Pijpelijntjes (last reprint 2006)
- 1904 – Kanalje ('Rabble'; reprint 1977)
- 1907 – Ondergangen ('Perditions'; reprint 1984)
- 1905–1910 - Nerveuze vertellingen ('Nervous Tales', published in various magazines, first collected in 1983)
- 1907–1910 – Besliste volzinnen ('Decided Sentences', aphorisms published in magazines, collected for the first time in 1954)
- 1908 – Pathologieën. De ondergang van Johan van Vere de With ('Pathologies. The Perdition of Johan van Vere de With'; last reprint 2003)

=== Law ===
- 1916 – Wezen en taak der rechtskundige significa. Inaugural address
- 1916 – Rechtskundige significa en hare toepassing op de begrippen: 'aansprakelĳk, verantwoordelĳk, toerekeningsvatbaar (dissertatie)
- 1919 – Rechtskundige significa

=== Journalism ===
- 1913 – In Russische gevangenissen ('In Russian Prisons')
- From Palestine De Haan sent many sketches and articles to the Dutch newspaper Algemeen Handelsblad. These never have been completely published in book form, but there are several collections:
- 1922 – Jeruzalem
- 1925 – Palestina with an introduction by Carry van Bruggen
- 1941 – Brieven uit Jeruzalem edited by David Koker ('Letters from Jerusalem')
- 1981 – Jacob Israël de Haan – correspondent in Palestina, 1919–1924. Collected and edited by Ludy Giebels

=== Correspondence ===
- 1994 – Brieven van en aan Jacob Israël de Haan 1899–1908. Edited by Rob Delvigne and Leo Ross

== See also ==
- Edah HaChareidis
- Haim Arlosoroff
- History of the Jews in the Netherlands
- Notable Dutch Jews
- Zionist political violence
