= Smilde =

- Town
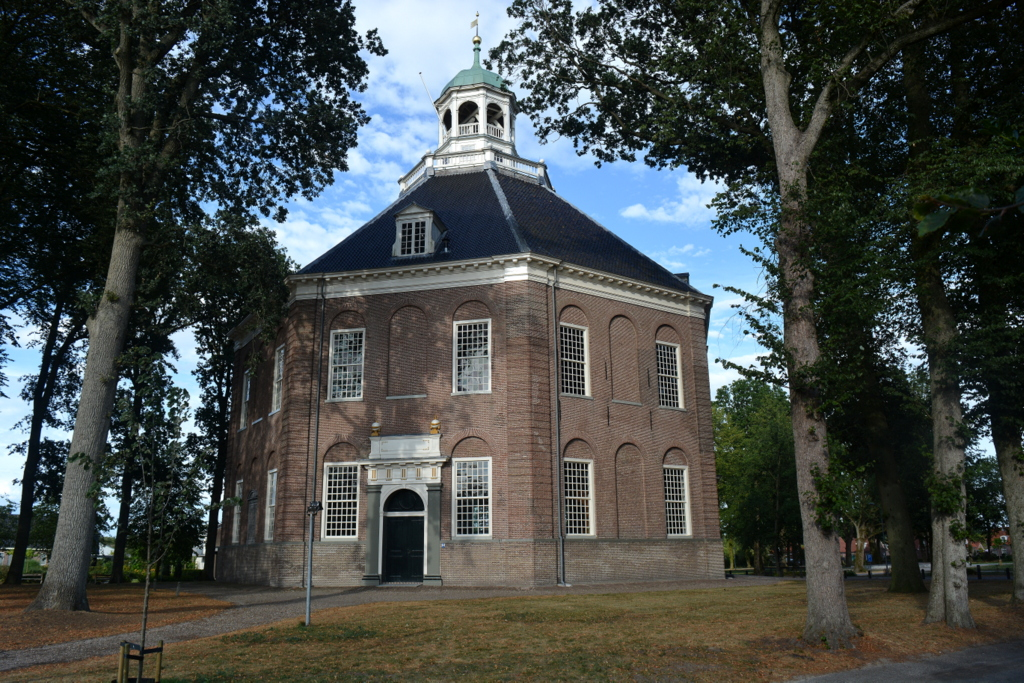
- Church in Smilde

- Flag Coat of arms

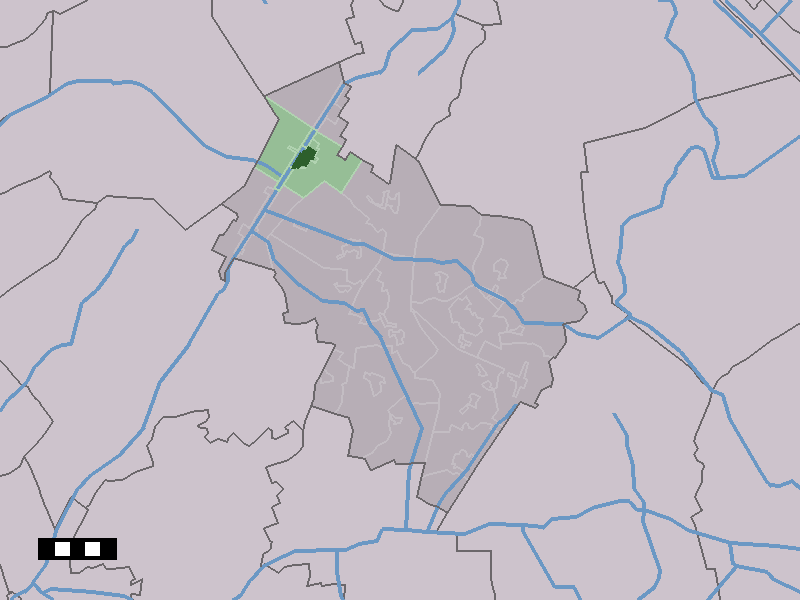

- Location in the Netherlands Smilde (Netherlands)
- Coordinates: 52°56′55″N 6°26′54″E
- Country: Netherlands
- Province: Drenthe
- Municipality: Midden-Drenthe

Area
  - Total: 22.96 km^{2} (8.86 sq mi)
- Elevation: 14 m (46 ft)

Population (2021)
  - Total: 4,500
  - Density: 200/km^{2} (510/sq mi)
- Time zone: UTC+1 (CET)
  - Summer (DST): UTC+2 (CEST)
- Postal code: 9422
- Dialing code: 0592

Smilde is a town in the Netherlands' northern province of Drenthe and lies about 10 kilometers (6.2 mi) southwest of the province capital of Assen. Smilde was a separate municipality until 1998, when it became a part of Middenveld. However, that name changed in 2000 and was renamed the municipality of Midden-Drenthe.

== History ==
The village was first mentioned in 1846 as Smilde. The etymology is unclear. Smilde is an elongated canal village which developed around 1770. Between 1767 and 1780, the Drentsche Hoofdvaart was dug to excavate the peat in the area. The first settlement was called Kloosterveen and was later renamed to Smilde.

The Dutch Reformed church was built between 1780 and 1788 in Louis XVI style. It was restored in 1963. The former town hall was originally built as a villa in Renaissance Revival style and was named Villa Maria. In 1931, it became town hall.

Smilde was home to 1,675 people in 1840. Smilde was an independent municipality until 1998 when it was merged into Midden-Drenthe.

== Education ==
There are two primary schools, De Schutkampen and Prinses Margriet (Princess Margriet of the Netherlands).

== People from Smilde ==
- Jan Beijert (1928–2007), politician
- Jaap Berghuis (1945–2005), painter
- Carry van Bruggen-de Haan (1881–1932), writer
- Jacob Israël de Haan (1881–1924), anti-Zionist and ultra-Orthodox activist
- Hendrikje van Andel-Schipper (1890–2005), oldest person from the Netherlands, aged 115 at the time of her death
- Alwin Kloekhorst (b. 1978), Indo-Europeanist and Hittitologist at the University of Leiden

== Gallery ==
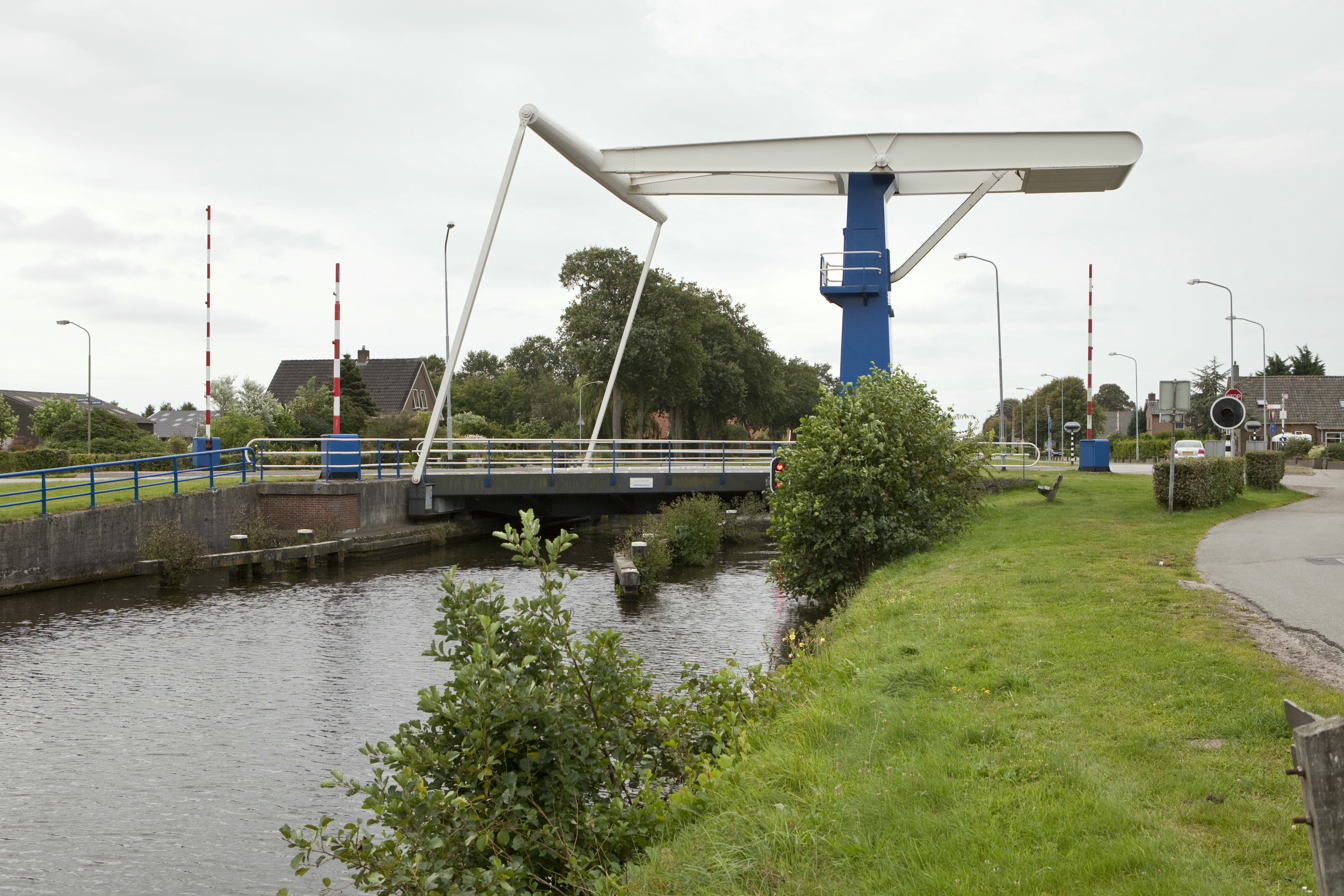
Draw bridge of Smilde

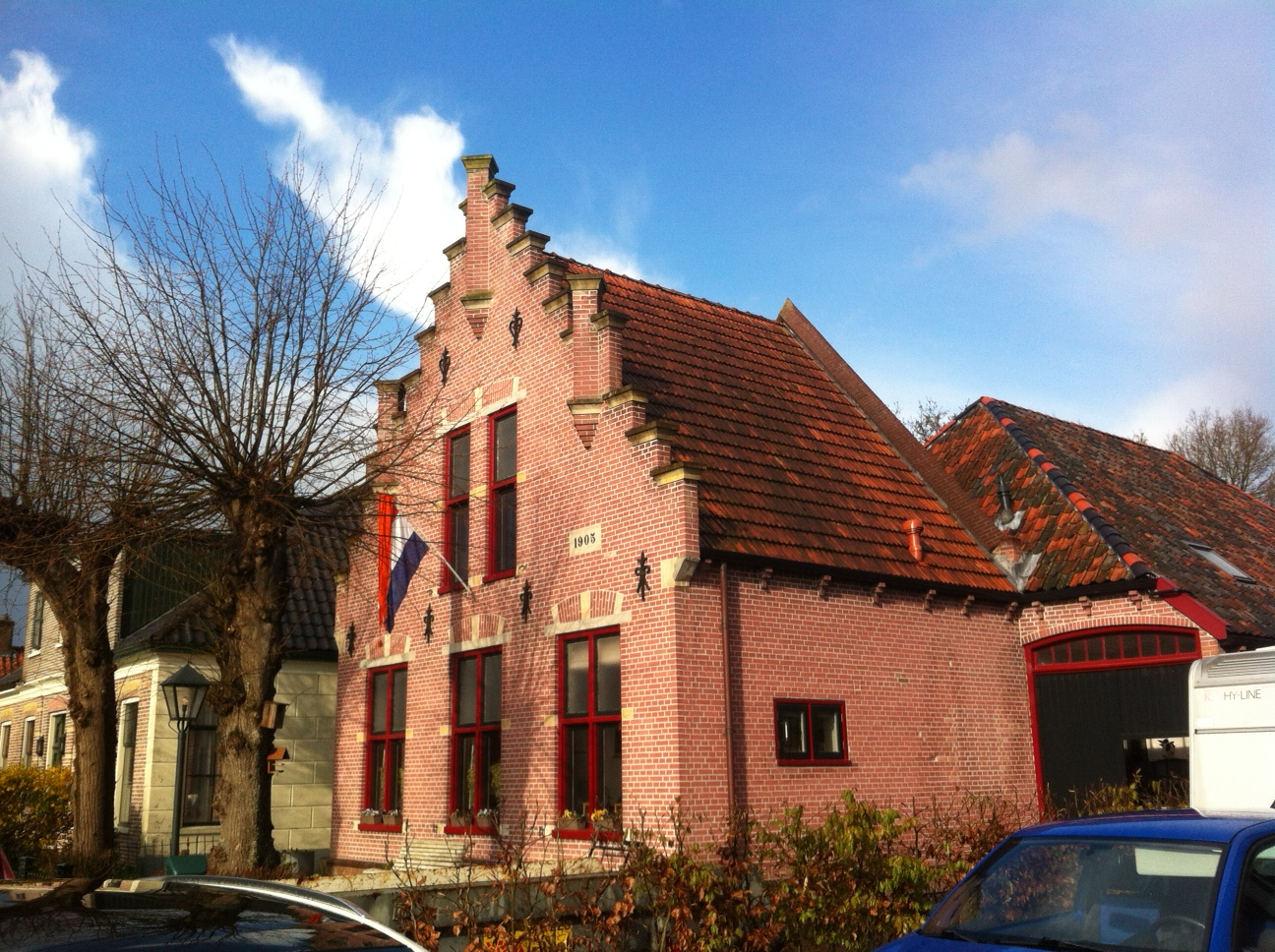
House in Smilde

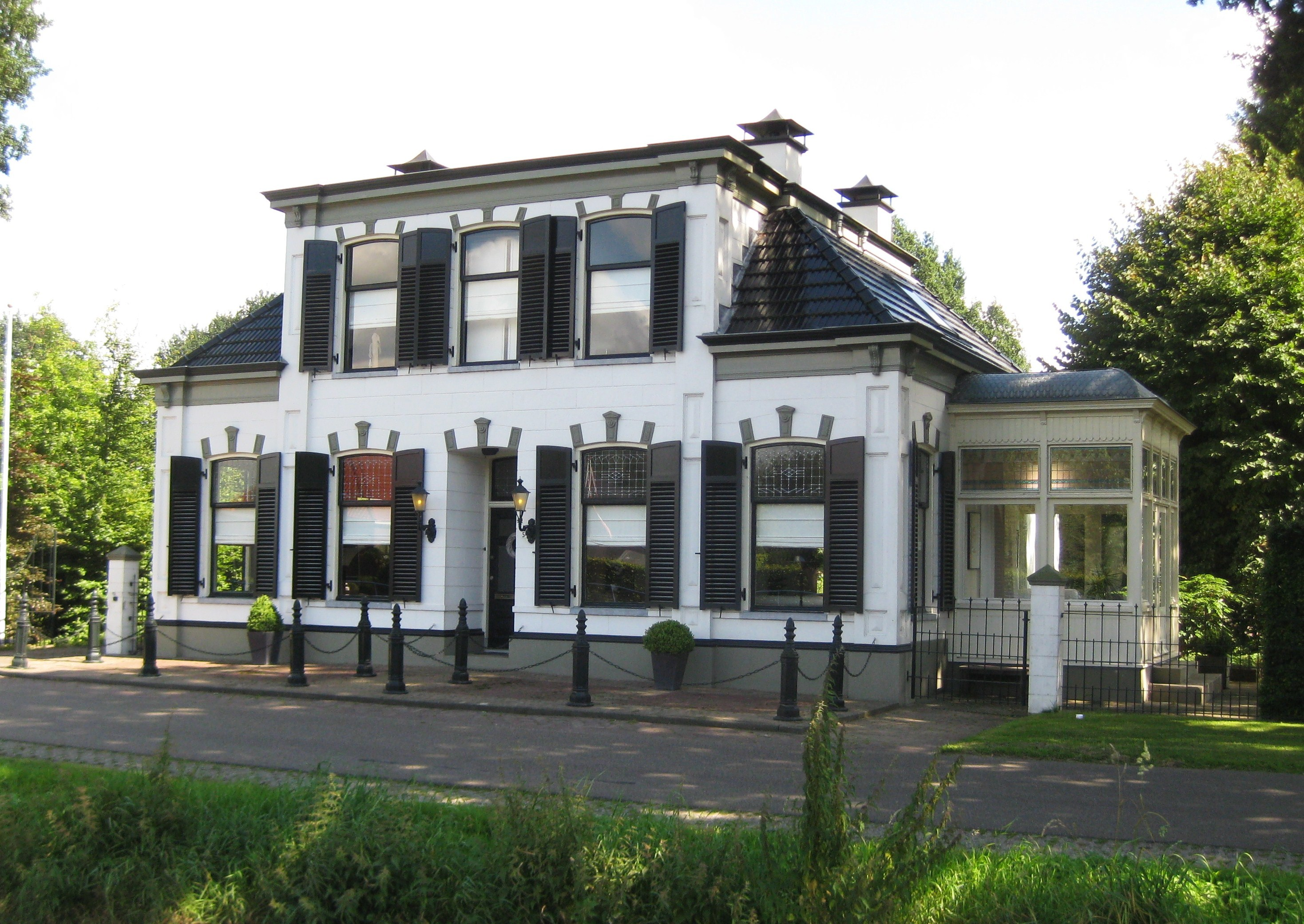
Villa in Smilde

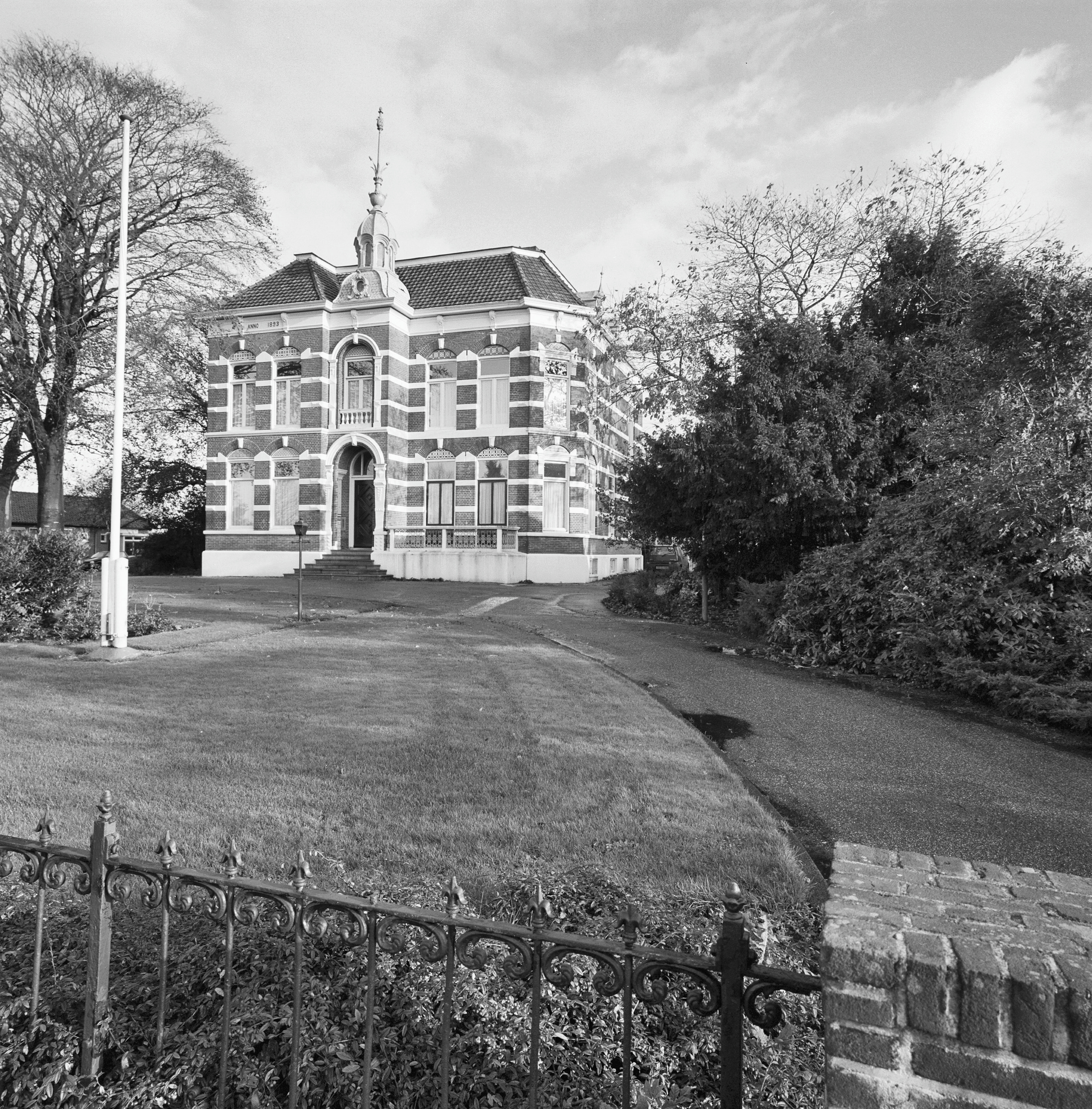
Former town hall
