= Jaap Berghuis =

Dutch artist (1945–2005)

Jakob Albertus Victor (Jaap) Berghuis, (15 August 1945 – 29 July 2005) was a Dutch artist.

Born in the town of Smilde, Drenthe Province, in the Netherlands, Berghuis graduated cum laude in interior design at the Gerrit Rietveld Academy in Amsterdam, followed by a degree in painting at the Ateliers '63 (now De Ateliers) in Amsterdam, Netherlands.

From 1969 to 1989 Berghuis exhibited with the renowned Art & Project Gallery in Amsterdam, with two exhibitions in 1974 and one in 1980. Further exhibitions include:

- the Atelier 11, Stedelijk Museum, Amsterdam (1973);
- Fundamental Painting, Stedelijk Museum, Amsterdam (1975);
- the 9th Biennale de Paris (1975); and
- Neue Malerei aus den Niederlanden, Neue Galerie am Landesmuseum Joaneum, Graz, Germany (1980).
