= Thomas Berghuis =

Dutch curator

Thomas Jakob Berghuis is a curator, art historian, and former museum director based in Leiden, Netherlands.

== Career ==
From 2008 to 2013 Berghuis worked as a lecturer in Asian Art at the University of Sydney. From 2013 to May 2015 he was the Robert H. N. Ho Curator of Chinese Art at the Guggenheim Museum in New York City, after which he Berghuis moved to Jakarta, Indonesia to become the first director of the Museum of Modern and Contemporary Art in Nusantara (Museum MACAN), launched in January 2016.

Berghuis has been a lecturer in art history with the University of Amsterdam; a Board Member of Framer Framed, a platform for contemporary art, visual culture, and critical theory & practice in Amsterdam; and an honorary principal fellow with the School of Culture & Communication at The University of Melbourne, Australia.

Berghuis has curated and co-curated several exhibitions, including Edge of Elsewhere (2010–2012) with the Sydney Festival at 4A Centre for Contemporary Asian Art and Campbelltown Arts Centre, co-curated with Lisa Havilah and Aaron Seeto; Suspended Histories at Museum Van Loon, 2012–2014; Wang Jianwei: Time Temple at the Guggenheim; and Crossing the Tide, the Tuvalu Pavilion for the 56th Venice Biennale.

== Other roles ==
Berghuis is a Member of AICA, Australia; a Member of ICOM-US; and in 2016 Berghuis was nominated as a participant and member of the Global Museum Leaders Colloquium (GMLC), hosted by the director's office at the Metropolitan Museum of Art in New York.

He is an editorial board member of the Journal of Contemporary Chinese Art; and diˈvan | A Journal of Accounts (UNSW Press, Australia). His writings have been published in Third Text; Theory, Culture, and Society; Positions: East Asia Cultures Critique; and the Journal of Visual Art Practice.

== Selected publications ==
- Performance Art in China (2006)
- Suspended Histories (2013)
